= Transformers (film series) =

Science fiction film series

- Logo used for the first three films in the series
- Directed by: Michael Bay (1–5); Travis Knight (6); Steven Caple Jr. (7)
- Based on: Takara Tomy and Hasbro’s Transformers action figures (Note: The original Transformers toy line itself was developed out of two then-existing Japanese mecha toy lines – Diaclone and Microman – by Takara. In 2006, Takara merged with Tomy to form a single company, Takara Tomy.)
- Produced by: Lorenzo di Bonaventura; Tom DeSanto; Don Murphy; Ian Bryce (1–5); Michael Bay (6–7); Mark Vahradian (6–7)
- Distributed by: Paramount Pictures (2007–present)
- Running time: 1002 minutes (7 films)
- Language: English
- Budget: $1.307 billion
- Box office: $5.42 billion

Transformers is a series of science fiction action films based on the Transformers franchise. Michael Bay directed the first five live action films: Transformers (2007), Revenge of the Fallen (2009), Dark of the Moon (2011), Age of Extinction (2014), and The Last Knight (2017), and has served as a producer for subsequent films. A sixth film, Bumblebee, directed by Travis Knight, was released in 2018; a seventh film, Rise of the Beasts, directed by Steven Caple Jr., was released in 2023.

The series has been distributed by Paramount Pictures, with DreamWorks Pictures working on the first two films. While the Transformers film series has received negative to mixed reception, Bumblebee received positive reviews. Despite its critical reception, the Transformers film series has generally been successful at the box office, with Dark of the Moon and Age of Extinction grossing over $1 billion each; the latter was the highest-grossing film of 2014. The film series is 15th-highest-grossing, with $5.42 billion grossed from the seven films to date.

== Films ==
Transformers films
Film	U.S. release date	Directed by	Screenplay by	Story by	Produced by
Transformers	July 3, 2007	Michael Bay	Roberto Orci & Alex Kurtzman	John Rogers, Roberto Orci & Alex Kurtzman	Lorenzo di Bonaventura, Tom DeSanto, Don Murphy & Ian Bryce
Transformers: Revenge of the Fallen	June 24, 2009	Michael Bay	Ehren Kruger, Roberto Orci & Alex Kurtzman	Ehren Kruger, Roberto Orci & Alex Kurtzman	Lorenzo di Bonaventura, Tom DeSanto, Don Murphy & Ian Bryce
Transformers: Dark of the Moon	June 29, 2011	Michael Bay	Ehren Kruger	Ehren Kruger	Lorenzo di Bonaventura, Tom DeSanto, Don Murphy & Ian Bryce
Transformers: Age of Extinction	June 27, 2014	Michael Bay	Ehren Kruger	Ehren Kruger	Lorenzo di Bonaventura, Tom DeSanto, Don Murphy & Ian Bryce
Transformers: The Last Knight	June 21, 2017	Michael Bay	Art Marcum & Matt Holloway, Ken Nolan	Akiva Goldsman, Art Marcum, Matt Holloway & Ken Nolan	Lorenzo di Bonaventura, Tom DeSanto, Don Murphy & Ian Bryce
Bumblebee	December 21, 2018	Travis Knight	Christina Hodson	Christina Hodson	Lorenzo di Bonaventura, Tom DeSanto, Don Murphy, Michael Bay & Mark Vahradian
Transformers: Rise of the Beasts	June 9, 2023	Steven Caple Jr.	Joby Harold, Erich Hoeber, Jon Hoeber, Darnell Metayer & Josh Peters	Joby Harold	Lorenzo di Bonaventura, Tom DeSanto, Don Murphy, Michael Bay, Mark Vahradian & Duncan Henderson

=== Transformers (2007) ===
Producer Don Murphy was planning a G.I. Joe film adaptation, but when the U.S. launched the invasion of Iraq in March 2003, Hasbro suggested adapting the Transformers franchise instead. Tom DeSanto joined Murphy because he was a fan of the series. They met with comic book writer Simon Furman, and cited the Generation 1 cartoon and comics as their main influence. They made the Creation Matrix their plot device, though Murphy had it renamed because of the film series The Matrix. DeSanto chose to write the treatment from a human point of view to engage the audience, while Murphy wanted it to have a realistic tone, reminiscent of a disaster film. The treatment featured the Autobots Optimus Prime, Ironhide, Jazz, Prowl, Arcee, Ratchet, Wheeljack, and Bumblebee, and the Decepticons Megatron, Starscream, Soundwave, Ravage, Laserbeak, Rumble, Skywarp and Shockwave.

Steven Spielberg, a fan of the comics and toys, signed on as executive producer in 2004. John Rogers wrote the first draft, which pitted four Autobots against four Decepticons, and featured the Ark spaceship. Roberto Orci and Alex Kurtzman, fans of the cartoon, were hired to rewrite the script in February 2005. Spielberg suggested that "a boy and his car" should be the focus. This appealed to Orci and Kurtzman because it conveyed themes of adulthood and responsibility, "the things that a car represents in the United States". The characters of Sam and Mikaela were the sole point of view given in Orci and Kurtzman's first draft. The Transformers had no dialogue, as the producers feared talking robots would look ridiculous. The writers felt that even if it would look silly, not having the robots speak would betray the fanbase. The first draft also had a battle scene in the Grand Canyon. Spielberg read each of Orci and Kurtzman's drafts and gave notes for improvement. The writers remained involved throughout production, adding additional dialogue for the robots during the sound mixing (although none of this was kept in the final film, which ran fifteen minutes shorter than the initial edit). Furman's The Ultimate Guide, published by Dorling Kindersley, remained as a resource to the writers throughout production. Prime Directive was used as a fake working title. This was also the name of Dreamwave Productions' first Transformers comic book.

Michael Bay was asked to direct by Spielberg on July 30, 2005, but he dismissed it as a "stupid toy movie". Nonetheless, he wanted to work with Spielberg, and gained a new respect for the mythology upon visiting Hasbro. Bay considered the first draft "too kiddie", so he increased the military's role in the story. The writers sought inspiration from G.I. Joe for the soldier characters, being careful not to mix the brands. Because Orci and Kurtzman were concerned the film could feel like a military recruitment commercial, they chose to make the military believe nations like Iran were behind the Decepticon attack as well as making the Decepticons primarily military vehicles. Bay based Lennox's struggle to get to the Pentagon phone line while struggling with an unhelpful operator from a real account he was given by a soldier when working on another film.

Orci and Kurtzman experimented with numerous robots from the franchise, ultimately selecting the characters most popular among the filmmakers to form the final cast. Bay acknowledged that most of the Decepticons were selected before their names or roles were developed, as Hasbro had to start designing the toys. Optimus, Megatron, Bumblebee and Starscream were the only characters present in each version of the script. Arcee was a female Transformer introduced by Orci and Kurtzman, but she was cut because they found it difficult to explain robotic gender; Bay also disliked her motorcycle form, which he found too small. An early idea to have the Decepticons simultaneously strike multiple places around the world was also dropped, being used later in the film's sequels.

=== Transformers: Revenge of the Fallen (2009) ===
In September 2007, Paramount announced a late June 2009 release date for the sequel to Transformers. A major hurdle that was overcome during production was the 2007–2008 Writers Guild of America strike, as well as possible strikes by the Directors Guild of America and the Screen Actors Guild. Bay began creating animatics of action sequences featuring characters rejected for the 2007 film; this would allow animators to complete sequences if the Directors Guild of America went on strike in July 2008, which ultimately did not happen. The director considered making a small project in between Transformers and its sequel, but knew "you have your baby and you don't want someone else to take it". The film was given a $200 million budget, which was $50 million more than the 2007 film, and some of the action scenes rejected for the original were written into the sequel, such as the way Optimus is reintroduced in this film. Lorenzo di Bonaventura said the studio proposed filming two sequels simultaneously, but he and Bay concurred that was not the right direction for the series.

Writers Roberto Orci and Alex Kurtzman originally passed on the sequel because of a busy schedule. The studio began courting other writers in May 2007, but as they were unimpressed with their pitches, they convinced Orci and Kurtzman to return. The studio also signed on Ehren Kruger, as he impressed Bay and Hasbro president Brian Goldner with his knowledge of the Transformers mythology, and because he was friends with Orci and Kurtzman. The writing trio were paid $8 million. Screenwriting was interrupted by the 2007–2008 Writers Guild of America strike, but to avoid production delays the writers spent two weeks writing a treatment, which they handed in the night before the strike began, and Bay expanded the outline into a sixty-page scriptment, fleshing out the action, adding more jokes, as well as selecting the majority of new characters. The three writers spent four months finishing the screenplay while "locked" in two hotel rooms by Bay: Kruger wrote in his own room and the trio would check on each other's work twice a day.

Orci described the film's theme as "being away from home", with the Autobots contemplating living on Earth as they cannot restore Cybertron, while Sam goes to college. He wanted the focus between the robots and humans "much more evenly balanced", "the stakes [to] be higher", and the science fiction elements more prominent. Lorenzo di Bonaventura said that in total, there are around forty robots in the film, while ILM's Scott Farrar has said there are actually sixty. Orci added that he wanted to "modulate" the humor more, and felt he managed the more "outrageous" jokes by balancing them with a more serious plot approach to the Transformers' mythology. Bay concurred that he wanted to please fans by making the tone darker, and that "moms will think its safe enough to bring the kids back out to the movies" despite his trademark sense of humor.

Before Transformers was released, producer DeSanto had "a very cool idea" to introduce the Dinobots, while Bay was interested in an aircraft carrier, which was dropped from the 2007 film. Orci claimed they did not incorporate these characters into Revenge of the Fallen because they could not think of a way to justify the Dinobots' choice of form, and were unable to fit in the aircraft carrier. Orci also admitted he was also dismissive of the Dinobots because he does not like dinosaurs. "I recognize I am weird in that department", he said, but he became fonder of them during filming because of their popularity with fans. Bay said he hated the Dinobots and they had never been in consideration for being featured in the movies. It is the last film in the series to be distributed by DreamWorks.

=== Transformers: Dark of the Moon (2011) ===
For the third film, as a preemptive measure before the release of Revenge of the Fallen, Michael Lucchi and Paramount announced on March 16, 2009, that a third film would be released in IMAX 3-D on July 1, 2011, which earned a surprised response from director Bay:

I said I was taking off a year from Transformers. Paramount made a mistake in dating Transformers 3—they asked me on the phone—I said yes to July 1—but for 2012—whoops! Not 2011! That would mean I would have to start prep in September. No way. My brain needs a break from fighting robots.

Screenwriters Roberto Orci and Alex Kurtzman, who had worked on the two previous Transformers films, declined to return for the third film, with Kurtzman declaring that "the franchise is so wonderful that it deserves to be fresh, all the time. We just felt like we'd given it a lot and didn't have an insight for where to go with it next". Revenge of the Fallen's co-writer Ehren Kruger became the sole screenwriter for Dark of the Moon. Kruger had frequent meetings with Industrial Light & Magic's (ILM) CGI visual effects producers, who suggested plot points such as the scenes in Chernobyl.

On October 1, 2009, Bay revealed that Dark of the Moon had already gone into pre-production, and its planned release was back to its originally intended date of July 1, 2011, rather than 2012. Due to the revived interest in 3-D technology brought in by the success of Avatar, talks between Paramount, ILM, and Bay had considered the possibility of the next Transformers film being filmed in 3-D, and testing was performed to bring the technology into Bay's work. Bay originally was not much interested in the format as he felt it did not fit his "aggressive style" of filmmaking, but he was convinced after talks with Avatar director James Cameron, who even offered the technical crew from that film. Cameron reportedly told Bay about 3-D, "You gotta look at it as a toy, it's another fun tool to help get emotion and character and create an experience." Bay was reluctant to film with 3-D cameras since in test he found them to be too cumbersome for his filming style, but he did not want to implement the technology in post production either since he was not pleased with the results. In addition to using the 3-D Fusion camera rigs developed by Cameron's team, Bay and the team spent nine months developing a more portable 3-D camera that could be brought into location.

In a hidden extra for the Blu-ray release of Revenge of the Fallen, Bay expressed his intention to make Transformers 3 not necessarily larger than Revenge of the Fallen, but instead deeper into the mythology, to give it more character development, and to make it darker and more emotional. Having been called Transformers 3 up to that point, final title was revealed to be Dark of the Moon in October 2010. After Revenge of the Fallen was panned by critics, Bay acknowledged the general flaws of the script, having blamed the 2007–2008 Writers Guild of America strike prior to the film for many problems. Bay promised to not have the "dorky comedy" from the last film.

=== Transformers: Age of Extinction (2014) ===
In February 2012, producer di Bonaventura stated that a fourth film was in the works, aiming for a 2014 release, with Michael Bay to direct and produce. On the same day, Paramount Pictures and Michael Bay announced a June 27, 2014 release date for a fourth film. Ehren Kruger would pen the script and Steve Jablonsky would score the film, as each had for the previous film. The film is set five years after the events in Transformers: Dark of the Moon. Shia LaBeouf did not return in any future installments. Mark Wahlberg was instead cast in the lead role as new character, Cade Yeager. In November 2012, casting began to search for two more leads. Isabelle Cornish, Nicola Peltz, Gabriella Wilde, and Margaret Qualley were all considered to play Cade's daughter Tessa Yeager, while Luke Grimes, Landon Liboiron, Brenton Thwaites, Jack Reynor, and Hunter Parrish were all considered to play Tessa's race-car-driving boyfriend, Shane Dyson. Bay announced on his website that Reynor would portray Shane and that the fourth film would start the next installment in the overall series; the film was to be a darker sequel to Dark of the Moon and have a different feeling. Peter Cullen, who voiced Optimus Prime in the films, was to reprise his role. With a budget of $165 million, filming was expected to take place in London between April and November 2013—once Pain & Gain, another film that Bay was directing, had finished editing.

On January 8, 2013, it was announced that Reynor was joining Wahlberg in the lead. On March 26, 2013, Nicola Peltz was cast as the female lead. Bay revealed that actor Stanley Tucci had joined the cast, and that the film would be the first feature film to be shot using smaller digital IMAX 3D cameras. On May 1, 2013, actor Kelsey Grammer was cast as the lead human villain named "Harold Attinger". On May 6, 2013, actress Sophia Myles was cast in a major supporting role. That same month, Chinese actress Li Bingbing and comedian T. J. Miller joined the cast.

Actor T.J. Miller would be playing the best friend of Wahlberg's character who is a mechanic. Also revealed were two Autobots who would have the following alternate modes—a black-and-blue 2013 Bugatti Veyron Grand Sport Vitesse named "Drift", and a green 2014 C7 Corvette Stingray concept named Crosshairs. A truck from Western Star Trucks would be Optimus Prime's new alternate mode for the movie. Bumblebee's new alternate mode was revealed to be a modified vintage 1967 Chevrolet Camaro, which later transforms into a 2014 Chevrolet Camaro concept.

Filming began in June 2013, in Detroit, Chicago, Austin, Los Angeles, and Hong Kong. The film was released on June 27, 2014.

=== Transformers: The Last Knight (2017) ===
In March 2015, Deadline Hollywood reported that Paramount Pictures was in talks with Akiva Goldsman to pitch new ideas for the Transformers franchise's future installments. The studio intended to do what James Cameron and 20th Century Fox have been doing in planning three Avatar sequels, and what Disney has done to revive Star Wars, with sequels and spin-offs. Paramount has wanted to have their own cinematic universe for Transformers, similar to the Marvel Cinematic Universe (which had been one of Paramount's previous film franchises), and DC Comics/Warner Bros.' DC Extended Universe. Goldsman is the head of the future projects, and worked with franchise director Michael Bay, executive producer Steven Spielberg, and producer Lorenzo di Bonaventura to organize a "writers' room" that incubates ideas for potential Transformers films. The writers' room members include Christina Hodson, Lindsey Beer, Andrew Barrer, and Gabriel Ferrari (Ant-Man), Robert Kirkman (The Walking Dead), Art Marcum & Matt Holloway, Zak Penn (Pacific Rim Uprising), Jeff Pinkner (The Amazing Spider-Man 2), Ken Nolan, and Geneva Robertson-Dworet. Kirkman left the room after just one day to undergo throat surgery. In July 2015, Akiva Goldsman and Jeff Pinkner were announced as the fifth Transformers film's screenwriters. However, on November 20, due to Goldsman's commitments creating a writers' room for G.I. Joe and Micronauts properties, Paramount began to negotiate with Art Marcum and Matt Holloway (Iron Man), as well as Ken Nolan (Black Hawk Down), to write the film. Lindsey Beer and Geneva Robertson-Dworet were also brought aboard for writing duties.

After Transformers: Age of Extinction, Bay had decided not to direct any future Transformers films. But in early January 2016, in an interview with Rolling Stone, he stated that he would return to direct the fifth film, and that it will be his last Transformers film. Paramount Pictures spent $80 million on production in Michigan, in return for $21 million in state incentives, under agreements entered into before the state legislature eliminated the film office incentive program in July 2015. In April 2016, Paramount hired cinematographer Jonathan Sela. On May 17, Bay revealed the official title as The Last Knight, and posted a production video showing a close-up of Optimus Prime's face with purple eyes instead of blue, and his face mostly discolored. The official Twitter account showed a 19-second short video in morse code that translates to "I'm coming for you May 31". On May 31, it was revealed that Megatron would return in the sequel.

=== Bumblebee (2018) ===
Bumblebee is a spin-off film centered on the Transformers character of the same name and set in the 1980s. The design and style of the film included both elements from the current franchise and influences from the 1980s Transformers: Generation 1 toyline.

Principal photography on the film began in July 2017, in Los Angeles and San Francisco, California. It was released on December 21, 2018, to positive reviews.

=== Transformers: Rise of the Beasts (2023) ===
In March 2019, producer Lorenzo di Bonaventura announced ongoing developments for a follow-up to Bumblebee. By January 2020, it was officially announced that a sequel to Bumblebee was in development with a script written by Joby Harold, alongside an adaptation of Transformers: Beast Wars with a script written by James Vanderbilt. The film was then scheduled for release on June 24, 2022, that May, while in November, Steven Caple Jr. was hired to serve as director on the project, which serves as both a Bumblebee sequel and Beast Wars adaptation. In April 2021, Anthony Ramos was cast in one of the lead roles, with Dominique Fishback in final talks to play the lead role. The project was a joint-venture production between Hasbro, eOne, and Paramount Pictures.

Principal photography began in June 2021, with the official title announced as Transformers: Rise of the Beasts, confirmed to be set after the events of Bumblebee. Rise of the Beasts was originally scheduled for release in June 2022, but was delayed until June 9, 2023.

== Future ==
=== Untitled Transformers: The Last Knight sequel ===
A direct sequel to Transformers: The Last Knight (2017) was originally planned as part of Paramount Pictures' proposed Transformers cinematic universe. The film was scheduled for theatrical release on June 28, 2019. In May 2018, Paramount removed the project from its release schedule following the commercial underperformance of The Last Knight relative to earlier installments.

In June 2025, it was reported that Michael Bay, who directed the first five live-action Transformers films, had approached Paramount Pictures about returning to the franchise. Bay was developing an original concept for another installment, with Jordan VanDina working on a screenplay.

In June 2026, Jason Fuchs was hired to write an untitled Transformers film for Paramount Pictures and Hasbro. The project was reported to continue the story following Transformers: Rise of the Beasts (2023), although plot details were not disclosed. Lorenzo di Bonaventura, Mark Vahradian, Bay, Tom DeSanto, and Don Murphy were named as producers, with Steven Spielberg and Hasbro Entertainment serving as executive producers.

In October 2026, Paramount announced an expanded creative role for Spielberg, who would oversee the development of the eighth live-action film alongside di Bonaventura. Spielberg, who had served as executive producer on the previous live-action installments, was reported to be taking greater involvement in the film's creative direction, with the intention of returning to a tone similar to that of the earlier films. The screenplay by Fuchs was reported to take place in the present day, with further story details remaining undisclosed. Di Bonaventura, Vahradian, Murphy, DeSanto, and Hasbro were identified as producers.

Bay was subsequently reported to be in early negotiations to return as director, marking his first potential directorial involvement in the franchise since Transformers: The Last Knight (2017).

The subsequently announced eighth live-action film, written by Jason Fuchs and overseen by Steven Spielberg, has not been identified in the October 2026 reporting as a direct sequel to The Last Knight.

=== Untitled Ángel Manuel Soto film ===
In March 2021, Paramount Pictures announced the development of a standalone Transformers film, with Ángel Manuel Soto attached to direct and Marco Ramirez hired to write the screenplay. The project was intended to feature a story separate from the previously released live-action films.

In August 2023, Soto revealed that he had proposed a different story after expressing dissatisfaction with an earlier screenplay. According to Soto, the studio responded positively to his proposal and expressed interest in having him write and direct the project. However, development was interrupted by the 2023 Writers Guild of America strike.

=== Untitled Josh Cooley film ===
In June 2025, it was reported that Josh Cooley, who previously directed the animated film Transformers One (2024), had reached an agreement to develop a separate live-action Transformers film for Paramount Pictures. The project was reported to be among several Transformers productions in development at the studio.

=== G.I. Joe crossover plans ===
A separate effort to connect the Transformers franchise with the G.I. Joe film franchise was established through the ending of Transformers: Rise of the Beasts (2023), which introduced the G.I. Joe organization into the film's storyline. In April 2024, Paramount Pictures officially announced plans for a crossover film involving both franchises during its presentation at CinemaCon.

In June 2024, Derek Connolly was hired to write the screenplay for the planned crossover, which was intended to continue the storyline introduced in Rise of the Beasts.

In October 2026, it was reported that Paramount would no longer proceed with the planned crossover film. Instead, the studio began developing a standalone G.I. Joe film with Danny McBride, separating the two franchises' immediate theatrical plans.

== Unrealized projects ==
=== Proposed Rise of the Beasts sequels ===
In February 2022, during the ViacomCBS Investors' Event, Paramount Pictures announced that Transformers: Rise of the Beasts (2023) would serve as the first installment of a new trilogy of live-action Transformers films. The studio did not announce titles, release dates, or production arrangements for the two planned follow-ups.

Following the release of Rise of the Beasts, producer Lorenzo di Bonaventura and director Steven Caple Jr. discussed potential directions for subsequent films, including the introduction of additional Transformer factions and further exploration of the franchise's mythology. Plans also included expanding the connection between the Transformers and G.I. Joe franchises, which had been established in the film's ending.

In June 2026, it was reported that Jason Fuchs had been hired to write a new Transformers film for Paramount Pictures and Hasbro. The project was described as continuing the story following Rise of the Beasts, although further plot details were not disclosed. The relationship between this project and the originally announced trilogy was not specified.

=== Transformers–G.I. Joe crossover ===
Plans for a crossover between the Transformers and G.I. Joe franchises had been discussed by producer Lorenzo di Bonaventura as early as 2013. The concept was subsequently incorporated into Transformers: Rise of the Beasts (2023), which concluded with the revelation that Noah Diaz, portrayed by Anthony Ramos, had been offered a position with the G.I. Joe organization.

In April 2024, Paramount Pictures officially announced the development of a crossover film during its presentation at CinemaCon. The project was intended to bring together characters from both franchises and continue the storyline established in Rise of the Beasts.

In May 2024, Chris Hemsworth entered negotiations to star in the film. The following month, Derek Connolly was hired to write the screenplay, with di Bonaventura, Michael Bay, Mark Vahradian, Tom DeSanto, and Don Murphy attached as producers. Steven Spielberg and Hasbro Entertainment were attached as executive producers.

In October 2026, Variety reported that Paramount would no longer proceed with the planned crossover. Instead, the studio was developing a separate G.I. Joe film in collaboration with Danny McBride, effectively ending the previously announced joint production.

In November 2026, Paramount announced that the standalone G.I. Joe film, directed by McBride and starring Bradley Cooper as Duke, was scheduled for theatrical release on October 20, 2028. The film was being developed independently of the abandoned Transformers crossover.

== Short films ==
Title	U.S. release date	Director(s)	Screenwriter(s)	Story by	Producer(s)
Transformers: Beginnings	October 16, 2007	Craig S. Philips, Harold Hayes Jr. & Michael White Jr.	Chris Ryall & Simon Furman	Chris Ryall	Joshua Foster
Agent Burns: Welcome to Sector 7	April 2, 2019	Travis Knight	Christina Hodson		Don Murphy, Tom DeSanto, Michael Bay, Mark Vahradian & Lorenzo di Bonaventura
Sector 7 Adventures: The Battle at Half Dome	April 2, 2019	Lessa Millet & Jonathan Pezza	Jordan B. Gorfinkel		Tyler Thornberg & Michael Brosnan

=== Transformers: Beginnings (2007) ===
Released separately from the first film on home release in October 2007, on DVD as a Walmart Exclusive; the short is an animated prequel, presented in the form of a motion comic, with narration from the character Bumblebee. Mark Ryan provides the voice-over work for the role, while the short depicts Megatron's arrival on Earth, as well as Archibald Witwicky's discovery 4 million years later. The short skips to 2003 with Bumblebee arriving on Earth, and Sector 7's pursuit of him.

=== Sector 7 Archive (2019) ===
Released on the home video release of Bumblebee, two short films under a "Sector 7 Archive" label were released.

==== Agent Burns: Welcome to Sector 7 (2019) ====
A short released as an in-universe orientation video, of Agent Burns addressing new hires.

==== Sector 7 Adventures: The Battle at Half Dome (2019) ====
A short film, released in the form of a motion comic, takes place two years after the events of Bumblebee which depicts a fight between Bumblebee and Soundwave. When Sector 7 is attacked by Soundwave, Bumblebee arrives to protect them. During the ensuing battle, Soundwave demands that Sector 7 give back what belongs to the Decepticons.

== Web series ==
Series	Season	Episodes	Originally released	
Series	Season	Episodes	First released	Last released
Transformers: Cyber Missions	1	13	January 21, 2010	September 29, 2010
Bumblebee's First Life on Earth	1	3	March 20, 2019	April 11, 2019

=== Transformers: Cyber Missions (2010) ===
A 13-episode long web series released in 2010, set within and using the Transformers design from the continuity of the live-action movies. It was released on Hasbro's website and in 2011 re-released on Transformers' official YouTube channel. The series was made by TG Studios in only three months. It is set between the events of Revenge of the Fallen and Dark of the Moon.

=== Bumblebee's First Life on Earth (2019) ===
Bumblebee's First Life on Earth (バンブルビー 初めての地球生活, Banburubī Hajimete no Chikyū Seikatsu) is a 3-episode long retelling of the first half of the Bumblebee film with no spoilers. The series was released on Paramount Pictures' Japanese Twitter account.

== Crew and production details ==
Film	Composer	Cinematographer	Editor(s)	Production companies	Distributing companies	Runtime
Transformers	Steve Jablonsky	Mitchell Amundsen	Paul Rubell, Glen Scantlebury & Thomas Muldoon	Paramount Pictures, DreamWorks Pictures, Hasbro, Di Bonaventura Pictures	Paramount Pictures	143 minutes
Transformers: Revenge of the Fallen	Steve Jablonsky	Ben Seresin	Roger Barton, Paul Rubell, Joel Negron & Thomas Muldoon	Paramount Pictures, Di Bonaventura Pictures, DreamWorks Pictures, Hasbro	Paramount Pictures	150 minutes
Transformers: Dark of the Moon	Steve Jablonsky	Amir Mokri	Roger Barton, William Goldenberg & Joel Negron	Paramount Pictures, Hasbro Studios, Di Bonaventura Pictures	Paramount Pictures	154 minutes
Transformers: Age of Extinction	Steve Jablonsky	Amir Mokri	Roger Barton, William Goldenberg & Paul Rubell	Paramount Pictures, Hasbro Studios, Di Bonaventura Pictures, China Movie Channel, Jiaflix Enterprises	Paramount Pictures	165 minutes
Transformers: The Last Knight	Steve Jablonsky	Jonathan Sela	Mark Sanger, John Refoua, Debra Neil-Fisher, Roger Barton, Adam Gerstel & Calvin Wimmer	Paramount Pictures, Huahua Media, The Weying Galaxy, The H Collective, Hasbro Studios, Di Bonaventura Pictures	Paramount Pictures	149 minutes
Bumblebee	Dario Marianelli	Enrique Chediak	Paul Rubell	Allspark Pictures, Di Bonaventura Pictures, Bay Films, Tencent Pictures	Paramount Pictures	114 minutes
Transformers: Rise of the Beasts	Jongnic Bontemps	Enrique Chediak	William Goldenberg & Joel Negron	Paramount Pictures, Skydance Media, Hasbro, New Republic Pictures, Di Bonaventura Pictures, Bay Films	Paramount Pictures	127 minutes

== Reception ==
=== Box office performance ===
Film	Release date	Box office revenue			Budget	Ref.
Film	Release date	North America	Other territories	Worldwide	Budget	Ref.
Transformers	July 3, 2007	$319,246,193	$390,463,587	$709,709,780	$150 million	
Transformers: Revenge of the Fallen	June 24, 2009	$402,111,870	$434,191,823	$836,303,693	$200 million	
Transformers: Dark of the Moon	June 29, 2011	$352,390,543	$771,403,536	$1,123,794,079	$195 million	
Transformers: Age of Extinction	June 27, 2014	$245,439,076	$858,614,996	$1,104,054,072	$210 million	
Transformers: The Last Knight	June 21, 2017	$130,168,683	$475,256,474	$605,425,157	$217 million	
Bumblebee	December 21, 2018	$127,195,589	$340,794,056	$467,989,645	$135 million	
Transformers: Rise of the Beasts	June 9, 2023	$157,341,749	$284,314,801	$441,656,550	$200 million	
Total		$1,733,893,703	$3,555,039,273	$5,288,932,976	$1.307 billion	
List indicator^{(A)} indicates the adjusted totals based on current ticket prices (calculated by Box Office Mojo).

=== Critical and public response ===
Film	Critical		Public
Film	Rotten Tomatoes	Metacritic	CinemaScore
Transformers	57% (227 reviews)	61 (35 reviews)	A
Transformers: Revenge of the Fallen	19% (249 reviews)	35 (32 reviews)	B+
Transformers: Dark of the Moon	35% (259 reviews)	42 (37 reviews)	A
Transformers: Age of Extinction	18% (212 reviews)	32 (38 reviews)	A−
Transformers: The Last Knight	16% (254 reviews)	27 (47 reviews)	B+
Bumblebee	91% (252 reviews)	66 (39 reviews)	A−
Transformers: Rise of the Beasts	51% (237 reviews)	42 (51 reviews)	A−

The film series has met with generally negative to mixed reception. With the exception of Bumblebee, common elements of the original film series were held in low esteem by critics, such as the repeated formulaic plots, sophomoric and toilet humor, female character objectification, clichéd and controversial characterizations, racial and cultural stereotypes, overuse of MacGuffins, product placement, long running times, and excessive retroactive continuity changes (or retcons).

The first Transformers film received mixed reviews from critics, with praise for its groundbreaking visual effects, sound design, action sequences, story, performances, with criticism for the Transformer redesigns and product placement. The second film, Revenge of the Fallen, received negative reviews, with criticism of its screenplay and runtime, but praise for its visual effects and sound design. The third film, Dark of the Moon, received mixed reviews, with praise for its visual effects and sound design, but criticism for its screenplay and runtime.

The fourth film, Age of Extinction received negative reviews from critics for its runtime and direction. The fifth film The Last Knight received negative reviews from critics for its direction, thin plot, and overlong runtime.

Bumblebee received positive reviews, with praise for its lighter tone, story, visuals, performances, voice acting, direction, action sequences, and faithfulness to the 1980s Transformers show. Rise of the Beasts received mixed reviews, with critics deeming it inferior to the preceding Bumblebee film.

=== Accolades ===
The franchise has been frequently praised and won awards for its visual effects and sound design. Michael Bay praised the crew and highlighted the importance of sound saying "I have like 2,000 people – through their artistry – making my dreams a film," Bay said. "The artistry of this sound group is just amazing. I love, love sound. It's 45–50% of the movies."

==== Academy Awards ====
Academy Awards	Film						
Academy Awards	Transformers (2007)	Transformers: Revenge of the Fallen (2009)	Transformers: Dark of the Moon (2011)	Transformers: Age of Extinction (2014)	Transformers: The Last Knight (2017)	Bumblebee (2018)	Transformers: Rise of the Beasts (2023)
Sound Editing	Nominated		Nominated				
Sound Mixing	Nominated	Nominated	Nominated				
Visual Effects	Nominated		Nominated				

==== Golden Raspberry Awards ====
Golden Raspberry Awards	Film						
Golden Raspberry Awards	Transformers (2007)	Transformers: Revenge of the Fallen (2009)	Transformers: Dark of the Moon (2011)	Transformers: Age of Extinction (2014)	Transformers: The Last Knight (2017)	Bumblebee (2018)	Transformers: Rise of the Beasts (2023)
Worst Picture		Won	Nominated	Nominated	Nominated (Note: Referred to as Transformers XVII: The Last Knight on the official nomination list.)		
Worst Director		Won	Nominated	Won	Nominated		
Worst Actor					Nominated (Mark Wahlberg)		
Worst Actress		Nominated (Megan Fox)					
Worst Supporting Actor	Nominated (Jon Voight)		Nominated (Patrick Dempsey) (Ken Jeong)	Won (Kelsey Grammer)	Nominated (Josh Duhamel) (Anthony Hopkins)		
Worst Supporting Actress		Nominated (Julie White)	Nominated (Rosie Huntington-Whiteley)	Nominated (Nicola Peltz)	Nominated (Laura Haddock)		
Worst Screen Couple		Nominated (Shia LaBeouf and either Megan Fox or any Transformer)	Nominated (Shia LaBeouf and Rosie Huntington-Whiteley)				
Worst Screen Ensemble			Nominated (The entire cast)				
Worst Screen Combo				Nominated (Any two robots, actors or robotic actors)	Nominated (Any combination of two humans, two robots or two explosions)		
Worst Prequel, Remake, Rip-off or Sequel		Nominated		Nominated	Nominated		
Worst Screenplay		Won	Nominated	Nominated	Nominated		
The Razzie Nominee So Rotten You Loved It					Nominated		
Razzie Redeemer Award						Nominated	

==== Visual Effects Society Awards ====
Visual Effects Society Awards	Film						
Visual Effects Society Awards	Transformers (2007)	Transformers: Revenge of the Fallen (2009)	Transformers: Dark of the Moon (2011)	Transformers: Age of Extinction (2014)	Transformers: The Last Knight (2017)	Bumblebee (2018)	Transformers: Rise of the Beasts (2023)
Outstanding Visual Effects in a Visual Effects-Driven Feature Motion Picture	Won	Nominated	Nominated				
Best Single Visual Effect of the Year	Won (Desert Highway Sequence)						
Outstanding Performance by an Animated Character in a Live Action Motion Picture	Nominated (Optimus Prime)						
Outstanding Models in a Feature Motion Picture	Won		Won (Driller)	Nominated (Knightship)			
Outstanding Created Environment in a Live Action Feature Motion Picture			Won (155 Wacker Drive)				
Outstanding Compositing in a Feature Motion Picture	Won		Nominated				
Outstanding Virtual Cinematography in a Live Action Feature Motion Picture			Nominated				

=== Home media ===
The franchise has been successful in domestic home video sales and has grossed $922 million as of 2026.

== Other media ==
In addition to the films, the film series has a promotional expanded series that is set both before and after the events of the films. This includes comic books, video games, and novels. While the novels are partially based on the films themselves, and the video games are not in the same continuity as the films, the comic books and graphic novels are in the same continuity and fill in several parts of the stories from the films. Also, Transformers: The Ride – 3D is an amusement ride based on the film series. The ride introduced a new character, Autobot Evac, voiced by Dustin James Leighton.

== See also ==
- The Transformers: The Movie (1986)
- Transformers One (2024)
