= Jason Drucker =

American actor (born 2005)

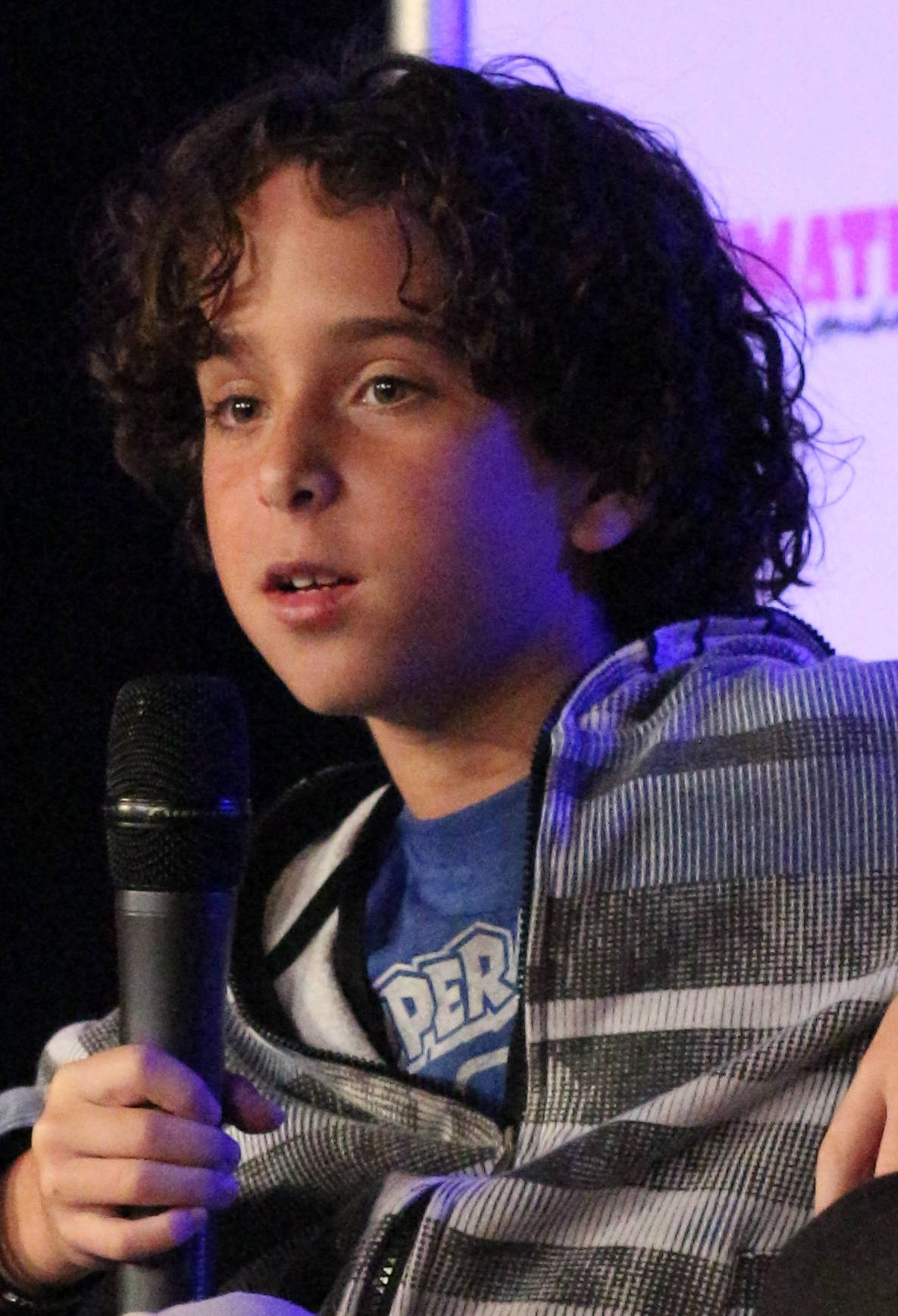
- Drucker in 2015
- Born: September 20, 2005 (age 21); Hollywood, Florida, U.S.
- Occupation: Actor
- Years active: 2014–present
- Height: 5'8

Jason Ian Drucker (born September 20, 2005) is an American actor. He starred as Greg Heffley in the 2017 film Diary of a Wimpy Kid: The Long Haul. He also played Tommy Miller, the youngest of the Miller family, in Nickelodeon's Every Witch Way. In 2018, he co-starred in the Transformers spin-off Bumblebee.

== Biography ==
Drucker was born in Hollywood, Florida. He is of Jewish descent.

Drucker first rose to prominence with his role in Nickelodeon's Every Witch Way, where he played the role of Tommy Miller. Drucker's film debut Barely Lethal, appearing with Hailee Steinfeld, came out in 2015. Drucker was also in 2017's Diary of a Wimpy Kid: The Long Haul, where he played the protagonist, Greg Heffley. He also had a co-starring role in 2018's Bumblebee, again working with Steinfeld. As of 2024, that remains as Drucker's last acting role.

== Filmography ==
=== Film ===
Year	Title	Role	Notes
2015	Barely Lethal	Parker Larson	
2016	WySCAN	Adam	Short film
2016	Benny	Benny	Short film
2016	Nightmarish	Thomas	Short film
2017	Diary of a Wimpy Kid: The Long Haul	Greg Heffley	
2018	Bumblebee	Otis Watson	

=== Television ===
Year	Title	Role	Notes
2014–2015	Every Witch Way	Tommy Miller	51 episodes
2017	Chicago Fire	Hogan Korpi	1 episode
2017	Paradise Run	Himself	1 episode

=== Theatre ===
Year	Title	Role	Notes
2020	Bring it On	Steven	High School Production
2021	12 Incompetent Jurors	Juror #8	High School Production
2022	Mamma Mia	Bill Anderson	High School Production

== Awards and nominations ==
Year	Award	Won	Category	Result	Ref.
2018	Young Entertainer Awards	Diary of a Wimpy Kid: The Long Haul	Best Leading Young Actor - Feature Film	Won	
