= Jorge Lendeborg Jr. =

American actor

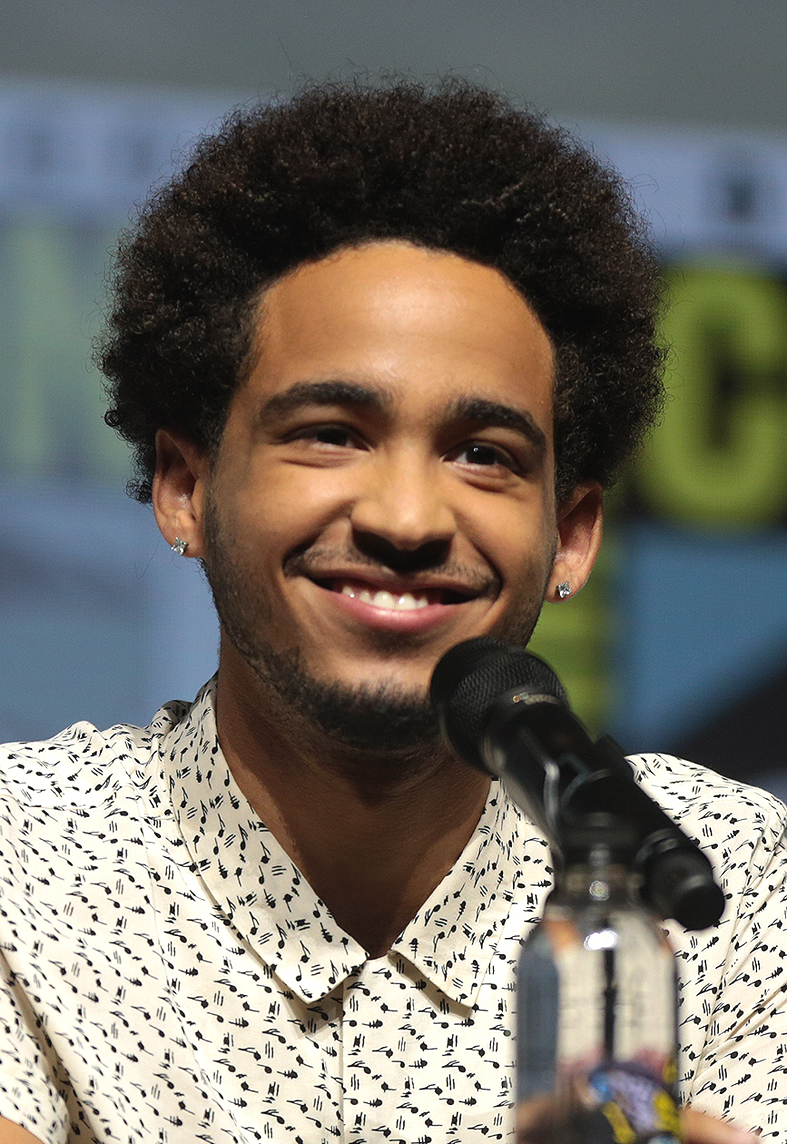
- Lendeborg at the 2018 San Diego Comic-Con
- Born: Jorge Daniel Lendeborg Jr. January 21, 1996 (age 30); Santo Domingo, Dominican Republic
- Occupation: Actor
- Years active: 2014–present

Jorge Daniel Lendeborg Jr. (born January 21, 1996) is an American actor. He is best known for his role as Jason Ionello in the Marvel Cinematic Universe, appearing in Spider-Man: Homecoming (2017) and Spider-Man: Far From Home (2019). He has also had roles in films Love, Simon and Bumblebee (both 2018).

== Early life ==
Lendeborg was born in Santo Domingo in the Dominican Republic, and moved to Miami, Florida at around age four.

== Career ==
Lendeborg made his theatrical acting debut in the 2016 film, The Land. Since then, he has appeared in the Marvel Cinematic Universe superhero films Spider-Man: Homecoming (2017) and Spider-Man: Far From Home (2019), the romantic comedy Love, Simon (2018), and the Transformers spin off Bumblebee (2018), in which he starred as Memo opposite Hailee Steinfeld. Lendeborg also appeared in the James Cameron-produced Robert Rodriguez movie Alita: Battle Angel. He featured as a recurring character, Jah Son, in Hulu's Wu-Tang: An American Saga (2019).

In February 2026, Lendeborg was cast to replace Danny Ramirez as Manny in the third season of the HBO series The Last of Us.

== Filmography ==
=== Film ===
Year	Title	Role	Notes
2016	The Land	Cisco	
2017	Brigsby Bear	Spencer	
2017	Spider-Man: Homecoming	Jason Ionello	
2017	Shot	Miguel	
2018	Love, Simon	Nick Eisner	
2018	Bumblebee	Guillermo "Memo" Gutierrez	
2019	Alita: Battle Angel	Tanji	
2019	Spider-Man: Far From Home	Jason Ionello	
2020	Critical Thinking	Ito Paniagua	
2021	Bliss	Arthur Wittle	
2021	Boogie	Richie	
2021	Night Teeth	Benny Perez	
2022	American Carnage	J.P.	
2022	Spider-Man: No Way Home	Jason Ionello	Extended cut of 2021 film
TBA	Halloween Store	Julio Medina	Post-production

=== Television ===
Year	Title	Role	Notes
2014	Graceland	"Chihuaha"	Episode: "Magic Number"
2019	Wu-Tang: An American Saga	Jah Son	Recurring role (season 1)
2027	The Last of Us	Manny	Season 3

== See also ==
- List of Afro-Latinos
