= Transformers: Rise of the Beasts =

2023 film by Steven Caple Jr.

- Theatrical release poster
- Directed by: Steven Caple Jr.
- Screenplay by: Joby Harold; Erich Hoeber; Jon Hoeber; Darnell Metayer; Josh Peters
- Story by: Joby Harold
- Based on: Hasbro's Transformers action figures
- Produced by: Lorenzo di Bonaventura; Tom DeSanto; Don Murphy; Michael Bay; Mark Vahradian; Duncan Henderson
- Starring: Anthony Ramos; Dominique Fishback
- Cinematography: Enrique Chediak
- Edited by: William Goldenberg; Joel Negron
- Music by: Jongnic Bontemps
- Production companies: Skydance Media; Hasbro; Bayhem Films; New Republic Pictures; di Bonaventura Pictures
- Distributed by: Paramount Pictures
- Release dates: May 27, 2023 (Marina Bay Sands); June 9, 2023 (United States)
- Running time: 127 minutes
- Country: United States
- Language: English
- Budget: $195–200 million
- Box office: $442 million

Transformers: Rise of the Beasts is a 2023 American science fiction action film based on Hasbro's Transformers toy line, and primarily influenced by its Beast Wars sub-franchise. It is the seventh installment in the Transformers film series, and a sequel to Bumblebee (2018). The film was directed by Steven Caple Jr. and written by Joby Harold, Darnell Metayer, Josh Peters, Erich Hoeber, and Jon Hoeber, and stars Anthony Ramos and Dominique Fishback, alongside the voices of Ron Perlman, Peter Dinklage, Michelle Yeoh, Pete Davidson, Liza Koshy, Michaela Jaé Rodriguez, Colman Domingo, Cristo Fernández, Tongayi Chirisa, and returning franchise regulars Peter Cullen, John DiMaggio, and David Sobolov. Set in 1994, the film follows ex-military electronics expert Noah Diaz and artifact researcher Elena Wallace as they help the Autobots and the Maximals protect an artifact known as the Transwarp Key from the villainous Terrorcons.

A sequel was being fast-tracked by the studio after the critical and commercial success of Bumblebee after being announced in January 2019. Two additional films were in development the following year with one of them being based on the Beast Wars series in 2020. Caple Jr. was hired as director that November later that year. The film was officially announced months later in 2021 during a virtual presentation as both a Bumblebee sequel and a Beast Wars film in one. Principal photography took place from June to October 2021, with filming locations including Los Angeles, Peru, Montreal, and New York City.

Transformers: Rise of the Beasts premiered at Marina Bay Sands in Singapore on May 27, 2023, and was theatrically released in the United States on June 9, 2023, by Paramount Pictures. The film received mixed reviews from critics with many deeming it as inferior to the preceding Bumblebee film. It grossed a total of $442 million worldwide against a budget of $195–200 million, becoming a box-office disappointment. As of 2026, another installment is in development.

== Plot ==
The planet-eating Transformer, Unicron, attacks the homeworld of the Maximals. Unicron sends one of his Terrorcon heralds, Scourge, to obtain the Transwarp Key, which can open portals through time and space, allowing Unicron to consume planets faster. The Maximal leader Apelinq sacrifices himself to allow the other Maximals to escape the planet before Unicron devours it. The Maximals' new leader, Optimus Primal, escapes to Earth with the key.

In 1994 Brooklyn, Noah Diaz, an ex-military electronics expert, struggles to find a job to support his ill brother Kris and is convinced by his friend Reek to steal a Porsche to sell, only to discover that it is the Autobot Mirage in disguise. Concurrently, museum intern Elena Wallace studies an ancient statue of a falcon bearing the Maximal symbol and accidentally breaks it open to reveal the key hidden inside. The key releases an energy pulse detected by Autobot leader Optimus Prime, who summons the other Autobots, including Arcee and Bumblebee. Mirage is contacted in the middle of Noah's attempted theft, and he is roped into the Autobots' mission to recover the key so they can use it to return to their homeworld, Cybertron.

Drawn by the key's signature, the Terrorcons arrive on Earth and attack the Autobots outside the museum, with Elena caught up in the conflict. Scourge kills Bumblebee, steals the key, and the Terrorcons retreat when the Maximal Airazor arrives to repel them. Airazor reveals that the Maximals have been hiding on Earth, and Scourge only has half of the Transwarp Key, which was split in two to keep it safe. Prime insists that the key be reassembled so the Autobots can use it to return home, while Noah secretly plots to destroy the key to keep Earth safe.

Elena deduces that the other half of the key is in a hidden temple in Peru. The cargo plane Autobot Stratosphere takes them to Peru, where they meet with Wheeljack, who leads them to the temple. However, the other half of the key is revealed to be no longer there. The Terrorcons attack again, and Scourge corrupts Airazor with Dark Energon. Subsequently, the Autobots meet Primal and the Maximals, who entrusted the second half of the key to a human tribe they have worked with for millennia. Scourge's corruption overtakes Airazor, whom Primal reluctantly kills at her request to save Elena. In the chaos, Noah attempts to destroy the second half of the key, but Prime convinces him otherwise. Scourge steals it and then reassembles the two halves, erecting a tower and opening a portal above Earth for Unicron to enter.

Prime and Noah agree to work together to protect their homeworlds from Unicron. While the Autobots and Maximals battle the Terrorcon army, Noah and Elena sneak in close to the Key, planning to deactivate it with an access code Elena has uncovered. During the battle, Mirage is wounded by Scourge while protecting Noah but transforms his damaged body into a powered exo-suit for Noah so they can fight together. Bumblebee is reactivated when the key activates the Energon-infused valley, and helps the Autobots and Maximals turn the tide of the battle. Prime kills Scourge, but not before the latter damages the control console to prevent the portal from being shut down. Prime destroys the key and collapses the portal, willing to sacrifice himself, but Noah and Primal save him from being sucked into the imploding vortex, which destroys the remaining Terrorcon army and leaves Unicron stranded.

In the aftermath, the Autobots, unable to return to Cybertron, proclaim Earth as their new home and vow to continue protecting it alongside the Maximals. Elena receives recognition for discovering the temple in Peru while Noah attends an interview for a security job but finds he is actually being invited to join the secret military organization G.I. Joe, who will cover Kris's healthcare. Some time later, Noah repairs Mirage using junk Porsche parts from Reek, who claims it is not road-worthy; Noah disproves him by calling Mirage to transform in front of Reek.

== Cast ==
=== Humans ===
- Anthony Ramos as Noah Diaz, an ex-military electronics expert who lives with his family in Brooklyn, trying to support them.
- Dominique Fishback as Elena Wallace, an artifact researcher and intern at a museum.
- Tobe Nwigwe as Reek, Noah's friend who talks him into grand theft auto. The character was based on a mutual best friend of Caple's, who died before filming in 2021.
- Dean Scott Vazquez as Kris Diaz, Noah's younger brother who has sickle cell disease.
- Luna Lauren Vélez as Breanna Diaz, Noah's and Kris' mother.
- Sarah Stiles as Jillian Robinson: Elena's boss at the museum who keeps taking credit for her work.
- Leni Parker as Ms. Greene, a hospital administrator who questions Noah about the payment for Kris' appointment.
- Aidan Devine as Bishop, a security chief who cancels a job interview with Noah due to having talked with Noah's former commanding officer.
- Lucas Huarancca as Amaru, the descendant of a tribe that helped the Maximals for hundreds of years.
- Michael Kelly as Agent Burke: an undercover recruiter for G.I. Joe.
- Lesley Stahl as herself; she appears on 60 Minutes interviewing Elena about the underground ruins she discovered.

=== Transformers ===
- Peter Cullen as Optimus Prime, the leader of the Autobot resistance who transforms into a red 1987 Freightliner FLA semi truck. Caple stated that Optimus Prime's unmasked face in the film was designed after Cullen himself.
- Ron Perlman as Optimus Primal, the leader of the Maximals who transforms into an eastern lowland gorilla. The character's beast mode in the film was based on unused concept art that was illustrated for an inclusion in the 2017 film, Transformers: The Last Knight.
- Peter Dinklage as Scourge, the leader of the Terrorcons and a trophy hunter who transforms into a black Peterbilt 359 logging semi truck.
- Michelle Yeoh as Airazor: A Maximal warrior who transforms into a peregrine falcon.
- Pete Davidson as Mirage, an Autobot spy who can project holograms and transforms into a silver-blue Porsche 964 Carrera RS 3.8, and briefly, into a Formula One car, a Lamborghini Countach, a garbage truck, and an exo-suit. Davidson described voicing Mirage as "Jim Carrey's The Mask meets Bugs Bunny", due to his rebellious personality.
- Liza Koshy as Arcee, an Autobot sharpshooter who transforms into a red-white Ducati 916 motorcycle.
- John DiMaggio as Stratosphere, an Autobot Air-Soldier who transforms into a Fairchild C-119 Flying Boxcar cargo plane, that provides transportation for the Autobots in their global adventure.
- David Sobolov as:
  - Battletrap, a Terrorcon enforcer who transforms into an orange 1980s GMC TopKick C7000 tow truck.
  - Apelinq, the previous Maximal leader who transforms into an albino mountain gorilla and sports retractable blades on his arms.
- Michaela Jaé Rodriguez as Nightbird: A Terrorcon ninja who transforms into a Nissan Skyline GT-R R33.
- Cristo Fernández as Wheeljack, an Autobot scientist and mechanic who transforms into a brown and white 1970s Volkswagen Type 2 panel bus, while speaking in a Mexican accent.
- Tongayi Chirisa as Cheetor, a Maximal scout who transforms into a Southeast African cheetah.
- Colman Domingo as Unicron, a world-devouring planet-sized Transformer who serves as the Terrorcons' master. This marks the character's first proper live-action depiction after previously being teased in The Last Knight.

=== Non-speaking characters ===
- Bumblebee, an Autobot scout who transforms into a modified yellow-black 1970s Chevrolet Camaro, later equipped with all-terrain extensions. Due to having lost his voice box by Blitzwing in Bumblebee, he can only communicate through beeps and pre-recorded film quotes.
- Rhinox, a Maximal commando who transforms into a south-central black rhinoceros. While Sobolov was credited as the character, Rhinox did not speak in the final product.
- The Sweeps, an army of spider-like Terrorcons. Scourge has two built into his body, identified in promotional material as Freezer and Novakane.
- The Scorponoks, an army of robotic scorpions, identified as the Predacons in promotional material.

== Production ==
=== Development ===
In December 2018, when asked about the future of the Transformers franchise, producer Lorenzo di Bonaventura stated that another big Transformers film "would be produced" and that it would be "different than the ones that we've done before." He described the process as more of an "evolution," saying that there is more freedom to create and what they can do with it. After the success of Bumblebee that year, he said that the series would make some changes in tone and style, inspired by the film. Bumblebee director Travis Knight said his goal was to return to his animation studio, Laika, though he acknowledged that he has a few ideas for a sequel. John Cena expressed interest in reprising his role in a sequel. Writer Christina Hodson said that "[she] knows where [she wants] to go with the next one". In late January 2019, a sequel was announced. In March, di Bonaventura confirmed they were developing a script for a Bumblebee sequel.

In January 2020, Paramount Pictures was reportedly working on two different Transformers films, one written by James Vanderbilt and another written by Joby Harold. In November, Steven Caple Jr. was hired to direct Harold's script. In February 2021, it was revealed that the film was going under the working title Transformers: Beast Alliance, hinting the introduction of characters from the Beast Wars franchise. During a virtual event held by Paramount in June, di Bonaventura and Caple revealed the official title as Transformers: Rise of the Beasts (revealing to be both a Bumblebee sequel and Beast Wars film in one), and confirming that it would feature the Maximals, the Predacons, and a new take on the Terrorcons faction. The film's tone and action were heavily influenced by Terminator 2: Judgment Day (1991). Despite the announcement of the Predacons, no such member appeared in the finished film.

In an April 2023 interview, Di Bonaventura stated that the film's story will have a character arc for Optimus Prime prior to the 2007 film, akin to Bumblebee in his self-titled film. In May, Caple said that the events of the 2007 film will be preserved, but also that the story would be standalone and that "Ultimately, all you need to know is that they're trying to get back to Cybertron." Michael Bay again serves as producer, along with the same producers as the previous film. Duncan Henderson joined as producer, in what would be his final film before his death from pancreatic cancer.

=== Casting ===
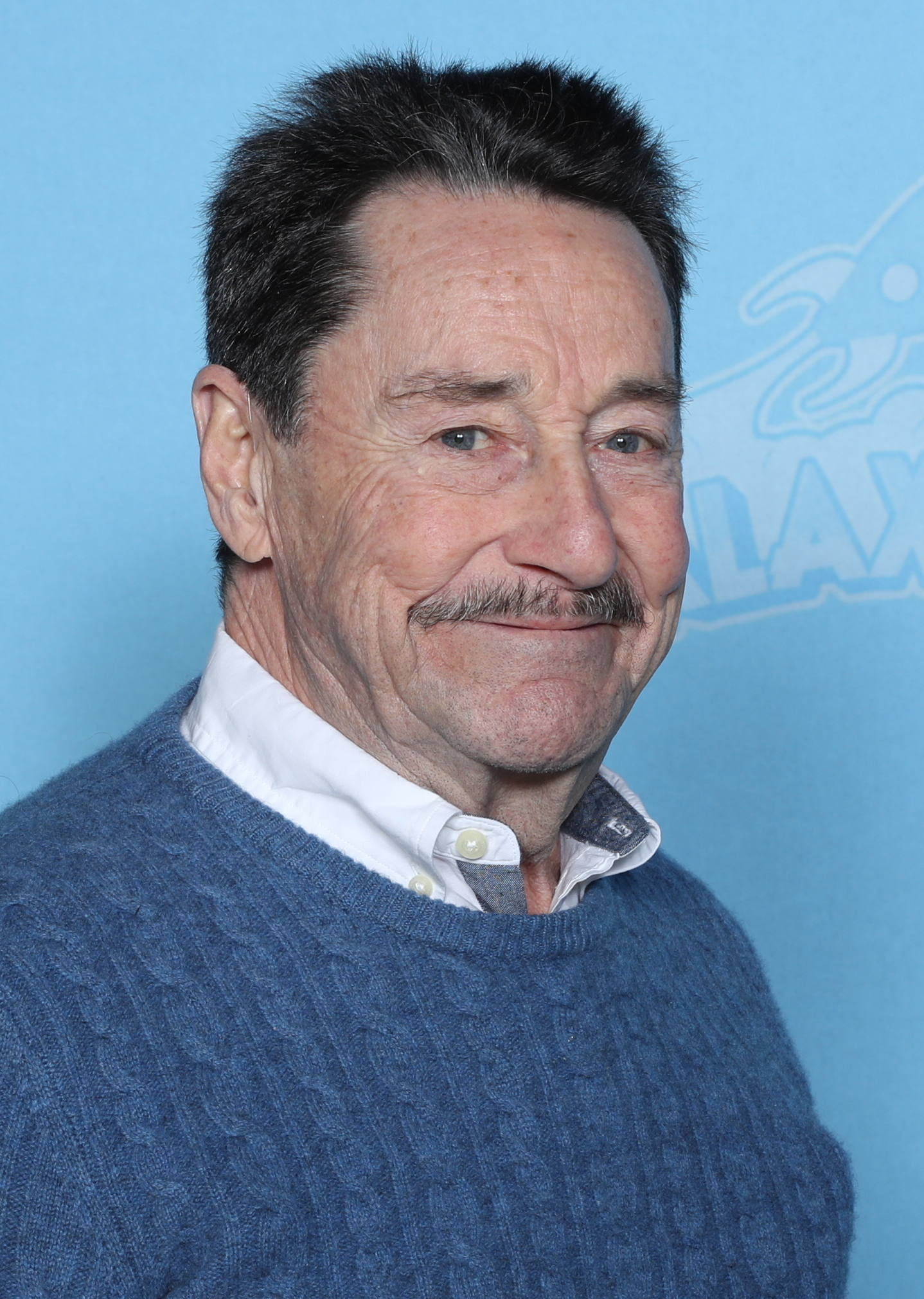
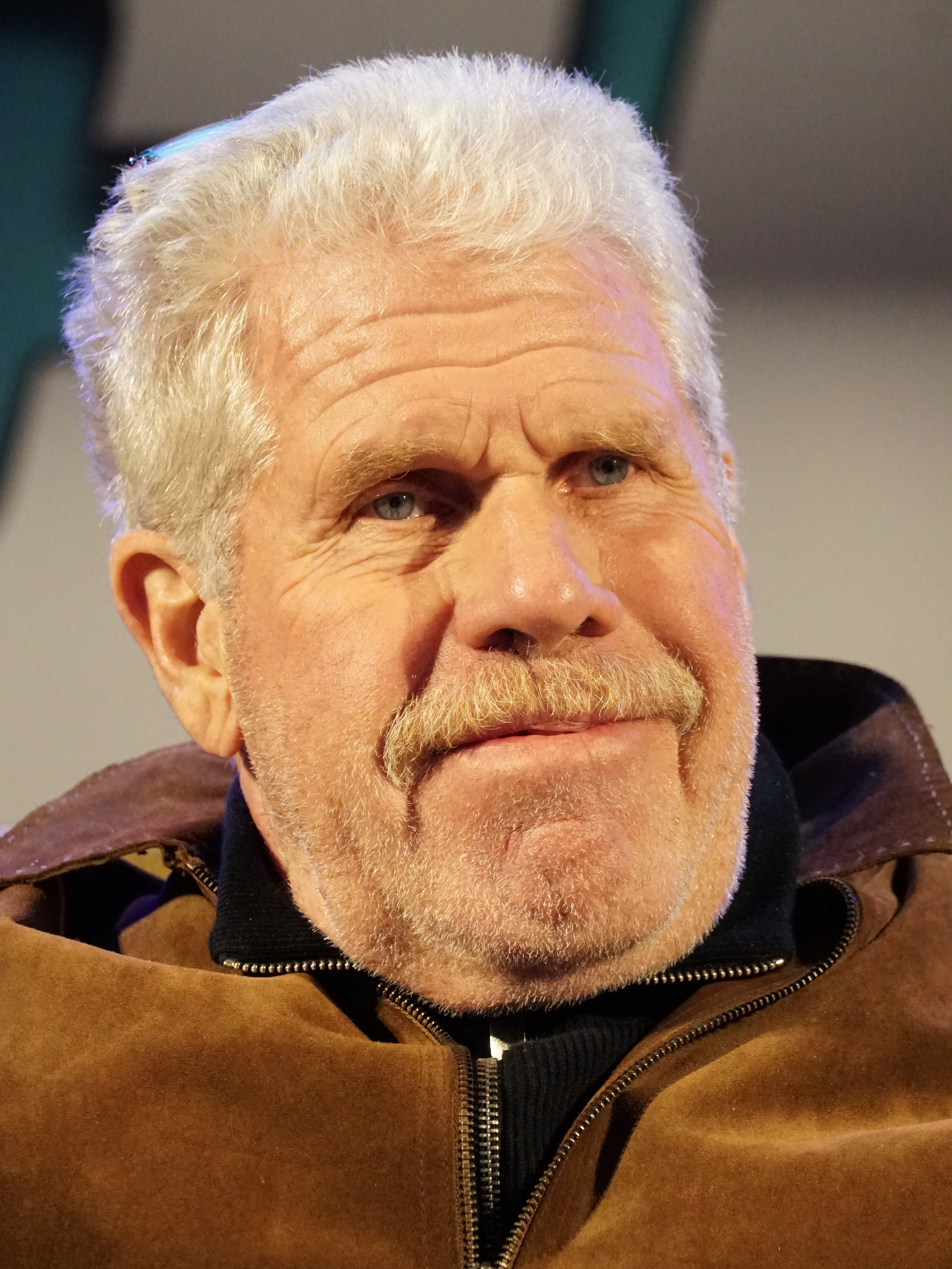
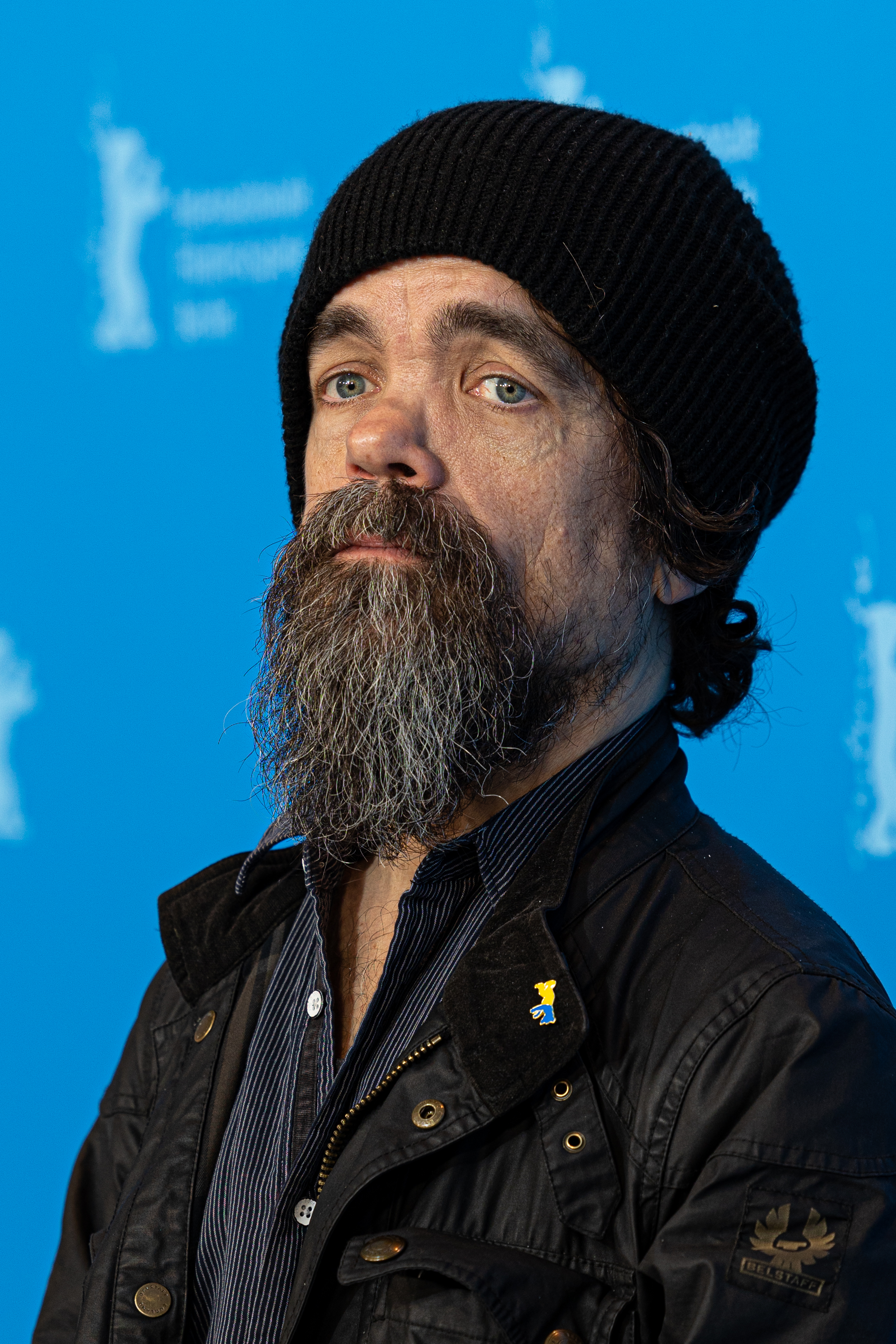
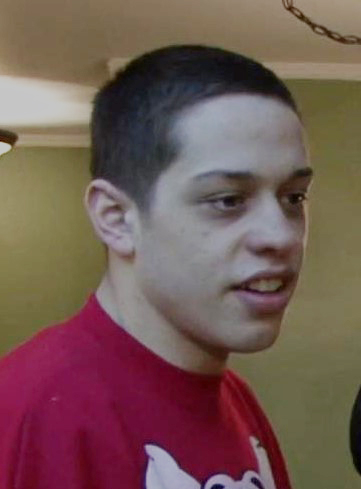
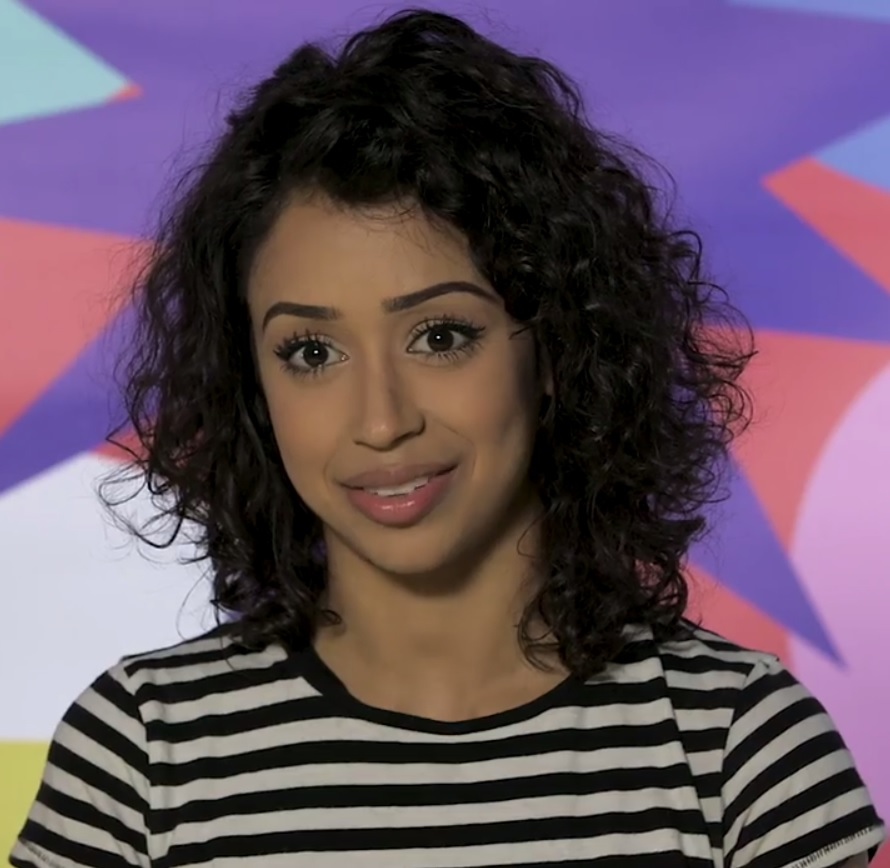
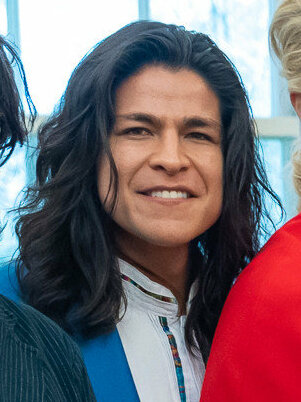
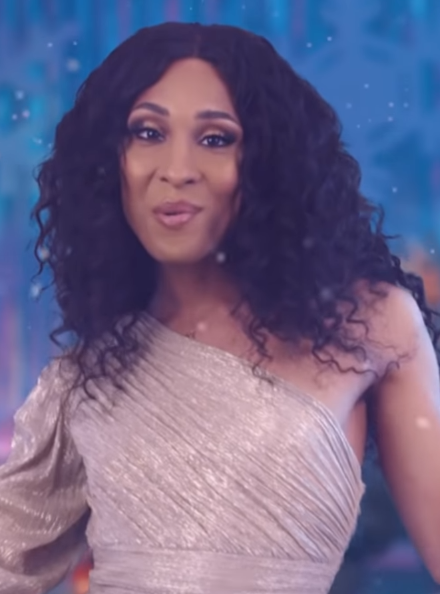
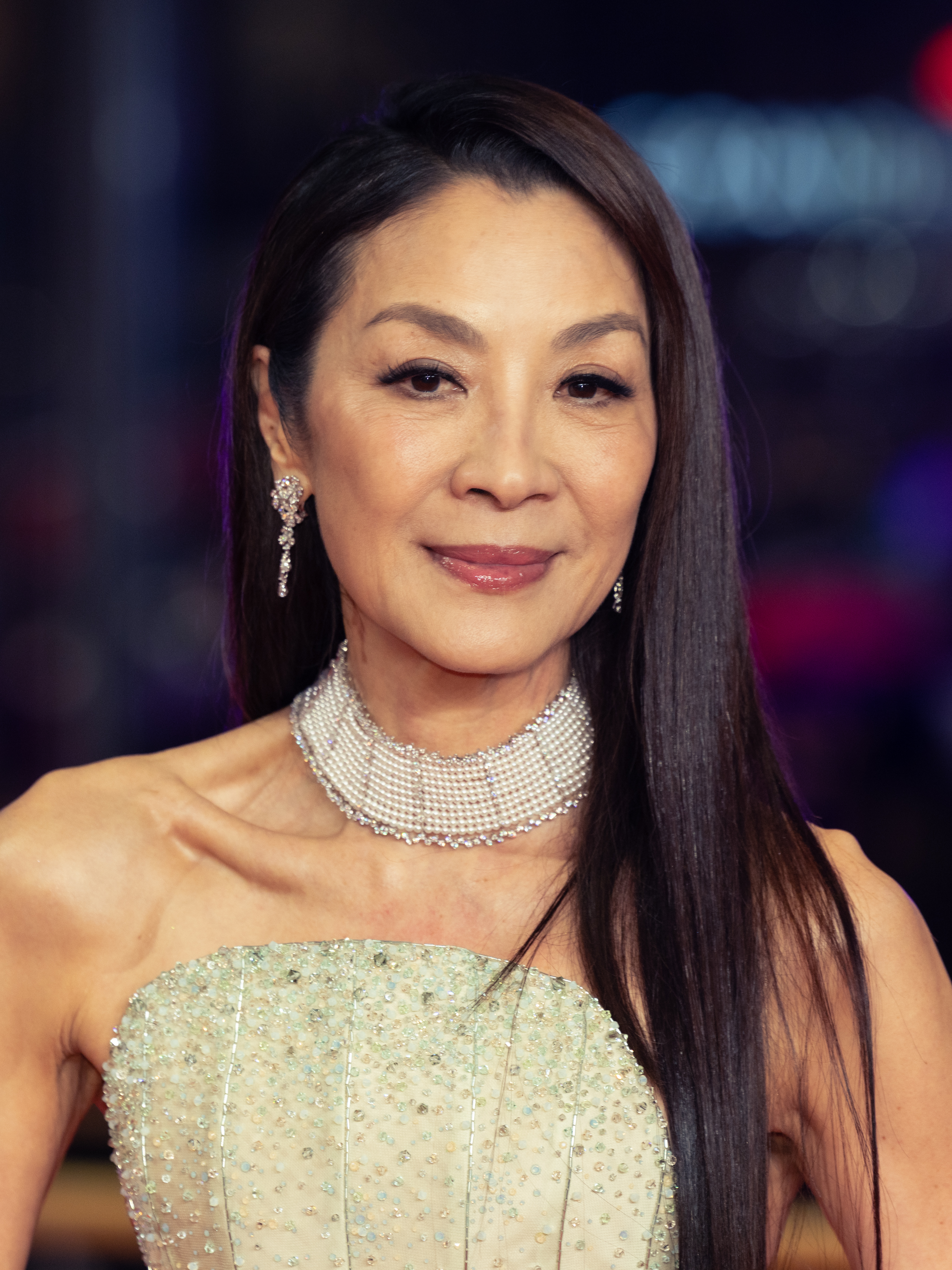
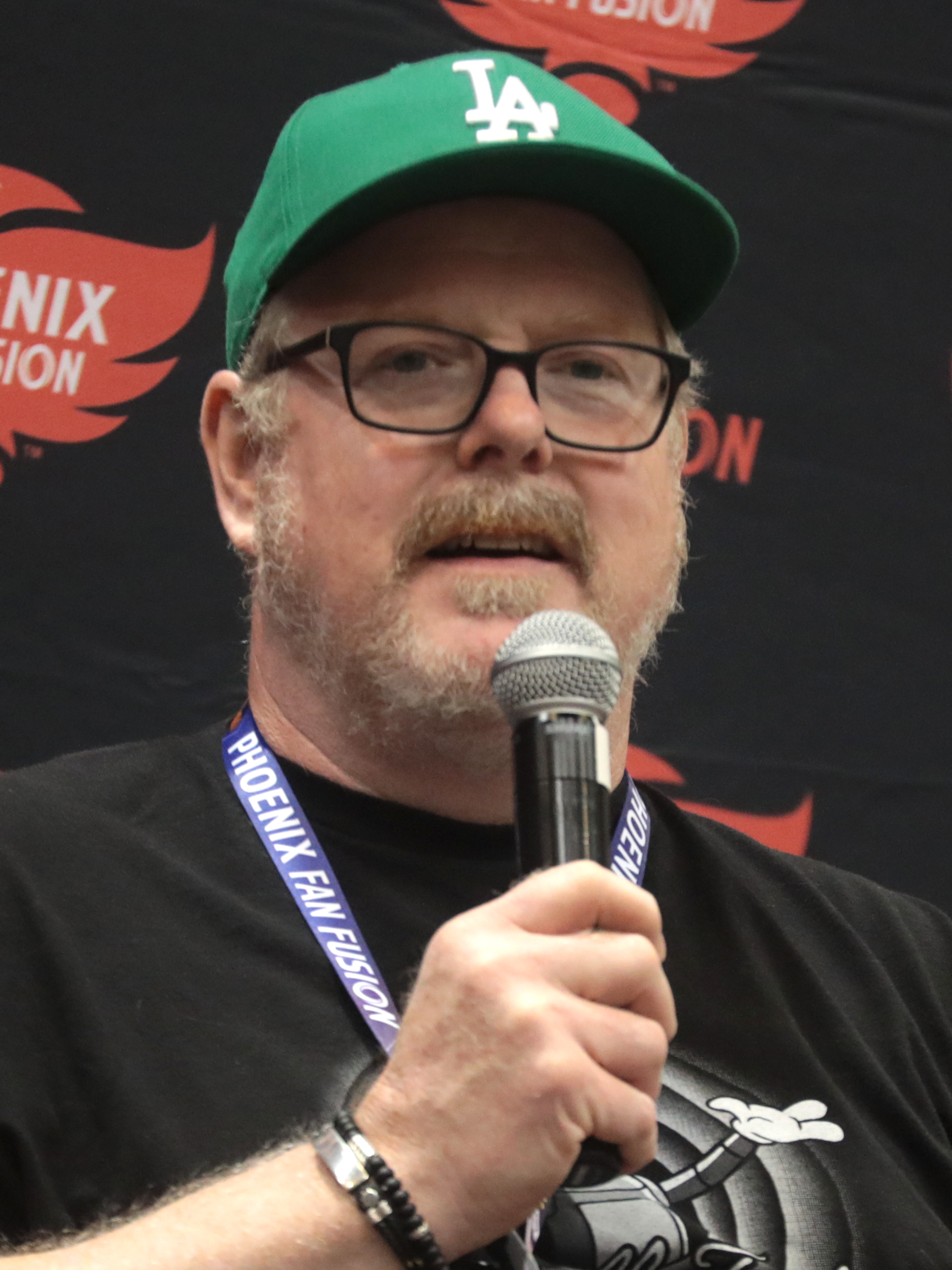
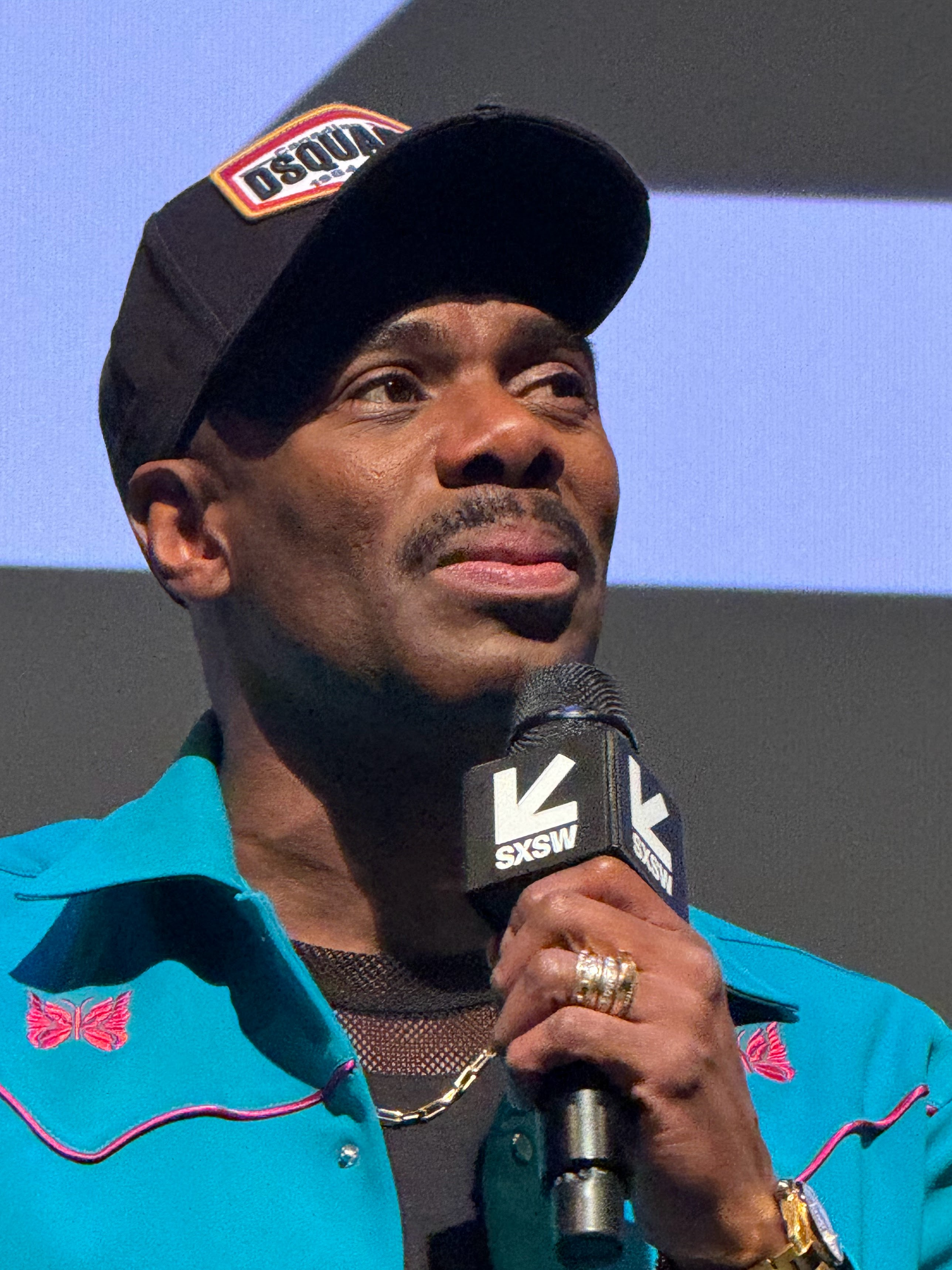
Top: Peter Cullen, Ron Perlman, and Peter Dinklage provide the voices for Optimus Prime, Optimus Primal, and Scourge.

Middle: Pete Davidson, Liza Koshy, and Cristo Fernández voice Mirage, Arcee and Wheeljack.

Bottom: Michaela Jaé Rodriguez, Michelle Yeoh, John DiMaggio, and Colman Domingo voice Nightbird, Airazor, Stratosphere, and Unicron.

In April 2021, Anthony Ramos was cast for the lead role in the film. Later that month, Dominique Fishback was cast opposite Ramos. It was also revealed that Darnell Metayer and Josh Peters had been hired to rewrite Harold's screenplay. Ultimately, Harold, Metayer, Peters, along with Erich and Jon Hoeber received screenplay credit, with Harold solely receiving story credit, while Ken Nolan, Tony Rettenmaier, Juel Taylor, and Vanderbilt received "additional literary material" credit off-screen.

In June, actress Lauren Vélez revealed that she has a role in the sequel. In the same month, Peter Cullen was confirmed to return as Optimus Prime for the film, and Ron Perlman was announced to be reprising his role as Optimus Primal from the Power of the Primes web series a week later. In July, rapper Tobe Nwigwe revealed that he had a role in the film, making his film debut. In October 2022, Caple Jr. revealed that Michelle Yeoh and Pete Davidson will voice Airazor and Mirage, respectively, in the film.

On December 1, 2022, additional members of the voice cast were announced, consisting of Peter Dinklage as the film's antagonist Scourge, Michaela Jaé Rodriguez as the female Terrorcon Nightbird, Liza Koshy as Arcee, who replaced voice actress Grey DeLisle from both Bumblebee and Revenge of the Fallen, Cristo Fernández as Wheeljack and voice actors John DiMaggio and David Sobolov from previous installments in dual roles for each actor. DiMaggio voices Stratosphere, an Autobot that originated from the toyline of Revenge of the Fallen and the Dark of the Moon video game from 2009 to 2011, and Transit, a Decepticon that turns into a transit bus. Transit was omitted from the final film due to poor test screening results, though the sole scene where he appears was animated. The scene was made available on home media releases. Sobolov, being the sole cast member from the Beast Wars animated series, voiced both the Terrorcon Battletrap and the Maximal Rhinox, though Rhinox does not speak in the finished product.

Caple revealed that more members of the voice cast will be revealed in the coming months and expressed interest in bringing Mahershala Ali to provide voice work. On April 6, 2023, two months before the film's release, Tongayi Chirisa was announced to be voicing the Maximal Cheetor. Cheetor's original voice actor, Ian James Corlett expressed his support to Chirisa in the role later in that same month. On April 27, 2023, after the release of the second trailer, Colman Domingo was announced to be voicing Unicron. Ahead of the film's release in the same week that June, Sobolov revealed he had an additional third role as Apelinq, the Maximal leader before Primal; Apelinq is a post-Beast Machines character that originated in fiction created for BotCon, the official Transformers annual convention from the early 2000s.

=== Filming ===
Principal photography began on June 7, 2021, in Los Angeles. Filming also took place in parts of Peru such as Machu Picchu, Cusco, Tarapoto, and San Martín, Montreal, New Mexico, Iceland, and Brooklyn. On October 20, it was announced that filming had officially wrapped.

=== Post-production ===
Rather than Industrial Light and Magic from the previous installments, the film's visual effects for the Transformers and Beast Wars characters were provided by Moving Picture Company and Wētā FX.

== Music ==
Jongnic Bontemps provided the film's score, after previously working with Caple on his directorial debut, The Land. Bontemps is the third composer in the series after Steve Jablonsky and Dario Marianelli. Recording sessions for the score began on March 27, 2023, at the Eastwood Scoring Stage at Warner Bros. Jablonsky would later be involved in the film's score. The score references tracks written by Jablonsky for Transformers (2007), namely "Arrival to Earth" and "No Sacrifice, No Victory", as well as Vince DiCola's "Unicron Medley" from The Transformers: The Movie (1986).

To keep the authenticity of the film's setting, Caple confirmed tracks from the rap groups Wu-Tang Clan and A Tribe Called Quest would be featured.

On May 18, 2023, the song "On My Soul", composed by Tobe Nwigwe and Nas and featuring Jacob Banks, was released as a single from the film's soundtrack.

On June 7, 2024, a new score album was released for the film's anniversary, featuring eight new tracks with Bontemps' ideas and rough sketches for the original album.

== Marketing ==
Paramount showed a sizzle reel of the film at their CinemaCon presentation in April 2022.

A teaser trailer was released on December 1, 2022. In an interview with BET, Caple discussed his decision to handpick the trailer's song, a remix of "Juicy" by The Notorious B.I.G. He explained it as the "perfect" choice since Notorious B.I.G.'s album "Ready to Die" was released in the 1990s, the time period the film is set in. He further said that Notorious B.I.G.'s "voice and what he meant in that era and time" captured much of what they were doing in the film. The trailer garnered 238 million views on YouTube in its first 24 hours, more than any previous trailer in Paramount's history, and was in fourth place for that 24-hour cycle behind two Avengers: Endgame (2019) trailers and the first Spider-Man: No Way Home (2021) trailer. In addition, the trailer also achieved 494 million global, cross-platform views in the first week, more than the view count of other film trailers released that week, such as those for Indiana Jones and the Dial of Destiny, The Super Mario Bros. Movie, and Guardians of the Galaxy Vol. 3.

A 30-second Porsche advertisement as a TV spot aired during Super Bowl LVII on February 12, 2023. Optimus Prime was featured at the Nickelodeon Kids' Choice Awards on March 4, 2023, for the Lifetime Achievement Award. Over a month later, Prime would then appear at Coachella 2023, presenting Tobe Nwigwe, one of the film's stars.

The trailer was released on April 27, 2023. It uses "Ruff Ryders' Anthem" by DMX. Many commentators highlighted the appearance of Scourge and Unicron as the main villains for the film, though some highlighted that the DMX song used was not released until 1998, four years after the film is set.

== Release ==
=== Theatrical ===
Transformers: Rise of the Beasts had its world premiere at Marina Bay Sands in Singapore on May 27, 2023, and was released theatrically in the United States on June 9, 2023 in IMAX, Dolby Cinema, 4DX, and RealD 3D formats. The film was delayed from its initial release date of June 24, 2022. Internationally, the film was released on dates ranging from June 6, 2023 (in South Korea), to June 22, 2023, the film's Australian release date. The film was released in Japan on August 4, 2023.

=== Home media ===
Transformers: Rise of the Beasts was released on Digital HD on July 11, 2023, and was released on 4K Ultra HD Blu-ray, Blu-ray and DVD on October 10, 2023. The film grossed $11.2 million in home sales.

== Reception ==
=== Box office ===
Transformers: Rise of the Beasts grossed $157 million in the United States and Canada, and $284 million in other territories, for a worldwide total gross of $442 million. It underperformed at the box office and became the lowest-grossing installment of the franchise.

In the United States and Canada, Rise of the Beasts was projected to gross $50–60 million from 3,673 theaters in its opening weekend. The film made $25.6 million on its first day, including $8.8 million from Wednesday and Thursday night preview screenings, up from the totals of The Last Knight ($5.5 million in 2017) and Bumblebee ($2.85 million in 2018). It went on to debut to $60.5 million, topping the box office. In its second weekend the film dropped 67% to $20 million, finishing fourth. It then made $11.6 million in its third weekend.

The film broke records in Peru, earning $6,165,943 in its opening week, and as of August 10, 2023, it is the highest-grossing film in Peru of all time, surpassing Avengers: Endgame, with earnings of over 52.6 million soles while also bringing in 3.7 million viewers. Peru was the fourth highest-grossing territory for the film, behind only the United States, China and Mexico.

=== Critical response ===
On the review aggregator website Rotten Tomatoes, 51% of 237 critics' reviews are positive, with an average rating of 5.2/10. The website's consensus reads: "Thanks to some genuine human drama between the set pieces and palpable affection for the title characters, Transformers: Rise of the Beasts is one of the franchise's more enjoyable outings." Metacritic, which uses a weighted average, assigned the film a score of 42 out of 100, based on 51 critics, indicating "mixed or average" reviews. Audiences polled by CinemaScore gave the film an average grade of "A–" on an A+ to F scale, while those polled at PostTrak gave it an 83% overall positive score, with 68% saying they would "definitely recommend" it.

Matt Donato of IGN gave the film a 7 out of 10, stating that "Transformers: Rise of the Beasts proves that Bumblebee wasn't a fluke, and that the Transformers series is finally accelerating in the right direction." Christy Lemire of RogerEbert.com, gave the film 2.5 out of 4 stars, and called it "better than most offerings in the franchise" but was critical of the lack of stakes, and emphasis on the set pieces over the human characters. Graeme Guttmann of Screen Rant awarded the film a score of two and a half stars out of five, saying "There are a few bright spots in Rise of the Beasts, but these are largely overshadowed by a lot of generic parts that would not be out of place in any of the previous six Transformers movies."

Chris Vognar of Rolling Stones said, "Beasts encourages you to let your eyes glaze over through the plot exposition and embrace the visceral nonsense. Beasts is dumber than a box of hammers, but it doesn't drip with the rote cynicism of, say, Fast X." Robbie Collin of The Daily Telegraph gave the film a 1 out of 5 rating and said, "Quake, ye mortals, before the Toys R Us Cinematic Universe: accessories sold separately; batteries, entertainment and point not included." Richard Roeper of the Chicago Sun-Times gave the film two out of four stars, writing "Never fear, though, the old-school adventure soon gives way to yet another fast-cut, murky, CGI-fueled action sequence. The stakes couldn't be lower, the excitement any less palpable. How many times have we already seen these too-long battle scenes in which computer-created machines and/or creatures bang into each other and tear each other apart while proclaiming it all ends today or some such thing?"

=== Accolades ===
Transformers: Rise of the Beasts was nominated for Best Summer 2023 Blockbuster Trailer at the 2023 Golden Trailer Awards. It received a nomination for Outstanding Visual Effects – Feature Film at the 2023 Hollywood Professional Association Awards. Bontemps was nominated for Best Original Score — Sci-Fi/Fantasy Film at the 14th Hollywood Music in Media Awards. The film was also nominated for Best Science Fiction Film at the Saturn Awards but lost to Avatar: The Way of Water.

== Canceled sequel ==
In February 2022, Paramount announced that Rise of the Beasts would be the first of three new installments in the Transformers series. In May 2023, it was also announced Paramount was also planning a crossover between the Transformers and G.I. Joe franchises. The ending of Rise of the Beasts hints at this being a possible future, with Noah being asked to join G.I. Joe. In July 2023, di Bonaventura stated that while the crossover would not interfere with the continuity of the franchise's first five installments, he believed that "continuity’s overblown, because sometimes you miss a great idea." The crossover was later officially announced at CinemaCon 2024, with Derek Connolly attached as screenwriter in June of that year. In the wake of the underperformance of the animated film Transformers One released later that year, Hasbro announced that they would no longer be co-financing film adaptations of their products, instead leaving external studios to exclusively fund such projects. Likewise in July 2025, Ramos noted the film's uncertain status due to the Skydance-Paramount merger. The following year in April 2026, Caple Jr. confirmed that the crossover is still in development. He expressed his hopes to be involved in some capacity. Later that October, the film was officially canceled, with Paramount instead moving forward with an upcoming G.I. Joe film directed by Danny McBride.

In August 2025, it was reported that Michael Bay was in talks with Paramount to return as both a producer and director for a new film based on a screenplay written by Jordan VanDina. The following year in June 2026, it was reported that Jason Fuchs would write a new film in the franchise. By October, Bay was in negotiations to direct the film, with executive producer Steven Spielberg being involved for creative input in addition to Fuchs serving as co-writer.
