= Bumblebee (film) =

2018 film by Travis Knight

- Theatrical release poster
- Directed by: Travis Knight
- Written by: Christina Hodson
- Based on: Hasbro's Transformers action figures
- Produced by: Lorenzo di Bonaventura; Tom DeSanto; Don Murphy; Michael Bay; Mark Vahradian
- Starring: Hailee Steinfeld; John Cena; Jorge Lendeborg Jr.; John Ortiz; Jason Drucker; Pamela Adlon
- Cinematography: Enrique Chediak
- Edited by: Paul Rubell
- Music by: Dario Marianelli
- Production companies: Allspark Pictures; Di Bonaventura Pictures; Bay Films; Tencent Pictures
- Distributed by: Paramount Pictures
- Release dates: December 3, 2018 (Sony Center); December 21, 2018 (United States)
- Running time: 114 minutes
- Countries: China; United States
- Language: English
- Budget: $102–135 million
- Box office: $468 million

Bumblebee is a 2018 science fiction action film based on the Transformers toy line character. Directed by Travis Knight and written by Christina Hodson, it is the sixth installment in the Transformers film series. It stars Hailee Steinfeld, John Cena, Jorge Lendeborg Jr., John Ortiz, Jason Drucker, and Pamela Adlon. Set in 1987, the film follows Bumblebee being sent to Earth for refuge and befriending a teenage girl named Charlie.

Development on a film featuring Bumblebee was confirmed in 2016, and Knight was announced as director in 2017. In contrast to past Transformers films directed by Michael Bay, Knight sought to create a more story-focused work, and drew inspiration from the original Transformers animated series and toy line. Filming took place in California from July to November 2017.

The film premiered on December 3, 2018, at the Sony Center in Berlin, and was released in the United States on December 21, by Paramount Pictures. It received generally positive reviews from critics, who praised its action sequences, Steinfeld's performance, Knight's direction, visuals, and the 1980s setting. It was a box office success, grossing $468 million against a production budget between $102–135 million. A sequel, Transformers: Rise of the Beasts, was released in June 2023.

== Plot ==
On the planet of Cybertron, the Autobots, led by Optimus Prime, are on the verge of losing their war against the Decepticons and prepare to evacuate the planet. Decepticon forces led by Starscream, Soundwave, and Shockwave intercept the Autobots during their evacuation, and Optimus sends Autobot scout B-127 to Earth in an escape pod to set up a base of operations while he stays behind to fend off the Decepticons. B-127 reaches Earth and crash-lands in California in 1987, disrupting a training exercise by Sector 7, a secret government agency tasked with monitoring extraterrestrial activity on Earth. Colonel Jack Burns presumes B-127 to be hostile and orders his men to attack the Autobot. B-127 scans a Willys MB jeep and flees to a nearby mine, where he is ambushed by the Decepticon Blitzwing. When B-127 refuses to reveal Optimus's whereabouts, Blitzwing tears out his voice box and damages his memory core with a spike-like blade in anger, before B-127 manages to kill the Decepticon with one of his own missiles. B-127 scans a nearby 1967 yellow Volkswagen Beetle before collapsing from his injuries.

Elsewhere, Charlie Watson, who is depressed by the death of her father and resentful of her mother Sally's relationship with her new boyfriend Ronald, finds the Beetle in a local scrapyard owned by her Uncle Hank, who gives it to her as an 18th-birthday present. When trying to start it, Charlie accidentally activates a homing signal that is detected by the Decepticons Shatter and Dropkick while they interrogate and kill Cliffjumper on one of Saturn's moons. The two Decepticons head to Earth, acquire human-made vehicle forms, and encounter Sector 7; pretending to be peacekeepers, they persuade the agency to help them capture B-127, despite Burns' objections.

As Charlie attempts to fix the Beetle, it transforms into B-127, whom she befriends and names "Bumblebee". She then unknowingly unlocks a message from Optimus urging Bumblebee to defend Earth, which restores some of his memories. They are discovered by Charlie's neighbor Memo, who agrees to protect their secret, while Bumblebee learns to use his radio to communicate. While left alone one day, Bumblebee unintentionally destroys Charlie's home and causes an energy spike that attracts Sector 7's attention. When Sally blames Charlie for the havoc, Charlie has an emotional breakdown and finally expresses her pain over her father's death and leaves with Bumblebee and Memo, only to be intercepted by Sector 7 and the Decepticons. Bumblebee is captured, while Charlie and Memo are returned home.

Charlie convinces her brother Otis to cover for her and Memo as they follow Burns to the Sector 7 outpost where Bumblebee is being held. While torturing Bumblebee, Shatter and Dropkick accidentally activate a message from Optimus and learn that the Autobots are coming to Earth. Dropkick then kills Bumblebee and Dr. Powell, but not before they alert Burns to the truth about the Decepticons. Charlie electroshocks Bumblebee back to life, restoring his memories, and he fights off Burns' agents so they can escape.

After evading the military with the help of Memo and her family, Charlie and Bumblebee pursue the Decepticons, who are using a radio tower at a nearby harbor to try and contact their allies on Cybertron. Shatter shoots down Burns' helicopter when he tries to intervene, but he is saved by Bumblebee. Bumblebee fights Dropkick and binds him with a chain, ripping him apart. Charlie deactivates the Decepticon beacon, only to be pursued by Shatter. Bumblebee destroys a dam wall, triggering a flood that causes a cargo ship to crush and destroy Shatter. Bumblebee and Charlie escape the army and later arrive on a cliff overlooking the Golden Gate Bridge, where Charlie, realizing that Bumblebee has a greater purpose, says goodbye. Bumblebee takes on a new 1977 Chevrolet Camaro form and drives off, and Charlie reunites with her family and Memo.

Bumblebee reunites with Optimus, who successfully escaped Cybertron. He praises Bumblebee for keeping Earth safe as they watch more escape pods enter Earth's atmosphere. Meanwhile, Charlie finishes repairing the Corvette she and her late father were working on and takes it out for a drive.

== Cast ==
=== Humans ===
- Hailee Steinfeld as Charlie Watson: An 18-year-old girl and former competitive high diver who finds and befriends Bumblebee.
- John Cena as Jack Burns: A former U.S Army Colonel and agent of Sector 7.
- Jorge Lendeborg Jr. as Guillermo "Memo" Gutierrez: Charlie's next-door neighbor who befriends Charlie and Bumblebee.
- John Ortiz as Dr. Powell: An agent of Sector 7.
- Jason Drucker as Otis Watson: Charlie's younger brother.
- Pamela Adlon as Sally Watson: Charlie and Otis's mother.
- Stephen Schneider as Ron: Sally's fiancé and Charlie and Otis's soon-to-be stepfather.
- Len Cariou as Uncle Hank: The owner of a junkyard where Charlie sources car parts.
- Glynn Turman as General Whalen: Burns's superior at Sector 7.
- Gracie Dzienny as Tina Lark: Charlie's mean-spirited classmate.
- Ricardo Hoyos as Tripp Summers: Charlie's classmate and Tina's boyfriend.
- Lenny Jacobson as Roy: A trailer park resident.
- Megyn Price as Amber: Roy's girlfriend.

In addition, Nick Pilla plays Sector 7 agent Seymour Simmons, an older version of whom was portrayed by John Turturro in previous Transformers films. Fred Dryer plays Sheriff Lock, a sheriff who enters into a high-speed chase with Charlie, Memo, and Bumblebee, while Edwin Hodge plays Danny Bell, an agent of Sector 7. Tim Martin Gleason appears in flashback sequences as Charlie's deceased father. Rachel Crow and Abby Quinn appear in deleted scenes as Charlie's friends Liz and Brenda respectively.

=== Voices ===
==== Autobots ====
- Dylan O'Brien as Bumblebee / B-127: A young Autobot scout who transforms first into an advanced yellow Cybertronian car, then a yellow 1942 Willys MB, before switching for a rusty yellow 1967 Volkswagen Beetle, and eventually a yellow and black 1977 Chevrolet Camaro from the first film.
- Peter Cullen as Optimus Prime: The leader of the Autobot resistance, who transforms into a 1987 Freightliner FLA semi truck.
- Grey Griffin as Arcee: An Autobot communications officer. Griffin reprises her role from the 2009 film Transformers: Revenge of the Fallen.
- Steve Blum as Wheeljack: An Autobot scientist, engineer, and inventor.
- Andrew Morgado as Cliffjumper: One of Bumblebee's fellow Autobot scouts who is executed by Dropkick on one of Saturn's moons.
- Kirk Baily as Brawn: An Autobot commando.
- Dennis Singletary as Ratchet: An Autobot medic.

==== Decepticons ====
- Angela Bassett as Shatter: A Decepticon triple-changer who transforms into a red 1971 Plymouth Satellite and a Harrier.
- Justin Theroux as Dropkick: A Decepticon triple-changer who transforms into a blue 1974 AMC Javelin and a Bell AH-1 SuperCobra.
- David Sobolov as Blitzwing: A Decepticon triple changer who transforms into a red and white McDonnell Douglas F-4 Phantom II and is responsible for removing Bumblebee's voice box, and damaging his memory core.
- Jon Bailey as:
  - Shockwave: The Decepticons' scientist.
  - Soundwave: The Decepticons' communications officer who has a minion named Ravage housed in his chest.

==== Transformers who appear in non-speaking roles ====
- Ironhide, an Autobot weapons specialist.
- Starscream, the second-in-command of the Decepticons and the leader of the Decepticon Seekers.
- Thundercracker, Skywarp, and Thrust, Decepticon Seekers under the command of Starscream.
- Ravage, Soundwave's minion who is housed in his chest.

The Decepticon forces consist of numerous generic Decepticon Seekers who transform into Cybertronian jets, many of whom are duplicates of Thundercracker, Skywarp, and Thrust.

== Production ==
=== Development ===
On February 12, 2016, it was announced that the sixth film in the Transformers series, Transformers 6, was slated for release on June 8, 2018, and it was later revealed that the film would be an untitled spin-off, featuring Bumblebee. On November 11, 2016, Deadline Hollywood reported that Paramount Pictures was moving forward with the project, with Christina Hodson announced as having written the script for the spin-off; Hodson was one of the female writers Paramount and Michael Bay had hired for the series' "writers room." Kelly Fremon Craig performed a rewrite of the script, but was ultimately not credited in the final product. Hodson said the film hadn't changed much since her initial 2015 pitch, and 2016 first draft, with the key elements and broad emotion strokes all staying true, although she notes the film had gotten bigger and more fun, including the addition of visiting Cybertron. Hodson elaborated "Pretty early on, I knew I wanted to tell the story of two broken people who are healing each other. So the broken girl and the broken car kind of felt like a romantic notion."

On March 2, 2017, Deadline Hollywood reported that Travis Knight was set to direct the film. In May 2017, it was revealed that the film's story would be set in the 1980s, and that it would feature fewer robots. In the same month, it was announced that the film's title was then Transformers Universe: Bumblebee. It was Knight's first live-action film, he compared working in live action to his previous work in stop motion, saying he treated scenes featuring the robots as if they were animated scenes, making extensive use of storyboards, breaking down the script and planning out all the details. The scene where Bumblebee explores Charlie's home, he described as "trying to get familiar with this unfamiliar world, it was a lot kind of like Sorcerer's Apprentice". Knight chose to set the film in the 1980s since it was the decade that the original Transformers TV series, of which he was a fan, was released. In spite of Knight's direction differing from the previous films' style, Bay never tried to force Knight to change the film's more story-focused direction, instead supporting Knight during production. Knight also used many elements from the original TV series and the G1 version of the franchise in the film, including the characters' original designs. Knight originally included Megatron when storyboarding the opening battle scenes on Cybertron but used other characters instead to keep continuity with Michael Bay's Transformers.

=== Casting ===
In May 2017, it was reported that Hailee Steinfeld was in talks to be the lead in the film, and she confirmed her involvement later in June. On July 11, 2017, Jorge Lendeborg Jr. joined the cast as the male lead. On July 12, 2017, The Tracking Board reported that Rachel Crow had been cast as well, though she did not appear in the finished film. The following day, more core cast was announced, including Jason Drucker, Abby Quinn, Ricardo Hoyos and Gracie Dzienny, though Quinn ultimately did not appear in the film. On July 22, 2017, it was reported that Pamela Adlon had been cast to play Steinfeld's character's mother. On July 31, 2017, John Cena was added as a lead, with Kenneth Choi and Stephen Schneider set for supporting roles, though Choi did not appear in the final cut. On October 2, 2017, in an interview promoting the home media release of Transformers: The Last Knight, Peter Cullen revealed he would reprise his role of Optimus Prime in the film. On December 11, 2017, it was rumored that actor Martin Short had joined the film's voice roster, though his scene was cut after test screenings. On May 31, 2018, Jess Harnell revealed he would reprise his role as the voice of Barricade from the 2007 film and The Last Knight, but the character did not appear in the final product.

On July 13, 2018, it was announced that Angela Bassett and Justin Theroux would be voicing a pair of new Decepticons, respectively called Shatter and Dropkick, the main antagonists of the film. On August 26, 2018, voice actor David Sobolov, who had previously voiced Depth Charge in Beast Wars: Transformers, Brawl in the 2007 video game, and Shockwave in Transformers: Prime, confirmed he would voice Blitzwing. On December 3, 2018, Lorenzo di Bonaventura revealed to IGN that Dylan O'Brien would voice Bumblebee. On December 9, 2018, about a week before the film's release, voice actress Grey Griffin stated at a special fan screening that she is reprising her role as Arcee from Transformers: Revenge of the Fallen. On the same day, voice actor and long-time Transformers fan Jon Bailey also detailed that he voiced both Shockwave and Soundwave in the film, both of which were previously voiced by Frank Welker in Transformers: Dark of the Moon.

=== Filming ===
Principal photography on the film began on July 31, 2017, in Los Angeles, San Francisco, Santa Cruz, Vallejo, and Mare Island, California, and was scheduled to finish on November 16, 2017, under the working title Brighton Falls. Filming concluded six days ahead of schedule, on November 10, 2017. Scroggins Aviation Mockup & Effects was hired to supply the two Bell UH-1H Huey helicopters in the film. One Huey was used for motion base (gimbal) stage work at Long Beach, California studios and the other filming location was at Mare Island peninsula in Vallejo, California where Bumblebee catches the shot up Huey piloted by actor John Cena before crashing.

Later in November 2017, the film was revealed to have changed its title to Bumblebee: The Movie (later being called simply Bumblebee), as well as having wrapped up filming.

=== Visual effects ===
Visual effects for the film were provided by Industrial Light & Magic, Cantina Creative, and The Third Floor, with Jason Smith and Tony Lupoi serving as the main visual effects supervisors.

The special effects team built a life size model of Bumblebee for reference, and to help Hailee Steinfeld act against on set. They built a full size copy of Bumblebee's head, chest and upper arms, with paint detail and light-up eyes.

== Music ==
=== Soundtrack ===
Hailee Steinfeld's single "Back to Life", from the soundtrack, was released on November 2, 2018. The soundtrack featured several songs from the 1980s, including "The Touch", which had featured heavily in the 1986 original cinematic Transformers movie, and was released on December 21, 2018.

=== Score ===
Dario Marianelli, who previously scored Knight's Kubo and the Two Strings, provided the music score for the film, making this the first time Steve Jablonsky has not scored one of the films in the franchise. The score was released on December 21, 2018.

== Release ==
Bumblebee was released in the United States on December 21, 2018, by Paramount Pictures. The date had initially been set for June 8, 2018. The first trailer was released on June 5, 2018, and two new trailers, including an international trailer, on September 24, 2018. The international trailer showed that Bumblebee was disguised as an old 1941-45 military style Willys MB before he became a Volkswagen Beetle.

On November 21, 2018, Paramount announced it would hold one-day previews for the film on Saturday, December 8, 2018, similar to the promotions Amazon Prime and Sony Pictures ran with the films, Jumanji: Welcome to the Jungle and Hotel Transylvania 3: Summer Vacation, and to fellow December 2018 release, Aquaman.

=== Home media ===
Bumblebee was released on Digital HD on March 19, 2019, and was released on 4K Ultra HD Blu-ray, Blu-ray and DVD on April 2, 2019. Bumblebee was also released on VHS on April 1, 2019, as a limited edition promotional item, but not for retail sale. The film grossed $39.2 million in home sales.

== Reception ==
=== Box office ===
Bumblebee grossed $127.2 million in the United States and Canada, and $340.8 million in other territories, for a total worldwide gross of $468 million, against an estimated production budget of $135 million.

In the United States and Canada, Bumblebee was released alongside Aquaman, Welcome to Marwen, and Second Act, and was projected to gross $20–25 million in its opening weekend, and $35–40 million over its first five days. Prior to its release, the film made about $500,000 at 325 theaters from its December 8 screenings, an "impressive" average of $1,500 per venue. The film made $8.5 million on its first day, including $2.15 million from Thursday night previews (a total of $2.85 million including the early screenings). It went on to debut to $21 million, finishing third, behind Aquaman and Mary Poppins Returns. It then grossed $3.8 million on Monday and $8.9 million on Christmas Day, for a five-day total of $34.2 million. In its second weekend, the film made $20.5 million, dropping 5% and remaining in third, and then earned $12.8 million in its third weekend, finishing fifth. Deadline Hollywood noted that the film would be profitable, due to the film's international box office performance and lower budget than its predecessors.

=== Critical response ===
On Rotten Tomatoes, the film has an approval rating of 91% based on 251 reviews, with an average rating of 6.9/10. The website's critical consensus read, "Bumblebee proves it's possible to bring fun and a sense of wonder back to a bloated blockbuster franchise -- and sets up its own slate of sequels in the bargain." On Metacritic, the film has a weighted average score of 66 out of 100, based on 39 critics, indicating "generally favorable" reviews. It is the highest-rated Transformers film on both websites. Audiences polled by CinemaScore gave the film an average grade of "A−" on an A+ to F scale, while those at PostTrak gave it an 85% overall positive score and a 68% "definite recommend".

Liz Shannon Miller of IndieWire gave the film a "B+" and wrote, "...there are many scenes where giant robots fight each other, and in those scenes, you can actually see what's happening. The Autobots and Decepticons toss each other around with slick judo-like moves and blast each other with abandon, and the cinematography and editing hold still long enough to let you enjoy each moment." Peter Debruge of Variety called the film a "quieter, more character-driven Transformers origin story" and wrote that "Bumblebee is basically the movie that fans of the 1980s animated series wanted all along." James Berardinelli of ReelViews writes "Surprisingly, Bumblebee is one of the best escapist films of the season" and "The movie works in large part because of the depth of Steinfeld's performance. We haven't seen such a well-realized character in any of the other Transformers movies." Glenn Kenny of The New York Times said that the film is "springy yet coherent, not, like previous films in the series, a digital-image blender set on high", and praised Steinfeld in particular for her performance. Leah Greenblatt of Entertainment Weekly said that John Cena "does get a disproportionate share of the script's best lines" and although the film is full of "sweet '80s nostalgia" Greenblatt praises Knight for using it "in ways that feel both familiar and somehow fresh."

Jesse Hassenger of The A.V. Club praised Hailee Steinfeld, saying, "her screen presence is the best thing about Bumblebee". He compared the film to The Iron Giant, but while finding many improvements over other Transformers films, Hassenger called the film "disappointing in the end, because it's still a careless stretch of blockbusting", giving it a "C+". Simon Abrams of RogerEbert.com was critical of the lack of originality and noted the various tropes borrowed from the films of executive producer Steven Spielberg. Abrams did not think the film even succeeded on its own merits, and said: "There's not only nothing new here, there's nothing convincing either".

In March 2020 at GalaxyCon Richmond, Peter Cullen said that during production of the film, he was brought in to dub over a temp track by voice actor Jon Bailey for Optimus Prime due to the character being fully animated in a single day, and had to match Bailey's delivery. As a result, he was disappointed at how his performance came across and the way he was treated.

=== Accolades ===
Bumblebee was nominated for the Razzie Redeemer Award at the 39th Golden Raspberry Awards, in the "Biggest Surprise of the Year" category at the 18th Annual Golden Schmoes Awards, and the category of "Best Song/Score - Trailer" at the 9th Hollywood Music in Media Awards. It was one of the 20 films among the 100 highest-grossing titles of 2018 to receive The ReFrame Stamp. Bumblebee was nominated in three categories for the 2019 Teen Choice Awards for "Choice Action Movie", "Choice Action Movie Actor - John Cena", and "Choice Action Movie Actress - Hailee Steinfeld". The film was also nominated for Best Science Fiction Film and Hailee Steinfeld for Best Supporting Actress at the Saturn Awards.

Award	Date	Category	Recipients	Result	Ref.
9th Hollywood Music in Media Awards	November 14, 2018	Best Song/Score - Trailer	Jochem Weierink	Nominated	
18th Annual Golden Schmoes Awards	February 22, 2019	Biggest Surprise of the Year	Bumblebee	Nominated	
39th Golden Raspberry Awards	February 23, 2019	Razzie Redeemer Award	Bumblebee	Nominated	
The ReFrame Stamp	March 6, 2019	2018 Feature Recipients	Bumblebee	Won	
20th Annual Golden Trailer Awards	May 29, 2019	Best Fantasy Adventure	"Epic" (Paramount Pictures, Create Advertising Group)	Nominated	
20th Annual Golden Trailer Awards	May 29, 2019	Best Home Ent Family/Animation	"Yellow Lightning" (Paramount Pictures, Paradise Creative)	Nominated	
20th Annual Golden Trailer Awards	May 29, 2019	Best Fantasy Adventure TV Spot (for a Feature Film)	"1987" (Paramount Pictures, Create Advertising Group)	Nominated	
2019 Teen Choice Awards	August 11, 2019	Choice Action Movie	Bumblebee	Nominated	
2019 Teen Choice Awards	August 11, 2019	Choice Action Movie Actor	John Cena	Nominated	
2019 Teen Choice Awards	August 11, 2019	Choice Action Movie Actress	Hailee Steinfeld	Nominated	
45th Saturn Awards	September 13, 2019	Best Science Fiction Film	Bumblebee	Nominated	
45th Saturn Awards	September 13, 2019	Best Supporting Actress	Hailee Steinfeld	Nominated	
2019 Golden Angel Awards	November 19, 2019	Most Popular U.S. Film in China	Bumblebee	Won	

== Sequel ==
In December 2018, when asked about the future of the Transformers franchise, producer Lorenzo di Bonaventura stated that "another big Transformers movie" would be produced and that it would be "different than the ones that we've done before." He avoided the term reboot and instead described the process as more of an "evolution", saying "There's more freedom than I think we originally thought in terms of what we can do". After the success of Bumblebee, he acknowledged that the series will make some changes in tone and style, inspired by the film.

Director Travis Knight said his goal was to return to his animation studio Laika, though he acknowledged that he has a few ideas for a Bumblebee sequel. Writer Christina Hodson said that "[she] knows where [she wants] to go with the next one."

In January 2020, a sequel was announced, with a script by Joby Harold. In November 2020, Steven Caple Jr. was hired to serve as director on the project. Another script, based on the Beast Wars franchise and written by James Vanderbilt, had also been commissioned, with Hasbro to choose between which film they would make. It was later decided to combine both Harold's and Vanderbilt's treatments into one script. Transformers: Rise of the Beasts was theatrically released in the United States on June 9, 2023.
