= Mark Vahradian =

American film producer

- Մարկ Վահրադեան
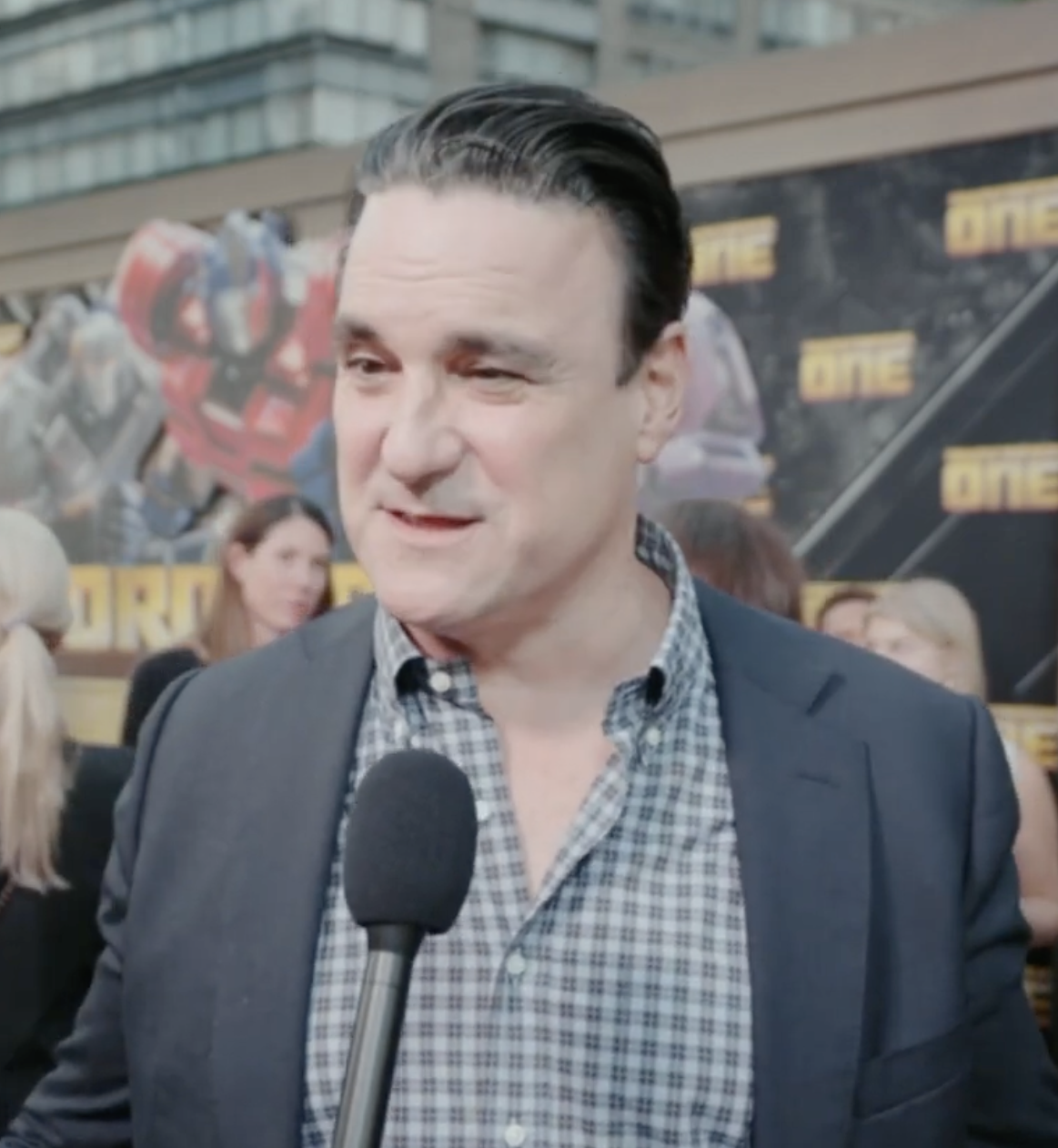
- Vahradian in 2024
- Born: 1967 (age 58–59); Mission Viejo, California
- Education: Duke University; University of California, Los Angeles
- Occupation: Film producer
- Years active: 1994–present

Mark Vahradian (Armenian: Մարկ Վահրադեան; born 1967) is an American film producer. He is best known for producing the Transformers franchise and Pet Sematary (2019). He serves as the president of production at Di Bonaventura Pictures.

== Early life ==
Vahradian was born into an Armenian family in Mission Viejo, California. He attended Mission Viejo High School, training with Mission Viejo Nadadores club as a swimmer. He later swam competitively at Duke University as a D1 athlete, where he majored in political science. He competed for the Duke Blue Devils from 1986 to 1988, and placed as one of Men's Swimming All-Time Letterwinners. In 1990, his brother was crushed to death due to an accident with a collapsed wall.

Following his undergraduate studies, Vahradian completed his Juris Doctor at the UCLA School of Law before pivoting to movie production.

In recognition of his extensive volunteer service to Duke University as an alumni, Vahradian earned the Forever Duke Award in 2017.

== Career ==
Vahradian initially joined Universal Pictures as an assistant, then later transitioned to Walt Disney Co. in 1994 as a creative executive before being promoted to director of creative affairs, then subsequently to executive vice president of production.

After eight years, he left Disney to join Jerry Weintraub Productions in 2003 as president of production, based at Warner Bros. He was involved in productions such as sequel 2004 film Ocean's Twelve.

In 2006, Vahradian went to Paramount Pictures as president of production for Di Bonaventura Pictures. He collaborated with producer Lorenzo di Bonaventura and director Michael Bay in the production of the Transformers film series.

He received a nomination for the Golden Globe in the category of Best Motion Picture – Musical or Comedy for the 2010 film Red.

=== Transformers film series ===
Vahradian has been a part of production for the Transformers franchise since its 2007 launch. He served as executive producer in the films Transformers (2007), Transformers: Revenge of the Fallen (2009), Transformers: Dark of the Moon (2011), Transformers: Age of Extinction (2014), Transformers: The Last Knight (2017), and as senior producer in Bumblebee (2018), Transformers: Rise of the Beasts (2023), and animated film Transformers One (2024).

== Advocacy ==
Vahradian is an advocate for reduction of taxes in the film industry. In May 2025, he interviewed with The Lead with Jake Tapper on CNN, expressing concerns on President Donald Trump's proposed tariffs on foreign-made films: "We would love nothing more than to make movies in the United States... but... sometimes that’s just not possible." In October of the same year, he led a delegation of high-end Hollywood producers to Spain to explore co-production partnerships with Zeta Studio, known for producing the Spanish TV series Elite, partly due to the country's lower tax rebate.

Vahradian serves as vice chair of Producers United, a collective advocacy group launched in June 2023 by career producers to promote fair compensation and recognition for their services in the Hollywood filming industry.

== Filmography ==
Producer

- Annapolis (2006)
- Red (2010)
- Man on a Ledge (2012)
- Red 2 (2013)
- Jack Ryan: Shadow Recruit (2014)
- Deepwater Horizon (2016)
- Puppet Master: The Littlest Reich (2018)
- Bumblebee (2018)
- Pet Sematary (2019)
- Infinite (2021)
- Plane (2023)
- Transformers: Rise of the Beasts (2023)
- Pet Sematary: Bloodlines (2023)
- Transformers One (2024)

Executive producer

- Transformers (2007)
- Nancy Drew (2007)
- Transformers: Revenge of the Fallen (2009)
- Salt (2010)
- Transformers: Dark of the Moon (2011)
- The Devil Inside (2012)
- Transformers: Age of Extinction (2014)
- Transformers: The Last Knight (2017)
