= Tom DeSanto =

American film producer (born 1968)

- Born: January 1, 1968 (age 58); United States
- Education: Rutgers University
- Occupations: Film producer; screenwriter
- Years active: 1998–present

Tom DeSanto (born January 1, 1968) is an American film producer and screenwriter.

DeSanto is a founding writer/producer behind several of the biggest franchises in movie history (X-Men, Transformers). DeSanto's films have grossed more than $5 billion worldwide with a per film average of more than $746 million at the box office, in addition to billions more in home video, merchandising, and video games. He has produced several social issue documentaries.

== Personal Life ==
DeSanto provided a character reference and support letter for convicted sex offender Brian Peck, ahead of Peck's sentencing relating to charges involving sexual offences against a minor. The reasons for DeSanto's support have not been publicly established.

== Early life and education ==
DeSanto was raised in the Iselin area of Woodbridge Township, New Jersey, the son of a police officer. He graduated from St. Thomas Aquinas High School (formerly known as Bishop George Ahr High School) in Edison, New Jersey in 1986 and from Rutgers University in 1990.

== Career ==
During his first years in the film industry, Tom met and befriended Bryan Singer, who got Tom a production position with his company, Bad Hat Harry, working on his movie Apt Pupil, followed by a partnered attempt to revive Battlestar Galactica.

=== X-Men & X2 ===
Later, Singer would co-write the movie X-Men with DeSanto and a few others before signing on as director, using most of DeSanto's original story. DeSanto is credited for the screen story, as an executive producer, and for a short cameo role as the police officer on Ellis Island who is squashed by Toad.

DeSanto then become part of the creative team and an executive producer for X2: X-Men United, including the continuation of the Phoenix story line which DeSanto set up in the first film.

=== Transformers ===
Tom wrote the treatment for and produced the Transformers movie for DreamWorks and Paramount. After being rejected by the major studios DeSanto made a second pass at DreamWorks Pictures. After Steven Spielberg read his treatment, he decided his studio would do the film. DeSanto set the project up with DreamWorks and Paramount, selling his story line and attaching to produce. DeSanto brought the idea to his friend and fellow producer Don Murphy and Hasbro gave them the rights for free. He is credited with being the originating producer on the project. This live-action version includes Steven Spielberg as an Executive Producer.

He is also producer for the 2009 sequel, Transformers: Revenge of the Fallen, its 2011 sequel Transformers: Dark of the Moon, 2014 film Transformers: Age of Extinction, 2017 film Transformers: The Last Knight, 2018 film Bumblebee, 2023 film Transformers: Rise of the Beasts.

The first film which released in the Summer of 2007 grossed over $700 million worldwide. Transformers was the first live-action franchise for DreamWorks and Paramount's largest moneymaking series in its history. DeSanto returned as producer of Revenge of the Fallen in 2009 and the film became the biggest moneymaker of the year with over $800 million in box office alone. DeSanto also produced Dark of the Moon, and Age of Extinction, both grossing over $1.1 billion worldwide. The Last Knight, produced by DeSanto as well, earned over $600 million in the box office.

After the Transformers saga had been released, DeSanto then produced Bumblebee, an origin story for one of the characters from the franchise, earning a total $470 million in box office.

== Other work ==
After leaving the X-Men film franchise, DeSanto has written several introductions to collected comics in both hardcover and trade paperback, including Superman: Red Son by Mark Millar, and Wolverine: Origin by Paul Jenkins. DeSanto also worked as a producer on the documentary film Ringers: Lord of the Fans released in 2005 by Sony Pictures Home Entertainment.

DeSanto was also involved in a Battlestar Galactica revival which fell through after the 9/11 attacks and scheduling delays forced Singer to concentrate on X2. Studios USA, wanting to push ahead with the series, replaced DeSanto and Singer with David Eick and Ronald D. Moore, who then created the "re-imagined" Battlestar Galactica.

In 2007 Variety reported that DeSanto, returning his attention to superheroes, secured the rights to NCsoft and Cryptic Studios' video game City of Heroes. The plan was to adapt the massively multiplayer online role-playing game into a live-action feature and then transition it to television in some form, but no further details have been heard.

In late 2007, he began production work as a writer and producer on Teen Titans: The Judas Contract, an animated cartoon based on the popular comic book, which was placed on indefinite hold by Warner Bros in February 2008. In 2016, WB revealed the film would be moving forward at the premiere of the animated adaption of The Killing Joke and in 2016 the film was released, but without him involved.

In July 2016, the estate of Gary Gygax bestowed him with the title of "Guardian of the Library" placing him in charge of Gygax's work that was under the estate's control and finding a place on TV, Film and other mediums.

DeSanto has produced several social issue documentaries, including Lost in America, which deals with youth homelessness, and Kidnapped for Christ, which puts a spotlight on abusive evangelical camps for children.

== Filmography ==
Producer

- Apt Pupil (1998) (co-producer)
- Ringers: Lord of the Fans (2005)
- Transformers (2007)
- Transformers: Revenge of the Fallen (2009)
- Transformers: Dark of the Moon (2011)
- Transformers: Age of Extinction (2014)
- Transformers: The Last Knight (2017)
- Bumblebee (2018)
- Transformers: Rise of the Beasts (2023)
- Transformers One (2024)

Executive producer

- X-Men (2000) (Also story writer)
- X2 (2003)
- Crisis: New York Under Water (2009) (Also director)
- Kidnapped for Christ (2014)
- Lost in America (2017)
