= Enrique Chediak =

Ecuadorian cinematographer (born 1967)

- Born: Enrique Chediak; June 7, 1967 (age 59); Quito, Pichincha Province, Ecuador
- Education: New York University
- Years active: 1995–present
- Website: www.enriquechediak.com

Enrique Chediak ASC (born June 7, 1967) is an Ecuadorian cinematographer, who works mostly in American features.

He was nominated for the BAFTA Award for Best Cinematography for his work on 127 Hours (2010).

== Early life and education ==
Chediak was born in Quito, Ecuador. He studied communication science in Santiago de Chile and photography in Madrid before studying film at New York University from 1992 to 1996.

== Career ==
Though having worked mostly with American indie films in the end of the 1990s and early 2000s, he shot his first native Ecuadorian film Crónicas in 2004.

In 2007, he shot the horror film 28 Weeks Later, which impressed executive producer Danny Boyle, prompting him to hire Chediak to shoot 127 Hours, while sharing a credit with Boyle's usual cinematographer Anthony Dod Mantle. This allowed Boyle and the cast work long days without wearing out the crew. Both cinematographers earned multiple accolades, including a nomination for BAFTA Award for Best Cinematography.

== Filmography ==
=== Film ===
Year	Title	Director	Notes
1997	Hurricane Streets	Morgan J. Freeman	
1998	Frogs for Snakes	Amos Poe	
1998	Desert Blue	Morgan J. Freeman	
1998	The Faculty	Robert Rodriguez	
2000	Songcatcher	Maggie Greenwald	
2000	Boiler Room	Ben Younger	
2001	3 A.M.	Lee Davis	
2001	The Safety of Objects	Rose Troche	
2002	The Good Girl	Miguel Arteta	
2002	Brown Sugar	Rick Famuyiwa	With Jeff Barnett
2003	Undefeated	John Leguizamo	Television film, also executive producer
2004	Crónicas	Sebastián Cordero	
2004	A Home at the End of the World	Michael Mayer	
2005	Down in the Valley	David Jacobson	
2006	The Alibi	Kurt Mattila; Matt Checkowski	
2006	Turistas	John Stockwell	
2007	28 Weeks Later	Juan Carlos Fresnadillo	
2007	The Flock	Andrew Lau	
2009	Rage	Sebastián Cordero	
2009	The Assailant	João Daniel Tikhomiroff	
2010	Repo Men	Miguel Sapochnik	
2010	Charlie St. Cloud	Burr Steers	
2010	127 Hours	Danny Boyle	With Anthony Dod Mantle
2011	Intruders	Juan Carlos Fresnadillo	
2013	Europa Report	Sebastián Cordero	
2013	Red 2	Dean Parisot	
2014	César Chávez	Diego Luna	
2014	The Maze Runner	Wes Ball	
2016	The 5th Wave	J Blakeson	
2016	Deepwater Horizon	Peter Berg	
2017	American Assassin	Michael Cuesta	
2017	Buena Vista Social Club: Adios	Lucy Walker	with Lucas Gath and Nick Higgins
2018	Bumblebee	Travis Knight	
2019	Lady and the Tramp	Charlie Bean	
2021	Voyagers	Neil Burger	
2023	Transformers: Rise of the Beasts	Steven Caple Jr.	
2025	A Minecraft Movie	Jared Hess	
TBA	Eleven Days	Peter Landesman	Post-production

=== Television ===
Year	Title	Director	Notes
2014	Babylon	Danny Boyle; Jon S. Baird; Sally El Hosaini	5 episodes

== Awards and nominations ==
Institution	Year	Category	Title	Result
BAFTA Awards	2011	Best Cinematography (with Anthony Dod Mantle)	127 Hours	Nominated
British Independent Film Awards	2007	Best Technical Achievement	28 Weeks Later (Cinematography)	Nominated
Camerimage	2010	Golden Frog (with Anthony Dod Mantle)	127 Hours	Nominated
Critics' Choice Movie Awards	2011	Best Cinematography (with Anthony Dod Mantle)	127 Hours	Nominated
Guadalajara International Film Festival	2010	Best Cinematography	Rage	Won
Kraków Film Festival	1999	Best Short	El Rio	Won
Málaga Film Festival	2010	Best Cinematography	Rage	Won
Online Film Critics Society	2010	Best Cinematography	127 Hours	Nominated
Prêmio ACIE de Cinema	2010	Best Cinematography	The Assailant	Nominated
Sundance Film Festival	1997	Best Cinematography - Dramatic	Hurricane Streets	Won
