= The Land (2016 film) =

- Theatrical release poster
- Directed by: Steven Caple Jr.
- Written by: Steven Caple Jr.
- Produced by: Tyler Davidson; Lizzie Friedman; Karen Lauder; Greg Little; Stephen "Dr" Love; Blake Pickens
- Starring: Jorge Lendeborg Jr. Moisés Arias; Rafi Gavron; Ezri Walker; Kim Coates; Linda Emond; Natalie Martinez; Machine Gun Kelly; Erykah Badu; Michael K. Williams
- Cinematography: Steven Holleran
- Edited by: Saira Haider
- Music by: Jongnic Bontemps
- Production companies: Low Spark Films; Priority Pictures
- Distributed by: IFC Films
- Release dates: January 26, 2016 (Sundance); July 29, 2016 (United States)
- Running time: 101 minutes
- Country: United States
- Language: English
- Budget: $1 million
- Box office: $43,756

The Land is a 2016 American crime drama film written and directed by Steven Caple Jr. The film stars Jorge Lendeborg Jr., Moisés Arias, Rafi Gavron, Ezri Walker, Kim Coates, Linda Emond, Natalie Martinez, Machine Gun Kelly, Erykah Badu and Michael K. Williams. The film was released on July 29, 2016, by IFC Films.

== Premise ==
Four Cleveland teens dream of escaping inner-city poverty and becoming pro skateboarders, but a car heist puts them on the radar of a local crime boss.

== Cast ==
- Jorge Lendeborg Jr. as Cisco
- Moisés Arias as Junior
- Rafi Gavron as Patty Cake
- Ezri Walker as Boobie
- Kim Coates as Uncle Steve
- Linda Emond as Momma
- Natalie Martinez as Evelyn
- Machine Gun Kelly as Slick
- Erykah Badu as Turquoise
- Michael K. Williams as Pops
- Robert Hunter as Elliot
- Michael Ray Escamilla as Chino
- Melvin Gregg as Brent
- Christopher Amitrano as Hassan
- Nadia Simms as Stacey
- Ashleigh Morghan as Janice
- Ryan Mulkay as Harry
- Tom Kondilas as Henry Bush Tits

== Reception ==
The review aggregator website Rotten Tomatoes gives the film an approval rating of 70%, based on 20 reviews. On Metacritic, the film has a score of 50 out of 100, based on 10 critics, indicating "mixed or average reviews".

== Release ==
The film premiered at the 2016 Sundance Film Festival on January 26, 2016. The film was released on July 29, 2016, by IFC Films.
