= Jongnic Bontemps =

American composer

Jongnic Bontemps, also known as JB, is an American composer and musician who has worked on over 50 projects in film, shorts, documentary films, TV series and video games. He is the music director for 2016 skateboarding-focused drama film The Land. The soundtrack features collaborations with Erykah Badu and Nas including the song "This Bitter Land". He also wrote the music for the 2018 roller skating documentary United Skates. The hip hop influenced documentary premiered at the Tribeca Film Festival.

Bontemps is a classically trained composer with roots in the church and jazz world as a pianist. He was born in Brooklyn to a Jamaican mother and a Haitian father, who met in New York in the 1970s. He studied music at Yale University, Berklee College of Music and the University of Southern California. becoming a graduate of the Scoring for Motion Picture and Television program at USC. He worked as a software developer and startup executive in New York City and later Silicon Valley before specializing in music. He was selected as a Sundance Lab Composer Fellow in 2013 and received a Time Warner Artist Fellowship in 2014. Bontemps' film Faith Under Fire, premiered on Lifetime in January 2017. His work has been heard in various award winning films at Cannes Film Festival, Warsaw International Film Festival, Pan African Film Festival, American Black Film Festival, as well as on television networks like HBO, BET, Disney and in various cinemas worldwide.

== Filmography ==
Films

- 2016: Sharia
- 2016: The Land
- 2017: Faith Under Fire
- 2018: United Skates (documentary)
- 2021: Citizen Ashe (documentary)
- 2021: My Name is Pauli Murray (documentary)
- 2022: Wedding Season with Raashi Kulkarni
- 2023: Transformers: Rise of the Beasts
- 2023: Jagged Mind
- 2025: Madea's Destination Wedding

TV series

- 2015: Class
- 2016: Alley Way
- 2019: College Behind Bars (PBS documentary miniseries)
- 2025: Boots (Netflix)
- 2026: Crime and Punishment in America (PBS documentary miniseries)

Video Games

- 2023: Redfall
