= Don Murphy =

American film producer (born 1970)

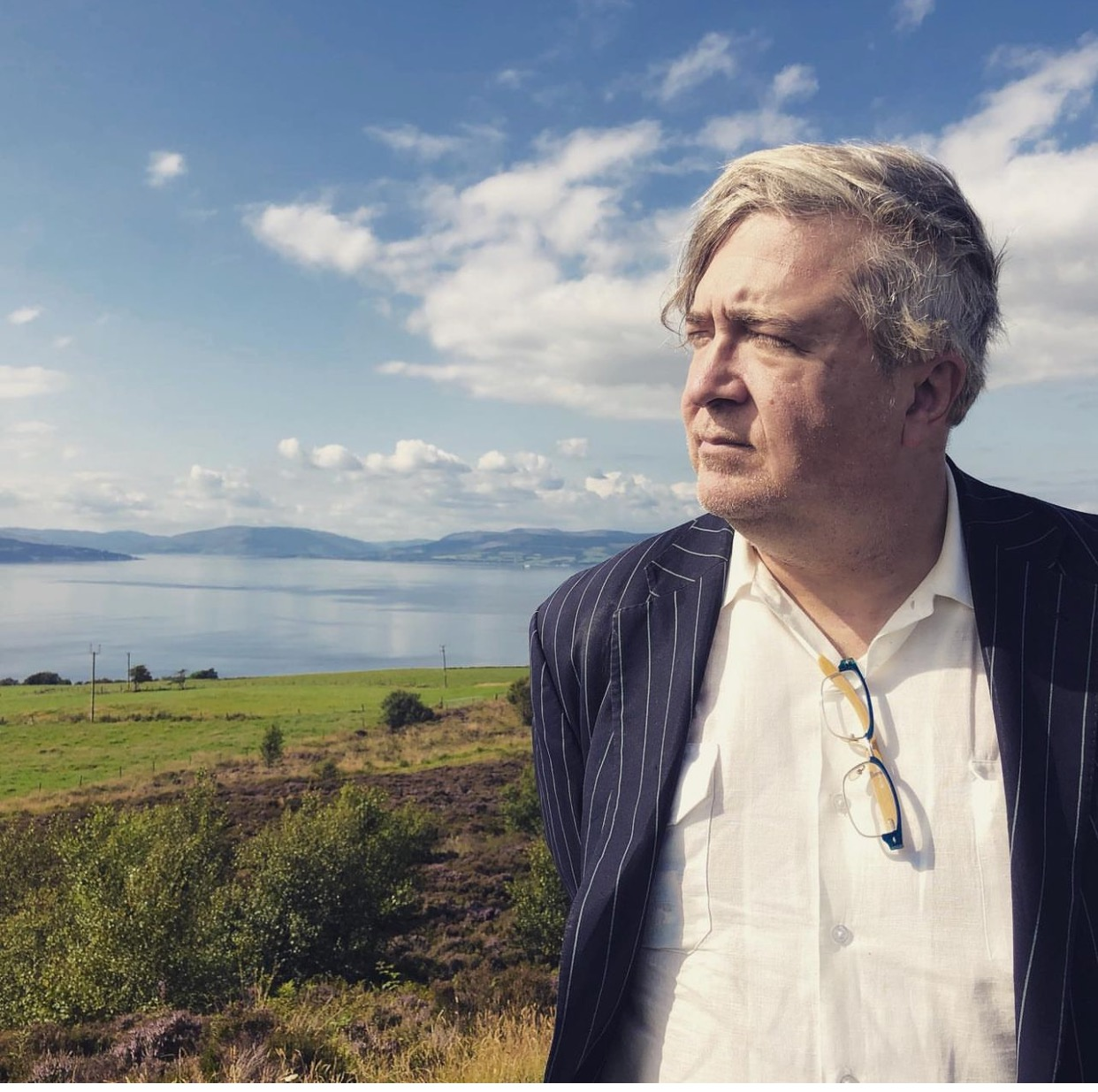
- Born: April 1970 (age 56); New York
- Education: Georgetown University; USC School of Cinema-Television (CNTV)
- Occupation: Film Producer
- Known for: Natural Born Killers (1994); The League of Extraordinary Gentlemen (2003); Transformers (2007); Transformers: Revenge of the Fallen (2009)
- Website: www.angryfilmsentertainment.com

Don Murphy (born April 1970) is an American film producer who produced Natural Born Killers, Real Steel, Splice and many other films, including Transformers and Transformers: Revenge of the Fallen and the 2026 re-imagining of the Faces of Death franchise.

== Personal background ==
Born in April 1970, Murphy grew up in Hicksville, New York and was educated at Chaminade High School in Mineola, New York. He attended Georgetown University and received a Bachelor of Science in Business Administration (BSBA) from the McDonough School of Business. Having excelled academically, he was accepted into Georgetown Law.

Murphy was the film critic for the Georgetown school newspaper, The Hoya, for three years, and in summer jobs at his father's advertising agency worked on ad campaigns for such films as Blow Out (1981), Under the Rainbow (1981) and Ragtime (1981). In 1986 Murphy realized that his calling lay in films rather than law; he enrolled in the School of Cinema-Television (now named USC School of Cinematic Arts) in California, where he had classmates including eventual directors Bryan Singer, Jon Turteltaub, Gary Fleder, and Stephen Sommers, and received a Master of Fine Arts.

He is married to Susan Montford, a film director, film producer, and screenwriter with whom he frequently collaborates.

== Career ==
After completing the graduate film program, Murphy teamed with Jane Hamsher to produce Natural Born Killers based on a script written by Quentin Tarantino, who was then unknown. Director Oliver Stone committed to direct the film, and he installed Murphy and Hamsher as on-set producers, which was described as "the equivalent of a crash course in filmmaking". Murphy said, "We wouldn't be where we are if not for Oliver." The film attracted attention upon release in 1994, and Hamsher documented the producers' involvement in the film in the best-selling book Killer Instinct.

In 1998, Murphy formed the production company Angry Films. He had an opportunity to see an unfinished cut of The Usual Suspects, which was directed by Singer, a classmate from USC. They decided to work together on Apt Pupil, based on a Stephen King novella and released in 1998. Murphy then worked as producer on the 2001 film Bully; its director, Larry Clark, was not impressed with the original screenplay, but committed to the film after Murphy encouraged him to read the book. Murphy also grew interested in adapting graphic novels by Alan Moore, such as From Hell and The League of Extraordinary Gentlemen, for film. He produced the movie From Hell, directed by the Hughes Brothers and released in 2001, as well as the film The League of Extraordinary Gentlemen, directed by Stephen Norrington and released in 2003.

Murphy and producer Tom DeSanto optioned rights to the Transformers toy line from Hasbro and pitched it to Hollywood studios. According to Murphy, the studios passed initially, but then began to express interest after further internal meetings involving younger staff, from the generation who had played with Transformers in their childhood. Paramount Pictures and producer Lorenzo di Bonaventura pursued the property, and DreamWorks got involved. DreamWorks executive Michael De Luca proposed the idea to Steven Spielberg, who took the project and convinced Michael Bay to direct the film. Transformers was released in 2007 and was a major box office success. During production, Murphy hosted a forum on his personal website so Transformers fans could discuss the film and make suggestions, enabling them to influence the film's script and casting. However, the forum remained Murphy's personal project, rather than an official site for the film, partly due to his corporate partners' unease about how the website might be perceived. Murphy was also one of the originating producers of the 2009 sequel Transformers: Revenge of the Fallen.

== Filmography ==
Director

- Monday Morning (1990)

Producer

- Natural Born Killers (1994)
- Double Dragon (1994)
- Apt Pupil (1998)
- Permanent Midnight (1998)
- Bully (2001)
- From Hell (2001)
- The League of Extraordinary Gentlemen (2003)
- Transformers (2007)
- Shoot 'Em Up (2007)
- While She Was Out (2008)
- Transformers: Revenge of the Fallen (2009)
- Real Steel (2011)
- Transformers: Dark of the Moon (2011)
- Vampire Academy (2014)
- Transformers: Age of Extinction (2014)
- Transformers: The Last Knight (2017)
- Bumblebee (2018)
- Transformers: Rise of the Beasts (2023)
- Transformers One (2024)
- Faces of Death (2026)

Executive producer

- Monday Morning (1990)
- Splice (2010)
- Gemini Man (2019)
