= Steven Caple Jr. =

American film director, producer, and screenwriter

- Steven Caple Jr. in 2023
- Born: February 16, 1988 (age 38); Cleveland, Ohio, U.S.
- Education: Baldwin Wallace University, University of Southern California
- Occupations: Film director, producer, screenwriter
- Years active: 2011–present
- Known for: The Land; Creed II

Steven Caple Jr. (born February 16, 1988) is an American film and television director, producer, and screenwriter. His credits include The Land (2016), Creed II (2018), A Different Tree, and Prentice-N-Fury's Ice Cream Adventure. In 2017, Forbes named Caple Jr. one of the "30 Under 30" in Hollywood & Entertainment. He also directed Transformers: Rise of the Beasts (2023), the seventh live-action Transformers film.

== Career ==
Caple caught his first big break when his student film A Different Tree won HBO's Short Film Competition in 2013.

Caple's feature film debut The Land premiered at the 2016 Sundance Film Festival, where it was acquired by IFC Films. It tells the story of four teenage boys who devote their summer to escaping the streets of Cleveland to pursue a dream life of professional skateboarding. The film was released on July 29, 2016. Caple would go on to be named by The Playlist as one of the 25 best breakthrough directors of 2016.

Caple recently wrote HBO's high-profile Emmett Till project, produced by Will Smith, Casey Affleck and Jay-Z. The six-episode miniseries is adapted from Devery Anderson's 2015 biography, Emmett Till: The Murder That Shocked The World And Propelled The Civil Rights Movement. It is based on the real-life story of 14-year-old black teen Emmett Till, who was brutally murdered after falsely being accused of flirting with a white woman in Mississippi in 1955.

Caple's next film was the 2018 sports action drama film Creed II, a sequel to 2015 film Creed and the eighth installment in the Rocky film series. Stallone said of appointing Caple as director: “I believe it's important for the director to also be a part of this generation like I was in mine, to make the story as relatable as possible. We are extremely lucky to have the talented young filmmaker Steven Caple Jr. step up and accept the role of director. I am confident that he and Michael B. Jordan will hit it out of the park!” Production of Creed II began in spring 2018. The film was released on November 21, 2018, and received positive reviews.

In June 2025, it was announced that Caple would launch his own production company, entitled Grey Skies. The company's first project will be a film adaptation of the Dark Horse Comics series The Ghost Fleet, previously written by Donny Cates and drawn by Daniel Warren Johnson. Caple will direct from a screenplay by Gareth Dunnet-Alcocer, with Paramount Pictures serving as distributor. In April 2026, Caple was confirmed to direct the sequel to I Am Legend (2007).

== Filmography ==
Film

Year	Title	Director	Writer
2016	The Land	Yes	Yes
2018	Creed II	Yes	No
2023	Transformers: Rise of the Beasts	Yes	No

Television

Year	Title	Notes
2018	Grown-ish	2 episodes
2018	Rapture	1 episode
2026	Man on Fire	2 episodes

Music video

- Machine Gun Kelly: "Dopeman" (2017)
