= If I Fall =

If I Fall may refer to:

- If I Fall, If I Die, a 2015 novel by Michael Christie

== Songs ==
- "If I Fall" (Tara MacLean song), 1999
- "If I Fall", by Amber Pacific from The Possibility and the Promise, 2005
- "If I Fall", by Cole Plante, 2014
- "If I Fall", by Doc Walker from Go, 2009
- "If I Fall", by Five Finger Death Punch from American Capitalist, 2011
- "If I Fall", by Matchbox Twenty from Exile on Mainstream, 2007
- "If I Fall", by Nick Jonas from Spaceman, 2021
- "If I Fall", by The Story So Far from Proper Dose, 2018
- "If I Fall", by Quavo, Ty Dolla Sign, and Brian Tyler's Are We Dreaming for Transformers One

== See also ==
- "If I Fall You're Going Down with Me", a 1999 song by Dixie Chicks
- "If I Fell", a 1964 song by The Beatles
- If I Should Fall (disambiguation)
