= List of Transformers film series cast and characters =

Transformers series logo for the original trilogy

The following is a list of cast members and characters from the Transformers film series and the tie-in video games.

== Cast and characters ==
Character	Transformers	Revenge of the Fallen	Dark of the Moon	Age of Extinction	The Last Knight	Bumblebee	Rise of the Beasts
Character	2007	2009	2011	2014	2017	2018	2023
Autobots
Optimus Prime/Nemesis Prime	Peter Cullen	Peter Cullen	Peter Cullen	Peter Cullen	Peter Cullen	Peter Cullen	Peter Cullen
Bumblebee	Jaxon Blackwell	Radio sounds	Radio sounds	Ben Schwartz	Erik Aadahl	Dylan O'Brien	Radio sounds
Jazz	Darius McCrary						
Ironhide	Jess Harnell	Jess Harnell	Jess Harnell	Photograph	Photograph	No voice actor	
Ratchet	Robert Foxworth	Robert Foxworth	Robert Foxworth	Robert Foxworth		Dennis Singletary	
Sideswipe		André Sogliuzzo	James Remar				
Wheelie		Tom Kenny	Tom Kenny		Tom Kenny		
Skids		Tom Kenny	Cameo	Photograph			
Mudflap		Reno Wilson	Cameo	Photograph			
Jetfire		Mark Ryan					
Elita-One		Grey DeLisle					
Chromia		Grey DeLisle					
Arcee		Grey DeLisle		Photograph		Grey DeLisle	Liza Koshy
Que/Wheeljack			George Coe	Photograph		Steve Blum	Cristo Fernández
Dino/Mirage			Francesco Quinn	Photograph			Pete Davidson
Sentinel Prime			Leonard Nimoy	Head			
Brains			Reno Wilson	Reno Wilson			
Topspin			No voice actor		Steven Barr		
Leadfoot			John DiMaggio	Archive footage			
Roadbuster			Ron Bottitta	Photograph			
Hound				John Goodman	John Goodman		
Crosshairs				John DiMaggio	John DiMaggio		
Drift				Ken Watanabe	Ken Watanabe		
Hot Rod					Omar Sy		
Cogman					Jim Carter		
Cliffjumper						Andrew Morgado	
Brawn						Kirk Baily	
Stratosphere							John DiMaggio
Decepticons
Megatron	Hugo Weaving	Hugo Weaving	Hugo Weaving	Head	Frank Welker		
Starscream	Charlie Adler	Charlie Adler	Charlie Adler	Photograph	Head	No voice actor	
Barricade	Jess Harnell		Frank Welker	Archive footage	Jess Harnell		
Frenzy	Reno Wilson	Head					
The Fallen Megatronus		Tony Todd					
Shockwave		Photograph	Frank Welker		Photograph	Jon Bailey	
Soundwave		Frank Welker	Frank Welker			Jon Bailey	
Ravage		Frank Welker				No voice actor	
Demolishor		Calvin Wimmer					
Laserbeak			Keith Szarabajka				
Igor			Greg Berg	Photograph			
Galvatron				Frank Welker			
Nitro Zeus					John DiMaggio		
Mohawk					Reno Wilson		
Shatter						Angela Bassett	
Dropkick						Justin Theroux	
Blitzwing						David Sobolov	
Other Cybertronians
Lockdown				Mark Ryan			
Grimlock				No voice actor	Cameo		
Slug				No voice actor	Cameo		
Quintessa					Gemma Chan		
Unicron					Offscreen		Colman Domingo
Scourge							Peter Dinklage
Nighbird							Michaela Jaé Rodriguez
Battletrap							David Sobolov
Apelinq							David Sobolov
Optimus Primal							Ron Perlman
Airazor							Michelle Yeoh
Cheetor							Tongayi Chirisa
Rhinox							No voice actor
Humans
Seymour Simmons	John Turturro	John Turturro	John Turturro		John Turturro	Nick Pilla	
Sam Witwicky	Shia LaBeouf	Shia LaBeouf	Shia LaBeouf		Photograph		
William Lennox	Josh Duhamel	Josh Duhamel	Josh Duhamel		Josh Duhamel		
Colonel Sharp General Morshower	Glenn Morshower	Glenn Morshower	Glenn Morshower		Glenn Morshower		
Robert Epps	Tyrese Gibson	Tyrese Gibson	Tyrese Gibson				
Ron Witwicky	Kevin Dunn	Kevin Dunn	Kevin Dunn				
Judy Witwicky	Julie White	Julie White	Julie White				
Mikaela Banes	Megan Fox	Megan Fox					
Glen Whitman	Anthony Anderson						
Maggie Madsen	Rachael Taylor						
Leo Spitz		Ramon Rodriguez					
Carly Spencer			Rosie Huntington-Whiteley				
Dylan Gould			Patrick Dempsey				
Bruce Brazos			John Malkovich				
Charlotte Mearing			Frances McDormand				
Dutch Gerhardt			Alan Tudyk				
Jerry Wang			Ken Jeong				
Cade Yeager				Mark Wahlberg	Mark Wahlberg		
Tessa Yeager				Nicola Peltz	Nicola Peltz^{V}		
Shane Dyson				Jack Reynor			
Joshua Joyce				Stanley Tucci			
Harrold Attinger				Kelsey Grammer			
James Savoy				Titus Welliver			
Darcy Tirrel				Sophia Myles			
Su Yueming				Li Bingbing			
Lucas Flannery				T.J. Miller			
Izabella					Isabela Merced		
Viviane Wembly					Laura Haddock		
Edmund Burton					Anthony Hopkins		
Jimmy					Jerrod Carmichael		
Charlie Watson						Hailee Steinfeld	
Memo						Jorge Lendeborg Jr.	
Jack Burns						John Cena	
Noah Diaz							Anthony Ramos
Elena Wallace							Dominique Fishback
Reek							Tobe Nwigwe

== Autobots ==
The Autobots are the main protagonists of the Transformers film series who come from the planet Cybertron.

=== Optimus Prime ===
Optimus Prime (voiced by Peter Cullen) is the main protagonist of the Transformers film series, the brave and valiant leader of the Autobots, the last descendant of the Dynasty of Primes and keeper of the Matrix of Leadership. Optimus Prime transforms into a 1994 red and blue Peterbilt 379 semi-trailer truck in the first three films, a rusty 1973 Marmon HDT-AC 86 semi cab-over truck in the beginning of the fourth film, and later a blue and red 2014 Western Star 5700XE Phantom semi-truck.

In the first film, Optimus Prime arrives on Earth with Ratchet, Ironhide, and Jazz trying to find the AllSpark. At Mission City, he kills Bonecrusher and battles Megatron, but Sam pushes the AllSpark into Megatron's chest, killing him and destroying the cube; as a result, Cybertron can no longer be restored. Afterward, Optimus and the other Autobots form an alliance with the humans and work closely with them, with the resulting alliance being called NEST.

In Revenge of the Fallen, Optimus is killed by Megatron during a battle with him, Starscream, and Grindor. Near the end of the film, he is revived by Sam with the Matrix of Leadership and is fused with Jetfire, making him more powerful. Optimus Prime then faces the Fallen and Megatron. After a vicious fight, Optimus severely wounds Megatron and kills the Fallen, telling him to "give me your face."

In Dark of the Moon, Optimus revives Sentinel Prime using the Matrix of Leadership and reveals he was the leader of the Autobots before him. However, Sentinel betrays the Autobots and joins the Decepticons to restore Cybertron with the Pillars; meanwhile, the Autobots are sent into space. During the battle in Chicago, Optimus kills some Decepticons, including the Driller, Shockwave, and Megatron before he kills Sentinel Prime. In the film, Optimus is depicted with a trailer similar to his Generation 1 counterpart, and has been redesigned to look more heroic. The trailer contains enhanced weapons and flight gear. Optimus loses his right arm to Sentinel Prime at the film's climax.

In Age of Extinction, he is hunted by Harold Attinger, Cemetery Wind, and Lockdown, who is working for the Creators to bring him to Cybertron and kill any Autobots who refuse to give up his location. A badly wounded Optimus is discovered by struggling inventor Cade Yeager, who shelters him. Escaping the eyes of Cemetery Wind, Optimus leads the Autobots once again, taming the Dinobots and rides Grimlock to fight Galvatron and his new army of man-made Transformers. After defeating Galvatron's army, he kills Attinger and Lockdown. He sets the Dinobots free and asks his fellow Autobots to protect Cade and his family before taking the Seed into space and going after the Creators. At the start of the movie, Optimus uses a mode similar to his G1 counterpart but with a lot of rust.

In The Last Knight, Optimus arrives at Cybertron, now a dead planet. He finds Quintessa, the Prime of Life, who brainwashes Optimus to do her bidding of destroying the Earth, which she reveals is an ancient enemy planet, Unicron. She tells Prime that he must retrieve her staff to rebuild Cybertron. Prime's eyes turn purple and becomes Nemesis Prime under Quintessa's control. Just as he is about to kill Bumblebee, Bee speaks for the first time in ten years, which causes him to return to normal. He rides Dragonstorm into battle. After defeating Quintessa and saving both worlds, Optimus and the Autobots return to Cybertron, which has joined with the Earth into one planet.

Optimus Prime reappears and appears similar to his G1 counterpart in Bumblebee. He leads the Autobots against the Decepticons trying to take over Cybertron, but is forced to retreat when Decepticon reinforcements led by Soundwave and Shockwave attack them. Realizing that Cybertron has fallen, he orders all Autobots to get to their escape pods. He gives Bumblebee the task to protect the Earth and set up a base for them before being attacked by Ravage and other Decepticons.

In Transformers: Rise of the Beasts, Optimus Prime reappears and appears similar to his G1 counterpart; he transforms into a Freightliner FLA-8664T semi-trailer truck, a form which he gained previously in Bumblebee. Optimus and his fellow Autobots had been hiding for the past seven years, waiting for a means to return to Cybertron. When the signal of a Transwarp Key is activated in Brooklyn, he rallies the other Autobots to investigate the signal, with Mirage bringing in a civilian named Noah Diaz. Despite Bumblebee's earlier encounter with a human, Optimus is distrustful of human help. Optimus comes face-to-face with the Terrorcons' leader, Scourge, who defeats him in combat. Optimus witnesses the deactivation of Bumblebee, making it his mission to avenge his fallen comrade. Bumblebee, who would be revived by an infusion of raw Energon, would be avenged as Optimus disarms Scourge and rips out his head, destroying the Transwarp Key to stop Unicron's advance.

=== Jazz ===
Jazz (voiced by Darius McCrary in the first film, Andrew Kishino in Transformers: The Game, Troy Baker in Rise of the Dark Spark) is the first lieutenant of the Autobots and Optimus Prime's second-in-command who displays a hip-hop-like personality. Jazz transforms into a modified silver 2006 Pontiac Solstice Weekend Club Racer concept, making him the smallest of the first film's five Autobots, and is armed with a crescent blaster and an electromagnetic device that he uses to take away the weapons of the Sector Seven agents who took Sam, and Mikaela. In spite of his size, he is a fearless and loyal soldier who is willing to jump into a fight with a larger foe, which leads him to get killed by Megatron during the battle in Mission City.

=== Bumblebee ===
Bumblebee (voiced by Mark Ryan in the 2007 film and the second video game, Fred Tatasciore in the third video game, Ben Schwartz in Age of Extinction, Erik Aadahl in The Last Knight, Dylan O'Brien in Bumblebee) is a loyal, courageous, and fun-loving Autobot scout, Hot Rod's brother-in-arms, and Sam's former guardian in the first three films, and later becomes Optimus' second-in-command in the following two. Due to his voicebox being damaged during the battle for Cybertron, he's hardly able to speak, only able to communicate through radio recordings and recorded movie and song quotes. Bumblebee transforms into various types of Chevrolet Camaros; the first four films depict him as fifth generation Camaros before switching to a sixth generation in The Last Knight. Bumblebee depicts him as a Volkswagen Beetle, and Rise of the Beasts depicts him as a second-generation Camaro.

In Transformers, Sam Witwicky purchases a dirty 1977 Chevrolet Camaro, but it reveals it's actually an Autobot, Bumblebee. Later Bumblebee turns into a 2007 Chevrolet Camaro. Bumblebee is wounded during the battle at Mission City, though is able to defeat Brawl with Mikaela's help. Throughout the movie, Bumblebee uses radio soundbites to communicate due to his vocal box being damaged in battle; the prequel movie Bumblebee attributes this damage to the hands of Blitzwing. However, Bumblebee regains his voice by the end of the movie.

In Revenge of the Fallen, Bumblebee once again uses radio soundbites to communicate due to the bugs of his voice, and Sam tells Mikaela that Bumblebee is "playing it up". Bumblebee is sad about Sam's departure from college, though they would be reunited after a brief skirmish with a Pretender named Alice. Later in Egypt, Bumblebee faces off against both Rampage and Ravage, who he defeats.

In Dark of the Moon, Bumblebee, now separated from Sam, assists NEST in the Autobots' mission to prevent human conflict. After Sentinel's betrayal, Bumblebee and his fellow Autobots were sent into space. Bumblebee would land the finishing blow on the control pillar, destroying it.

For Age of Extinction, Bumblebee is a modified vintage 1967 Chevrolet Camaro, and later a 2014 Chevrolet Camaro concept. He appears after Optimus calls all the Autobots and has a rivalry with Drift. He later aids Hound in a battle, kills Stinger, and rides Strafe.

In The Last Knight, Bumblebee transforms into a 2016 Chevrolet Camaro and is accidentally given a female voice akin to Siri. Near the end, his real voice speaks again to Optimus, turning him back to normal and snapping him out of Quintessa's brainwashing. Flashbacks reveal that he and Hot Rod were the first Autobots to arrive on Earth and fought alongside the Allied forces to fight the Nazi Party during World War II, and transformed to a 1937 Mercedes-Benz Typ 320. He also knows Edmund from when they first met before he met Sam, and has the ability to reassemble himself after being blown to pieces.

Bumblebee is the main protagonist of the eponymous reboot. He is redesigned to resemble his G1 counterpart but more Bay-inspired and transforms into a 1967 Volkswagen Beetle. In the film, he lands on Earth in 1987 after Cybertron falls to the Decepticons. After his synthetic voice communicator is ripped out and destroyed by Blitzwing, he escapes and befriends Charlie Watson. He comes into conflict with Decepticons Shatter and Dropkick, who are looking for him to learn Optimus Prime's location. After being captured by Sector 7, led by Jack Burns, Shatter and Dropkick interrogate him. Bumblebee manages to kill them, and he and Charlie part ways so he can be with Optimus Prime and the other Autobots.

Bumblebee reappears in Rise of the Beasts, looking similar to his look in his solo fim but with a changed head. Bumblebee is deactivated by Scourge before taking the latter's Autobot insignia off as a trophy and stealing the half of Transwarp key. During the final battle, he is revived by the Energon pulsing on Earth, with his arrival turning the tide of the battle.

=== Ironhide ===
Ironhide (voiced by Jess Harnell in the first three films, the second and third video games, Mark Ryan in Transformers: The Game, Keith Szarabajka in Rise of the Dark Spark) is the Autobots' scrappy English-accented weapons specialist who transforms into a modified black 2006 GMC TopKick C4500 medium-duty truck. Ironhide is armed with shell cannons. In Dark of the Moon, he has a new rifle and a new rocket launcher.

In Revenge of the Fallen, Ironhide is the new second-in-command of the autobots after Jazz's death. He is among the Autobots(the others being Optimus Prime, Arcee & her sisters named Elita-1 and Chromia, and Skids & Mudflap) who are sent alongside NEST soldiers to deal with the Decepticons Demolishor(who gets killed by Optimus) and Sideways(who gets killed by Sideswipe) in Shanghai, then later takes over as the Autobots' leader after Optimus is killed by Megatron in the forest. He leads the Autobots in the desert battle and helps Sam get to the pillars where Optimus's body lies. He is heavily damaged and forced to drop his heavy cannons during an airstrike.

In Dark of the Moon, he helps Sideswipe take down the Dreads as they chase Sentinel Prime to NEST. Sentinel betrays the Autobots and kills Ironhide with a cosmic rust gun that makes his parts rust & fall off. He also appears in a photo in Age of Extinction and The Last Knight. Ironhide also appears in the opening scene of Bumblebee.

=== Ratchet ===
Ratchet (voiced by Robert Foxworth in the first four films and the second video game, Dennis Singletary in Bumblebee, Fred Tatasciore in Transformers: The Game, the third video game and Rise of the Dark Spark) is the Autobots' pragmatic medical officer who transforms into a Los Angeles Fire Department Search and Rescue 2004 Hummer H2. Ratchet is armed with Energon beam guns and a saw. For Dark of the Moon, Ratchet's alt mode has a new green and white paint job. In Age of Extinction, he has his spark torn out by Lockdown and his corpse is taken to KSI, who melts his head to build remote-controlled Transformers.

Ratchet reappears in a speaking cameo in Bumblebee, looking like his G1 self, where he is among the Autobots seen evacuating Cybertron.

=== Sideswipe ===
Sideswipe (voiced by André Sogliuzzo in Revenge of the Fallen, Nolan North in the second video game, James Remar in Dark of the Moon, Travis Willingham in Rise of the Dark Spark) is the Autobots' combat instructor who transforms into a 2009 Chevrolet Corvette Stingray concept. He is argued to be the stand-in for Jazz after his demise in the first film. In Dark of the Moon, Sideswipe's vehicle mode is upgraded into a roadster. Sideswipe has blades for hands and uses his feet like roller blades when in combat. His fate in Age of Extinction remains unknown.

=== Arcee ===
Arcee (voiced by Liza Koshy in Rise of the Beasts, Grey DeLisle in Bumblebee and Revenge of the Fallen) is an Autobot sharpshooter who transforms into a red and white Ducati 848. Arcee is armed with a machine gun. Her holographic rider in Revenge of the Fallen is portrayed by Erin Naas. She and her sisters are shot by Decepticons.

In Age of Extinction, Arcee is listed as deceased by Cemetery Wind.

She reappears in Bumblebee as one of the few Autobots who left Cybertron in escape pods and is a member of the Autobot resistance.

Arcee appears in Rise of the Beasts, where she is one of the few Autobots on Earth. She transforms into a Ducati 916.

=== Mirage(AKA Dino) ===
Mirage(AKA Dino) (Note: Known as Dino in Dark of the Moon) (voiced by Francesco Quinn in Dark of the Moon and voiced by Pete Davidson in Rise of the Beasts) is an Autobot spy who has wrist blades and as of the year 2012 transforms into a red 2011 Ferrari 458 Italia, and speaks with an Italian accent. This was Quinn's final role before his death shortly after the film's release. Dino was originally set to die alongside Que, though he ultimately survives. A prop used in filming depicting Dino's head could be spotted in the background in a scene in the final film.

In Rise of the Beasts, he transforms into a 1993 Porsche 911 (964) Carrera RS 3.8 and possesses the ability to holographically create clones, similar to his G1 counterpart, and displays a fun-loving and groovy attitude. Throughout the events of the film, Mirage forms a close friendship with the human Noah Diaz and his younger brother Kris, promising to protect the two no matter the cost. Mirage, covering fire for Noah and staying true to his promise, is gravely wounded by Scourge but transforms his damaged body into a powered exo-suit for Noah so they can fight together. Noah would manage to repair Mirage, as revealed in the mid-credits scene.

=== Que ===
Que (Note: Known as Que in Dark of the Moon) (voiced by George Coe in Dark of the Moon) is an eccentric Autobot military scientist who speaks with an Irish accent, whose head design resembles Albert Einstein in reference to his genius and he transforms into a blue 2011 Mercedes-Benz E550. Wheeljack is an inventor who gives the Autobots weapons and equipment he has created. His name and appearance in Dark of the Moon is similar to the James Bond character Q. He is killed by Barricade when Soundwave orders his execution before they were killed as well by Bumblebee.

Wheeljack

In Bumblebee, Wheeljack (voiced by Steve Blum in Bumblebee, Cristo Fernández in Rise of the Beasts) is one of the Autobots who escaped Cybertron in an escape pod.

In Rise of the Beasts, Wheeljack transforms into a customized brown and white 1970 Volkswagen Type 2, speaks with a Mexican Spanish accent, and inexplicably has a completely different appearance.

=== Hound ===
Hound (voiced by John Goodman in the films, Daniel Ross in Transformers: The Game) is a trigger-happy but loyal and good-natured Autobot commando who transforms into a dark green Oshkosh Defense Medium Tactical Truck in Age of Extinction. Hound is the heavy weapons expert of the small group that carries various types of guns, grenades, and a knife. He is one of the few autobots to survive Lockdown and Cemetery Wind's Earthbound Autobot genocide.

Hound returns in The Last Knight, having an olive green Mercedes-Benz Unimog military tactical ambulance as his vehicle mode and acting as the medic after Ratchet's death.

=== Drift ===
Drift (voiced by Ken Watanabe in the films, Chris Jai Alex in Rise of the Dark Spark) is an Autobot tactician, a former Decepticon, and a Triple Changer who transforms into a black and blue 2013 Bugatti Veyron Grand Sport Vitesse and a Sikorsky S-97 Raider. He is one of the few Autobots to survive Lockdown and Cemetery Wind's genocide against all Earthbound Cybertronians. His robot is modeled after a samurai warrior with a braided beard. Drift is partnered with Dinobot Slug, who he rides into battle at the film's climax. Although mostly calm and collected, Drift tends to resort to violence when something annoys or surprises him. He also has contempt for Bumblebee.

Drift returns in The Last Knight as a black and red 2017 Mercedes-AMG GT-R, abandoning his helicopter mode.

=== Crosshairs ===
Crosshairs (voiced by John DiMaggio) is a brash and cocky Autobot paratrooper and sniper who transforms into a green 2014 Chevrolet Corvette Stingray in Age of Extinction. He is one of the few Autobots to survive Lockdown and Cemetery Wind's genocide against all Cybertronians. He rides Scorn into battle at the film's climax and later nicknames him Spike after Sam's G1 name. Although he shares the altruistic views as the rest of the Autobots, his ego leaves him to have a misplaced belief that he deserves to be in command of the team.

Crosshairs returns in The Last Knight as a green 2017 Corvette Stingray.

=== Hot Rod ===
Hot Rod (voiced by Omar Sy) is an Autobot protector, Bumblebee's brother-in-arms and Viviane's guardian who was first seen as a 1975 Citroën DS in disguise, and then transforming into an orange and black 2016 Lamborghini Centenario sports car. Hot Rod speaks with a French accent, much to his own embarrassment. In flashbacks, he and Bumblebee helped fight the Nazis during World War II.

=== Wheelie ===
Wheelie (voiced by Tom Kenny) is a wisecracking Decepticon-spy-turned-Autobot and a partner of Decepticon-turned-Autobot Brains who transforms into a blue radio-controlled Ford F-Series monster truck, and speaks with a Brooklyn accent.

In The Last Knight, Wheelie joins the other Autobots in Cade's junkyard.

=== Brains ===
Brains (voiced by Reno Wilson) is a small and intelligent Decepticon drone turned Autobot and a partner of Wheelie who transforms into a Lenovo ThinkPad Edge laptop computer. Brains is armed with a mini-shotgun. In Dark of the Moon, Brains loses his right leg after crashing into a river inside a Decepticon ship.

In Age of Extinction, Brains reappears, imprisoned by KSI. His fate in The Last Knight is unknown.

=== Stratosphere ===
Stratosphere (voiced by John DiMaggio in the film, Travis Willingham in the third video game) is an Autobot Air-Soldier who transforms into a Fairchild C-119 Flying Boxcar cargo plane that provides transportation for the Autobots in their global adventure who debuts in Rise of the Beasts. He speaks in a Scottish accent.

=== Dinobots ===
The Dinobots are the large Cybertronian Knights who transform into giant mechanical spiked dinosaurs. In Age of Extinction, they are captured inside of their ship, which Lockdown took over as his prison ship, until they are freed by Optimus. In The Last Knight, only Grimlock and Slug reappear.

==== Grimlock ====
Grimlock (voiced by Gregg Berger in Rise of the Dark Spark) is the leader of the Dinobots who transforms into a horned mechanical fire-breathing Tyrannosaurus, and formerly partnered with Optimus to ride on him.

==== Strafe ====
Strafe is one of the Dinobots who specializes in assault infantry and transforms into a mechanical two-headed, two-tailed Pteranodon, and formerly partnered with Bumblebee. He is similar to the Dinobot Swoop.

==== Slug ====
Slug is the savage destroyer amongst the Dinobots who transforms into a mechanical spiked and bestial Triceratops and formerly partnered with Drift.

==== Scorn ====
Scorn is the Dinobots' demolition specialist who appears in Age of Extinction and transforms into a mechanical three-sailed Spinosaurus and formerly partnered with Crosshairs.

=== Wreckers ===
The Wreckers are a trio of Autobot commandoes and engineers who transform into heavily armed NASCAR Sprint Cup Series Car of Tomorrow Chevrolet Impala stock cars as disguises. Two represent Hendrick Motorsports and one represents Earnhardt Ganassi Racing. They also worked on the Autobot ship called the Xantium, which the 3 of them and the other Earthbound Autobots who were introduced in Revenge of The Fallen and Dark of The Moon(except for Wheelie & Brains and Sentinel Prime) arrived on Earth in.

==== Leadfoot ====
Leadfoot (voiced by John DiMaggio) is the Wreckers' leader who transforms into an armored version of the No. 42 Earnhardt Ganassi Racing Target car driven at the time by Juan Pablo Montoya. Leadfoot is armed with general-purpose machine guns and a right shoulder multi-barrel machine gun.

In Age of Extinction, he appears in drone video footage, being attacked and killed by Cemetery Wind agents or Lockdown. Cade, who hacks a Cemetery Wind's spy drone, shows the footage to the Autobots, compelling Hound to salute his fallen friend.

==== Roadbuster ====
Roadbuster (voiced by Ron Bottitta) is the second-in-command of the Wreckers who transforms into an armored version of the No. 88 Hendrick Motorsports AMP Energy/National Guard driven by Dale Earnhardt Jr. and speaks with a Scottish accent. Roadbuster is armed with light machine guns, a left shoulder multi-barrel machine gun, and shoulder rocket launchers. Roadbuster's fate after the events of Age of Extinction is unknown.

==== Topspin ====
Topspin (voiced by Steven Barr) is one of the three Wreckers who transforms into an armored version of the No. 48 Hendrick Motorsports Lowe's/Kobalt driven by Jimmie Johnson, and appears to have claws on his hands. Topspin is armed with heavy machine guns.

In The Last Knight, he is seen in Cuba under the protection of Seymour Simmons and credited as "Volleybot".

=== Other Autobots ===
- Jolt is a technician Autobot armed with a pair of electro-whips that transforms into a blue 2008 Chevrolet Volt prototype. He appears in Revenge of the Fallen where he used his whips to fuse Jetfire's parts onto Optimus. Jolt does not appear in Dark of the Moon as he, in ancillary media released before the film's theatrical release, was depicted as likely killed by Shockwave.
- The Twins are the result of a split Spark that resulted in two Autobots. The Twins were cut from Dark of the Moon following criticism of Revenge of the Fallen, though the novelization and comic book adaptions show that they were both killed by Sentinel Prime. The Twins appear briefly in the final film in their vehicle modes.
  - Skids (voiced by Tom Kenny) is an Autobot infiltrator and Mudflap's twin who transforms into the front half of a white/pink 1937 Dodge ice cream truck, and later a green 2007 Chevrolet Beat concept. He has an oversized right arm. Skids is armed with a grappling hook.
  - Mudflap (voiced by Reno Wilson) is an Autobot infiltrator and Skids's twin who transforms into the back half of a white/pink Dodge Ice Cream truck, and later an orange 2007 Chevrolet Trax concept. He has an oversized left arm.
- Chromia is one of Arcee's sisters who transforms into a blue 2008 Suzuki B-King. Chromia is armed with a machine gun. Her holographic rider is portrayed by Erin Naas. She is the only one seen to be functional at the end of the film, but Roberto Orci and Alex Kurtzman claimed that all the sisters were shot in the Battle of Egypt.
- Elita-One is another of Arcee's sisters who transforms into a purple MV Agusta F4 R312. Elita-One is armed with a machine gun. Her holographic rider is portrayed by Erin Naas. She is shot & killed by an unnamed Decepticon.
- Jetfire (voiced by Mark Ryan in the film, Clive Revill in the second video game, Troy Baker in Rise of the Dark Spark) is a Cockney-accented Seeker and former-Decepticon-turned-Autobot who transforms into a Lockheed SR-71 Blackbird. Jetfire is armed with a rocket launcher. His wounds and age have led him to believe that there is no sense in living in a world filled with anger and hate, leading him to choose to fight on the side of the Autobots. He walks with a cane, which doubles as a battle axe. He sacrifices his spark to allow Optimus Prime to use his components and weaponry to destroy the Fallen.
- Sentinel Prime (voiced by Leonard Nimoy) is another descendant of the Dynasty of Primes, the first leader of the Autobots and the captain of the Ark who transforms into a red and black Rosenbauer Panther 6x6 airport crash tender fire truck. Sentinel Prime appears as one of the two main antagonists of Dark of the Moon, alongside Megatron, where it is revealed that he had made a secret deal with Megatron to restore Cybertron by using the Pillars to transport Cybertron to another inhabited planet's atmosphere, and use said inhabitants as slave labor, with Megatron deciding to have Earth be that planet after learning about the presence of Sentinel and the Pillars on Earth's moon from Soundwave. After Bumblebee and Ratchet destroy the Pillars and Megatron interferes with his fight against Optimus, Sentinel is killed by Optimus. His head makes a cameo appearance at the KSI building in Age of Extinction and is not converted into Transformium.
- Sqweeks (voiced by Reno Wilson) is a small Autobot 1965 Vespa 150 Scooter (motorcycle) and Izabella's only friend who struggles to communicate and has trouble transforming due to prior damage, and has the ability to change his new arm into a gun.
- Cogman (voiced by Jim Carter) is a polite but sociopathic Headmaster who acts as Sir Edmund Burton's butler. Despite his status, his Headmaster ability is not demonstrated.
- Canopy (voiced by an uncredited actor) is an Autobot refugee who disguises himself as a pile of rubble and is friends with Izabella and Sqweeks. He is mistakenly shot down and killed by TRF, believing him to be a Decepticon trying to harm kids who had trespassed into a restricted zone. When Izabella vows to repair him, Canopy tells her to run and thanks her for her companionship.
- Daytrader (voiced by Steve Buscemi) is an Autobot scavenger who transforms into a cloaked rusty Mercedes-Benz LK Model dump truck. He is seen arriving at Cade's junkyard after salvaging old Transformers parts from old battles for profit and finding a ship for the Autobots to leave. Daytrader is similar to the Autobot Wreck-Gar. He is wildly disliked by the other Autobots. Bumblebee once swore at him because of Daytrader giving him a female voice.
- Trench is an Autobot who has a similar body to Scrapper and transforms into a yellow Caterpillar 320 excavator. He made a cameo in The Last Knight, transforming when the Decepticons are approaching Cade's junkyard, forcing Cade, the Autobots, and the others to escape. His fate is unknown.
- Cliffjumper (voiced by Andrew Morgado) is an Autobot lieutenant who appears in Bumblebee. While on the Moons of Saturn sometime after the evacuation of Cybertron, Cliffjumper is killed by Dropkick after refusing to reveal the location of Optimus Prime before Bumblebee kills Dropkick on Earth. Chronologically, he is the first Autobot to be killed and die onscreen.
- Brawn (voiced by Kirk Baily) is an Autobot who made an appearance in Bumblebee being among the Autobots that evacuated Cybertron. Brawn looks like his G1 self.
- The Mini Dinobots are a group of small counterparts to Grimlock, Strafe and Slug. They appear with Grimlock and Slug and live in Cade's junkyard; the only Dinobot who does not have a mini counterpart is Scorn. Sharp T! is a mini version of Grimlock who learns to spit fire just like Grimlock. 'Tops is a mini version of Slug. Pterry is a mini version of Strafe with only one head. He is mentioned to be trained by Cade Yeager.
- Edmund Burton's Autobot Allies: A group of Autobots that are allied with Sir Edmund Burton and Cogman.
  - Bulldog (voiced by Mark Ryan) is an Autobot who acts as a sentry for Sir Edmund Burton's castle, wears a peaked cap and a monocle, and transforms into an army green Mark IV tank. Bulldog suffers from "robot dementia" where he thinks that World War I is still happening.
  - Lieutenant (voiced by Mark Ryan) resembles a tweaked version of Jetfire and transforms into a Supermarine Spitfire (although this is not shown). He made a cameo in The Last Knight within Edmund's castle in response to the TRF's arrival, but crashed to the ground due to arthritis.
  - An unidentified HMS Alliance submarine Autobot takes Cade, Viviane, Cogman and Bumblebee to the Knights' sunken ship to recover the Staff of Merlin in The Last Knight who does not transform on screen, but is mentioned to be a Transformer by Santos and is referred to as "she". Concept art identified the character as “Nautica”.

== Maximals ==
The Maximals are a faction of Transformers that debut in Rise of the Beasts and sport techno-organic modes themed on Earth animals. They came from an unknown jungle-covered planet before it was devoured by Unicron.

=== Optimus Primal ===
Optimus Primal (voiced by Ron Perlman) is the leader of the Maximals who transforms into an eastern lowland gorilla. In robot mode, he wields two kukris which can fuse into a double-bladed sword.

=== Cheetor ===
Cheetor (voiced by Tongayi Chirisa) is a Maximal scout who transforms into a Southeast African cheetah. In his robot mode, he wields a spear which can split to two.

=== Rhinox ===
Rhinox is a Maximal commando who transforms into a south-central black rhinoceros. In his robot mode, he wields a war hammer. He is the only Maximal that doesn't speak.

=== Airazor ===
Airazor (voiced by Michelle Yeoh) is a Maximal warrior who transforms into a peregrine falcon. She guided the Autobots and their human allies to her fellow Maximals. She gets driven mad by Scourge with Unicron's Dark Energon before she tells Optimus Primal to put her out of her misery. Airazor was avenged when Scourge is killed.

=== Apelinq ===
Apelinq (voiced by David Sobolov) is the former leader of the Maximals who transforms into a mountain gorilla. He has a similar appearance to Optimus Primal, but with a different color scheme involving bronze and silver, owns bigger fangs on the higher mandible, a left shoulder that seems to be asymmetrical to the right (being slightly more bulked up), and wields retractable axe blades on his forearm; and his gorilla mode is albino with orange optics instead of greens. After a brief scuffle with the Maximal, Apelinq is mortally wounded by Scourge before taking the latter's Maximal insignia as a trophy, but was too late to stop Optimus Primal and the rest of the Maximals from escaping the planet with the Transwarp Key before Unicron arrived and destroying their homeworld.

== Decepticons ==
The Decepticons are the main antagonists of the Transformers film series and the enemies of the Autobots.

In five films, 48 Decepticons have appeared in the series.

=== Megatron ===
Megatron (voiced by Hugo Weaving in the first three films, Frank Welker in The Last Knight and the first two video games, Fred Tatasciore in the third video game and Rise of the Dark Spark) is Optimus Prime's arch-enemy, the malicious and tyrannical leader of the Decepticons and the main antagonist of the Transformers film series (serving as the main antagonist of the first, the second, the third and the fifth movies and a major antagonist in the fourth movie).

Millennia before the films, Megatron crash-landed on Earth in the Arctic in his quest to obtain the AllSpark. When he is defrosted, he keeps his original alien jet form out of vanity. During the final battle in Mission City, Megatron kills Jazz and duels Optimus Prime. After being weakened by human fighter jets, Megatron is killed by Sam, who pushes the AllSpark into his spark core. Later, Megatron's body is dumped into the deepest part of the Laurentian Abyss.

Megatron returns in Revenge of the Fallen. Megatron is resurrected by Scalpel and the Constructicons with a shard of the AllSpark. Upon being revived, Megatron gains a new alternative mode as a Cybertronian flying tank. He kills Optimus Prime and both he and Soundwave hijack the Earth's telecommunications systems, allowing the Fallen to send a message that Sam be handed over to him. In Egypt, Megatron fights a resurrected Optimus, but is overpowered and badly damaged, losing the right side of his face and his right arm in the process. He watches as the Fallen is destroyed, and retreats with Starscream, swearing revenge.

In Dark of the Moon, with his right arm and his half face repaired, Megatron goes into hiding in Tanzania, and takes the form of a Mack Titan 10-wheeler tanker truck. Megatron makes a secret deal with former Autobot leader Sentinel Prime to invade the Earth with an army using Space Bridge pillars and use humanity to rebuild their damaged planet together. Megatron is betrayed by Sentinel and has command of the Decepticons taken from him. During the battle in Chicago, Carly goads Megatron back into action, and he ambushes and cripples Sentinel. When Cybertron's trip through the Space Bridge fails, Megatron attempts to make a false truce with Optimus, but the latter sees through the ruse and attacks Megatron before he could shoot Optimus, tearing off Megatron's head with an Energon axe before using his fusion shotgun to kill Sentinel.

In Age of Extinction, Megatron's head is seen at KSI where Brains discovers that Megatron's mind is still alive and in a deep stasis. Megatron silently manipulates Joshua Joyce and his creation of the artificial Transformers as part of his consciousness gets placed into Galvatron.

In The Last Knight, Galvatron reassumes his old identity of Megatron and searches for the talisman to find Quintessa's staff after regaining some of his Decepticons that were held captive by the TRF. In the final battle on Cybertron, he is defeated by Optimus when Optimus cuts off his right arm as he did in Revenge of the Fallen, and is kicked through a wall, sending him falling back to Earth.

==== Galvatron ====
Galvatron (voiced by Frank Welker) is a KSI drone, and a major antagonist in Transformers: Age of Extinction. Megatron silently manipulates Joshua Joyce and KSI into allowing part of his consciousness to be transferred into Galvatron who transforms into a Freightliner Argosy cab-over truck. After Optimus Prime kills Lockdown, Galvatron escapes vowing to be reborn and have his revenge.

=== The Fallen ===
The Fallen (voiced by Tony Todd in the film, James Arnold Taylor in the second video game), formerly Megatronus Prime, is the overarching antagonist of the Transformers: Revenge of the Fallen movie. A rogue Prime of the Dynasty of Primes, the Fallen is the founder and first of the Decepticons, and Megatron's master.

In 17,000 B.C., the Fallen and his brothers set out into the universe, seeking distant suns to harvest to create Energon by building Star Harvesters. In defiance of the Primes' rule, Never destroy a planet with life, the Fallen sets about building a Star Harvester on Earth, which would destroy both the planet and its sun. To do this, he steals the Matrix of Leadership – the only thing that can turn on such a machine – but his brothers stop him, retrieve the Matrix, and hide it from him. Years after his betrayal, he is found on the Nemesis, which had crash-landed on one of Saturn's moons, in suspended animation. He can open Space Bridges at will and has telekinesis, powers that are restricted to the original Dynasty of Primes. He wields a void scepter as a melee weapon. In the film, the Fallen seeks to invade the Earth with an army of Decepticons and activate the Star Harvester for an alternative Energon source, as well as get revenge on humanity and the Autobots. He lands on Earth and uses the Earth's telecommunications grid (being hijacked by Megatron and Soundwave) to force the humans to hand over Sam Witwicky to guide the Decepticons to the Matrix of Leadership. In the final battle, the Fallen steals the Matrix from a revived Optimus Prime and starts up the Star Harvester. As the Star Harvester charges, Jetfire sacrifices himself to let Optimus use his components. After Ratchet and Jolt fuse Optimus with Jetfire's weaponry, Optimus Prime destroys the Star Harvester and the Fallen is killed by Optimus Prime who tears off his face (which reveals his skull) and crushes his spark.

=== Starscream ===
Starscream (voiced by Charlie Adler in the films and the second video game, Daniel Ross in Transformers: The Game, Steve Blum in the third video game, Sam Riegel in Rise of the Dark Spark) is Megatron's cowardly and self-serving apprentice and second-in-command who transforms into a Lockheed Martin F-22 Raptor jet, and the secondary antagonist of the Transformers franchise (serving as the secondary antagonist of the first movie, and a major antagonist in the second and third movie).

In the first film, Starscream is seen lying in wait in an air base until he receives news from Frenzy about the AllSpark. He immediately orders the rest of the Decepticons to mobilize and head towards Hoover Dam, and is the first one to arrive. He begins by attacking the power lines of the Dam, speeding Megatron's thawing and encounters him later. Megatron is disappointed to learn that the AllSpark is with the humans and berates his lieutenant for his failure, while ordering him to retrieve it. He briefly assists the Decepticons' efforts in Mission City and would retreat when Megatron is killed. In Revenge of the Fallen, Starscream oversees Megatron's return but is berated for attempting to take command. He and the Fallen are worried about the Decepticon hatchlings, who are dying without Energon. Starscream would try to assist Megatron in his fight against Optimus Prime, but his arm is cut off. Megatron berates Starscream for failing to find Sam as he attempts to fix his arm. He is then seen attacking the Autobots and the humans as they head towards Egypt. He informs Megatron when Optimus' body is brought back and later takes part in the attack with the other Decepticon forces. After the Fallen's demise, a grievously wounded Megatron flees with Starscream, not before vowing vengeance. In Dark of the Moon, Starscream is killed by Sam Witwicky who blows his head apart with one of Que's boomsticks. In The Last Knight, his head is in Daytrader's possession, who claims he found it in Buffalo, New York. Later it is seen being held by Megatron reminiscing about him. Starscream in his G1 design appears in a cameo in Bumblebee attacking the Autobots during their evacuation of Cybertron.

=== Blackout ===
Blackout (voiced by Noah Nelson in Transformers: The Game) is a first-strike Decepticon and the first Transformer seen who transforms into a Sikorsky MH-53J Pave Low III helicopter. Blackout is extremely loyal to Megatron. He leads an assault at a SOCCENT base in Qatar, killing many of its occupants; he is later killed when Lennox fires sabot rounds into his leg while he is strafed by F-22s.

==== Scorponok ====
Scorponok is a Decepticon mechanical scorpion and a minion of Blackout, attached to his back. After being damaged by gunships and losing his tail, Scorponok retreats beneath the sand.

In Revenge of the Fallen, Scorponok returns, where he wounds Jetfire, but Jetfire crushes his head and kills him.

In Rise of the Beasts, he appears as a scorpion soldier of the Predacons.

=== Barricade ===
Barricade (voiced by Jess Harnell in the 2007 film and The Last Knight, Keith David in Transformers: The Game, Frank Welker in Dark of the Moon) is a autobot scout who transforms into a black 2007 Saleen S281E police car, whom Frenzy guides to Sam. He is shown as Bumblebee's rival. In Dark of the Moon, he appears in the Battle of Chicago last seen being shot in the head by a group of soldiers after a boom-stick blew off one of his legs. Barricade unexpectedly returns in The Last Knight, transforming into a 2016 Ford Mustang Police Interceptor.

==== Frenzy ====
Frenzy (voiced by Reno Wilson) is a small Decepticon spy and a minion of Barricade who transforms into a silver PGX Boombox and later in his head mode, a black Nokia 8800 without his body. When attacking a group of humans in the control rooms, Frenzy accidentally kills himself when one of his own disc blades goes full circle and slices his head in two.

In Revenge of the Fallen, Frenzy's head is seen in the basement of Simmons' mother's deli.

=== Bonecrusher ===
Bonecrusher (voiced by Jimmie Wood) is a Decepticon who transforms into a Buffalo H Mine-Protected vehicle with a larger claw. When battling Optimus on the highway to Mission City, he is killed by Optimus.

=== Brawl ===
Brawl (Note: Is also referred to as "Devastator" in a scene in the first movie.) (voiced by David Sobolov in Transformers: The Game) is a Decepticon demolition specialist who transforms into a modified army green M1A1 Abrams with a mine plow, external spare fuel canisters, and small sub-turret with anti-air cannons and rocket launchers mounted on top of the main turret. During the battle in Mission City, he loses his left arm by means of Ratchet's buzzsaw. While firing at soldiers, he is killed by Bumblebee.

In Dark of the Moon, a recolor of Brawl appears during the battle of Chicago sequence; it would be destroyed by Optimus flying on his way to Shockwave and the Pillars.

=== Soundwave ===
Soundwave (voiced by Jon Bailey in Bumblebee, Frank Welker in the films, Peter Jessop in the second video game, Isaac C. Singleton Jr. in the third video game) is the Decepticon Communication Officer and one of Megatron's most loyal lieutenants.

In Dark of the Moon, Soundwave transforms into a silver 2011 Mercedes-Benz SLS AMG and poses as a car given to Carly by Dylan Gould. He later has his head blown off killing him by Bumblebee in the battle of Chicago.

Soundwave appears in his G1 design in a speaking cameo in Bumblebee.

==== Ravage ====
Ravage (vocal effects provided by Frank Welker) is a Decepticon infiltration expert and Soundwave's minion that resembles a large one-eyed jaguar. He is de-spined by Bumblebee in Egypt.

Ravage appears in his G1 design in a cameo in Bumblebee.

==== Laserbeak ====
Laserbeak (voiced by Keith Szarabajka) is a Decepticon infiltration expert and Soundwave's minion that resembles a mechanical condor. Like Ravage, Laserbeak serves as a spy for the Decepticons, and transforms into a variety of electronic devices and a pink version of Bumblebee. He is killed on a Decepticon ship piloted by Bumblebee during the Battle of Chicago.

=== Shockwave ===
Shockwave (voiced by Jon Bailey in Bumblebee, Frank Welker in Dark of the Moon, Daniel Riordan in Transformers: The Game, Steve Blum in Rise of the Dark Spark, Isaac C. Singleton Jr. in the Wii and Nintendo 3DS version of Rise of the Dark Spark) is an emotionless cycloptic Decepticon assassin and scientist. who transforms into a Cybertronian tank. He is killed in the Battle of Chicago by Optimus. Like Scorponok, Shockwave doesn't transform in the film.

Shockwave in his G1 design appears in a speaking cameo in Bumblebee.

Visual effects supervisor Scott Farrar said that the lack of eyes and mouth in Shockwave's design means "you have to read Shockwave through just the emotions of his face, almost like a silent-era film star," which caused the eye to have an intrinsic design, with a lens, a moving iris and an oscillating light.

=== Shatter ===
Shatter (voiced by Angela Bassett) is one of the two main antagonists of the Bumblebee movie. A female Decepticon Triple Changer who transforms into a 1971 Plymouth GTX and a Harrier jump jet. She first appears in Bumblebee where she and Dropkick arrive on Earth and trick Sector 7 into helping them hunt Bumblebee. She is later killed by Bumblebee when he destroys a dam and her brain is destroyed in a collision between a large ship and a wall

=== Dropkick ===
Dropkick (voiced by Justin Theroux) is one of the two main antagonists of the Bumblebee movie. A male Decepticon Triple Changer and Shatter's partner transforms into a blue and black 1973 AMC Javelin muscle car and a Bell AH-1 SuperCobra attack helicopter. He appears in Bumblebee where he and Shatter arrive on Earth and trick Sector 7 into helping them find Bumblebee. Dropkick is killed when Bumblebee tosses a chain into the blades of his aircraft form.

=== Blitzwing ===
Blitzwing (voiced by David Sobolov) is a Decepticon Seeker who transforms into a red and white McDonnell Douglas F-4 Phantom II. He appears in Bumblebee where he ambushes Bumblebee while he was fleeing from Sector 7 and damages his voice box and his memory core. Blitzwing is later killed by Bumblebee.

=== Constructicons ===
The Constructicons are a Decepticon sub-faction that transforms into construction vehicles in Revenge of the Fallen.

==== Devastator ====
Devastator (vocal effects provided by Frank Welker in the film, Fred Tatasciore in the video game) is a 108-foot (33 m) tall robot formed by several combining construction vehicles, who walks in a four-legged fashion resembling a gorilla. He is physically unable to stand up straight. He is destroyed by a prototype railgun during the battle in Egypt. The 8 combined vehicles of Devastator are the look-alikes of Mixmaster, Scavenger, Scrapper, Hightower, Scrapmetal, Overload, Long Haul, and Skipjack.

==== Demolishor ====
Demolishor (voiced by Calvin Wimmer in the film, Fred Tatasciore in the video game) is a large Constructicon that transforms into a white with red stripes Terex O&K RH 400 hydraulic mining excavator. He is killed when Optimus Prime shoots him in the right eye at point blank range. Demolishor is a stand-in for the upper body of Devastator.

==== Rampage ====
Rampage (voiced by Kevin Michael Richardson) is a Constructicon who transforms into a red Caterpillar D10N Bulldozer. A yellow variant of him joins the other Constructicons where he serves as Devastator's left leg. But was then killed by Bumblebee during the battle in Egypt.

==== Mixmaster ====
Mixmaster (voiced by Daniel Ross in Transformers: The Game, Dave Boat in the third video game) is a Constructicon who transforms into a black and silver Mack concrete mixer truck. He is briefly seen to have a third "battle mode" which appears to be a gun emplacement. According to his toy bio, he is an expert in chemistry and explosives who makes explosives and poisons for the other Decepticons' weapons. Some of the concept art shows him as a McNeilus mixer truck. He is killed by Jetfire. His copy forms the head of Devastator.

==== Long Haul ====
Long Haul (voiced by Neil Kaplan in the video game) is a Constructicon who transforms into a green Caterpillar 773B dump truck. Long Haul is armed with rocket launchers. Long Haul's robot mode was designed by freelance artist Josh Nizzi as fan art of the original character, by the time Revenge of the Fallen had just been greenlit. The fan art impressed Bay enough to hire him on to the film. He is killed during an air strike in the battle of Egypt. Although in the movie Long Haul's alt mode is a Caterpillar 773B, a relatively small truck, Nizzi had originally meant Long Haul to be a Caterpillar 797. In Dark of the Moon, Long Haul is reused in the battle of Chicago before it is destroyed by Optimus. He forms the right leg of Devastator. Long Haul's weapons are rockets that are placed on the top of both his hands.

==== Scrapper ====
Scrapper is a Constructicon who transforms into a yellow Caterpillar 992C scoop loader. He is killed during an air strike in the battle of Egypt. His copy forms the right arm of Devastator. In Dark of the Moon, Scrapper's character model is reused for the film in the battle of Chicago before it is destroyed by Optimus.

==== Scavenger ====
Scavenger is a large Constructicon. He appears in the final battle of Egypt, where he and the Constructicons form Devastator, but is killed by a prototype railgun. He forms the upper body of Devastator.

==== Overload ====
Overload is a Constructicon who transforms into a red Komatsu HD465-7 Tractor Truck articulated dump truck. He appears in the final battle of Egypt, where he and the Constructicons form Devastator, but is killed by a prototype railgun. He forms the lower waist of Devastator.

==== Hightower ====
Hightower is a Constructicon who transforms into a yellow KOBELCO CK2500 II crawler crane. He is only seen in vehicle mode. He appears in the final battle of Egypt, where he and the Constructicons form Devastator, but is killed by a prototype railgun. He forms the left arm of Devastator.

==== Scrapmetal ====
Scrapmetal is a Constructicon who transforms into a yellow Volvo EC700C crawler excavator fitted with a Stanley UP 45SV attachment. He joins Mixmaster, Long Haul, and Rampage on the retrieval mission to recover Megatron. He is ripped apart by his allies to provide components for Megatron. A copy of Scrapmetal forms the left hand of Devastator.

=== Dreads ===
The Dreads are a group of Decepticons who transform into a black 2007 Chevrolet Suburban emergency vehicles. They attack Sam, Bumblebee, Sideswipe, and Mirage on the highway, and later fight Ironhide and Sideswipe.

==== Crankcase ====
Crankcase is the leader of the Dreads who specializes in stealing information. He is killed by Ironhide and Sideswipe.

==== Crowbar ====
Crowbar (voiced by Jimmie Wood) is the Dreads' second-in-command that specializes in entering secured areas and systems. Crowbar is armed with Cybertronian guns. He is shot in the face by Ironhide.

==== Hatchet ====
Hatchet is the Dreads' dog-like hunting Dread. He is killed by Bumblebee and Mirage on the highway.

=== Other Decepticons ===
- Reedman (voiced by Frank Welker) is a one-eyed razor-thin robot. Reedman appears when Ravage deploys a load of marble-sized "microcons" that join to form Reedman. Reedman's extremely thin frame serves him as his main ability, by making him virtually invisible as long as he is facing directly at his enemy.
- Sideways (voiced by John DiMaggio in the video game) is a Decepticon surveillance agent. His only appearance is in Revenge of the Fallen, where transforms into a silver 2009 Audi R8. He hides with Demolishor in Shanghai until he is discovered by the Autobots. After getting chased by Arcee, Chromia and Elita-One, he is killed in vehicle mode by Sideswipe when the latter sliced him in half . In Dark of the Moon, Sideways' character model is reused for an unnamed Decepticon in the battle of Chicago before it was destroyed by Optimus.
- Scalpel (voiced by John Di Crosta) is a small spider-like medic and scientist, also known as the Doctor, equipped with a mini-saw and tools who transforms into a lensmeter. He is used to extract information from Sam and is presumed killed offscreen by Optimus Prime. In Dark of the Moon, similar looking Deceptions are seen crawling over and repairing Megatron's still-damaged head.
- Alice (portrayed by Isabel Lucas) is an undercover Decepticon Pretender who intercepts Sam in college. She has a retractable long tongue and a retractable long spiked tail. Alice is killed by Mikaela.
- Grindor (voiced by Frank Welker in the film, Fred Tatasciore in the video game) is a Decepticon warrior who transforms into a Sikorsky CH-53E Super Stallion helicopter and bears a model similar to Blackout. His head is ripped apart by Optimus Prime in Revenge of the Fallen. Before his death, the Autobot leader cuts his right side blades in half, slices off his right arm to send it flying, slashes him on the left side of his chest, uses one of Starscream's rockets to destroy his main rotor, and throws one of his swords into his right leg.
- The Insecticon is a small beetle-like Decepticon. In Revenge of the Fallen, during the final battle of Egypt, an Insecticon searches for Sam before being deactivated by him. In Age of Extinction, the Insecticons assist Brains in corrupting KSI's Galvatron with Megatron's consciousness.
- Decepticon Protoforms are various Decepticons who make up an army that appeared in each film sequel's climaxes. In Dark of the Moon, they ride Cybertronian starfighters that can transform into Cybertronian hovercraft and several large ships.
- Hatchlings are newborn Decepticons. In Revenge of the Fallen, they transform into Eggs. They are seen on board the Nemesis but die due to a leak of Energon. The Hatchlings later appeared in Dark of the Moon as Megatron's pets.
- The Driller is Shockwave's pet. It is a giant, tentacled Mongolian death worm-like Cybertronian creature that is used for drilling. The Driller appears tries to invade the engine part of the Ark, but Optimus stops it and it retreats. Later in the Battle of Chicago, Shockwave commands the Driller to tear down a large building, but it is decapitated and killed by Optimus Prime.
- Igor (voiced by Greg Berg) is a deformed Decepticon that scurries about Megatron at his base in Africa. He is modeled after the head of Long Haul.
- Loader is a Decepticon who made a cameo and is killed offscreen in the battle of Chicago.
- Devcon is a quadrupedal Decepticon in Chicago in Dark of the Moon. He is killed by the combined firepower of the Wreckers and NEST soldiers.
- The Watch-bot is a small centipede-like Decepticon spy who transforms into a wristwatch in Dark of the Moon. It was used by Dylan to place it on Sam before it was killed by Sam when the Autobots were assumed dead in the shuttle explosion.
- Mohawk (voiced by Reno Wilson) is a small, talkative, insane and loyal Decepticon footsoldier who transforms into a Confederate P51 Combat Fighter. His TRF description states that he is IN CUSTODY and that he is skilled with knives. Despite the fact that his alt mode is a relatively small motorcycle, his TRF description also states that Mohawk is 14 feet tall in robot mode. Mohawk is left behind after the Decepticons retreat from Cade and the Autobots before having his body destroyed by Bumblebee. He is still alive as his spark is located in his head instead of his chest due to his small body.
- Dreadbot is a feral Decepticon thug who shares the same body as Crowbar and transforms into a rusty 1955 Volkswagen Type 2 with Christmas lights in his right arm. His TRF description states that he is "IN CUSTODY". He is killed and eaten by Grimlock.
- Nitro Zeus (voiced by John DiMaggio) is a showboating Decepticon hunter who transforms into a JAS-39 Gripen Fighter Jet. His TRF description states that he is "IN CUSTODY". Nitro is later killed after having his head blown off by Bumblebee.
- Berserker is a Decepticon commando who makes a cameo in The Last Knight. His TRF description states that he is "TO BE RELEASED UNDER NO CIRCUMSTANCES" and that he is a homicidal sociopath. He is selected by Megatron in a deal with TRF, but they refused claiming that Berserker is too dangerous to be released and he does not have enough Energon. So Megatron selects Onslaught instead.
- Onslaught (voiced by Travis Willingham in Rise of the Dark Spark) is a large Decepticon tactician and Megatron's battlefield lieutenant who transforms into a Western Star 4900 SF tow truck. His TRF description states that he is "IN CUSTODY". He is selected by Megatron after refusing to release Berserker. He dies after losing his right leg and head to Drift.
- The Seekers (voiced by Kirk Baily) are Decepticon foot soldiers that transform into Cybertronian jets. Shockwave orders them to destroy the launchpad to prevent the Autobots from escaping Cybertron. The Studio Series toyline reveals that these Seekers are Thrust, Thundercracker and Skywarp.

== KSI Drones ==
The KSI Drones are the human-made Transformers that were commissioned by Attinger and built by KSI. They can change their forms on a molecular level, and are built with the metal extracted from the remains of dead Transformers. They were originally mindless drones remote-controlled by humans, but are granted autonomy by Galvatron, organizing them into a new Decepticon army. They fight in the battle of Hong Kong, but are destroyed by the Autobots, Cade Yeager, and the Dinobots.

- Stinger is a KSI prototype modeled after Bumblebee, who later becomes a Decepticon and transforms into a red and black 2013 Pagani Huayra. He has his head blown off by Bumblebee and is eaten by Strafe.
- Junkheap is a KSI prototype that becomes a Decepticon and transforms into a green Mack TerraPro garbage truck of Waste Management, Inc. He can split at will into three different drones that share the same single consciousness, which are killed by Hound.

=== KSI Sentries ===
The KSI Sentries are KSI prototypes modeled after Roadbuster and transform into multiple different colored Chevrolet Traxes. Many are killed by the Autobots and Dinobots.

- Two Heads are the two-headed KSI prototypes modeled after Shockwave and transforms into a Chevrolet Trax, who become Decepticons. They are killed by Hound and Optimus.
- The KSI Boss is a KSI prototype that is modeled after Barricade and transforms into a Dodge Caravan. He is killed by the Autobots and Dinobots.
- The Aston Martin Decepticon is a KSI prototype who transforms into a white Aston Martin DBS V12. It was killed by the Autobots.
- KSI Widow is a female KSI prototype who transforms into an orange McLaren MP4-12C. She is killed by the Autobots.

== Terrorcons ==
The Terrorcons are heralds of Unicron appearing in Transformers: Rise of the Beasts.

=== Scourge ===
Scourge (voiced by Peter Dinklage) is the main antagonist of the Transformers: Rise of the Beasts movie, the ruthless leader of the Terrorcons and Cybertronian trophy hunter who transforms into a black Peterbilt 359 semi-trailer truck (similar to the one from Mad Max) and Unicron's servant. Scourge managed to track down the Transwarp Key to the Cybertronian colony planet Animatron(AKA Animatros, the Jungle Planet, and Eukaris) and came face-to-face with the Maximal Apelinq. After a brief scuffle with Apelinq, Scourge fatally wounded him, but was too late to stop other Maximals, including Optimus Primal, Rhinox, Cheetor, and Airazor, from escaping the planet with the Transwarp Key before Unicron arrived and destroyed their homeworld. After being reprimanded by his dark master for letting the Maximals get away with the Transwarp Key, Scourge vowed to search the entire universe for the key.

In 1994, Scourge lands on Earth, alongside 2 fellow Terrorcons, Nightbird and Battletrap, after having detected the Transwarp Key's energy signature from a museum in Brooklyn, New York. Upon arriving at the museum, Scourge sends two of his Sweeps to retrieve the key from two humans: Noah Diaz and Elena Wallace. Soon enough, the Autobots, led by Optimus Prime, arrive on the scene and a grueling battle ensues, with the Terrorcons proving resistant to damage due to being infused with Unicron's dark energy. Scourge managed to overpower Optimus and deactivate Bumblebee before taking the latter's Autobot insignia off as a trophy. The Terrorcons took the Transwarp Key just before the Maximal Warrior Airazor arrives and drives them off with her fire breath.

The Terrorcons followed the Autobots to the other half of the key's location and Scourge once again sends his Freezers to retrieve it from the humans. A chase scene ensues, with Scourge tackling Optimus Prime off a cliff, while Battletrap and Nightbird pursue the other Autobots. Though the Terrorcons end up retreating again due to Airazor's interference, Scourge managed to corrupt her by using Unicron's dark energy. When Noah, Elena, Airazor and the Autobots regroup with the other Maximals, now led by Optimus Primal, the dark energy begins to corrupt Airazor, resulting in her kidnapping Elena and delivering the other half of the key to Scourge.

Meanwhile, Scourge reassembles the key on top of a volcano and uses it to open a portal above Earth that Unicron can pass through. Soon after, the Autobots and Maximals join forces to defeat the Terrorcons while Noah and Elena sneak toward the Transwarp Key to deactivate it. Though Nightbird and Battletrap die in the battle, Scourge manages to gravely wound the Autobot Mirage. Despite his injuries, the young Autobot transforms the remains of his body into an exo-suit for Noah to assist Optimus in his fight with Scourge. During the fight, Scourge destroys the control console, meaning the portal cannot be closed. Scourge is killed by an enraged Optimus Prime, by slicing off both of his arms and ripping his head and spinal cord from him during the final fight.

=== Nightbird ===
Nightbird (voiced by Michaela Jaé Rodriguez) is one of two secondary antagonists of the Transformers: Rise of the Beasts movie, and a Terrorcon ninja and Scourge's second-in-command, who transforms into a customized 1995 Nissan Skyline GT-R R33. She is killed by Bumblebee, who rips one of her wings off and jams it into her spark mid-flight. The resulting explosion reduced her to nothing more than a shower of broken parts, the only ones left intact being her swords.

=== Battletrap ===
Battletrap (voiced by David Sobolov) is one of two secondary antagonists of the Transformers: Rise of the Beasts movie, and a Terrorcon commando who transforms into an orange 1980s GMC TopKick C7000 tow truck. In the final battle, bargaining for a real fight, he is dismembered (severed arm and leg) by Optimus Prime and killed by Optimus Primal (caused by a blow from his own flail).

=== Sweeps ===
Sweeps are a group of spider-like Terrorcons two built into his body, identified in promotional material as Freezer and Novakane. Two are primarily seen in the movie deployed by Scourge; one tracked down Noah and Elena in the Peruvian cave, and the other attacked Elena after Mirage, covering fire for Noah, was deactivated. In the Rise of the Beasts toyline, the Sweeps could transform into a weapon artillery for Scourge and his fellow Terrorcons to wield.

== Humans ==
There are different human characters that appear in the film series where some of them either support the Autobots or play other roles. There are also a few human villains that the Autobots also face off against.

=== Sam Witwicky ===
Samuel James "Sam" "Spike" Witwicky (portrayed by Shia LaBeouf) appears as the main human protagonist of the first three movies of the Transformers film series.

In the film series, he is known to be the son of both Ronald Witwicky and Judith Taylor, the grandson of Herbert Witwicky, the great-grandson of Clarence Witwicky and the great-great–grandson of Archibald Witwicky.

=== William Lennox ===
William Lennox (portrayed by Josh Duhamel in the films, voiced by John DiMaggio in the Revenge of the Fallen video game) is a good and dedicated, persevered Army Rangers officer and later a member of NEST aiding the Autobots. In the first film, he and his crew return to a SOCCENT base in Qatar after going on a mission behind enemy lines. His base is destroyed by Blackout, forcing him and the rest of the squad to flee. They are intercepted by Scorponok, but they manage to damage him with the help of aerial reinforcements and capture his tail. Upon returning to the US, they are brought to Hoover Dam, where they are shown a frozen Megatron. He and his team threaten Agent Simmons and the rest of the Sector 7 special agents when Simmons refuses to release Bumblebee. During the climactic battle in Mission City, he fights alongside the Autobots to protect Sam and keep the Decepticons from getting the Allspark, and kills Blackout.

In the second film, Lennox is a US Army Major and serves as the field commander of NEST and is promoted to Lieutenant Colonel by the third film.

After NEST is dissolved following the Battle of Chicago, Lennox is recruited to join the TRF, which hunts both Earthbound Decepticons and Earthbound Autobots. Lennox remains sympathetic to the Autobots and joins them in the final battle.

=== Mikaela Banes ===
Mikaela Banes (portrayed by Megan Fox) is a skilled mechanic who inherited mechanical skills from her father, Cal, a grease monkey and paroled car thief. She is Sam's classmate who later becomes his first girlfriend.

In the third film, she is mentioned to have broken up with Sam for unknown reasons.

=== Carly Spencer ===
Carly Spencer (portrayed by Rosie Huntington-Whiteley) is Sam's second girlfriend, based on the character Carly from the original The Transformers cartoon.

Critics were highly critical of Huntington-Whiteley and LaBeouf's acting; Peter Travers stated the two "couldn't be duller".

Jason Solomons of The Observer wrote that "we're first introduced to Rosie via a close-up of her bum, segueing straight from the film's opening sequence and titles on to the pert buttocks and underwear of our heroine", and that Huntington-Whiteley's English posh girl accent "renders her practically unintelligible when surrounded by American accents and falling masonry". Much of the criticism towards Huntington-Whiteley compared her negatively to Fox. Cody Benjamin of Intelligencer Journal found Rosie Huntington-Whiteley a "visually attractive replacement for Megan Fox and [she] does a decent job playing Witwicky's new girlfriend".

In a positive review, Drew McWeeny of HitFix said, "She reminds me of Cameron Diaz in The Mask, an actress who doesn't really show off any range, but who gives a natural, winning performance and who is up to the challenge of this particular picture."

=== Seymour Simmons ===
Agent Seymour Rutherford Simmons (portrayed by Nick Pilla in Bumblebee, John Turturro in the other films) is a former arrogant and paranoid Sector 7 special agent, the son of Bill Simmons, grandson of Margaret Simmons and the great-grandson of Walter Simmons, Sam's unlikely enemy-turned-ally in the second and third films, and the last surviving member of the Order of the Witwiccans.

In Bumblebee, a younger Simmons works with Jack Burns when they are tricked by 2 Decepticons, Shatter and Dropkick, into helping them to find Bumblebee.

=== Robert Epps ===
Robert Epps (portrayed by Tyrese Gibson in the films, voiced by Avery Kidd Waddell in the Revenge of the Fallen video game) is a United States Air Force Combat Controller Technical sergeant and a friend of Lennox. In the third film, he has retired from the Air Force but still works closely with the Autobots.

=== Cade Yeager ===
Cade Yeager (portrayed by Mark Wahlberg) is a single father and an inventor who builds robots for money for his daughter, Tessa, to keep her safe after he made a promise to his wife before she died. He first appeared in Transformers: Age of Extinction as the main human protagonist, where Cade found a rusty truck which is revealed to be none other than Optimus Prime, who had been hiding.

Cade returns in Transformers: The Last Knight as the main human protagonist, where Edmund revealed that Cade is "the last Knight" when the Talisman chooses him.

=== Viviane Wembly ===
Viviane Wembly (portrayed by Laura Haddock as an adult, Minti Gorne as a young girl) is a professor of English literature at the University of Oxford and the last descendant of Merlin. She is kidnapped by Hot Rod until she meets Sir Edmund, Cade, Bee, and Cogman. She learns that her father had first met Hot Rod with a book of Merlin and the Staff. She is the one who claims the Staff of Merlin, and saves Earth and Cybertron from colliding with each other.

=== Izabella Yeager ===
Izabella Yeager (portrayed by Isabela Merced; credited as Isabela Moner) is a street-smart tomboy who grew up an orphan after she survived the battle of Chicago and becomes friends with Sqweeks and Canopy. Her parents were killed by an unnamed Decepticon when their building was shot in the events of Transformers: Dark of the Moon. After the death of Canopy, Izabella became Cade's adoptive daughter and lived with him in the scrapyard.

=== Charlie Watson ===
Charlie Watson (portrayed by Hailee Steinfeld) is a teenage girl who works at an amusement park hot dog stand in Bumblebee. During her early life, Charlie was part of a champion swim team, but quit after her father's untimely death. She becomes friends with Bumblebee, who has lost his voice and memory after arriving on Earth. She is drawn into the Cybertron skirmish when Dropkick and Shatter track down Bumblebee on Earth, and helps stop them from revealing the location of Optimus Prime to the Decepticons. She realizes that Bumblebee has a greater purpose on Earth and they part ways. In the final scene, Charlie finishes fixing the car that she and her father were working on.

=== Noah Díaz ===
Noah Díaz (portrayed by Anthony Ramos) is an ex-military electronics expert who lives with his family in Brooklyn, trying to support them. After aiding the Autobots and Maximals in saving Earth from Terrorcons and Unicron, Noah is invited by Agent Burke for a seemingly normal security job, only to learn that Burke is actually recruiting him to G.I. Joe.

=== Elena Wallace ===
Elena Wallace (portrayed by Dominique Fishback) is an African-American artifact researcher and an intern at a museum whose boss keeps taking credit for her work. Despite some reluctance, her courage and compassion pushes her to join the Autobots in their search for the Key, and helps them and the Maximals to save Earth from Unicron. She gains credit for the Peruvian temple she found under Cusco.

== Order of the Witwiccans ==
The Order of the Witwiccans is a group of the descendants of Merlin who know the presences and secret histories of Transformers on Earth that was founded in 484 AD. Most of its known figures that became members of this group include famous people throughout history. Their motto is "No sacrifice, No victory".

- Sir Edmund Burton, the 12th Earl of Folgan (portrayed by Anthony Hopkins) is a historian, an eccentric member of the Order of the Witwiccans, and an astronomer. He knows Bumblebee from when he was a child. Burton has a portrait of every known member of the Order of the Witwiccans in his castle that consists of historical figures. He and Simmons learn the secrets of Cybertron and Unicron. Burton is killed by Megatron when trying to stop him from rebuilding Cybertron with Quintessa.
- Captain Archibald Witwicky (portrayed by W. Morgan Sheppard) is the great-grandfather of Ron, the great-great-grandfather of Sam, and a member of the Order of the Witwiccans. Archibald is a sea captain leading an exploration of the Arctic in 1897 when his dogs find a frozen Megatron beneath the ice. He accidentally activates Megatron's inertial navigation system that leads to a sudden power surge. The discharge etches a digital map to the AllSpark onto the lenses of his glasses. These were passed down over time and eventually given to Sam.
- King Arthur (portrayed by Liam Garrigan) is the legendary British King of Camelot during The Dark Ages in The Last Knight. Garrigan previously portrayed a version of King Arthur in Once Upon a Time.
- Merlin (portrayed by Stanley Tucci) is Arthur's wizard who formerly used his Staff, given by Stormreign, to aid Arthur against the Saxons. When the staff extracts her DNA, it is revealed that Viviane's is his last descendant to protect his Staff from Quintessa.
- The Knights of the Round Table – The Knights of the Round Table are King Arthur's elite warriors.
  - Lancelot (portrayed by Martin McCreadie) – Member of the Knights of the Round Table.
  - Gawain (portrayed by Marcus Fraser) – Member of the Knights of the Round Table.
  - Tristan (portrayed by John Hollingworth) – Member of the Knights of the Round Table.
  - Percival (portrayed by Rob Witcomb) – Member of the Knights of the Round Table.
  - Moriaen – Member of the Knights of the Round Table.

The following are historical figures that are mentioned to be members of this group:

- Ludwig van Beethoven – A German composer and pianist.
- Giotto di Bondone – An Italian painter and architect from Florence during the Middle Ages.
- Catherine the Great – An empress from Russia from 1762 to 1796.
- Winston Churchill – The Prime Minister of Great Britain.
- Nicolaus Copernicus – A famed mathematician and astronomer who formulated a model of the universe that placed the Sun rather than the Earth at the center of the universe.
- Charles Darwin – An English naturalist, geologist, and biologist.
- Frederick Douglass – An African-American social reformer, abolitionist, orator, writer, and statesman.
- Albert Einstein – A physicist who developed the theory of relativity.
- Queen Elizabeth I – The Queen of England from 1558 until her death on 24 March 1603.
- Galileo Galilei – An Italian polymath who is known for astronomical innovations.
- Stephen Hawking – A paralyzed physicist, cosmologist, and author.
- King Henry V – The King of England from 1413 until his death at the age of 36 in 1422.
- Edmund Hillary – A New Zealand mountaineer, explorer, and philanthropist who became one of the first people to reach the top of Mount Everest.
- Antoine Lavoisier – A French nobleman and chemist.
- Abraham Lincoln – The 16th President of the United States.
- Gustav Mahler – An Austro-Bohemian late-Romantic composer and one of the leading conductors of his generation.
- Michelangelo – An Italian sculptor, painter, architect, and poet of the High Renaissance.
- Wolfgang Amadeus Mozart – A prodigal Austrian composer and pianist.
- Isaac Newton – An English mathematician, astronomer, theologian, author and physicist.
- Theodore Roosevelt – The 26th President of the United States.
- William Shakespeare – An English poet, playwright, and actor.
- Nikola Tesla – A Serbian-American inventor, electrical engineer, mechanical engineer, physicist, and futurist.
- Harriet Tubman – An African-American abolitionist and political activist.
- Queen Victoria – The Queen of England from 20 June 1837, until her death 2 January 1901.
- Leonardo da Vinci – A polymath, inventor, artist, sculptor, scientist, and writer of the Italian Renaissance.
- George Washington – The 1st President of the United States.
- Wright brothers – Two brothers who are the inventors of the airplane.

== Other humans ==
- Maggie Madsen & Glen Whitmann (portrayed by Rachael Taylor & Anthony Anderson) Maggie assists the Department of Defense in decoding the virus left by Frenzy. Maggie realizes that those hacking into the government's data files are not human, due to the ease with which they made the attack. After copying the hacking signal to her tech genius friend Glen Whitmann, they were arrested by the FBI. The writers had initially envisioned Maggie as quirkier and more cyberpunk. She found many of her scenes difficult because of the high heels she wore.
- Jorge "Fig" Figueroa (portrayed by Amaury Nolasco) is an ACWO operative. Fig is wounded by a rocket fired by Scorponok. In a deleted scene in the Blu-ray version of the film, Fig is seen dying after getting wounded by Scorponok, but his character remains alive in the finished film and he was offered to reprise his role in Revenge of the Fallen, which he refused due to scheduling conflicts with another project.
- Patrick Donnelly (portrayed by Zack Ward) is Fig and Lennox's friend. He is impaled and killed by Scorponok with his corpse being dragged under the sand. He was later avenged indirectly when Jetfire crushes Scorponok's head.
- Bobby Bolivia (portrayed by Bernie Mac) is a used car salesman from whom Sam purchases Bumblebee. Although he does not appear in Bumblebee, his dialogue from the first film is heard in the first trailer.
- Theodore Galloway (portrayed by John Benjamin Hickey in the film, voiced by Bryce Johnson in the Revenge of the Fallen video game) is the cowardly and hateful American National Security Adviser who believes the Autobots' presence on Earth is the reason for the Decepticons still remaining on the planet, and a major human antagonist in the Transformers: Revenge of the Fallen movie. He develops prejudice and contempt towards the Autobots. After Megatron's return and Optimus' death, Galloway orders a shutdown on the partnership with NEST and the Autobots, have Optimus' corpse shipped to Diego Garcia, and tells Lennox and his men to stand down. During the flight to Garcia, Lennox straps him into a parachute and throws him out of the plane. He lands in an uncharted Egyptian desert, and angrily calls General Morshower to complain, who hangs up on him.
- Leo Spitz (portrayed by Ramón Rodríguez) is Sam's whiny and cowardly college roommate who owns a website on conspiracy theories called www.TheRealEffingDeal.com. Rodríguez endured 100 mph (160 km/h) winds created by electrical fans while filming in Egypt, which resulted in him dislocating his shoulder and having to spend 45 minutes having sand flushed from his eyes. At some point, the character was supposed to be called "Chuck" and Jonah Hill was considered for the role.
- Dylan Gould (portrayed by Patrick Dempsey) is the CEO of Hotchkiss Gould Investments who is a last human collaborator and secret agent for the Decepticons, and the major human antagonist of the Transformers: Dark of the Moon movie. His father first met with Soundwave and Laserbeak. In the Battle of Chicago, he is killed by Sam when he is knocked into the activated control pillar.
- Charlotte Mearing (portrayed by Frances McDormand) is the Director of National Intelligence who has a history with Agent Simmons.
- Dutch Gerhardt (portrayed by Alan Tudyk) is Agent Simmons' assistant. Dutch was once supposedly a cut-throat assassin and drug addict who was quick on the trigger, but has since put that aside to start a new, civilized life; Tudyk originated the role in the 2000 comedy-drama film 28 Days, deciding during the production of Dark of the Moon to portray Dutch as "the same guy. Not only does he kind of seem like the same guy—he’s the absolute same guy."
- Jerry "Deep" Wang (portrayed by Ken Jeong) is a paranoid software programmer and conspiracy theorist who stalks Sam at work. Jerry then gives Sam information about the moon program, assassinations, and the "Dark Side of the Moon". He is revealed to be allied with the Decepticons, but is killed by Laserbeak for giving Sam the information about the Moon's secrets.
- Dimitri (portrayed by Elya Baskin) is a former cosmonaut who was supposed to travel to the dark side of the Moon. He gives Sam, Simmons, and Dutch the information about the Moon, showing them pictures and revealing Pillars being stockpiled on the Moon.
- Alexi Voskhod (portrayed by Ravil Isyanov) is a Ukrainian government official who learns of the existence of the Ark's fuel cell in Chernobyl. He is assassinated by Laserbeak after disclosing the information to Lennox.
- Lucas Flannery (portrayed by T. J. Miller) is Cade's best friend, fellow employee and a mechanic. He tried to escape with Cade, Tessa, and Optimus, but is killed by Lockdown's grenade and turned into stone.
- Jimmy (portrayed by Jerrod Carmichael) is one of Cade's friends and his employee in The Last Knight. He is hired by a want ad by Cade and hides with him and the Autobots in a scrapyard to avoid the TRF. When TRF drones sent by Santos chase him, Cade, and Izzy, he comments that those machines were meant to hunt down terrorists instead of "tax paying Americans". He is shot by one of them allowing Cade time to destroy it, but survives as he was shot with a bean bag.
- Mr. Watson (portrayed by Tim Martin Gleason) is Charlie's father. He and Charlie used to work together restoring an old car. At some point, he died of a heart attack. Bumblebee first learns about him when he reviews his video of Charlie on a swim team.
- Sally Watson (portrayed by Pamela Adlon) is Charlie's mother.
- Otis Watson (portrayed by Jason Drucker) is Charlie's brother.
- Ron (portrayed by Stephen Schneider) is Sally's boyfriend.
- Guillermo "Memo" Gutierrez (portrayed by Jorge Lendeborg Jr.) is a love interest, nerd, and friend of Charlie who helps Charlie and Bumblebee stop the Decepticon invasion.
- Uncle Hank (portrayed by Len Cariou) is a cranky owner of Hanks Marine Repair and Parts and Charlie's uncle, who gave Charlie the derelict Beetle.
- Craig (portrayed by Kollin Holtz) is a greasy manager of the Hot Dog on a Stick on the Brighton Falls Boardwalk.
- Tina Lark (portrayed by Gracie Dzienny) is spoiled rich mean girl who's accompanied by two other mean girls and teased Charlie over her car and dead father, which prompted Memo to suggest that Charlie to get revenge in which Bumblebee agreed on. That night Tina heard loud noises outside and emerged outside to find her prized BMW was wrecked in the driveway.
- Tripp Summers (portrayed by Ricardo Hayos) is Noah's friend who knows how to impress the ladies.
- Kris Diaz (portrayed by Dean Scott Vazquez) is Noah's younger brother and Breanna's son who suffers from a chronic illness.
- Breanna Diaz (portrayed by Luna Lauren Vélez) is Noah and Kris's mother.
- Reek (portrayed by Tobe Nwigwe) is Noah's friend who talks him into grand theft auto.
- Jillian (portrayed by Sarah Stiles) is Elena's boss who keeps taking credit for her work.

== Real life characters ==
Several real world actors play themselves in the films. Several of them are credited (or uncredited) at the end of each film.

- Buzz Aldrin plays himself, who greets Optimus Prime in Dark of the Moon. Cory Tucker plays young Buzz Aldrin in the beginning of the film in 1969.
- Bill O'Reilly makes a cameo as himself interviewing Agent Simmons on his show The O'Reilly Factor in Dark of the Moon.
- General Motors Vice President of Design Edward T. Welburn makes a cameo appearance as a KSI executive in Age of Extinction.
- Director Michael Bay makes a cameo appearance in Transformers where he is flicked by Megatron. He makes another cameo in Revenge of the Fallen aboard a C-17 transport where he and his crew were seen next to Optimus Prime in truck mode. He makes a third cameo in Age of Extinction as the driver of the truck, which Optimus Prime and Bumblebee destroy during their fight against Galvatron.
- Han Geng cameos as himself singing and playing the guitar in a parked car before being magnetized by Lockdown's ship in Age of Extinction.

== Government agencies/companies ==
=== Sector 7 ===
Sector 7 is a secret American government agency that deals with extraterrestrial technology and threats in Transformers and Bumblebee. Following the fight in Mission City, Sector 7 was shut down. Besides Seymour Simmons, the following are the known members of Sector 7:

- Tom Banacheck (portrayed by Michael O'Neill) is the head of Sector 7's Advanced Research Division.
- General Whalen (portrayed by Glynn Turman) is a general that supervises Jack Burns.
- Colonel Jack Burns (portrayed by John Cena) is a colonel of Sector 7, and the secondary human antagonist and anti-hero of the Bumblebee movie. A training exercise he leads is interrupted by Bumblebee's arrival on Earth, which Burns interprets as a hostile action. Before Bumblebee can explain himself he and Burns's team are ambushed by Blitzwing, knocking Burns out and damaging Bumblebee's voice box and memory cells. Seeing Bumblebee walk away from the fight, Burns develops an intense vendetta against the Autobot, and later expresses suspicion of the Decepticons' intentions when they arrive on Earth, questioning their intentions based on their name alone. Although he spends much of the film expressing prejudice against Bumblebee and openly claiming he wants to tear him apart, he realises he'd misjudged harshly after Bumblebee saves him and helps him escape before the rest of the army arrives.

=== NEST ===
The Non-biological Extraterrestrial Species Treaty (or NEST for short) is a team of soldiers led by Lennox and Epps who help Sam in Revenge of the Fallen and Dark of the Moon. They merge with the human–Autobot alliance to fight the Decepticons. The team disbands after the Battle of Chicago, but remnants of NEST join as the TRF.

- General Morshower (portrayed by Glenn Morshower) is the leader of NEST who communicates with the squad in the Pentagon. After NEST is dissolved, he is recruited to join TRF.
- Graham (portrayed by Matthew Marsden) is an agent of the fictional SASF and a member of the British Army Special Air Service who joins NEST.
- Burke (portrayed by Brian Shehan) is a member of Lennox's eight-man team who survives Blackout's attack and later helps the Autobots at Mission City. He returns in Revenge of the Fallen as part of NEST.
- Stone (portrayed by Josh Kelly) is a former NEST member who went into retirement along with Epps in Dark of the Moon. Kelly also portrayed Stone as a Strike Force team member in Revenge of the Fallen.

=== Cemetery Wind ===
Cemetery Wind is a secret black ops unit of the CIA that works with KSI. They are asked to hunt down the Decepticons only, but without the President and their own agency's knowledge, Cemetery Wind also tries eliminating the Autobots due to Attinger's belief that all Transformers were menaces to humanity, no matter their faction. After the final battle of Hong Kong and Attinger and Savoy's deaths, Cemetery Wind is disbanded for military crimes and was replaced with the TRF after Lockdown's death.

- Harold Attinger (portrayed by Kelsey Grammer) is the main human antagonist of the Transformers: Age of Extinction movie. Harold is an ultranationalist and xenophobic corrupt CIA official who is the founder of the black ops division Cemetery Wind and an ally to Lockdown. He harbors deep hatred towards both Autobots and Decepticons, believing them to be an overall threat. Later in the battle of Hong Kong, he tries to kill Cade who he sees as a traitor only to be shot by Optimus Prime for his treason. His corpse was blown to ashes after Optimus used Lockdown's grenade to destroy the remaining KSI drones.
- James Savoy (portrayed by Titus Welliver) is a corrupt field leader of Cemetery Wind and second in-command to Attinger. He is killed by Cade Yeager, who knocks him off a building during their fight. His corpse was sucked by Lockdown's ship and devoured by his henchman when using the giant magnet.

=== TRF ===
The Transformers Reaction Force (or TRF for short) is an international paramilitary organization that seeks to eradicate all Transformers, both Autobots and Decepticons, hiding on Earth. TRF is created from the remnants of the rogue CIA unit Cemetery Wind, as well as from the remnants of military unit, NEST. They are willing to kill any allies and sympathizers among humans that the Cybertronians might have, such as Cade Yeager, Viviane Wembly, or Edmund Burton. Events cause TRF to create an alliance to the Autobots and Cade to save the Earth from Quintessa. After she is defeated, the former TRF members watch as the Autobots head to Cybertron to rebuild it and the TRF was dissolved.

- Santos (portrayed by Santiago Cabrera) is the commander of the TRF and a former Delta Force Operator and the major human antagonist and anti-hero of the Transformers: The Last Knight movie. He born in São Paulo, Brazil, and grew up in Phoenix, Arizona. He seeks to destroy all remaining Cybertronians left on Earth as he believes them to be a threat. When learning that Cade is hiding Autobots, he sets out on a mission to arrest him. He tried to kill Optimus but is injured when his shot is deflected back. However, he finally redeems himself after Cade shames him for betraying the Autobots and helps the Autobots prevent Quintessa and the Decepticons from destroying Earth. He also reveals that the HMS Alliance submarine is a female Autobot.

=== KSI ===
Kinetic Solutions Incorporated (or KSI for short) is the robotics company who works Cemetery Wind and builds the remote control Transformers in Chicago, later Beijing. After the battle in Hong Kong, KSI stops production of its remote control Transformers.

- Joshua Joyce (portrayed by Stanley Tucci) is a cynical and arrogant CEO of KSI who wants to build his own Transformers. He realizes that Megatron had been using his technology to improve himself and the other Decepticons. After Harold Attinger and Lockdown's deaths, Joshua helps Cade Yeager rebuild his farm house that was destroyed by Cemetery Wind as an act of reparation.
- Darcy Tirrell (portrayed by Sophia Myles) is a geologist assistant and Joyce's ex-girlfriend. She discovers cyber-formed dinosaurs in the Arctic, leading her to suspect that the Seed is more dangerous than Joshua is willing to admit.
- Su Yueming (苏月明; Sū Yuèmíng; portrayed by Li Bingbing) is the owner of the Chinese factory in Beijing, used by KSI to build more artificial Transformers.

=== G.I. Joe ===
- Agent Burke (portrayed by Michael Kelly) is the recruiter who recruited Noah Díaz.

== Other Cybertronians ==
- Dynasty of Primes (three of them voiced by Michael York, Kevin Michael Richardson, Robin Atkin Downes) – Six of the Seven Primes and the overarching protagonists of the Transformers film series. The Seven Primes are the first Cybertronians who travelled to distant galaxies looking for planets where they could build Star Harvesters. It was during the Dynasty's rule that Star Harvesters were not to be used in containing life. In 17,000 B.C.E., one of them defied the rule by powering up the Star Harvester, an act that ignited a war and earned him the name the Fallen. To stop the destruction of both the planet and its sun, the remaining six stole and hid the Matrix of Leadership, sacrificing themselves to make a tomb of their own bodies, sealing the Matrix away. When Sam dies, his spirit communes with the six Primes and they tell him he has earned his destiny. They resurrect Sam, who uses the Matrix of Leadership to bring Optimus back to life and kill the Fallen.
- Lockdown (voiced by Mark Ryan in the film, Gregg Berger in Rise of the Dark Spark) – A ruthless Cybertronian assassin and bounty hunter who transforms into a grey 2013 Lamborghini Aventador LP 700-4 Coupe, and the main antagonist of the Transformers: Age of Extinction movie. In Age of Extinction, Lockdown works for Quintessa to bring Optimus to a damaged Cybertron and kill any Autobots who refuse to give up his location. He also makes a deal with Attinger to kill both the remaining Autobots and Decepticons on Earth, while offering the Seed in exchange for aid in hunting Optimus. In a duel in Hong Kong, while trying to recapture Prime, Lockdown is bisected by Optimus from behind.
  - The Shadow Raiders – Lockdown's techno-organic henchmen. They use their Drone balls to detect intruders on ships. Most are killed by Cade, Shane, and Crosshairs, while the rest remain inside Lockdown's ship.
  - Steeljaws – Lockdown's techno-organic wolf-like hounds. During the Autobots' raid in the Knight Ship, while hanging on the cables, they are killed by Cade and Bumblebee.
- Unicron (voiced by Colman Domingo) – A planet-sized Chaos Bringer, a very first Cybertronian and Cybertron's ancient enemy who formed around himself as the Earth. In The Last Knight, his six horns only appeared when emerging and sensing a damaged Cybertron's approach to collide with. Unicron appeared as the overarching antagonist of the Transformers: Rise of the Beasts movie where he is depicted as a separate entity much like his G1 self-retconning his appearance in The Last Knight.
- The Creators – The overarching antagonists of the Transformers film series, are unseen mysterious pink extraterrestrial race who are the creators of all Cybertronians. 65 million B.C.E., in their ships, they invade every organic planet, using the Seeds, cyberforming the planet, ending the age of Dinosaurs to an KT extinction event on Earth. They harvest and use the resultant metal and the AllSpark to build Cybertronians. Million years later, Quintessa sends Lockdown to Earth for one task – bring Optimus to rebuild a damaged Cybertron, kill any Autobots that interfere, and wanting the Creators' "chessboard cleaned". They appear to be hostile and consider the intermingling of species to upset the cosmic balance. After Lockdown is killed, Optimus flies into space, stating that he is coming for them with the Seed.
  - Quintessa (voiced and portrayed by Gemma Chan) – A forceful, malevolent Cybertronian sorceress and the "Prime of Life" who seeks to destroy Unicron (and the Earth), and the main antagonist of the Transformers: The Last Knight movie. She originally possesses a magical staff for Cybertron till her Knights betray her, steal, and hide the staff on Earth. After Cybertron was destroyed in Dark of the Moon, she plans to destroy the Earth to rebuild her planet by draining Unicron's energy with Megatron and a formerly-brainwashed Optimus, under her spell as "Nemesis Prime", to find her staff. Originally killed by Bumblebee from behind, she secretly survived when she used Space Bridges forcing her to retreat, disguises herself as a human, and shows the humans how to kill Unicron.
    - Infernocons – Quintessa's six demonic minions who replaced her Knights and which combine into Infernocus. In the climax, they are destroyed by Optimus in one shot.
- The Knights of Iacon – Twelve Cybertronian Guardian Knights who betrayed Quintessa, took, hid her staff on Earth within their crashed ship, and later gave it to Merlin during the Dark Ages. They also combine into a giant three-headed dragon named Dragonstorm.
