= Elita One =

Transformers character

- Transformers character
- Elita One, as she appears in The Transformers
- First appearance: "The Search for Alpha Trion"
- Voiced by: Marlene Aragon, Scarlett Johansson, others

In-universe information
- Race: Cybertronian
- Affiliation: Autobots
- Significant other: Optimus Prime

Elita One is a character from the Transformers franchise. Originally depicted as the commander of a group of Autobot guerrilla fighters, most incarnations feature her in a leadership role among the Autobots. She is also often depicted as having a romantic relationship with Optimus Prime.

== History ==
In the first year of the Transformers brand, Hasbro rejected the notion of female Transformers. While working on the script for The Transformers: The Movie in late 1984, Ron Friedman successfully insisted on the inclusion of at least one female Transformer, which resulted in Arcee. Elita One is introduced in "The Search for Alpha Trion", an episode of the second season of the 1980s cartoon. In this episode, she is depicted as the female counterpart to Optimus Prime that remained on Cybertron to lead the remaining Autobots while Optimus was on Earth. Being introduced as part of the second season, Elita One and her team were the first female Transformers to appear in any medium. In the 1980s cartoon, she is voiced by Marlene Aragon.

The earliest product bearing Elita One's likeness was a garage kit by MC Axis released in 1996. This kit included Elita One's first profile and motto.

Elita One briefly appears as part of a trio of female Transformers in the opening sequence of the film Transformers: Revenge of the Fallen. However, this appearance is never referred to by name in the film, and her identity as Elita One is only established by a tie-in comic. The tie-in comic, titled Transformers: Dark of the Moon — Rising Storm, establishes her as a former romantic partner of the film's version of Optimus Prime. She races to warn Optimus of a Decepticon trap but is ultimately killed by the Decepticon Shockwave right as she reaches him. Elita One is one of the four main characters of the 2024 film Transformers One. Director Josh Cooley said that he wanted to "actually [make] her really important to the development of Orion Pax." In the film, Elita One is voiced by Scarlett Johansson. Her alternate mode in the film is a motorcycle.

Elita One features prominently in the Transformers comic series published by Image Comics and Skybound Entertainment. She debuts in the comic's second arc, in which she briefly travels to Earth to try to convince Optimus Prime to bring the Autobots back to defend their home planet of Cybertron. Optimus Prime's refusal to abandon Earth drives them into conflict, with Elita attacking Optimus and questioning his fitness to lead. In response, Optimus voluntarily relinquishes the Matrix of Leadership, (Note: The Matrix of Leadership is a mystical Autobot artefact that, according to Ron Friedman, is "the cybernetic, philosophical, physical and mystical core of Autobot leadership itself – the godhead".) and it chooses Elita as the new leader of the Autobots. Elita is transformed into Elita Prime and leads many of the Autobots back to Cybertron.
