= Transformers 1 =

Transformers 1 may refer to:

- Transformers (film), a 2007 live-action film
- Transformers One, a 2024 animated film

== See also ==
- Transformers: Generation 1, a 1984–1990 toy line
