= If I Should Fall Behind =

If I Should Fall Behind may refer to:

- "If I Should Fall Behind", a song by Bruce Springsteen from the 1992 album Lucky Town, also recorded by:
  - Dion DiMucci on the 1992 album Dream on Fire
  - Linda Ronstadt on the 1998 album “We Ran”
  - Faith Hill on the 1999 album Breathe
  - Robin and Linda Williams on the 2002 album Visions of Love
  - The Wave Pictures on the 2009 single "If I Should Fall Behind"
  - Paul Carrack on the 2012 album Good Feeling
  - Derek Ryan from the 2013 album Country Soul
  - Margo Timmins on the 2021 album The Ty Tyrfu Sessions
- If I Should Fall Behind, a short documentary about the 2012 album We Have Made A Spark by Rose Cousins

== See also ==
- If I Should Fall (disambiguation)
