= Sentinel Prime =

Transformers character

- Transformers character
- Sentinel Prime as he appears in The Transformers
- First appearance: The Transformers
- Created by: Simon Furman
- Voiced by: Townsend Coleman, Leonard Nimoy, Jon Hamm, others

In-universe information
- Affiliation: Autobots (allied with Decepticons in some continuities)

Sentinel Prime (Japanese: センチネルプライム), sometimes referred to as Sentinel Major or Sentinel Zeta Prime, is a character from the Transformers franchise. First appearing anonymously in a 1986 episode of the original animated series, the character was ultimately given the name Sentinel Prime in 1990 in the Transformers comic series #150 published by Marvel Comics, under the pen of Simon Furman. Being Optimus Prime's predecessor and a former leader of the Autobots, Sentinel Prime was gradually reinterpreted from the 2000s across the franchise's different continuities.

While the earliest incarnations generally depicts Sentinel Prime as a heroic leader whose death paves the way for Optimus Prime's ascension as Autobot commander, works published from the 2000s onward increasingly portray him as an authoritarian and morally ambiguous figure. This evolution culminated in 2011 with the release of Transformers: Dark of the Moon, the third installment in Michael Bay's live-action film series, in which Sentinel Prime was, for the first time, portrayed as the primary antagonist after betraying the Autobots in an attempt to restore Cybertron at the expense of Earth and humanity.

== History ==
The first depiction of an Autobot leader predating Optimus Prime appeared in 1986, in the fourth episode of the third season of the original Transformers animated series, Five Faces of Darkness: Part 4. During flashback sequences recounting the history of Cybertron, the episode features a blue-and-gold robot. Although the character is neither named on screen nor given any dialogue, he is identified in the production script as "U-Haul Robot", a designation likely inspired by his alternate mode, which resembles to the relocation trucks of the American company of the same name. Two years later, in 1988, issue #65 of Marvel Comics' Transformers comic series introduced its own interpretation of Optimus Prime's predecessor. The character appears briefly in a single panel, depicted in yellow and orange as he passes the Matrix of Leadership (Note: The Matrix of Leadership is a mystical Autobot artefact that, according to Ron Friedman, is "the cybernetic, philosophical, physical and mystical core of Autobot leadership itself – the godhead".) to his successor. However, it was not until issue #150, published in 1990, that British writer Simon Furman gave the character the name Sentinel Prime. Furman later reintroduced Sentinel in 2003 in Dreamwave Productions' comic series The War Within, which he also wrote. As in the original animated series, Sentinel is killed by Megatron, allowing Optimus Prime to succeed him as leader of the Autobots. At the time, nothing indicated that the unnamed robot from the original animated series and the character introduced in Marvel's comics were intended to represent the same individual, even though both fulfilled the role of Optimus Prime's predecessor. However, as Sentinel Prime made increasingly frequent appearances in later Transformers media, supplementary publications retroactively established, beginning in 2010, that the character from the original animated series was also an incarnation of Sentinel Prime.

Sentinel Prime was reintroduced by Scottish writer Eric Holmes in the four-issue comic book miniseries Megatron Origin, published by IDW Publishing in 2006. The story explores the origins of Megatron, a former miner turned revolutionary on Cybertron, then ruled by a corrupt regime under Sentinel Prime's leadership. This marked the first portrayal of Sentinel Prime as an authoritarian and morally ambiguous ruler. The following year, in the animated series Transformers: Animated, Sentinel Prime was reimagined as an arrogant and conceited Autobot military officer, serving under the Autobot Supreme Commander Ultra Magnus while acting as Optimus Prime's rival. The character was voiced by Townsend Coleman. The series' writers had originally planned to use another character—most notably Rodimus Prime, who had briefly succeeded Optimus following his death in the 1986 animated film—as Optimus's rival. The producers ultimately chose Sentinel Prime instead, apparently because Hasbro did not want to associate Rodimus's heroic reputation with such an unlikeable character. In 2010, another incarnation of Sentinel Prime, more closely resembling the character's earlier portrayals, appeared in the video game Transformers: War for Cybertron. During the Decepticon campaign, he is killed by Megatron, allowing Optimus Prime to succeed him as leader of the Autobots. The character was voiced by Troy Baker. Within the game, however, he is referred to exclusively as Zeta Prime. This name was borrowed from IDW Publishing's Transformers comics, in which Zeta Prime is a separate character from Sentinel. The reasons why High Moon Studios adopted this name remain unknown, especially since the character's concept art identifies him as Sentinel Prime. To reconcile this inconsistency, later supplementary material retroactively established that the character's full name in this continuity is Sentinel Zeta Prime.

Sentinel Prime gained widespread recognition with the release of Michael Bay's Transformers: Dark of the Moon in 2011. The character was voiced by Leonard Nimoy, best known for portraying Spock in the Star Trek franchise. For the first time in the franchise, Sentinel Prime served as the story's primary antagonist. Initially introduced as Optimus Prime's predecessor and mentor, he is ultimately revealed to have forged an alliance with Megatron in an attempt to restore Cybertron, chiefly by exploiting Earth's resources and enslaving humanity. Although Sentinel Prime subsequently appeared in only a limited number of media within the franchise, he returned in the animated film Transformers One, where he is voiced by Jon Hamm. In the film, he is portrayed as an authoritarian leader who is ultimately revealed to be the story's main antagonist.
