= Transformers One (soundtrack) =

Transformers One (Music from the Motion Picture)

Film score by Brian Tyler
- Released: September 20, 2024
- Studios: Eastwood Scoring Stage, Warner Bros., Los Angeles
- Genre: Film score
- Labels: Sony Classical; Milan
- Producers: Joe Lisanti; Brian Tyler

Brian Tyler chronology
Abigail (2024)	Transformers One (2024)	Nuremberg (2025)

Singles from Transformers: One (Music from the Motion Picture)
- 1. "If I Fall" Released: September 6, 2024; 2. "Transformers One Theme" Released: September 13, 2024

Transformers One (Music from the Motion Picture) is the soundtrack album to the 2024 film of the same name. It features the original score composed and conducted by Brian Tyler and was released by Sony Classical Records and Milan Records on September 20, 2024.

== Background ==
In May 2024, it was announced that Brian Tyler, who had previously provided the score for the animated television series Transformers: Prime (2010–2013), would compose the score for Transformers One. The score was recorded at the Eastwood Scoring Stage in Warner Bros. Studios Burbank. Tyler wanted to avoid a purely electronic sound for the score so integrated a full orchestra and choir. He described the Transformers as mechanical but very much human and with souls. Inspired by the music of Vangelis, he incorporated a Yamaha CS-80 into the score.

Tyler spent a lot of time on D-16's theme. Though D-16 eventually becomes the villainous Megatron, Tyler wanted to first make sure audiences understood where the character started from, which required an innocent and tragic sound. The composer aimed for an original sound that also highlighted the character's biomechanical nature. Brass and cellos were used for chord progression underneath the melody, alongside a "brassy synth". Tyler changed the chord progression to reflect D-16's corruption as the story progresses, while keeping the melody unchanged. He sought to capture something that sounded similar and still tragic but notably more villainous. To achieve this, Tyler kept the orchestra but drowned it in electronic instruments, most notably a Jupiter-8 synthesizer from 1982.

The soundtrack album features the score and was released by Sony Classical Records and Milan Records on September 20, 2024, the same day as the film's United States release. The film's main theme was released as a single on September 13 in promotion of the album.

== Original songs ==
An original song for the film, "If I Fall", written by Tyler and performed by Quavo, Ty Dolla $ign, and Tyler's project ARE WE DREAMING, was released as a single on September 6, 2024. A second original song, "Together As One", by DJ and producer Excision, was released on September 12, 2024.

When Tyler was hired to score the film he had been working on "Are We Dreaming", his audio-visual project. Director Josh Cooley, after seeing clips from the project, suggested Tyler to take the theme and turn it into a song. Tyler started writing the song as a personal way to both express gratitude to those who lifted him up in his low points in life and rebuke those who turned away, and felt it tied well to themes of Transformers One. After capturing the sound for the song, he sang a couple of verses including the chorus for the work-in-progress version. The producers then sent the song to Quavo. Ty Dolla Sign and Tyler had previously collaborated on 2014's "Shell Shocked", and after discussing together, the former agreed to join the project.

== Reception ==
Zanobard Reviews gave the album a 7.5 out of 10 rating and gave special praise towards the main theme. He concluded, "Overall Brian Tyler's score for Transformers One is a fun, vibrant effort that while perhaps not being the most ground-breaking or standout of the saga, doesn't stop it from being pretty damned entertaining throughout." Kevin Fenix of The Illuminerdi praised the score and felt that it helped to amplify the emotional beats. He described it as "a perfect blend of epic orchestration and subtle, emotional undertones" that complemented the story and action sequences. Tom Jorgensen of IGN felt the score was lackluster, describing it as "generically orchestral with rote touches of electronica that elevate neither the drama or action."

== Tracklisting ==
All tracks are written by Brian Tyler.

Transformers One (Music from the Motion Picture) track listing
No.	Title	Length
1.	"Transformers One Theme"	7:09
2.	"Birth of the Primes"	2:57
3.	"Orion Pax"	2:40
4.	"Destiny of the Primes"	5:26
5.	"Transform the Dark"	1:41
6.	"Metal to the Pedal"	3:16
7.	"Memory of the Forgotten"	2:05
8.	"The Contenders"	1:56
9.	"Trespaxxing"	2:09
10.	"More Than Meets the Eye"	4:50
11.	"Escape to the Surface"	3:09
12.	"Resting Place of the Primes"	4:00
13.	"The Ultimate Betrayal"	3:19
14.	"Echelon Now"	3:06
15.	"New Cog Potential"	2:49
16.	"Alpha’s Orders"	2:29
17.	"Hidden Truth"	3:20
18.	"Starscream"	4:01
19.	"Sealed Fate"	3:29
20.	"Together as One"	2:12
21.	"Coming of the Guard"	3:11
22.	"The Battle for Cybertron"	1:55
23.	"Prime Reason"	3:16
24.	"The Fall"	3:37
25.	"Battle of the Titans"	2:28
26.	"I Am Optimus Prime"	3:53
27.	"Transformers One End Title"	1:04

== Credits ==
Credits adapted from Film Music Reporter:

- Music composed and conducted by: Brian Tyler
- Supervising Music Editor: Joe Lisanti
- Music Editors: Matthew Llewellyn, Elizabeth Saltzman
- Music producer: Joe Lisanti, Brian Tyler
- Music executive producers: Lorenzo di Bonaventura and Michael Bay
- Music Arrangers: Chris Forsgren, Max Lombardo, Kenny Wood, John Carey, Evan Duffy, Sarah Trevino
- Orchestrators: Dana Niu, Brad Warnaar, Robert Elhai, Jeff Toyne, Andrew Kinney, Rossano Galante
- Copyists: Eric Stonerook, William Stromberg, Anna Stromberg, Scott McRae, Janis Stonerook, Erin Cadoret, Stacy Stonerook, Sandra Garrett
- Score Recorded by: Greg Hayes
- Score Mixed by: Greg Hayes, Brian Tyler
- Score Recorded at: Eastwood Scoring Stage, Warner Bros.
- Pro Tools Recordist: Chandler Harrod
- WB Executive Sound Staff / Stage Managers: Tom Hardisty, Richard Wheeler Jr., Peter Nelson, Ryan Nelson, Brian Bair, Dave Clark, Jamie Olvera
- Score Mixed at: Studio H, Lake Balboa, CA & Brian Tyler Studios, Los Angeles, CA
- Score Coordinators: Jackson Verolini, Drew Mikuska
- Tech Assistant: Sam Mohart
- Score Mix Assistant: Matt Friedman
- Music Contractor: Peter Rotter & Laura Jackman for Encompass Music Partners
