= If I Should Fall (disambiguation) =

If I Should Fall may refer to:

- If I Should Fall, a 2010 Canadian documentary film by director Brendon Culliton about death of Canadian soldier Marc Diab
- If I Should Fall from Grace with God, a 1988 album by the Pogues
  - "If I Should Fall from Grace with God" (song), lead song from the album above
- If I Should Fall to the Field, a 2002 album by Steve Von Till

== See also ==
- If I Should Fall Behind (disambiguation)
