= Godhead =

Theological concept

Godhead is a Middle English variant of the word godhood, and denotes the divinity or substance (ousia) of God. The term refers to the aspect or substratum of God that lies behind God's actions or properties (i.e., it is the essence of God), and its nature has been the subject of long debate in every major theistic religion.

== Variations ==
Godhead in Judaism refers to the unknowable aspect of God, which lies beyond his actions or emanations. Max Kadushin notes that "The plural 'Elohot, gods, must not be confused with 'Elohut, Godhead. The latter is used with reference to God".

Godhead in Christianity refers to the substantial essence or nature of God in Christianity, the substantial impersonal being of God, as opposed to the individual persons or hypostases of the Trinity; in other words, the Godhead refers to the "what" of God, and God refers to the "who" of God. The concept is especially important in Christian negative theology, e.g., the theology of the Godhead according to Pseudo-Dionysius. Within some traditions, such as the Church of Jesus Christ of Latter-day Saints, the term is used as a nontrinitarian substitute for the term Trinity, denoting the Father, Son, and Holy Spirit not as a Trinity, but as a unified council of separate beings in full harmony.

John Wycliffe introduced the term godhede into English Bible versions in two places, and, though somewhat archaic, the term survives in modern English because of its use in three places of the Tyndale New Testament (1525), the Geneva Bible (1560/1599), and King James Version (1611). In that translation, the word was used to translate three different Koine Greek words:

Verse	Greek	Romanization	Type	Translation	Vulgate 405	Wycliffe 1395	Tyndale 1525	ESV 2001
Acts 17:29	θεῖον	theion	adjective	"divine, godly"	divinum	that godli thing	godhed	the divine being
Romans 1:20	θειότης	theiotēs	noun	"divinity, divine nature"	divinitas	godhed	godhed	divine nature
Colossians 2:9	θεότης	theotēs	noun	"deity"	divinitas	the Godhed	the godheed	deity

God in Mormonism, as represented by most Mormon communities (including The Church of Jesus Christ of Latter-day Saints), means Elohim (the Father), whereas Godhead means a council of three distinct gods; Elohim, Jehovah (the Son, or Jesus), and the Holy Spirit. The Father and Son have perfected, material bodies, while the Holy Spirit is a spirit and does not have a body. This conception differs from the traditional Christian Trinity; in Mormonism, the three persons are considered to be physically separate beings or personages, but united in will and purpose. As such, the term differs from how it is used in traditional Christianity. This description of God represents the orthodoxy of The Church of Jesus Christ of Latter-day Saints (LDS Church), established early in the 19th century.

In Sikhism, the equivalent property is Ik Onkar, literally, "one Om", hence interpreted as "There is only one God or one Creator"), which denotes the one supreme reality. It is a central tenet of Sikh religious philosophy. According to Indologist Wendy Doniger, the phrase is a compound of ik ("one" in Punjabi) and onkar, canonically understood in Sikhism to refer to "absolute monotheistic unity of God".

== See also ==
- Conceptions of God
- God in Hinduism
  - Brahman, the divine source of being, through which all emanates
  - Paramatman, the "oversoul" or supreme spirit
  - Three godheads (Ayyavazhi) or Trimurti, Brahmā, Vishnu and Śhiva
  - Svayam Bhagavan or Supreme Personality of Godhead, the divine person from whom all emanates
