= Transformers One =

2024 film by Josh Cooley

- Theatrical release poster
- Directed by: Josh Cooley
- Screenplay by: Eric Pearson; Andrew Barrer; Gabriel Ferrari
- Story by: Andrew Barrer; Gabriel Ferrari
- Based on: Hasbro's Transformers action figures
- Produced by: Tom DeSanto; Don Murphy; Lorenzo di Bonaventura; Michael Bay; Mark Vahradian; Aaron Dem
- Starring: Chris Hemsworth; Brian Tyree Henry; Scarlett Johansson; Keegan-Michael Key; Steve Buscemi; Laurence Fishburne; Jon Hamm
- Cinematography: Christopher Batty
- Edited by: Lynn Hobson
- Music by: Brian Tyler
- Production companies: Paramount Animation; Hasbro Entertainment; New Republic Pictures; di Bonaventura Pictures; Bayhem Films
- Distributed by: Paramount Pictures
- Release dates: September 11, 2024 (Sydney); September 20, 2024 (United States)
- Running time: 104 minutes
- Country: United States
- Language: English
- Budget: $75–147 million
- Box office: $129 million

Transformers One is a 2024 American animated science fiction action film based on Hasbro's Transformers toy line. Directed by Josh Cooley and written by Eric Pearson, Andrew Barrer and Gabriel Ferrari, the film features the voices of Chris Hemsworth, Brian Tyree Henry, Scarlett Johansson, Keegan-Michael Key, Steve Buscemi, Laurence Fishburne, and Jon Hamm. It depicts the origins of Optimus Prime and Megatron.

In March 2015, following the release of Transformers: Age of Extinction (2014), Paramount Pictures tasked Akiva Goldsman to set up a writers' room to create ideas for potential future Transformers films. By May 2015, Barrer and Ferrari had signed on as writers, and they came up with the idea of an animated prequel set on Cybertron. The film was announced in August 2017, and by April 2020, Cooley had been hired to direct. Animation services were provided by Industrial Light & Magic, and the design was primarily influenced by the Generation 1 era and Art Deco. The score was composed by Brian Tyler.

Transformers One premiered in Sydney, Australia, on September 11, 2024, and was released by Paramount Pictures in the United States on September 20. The film received positive reviews from critics but underperformed at the box office, grossing $129 million worldwide on a budget of $75–147 million.

== Plot ==
Cybertron is a technological world formed by the body of the deity Primus and inhabited by sentient robots fueled by a substance called Energon, who live in a hierarchy based on whether they possess a 'transformation cog' that allows them to shapeshift into vehicles. In the underground city of Iacon, Orion Pax, a cogless mining robot, sneaks into an archive to learn about the first-generation Cybertronians, the Primes. Security guards spot and chase Orion, but his best friend, D-16, helps him escape. Later, during a cave-in at the Energon mine where they work, the two break protocol to save fellow miner Jazz. However, this worsens the disaster, and their superior, Elita-1, is blamed and demoted for it by their callous overseer, Darkwing.

Iacon's leader, Sentinel Prime, returns from an expedition to the surface to find the lost Matrix of Leadership; its absence caused Energon to stop flowing and forced miners to extract it. Though unable to find it, he reprieves the populace with a race. To prove themselves as more than miners, Orion enters himself and D-16 illegally using jetpacks, but they narrowly lose. While Sentinel promises to reward the two for inadvertently boosting mining morale, Darkwing drags them to garbage incineration, where they meet the eccentric B-127. Finding a distress message from the Prime Alpha Trion in the junk, Orion convinces D-16 and B-127 to travel with him to its coordinates on the surface; later persuading Elita to join as well when she catches them sneaking out of Iacon.

The group finds Alpha Trion in a cave, deactivated alongside the other Primes' corpses. Upon reactivation, he reveals that Sentinel is a pretender who killed the real Primes to steal the Matrix from them, only for it to disappear when Primus deemed him unworthy. In truth, Sentinel has been giving Energon to Cybertron's enemies, aliens called Quintessons, in exchange for allowing him to rule the planet, and he created the hierarchy by removing some Cybertronians' cogs before activation. Alpha Trion gives the group the fallen Primes' cogs, allowing them to transform, and a chip with evidence of Sentinel's treason. They are then ambushed by Sentinel's lieutenant, Airachnid, who captures Trion and brings him back to Iacon, where Sentinel executes him.

Evading pursuit, the group rushes back to Iacon but is captured by the Primes' former army, the Cybertronian High Guard, who are rebelling against Sentinel. D-16 takes command of the High Guard by defeating their leader, Starscream, but Orion grows concerned about his friend's newfound aggression after learning the truth. Sentinel's troops find them, and in the ensuing battle, the evidence chip is destroyed while D-16, B-127, and Starscream are captured along with most of the High Guard. Taken to Iacon, D-16 learns that Sentinel stole the cog of his idol, Megatronus Prime, whose face Sentinel mockingly brands onto him.

Encouraged by Elita, Orion rallies the remaining High Guard members and returns to Iacon to rescue their comrades. After subduing Darkwing, Orion enlists the miners' aid to assault Sentinel's headquarters, freeing the captives. As the High Guard battles Sentinel's forces, Orion, Elita, and B-127 expose the truth by capturing Airachnid and broadcasting her memory recordings throughout the city, causing the populace to turn on Sentinel. D-16 defeats Sentinel but gets into an argument with Orion over whether to kill him, resulting in D-16 accidentally shooting Orion before letting him fall to his death. D-16 then kills Sentinel, takes Megatronus' cog, renames himself Megatron, and begins destroying Iacon, with the High Guard siding with him.

Deeming Orion worthy, Primus and the spirits of the Primes bestow the Matrix onto him and revive him as Optimus Prime. Confronting Megatron, Optimus then defeats and exiles him from Iacon alongside the High Guard. Afterward, the Matrix restores the miners' cogs and makes Energon flow again as Optimus becomes Iacon's new leader, christens his followers as Autobots, and sends a message warning the Quintessons to stay away from Cybertron. Meanwhile, Megatron reforms the High Guard into the Decepticons, using Megatronus' face as their insignia, and declares war on the Autobots.

== Voice cast ==
- Chris Hemsworth as Orion Pax / Optimus Prime, a rebellious but good-hearted miner
- Brian Tyree Henry as D-16 / Megatron, a miner and Orion's best friend
- Scarlett Johansson as Elita-1, an arrogant mining supervisor later demoted to waste management
- Keegan-Michael Key as B-127, a talkative garbage sorter
- Steve Buscemi as Starscream, the leader of the Cybertronian High Guard
- Laurence Fishburne as Alpha Trion, an ancient Prime
- Jon Hamm as Sentinel Prime, the ruler of Cybertron and a false Prime

Additional cast members include; Vanessa Liguori as Airachnid, Sentinel's spider-themed consigliere who transforms into a drone, Jon Bailey as Soundwave, the Cybertronian High Guard's communications officer, Jason Konopisos-Alvarez as Shockwave, a one-eyed member of the Cybertronian High Guard, Evan Michael Lee as Jazz, a miner and a colleague of Orion, and Isaac C. Singleton Jr. as Darkwing, a strict Cybertronian dockworker who is one of Sentinel's subordinates and oversees the mining and waste management workers.

Voice-related cameos include Steve Blum, who had contributed voice work throughout the franchise as the announcer for the Iacon-5000 speedway and James Remar, who previously voiced Sideswipe in Transformers: Dark of the Moon (2011), as Zeta Prime, a member of the Thirteen Primes and the former wielder of the Matrix of Leadership.

== Production ==
=== Development ===
Following the release of Transformers: Age of Extinction (2014), Paramount Pictures tasked Akiva Goldsman in March 2015 to work with the film franchise's director Michael Bay, executive producer Steven Spielberg, and producer Lorenzo di Bonaventura to set up a writers' room to create ideas for future Transformers films. According to Goldsman, the writing team would look at various Transformers media created by Hasbro for inspiration; if they found one that interested them, they could submit a treatment, which would then be further developed by the whole team. In late May, the team of Andrew Barrer and Gabriel Ferrari signed on as writers. According to Deadline Hollywood, one of the ideas from the writer's room had the working title Transformers One and would serve as an animated prequel focusing on the Autobot–Decepticon conflict that began on Cybertron.

In August 2017, it was reported that an animated Transformers film was officially in the works set in the same universe as the Bayverse films. Following the release of Bumblebee (2018), di Bonaventura discussed the animated film, clarifying that it was "in the works" and would "tell the whole Cybertron mythology". Bumblebee director Travis Knight additionally expressed interest in the film.

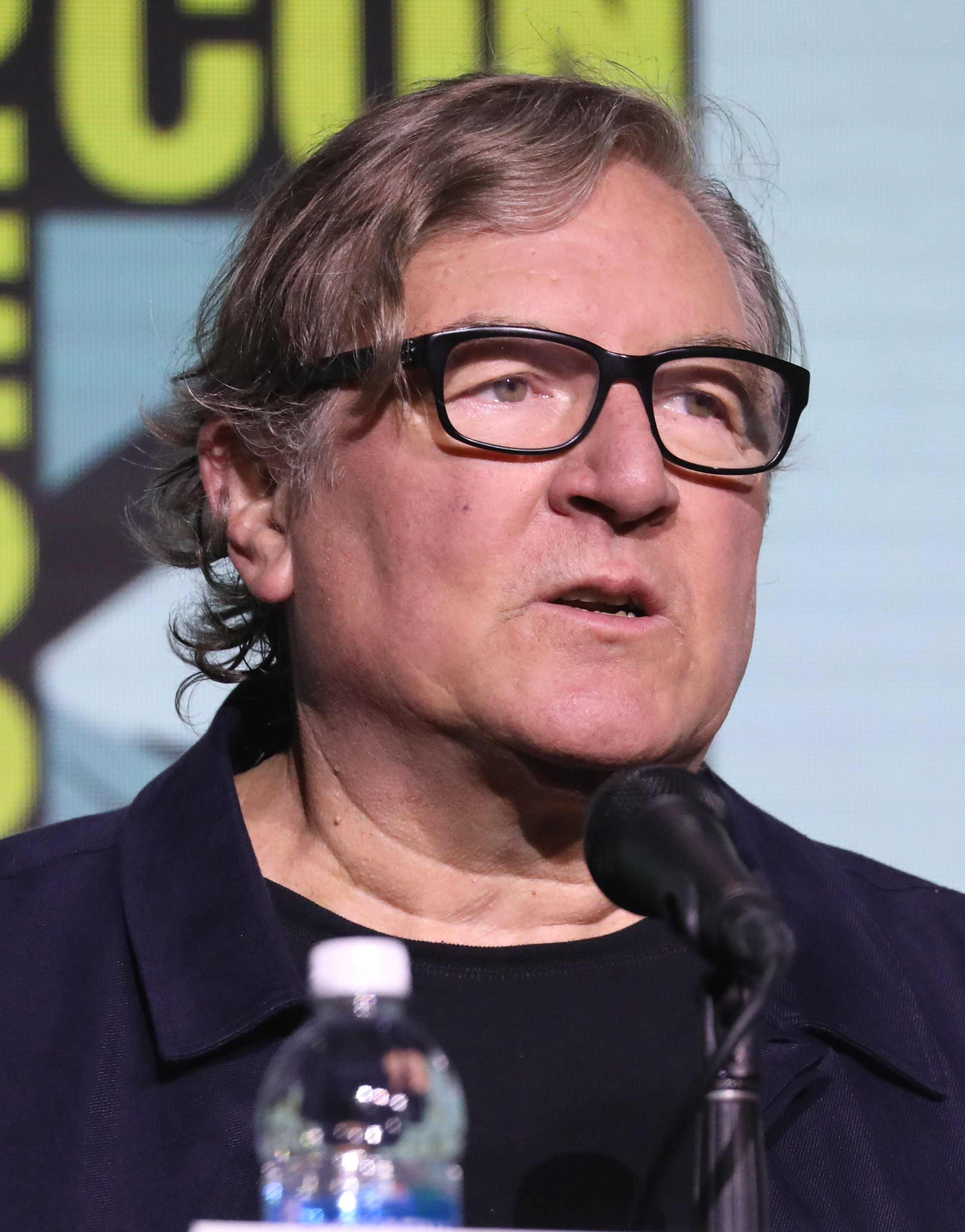
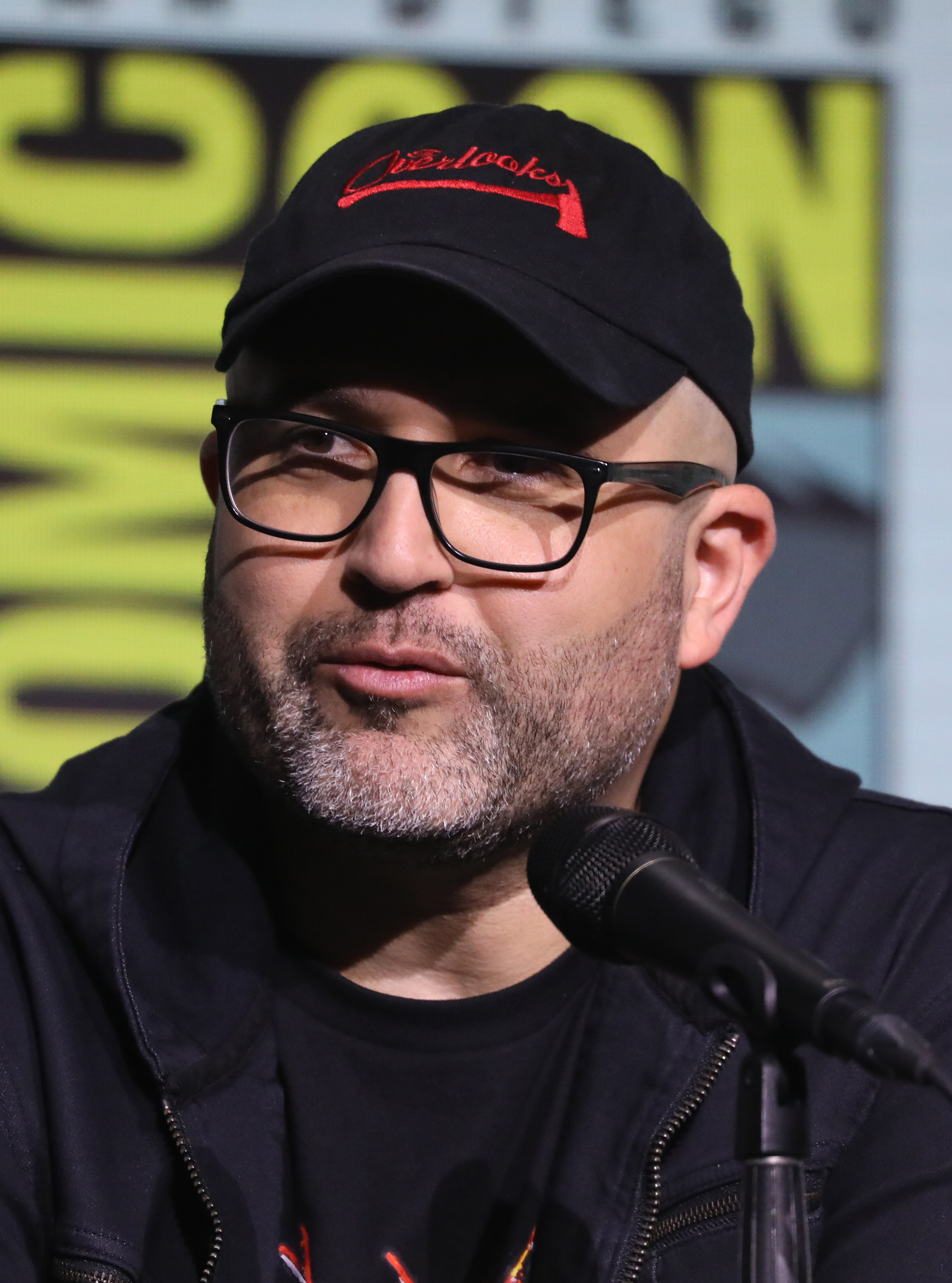
Producer Lorenzo di Bonaventura and director Josh Cooley in 2024

In April 2020, it was reported that former Pixar animator and filmmaker Josh Cooley had been hired to direct the film and was overseeing the script by Barrer and Ferrari. Hasbro Entertainment and Paramount Animation would produce the film. In February 2022, it emerged that the film would be computer-animated. In December 2022, the title was reported to be Transformers: A New Generation, though di Bonaventura later stated in April 2023 that the title had yet to be finalized. Later that month, at CinemaCon, the title was officially confirmed as Transformers One. di Bonaventura stated that the plot will center around the origins of the Transformers, and explore the events that lead Optimus and Megatron to go from being brothers-in-arms to becoming enemies. The budget was reportedly $75 million, although an Animation Magazine interview with Cooley and di Bonaventura put the cost of production as high as $147 million.

=== Writing ===
Eric Pearson, Barrer, and Ferrari received screenplay credit, with Barrer and Ferrari receiving story credits. When Cooley joined the project, Hasbro gave him a bible that covered the lore for the entire franchise. Cooley wanted to capture an "epic quality" and grand scale for the film and used The Transformers: The Movie (1986) and Dune (1965) as points of reference. As there are no human characters in Transformers One as they are in previous films in the franchise, Cooley and the team aimed to "inject more comedy and humanity" into the Transformers themselves. They wanted to make sure that the characters had enough humor and emotion to carry the story on their own. The film depicts how the Transformers gained the ability to transform, an idea Cooley found appealing. He felt that there was fun in seeing the characters learn and adapt to their new powers.

The relationship between Optimus Prime and Megatron and the tragedy of their falling out is the emotional core of the film. For Cooley, it was important to show that Megatron was not just a villain. He wanted people who did not know Transformers to come into the film and not be able to immediately pick up who was going to be good or bad. He took inspiration from several famous brothers-turned-enemies stories from across pop culture when crafting the story arc. As a reference to his previous origin story, the film originally included a scene depicting Megatron as a gladiator, to have him and Optimus Prime come from completely different backgrounds. Due to runtime constraints, that idea was scrapped and they were both made to be coworkers in the mines instead.

=== Casting and voice recording ===
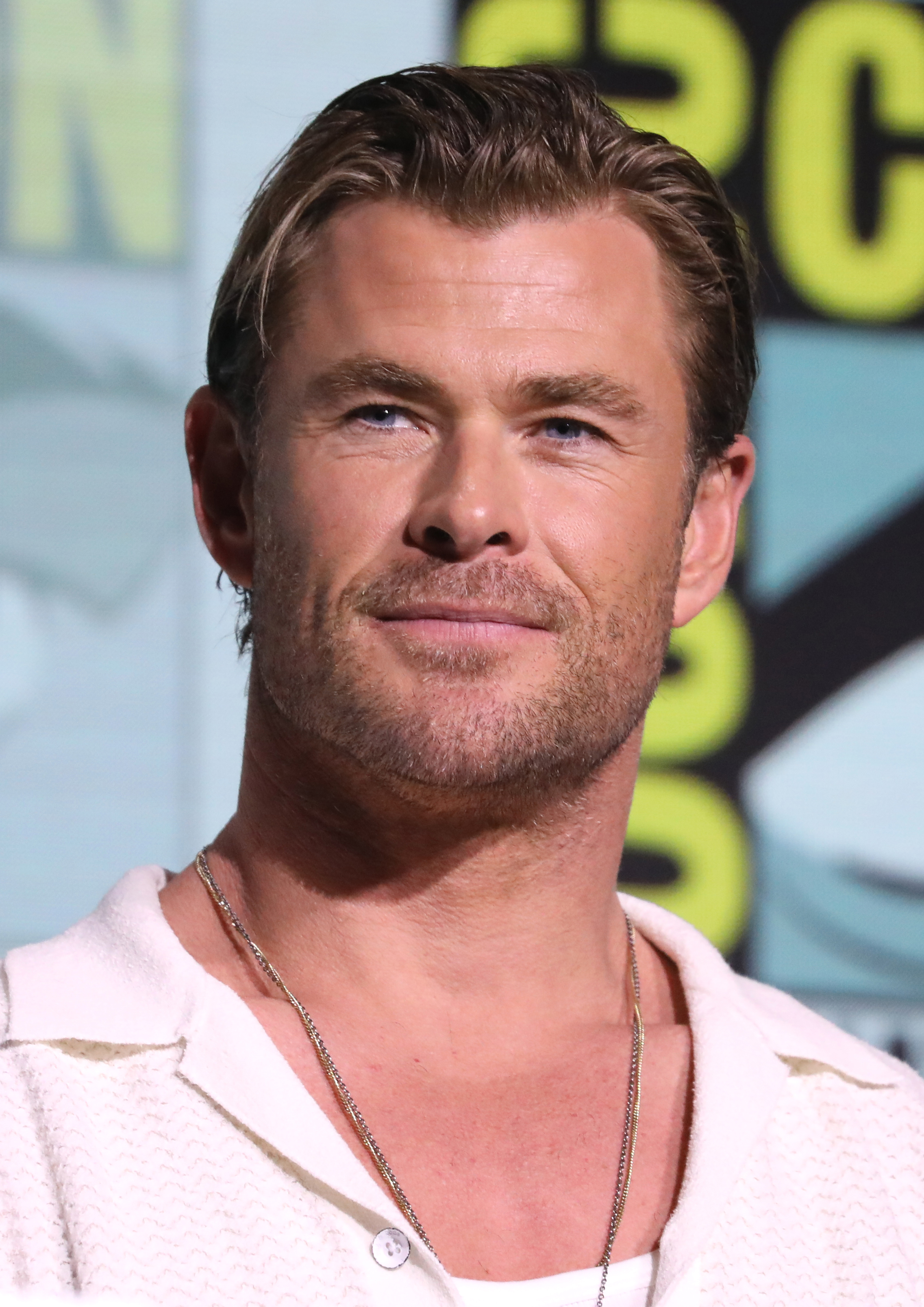
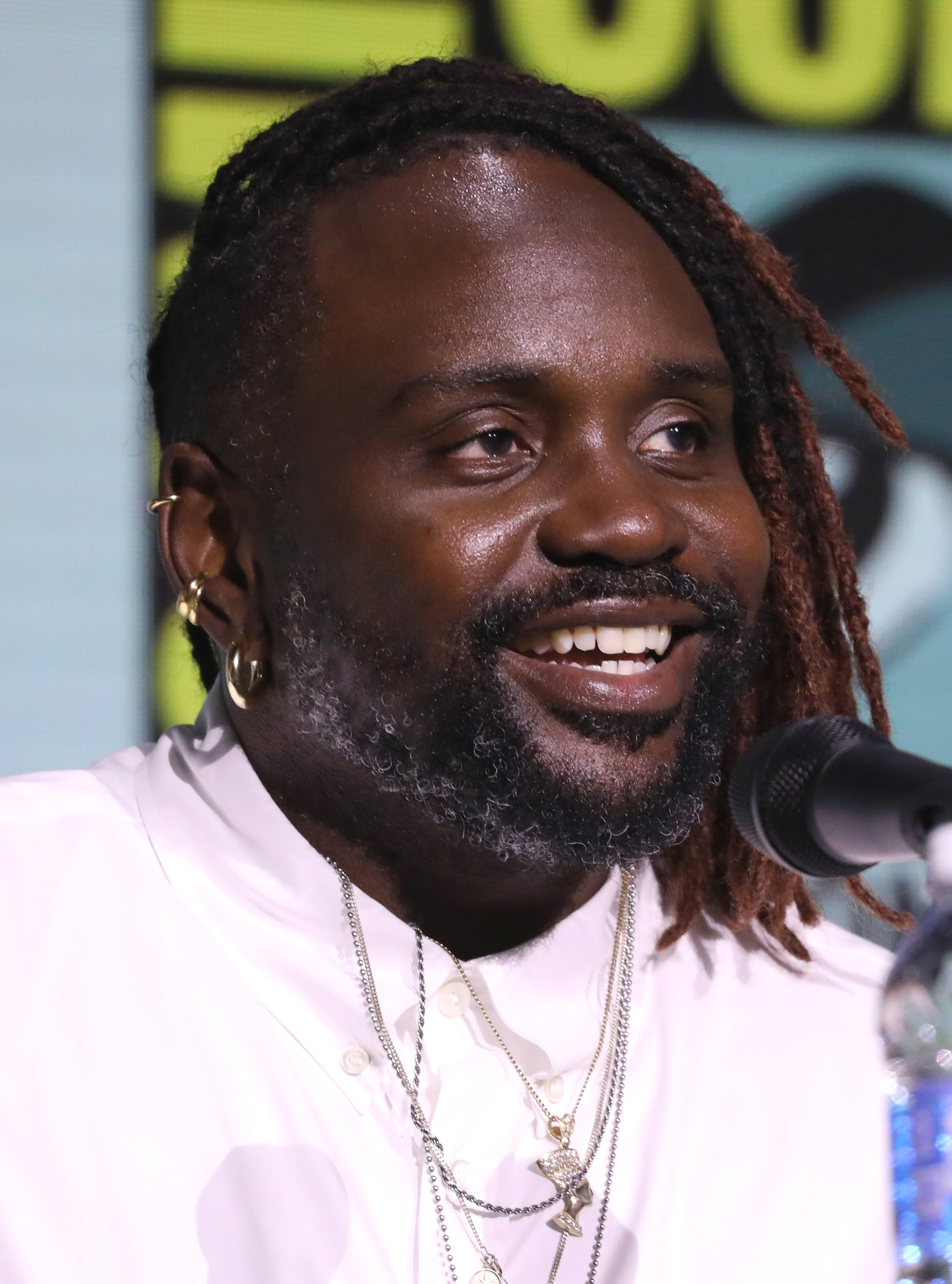
Chris Hemsworth and Brian Tyree Henry in 2024

The voice cast of the film was announced at CinemaCon in April 2023, consisting of Chris Hemsworth and Brian Tyree Henry as younger versions of Optimus Prime and Megatron, alongside Scarlett Johansson, Keegan-Michael Key, Jon Hamm, and Laurence Fishburne headlining. In April 2024, Steve Buscemi, who had previously voiced Daytrader in Transformers: The Last Knight (2017), was cast as Starscream. Cooley desired to get a voice cast as impressive as that of The Transformers: The Movie.

Transformers One was Hemsworth's first animated feature film. He joined the project after being impressed with the screenplay. Hemsworth made efforts to not use his regular speaking voice for Optimus Prime. Many of Hemsworth's lines in the film were "riff offs" from what the filmmakers wrote, bringing his charisma and comedy to them. From a fan's point of view, di Bonaventura felt important to respect longtime Optimus Prime actor Peter Cullen's performance while not bringing him back to ensure the audience felt Prime's youth, leading to Hemsworth's casting, who surprised di Bonaventura with his "very strong sense of story".

Cooley's desire to harken back to the chattier version of Bumblebee seen in other Transformers media influenced Key's casting, who he had worked with before when directing Pixar's Toy Story 4 (2019). Cooley requested that Key stay close to his regular speaking voice for Bumblebee. Johansson was approached to voice Elita by Hemsworth, who texted her upon joining the project himself. The two had previously worked together in several Marvel Cinematic Universe (MCU) films.

Around before the film's release in August 2024, more additional cast members were announced for the film which included voice actor and longtime fan Jon Bailey reprising his role as Soundwave from Bumblebee (2018) and Isaac C. Singleton Jr., who previously voiced Soundwave in several Transformers video games developed by High Moon Studios as Darkwing.

=== Animation and design ===
Industrial Light & Magic (ILM), who had provided the visual effects for the first six live-action Transformers installments, returned to provide the animation for the film. Rob Coleman served as animation supervisor, and Frazier Churchill served as VFX supervisor. Cooley directed the studio to create a visual style for the film that was realistic enough to be believable while still looking like it was crafted by human hands.

The designs of the Transformers were heavily influenced by those of Generation 1. Cooley said, "They're really clear and have these great silhouettes. It was important to hit that." The team began by looking at the work of original Transformers character designer, Floro Dery. Art Deco was a big influence on the film's production and character design, with Cooley describing the style as being all about post-depression. He felt it to be relevant to the film as it takes place before the planet of Cybertron falls apart and while things are still going well. In order to make the Transformers feel more human and for the audiences to better connect, the team at ILM was instructed to make them more emotive with their faces and character animation. Measures applied to ensure this included making sure their faces were not covered all of the time and making their eyes more expressive. Cooley felt a grand sense of scale was essential to the Transformers brand. As there are no humans in the film to use as a scale reference, the team looked to Cybertron instead and aimed to make it feel larger than life.

=== Music ===
In May 2024, it was announced that Brian Tyler, who had previously provided the score for the animated television series Transformers: Prime (2010–2013), would compose the score for Transformers One. The soundtrack album features the score and was released by Sony Classical Records and Milan Records on September 20, 2024. An original song for the film, "If I Fall", written by Tyler and performed by Quavo and Ty Dolla Sign, was released as a single on September 6, 2024. A second original song, "Together As One", by DJ and producer Excision, was released on September 12, 2024.

== Release ==
Transformers One screened as a work-in-progress at the Annecy International Animation Film Festival on June 10, 2024; audience and social media reactions were reportedly positive. The film premiered in Sydney, Australia on September 11, 2024, and was theatrically released in the United States on September 20, 2024. It was screened in various formats, including RealD 3D, IMAX, Dolby Cinema, and 4DX. It was originally scheduled to be released on July 19, 2024, but was initially delayed to September 13, before shifting a week later to avoid competition with Beetlejuice Beetlejuice.

=== Marketing ===
The first trailer for Transformers One was released online on April 18, 2024 to positive response. It featured a custom introduction from Hemsworth and Henry, and incorporated the song "Start Me Up" by the Rolling Stones. It made its debut via a spacecraft that was launched 125,000 feet above the Earth. Brian Welk of IndieWire felt that the film looked to have appeal for both younger audiences and longtime Transformers fans. Alex Billington of FirstShowing.net found the trailer amusing and felt that the film had promise, though he opined that it seemed to be more geared towards younger audiences than compared to previous Transformers films. Eric Diaz of Nerdist commented that the incorporation of "Start Me Up" gave the film "a very 2000s DreamWorks Animation vibe." A second trailer debuted at San Diego Comic-Con on July 25, 2024.

=== Home media ===
Transformers One was released on premium video-on-demand services on October 22, 2024, with Ultra HD Blu-ray, Blu-ray, and DVD copies distributed by Paramount Home Entertainment released on December 17, 2024. It was released on the Paramount+ streaming service on November 15, 2024.

== Reception ==
=== Box office ===
Transformers One grossed $59.1 million in the United States and Canada, and $70.3 million in other territories, for a worldwide total of $129 million.

In the United States and Canada, Transformers One was released alongside The Substance and Never Let Go, and was projected to gross $30–40 million from 3,978 theaters in its opening weekend. The film made $9.6 million on its first day, including $3.4 million from Wednesday and Thursday night previews. It went on to debut to $24.6 million, finishing second behind holdover Beetlejuice Beetlejuice. The opening weekend gross was deemed disappointing, but there was optimism that the film would do well over time. In its second weekend, the film had a 62.8% drop, making only $9.1 million and finishing in third. This was attributed to the lack of marketing and interest from families, as well as facing competition from The Wild Robot, which took over in premium format screens.

Internationally, the film was released on dates ranging from September 11, 2024 (in Indonesia), to October 24, 2024 (in Israel). In the United Kingdom and Ireland region, where it released on October 11, 2024, the film opened to £1.6 million, ranking it above DC Comics holdover Joker: Folie à Deux.

=== Critical response ===
On the review aggregator website Rotten Tomatoes, 89% of 170 critics' reviews are positive, with an average rating of 7.3/10. The website's consensus reads: "Dramatically satisfying with a dash of good humor, Transformers One suggests that animation might be the optimal medium for this oft-adapted franchise." Metacritic, which uses a weighted average, assigned the film a score of 65 out of 100, based on 31 critics, indicating "generally favorable" reviews. Audiences polled by CinemaScore gave the film an average grade of "A" on an A+ to F scale, while those surveyed by PostTrak gave it an average five out of five stars, with 75% saying they would definitely recommend it.

Todd Gilchrist of Variety praised the film's direction, animation, and screenplay. He felt the film boasted a level of complexity and described it as "the most sophisticated onscreen portrait" of the Transformers to date. G. Allen Johnson of the San Francisco Chronicle compared the film favorably to the live-action installments, applauding its screenplay, visuals, and resonant themes, and describing it as unapologetically made for "the inner child." Carlos Aguilar of the Los Angeles Times opined that the film benefitted from the low quality standard set by prior Transformers films, but still commended it for its screenplay, themes, humor, animation, and emotional core. Adam Graham of The Detroit News awarded the film a B− rating, praising the animation, direction, screenplay, and humor, and comparing it favorably to the live-action installments.

Frank Scheck of The Hollywood Reporter praised the film for its direction, animation, screenplay, and emotional core and felt it to have revitalized the Transformers franchise. Leigh Monson of The A.V. Club awarded the film a B− rating. They commended the story, animation, and voice performances, though felt the film to be predictable and unambitious. Randy Myers of The Mercury News gave the film a 3 out of 4 rating and referred to it as the best of the Paramount Transformers films. They lauded the humor, voice performances, and animation.

Tom Jorgensen of IGN rated the film 5 out of 10, praising the voice cast and Brian Tyree Henry's performance, as well as the story of Orion Pax and D-16. Overall he felt the film was underwhelming and was critical of it for being surface-level and featuring illegible action scenes. Soren Andersen of The Seattle Times gave the film a 2 out of 4 star rating. He commended Keegan-Michael Key's performance but felt the film to be overall an exhausting experience due to an overabundance of action scenes. Wilson Chapman of IndieWire gave the film a C grade and said: "It's all executed competently but joylessly, with zero fun to be had as it labors across an hour and 40 minute runtime that feels both too short and painfully long."

=== Accolades ===
Award	Date of ceremony	Category	Recipient(s)	Result	Ref.
Washington D.C. Area Film Critics Association	December 8, 2024	Best Voice Performance	Brian Tyree Henry	Nominated	
San Diego Film Critics Society	December 9, 2024	Best Animated Film	Transformers One	Nominated	
Seattle Film Critics Society	December 16, 2024	Best Animated Film	Transformers One	Nominated	
Saturn Awards	February 2, 2025	Best Animated Film	Transformers One	Nominated	
AACTA Awards	February 7, 2025	Best Visual Effects or Animation	Frazer Churchill, Fiona Chilton, Stephen King, Feargal Stewart, Alex Popescu	Nominated	
Movieguide Awards	February 7, 2025	Epiphany Prizes for Movies	Transformers One	Nominated	
Black Reel Awards	February 10, 2025	Outstanding Voice Performance	Brian Tyree Henry	Nominated	
Visual Effects Society Awards	February 11, 2025	Outstanding Visual Effects in an Animated Feature	Frazer Churchill, Fiona Chilton, Josh Cooley, Stephen King	Nominated	
Visual Effects Society Awards	February 11, 2025	Outstanding Created Environment in an Animated Feature	Alex Popescu, Geoffrey Lebreton, Ryan Kirby, Hussein Nabeel (for "Iacon City")	Nominated	
Nickelodeon Kids' Choice Awards	June 21, 2025	Favorite Animated Movie	Transformers One	Nominated	
Nickelodeon Kids' Choice Awards	June 21, 2025	Favorite Male Animated Voice from a Movie	Chris Hemsworth	Nominated	
Nickelodeon Kids' Choice Awards	June 21, 2025	Favorite Female Animated Voice from a Movie	Scarlett Johansson	Nominated	

== Future ==
In April 2023, di Bonaventura stated that there was discussion for Transformers One to become a trilogy of films. By June, he confirmed that the story was mapped out to progress over three movies, detailing the progression of the characters into their depiction in the live-action film series. The producer explained that Hemsworth's depiction of Optimus Prime would grow into the leader depicted in the previous installments, stating that the transition from Hemsworth's voice to Peter Cullen's would make sense within the story. In September 2024, di Bonaventura confirmed that they would make a Transformers One sequel if the film succeeded at the box office, with the filmmakers already devising ideas for a character-driven sequel like its predecessor.

On November 20, 2024, following the film's underperformance, Hasbro announced that they would no longer co-finance film adaptations based on their properties, leaving external studios to exclusively fund such projects. The following month, Tyree Henry expressed hopes of a sequel being officially confirmed. Instead of a new film, One was followed by an animated series titled Transformers One: New Adventures, which premiered on the official Transformers YouTube channel on January 17, 2025.

During a BotCon panel in June 2025, Cooley stated that Paramount is not interested in producing a full sequel, although he asserted, "We'll see what happens. You never know." A week later, it was reported that Cooley would return to direct an installment in the live-action film series.
