= List of Transformers: Prime episodes =

Transformers: Prime is an animated television series which premiered on November 26, 2010, on Hub Network, Hasbro's and Discovery's joint venture, which began broadcasting that year in the United States. Transformers: Prime was renewed for a second season, which premiered on February 18, 2012, also on Hub Network. The third and final season premiered on March 22, 2013.

== Series overview ==
Season	Episodes	Originally released	
Season	Episodes	First released	Last released
1	26	November 26, 2010	October 15, 2011
2	26	February 18, 2012	November 2, 2012
3	13	March 22, 2013	July 26, 2013
TV movie		October 4, 2013	

== Episodes ==
=== Season 1 (2010–11) ===
No. overall	No. in season	Title	Directed by	Written by	U.S. original air date	Prod. code
1	1	"Darkness Rising, Part 1"	David Hartman	Duane Capizzi	November 26, 2010	101
Autobot Cliffjumper is killed by the Decepticons' commander, Starscream. In Jasper, Nevada, two young humans—Jack Darby and Rafael Esquivel—are accidentally caught in the crossfire of a fight between giant, mechanical aliens that transform into ordinary vehicles. The two kids are taken to the base of the Autobots, where the Autobot leader Optimus Prime explains that he and his team are a race of autonomous robotic organisms from the far-off planet Cybertron, and they are fighting over their life-source, Energon, with the Decepticons, with whom they once had a war.: Debuts: Optimus Prime, Arcee, Bumblebee, Bulkhead, Ratchet, Cliffjumper, Jack Darby, Rafael Esquievel, Miko Nakadai, Sierra, Megatron, Starscream, Soundwave and Vehicons; Deaths: Cliffjumper
2	2	"Darkness Rising, Part 2"	David Hartman	Nicole Dubuc	November 26, 2010	102
The Decepticon leader Megatron returns from a three-year exile with a plan to exploit the properties of a mysterious substance called "Dark Energon", which has the ability to turn the bodies of dead Transformers into zombie-like Terrorcons. The Autobots storm an Energon mine in search of their lost comrade Cliffjumper, only to discover that his dead body has been revived as a ravenous zombie by Dark Energon.: Debuts: William Fowler, June Darby, and Decepticon Miners; Deaths: Cliffjumper (Terrorcon)
3	3	"Darkness Rising, Part 3"	Todd Waterman	Marsha Griffin	December 1, 2010	103
Optimus Prime and Ratchet head out to investigate Megatron's activities while Arcee and Bumblebee go on patrol, leaving Bulkhead with Jack, Miko and Rafael at the base. Meanwhile, Soundwave kidnaps the human Agent William Fowler, with Starscream wishing to learn the location of the Autobots' base.: Debuts: Laserbeak and Terrorcons
4	4	"Darkness Rising, Part 4"	Shaunt Nigoghossian	Steven Melching	December 2, 2010	104
Bulkhead, Arcee and Bumblebee sneak on to the Decepticon warship, the Nemesis, to rescue Agent Fowler, while Optimus Prime and Ratchet fight off Megatron and a horde of Dark Energon zombies.: Deaths: Terrorcons
5	5	"Darkness Rising, Part 5"	Vinton Heuck	Joseph Kuhr	December 3, 2010	105
With the Decepticons completing their Space Bridge to Cybertron, Optimus Prime and the Autobots race to stop Megatron from opening the Bridge and bringing forth a vast army of Dark Energon zombies from the Cybertronians' dead home world.
6	6	"Masters and Students"	Todd Waterman	David Slack	February 11, 2011	106
Following Megatron's supposed demise, Starscream appoints himself as the new Decepticon leader. However, to his annoyance, he finds that the troops don't respect him as much as they did Megatron and are weary towards him becoming leader. In order to gain their respect, Starscream awakens Skyquake, a legendary Decepticon warrior who was entombed in stasis on Earth for centuries, and attempts to recruit him into his new army. Meanwhile, Ratchet agrees to help Jack, Miko and Rafael with their school science projects, with explosive results.: Debuts/Deaths: Skyquake
7	7	"Scrapheap"	Shaunt Nigoghossian	Marsha Griffin	February 18, 2011	107
While on a scouting mission in the Arctic, Bulkhead and Bumblebee find a crashed space pod buried in the ice. They bring it back to base for examination, and Optimus Prime and Arcee venture out into the Arctic to find clues on the pod's origin. While they are out, the other Autobots discover that the pod contains a large swarm of Scraplets, a vicious and highly dangerous form of Cybertronian wildlife that eats metal. The Scraplets infest the Autobot base, devouring any metal in sight and damaging the Ground Bridge, leaving Optimus and Arcee stranded in the Arctic.: Debuts: Scraplets
8	8	"Con Job"	Vinton Heuck	Steven Melching	February 25, 2011	108
The Autobots receive a message from Wheeljack, an old friend and partner of Bulkhead's from the days of the war, who is visiting Earth while journeying across the galaxy. Upon picking up the message's signal, Starscream and Soundwave capture Wheeljack before he can meet the Autobots, and they send in Makeshift, a Decepticon spy able to take on any form, disguised as Wheeljack to discover the location of the Autobot base.: Debuts: Wheeljack and Makeshift; Deaths: Makeshift
9	9	"Convoy"	Todd Waterman	Joseph Kuhr	March 4, 2011	109
Agent Fowler asks for the Autobots' assistance in transporting a powerful nuclear device to a military base, but since sending such a device through the Ground Bridge could be potentially dangerous, they have to travel by road. Along the way, the Autobots are ambushed by M.E.C.H., a terrorist organization who wish to steal the nuclear device and use it for their own nefarious purposes. And to make things worse, the Decepticons get involved as well.: Debuts: Silas and M.E.C.H.
10	10	"Deus Ex Machina"	Shaunt Nigoghossian	Nicole Dubuc	March 11, 2011	110
The Autobots discover that an Energon Harvester, an ancient and powerful device from Cybertron's distant past, is on display in a museum, and they attempt to retrieve it with Jack, Miko and Rafael's aid before it falls into the wrong hands. Starscream also learns of the Harvester's whereabouts, and he sends Soundwave, along with new Decepticons Knock Out and Breakdown, to obtain it.: Debuts: Knock Out and Breakdown
11	11	"Speed Metal"	Vinton Heuck	Dean Stefan	April 9, 2011	111
In an attempt to get even with school bully Vince, as well as impress his crush Sierra, Jack convinces Bumblebee to help him win an illegal street race. However, things go awry when Knock Out gets involved in the action, kidnapping Vince in the belief that he is Bumblebee's human partner.: Debuts: Vince
12	12	"Predatory"	Todd Waterman & Kirk Van Wormer (Co-Director)	Marsha Griffin	April 16, 2011	112
Jack accompanies Arcee on a routine scouting mission in a forest, where they discover a crashed space ship. They soon discover that the owner of the ship, the deadly and ruthless Decepticon sadist known as Airachnid, is still prowling the forest in search of a human to hunt, putting Jack in danger and causing Arcee to have visions regarding her last encounter with Airachnid on Cybertron during a mission with her partner Tailgate.: Debuts: Airachnid and Tailgate (flashbacks); Deaths: Tailgate (flashback)
13	13	"Sick Mind"	Shaunt Nigoghossian	Steven Melching	April 30, 2011	113
While exploring the wreckage of a crashed Autobot spaceship in a desert, Optimus Prime becomes infected with the Cybonic Plague, a deadly virus that leaves him in a critical condition. Arcee and Bumblebee sneak on to the Nemesis in order to find a cure for the virus. Following Ratchet's advice, Arcee uses a cortical psychic patch to send Bumblebee into Megatron's subconscious, where knowledge of the cure is located. However, Starscream and Knock Out hatch a plan to terminate their leader permanently, putting Bumblebee's mission in jeopardy.
14	14	"Out of His Head"	Vinton Heuck	Nicole Dubuc	May 7, 2011	114
Megatron's subconscious is mistakenly downloaded into Bumblebee's head, where the tyrant manipulates Bumblebee's mind in a plan to return to his original body and reclaim Decepticon leadership. Meanwhile, Starscream steals the lens from a powerful space telescope and attempts to use it to melt through ice in the Arctic to gain access to an underground Energon deposit. As the Autobots intervene, Megatron manipulates Bumblebee into infiltrating the Decepticon Warship and restoring him back to life with Dark Energon. Subsequently, Megatron confronts and punishes Starscream over his treachery, indirectly saving Optimus Prime in the process.
15	15	"Shadowzone"	Todd Waterman	Marsha Griffin	May 14, 2011	115
Starscream attempts to use a shard of Dark Energon to revive the dead body of Skyquake, but his plan is impeded by the Autobots. The Autobots request a Ground Bridge transport at the same time as Starscream. Hence, the two Ground Bridges appear at once, causing a malfunction that leaves Jack, Miko and Rafael in a parallel dimension, along with the revived but zombified body of Skyquake. It's up to the kids to somehow communicate with the Autobots and return to their home dimension.
16	16	"Operation: Breakdown"	Shaunt Nigoghossian	Steven Melching	June 18, 2011	116
During a fight with Bulkhead in an abandoned town, Breakdown is captured by M.E.C.H., who wish to dismantle him and research his inner workings for a project they refer to as "Project: Chimera". Optimus Prime and Starscream lead separate rescue missions to save Breakdown.
17	17	"Crisscross"	Vinton Heuck	Joseph Kuhr	June 25, 2011	117
Airachnid, seeking retaliation on Arcee and Jack following their last encounter, teams up with M.E.C.H. in a plot to kidnap Jack's mother, June, intending to use her as bait to lure Jack and Arcee to M.E.C.H.'s hideout, so Arcee can be captured and used in M.E.C.H.'s experiments.
18	18	"Metal Attraction"	Todd Waterman	Nicole Dubuc	July 9, 2011	118
Bulkhead and Arcee, with Miko tagging along, are sent on a reconnaissance mission to investigate a bizarre energy signal in the desert. They discover that the signal is coming from a Polarity Gauntlet, a weapon that manipulates magnetic fields. However, they soon come into conflict with Breakdown and Airachnid, who both want the Gauntlet for themselves. In the end, though, Arcee and Bulkhead are successful while Breakdown returns to Megatron empty handed aside from Airachnid, who rejoins the Decepticons.
19	19	"Rock Bottom"	Shaunt Nigoghossian	Tim Jones	July 16, 2011	119
Bulkhead, Arcee, Jack and Miko investigate an old Decepticon Energon mine that was supposedly stripped clean. Megatron and Starscream arrive shortly after, with the former accusing the latter of hoarding Energon. Interrupted before he can commit murder by Jack and Arcee, Megatron opens fire and collapses the mine, burying everyone inside, and Bulkhead must rescue Miko before she runs out of oxygen.
20	20	"Partners"	Vinton Heuck	Mike Johnson	July 23, 2011	120
Megatron sends Starscream and Airachnid to the site of a crashed Decepticon ship to recover the Immobilizer, a powerful weapon with the ability to freeze Transformers in their tracks. But after the Autobots discover that Starscream has been double-crossed by Airachnid, they are surprised when Starscream states that he wishes to join them...: Note: This episode is dedicated to the memory of Captain H.L. Larry Cullen (Peter Cullen's older brother who helped inspire Optimus Prime's voice), who died in March 2011.
21	21	"T.M.I."	Todd Waterman	Joseph Kuhr	September 10, 2011	121
During a fight between the Autobots and the Decepticons over a Data Cylinder, a device containing knowledge of Cybertronian society, Miko rushes out to help and attempts to push the Cylinder into an open Ground Bridge. Instead, she accidentally activates it, which downloads all of its information - in this case the formula for a Synthetic Energon - into Bulkhead's brain. Soon, Bulkhead begins to rhyme off the complicated formula, painting the equation on the walls, and Miko becomes scared when her friend's personality and memories begin to slip away.
22	22	"Stronger, Faster"	Shaunt Nigoghossian	Mairghread Scott	September 17, 2011	122
Ratchet tests the Synthetic Energon formula obtained by Bulkhead from the Data Cylinder on various engines. Feeling the desire to take a more active role in the missions, he injects himself with the formula. At first the results are positive, with the formula greatly increasing Ratchet's strength, speed and agility. But before long, the formula starts to have negative effects on his personality.
23	23	"One Shall Fall"	Vinton Heuck	Duane Capizzi & Joseph Kuhr	September 24, 2011	123
Optimus Prime recites a passage from the Covenant of Primus, detailing a doomsday prophecy connected to Earth and involving Megatron. After Megatron attacks Rafael and Bumblebee, leaving Rafael unconscious and severely injured, Optimus realizes that he can't end the Autobot-Decepticon conflict diplomatically, and decides to confront Megatron and destroy him once and for all.: Debuts: Unicron
24	24	"One Shall Rise, Part 1"	Todd Waterman	Nicole Dubuc & Duane Capizzi	October 1, 2011	124
Unicron the Chaos-Bringer, an evil ancient being, awakens from the center of the Earth after millennia of stasis, causing an epidemic of natural disasters across the globe, and sending Dark Energon erupting from volcanoes. Optimus explains the history of Unicron and his battle with Primus, deducing that Unicron is actually the Earth's core, while Megatron attempts to pledge his allegiance to the Chaos-Bringer.
25	25	"One Shall Rise, Part 2"	Shaunt Nigoghossian	Marsha Griffin	October 8, 2011	125
After assisting the Autobots in a fight against an army of Unicron's stone avatars, Megatron forms an uneasy alliance with his enemies to defeat Unicron and save the Earth from destruction. The Autobots and Megatron then travel to the Earth's core, planning to send Unicron back into stasis using the Matrix of Leadership.
26	26	"One Shall Rise, Part 3"	Vinton Heuck	Steven Melching	October 15, 2011	126
While Ratchet tells Jack and the other humans about Optimus Prime's history on Cybertron, the battle begins at the Earth's core, with Megatron and the Autobots battling against Unicron's bat-like anti-bodies to reach the Chaos-Bringer's spark chamber.

=== Season 2 (2012) ===
No. overall	No. in season	Title	Directed by	Written by	U.S. original air date	Prod. code
27	1	"Orion Pax, Part 1"	Vinton Heuck	Nicole Dubuc	February 18, 2012	201
Optimus Prime loses all memory of being a Prime after using the Matrix of Leadership to send Unicron back into stasis. Megatron takes advantage of this and takes "Orion"(Optimus's name before becoming a Prime) on to the Nemesis, convincing him the Decepticons are good and the Autobots are evil (Before becoming a Prime, Optimus and Megatron were close friends). The Autobots are distraught at this turn of events, and upon discovering that Jack has the Key to Vector Sigma (an ancient super-computer containing infinite knowledge), they devise a plan to get their leader back.
28	2	"Orion Pax, Part 2"	Scooter Tidwell	Mairghread Scott	February 25, 2012	202
With the help of information from Starscream, the Autobots commandeer the Decepticons' space bridge to send Jack and Arcee to the Transformers' home world of Cybertron, with a plan to use the information stored in Vector Sigma to restore Optimus' memories. Meanwhile, after a run-in with Starscream (whom Megatron claimed was dead), Orion wonders if Megatron is telling him the whole truth.: Debuts: Insecticons
29	3	"Orion Pax, Part 3"	Shaunt Nigoghossian	Joseph Kuhr	March 3, 2012	203
On Cybertron, while searching for Vector Sigma, Jack and Arcee are attacked by an Insecticon and a swarm of Scraplets. On the Nemesis, Orion becomes ever more curious about who he really is, so he begins to rebel against Megatron and uncover the elaborate lies put in front of him. Later, Megatron distracted by Arcee fails to prevent Jack from endowing the knowledge acquired from the Vector Sigma, and Optimus regains his lost memory but loses what he had acquired during his stay on the Nemesis.: Final Appearance: Scraplets
30	4	"Operation: Bumblebee, Part 1"	Todd Waterman	Marty Isenberg	March 10, 2012	204
The hunt begins for ancient Cybertronian relics hidden on Earth. One such relic is unearthed by Megatron and the Decepticons, which is revealed to be the Spark Extractor during the ensuing conflict. Later, while investigating an energy signature which could be another relic, Bumblebee is ambushed by M.E.C.H., who knock him out and steal his T-cog (the device that enables Transformers to scan alternate modes and transform). Left unable to transform into vehicle mode, Bumblebee has no choice but to stay at base. Dissatisfied with that option, he and Bulkhead secretly investigate another energy signature, which leads to an escaping Knock Out and Breakdown, the former of which had just acquired a relic from a cave, the Shield Generator. An improvised chase follows. Meanwhile, Starscream approaches Silas (the leader of M.E.C.H.) and offers advice and knowledge on Cybertronian anatomy.: Final Appearance: Sierra
31	5	"Operation: Bumblebee, Part 2"	Vinton Heuck	Nicole Dubuc	March 17, 2012	205
Still feeling guilty about failing to repair Bumblebee's voice box during the war, Ratchet offers to give Bumblebee his own T-cog via transplant. While Optimus, Bulkhead and Arcee are out retrieving another Iacon relic, the Forge of Solus Prime, Agent Fowler calls the base with news about newly discovered coordinates of a M.E.C.H. hideout. Seeing an opportunity, Bumblebee storms the hideout to get his T-cog back.
32	6	"Loose Cannons"	Scooter Tidwell	David McDermott	March 24, 2012	206
Wheeljack returns to Earth in pursuit of the Decepticon Dreadwing, Skyquake's twin brother who is responsible for the death of the Wrecker Seaspray, and asks for Team Prime's help in apprehending him. While Bulkhead is excited about seeing his best friend again, Optimus Prime soon becomes concerned with Wheeljack's recklessness, aggression, and disregard for civilians during their search for Dreadwing.: Debuts: Dreadwing and Seaspray; Deaths: Seaspray
33	7	"Crossfire"	Shaunt Nigoghossian	Marty Isenberg	March 31, 2012	207
Megatron sends Breakdown, Airachnid and Dreadwing in search of Energon in a forest, with Airachnid unaware that her comrades have actually been ordered to terminate her for treason. She catches on to the plan and flees, killing Breakdown in the process, and upon encountering a lone Insecticon, she uses her abilities to control it, and challenges Megatron to a fight to the death, but not before having it attack Starscream. Starscream passes on the Insecticon's presence on Earth, leading to the Autobots becoming involved and another face-off between Arcee and Airachnid.: Deaths: Breakdown
34	8	"Nemesis Prime"	Todd Waterman	David McDermott	April 7, 2012	208
M.E.C.H. produces a clone of Optimus Prime (which Miko off-handedly names Nemesis Prime) and sets it loose on a military base, where it wreaks havoc. The United States Military immediately attributes the chaos to the real Optimus, and order the Autobots be shot on sight. While Agent Fowler tries to convince his superiors that Optimus did not attack the base, Team Prime tries to track down Nemesis Prime and clear their names.: Debuts/Deaths: Nemesis Prime; Note: The music playing on Fowler's car radio is a remix of the song "The Touch" by singer/guitarist Stan Bush.
35	9	"Grill"	Kevin Altieri	Duane Capizzi	April 14, 2012	209
Agent Fowler is forced to explain recent events to his superior, General Bryce. Threatened with a military tribunal and Team Prime's termination, Fowler tries to convince Bryce that the Autobots are still on the military's side, but Bryce believes that Optimus went rogue and has perished, failing to fully understand that Nemesis Prime was not the real Optimus.: Debuts: General Bryce
36	10	"Armada"	Vinton Heuck	Matt Wayne	April 21, 2012	210
Bulkhead accidentally becomes trapped on board the Nemesis while on a scouting mission, and tries to escape without being discovered. Meanwhile, Starscream and Airachnid send their newly-gained armies (Starscream's being five clones of himself, and Airachnid's being a hive of Insecticons) to the Nemesis, both intending to kill Megatron.: Debuts/Deaths: Starscream clones
37	11	"Flying Mind"	Scooter Tidwell	Robert N. Skir	April 28, 2012	211
The Nemesis crashes on a mountainside with its engines badly damaged. Megatron attempts to restart the engines with Dark Energon, which works, but has an unexpected side effect: the ship develops a mind of its own and rebels against its own crew. With the ship flying out of control and both the Autobots and Decepticons frozen in stasis, Jack, Miko, Rafael, and Agent Fowler are left as the only ones who can stop its rampage.
38	12	"Tunnel Vision"	Shaunt Nigoghossian	Andrew R. Robinson	May 5, 2012	212
Having discovered the locations of four Iacon relics hidden across the globe, Team Prime splits up into small groups and head to each location simultaneously to retrieve them. Arcee, Bumblebee, Jack and Miko travel to New York City to find the first relic, the Phase Shifter (a device that enables its user to walk through solid objects), which is buried deep in the city's underground subway tunnels. During their search, Arcee and Bumblebee are attacked by Knock Out and an Insecticon, while Jack and Miko run into a maintenance worker and try to prevent him seeing the Transformers.
39	13	"Triangulation"	Todd Waterman	David McDermott	May 12, 2012	213
Optimus Prime heads to Antarctica to look for the second Iacon relic, the Apex Armor, a full-body suit of indestructible armor that expands from a small disc. He forces a rogue Starscream (Who's curious as to why the Decepticons are dispatching teams to four continents) at gunpoint to lead him to it. Trouble arises when Dreadwing arrives, who is also searching for the relic and attempting to bring Starscream back to Megatron for interrogation. The Decepticon is forced to join forces with the leader of the Autobots when Starscream acquires the Apex Armor in a bid to avoid being executed by either of them.
40	14	"Triage"	Vinton Heuck	Marty Isenberg	May 19, 2012	214
Ratchet reluctantly calls upon Wheeljack for back-up in his mission to retrieve the third Iacon relic, a sonic weapon called the Resonance Blaster. On their way to the location, the two Autobots are attacked by Soundwave, but Wheeljack manages to shoot down and disable Soundwave's surveillance drone Laserbeak, which gives Ratchet an idea. While Wheeljack and Soundwave fight over the Resonance Blaster, Ratchet tells Rafael to upload a virus into Laserbeak's systems that will download the entire Iacon Database into the Autobot base's computers without the Decepticons noticing.
41	15	"Toxicity"	Scooter Tidwell	Steven Melching	May 26, 2012	215
Bulkhead goes to a volcanic island on the Equator to find the fourth and final Iacon relic. But to his horror, he discovers that the relic is a piece of Tox-En, a form of highly toxic Energon that is lethal to Transformers. He tries to dispose of the Tox-En by throwing it into a volcano, but it deteriorates his strength, and things are made worse when a group of Insecticons led by Hardshell arrive in search of the relic.: Debuts: Hardshell
42	16	"Hurt"	Shaunt Nigoghossian	Mairghread Scott	August 24, 2012	216
Bulkhead is left in a critical condition and on the verge of death after his fight with the Insecticons and exposure to Tox-En. Distraught about what has happened to their friend, Miko and Wheeljack head out to find Hardshell and get revenge.: Deaths: Hardshell
43	17	"Out of the Past"	Todd Waterman	Mike Johnson	August 31, 2012	217
Miko becomes frustrated with Bulkhead's slow recovery and storms out of the base. Finding Miko weeping by herself, Arcee tries to cheer her up by telling the story of how she and her last battle partner Cliffjumper first came to Earth. Starscream had captured Arcee and Cliffjumper and took them to be interrogated by the Decepticon scientist Shockwave, and upon escaping they discover Shockwave's plan to build a space bridge to Earth.: Debuts: Shockwave; Final Appearance: Tailgate (Flashback)
44	18	"New Recruit"	Vinton Heuck	Marty Isenberg	September 7, 2012	218
During a fight with the Decepticons, Team Prime is unexpectedly aided by Smokescreen, a young and impulsive Autobot. Despite Arcee and Ratchet's distrust in the newcomer, Optimus Prime invites Smokescreen to the base for further training. Meanwhile, Starscream discovers that a meteorite of Red Energon (which grants the consumer enhanced speed) has crashed on Earth, and sets out to claim it for himself.: Debuts: Smokescreen
45	19	"The Human Factor"	Scooter Tidwell	Robert N. Skir	September 14, 2012	219
M.E.C.H. scientists implant the dying Colonel Leland Bishop (aka Silas) into a battle armor and life-support system made from Breakdown's dead body. Silas kills the scientists and approaches Megatron, introducing himself as C.Y.L.A.S. (Cybernetic Life Augmented by Symbiosis), asking for a position in the Decepticon ranks and offering to aid their cause with Project: Damocles, a satellite-based laser weapon system of his own invention.: Deaths: M.E.C.H. soldiers
46	20	"Legacy"	Shaunt Nigoghossian	Marsha Griffin	September 21, 2012	220
Optimus Prime gives Jack the task of helping Smokescreen learn about human society and adapt to living on Earth. The Decepticons detect another Iacon relic, the legendary Star Saber, and Megatron sends out a set of decoy coordinates to distract the Autobots, so he can claim the Star Saber for himself.: Final Appearance: Vince
47	21	"Alpha Omega"	Todd Waterman	David McDermott	September 28, 2012	221
Optimus Prime discovers that the Star Saber is embedded with a message from his former mentor Alpha Trion. In this message, Alpha Trion explains about four Iacon relics called the Omega Keys, which when brought together are able to make Cybertron inhabitable again. Meanwhile, Megatron opens the tomb of one of the late thirteen original Prime on Cybertron, taking an arm and having it attached to him so he can use the Forge of Solus Prime to build a weapon from Dark Energon strong enough to counter the Star Saber.: Debuts: Alpha Trion
48	22	"Hard Knocks"	Vinton Heuck	Mairghread Scott	October 5, 2012	222
Team Prime continue to collect the Omega Keys, but the Decepticons (who are unaware of what the keys can do, but are curious about Team Prime's determination to have them) out-smart them at every turn. After Smokescreen storms out of the base, blaming himself for the team's failure to obtain the keys, the decoded coordinates of the final key reveal it is inside Smokescreen's body. The Autobots head out to warn him, but he is captured by Soundwave and Laserbeak.
49	23	"Inside Job"	Scooter Tidwell	Robert N. Skir	October 12, 2012	223
With Smokescreen being held captive and interrogated on board the Nemesis, Knock Out uses the Phase Shifter to remove the fourth Omega Key from within his body. Breaking free from his restraints by stealing the former relic back, Smokescreen sets about retrieving two of the keys, as well as escaping the ship. Though he is successful, Starscream uses Red Energon to gain hyper-speed and sneaks into the Autobot base to steal all four keys for himself.
50	24	"Patch"	Shaunt Nigoghossian	Duane Capizzi	October 19, 2012	224
Starscream approaches Megatron with all four Omega Keys, having stolen them from the Autobot base, and proposes a truce to rejoin the Decepticons. Megatron suspects that Starscream is up to something, and orders Knock Out to set up a cortical psychic patch so he can determine his true intentions, this leads Dreadwing to realize that his twin Skyquake fell under Starscream's command and that the latter resurrected him as a Terrorcon.
51	25	"Regeneration"	Todd Waterman	Marsha Griffin	October 26, 2012	225
Disillusioned with the Decepticon cause for letting Starscream back to their ranks, Dreadwing offers the Forge of Solus Prime to the Autobots. He then seeks revenge on Starscream for desecrating his twin, but Megatron kills him to reluctantly save Starscream. As Megatron subsequently unleashes his forces on Cybertron, Optimus Prime uses the Forge to upgrade the ground bridge into a space bridge. Armed with every Iacon relic they have, the Autobots head to Cybertron to find the Omega Lock, the device needed to restore Cybertron with the Omega Keys.: Deaths: Dreadwing
52	26	"Darkest Hour"	Vinton Heuck	Steven Melching	November 2, 2012	226
Megatron activates the Omega Lock and starts restoring Cybertron, but he then reveals he is also going to use the Lock's power to turn Earth into a mechanical planet - which would kill all of its inhabitants. Optimus Prime destroys the Lock before it can finish its restoration, saving Earth but dooming Cybertron. The Autobots retreat back to Earth, only to find a gigantic fortress has appeared outside their base - which makes it clear that the Decepticons have finally discovered the base's location.: Debuts: Seekers

=== Season 3: Beast Hunters (2013) ===
No. overall	No. in season	Title	Directed by	Written by	U.S. original air date	Prod. code
53	1	"Darkmount, NV"	Shaunt Nigoghossian	Marsha Griffin	March 22, 2013	301
With their base destroyed, the Autobots and their human companions have separated and gone into hiding, while the Decepticons send their forces to hunt down and destroy them. Meanwhile, Optimus struggles to survive after being injured during Megatron's attack on Earth.
54	2	"Scattered"	Vinton Heuck	Steven Melching	March 29, 2013	302
As the Autobots try to re-group, Shockwave arrives in Darkmount after years of isolation on Cybertron, and is welcomed back into the Decepticon ranks. Wheeljack escapes from Darkmount and sets off to rendezvous with Bulkhead and Miko, unaware that Starscream has planted a tracking device on him.: Debuts: Commander Ultra Magnus and Predaking; Final Appearance: Cliffjumper (Flashback)
55	3	"Prey"	Todd Waterman	Marsha Griffin	April 5, 2013	303
After Starscream's armada fails to apprehend Wheeljack, Shockwave introduces Predaking, an enormous reptilian dragon creature created in Shockwave's laboratory and specially bred to hunt down Autobots. Meanwhile, high-ranking Autobot general Ultra Magnus arrives on Earth and sets about reuniting the scattered members of Team Prime.
56	4	"Rebellion"	Scooter Tidwell	Steven Melching	April 12, 2013	304
The Autobots attack Darkmount in an attempt to disable its firepower to allow human military to destroy it. As Optimus prepares to join with the AllSpark, Smokescreen uses the Forge to repair him, and makes him a new, more powerful body. Optimus joins the Autobots at Darkmount and, with human support, destroys the fortress.: Final Appearances: Decepticon Miners and Alpha Trion; Deaths: Optimus Prime (revived)
57	5	"Project Predacon"	Shaunt Nigoghossian	Duane Capizzi	May 17, 2013	305
The Autobots adjust to new group dynamics within their expanded team and Optimus Prime scans a new vehicle form, but Smokescreen privately starts to regret not becoming a Prime. The Decepticons, having found fossilized Predacon bones on Earth, launch a scheme to clone an army of Predacons through the same method that created Predaking.: Debuts: Bombshock
58	6	"Chain of Command"	Vinton Heuck	Mairghread Scott	May 24, 2013	306
Ultra Magnus, Wheeljack, Bulkhead and Miko are in the wilderness of The Hebrides Bluffs in Scotland investigating a Decepticon excavation site for Predacon fossils, but tension builds between the group as Wheeljack acts recklessly and ignores Magnus's commands. On the Nemesis, Starscream is given the task of training Predaking, but he struggles to get the uncooperative beast to follow orders. Meanwhile, Miko gets her hands on the Apex Armor.
59	7	"Plus One"	Todd Waterman	Greg Weisman	May 31, 2013	307
While Arcee and Wheeljack are on a mission to gather a Predacon bone, Agent Fowler and June collect another bone in storage at a museum. As they leave, Knock Out captures them and holds them hostage in the trunk of his vehicle mode, but soon finds that he is unable to call for a Ground Bridge because the communications systems on the Nemesis are damaged by Predaking.
60	8	"Thirst"	Scooter Tidwell	Marsha Griffin	June 7, 2013	308
Knock Out is researching Ratchet's incomplete Synthetic Energon formula, using C.Y.L.A.S., still implanted within Breakdown's corpse, as a test subject. Starscream suggests injecting him with Dark Energon to make him easier to control. However, the mixture instead turns him into a vampiric Terrorcon craving fresh Energon, wandering the ship and infecting other crew members. In the end, C.Y.L.A.S. is killed by Airachnid, who then attempts a mutiny with the Insecticons only to be transported off-world through a spacebridge portal by Soundwave.: Deaths: Silas/C.Y.L.A.S.; Final appearances: Airachnid and Insecticons; Note: This is the only episode not to feature the Autobots.
61	9	"Evolution"	Shaunt Nighoghossian	Steven Melching	June 28, 2013	309
The Predacon army is almost fully grown and ready for deployment, but Predaking suddenly surprises everyone by revealing he is able to transform and is more intelligent than first thought. Despite Predaking pledging his loyalty, Megatron still worries that he will eventually lead the Predacons to rebel against the Decepticons, so he plans to terminate Project: Predacon by leading the Autobots to the laboratory and having them unwittingly destroy the clones for them.
62	10	"Minus One"	Vinton Heuck	Michael Cassutt	July 5, 2013	310
Having discovered that the combination of Predacon CNA and Synthetic Energon creates raw cyber-matter (the substance Cybertron is made of), the Decepticons plan to repair the Omega Lock, restore Cybertron and cyberform Earth through this process. While gathering equipment for the project, Soundwave is captured by the Autobots, who take him to their base and try to interrogate him about Megatron's plans, but he deletes all of his information and shuts himself down. Laserbeak eventually finds the base and re-activates Soundwave, who proceeds to capture Ratchet.
63	11	"Persuasion"	Todd Waterman	Michael G. Stern	July 12, 2013	311
The Decepticons hold Ratchet captive, and Megatron attempts to persuade him to help complete the Synthetic Energon formula and restore Cybertron. Rafael and Wheeljack build a flying drone and attach Laserbeak's transponder (which Smokescreen shot off) to it, in the hope that Laserbeak's navigation systems will lead the Autobots to Ratchet so they can rescue him.: Debuts: Chip
64	12	"Synthesis"	Scooter Tidwell	Marsha Griffin	July 19, 2013	312
Ratchet reluctantly agrees to help the Decepticons perfect the Synthetic Energon formula, but he sabotages the project and tries to escape from the Nemesis. The Autobots launch their drone and Optimus Prime follows it, but is confronted by Starscream and the drone is destroyed. Megatron leaves Ratchet at the mercy of the vengeful Predaking, but Ratchet helps the Predacon realize that the Decepticons were behind the destruction of his army. Predaking attacks Megatron but is ejected from the ship, giving Ratchet enough time to contact the Autobots and provide the ship's location.: Deaths: Chip; Note: This episode is dedicated to the memory of Armen Mirzaian (one of the series' storyboard artists) who lost his life in a car accident in February 2013.
65	13	"Deadlock"	Shaunt Nigoghossian	Steven Melching	July 26, 2013	313
The Autobots storm the Nemesis and try to reach the Omega Lock before the Decepticons can activate it and cyberform Earth. As the other Autobots fight off the Decepticon army, Jack, Miko, and Raf trap Soundwave in the Shadowzone, Optimus Prime and Megatron engage in a final showdown. During their clash, Megatron fatally shoots Bumblebee, but the scout is revived by the Omega Lock's Cyber Matter and kills Megatron, regaining his voice. Starscream and Shockwave escape, and the Autobots restore Cybertron. Saying farewell to their human allies and Ratchet, who decided to remain behind, the Autobots leave Earth to begin rebuilding their home.: Deaths: Megatron and Bumblebee (revived); Final appearances: Soundwave, Laserbeak, Jack Darby, Rafael Esquievel, Miko Nakadai, William Fowler, June Darby, and Seekers

=== TV movie ===
No.	Title	Directed by	Written by	U.S. original air date
TV	"Transformers Prime Beast Hunters: Predacons Rising"	Vinton Heuck, Scooter Tidwell, and Todd Waterman	Duane Capizzi, Marsha Griffin, and Steven Melching	October 4, 2013
Unicron has taken over Megatron's body to get revenge on the Autobots and destroy Cybertron, and it is up to the Autobots, the Decepticons and the Predacons to form an alliance to stop him.: Debuts: Darksteel and Skylynx; Final Appearances: Optimus Prime, Bumblebee, Arcee, Bulkhead, Wheeljack, Ultra Magnus, Smokescreen, Ratchet, Megatron, Shockwave, Starscream, Knockout, Vehicons, Unicron, Predaking, Darksteel and Skylynx; Deaths: Optimus Prime
