= Transformers: Prime – The Game =

2012 video game

- Developers: Now Production (Wii, Wii U, 3DS); Altron (DS)
- Publisher: Activision
- Directors: Tatsuo Isoko; Masatoshi Ogita
- Producer: Tatsuo Isoko
- Designers: Shoji Terai; Takeshi Mizutani
- Programmer: Naoyuki Ohtsuka
- Artists: Yukiya Matsuura; Hideyuki Kawauchi
- Writer: Dan Jolley
- Platforms: Wii, Nintendo DS, Nintendo 3DS, Wii U
- Release: Wii, Nintendo DS, Nintendo 3DS: NA: October 30, 2012; AU: October 31, 2012; EU: November 2, 2012; Wii U: NA: November 18, 2012; AU: November 30, 2012; EU: November 30, 2012
- Genre: Brawler
- Modes: Single-player, multiplayer

Transformers: Prime – The Game is a brawler video game based on the Transformers: Prime animated series, itself based on the Transformers franchise. It was developed by Now Production, published by Activision, and released for the Wii, Wii U, Nintendo 3DS, and Nintendo DS in October–November 2012. The game's main storyline sees the Autobots on Earth, referred to as "Team Prime" and consisting of Optimus Prime, Arcee, Bulkhead, Bumblebee, and Ratchet, along with their human companions Jack Darby, Miko Nakadai, and Rafael "Raf" Esquivel, once again facing off against their rivals, the Decepticons, led by Megatron, and attempting to stop them from freeing an ancient and powerful Transformer known as Thunderwing.

== Gameplay ==
The gameplay has been described as containing "brawler-style combat and diverse driving sequences". There is a multiplayer function, both cooperative and competitive. Competitive modes include Brawl, Energon Match, and Emblem Battle, and up to 2 players can play at the same time, with 2 additional AI-controlled characters; the same character can't be selected by multiple players, including the AIs. The Wii version of the game featured motion controls while the Nintendo Wii U, 3DS and Nintendo DS featured touch-based input.

The game's Story Mode features 13 stages, each with a varying number of segments. Though only the Autobot characters are playable in this mode, progressing through it unlocks the Decepticon characters for the multiplayer mode. There are a total of 11 playable characters: the Autobots Optimus Prime, Arcee, Bulkhead, Bumblebee, and Ratchet, and the Decepticons Megatron, Starscream, Soundwave, Airachnid, Knock Out, and Dreadwing. Cybertronian Artifacts - relics resembling the Spark Extractor from the TV series - are hidden around the story mode levels and unlock pieces of artwork in the gallery once found.

== Plot ==
The Decepticons intercept a mysterious meteor composed entirely of Dark Energon approaching the Earth, which they anchor to their flagship, the Nemesis. The Autobots arrive to thwart their plans, and Optimus manages to destroy the machinery tethering the asteroid, before engaging Megatron in a one-on-one fight. During the battle, a massive eruption of power on the meteor breaks out, which shatters into numerous pieces, separating the Autobots. Megatron orders his minions to hunt them down, while Ratchet, Jack, Miko, and Raf track down their missing comrades and split up, using their Ground Bridge to travel to various locations around the Earth where they landed.

Arcee awakens at a factory outside Jasper, Nevada, where she encounters Airachnid and her Insecticon swarm, who have kidnapped Jack. Though she saves Jack following a chase, Airachnid is able to escape. Elsewhere, Bulkhead is found by Miko in an underground temple in the desert, moments before Starscream finds them as well. After escaping from the collapsing temple, Bulkhead fights his way through Vehicons and ultimately defeats Starscream at some ancient ruins, though he then escapes with Miko. Meanwhile, Bumblebee finds himself taken prisoner at a Decepticon Energon mine, until Raf arrives and breaks him out. The pair then make their way out of the mine, fighting Vehicons and Knock Out, but Raf is kidnapped in the process. At the same time, Ratchet finds Optimus next to a piece of the meteor holding the massive Thunderwing, an ancient Cybertronian and disciple of Unicron, whose sole purpose is to destroy the Autobot Matrix of Leadership. Optimus briefly battles and weakens Thunderwing, before the Decepticons arrive, forcing Optimus and Ratchet to flee. While the former is able to escape through a Ground Bridge, Ratchet is captured by the Decepticons, who also retrieve Thunderwing. In exchange for his freedom and the Matrix, Megatron asks Thunderwing to swear his allegiance to him. After Thunderwing reluctantly agrees to the deal, Megatron forces Ratchet to fix him, and begins a hunt for pieces of Cybertronian technology scattered around the Earth, needed to restore Thunderwing to full power.

The Autobots focus on saving Miko, Raf, and Ratchet, and send Bumblebee and Arcee to investigate Decepticon presence in a canyon. They encounter and pursue Dreadwing, who is ultimately defeated and buried him under some rocks by Bumblebee. He then discovers that Dreadwing was searching for one of Thunderwing's components, which is stolen by Soundwave before the Autobots can claim it. Elsewhere, Optimus and Bulkhead encounter Megatron and Starscream at some ruins, who are looking for another one of Thunderwing's components. Megatron makes off with it after a fight with Optimus, who pursues him, but is ultimately lured into a trap buried under some rocks. Shortly after, Bulkhead, having taken Starscream hostage, infiltrates the Nemesis via Ground Bridge, creating a distraction that allows Ratchet to escape. After rescuing Miko and Raf, the trio fight their way to the ship's control room, where Ratchet defeats Soundwave, chasing him away. Afterwards, he is able to inform the other Autobots of their whereabouts, so Arcee and Bumblebee arrive on the Nemesis via Ground Bridge, and defeat Airachnid and Knock Out, respectively. Meanwhile, Bulkhead is led into an ambush by Starscream, but survives and defeats Starscream, chasing him away. After Megatron and Starscream restore Thunderwing to full power, he betrays them, claiming that his loyalty belongs only to Unicron, and leaves to destroy the Matrix of Leadership, damaging the Nemesis in the process, while the Autobots make their escape.

With Optimus still missing, the Autobots track down Thunderwing to an active Dark Energon volcano plain and head there to confront him, but are attacked by Megatron. Optimus then arrives via Ground Bridge and defeats Megatron, before Thunderwing shows up to destroy the Matrix of Leadership in Optimus' possession, seemingly killing Megatron in the process. While Optimus struggles against Thunderwing, Arcee and Jack arrive with an experimental device created by Ratchet, which weakens Thunderwing enough for Optimus to defeat him using the power of the Matrix, which sends him plunging into a pool of lava that destroys him for good. Afterwards, Optimus holds a monlogue, vowing to continue protecting Earth from the Decepticons and any other future threat.

== Development and marketing ==
Artwork for Transformers: Prime – The Game was unveiled at the 2012 New York Toy Fair in February. A debut trailer was released shortly after, in March. A second trailer, displaying cutscenes from the game was revealed to the public two months later, in May. Most of the voice cast from the show reprise their rolls in the game, except Tony Todd who was replaced by Fred Tatasciore as Dreadwing, and Robin Atkin Downes voices Thunderwing.

== Reception ==
Reception

Aggregate score
Aggregator	Score
Metacritic	3DS: 72/100; Wii: 66/100; Wii U: 56/100

The game received fairly positive reviews. IGN gave the Wii U version a 7.8/10.
