= Transformers Prime Beast Hunters: Predacons Rising =

2013 television film

- DVD Release cover
- Genre: Action
- Based on: Transformers: Prime
- Written by: Duane Capizzi; Marsha Griffin; Steven Melching
- Directed by: Vinton Heuck; Scooter Tidwell; Todd Waterman
- Starring: Peter Cullen; John Noble; Frank Welker; Nolan North; Daran Norris; Steve Blum; Kevin Michael Richardson; David Sobolov; Sumalee Montano; Will Friedle; Jeffrey Combs; Michael Ironside; James Horan; Peter Mensah
- Theme music composer: Brian Tyler
- Country of origin: United States
- Original language: English

Production
- Producers: Alex Kurtzman; Roberto Orci
- Editor: Michael William Miles
- Running time: 65 minutes
- Production companies: Hasbro Studios; K/O Paper Products; Darby Pop Productions

Original release
- Network: Hub Network
- Release: October 4, 2013

Transformers Prime Beast Hunters: Predacons Rising is a 2013 American animated action adventure television film that concludes the Transformers: Prime television series. It was first broadcast on Hub Network on October 4, 2013. After the Autobots' victory on Earth, Unicron returns in possession of Megatron's body with the intent on destroying Cybertron, forcing Autobots, Decepticons, and Predacons to form an unlikely alliance to counter this threat.

== Plot ==
External videos
- Transformers Prime Beast Hunters: Predacons Rising | FULL FILM | Animation | Transformers Official — Official upload of the film onto YouTube

Not long after Megatron's demise and the restoration of Cybertron, the Autobots celebrate as Optimus Prime knights Bumblebee a warrior. Optimus and Wheeljack embark on a journey to find the AllSpark, the source of Cybertronian life, leaving the other Autobots to hunt down the missing Decepticons Shockwave and Starscream. Meanwhile, at the bottom of the Pacific Ocean, Megatron is revived and possessed by Unicron, intending to destroy Cybertron. While searching for Shockwave and Starscream, Ultra Magnus and Smokescreen are attacked by their Predacon creations Skylynx and Darksteel, forcing Ratchet to return to Cybertron to tend to the critically wounded Magnus.

Bumblebee, Smokescreen, Bulkhead, and Arcee track down Predaking in an attempt to find the new Predacons, but Predaking refuses to help them. After Bumblebee's team heads to Megatron's old fortress in Kaon on the imprisoned Knock Out's suggestion, they are confronted by Unicron and are forced to escape. Meanwhile, in the Theta Scorpii asteroid belt, Optimus and Wheeljack find the AllSpark's container, which Optimus retrieves as they begin their return trip to Cybertron. With Ultra Magnus wounded in action and Optimus unable to communicate with them, Bumblebee assumes temporary leadership of the Autobots.

Predaking begins searching for Skylynx and Darksteel, but finds Unicron instead. After easily defeating him, Unicron encounters Shockwave, Starscream, Darksteel, and Skylynx harvesting bones from a massive Predacon graveyard. Unicron overpowers Skylynx and Darksteel and resurrects the ancient corpses into undead Terrorcons; Starscream flees while Shockwave is injured by the Terrorcons. As the undead horde heads for the Well of All Sparks, the Autobots prepare to fight back while Ratchet stays behind with Ultra Magnus. Starscream sneaks on board the Nemesis and frees Knock Out and the captive Vehicon troops but Knock Out defects and incapacitates Starscream before he can commandeer the ship and flee Cybertron. Predaking finds Skylynx and Darksteel at the Predacon graveyard, and the resulting brawl is interrupted by a wounded Shockwave, who suggests that they assist the Autobots. Unicron's undead army is confronted by the Nemesis and the Predacons at the Well of AllSpark, but the ship is shot down as Starscream escapes.

Optimus and Wheeljack return, but Unicron shoots down Wheeljack's ship, defeats Optimus, and seemingly claims the AllSpark. However, his Anti-Spark is pulled into the empty container, sealing it away forever. The Terrorcons disintegrate and Megatron is freed. Having a change of heart, Megatron disbands the Decepticons and flies off to exile himself of Cybertron. Starscream then flies back to Darkmount to take command of the Decepticons only to be confronted by the Predacons.

Optimus reveals that he emptied the AllSpark into the Matrix of Leadership within him but can no longer be separated from either and must sacrifice himself to restore life to Cybertron. The Autobots try to dissuade him, but Optimus states that the Matrix cannot be restored again and asks that they continue to protect Cybertron. As the others vow to keep the peace, Optimus plunges into the planet's core, causing millions of sparks from deceased and unborn Transformers to emerge from the Well. The Autobots watch as Optimus's spark joins the multitude among the Well, while he narrates that his sacrifice marks a new beginning rather than the end.

== Cast ==
- Peter Cullen – Optimus Prime
- Frank Welker – Megatron & Terrorcons
- Will Friedle – Bumblebee
- Sumalee Montano – Arcee
- Steve Blum – Starscream & Darksteel
- Nolan North – Smokescreen & Skylynx
- Kevin Michael Richardson – Bulkhead
- Daran Norris – Knock Out
- James Horan – Wheeljack
- Peter Mensah – Predaking
- Jeffrey Combs – Ratchet
- Michael Ironside – Ultra Magnus
- David Sobolov – Shockwave
- John Noble – Unicron

== Release ==
The film first premiered on Hub Network on October 4, 2013, before being released by Shout! Factory on DVD and Blu-ray on October 8.

The film was uploaded to YouTube by the Transformers Official channel on November 29, 2023.

== Reception ==
Predacons Rising earned positive reviews with it being called a satisfying conclusion to the series but some criticized the under-use of some characters like Magnus and Shockwave.

== Crew ==
- Jamie Simone – Casting and Voice Director
