= Transformers: Prime =

2010–2013 animated television series

- Also known as: Transformers: Prime – Beast Hunters (season 3)
- Genre: Action-adventure; Science fiction; Drama
- Based on: Transformers by Hasbro and Takara Tomy
- Developed by: Roberto Orci; Alex Kurtzman; Duane Capizzi; Jeff Kline
- Voices of: Peter Cullen; Frank Welker; Jeffrey Combs; Ernie Hudson; Josh Keaton; Sumalee Montano; Daran Norris; Steve Blum; Kevin Michael Richardson; Tania Gunadi; Will Friedle; Andy Pessoa
- Opening theme: "Transformers: Prime" by Brian Tyler
- Ending theme: "Transformers: Prime" by Brian Tyler
- Composers: Brian Tyler; Matthew Margeson
- Country of origin: United States
- Original language: English
- No. of seasons: 3
- No. of episodes: 65 (list of episodes)

Production
- Executive producers: Roberto Orci; Alex Kurtzman; Jeff Kline; Stephen Davis
- Running time: 22 minutes
- Production companies: K/O Paper Products; Darby Pop Productions; Hasbro Studios

Original release
- Network: The Hub
- Release: November 26, 2010 – July 26, 2013

Related
- Transformers: Robots in Disguise (2015–2017); Transformers: Rescue Bots; Transformers: Rescue Bots Academy

Transformers: Prime (known as Transformers: Prime – Beast Hunters during its third and final season) is an American animated television series based on the Transformers toy franchise by Hasbro that aired on the Hub Network from November 26, 2010, to July 26, 2013. The series focuses on the Autobots of "Team Prime", consisting of Optimus Prime, Ratchet, Arcee, Bumblebee and Bulkhead, and their human allies as they attempt to protect the Earth from the villainous Decepticons and their leader Megatron.

Development of the series began in early 2010 with the announcement that Alex Kurtzman and Roberto Orci, screenwriters of the first two live-action films, would be creating the series. Casting began soon after with the announcement that Peter Cullen and Frank Welker would reprise their roles as Optimus Prime and Megatron, respectively. The series concluded on October 4, 2013, with the television film Transformers Prime Beast Hunters: Predacons Rising. A standalone sequel series following Bumblebee and a new cast of characters, titled Transformers: Robots in Disguise, premiered on March 14, 2015.

== Premise ==
Transformers Prime is set in the franchise's "Aligned" continuity, which also includes a number of contemporary books and video games like Transformers: Exodus, Transformers: War for Cybertron, Transformers: Rise of the Dark Spark, Transformers: Fall of Cybertron, Transformers: Exiles, and Transformers: Retribution. The series is notably the first work within this continuity to not focus on the Autobots and the Decepticons' war on their home planet of Cybertron (though glimpses of it are shown in various flashbacks), and instead takes place primarily on Earth during the modern era.

The series chronicles the adventures of an Autobot team known as "Team Prime" led by Optimus Prime and originally consisting of Arcee, Bumblebee, Bulkhead, Ratchet, and Cliffjumper (who is killed in the five-part pilot "Darkness Rising"). The team operates from a former American military missile silo near the fictional town of Jasper, Nevada, and tries to conceal their existence from humanity while continuing their fight against the Decepticons. The Autobots make several human allies throughout the series who agree to keep their secret, including high school students Jack Darby (and later his mother, nurse June Darby), Miko Nakadai, Rafael Esquivel, and American government agent William Fowler. In the second half of the series, more Autobots join Team Prime, including Bulkhead's friend and former teammate Wheeljack (who helped Team Prime several times during the first two seasons but did not officially join them until the third season), the ambitious rookie Smokescreen, and Optimus's chief lieutenant Ultra Magnus.

The Decepticons, led by Megatron and briefly by Starscream in the former's absence, operate from their warship, the Nemesis, and briefly from a base called Darkmount, which is built in the season two finale and then destroyed by the Autobots at the start of the third season. At first, Megatron, Starscream, and Soundwave (as well as his minion Laserbeak) are the only notable Decepticons, as they command a legion of identical drones called Vehicons. More Decepticons join the ranks over the course of the series, including the narcissistic medic Knock Out, his partner Breakdown (who shares a rivalry with Bulkhead), the sadistic murderer Airachnid (who is Arcee's nemesis due to their history), Insecticon hive leader Hardshell, (Note: The character is known as Bombshell in other continuities.) Seeker captain Dreadwing, and Decepticon scientist Shockwave.

The series brings several notable changes and additions to Transformers lore. For example, both the Autobots and Decepticons use Ground Bridges (scaled-down versions of the Space Bridges, which also appear) to travel across the Earth, and the ancient planet-sized Transformer Unicron serves as the planet's core, emphasizing the idea of Earth and Cybertron being "twin planets". The series also marks the first appearance of the necromantic Dark Energon, a more unstable and dangerous version of Energon (the substance that powers all Transformers), which can be used to bring the dead back to life as mindless zombies (called "Terrorcons"). In the third season, Predacons (Transformers who resemble dragon-like creatures) are introduced as the Transformers' ancestors, having gone extinct until they were recreated by Shockwave to serve the Decepticons. Initially, only one Predacon is created, Predaking, who later goes independent from the Decepticons upon learning that Megatron had ordered the destruction of his unborn siblings. Two more Predacons, Skylynx and Darksteel, appear in Predacons Rising.

=== Synopsis ===
==== Season 1 ====
Season One opens with Cliffjumper being murdered by Starscream, who leads the Decepticons on Earth during Megatron's absence. Following Megatron's return, he uses Cliffjumper's corpse as a test subject for Dark Energon, which he intends to use to create an undead army from Cybertron's fallen warriors. The plan fails when the Autobots destroy Megatron's Space Bridge, leaving him in a comatose state floating in space, and allowing the treacherous Starscream to claim leadership of the Decepticons once more.

The rest of the season takes on a more episodic approach, with each episode focusing on Team Prime having to overcome a new enemy or threat, usually in the form of one of Starscream's schemes. However, some episodes feature other antagonists, such as Skyquake, an ancient Decepticon warrior who is awakened by Starscream to eliminate the Autobots, only to be killed by them; Makeshift, a shape-shifting Decepticon who impersonates Team Prime's ally Wheeljack to find their base (though he is killed before he can actually reveal its location to Starscream); M.E.C.H., a human organization led by the terrorist Silas who seek Cybertronian technology for their ultimate goal of establishing a new world order; and Airachnid, a rogue Decepticon and Arcee's nemesis who previously killed her former partner Tailgate and pursues her own vendetta against the Autobots before later rejoining the Decepticons' ranks to become commander. Knock Out and Breakdown also join the main Decepticon cast, establishing rivalries with Bumblebee and Bulkhead, respectively.

Eventually, Megatron recovers from his coma and reclaims leadership of the Decepticons from Starscream, who later defects to follow his own path and is replaced as Megatron's second-in-command by Airachnid. In the season one finale, the Earth starts to witness several natural disasters, later revealed to be caused by the awakening of Unicron. The Autobots and Megatron join forces to prevent the rise of Unicron, who is ultimately defeated after Optimus uses the Matrix of Leadership to knock him back into hibernation, at the expense of his memories. Regaining his pre-war personality of Orion Pax, he gets manipulated by Megatron into leaving the Autobots and joining the Decepticons.

==== Season 2 ====
In Season Two, Megatron manipulates the amnesiac Optimus into decrypting the Iacon archives, which contain the coordinates of Cybertronian relics hidden on Earth. Jack travels to Cybertron, obtaining Optimus' memories from Vector Sigma, and restores them to Optimus via the Matrix. From this point onwards, most of the season revolves around the Autobots and Decepticons' hunt for the Iacon relics, with both factions retrieving a number of them. Starscream also searches for the relics and manages to beat the Autobots and the Decepticons to some of them.

This season introduces several new characters, such as Smokescreen, the newest member of Team Prime; Dreadwing which was Skyquake's twin brother who seeks to avenge his death and becomes Megatron's new second-in-command; and Hardshell, leader of an Insecticon hive that is found by Airachnid and later comes under Megatron's service. Plotlines featured in this season include M.E.C.H. creating their own Cybertronian called Nemesis Prime; Airachnid killing Breakdown and defecting from the Decepticons to pursue revenge against Megatron, only to be captured by the Autobots; Hardshell being killed by, Miko and Wheeljack in retaliation for hurting Bulkhead during the hunt for an Iacon relic; Silas being gravely injured and fused with Breakdown's body (becoming "Cy.L.A.S." Cybernetic Life Augmented by Symbiosis); and Megatron replacing his right forearm with that of a deceased Prime in order to wield the Forge of Solus Prime and create the Dark Star Saber, a dark counterpart to the Autobots' Star Saber.

Eventually, both the Autobots and the Decepticons learn about the Omega Keys, four Iacon relics used to power the Omega Lock, which can restore life to Cybertron. The Autobots manage to retrieve three of the keys, but Starscream steals them and gives them, along with the fourth key, to Megatron in return for clemency. Meanwhile, Dreadwing learns that Starscream resurrected Skyquake as a Terrorcon, thus desecrating his brother's honorable death, and becomes disillusioned with the Decepticon cause after Megatron allows Starscream to re-join their ranks. He steals the Forge and gives it to Team Prime before trying to exact revenge on Starscream, but is killed by Megatron. The Autobots use the Forge to transform their Ground Bridge into a Space Bridge, giving them the means to travel to Cybertron and find the Omega Lock. Optimus ultimately destroys the Omega Lock to prevent Megatron from using it to "cyberform" the Earth into a replica of Cybertron, but not before the Decepticons use it to create a new base on Earth – Darkmount. The Decepticons then destroy the Autobots' base, unaware the team escaped beforehand using their Ground Bridge, though Optimus stays behind to destroy the bridge, in order to prevent the Decepticons from finding the others' whereabouts, and is seemingly killed.

==== Season 3 (Beast Hunters) ====
The third season, subtitled Beast Hunters, opens with Team Prime divided and on the run from the Decepticons, while the severely damaged but still alive Optimus is being looked after by Smokescreen. New characters are again introduced, namely Ultra Magnus, Optimus's second-in-command and the leader of Bulkhead and Wheeljack's old team, and the coldly logical Decepticon scientist Shockwave, who plans to create an army of Predacons to serve Megatron, starting with Predaking. Eventually, Smokescreen is able to resurrect Optimus using the Forge's last powers after he dies, giving him a new, more powerful body, and the Autobots reunite, destroying Darkmount.

Despite this, the Decepticons remain an active threat, and Shockwave continues work on his Predacon army, until Megatron orders him to terminate it, pinning its destruction on the Autobots, after Predaking shows signs of intelligence and the ability to transform into a robot. During this time, Knock Out experiments on the captive Cy.L.A.S. with Dark Energon, inadvertently turning him into a Terrorcon that feeds on other Transformers' Energon and turns them into Terrorcons as well. He infects most of the Nemesis' crew before freeing Airachnid (who was retrieved by the Decepticons following the Autobot base's destruction), who puts him out of his misery and claims back leadership of the Insecticons. However, she is quickly dealt with by Soundwave, who teleports her and all the Insecticons to one of Cybertron's deserted moons. Later, Soundwave is ordered to kidnap Ratchet, whom Megatron forces to rebuild the Omega Lock using Synthetic Energon. During his imprisonment, Ratchet informs Predaking of the truth about his unborn siblings' destruction, and he defects, attempting to kill Megatron, but fails.

Eventually, the Autobots storm the Nemesis to rescue Ratchet and destroy the Omega Lock. During the battle, Soundwave is trapped in the Shadowzone (a parallel dimension created by the interaction of multiple Ground Bridges), and Bumblebee is mortally wounded by Megatron. However, he is resurrected after falling into a pool of Cybermatter, regaining his voice, and kills Megatron by impaling him with the Star Saber, sending his body falling back to Earth. Afterwards, the Autobots use the Omega Lock to restore Cybertron and head home victorious via the Nemesis, bidding farewell to their human allies and Ratchet, who chose to stay on Earth to continue helping humanity.

==== Predacons Rising ====
The series concludes with a television film, Predacons Rising, in which the Autobots and most of the Decepticons work together to try and rebuild Cybertron. The Autobots also search for the fugitive Starscream and Shockwave, who plan to create an army of Predacons to exact their revenge on the Autobots. Meanwhile, Unicron reanimates and possesses Megatron's body, and with the power of Dark Energon at his fingertips, he seeks to kill Cybertron's core, which is actually his brother Primus, and eliminate all those who oppose him. To stop Unicron, the Autobots must form an uneasy alliance with Predaking and the first of Starscream and Shockwave's new Predacons, Skylynx and Darksteel.

== Episodes ==
Season	Episodes	Originally released	
Season	Episodes	First released	Last released
1	26	November 26, 2010	October 15, 2011
2	26	February 18, 2012	November 2, 2012
3	13	March 22, 2013	July 26, 2013
TV movie		October 4, 2013	

== Characters ==
=== Autobots ===
- Optimus Prime (voiced by Peter Cullen) is the leader of the Autobots who is aided by Team Prime in his mission to protect Earth.
- Ratchet (voiced by Jeffrey Combs) is Team Prime's medical officer and an old friend of Optimus.
- Bumblebee (voiced by Will Friedle) is Team Prime's scout and youngest member. Similar to the live-action films, Bumblebee is mute throughout most of the series and communicates through beeps due to a damaged voice box. However, in the series finale, Bumblebee's voice box is restored.
- Bulkhead (voiced by Kevin Michael Richardson) is Team Prime's muscle and a former Wrecker.
- Arcee (voiced by Sumalee Montano) is Team Prime's sharpshooter, only female bot, and their most agile fighter.
- Wheeljack (voiced by James Horan) is a Wrecker and an old friend of Bulkhead. While initially appearing for one episode in season one, Wheeljack joins Team Prime in the latter half of season two.
- Smokescreen (voiced by Nolan North) is a rookie Autobot soldier and an acquaintance of Optimus' mentor Alpha Trion.
- Ultra Magnus (voiced by Michael Ironside) is Optimus' second-in-command who is far stricter than him and comes to Earth and reunites Team Prime after they are separated.
- Cliffjumper (voiced by Dwayne Johnson in season 1, Billy Brown in season 2) is Arcee's partner who is captured by the Decepticons and killed by Starscream in the series premiere.
- Tailgate (voiced by Josh Keaton) is Arcee's first partner during the war on Cybertron, who was killed by Airachnid.

=== Human allies ===
- Jackson "Jack" Darby (voiced by Josh Keaton) is a high schooler and only child who works at the local burger joint and bonds with Arcee and Smokescreen.
- Miko Nakadai (voiced by Tania Gunadi) is a reckless Japanese exchange student who bonds with Bulkhead and Wheeljack.
- Rafael "Raf" Esquivel (voiced by Andy Pessoa) is a young programming genius who can understand Bumblebee and bonds with him and Ratchet.
- June Darby (voiced by Markie Post) is Jack's single mother and a nurse at the local hospital. She learns the truth about the Cybertronians after being captured by M.E.C.H. at the time when she was briefly allied with Airachnid.
- Special Agent William "Bill" Fowler (voiced by Ernie Hudson) is a retired Army Ranger and Team Prime's connection to the U.S. government.

=== Decepticons ===
- Megatron (voiced by Frank Welker) is the tyrannical leader of the Decepticons and sworn archenemy of Optimus Prime.
- Starscream (voiced by Steve Blum) is the treacherous second-in-command of the Decepticons who seeks to usurp Megatron.
- Soundwave (voiced by Frank Welker) is the cold and emotionless communication officer of the Decepticons with an undying loyalty towards Megatron. Soundwave is silent in almost all of his appearances and chooses to replicate other characters' voices to communicate, except for the Season 3 episode Minus One ("Soundwave superior, Autobots inferior"), which is the only time in the series he speaks.
- Knock Out (voiced by Daran Norris) is the Decepticons' narcissistic medical officer.
- Breakdown (voiced by Adam Baldwin) is a brutish Decepticon soldier and Knock Out's partner who shares a rivalry with Bulkhead to the point of becoming the latter's own nemesis.
- Skyquake (voiced by Richard Green) is a Decepticon warrior loyal to Megatron and is also Dreadwing's twin brother. He was awakened from stasis only to thereupon be killed by Optimus and Bumblebee not long afterwards. Starscream later brought him back to life as a Terrorcon, which did not bode well to Dreadwing when he later found out.
- Makeshift (voiced by Kevin Michael Richardson) is a Decepticon spy who was formatted by Soundwave to impersonate the Autobot Wheeljack in order to find the Autobots' hidden base. He perishes in an explosion caused by one of Wheeljack's bombs.
- Airachnid (voiced by Gina Torres) is Arcee's nemesis and a sadistic murderer who temporarily joins Megatron's ranks. (Note: This villainous character would go on to make her cinematic debut in the 2024 film, Transformers One, voiced by Vanessa Liguori. Though in the film, she would be reimagined as Sentinel Prime's right-hand lieutenant.) She is also shown to have the ability to control the Insecticons.
- Dreadwing (voiced by Tony Todd) is a loyal Seeker commander who becomes Megatron's first lieutenant after Starscream goes rogue. After hearing what happened to Skyquake and having a brief parley with Optimus Prime over the matter, Dreadwing lashed out against Starscream only for Megatron to kill him in self-defense. Afterwards, Megatron told Starscream not to make him regret on who he chose to spare.
- Shockwave (voiced by David Sobolov) is the Decepticons' mad scientist. Originally featured only in one flashback episode, Shockwave joins the Decepticons in the third season.
- Vehicons (variously voiced by Steve Blum, Peter Cullen, David Kaye, Josh Keaton, Daran Norris, Kevin Michael Richardson, David Sobolov, and Frank Welker) are the foot soldiers of the Decepticons.
- Insecticons (variously voiced by Steve Blum, James Horan, Kevin Michael Richardson, and Frank Welker) are the insect-like Cybetronians who later became the alternate foot soldiers for the Decepticons. They can transform into rhinoceros beetles.
  - Hardshell (voiced by David Kaye) is an elite Insecticon who served Megatron. He was later killed by Wheeljack and Miko, subsequent to which Megatron became surprised to learn from Hardshell's fellow Insecticons that a human was responsible for his demise.
  - Bombshock (voiced by Steve Blum) is an Insecticon.

==== Predacons ====
In this show, the Predacons are Cybertronians that can transform into draconic forms. Though having gone extinct, Shockwave had been working on a project to reconstitute them. Three of the Predacons appeared in the TV series and follow-up TV movie while the others were in the toyline, "The Covenant of Primus" book.

- Predaking (voiced by Peter Mensah) is a large Predacon clone created by Shockwave to serve Megatron. He can transform in to a dragon. After gaining some intellect and harming his appointed trainer Starscream at different points, Predaking planned to become the leader of the Predacons that Shockwave was recreating.
- Lazerback is a Predacon clone. He can transform into a quadrupedal land dragon.
- Grimwing is a Predacon clone. He can transform into an "Ursagryph" (a creature that is part-eagle, part-bear, and sporting a short reptilian tail).
- Ripclaw is a Predacon clone. She can transform into a winged quadrupedal dragon with a Siphon Claw-tipped tail.
- Skystalker is a Predacon clone. He can transform into a thin-winged quadrupedal dragon.
- Darksteel (voiced by Steve Blum) is a Predacon clone created by Shockwave in Transformers: Prime - Predacons Rising. He can transform into an "Ursagryph" and is a redeco of Grimwing.
- Skylynx (voiced by Nolan North) is a Predacon clone created by Shockwave in Transformers: Prime - Predacons Rising. He can transform into a thin-winged quadrupedal dragon and is a redeco of Skystalker.
- Vertebreak is a Predacon clone. He can transform into a quadrupedal land dragon and is a redeco of Lazerback.

=== Miscellaneous ===
- Leland "Silas" Bishop (voiced by Clancy Brown) is a renegade military agent and leader of the terrorist group M.E.C.H. who seek to conquer the world using military tech.
- Unicron "the Chaos Bringer" (voiced by John Noble) is the ancient enemy of the Transformers and their creator Primus, his brother, who unwillingly became the core of Earth after his defeat. Unicron's "blood", Dark Energon, which can bring machines to life as terrorcons and empower the Transformers with crippling side effects, is a recurring plot element in the series.
- Thunderwing (voiced by Robin Atkin Downes) is a herald of Unicron created for the purpose of destroying the Matrix of Leadership and appears as the final boss of the video game based on the series.
- Alpha Trion (voiced by George Takei) is a member of the Thirteen (the original Primes) and Optimus' deceased mentor who appears before him as a vision.

== Production ==
=== Development ===
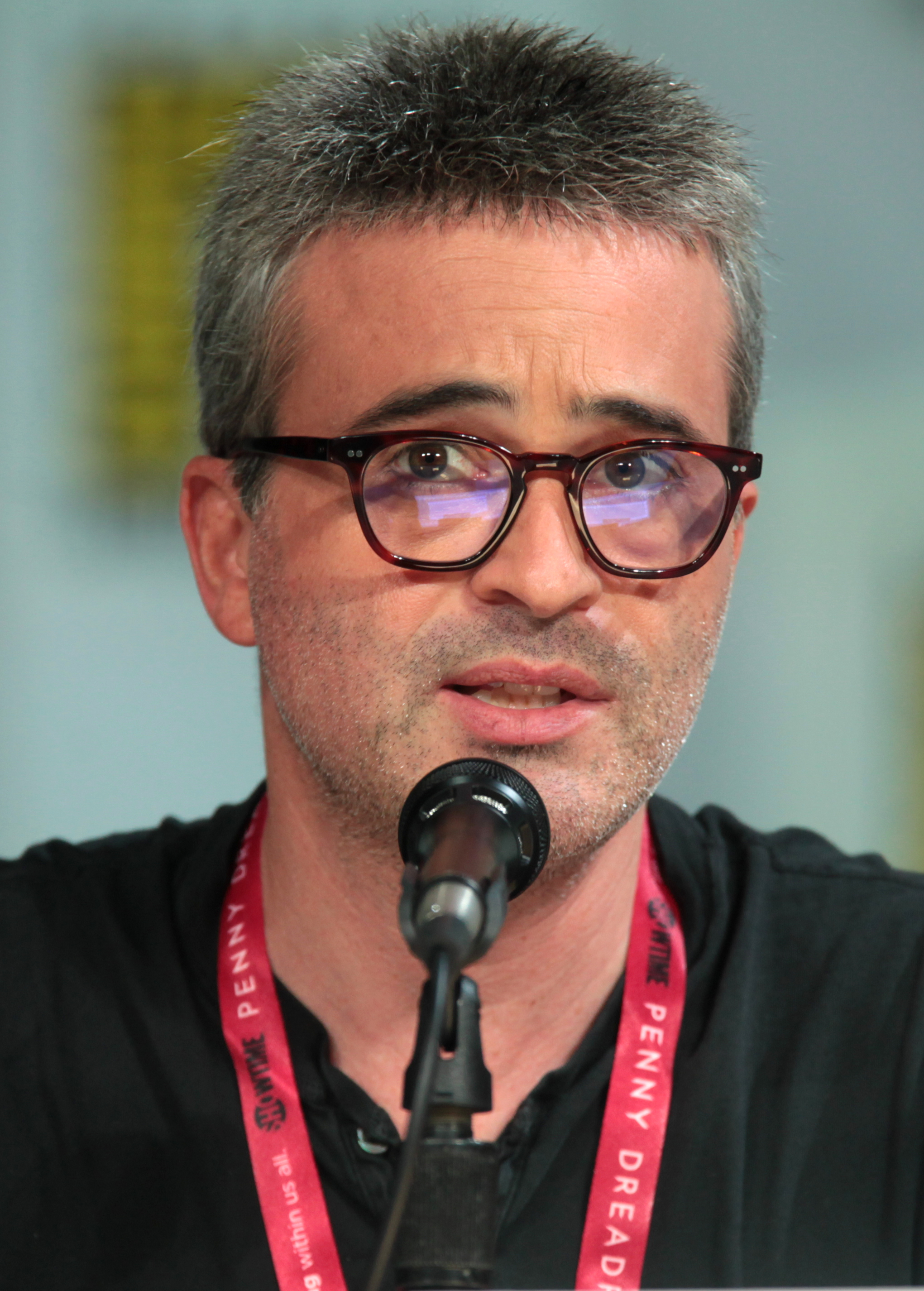
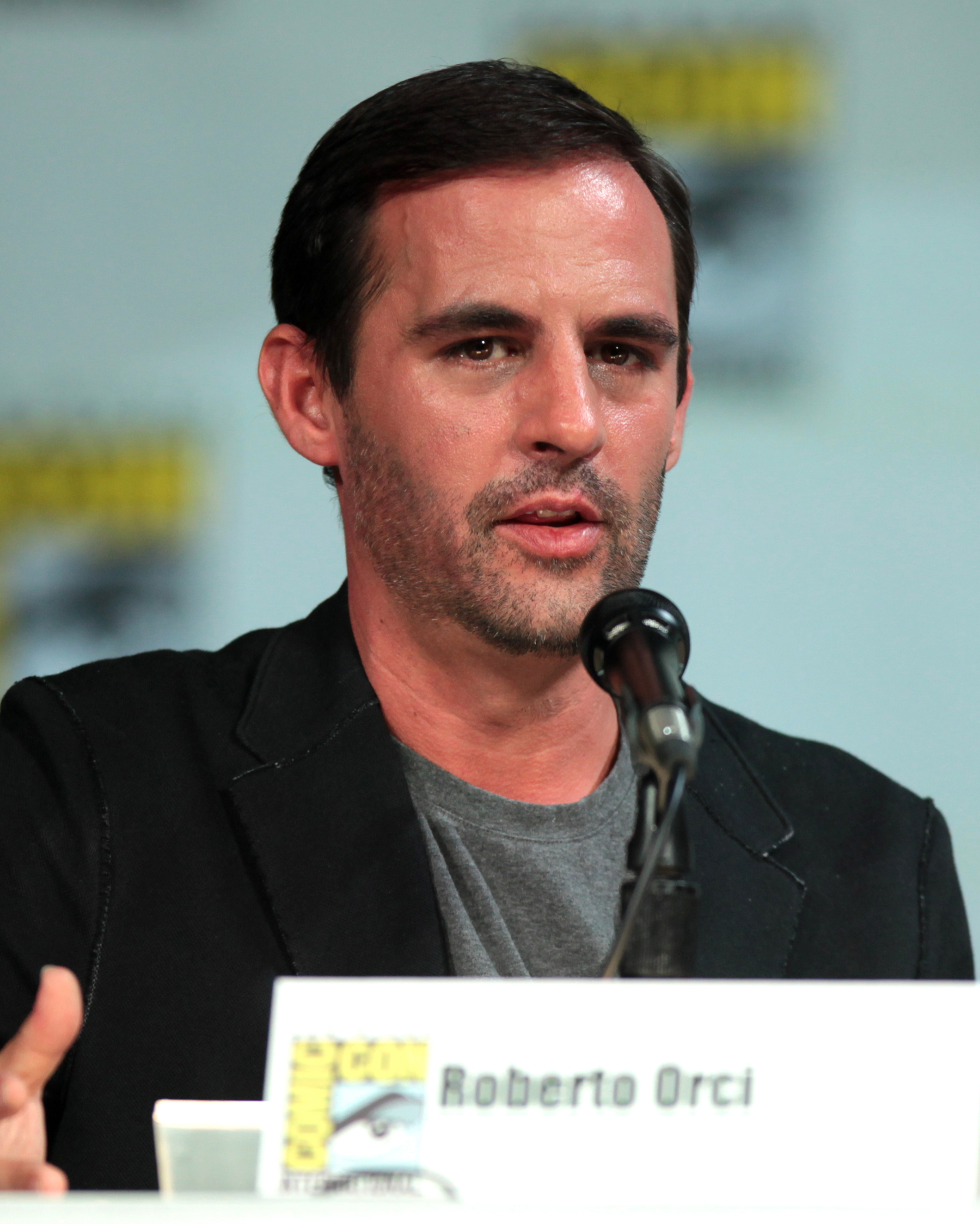
The series were developed by screenwriters Alex Kurtzman (left) and Roberto Orci (right), who wrote first two films of the Transformers film series

Alex Kurtzman and Roberto Orci, co-writers of Transformers and its sequel Revenge of the Fallen, were announced in early February to be helming a new Transformers series which would be CGI-animated. The title of the series was first announced in February 2010 as Transformers: Prime on Jeffrey Combs' website. Combs revealed he would be voicing Ratchet and that the first season would consist of 26 episodes. The series' logo was revealed on May 3, 2010. Orci said that one of the reasons he and Kurtzman decided to come back to the franchise is because when they worked on the live-action film, there were limitations on how much time the Transformers could appear on-screen and what type of actions they could perform, stating:

There were things we wanted to do in the movies that we just couldn't do and there were character arcs that we wanted to explore with the Transformers that we just couldn't do. We wanted to show more of their mythology and their past and their planet and just hang out with them. ... And in the movie, every time you did that, it was very special but it was extremely limited. So there was always another way ... to tell ... Transformers stories and this was ... a lucky accident that .. we got an opportunity to pursue that inspiration[.]

On February 4, 2011, when the show's first season resumed airing, it was announced that it had been renewed for a second season consisting of 26 episodes like the first. The season began airing on February 18, 2012. On March 1, 2013, it was revealed that the third season of Transformers: Prime, which premiered a few weeks later on March 22, would be the show's last. During the same month, it was also announced that following the series finale, a TV movie called Transformers Prime Beast Hunters: Predacons Rising would air and would end the story. According to Hasbro Studios vice president Mike Vogel, "[they] knew, from day one, where [they] were going to try to wrap everything up". Ironhide is originally going to be part of the initial line up, but is replaced by Bulkhead most likely due to their characterizations being too similar.

=== Writing ===
Discussing ideas about the show's themes and inspirations, Orci said that while the live-action film series was "about a boy and his cars", the dynamic between the kids and robots in Prime was to be more like that of The Iron Giant. In a similar statement, Josh Keaton (Jack Darby) revealed in a November 29, 2010, interview with The Trades that while the show does include human main characters, and their relationships with the Autobots are important, they are in the foreground. According to Jeff Kline, from the beginning they had created a story bible of at least "three years' worth of [storylines]" and that "the universal need to find or forge a family and a home" was one of the major themes when developing the series.

Kline said that from the early stages of development they wanted to keep the ensemble of characters small; this was done both for production reasons and to allow deeper characterization and development. Optimus Prime, Megatron and Bumblebee were the characters that were considered "must-haves" for the series. From that point on, they tried to include Autobots and Decepticons that complemented those characters' personalities, "rather than duplicate them".

Regarding Arcee's inclusion in the main cast, Orci said that he regretted killing her off in Transformers: Revenge of the Fallen and that Prime gave them "a chance to do what [they]'ve always wanted to do with her". Kline said the staff wanted to include more Decepticons than Autobots in the series, so that the Autobots would always be at a disadvantage and their jobs would be that much harder. Additionally, when asked about the death of Cliffjumper and other characters in the series, he said that "when we kill a character, we kill a character".

In an interview with MTV, Frank Welker (Megatron), when comparing Prime in the TV series to the original cartoon, said that the writers "go deeper into the evil side of [Megatron] and what's driving him." In a different interview, Peter Cullen (Optimus Prime) said that "the writing is consistent with that of the original series, though in this new version [... my character] has a lot more communication with earthlings, and so he tries to be a little more Earthlike".

During New York Comic Con (NYCC) 2011, many details about season two were revealed. Regarding Optimus' memory loss and joining the Decepticons, Duane Capizzi said that they wanted to satisfy fans' expectations "but take it in unexpected directions. What happens will be pretty unexpected, but pretty organic." On the revelation that Unicron was sealed inside the Earth's core, Kline said that "[they] knew" they had to include him in the series but were initially unsure how. After a writer made the suggestion, they realized Unicron could be included in a way that tied Earth to Cybertron. He also reaffirmed his comment regarding death in the series, stating that "anyone can die" and revealed that "the body count has been upgraded" in season two.

During NYCC 2012, it was revealed that the show would be retitled to Transformers: Prime – Beast Hunters for its third season. In Beast Hunters, the Predacons and Predaking are introduced. By bringing Beasts into the show during the third season Kline said that this allowed them to emphasize further how Earth and Cybertron are "brother, or twin, planets"; something they had earlier indicated with Unicron's arc in season one. He called the addition of beasts "fantastic" as it allowed them to keep shifting allegiances and "keep the [Autobots and Decepticons] out of balance".

=== Casting ===
The first voice actor to be cast in the series was Jeffrey Combs as Ratchet. Combs revealed this on his personal website on February 4, 2010. On May 17, 2010, it was announced that Peter Cullen, who had originated the role of Optimus Prime in the original series and voiced him in the live-action film series, would return as Optimus' voice in Prime. During San Diego Comic-Con on July 8, 2010, it was revealed that Frank Welker would also reprise the role of Megatron from the original series. Besides Optimus and Ratchet, Autobots Bumblebee, Arcee and Bulkhead were also announced. It was also revealed that Starscream and Soundwave would be part of the Decepticons.

On September 8, 2010, the show's voice actors were announced. Kline would later reveal that Hasbro Studios had placed high importance in getting Cullen and Frank Welker to reprise their roles as Optimus Prime and Megatron respectively. Steven Blum (Starscream) revealed in an interview that during recording of Transformers: Prime, he and the cast are given the scripts and "a couple of days [...] to figure out where the story is going". During New York Comic Con, 2011 it was announced that Tony Todd, who voiced The Fallen in Transformers: Revenge of the Fallen, would join the series in season two as Dreadwing.

According to Adam Baldwin, Breakdown's voice actor, the reason for his character being killed off and being let go from the show was due to "budget cuts".

=== Music ===
Music in the series was composed by Brian Tyler. Tyler stated that when he approached to perform the music for the series, they wanted it to be "cinematic, thematic [and feature] classic scores, similar to Star Wars." Live orchestras were used to create the music.

A soundtrack was released on March 6, 2012.

Transformers Prime (Music from the Animated Series)

Soundtrack album by Brian Tyler
- Released: March 6, 2012
- Genre: Soundtrack
- Length: 1:12:24
- Label: Lakeshore Records

Brian Tyler chronology
Terra Nova (2012)	''Transformers Prime (Music from the Animated Series)'' (2012)	Thor: The Dark World (2013)

Transformers Prime (Music from the Animated Series)
No.	Title	Length
1.	"Transformers Prime"	3:21
2.	"Optimus Prime Returns"	2:07
3.	"One Shall Rise"	2:43
4.	"Dreadwing"	1:41
5.	"In Defense of Humanity"	2:26
6.	"We Have Returned"	4:42
7.	"Relentless Pursuit"	4:36
8.	"This Is Your Home Now"	5:02
9.	"Autobot Stratagum"	2:38
10.	"Battle in the Energon Mine"	3:11
11.	"Proximity Sensors"	2:17
12.	"Cutting It a Bit Close"	1:28
13.	"The Cons Are Back"	4:46
14.	"RC on the Move"	2:02
15.	"Always Welcome"	2:11
16.	"Arachnid"	4:10
17.	"The Space Bridge"	1:29
18.	"Dogfight"	4:52
19.	"Bumblebee"	1:37
20.	"Next Day after School"	1:12
21.	"Cybertron"	1:31
22.	"Megatron on the Move"	2:44
23.	"The Construct"	2:16
24.	"Prime Finale"	4:16
25.	"Transformers Prime End Title"	3:05

== Broadcast and release ==
=== United States ===
In the United States, Transformers: Prime aired on Hasbro and Discovery Communications-owned television network, The Hub. The show began broadcasting on November 29, 2010, continuing to December 3, 2010. The rest of season one began to air on February 11, 2011. Reruns of the series began airing on The CW as part of the Vortexx block (owned by Saban Brands, that Hasbro eventually purchase their assets including the Power Rangers franchise in 2018) on December 8, 2012, making Prime the first Hasbro Studios animated production to appear on United States terrestrial television. The series was added to Kabillion in July 2019.

Reruns on Discovery Family ended in August 2023.

The series is currently available for streaming online on Amazon Prime Video, Plex, The Roku Channel, Toon Goggles and Tubi, as well as the official Transformers YouTube channel.

=== International ===
On November 9, 2010, Hasbro Studios announced a broadcasting rights deal with Corus Entertainment in Canada, which included Transformers: Prime. The series premiered there on January 9, 2011, on Teletoon, half-owned by Corus. As a part of the deal between Hasbro Studios and Turner Broadcasting System Europe announced on December 13, 2010, Transformers: Prime began broadcasting in the United Kingdom on September 5, 2011, then in Central Europe, South Africa, and the Middle East on September 10, 2011, on the pan-European Cartoon Network.

In Singapore, Mediacorp has broadcasting rights for Hasbro Studios programs including Prime, with the English version airing on Okto. In Malaysia, Media Prima has broadcasting rights for Hasbro Studios programs including Prime; the series was broadcast on NTV7. In India, the series premiered on Discovery Kids on May 6, 2013. The third season launched on October 19, 2014. It was also released on Big Magic in February 2020.

In Southeast Asia (including the Philippines), the series premiered on Cartoon Network on June 18, 2012, with its second and third seasons also aired on their sister network Toonami, and then on TV5 in the Philippines on December 7, 2015.

=== Home media ===
Season	Episodes	Originally aired		DVD and Blu-ray release dates		
Season	Episodes	First aired	Last aired	Region 1	Region 2	Region 4
1	26	November 29, 2010	October 15, 2011	March 6, 2012	November 9, 2012	December 12, 2012
2	26	February 18, 2012	November 2, 2012	DVD release: November 20, 2012; Blu-Ray release: November 27, 2012	March 23, 2015	October 14, 2015
3	13	March 22, 2013	July 26, 2013	December 3, 2013	November 9, 2015	February 3, 2016

In the United States and Canada, Shout! Factory has the home distribution rights to the series. The complete first season was first released on DVD and Blu-ray on March 6, 2012. The complete second season was first released on DVD on November 20, 2012, with the Blu-ray version being released seven days later. The third and final season, Beast Hunters, was released on December 3, 2013.

== Reception ==
=== Ratings ===
The series attracted approximately 102,000 viewers per episode.

The Transformers: Prime/G.I. Joe Renegades special programming block on Friday from 3:30 p.m.–7;00 p.m. generated significant household and key audiences over the previous week. "[Households] (+111%, 97,000); Persons [age] 2+ (+133%, 142,000); Kids [ages] 2-11 (+130%, 62,000); Kids 6-11 (+78%, 32,000); Adults 18-49 (+117%, 50,000) and Women 18-49 (+120%, 11,000)."

=== Critical response ===
Dusty Stower of Screen Rant, placed Transformers: Prime as the sixth best Transformers cartoon. Stower described the first season as "a very slow burn, [with] its eventual payoff [being] incredibly anticlimactic" and that in their attempt to focus on the Transformers' mythology, the writers "forgot to craft three-dimensional, likable characters". However, he concluded that the show did live up to its promise of an epic tale late in its run and reacted positively to Prime's portrayal of Ratchet and Starscream.

Eric Goldman of IGN gave season one a "great" 8.0 out of 10. He praised the show for creating fully formed, relatable characters, well-done action sequences, serious-minded storylines and voice acting, singling out Peter Cullen (Optimus Prime), Jeffrey Combs (Ratchet) and Frank Welker's (Megatron) performances. He criticized Bumblebee's portrayal as mute. He concluded the review saying that the series "accomplishes its goals, delivering plenty of fun and action, while also incorporating darker and more complex moments that older viewers can appreciate".

Brian Lowry of Variety said that Transformers: Prime is "unexpectedly sharp" and better than the movies, adding that the show's CGI animation is well-suited for rendering shiny robots and "their vehicular alter egos"; he ended the review by saying that while "there's nothing more than meets the eye here, [..] what does appear is plenty entertaining".

=== Accolades ===
Year	Award	Category	Recipient	Result	Ref.
2011	Daytime Emmy Awards	Outstanding Performer in an Animated Program	Peter Cullen (as Optimus Prime)	Nominated	
2011	Daytime Emmy Awards	Outstanding Directing in an Animated Program	David Hartman, Shaunt Nigoghossian, Todd Waterman, Vinton Heuck and Susan Blu	Nominated	
2011	Daytime Emmy Awards	Outstanding Individual Achievement in Animation	Vince Toyama	Won	
2011	Daytime Emmy Awards	Outstanding Individual Achievement in Animation	Christophe Vacher	Won	
2011	Daytime Emmy Awards	Outstanding Music Direction and Composition	Brian Tyler	Nominated	
2011	Daytime Emmy Awards	Outstanding Writing in Animation	Duane Capizzi, Steven Melching, Nicole Dubuc, Joseph Kuhr and Marsha Griffin	Nominated	
2012	Daytime Creative Arts Emmy Awards	Outstanding Special Class Animated Program	Roberto Orci, Stephen Davis, Shuzo John Shiota, Alex Kurtzman, Jeff Kline, Duane Capizzi, Mandy Safavi, Rafael Ruthchild, Shinji Santoh, Meiko Sato and Therese Trujillo	Won	
2012	Daytime Creative Arts Emmy Awards	Outstanding Directing in an Animated Program	David Hartman, Vinton Heuck, Shaunt Nigoghossian, Todd Waterman, Jamie Simone, Hiroyuki Hayashi, Kazuma Shimizu, Kazushi Nagase, Keisuke Ide and Akio Kazumi	Nominated	
2012	Daytime Creative Arts Emmy Awards	Outstanding Achievement in Sound Editing – Animation	Robbi Smith	) here, or it will cause coding problems -->style="background: #FFE3E3; color: black; vertical-align: middle; text-align: center; " class="no table-no2 notheme"|Nominated	
2012	Daytime Creative Arts Emmy Awards	Outstanding Achievement in Sound Editing – Animation	Robert Poole II	) here, or it will cause coding problems -->style="background: #FFE3E3; color: black; vertical-align: middle; text-align: center; " class="no table-no2 notheme"|Nominated	
2012	Daytime Creative Arts Emmy Awards	Outstanding Achievement in Sound Editing – Animation	Roy Braverman	) here, or it will cause coding problems -->style="background: #FFE3E3; color: black; vertical-align: middle; text-align: center; " class="no table-no2 notheme"|Nominated	
2012	Daytime Creative Arts Emmy Awards	Outstanding Achievement in Sound Mixing – Animation	Ray Leonard	) here, or it will cause coding problems -->style="background: #FFE3E3; color: black; vertical-align: middle; text-align: center; " class="no table-no2 notheme"|Nominated	
2012	Daytime Creative Arts Emmy Awards	Outstanding Achievement in Sound Mixing – Animation	Mike Beiriger	) here, or it will cause coding problems -->style="background: #FFE3E3; color: black; vertical-align: middle; text-align: center; " class="no table-no2 notheme"|Nominated	
2012	Daytime Creative Arts Emmy Awards	"Outstanding Individual Achievement in Animation"	Christophe Vacher	Won	
2012	CINE Awards	CINE Eagle Award	Whole crew	Won	
2012	CINE Awards	CINE Special Recognition for Series Television	Whole crew	Won	
2012	CINE Awards	CINE Special Jury Award	Whole crew	Nominated	
2012	CINE Awards	CINE Masters Series Award	Whole crew	Nominated	
2013	Daytime Creative Arts Emmy Awards	Outstanding Individual Achievement in Animation	Arato Kato	) here, or it will cause coding problems -->style="background: #9EFF9E; color: #000; vertical-align: middle; text-align: center; " class="yes table-yes2 notheme"|Won	
2013	Daytime Creative Arts Emmy Awards	Outstanding Individual Achievement in Animation	Jason Park	) here, or it will cause coding problems -->style="background: #9EFF9E; color: #000; vertical-align: middle; text-align: center; " class="yes table-yes2 notheme"|Won	
2013	Daytime Creative Arts Emmy Awards	Outstanding Individual Achievement in Animation	Kirk van Wormer	) here, or it will cause coding problems -->style="background: #9EFF9E; color: #000; vertical-align: middle; text-align: center; " class="yes table-yes2 notheme"|Won	
2013	Annie Award	Outstanding Achievement in Production Design in an Animated TV / Broadcast Production	Christophe Vacher	Nominated	

== Merchandise and other media ==
=== Toy line ===
The official launch date of the toy line was December 1, 2011. The release date of July 2011 was incorrectly stated during BotCon 2011, but the December 1, 2011, date was later confirmed by the Hasbro Brand Team. Although earlier sources stated that the line would launch on October 1, 2011, or October 11, 2011.

=== Mobile media ===
Ruckus Mobile Media partnered with Hasbro to deliver Transformers: Prime innovative storybook apps for Android, and iOS (iPad, iPhone, iPod Touch) systems. The app was meant to deliver immersive reading experiences with interactive storytelling including title specific activities, coloring and read-and-record functions. The app was slated to release in May 2011, but never came out.

=== Books ===
IDW Publishing has released a group of comic books based on Transformers: Prime. A comic book prequel was released on October 13, 2010, in the United States, followed by an October 26, 2010, Canadian release date. Adaptations of episodes (usually two episodes per comic book) from the series are currently being released, similar to the Transformers: Animated comic books. Some Transformers: Prime storybooks were released in April, August and September 2012, in the UK including Transformers Prime: Official Handbook and Transformers Prime: Meet the Team.

IDW has also published Transformers. Prime: Rage of the Dinobots and Transformers Prime: Beast Hunters, two comic book tie-ins that link the cartoon and the video games developed by High Moon Studios.

=== Video game ===
A video game developed by Nowpro and Altron distributed by Activision was released in October 2012. The game, titled Transformers: Prime – The Game, is a brawler available for Wii, Nintendo DS, Nintendo 3DS, and Wii U. Both the 3DS and Wii U versions of the game received mixed critical reviews.

=== Sequel ===
A sequel called Transformers: Robots in Disguise debuted in March 2015. The series features Bumblebee as a police officer and follows his adventures on Earth, trying to catch escaped Decepticon prisoners. The series introduces a new cast of characters who help Bumblebee in his mission, including Strongarm, Sideswipe, Grimlock, Fixit, and the humans Denny Clay and his son Russell. Optimus Prime appears in a recurring capacity during the first season as a spirit, before being resurrected in the finale and joining the main cast from season two onwards. The only other characters to return from Transformers: Prime are Ratchet, Bulkhead, Soundwave, and Starscream. Robots in Disguise is much more light-hearted in tone than its predecessor and received an overall mixed reception.
