= Roughnecks: Starship Troopers Chronicles =

- The DVD cover of Roughnecks: Starship Troopers Chronicles - The Complete Campaigns
- Genre: Military science fiction; Action; Comedy drama
- Based on: Starship Troopers by Robert A. Heinlein; Starship Troopers by Paul Verhoeven
- Developed by: Richard Raynis; Duane Capizzi; Jeff Kline
- Voices of: Jamie Hanes; David DeLuise; James Horan; Bill Fagerbakke; Rino Romano; E.G. Daily; Tish Hicks; Nicholas Guest; Rider Strong; Alexander Polinsky; Steve Staley; Thomas Wagner; Irene Bedard; R. Lee Ermey
- Theme music composer: Jim Latham
- Composers: Jim Latham; Wayne Boon
- Country of origin: United States
- Original language: English
- No. of seasons: 1
- No. of episodes: 40 (36 narrative episodes and 4 clip shows)

Production
- Executive producers: Paul Verhoeven; Richard Raynis
- Producer: Audu Paden
- Running time: 21 minutes
- Production companies: Verhoeven-Marshall; Adelaide Productions; Columbia TriStar Television

Original release
- Network: Syndication (Bohbot Kids Network)
- Release: August 30, 1999 – April 3, 2000

Related
- Starship Troopers (film)

Roughnecks: Starship Troopers Chronicles is an American animated television series (1999–2000) based on the 1959 novel Starship Troopers by Robert A. Heinlein and its 1997 film adaptation. The film's director, Paul Verhoeven, served as an executive producer. The series follows the Mobile Infantry unit known as Razak's Roughnecks during a war between a united humanity and insectoid aliens known as the Bugs or Arachnids. It follows a separate continuity from the film and incorporates elements of the novel, including the Skinnies and powered armor.

The series began airing in August 1999 on the syndicated Bohbot Kids Network block and ran for one season. Production difficulties left four planned story episodes unfinished; 36 narrative episodes and four clip shows were completed, and the series ended without a completed finale. Its episodes were subsequently released on DVD.

== Plot ==
When the Mobile Infantry defeats an infestation on Pluto, the world is united as the Strategically Integrated Coalition of Nations (SICON) declares war on the insectoids.

The main story focuses on a group of troopers known as Alpha Team – otherwise known as Razak's Roughnecks – who are headed back to Pluto after Operation Pest Control.

After destroying Bug City on Pluto, SICON sights a giant Transport Bug. This reveals that the Bugs are not native to Pluto. They track it to the planet Hydora, which orbits a star in the Constellation Virgo and encounter a Brain Bug, an intelligent Bug that controls the other castes so they won't go insane and destroy each other. The Bugs are planning to take control of the entire universe and won't stop until the human race is extinct.

SICON attempts to set up a base on the planet Tophet, inhabited by a species nicknamed Skinnies. The Skinnies, however, have been enslaved by the Bugs to mine Xylon, a precious mineral used for Transport Bugs. The Mobile Infantry are able to destroy the Control Bugs overseeing the Skinnies and free Tophet, but the victory costs them their comrade Carl Jenkins, who has been put into a state of mental trauma. The Skinnies soon enlist in SICON to fight the Bugs, mainly due to their lack of interstellar travel technology.

SICON soon discovers the existence of the Bug homeworld Klendathu. They attempt to destroy the Bug Queen but she escapes, headed for Earth. Her Transport Bug is destroyed before she reaches the human homeworld, but she nevertheless makes it to Earth.

=== Main characters ===
The principal characters and their voice actors include:

- Johnny Rico (voiced by Rino Romano) – A Mobile Infantry soldier who eventually assumes command of the Roughnecks after Razak's death.
- Isabelle "Dizzy" Flores (voiced by E. G. Daily) – A trooper, longtime friend and romantic interest of Rico.
- Lieutenant Jean Razak (voiced by Jamie Hanes) – The veteran officer commanding Razak's Roughnecks.
- Carl Jenkins (voiced by Rider Strong) – Rico's friend and a psychic soldier whose abilities attract the attention of military intelligence.
- Robert "Paperboy" Higgins (voiced by Alexander Polinsky) – A FedNet reporter attached to the squad who narrates its exploits.
- T'Phai (voiced by Steve Staley) – A Skinnie commander freed from Arachnid control who joins the Mobile Infantry.
- Sergeant Francis Brutto (voiced by David DeLuise) – The squad's strict senior noncommissioned officer.
- Richard "Doc" LeCroix (voiced by James Horan) – The squad's medic.
- Jeff "Goss" Gossard (voiced by Bill Fagerbakke) – A trooper specializing in technical equipment and engineering.
- Carmen Ibanez (voiced by Tish Hicks) – A SICON Fleet pilot and former schoolmate of Rico, Flores and Jenkins.
- Zander Barcalow (voiced by Nicholas Guest) – A Fleet pilot who is transformed into a human–Arachnid hybrid.

=== Campaigns ===
The episodes were issued on DVD in eight collections, generally named after the show's campaigns. Six collections have five narrative episodes each; the Trackers collection combines one transitional episode with four clip shows, and The Homefront Campaign includes five completed narrative episodes. Four planned story episodes were never completed.

1. The Pluto Campaign (5 episodes) Takes place on Pluto.
2. The Hydora Campaign (5 episodes) Takes place on Hydora, which is almost entirely covered by water.
3. The Tophet Campaign (5 episodes) Takes place on Tophet, a desert planet which is home to the Skinnies.
4. The Tesca Campaign (5 episodes) Takes place on the jungle moon of Tesca Nemerosa.
5. The Zephyr Campaign (5 episodes) Takes place on a frozen asteroid.
6. The Klendathu Campaign (5 episodes) Takes place on the Bugs' home world Klendathu.
7. Trackers (1 narrative episode plus 4 clip shows on the DVD) The new episode follows the pursuit of the Bug Queen towards Earth; the clip shows revisit earlier events.
8. The Homefront Campaign (5 completed episodes, with 4 additional episodes unfinished) Takes place on Earth.

== Episodes ==
The table lists the 36 completed narrative episodes in their original story order, using planned production numbers rather than the inconsistent broadcast order. Four additional planned narrative episodes (33 and 38–40) were not completed; their intended plots are identified below. The four compilation episodes, grouped under Trackers to reflect their DVD release, bring the total to 40 completed episodes.

Number	Title	Plot summary
The Pluto Campaign
1	"Freefall"	Rico, Flores and Jenkins join Razak’s Roughnecks for their first combat drop on Pluto, where they confront the Arachnid infestation.
2	"Plasma Bugs of Navarone"	When plasma-firing Bugs bring down Carmen Ibanez and Zander Barcalow near a research station, Rico risks the squad’s mission to rescue them.
3	"Handle with Care"	Intelligence officer Walker orders the squad to capture a living Plasma Bug; Razak must decide whether to obey orders or aid endangered troops.
4	"Basic Training"	Rico trains the inexperienced reporter Higgins to survive in combat while the Roughnecks encounter a dangerous new flying Bug.
5	"Deep Trouble"	The squad enters the underground Bug nest to destroy its incubation centre, forcing the claustrophobic Flores to confront her fear.
The Hydora Campaign
6	"Water, Water Everywhere"	Following a Transport Bug from Pluto, the Roughnecks reach the ocean planet Hydora and encounter new airborne Arachnids.
7	"Swarm"	As the fighting spreads across Hydora, Carmen becomes stranded during an evacuation, prompting another rescue by the squad.
8	"Search and Destroy"	The Roughnecks seek the nest of the flying Rippler Bugs; Jenkins is critically injured by a venomous projectile.
9	"Missing in Action"	Investigating the disappearance of two Mobile Infantry squads, the Roughnecks encounter large aquatic predators and Bugs beneath Hydora’s surface.
10	"Sole Survivor"	A disoriented officer found without his missing squad provides clues to a dangerous Bug operation, and the Roughnecks are themselves captured.
The Tophet Campaign
11	"Betrayal"	On the desert planet Tophet, the squad meets the humanoid Skinnies, who claim the Bugs have been driven away; the soldiers suspect deception.
12	"Stranded"	Razak and Higgins are cut off behind enemy lines while a SICON air strike threatens to hit their position.
13	"Of Flesh and Steel"	A prototype robot soldier, C.H.A.S., joins the unit during an assault; Rico questions the value of machines as comrades.
14	"Captured"	Skinnie forces take the Roughnecks prisoner, and the squad tries to escape while learning more about Tophet’s occupation.
15	"The Face of Truth"	The capture of Skinnie officer T’Phai reveals that parasitic Control Bugs are enslaving his people, offering SICON a means to free Tophet.
The Tesca Campaign
16	"No Substitute"	The newly allied Skinnie T’Phai joins the Roughnecks on Tesca Nemerosa, where suspicion of his former allegiance threatens teamwork.
17	"...And Then There Were Two"	Rico and T’Phai are forced to rely on one another after other members of their squad disappear in Tesca’s jungle.
18	"Marauder"	During a search for a Brain Bug, Rico becomes trapped underwater when his Marauder fighting machine loses power.
19	"Liquid Dreams"	Badly injured, Rico undergoes treatment in a regeneration tank, where dreams and memories mingle with fears about the approaching Bug threat.
20	"Heart"	Rico struggles to convince the others of a Bug attack while recovering; meanwhile the Roughnecks investigate tunnels near their base.
The Zephyr Campaign
21	"Ice-Olation"	The Roughnecks’ transport crashes on a frozen asteroid during a scientific mission, and fire-breathing Bugs complicate the search for help.
22	"Mixed Signals"	The marooned squad searches for an anti-Bug toxin and attempts to restore communications while fending off Firefries.
23	"Hot Ice"	With their ship disabled on the asteroid, the Roughnecks search for a missing research vessel and a means of escape.
24	"The Inside Story"	The soldiers struggle to defend their damaged ship and discover more about the asteroid’s enormous living organism; Zander’s behaviour grows increasingly erratic.
25	"The Ice Men Goeth"	Trapped inside a giant Ice Bug, the Roughnecks fight to restore the ship’s air supply and escape as Zander becomes a threat.
The Klendathu Campaign
26	"Metamorphosis"	During the voyage to Klendathu, Zander transforms into a Bug-human hybrid and takes control of parts of the Roughnecks’ starship.
27	"D-Day"	SICON launches its invasion of Klendathu; Flores struggles after learning her brother is missing, and Rico assumes greater responsibility.
28	"The Mission"	An Arachnid disguised in stolen powered armour infiltrates a base, and Razak becomes ill during a subsequent rescue mission.
29	"Letters Home"	Expecting a potentially fatal Bug attack, the Roughnecks record farewell messages for their families before holding their position.
30	"Checkmate"	The squad attempts to kill the Bug Queen on Klendathu, but she escapes aboard a Transport Bug bound for Earth.
Trackers
31	"Trackers"	Pursuing the Queen’s Transport Bug, SICON destroys apparent targets that turn out to be decoys; the Roughnecks attempt to intercept the real vessel.
Compilation episodes (released with Trackers)
C1	"Pluto and Beyond"	Higgins reviews the opening stages of the war using footage from earlier episodes.
C2	"Propaganda Machine"	Ordered to produce a favourable FedNet report, Higgins revisits earlier missions while confronting the contrast between propaganda and combat.
C3	"Marooned"	Stranded alone in space after an equipment failure, Rico recalls past battles and his fellow Roughnecks.
C4	"Court-Martial of Lt. Razak"	A military inquiry examines Razak’s decision to bomb a landing zone, with testimony and flashbacks revisiting earlier missions.
The Homefront Campaign
32	"Among Us"	Although SICON believes the Queen has been killed, Jenkins detects her presence on Earth; the Roughnecks uncover a Bug-controlled community.
33	"Homefront" (unproduced)	Planned to depict the Bugs' devastating attack on Buenos Aires and the Roughnecks' deployment to defend the city, leaving Rico, Flores and Jenkins fearing for their families.
34	"Hide n' Seek"	The squad infiltrates a Bug stronghold near Buenos Aires and locates mobile plasma artillery so SICON can destroy the nest.
35	"Requiem"	Razak challenges a plan to destroy San Francisco to eradicate the Bugs beneath it; he is killed during an alternative operation to save the city.
36	"Funeral for a Friend"	While fulfilling Razak’s last wishes, the Roughnecks discover another Bug plot; Rico earns a promotion after leading the rescue of captured comrades.
37	"Spirits of the Departed"	Newly promoted Rico struggles with command during the defence of Honolulu, receiving guidance from Sergeant Zim as the invasion continues.
38	"Gates of Hell" (unproduced)	During the planned battle to retake SICON headquarters on Oahu, Rico and Flores attempt a relationship. The Bugs then open a vast pit beneath the headquarters and abduct Sky Marshal Sanchez.
39	"Circle of the Damned" (unproduced)	Part of the planned conclusion to the war, involving the battle to retake Hawaii and the discovery of an enormous underground Bug hive beneath SICON headquarters.
40	"Final Inferno" (unproduced)	The planned concluding storyline involved the Roughnecks encountering the Bug Queen inside the underground hive. The intended ending was not disclosed in the published interview.

== Production ==
The series was adapted from Robert A. Heinlein's 1959 novel Starship Troopers and the 1997 film Starship Troopers, directed by Paul Verhoeven, who served as an executive producer. It takes place in a separate continuity from the film rather than following its events. The series retains elements of the novel omitted from the film, particularly the humanoid aliens known as the Skinnies and powered armor.

The series was produced by Columbia TriStar Television and Adelaide Productions for daily television syndication, with each week originally intended to present a five-episode campaign. It premiered on the syndicated Bohbot Kids Network block in the United States and Canada in August 1999. The series subsequently aired on the Sci-Fi Channel in the United States and Teletoon in Canada. The entire series was also made available on Crackle in the United States, along with several shorter "minisodes". Although initially planned as traditional 2-D animation, Sony contracted Foundation Imaging to produce the series using 3-D computer animation. The production employed motion capture for human characters, while the Bugs, robots, vehicles and environments were computer-generated.

The ambitious production schedule proved difficult to maintain. By late September 1999, only nine of the 40 ordered episodes had been completed. Flat Earth Productions withdrew after completing three of its contracted 15 episodes, citing the demanding schedule and limited budget, while Rainbow Studios and Hyper Image were brought in to assist Foundation Imaging. Flat Earth worked on episodes 12 and 13, Hyper Image on episodes 20–22, and Rainbow Studios on episodes 23–25.

The production delays also disrupted the broadcast schedule. According to Glen Oliver of Ain't It Cool News, the series entered daily syndication with only five or six episodes available, forcing stations to repeat the same material while awaiting new episodes. Some stations reportedly dropped the series, while others inserted new episodes into the rotation as they became available, interrupting the intended narrative sequence. The shortage of completed episodes and resulting repeated broadcasts were independently reported by Animation World Network.

Of the 40 originally planned narrative episodes, only 36 were completed. To fulfill Sony's 40-episode order, four clip shows were produced, incorporating footage from earlier episodes alongside some new material. These were "Pluto and Beyond", "Propaganda Machine", "Marooned" and "Court-Martial of Lt. Razak". The first two primarily recap the early campaigns, while "Marooned" uses flashbacks to earlier missions and "Court-Martial of Lt. Razak" incorporates testimony concerning Razak's command decisions.

The unfinished narrative episodes were episode 33 ("Homefront") and episodes 38–40 ("Gates of Hell", "Circle of the Damned" and "Final Inferno"). Episodes 32 and 34–37 were completed, leaving gaps in the final Homefront Campaign. Episode 33 was intended to depict the destruction of Buenos Aires, an event referenced in subsequent episodes. According to story editor Greg Weisman, the planned conclusion involved a battle to retake Hawaii, the discovery of a vast subterranean Bug hive beneath SICON headquarters and a confrontation with the Bug Queen. Scripts, voice recordings and preliminary production material existed for the unfinished episodes, but the series ended after one season on a cliffhanger, without a completed series finale.

== DVD releases ==
The series was initially released on DVD in separate campaign volumes by Columbia TriStar Home Entertainment. These were not issued in narrative order, with The Klendathu Campaign, for example, released before the preceding Zephyr Campaign. The final volume, Trackers (2004), contained episode 31, which had been omitted from the Homefront Campaign DVD because of the five-episode limit imposed on the individual releases, alongside the four compilation episodes.

On July 5, 2005, Sony Pictures Home Entertainment released Roughnecks: Starship Troopers Chronicles – The Complete Campaigns, a four-disc box set containing all 40 completed episodes. Unlike the original DVD releases, the collection omitted the cast and crew commentaries, animatics and other supplementary material, retaining photo galleries. The original Homefront Campaign DVD included commentary discussing the unfinished episodes and the intended conclusion.

== Reception ==
Critical assessments of Roughnecks: Starship Troopers Chronicles were mixed. Writing in The Encyclopedia of Science Fiction, Jack Nicholls and Peter Nicholls considered the series more sophisticated than might be expected of a film spin-off, noting its restoration of elements from Heinlein's novel that had been omitted from the film. Reviewing The Zephyr Campaign for DVD Talk in 2003, David Blair praised the writing, action and suspense, although he noted inconsistencies in the computer animation and criticized the quality of the DVD transfer.

Other reviewers were less enthusiastic. TechnoFILE praised the computer animation as impressive for a television production but criticized the reduction of the violence and adult themes of the source material to suit younger audiences. Reviewing The Complete Campaigns box set in 2005, Scott Weinberg of DVD Talk criticized the emphasis on action at the expense of plot and characterization, finding that the frequent combat sequences became repetitive.

The series won the 2000 Daytime Emmy Award for Outstanding Achievement in Sound Editing – Special Class. In a retrospective assessment published in 2026, Sergio Pereira of Space.com included it among the best science-fiction television series to last only one season, praising its action and worldbuilding while acknowledging its dated CGI.
