= Darby Pop Publishing =

US comic book publisher

Darby Pop Publishing is an American comic book publishing company founded in 2013 by film writer and producer Jeff Kline. It has published sixteen original series and over one hundred issues/trade paperbacks (TPs) to date.

Creators have included Eric Garcia (City: The Mind in the Machine), John Raffo (The 7th Sword), Scott Marder/Rob Rosell/Jack Lambert (Doberman), Matthew Federman & Stephen Scaia (Dead Squad), and Kline himself (Indestructible).

In July 2015, Darby Pop Publishing partnered with Magnetic Press and released Side-Kicked by Russell Brettholtz, Dead Man's Party by Jeff Marsick, Fake Empire by Eric Palicki, The Living Finger by Garth Matthams, and Sweet Lullaby by A.J. Scherkenbach.

In October 2015, Darby Pop Publishing announced a collaboration with Bruce Lee Entertainment to produce Bruce Lee: The Dragon Rises: a present-day, all-ages comedy/action/adventure comic that chronicles the return of the legendary actor, philosopher, teacher, and martial artist.

In January 2018, Darby Pop Publishing announced another collaboration with Bruce Lee Entertainment: Bruce Lee: The Walk of the Dragon by Nicole Dubuc (Star Wars: Rebels, My Little Pony, Transformers: Rescue Bots).

In 2017, Darby Pop Publishing went independent and, over the next two years, released Things You Shouldn't Remember by Luis Roldan, Bastard's Waltz by Mark Bertolini, Santa Claus: Private Eye by Jeremy Bernstein, and Frank N. Stein: Private Eye by Keith Champagne.
