= James Horan (actor) =

American character actor (born 1954)

- Occupation: Actor
- Years active: 1981–present
- Spouse: Stefania Bronzoni (m. 2005)
- Website: jameshoran.com

James Horan is an American character actor.

== History ==
Horan has appeared in many television programs and films. He has starred in several soap operas, including Guiding Light as Detective Kirk Winters in 1980–1981, Another World as Denny Hobson (1981–1982), General Hospital as Brett Madison (1985–1987), and All My Children as Creed Kelly (1988–1989). In 1982, Horan subbed for Larkin Malloy who had been injured in a car accident, playing Sky Whitney on The Edge of Night while Malloy recuperated. Years later, Horan originated the role of Clay Alden on Loving, playing that part from 1989 to 1991. When the role was recast several years later, Malloy assumed the role.

Horan also appeared in four of the Star Trek spin-off series. He appeared twice in Star Trek: The Next Generation in 1993, first in the episode "Suspicions", and later in the episode "Descent, Part II". In 1997, he appeared on Star Trek: Voyager in the episode "Fair Trade" and on Star Trek: Deep Space Nine n the episodes "In Purgatory's Shadow" and "By Inferno's Light". Horan had a recurring role in the first two seasons of Star Trek: Enterprise as the enigmatic figure whom fans called "Future Guy".

Horan's television guest appearances include roles on Werewolf, Remington Steele, Zorro, Melrose Place, Lost and Highlander: The Series. He appeared on a season 6 episode of 24.

In addition to his television and film work, Horan has provided voices for several video games, including several Star Trek and Star Wars games. He also provided the voice for the antagonist Skull Face in Metal Gear Solid V: The Phantom Pain. In 2012, he appeared as the sheriff in commercials for 5-hour Energy.

== Filmography ==
=== Film ===
Year	Title	Role	Notes
2008	Dying God	Sean Fallon	
2008	Immigrants	Additional characters (voice)	English dub
2011	Night of the Living Carrots	Dr. Cockroach (voice)	Short
2013	Transformers Prime Beast Hunters: Predacons Rising	Wheeljack (voice)	Television film
2014	Monster High: Frights, Camera, Action!	Lord Stoker (voice)	Television film

- An Old Man's Gold – Monte
- Chattanooga Choo Choo – Mason
- Flags of Our Fathers – NYC Reporter
- Scanner Cop – Melvin
- Sunset Bar – Victor
- The Visitation – Tall Man

=== Television ===
Year	Title	Role	Notes
1993	Star Trek: The Next Generation	Dr. Jo'Bril & Lieutenant Barnaby	2 episodes Suspicions, Descent
1994	Baywatch	John Mathers	Episode: "The Falcon Manifesto"
1996	Walker, Texas Ranger	Kyle Ganz	Episode: "Miracle at Middle Creek"
1997	Star Trek: Voyager	Tosin	Episode: "Fair Trade"
1997	Star Trek: Deep Space Nine	Ikat'ika	2 episodes
1999–2000	Roughnecks: Starship Troopers Chronicles	Corporal Richard 'Doc' LeCroix	13 episodes
1999	V.I.P.	Smith	Episode: "Raging Val"
1999	Godzilla: The Series	Professor Kasam (voice)	Episode: "Protector"
2001–2003	Star Trek: Enterprise	Humanoid Figure	6 Episodes
2003	The Grim Adventures of Billy & Mandy	Narrator, Cowboy, Show Host (voice)	Episode: "The Crawling Niceness/Smarten Up!/The Grim Show"
2003	Spider-Man: The New Animated Series	Henchmen (voice)	Episode: "Sword of Shikata"
2004	Charmed	Crill	Episode: "Crimes & Witch Demeanors"
2005	What's New, Scooby-Doo?	Dr. Fleg, Bandit (voice)	Episode: "Go West, Young Scoob"
2005	Lost	Wayne	Episode: "What Kate Did"
2007	24	General Walsh	Episode: "Day 6: 7:00 p.m.-8:00 p.m."
2010	Generator Rex	Dr. Fell, Fortier (voice)	Episode "Promises, Promises"
2011–2013	Transformers: Prime	Wheeljack, Insecticon #1 (voice)	17 episodes
2011	Sym-Bionic Titan	Hobbs (voice)	Episode: "Escape from Galaluna"
2016	Turbo Fast	Sheriff McGillicuddy, Worker Snail #2, Hamster (voice)	2 episodes
2016	Lastman	Additional voices	Episode: "Restez avec nous sur PaxNews"
2019	Love, Death & Robots	Major Reyner (voice)	Episode: "Shape-Shifters"

- All My Children – Creed Kelly
- Another World – Denny Hobson
- Criminal Minds – Mark Davis (Episode: "No Way Out")
- Dynasty – Maxwell Allen (Episode: "The Secret")
- General Hospital – Brett Madison
- Guiding Light – Detective Kirk Winters
- Highlander: The Series – Grayson (Episode: "Band of Brothers")
- Hunter – Savarino
- Melrose Place – Kimberly's Attorney (Episode: "Blind Ambition")
- Romance Theatre – Jake Jordan
- Loving – Clay Alden #1
- Remington Steele – Jeff (Episode: "Red Holt Steele")
- The Commish – Hector Bolchek (Episode: "Sleep of the Just")
- The Dukes of Hazzard – Garrett (Episode: "Farewell, Hazzard")
- The Edge of Night – Schuyler "Sky" Whitney
- The Young and the Restless – Mystery Man
- Werewolf – Ray (Episode: "Blood Ties")
- Zorro – Don Gilberto Risendo

=== Video games ===
Year	Title	Voice role	Notes
2000	Baldur's Gate II: Shadows of Amn	Lord Logan Coprith, Grand Dule Belt, Kayl, Male voice 1	
2000	Freedom: First Resistance	Crazy Larry, Zombie 1, Paul PK, Doug Zombie	
2000	Timeline		
2000	Star Trek: Klingon Academy	Academy Marine Commander, Starbase 4, Wingman 2, additional voices	
2001	The Mummy Returns	Rick O'Connell	
2001	Star Wars: Galactic Battlegrounds	Boss Gallo	
2001	Tom Clancy's Ghost Recon	Additional voices	
2002	La Pucelle Tactics	Noire, Hermes	
2002	New Legends	Talos, DS #2, Kuun	
2002	The Sum of All Fears		
2002	Summoner 2	Tabarmo, Mas Raldo, Medevan Knight	
2002	Red Faction II	Male 3	
2002	Star Trek: Starfleet Command III	Additional voices	
2002	The Lord of the Rings: The Fellowship of the Ring	Gimli, Boromir, Bill Ferny	
2003	Freelancer		
2003	Arc the Lad: Twilight of the Spirits	Darkham	
2003	Lionheart		
2003	Star Wars: Knights of the Old Republic	Rickard Lusoff, Gerlon Two Fingers	
2003	Lionheart: Legacy of the Crusader		
2003	Jet Li: Rise to Honor		
2003	SOCOM II U.S. Navy SEALs	Euro Merc	
2003	Ratchet & Clank: Going Commando	Slim Cognito, additional voices	
2003	The Hobbit	Smaug	
2003	Battlestar Galactica	Older Adama	
2004	Gungrave: Overdose	Denito Creale Corsione, Guido Boltoni	English Dub
2004	Onimusha Blade Warriors	Jubei Yagyu	English Dub
2004	The Punisher	Larry, Iron Man, Crack Dealer	
2004	Van Helsing	Villager	
2004	Shellshock: Nam '67	Red Horn, US Soldiers, Pilots and Prisoners #9	
2004	Ratchet & Clank: Up Your Arsenal	Slim Cognito	
2004	EverQuest II	Banker Vertbridge, Scribe Papilius Ahala; Defender Branos, additional voices	
2004	Star Wars Knights of the Old Republic II: The Sith Lords	Coorta Thug, Mercenary Commander, Royalist Corporal	
2005	Samurai Western	Gunman 2, Jean-Jacques Wilson	English Dub
2005	Advent Rising	Admiral Torn	
2005	Killer7	Jean DePaul	English Dub
2005	SOCOM 3 U.S. Navy SEALs	SKYTOP	
2005	Age of Empires III	Major Ryan Cooper	
2005	SOCOM U.S. Navy SEALs: Fireteam Bravo	SKYTOP	
2005	The Matrix: Path of Neo	Agent White, additional voices	
2005	Neopets: The Darkest Faerie	Seradar	
2005	Yakuza	Lau Ka Long	English Dub
2005	Kingdom Hearts II	Scar	English Dub
2006	Syphon Filter: Dark Mirror	Singularity	Credited as Jame Horan
2006	Avatar: The Last Airbender	Additional voices	
2006	Marvel: Ultimate Alliance	Doctor Strange, Ultron, Byrrah	
2006	The Lord of the Rings: The Battle for Middle-earth II: The Rise of the Witch-king	Black Numenoreans	
2006	Microsoft Flight Simulator X	Additional voices	
2007	Kingdom Hearts II Final Mix	Scar	English dub
2007	Avatar: The Last Airbender – The Burning Earth	Long Feng	
2007	Clive Barker's Jericho	Father Paul Rawlings	
2007	Universe at War: Earth Assault	Lord Charos	
2007	The Golden Compass	Lee Scoresby, Dr. Lanselius, Bear	
2007	No More Heroes	Harvey Moiseiwitsch Volodarskii	English dub
2008	Destroy All Humans! Path of the Furon	Saxon	
2009	Monsters vs. Aliens	Dr. Cockroach Ph.D.	
2009	Batman: Arkham Asylum	Jack Ryder, Henchman, Masked Orderly	
2009	Uncharted 2: Among Thieves	Serbian Soldiers	
2009	James Cameron's Avatar: The Game	RDA	
2009	The Saboteur	Eckhardt, Hicks	
2009	Warhammer 40,000: Dawn of War II	Avitus / Gutrencha / Warp Spider Exarchs	
2010	Warhammer 40,000: Dawn of War II – Chaos Rising	Avitus, Devastator Marine, Warpspider, Chaos Dreadnought	
2010	Command & Conquer 4: Tiberian Twilight	GDI Advisor	
2010	Fallout: New Vegas	The King	
2011	Warhammer 40,000: Dawn of War II – Retribution	Chaos Dreadnought, Warp Spider Exarch, Ork Nob	
2011	F.E.A.R. 3	Additional voices	
2011	Ace Combat: Assault Horizon	President Hamilton	English Dub
2011	Batman: Arkham City	Jack Ryder, Inmates, Thugs	
2011	Jurassic Park: The Game	Barney, Dr. Sorkin's Assistant	
2012	Kingdoms of Amalur: Reckoning	Additional voices	
2012	Diablo III	Ithereal	
2012	Guild Wars 2	Additional voices	
2013	Infinity Blade III	Additional voices	
2013	Skylanders: Swap Force	Cluck	
2013	Lego Marvel Super Heroes	Doctor Strange	
2013	Batman: Arkham Origins	Jack Ryder	Uncredited
2013	Lightning Returns: Final Fantasy XIII	Additional voices	
2014	Hearthstone	Gul'dan	
2014	Metal Gear Solid V: Ground Zeroes	Skull Face	
2014	Smite	Abyssal Knight	
2014	Diablo III: Reaper of Souls	Ithereal	
2014	Civilization: Beyond Earth	ADVISR	
2015	Lego Jurassic World	Digger	
2015	Batman: Arkham Knight	Jack Ryder	
2015	Metal Gear Solid V: The Phantom Pain	Skull Face	
2015	Skylanders: SuperChargers	Cluck	
2016	World of Warcraft: Legion		
2018	Red Dead Redemption 2	Additional voices	
2020	Star Trek Online	Noye / Humanoid Figure	
2020	Final Fantasy VII Remake	President Shinra	English dub
2022	Disney Dreamlight Valley	Scar	
2024	Suicide Squad: Kill the Justice League	Jack Ryder	
2024	Batman: Arkham Shadow	Jack Ryder	

- Ace Combat: Assault Horizon – President Hamilton
- Baldur's Gate II: Shadows of Amn – Lord Logan Coprith, Grand Dule Belt, Kayl
- F.E.A.R. 3 – Additional voices
- Kingdoms of Amalur: Reckoning – Additional voices
