= Duane Capizzi =

Italian-American screenwriter

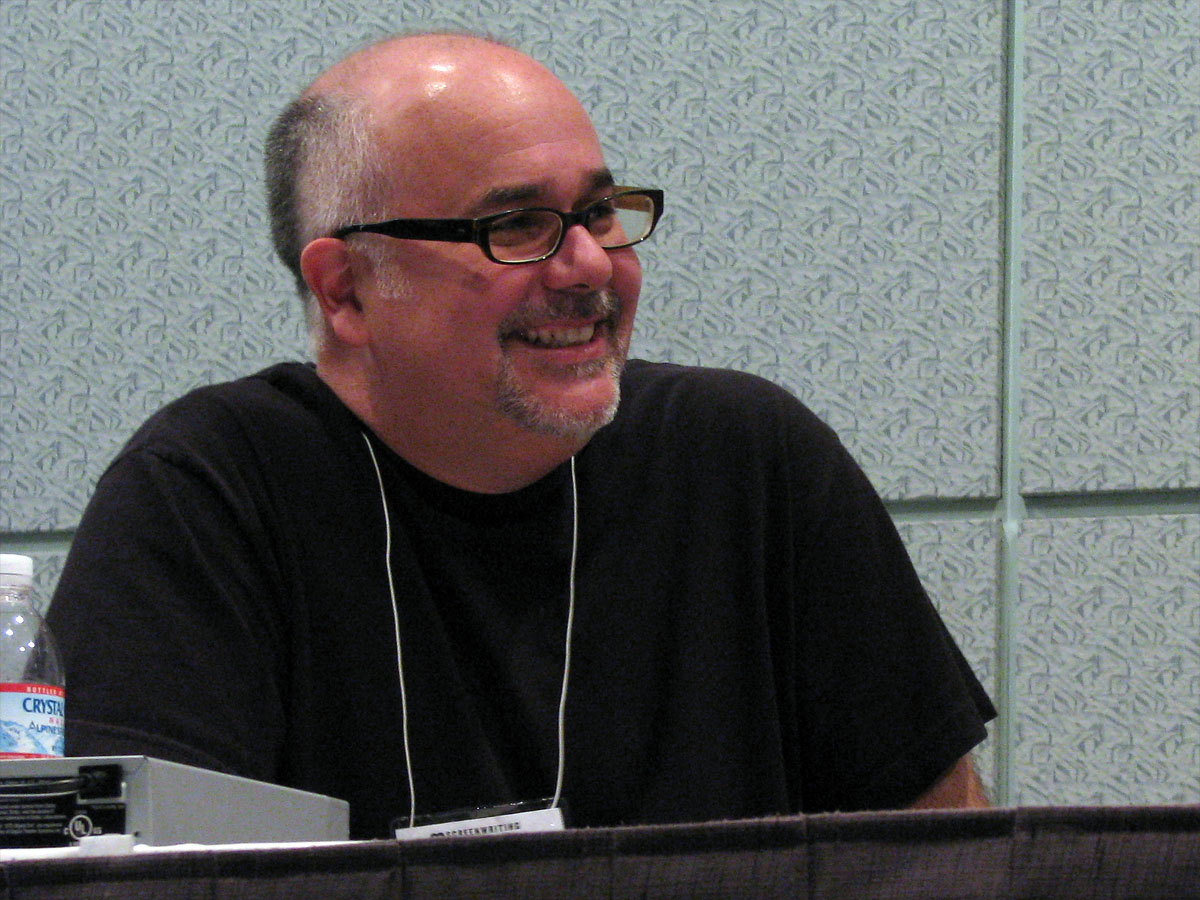
- Capizzi at the 2008 Screenwriting Expo
- Born: U.S.
- Occupations: screenwriter; producer; showrunner
- Years active: 1986-present
- Notable work: Transformers: Prime; Jackie Chan Adventures; The Batman; Carmen Sandiego; Be Cool, Scooby-Doo!; Transformers: Robots in Disguise
- Spouse: Linnea Hemenez (m. 2003)

Duane Capizzi is an American screenwriter and television producer. He is known for his extensive work in animated television series, including the Emmy Award-winning Transformers Prime for which he was Co-Executive Producer and Head Writer, and co-developed its follow-up Transformers: Robots in Disguise. For Warner Bros. Animation, he was the writer and producer of the animated series The Batman as well as its spin-off feature, The Batman vs. Dracula. He wrote the first DC Universe animated feature, Superman: Doomsday (based on The Death of Superman saga, and directed by Bruce Timm).

Other animated series producing/writing credits include Jackie Chan Adventures, Big Guy and Rusty the Boy Robot, Men in Black: The Series, and series which he helped develop on the CG animated Roughnecks: The Starship Troopers Chronicles for Sony Pictures Television. He wrote and story edited for two animated spin-offs of Jim Carrey films: Ace Ventura: Pet Detective and The Mask. He also wrote and story edited for several Disney Afternoon TV series including Darkwing Duck, Aladdin, TaleSpin, and Bonkers. He began his career in animation writing scripts for Robotech II: The Sentinels for Harmony Gold. The series was never produced, but led to writing and story editing on ALF: The Animated Series. From 2019 to 2021, Capizzi served as showrunner for the animated TV series adaptation of Carmen Sandiego.

== Screenwriting credits ==
- series head writer denoted in bold

=== Television ===
- **ALF: The Animated Series** (1987–1989)
- COPS (1988)
- The Real Ghostbusters (1988)
- Teenage Mutant Ninja Turtles (1989)
- Alvin and the Chipmunks (1989)
- Disney's Adventures of the Gummi Bears (1990–1991)
- Talespin (1992)
- Darkwing Duck (1992)
- Bonkers (1993)
- Aladdin (1994)
- The Savage Dragon (1995)
- **Ace Ventura: Pet Detective** (1995–1997)
- **The Mask: Animated Series** (1995–1997)
- Extreme Ghostbusters (1997)
- **Men in Black: The Series** (1997–1999)
- Roughnecks: The Starship Troopers Chronicles (1999–2000)
- **Big Guy and Rusty the Boy Robot** (1999–2001)
- **Jackie Chan Adventures** (2000–2003)
- **The Batman** (2004–2006)
- **Transformers Prime** (2010–2013)
- Hardboiled Eggheads (2014)
- Transformers: Robots In Disguise (2015)
- Be Cool, Scooby-Doo! (2015, 2017)
- Skylanders Academy (2016)
- Justice League Action (2017)
- **Carmen Sandiego** (2019–2021)

=== Films ===
- The Return of Jafar (1994)
- The Batman vs. Dracula (2005)
- Superman: Brainiac Attacks (2006)
- Superman: Doomsday (2007)
- Transformers Prime Beast Hunters: Predacons Rising (2013)
- Lego Scooby-Doo! Haunted Hollywood (2016)
- Carmen Sandiego: To Steal or Not to Steal (2020)

== Producer ==
=== Television ===
- Bonkers (1993)
- The Savage Dragon (1995)
- The Mask: Animated Series (1995–1997)
- Extreme Ghostbusters (1997)
- Men in Black: The Series (1998–2001)
- Big Guy and Rusty the Boy Robot (1999–2001)
- Jackie Chan Adventures (2000–2002)
- The Batman (2004–2008)
- Transformers Prime (2010–2013)
- Hardboiled Eggheads (2014)
- Carmen Sandiego (2019–2021)

=== Features ===
- The Batman vs. Dracula (2005)
- Superman: Brainiac Attacks (2006)
