= Jeff Kline =

American film producer

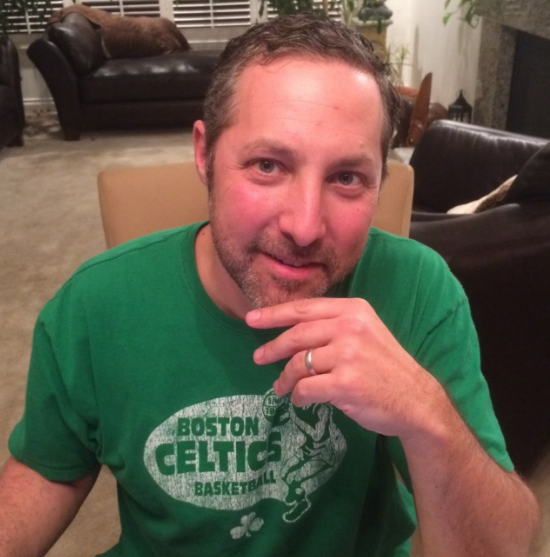
- Kline in 2018
- Born: Boston, Massachusetts
- Education: Boston University's College of Communication
- Occupations: Producer, screenwriter, comics writer
- Years active: 1996–present

Jeff Kline is an American film and television writer-producer and former television executive. He has been involved in more than 40 animated and live-action series and pilots, and he has received multiple Emmy nominations and wins.

== Early life ==
Jeff Kline was born in Boston, Massachusetts. Kline graduated from Boston University's College of Communication in 1987.

== Career ==
After graduating from Boston University, Kline interned at Roger Corman's Concorde/New Horizons and worked in feature development for Michael Shamberg and Harold Ramis's Ocean Pictures. He served as a television executive in Daytime Programming at NBC Entertainment for one year then spent five years at Columbia Pictures Television, eventually serving as the senior vice president of drama before transitioning into writing/producing at the suggestion of his first writing partner, Frank Lupo, co-creator of The A-Team and Wiseguy.

Between 1995 and 2006, he developed or produced the series: My Friends Tigger & Pooh (Playhouse Disney); Jackie Chan Adventures (Kids' WB); Dragon Tales (PBS); Stuart Little: The Animated Series (HBO); That Was Then (ABC); Harold and the Purple Crayon (HBO); Max Steel (Kids WB); Men in Black: The Series (Kids WB); Big Guy and Rusty the Boy Robot (FOX); Roughnecks: Starship Troopers Chronicles (BKN); Godzilla: The Series (FOX); Channel Umptee-3 (Kids WB); Extreme Ghostbusters (BKN); and Jumanji (UPN). In 2001, he left Columbia TriStar Television to form its own independent production company, Brookline Productions, in 2003, signed a first-look deal with The Walt Disney Studios.

From 2006 to 2008, he wrote a Paris Hilton pilot for MTV, and co-wrote the feature film The Rosenbergs Save Christmas (with Goldie Hawn attached to star) for Fox Searchlight.

In 2009 he taught as an adjunct professor at Boston University's College of Communications, and wrote two live-action pilots for SyFy before being recruited to develop and executive-produce Transformers: Prime for Hasbro's then-new cable co-venture with Discovery Communications, The Hub. Kline developed and was executive producer of G.I. Joe: Renegades as well before signing an exclusive four-year series development and production deal with Hasbro Studios in 2011.

He was executive producer of both Transformers: Prime and the first season of Transformers: Rescue Bots. He was an executive producer of Transformers: Robots in Disguise.

In 2013, Kline founded Darby Pop Publishing, a comic book publishing company, and entered into a distribution agreement with IDW. Darby Pop's first title, Indestructible, was created by Kline. The first issue was released in December 2013. Other Darby Pop titles include The 7th Sword, City: the Mind and the Machine, Doberman, and Dead Squad. In October 2015, Darby Pop announced a collaboration with Bruce Lee Entertainment to produce Bruce Lee: The Dragon Rises, co-written by Bruce Lee's daughter Shannon Lee and Kline. In January 2018, Darby Pop announced another collaboration with Bruce Lee Entertainment: Bruce Lee: The Walk of the Dragon by Nicole Dubuc (Star Wars: Rebels, My Little Pony, Transformers: Rescue Bots).

Kline's Darby Pop Productions produced Jingle Bell Rocks, a documentary about Christmas music, distributed by Oscilloscope Laboratories.

In 2018, Kline served as executive producer and head writer on a new series of Woody Woodpecker animated shorts for YouTube.

=== Achievements ===
The crew of Transformers Prime Beast Hunters were nominated for a 2014 Daytime Emmy Award for Outstanding Special Class Animated Program for which Jeff Kline was named for his work as executive producer. Transformers Prime Beast Hunters won two Daytime Emmy Awards for Outstanding Individual Achievement in Animation: Jose Lopez for Character Design and Yasuhiro Motoda for Character Animation.

Transformers: Prime won three 2013 Daytime Emmy Awards for Outstanding Individual Achievement in Animation: Arato Kato for Character Animation, Jason Park for Background Design, and Kirk van Wormer for Storyboards.

The series Transformers: Prime won a 2012 Daytime Emmy Award for Outstanding Special Class Animated Program for which Jeff Kline was named for his work as executive producer.

Transformers: Prime was also nominated for six Daytime Emmys in 2011, and won two Outstanding Individual Achievement in Animation Awards for Christophe Vacher's color design and Vince Toyama's background design.

While Kline was executive producer, PBS children's series Dragon Tales was nominated for the Outstanding Children's Animated Program Daytime Emmy in 2001, 2002, and 2003.

Kline's shows have also been nominated for Daytime Emmys in: 2007: My Friends Tigger & Pooh 2002: Jackie Chan Adventures; Harold and the Purple Crayon won for Outstanding Achievement in Main Title Design; Men in Black: The Series won for Outstanding Sound Editing Special Class 2001: Jackie Chan Adventures, Roughnecks: Starship Troopers Chronicles 2000: Men in Black: The Series; Roughnecks: Starship Troopers Chronicles won for Outstanding Sound Editing Special Class.

Jackie Chan Adventures was nominated for an Annie Award in 2003, as was Dragon Tales in 2000. Harold and the Purple Crayon was nominated for a Humanitas Prize in 2002. Max Steel was nominated for the Annie Awards in 2000 and 2001 and for Golden Reel Awards in 2001 and 2002. Men in Black: The Series was nominated for a Kids' Choice Award in 1999 and for Golden Reel Awards in 1998, 1999, and 2002. Roughnecks: Starship Troopers Chronicles was nominated for Golden Reel Awards in 2000 and 2001.

Kline's 2013 film Jingle Bell Rocks!, for which he was an executive producer, was selected for inclusion in several film festivals, including the 2015 Cleveland International Film Festival and the Detroit Institute of Arts Cinetopia Film Festival. Jingle Bell Rocks! was released on DVD for Record Store Day in 2014.

Kline helped start the BU in L.A. industry exchange program. He received the Boston University College of Communication Distinguished Alumnae Award in 2003. In early 2009, Kline taught as an adjunct professor at BU's College of Communications.

== Filmography ==
Year	Title	Credit	Notes	Type
1994	Fortune Hunter	Writer	Series	Live-action
1996	Jumanji	Developed by	Series	Animated
1997	Channel Umptee-3	Producer	Series	Animated
1997	Extreme Ghostbusters	Supervising producer, developed by	Series	Animated
1997–2001	Men in Black: The Series	Co-executive producer, developed by	Series	Animated
1997	Lawless	Producer	Series	Live-action
1998–2001	Godzilla: The Series	Co-executive producer, developed by	Series	Animated
1998–1999	Big Guy and Rusty the Boy Robot	Co-executive producer, developed by	Series	Animated
1999–2005	Dragon Tales	Executive producer	Series	Animated
1999–2000	Roughnecks: Starship Troopers Chronicles	Co-executive producer, developed by	Series	Animated
2000–2005	Jackie Chan Adventures	Executive producer, developed by	Series	Animated
2001	Max Steel	Co-executive producer, developed by	Series	Animated
2001	Harold and the Purple Crayon	Executive producer, developed by	Series	Animated
2001	Electra Woman and Dyna Girl	Executive producer, writer	Pilot	Live-action
2001	Get Ed	Creative consultant	Pilot	Animated
2002	That Was Then	Executive producer, writer	Series	Live-action
2002–2003	Dragon Tales: Let's Start a Band	Executive producer	Special	Animated
2003	Stuart Little	Creative consultant	Series	Animated
2004–2005	Soccer Moms	Executive producer	Pilot	Live-action
2007–2010	My Friends Tigger & Pooh	Executive producer	Series	Animated
2007	Super Sleuth Christmas Movie	Executive producer, story by	Special	Animated
2010–2011	G.I. Joe Renegades	Executive producer, developed by	Series	Animated
2010–2013	Transformers: Prime	Executive producer, developed by	Series	Animated
2012–2016	Transformers: Rescue Bots	Executive producer (season 1), developed by	Series	Animated
2015–2017	Transformers: Robots in Disguise	Executive producer (seasons 1 and 2), developed by	Series	Animated
2018–2022	Woody Woodpecker	Executive producer, head writer	Series	Animated
Cancelled	Magic: The Gathering	Developed by	Series	Animated
