= Arcee =

Transformers character

- Transformers character
- First appearance: The Transformers: The Movie
- Voiced by: Susan Blu, Masako Katsuki, others

In-universe information
- Race: Cybertronian
- Affiliation: Autobot

Arcee is a robot character in the Transformers franchise, an Autobot usually pink in color. She is the franchise's main female Transformer, having made more appearances than any other.

== History ==
Within the Transformers 1980s cartoon, Arcee is a female Autobot warrior who turns into a pink convertible. Her 1980s cartoon depiction is voiced by Susan Blu in English and by Masako Katsuki in Japanese. In the first year of the Transformers brand, Hasbro rejected the notion of female Transformers. While working on the script for The Transformers: The Movie in late 1984, Ron Friedman successfully insisted on the inclusion of at least one female Transformer, which resulted in Arcee. Arcee's appearances in Transformers cartoons were mostly filling the role of a "token female" until Transformers: Prime, which gave her a more distinct personality and a blue color scheme to downplay her stereotypical femininity.

Arcee was initially set to be in the 2007 Transformers film and had a positive fan reaction, but because there was not enough time in the movie to explain the presence of a "female" in a robotic race, she was dropped from the script. Arcee appeared in the film's sequel, Transformers: Revenge of the Fallen as part of a trio of female Transformers, but she was onscreen for only about two minutes before dying. Director Michael Bay stated that she was killed off because he did not like her, saying that his thought process for her inclusion was to "get it out and get it over with". Arcee later made a cameo appearance in Bumblebee before getting a supporting role in Transformers: Rise of the Beasts.

Within the Transformers comic series by IDW Publishing, writer Simon Furman created Spotlight: Arcee, a 2008 story about Arcee's origin as a female Transformer. The story depicts Arcee as having once been genderless, but being forcibly turned female by the mad scientist Jhiaxus. The experiments by Jhiaxus turned Arcee into an insane murderer. This backstory was criticized by writer Mairghread Scott, who described it as sexist. Later stories within the comic series, written primarily by John Barber and Jenevieve Frank, expand upon Arcee's backstory by establishing that she is a trans woman and that her insanity was caused because of post-treatment medical abuse, not because she was turned female. Within the comic series she is also in a lesbian relationship with the Autobot Aileron.

== See also ==
- List of fictional lesbian characters
- List of fictional transgender characters
