= Unicron =

Transformers character

- Transformers character
- Unicron as depicted in comics by IDW Publishing
- First appearance: The Transformers: The Movie; 1986
- Voiced by: Orson Welles, Colman Domingo, others

Unicron is a fictional villain from the Transformers media franchise. Designed by Floro Dery, he first appears in the 1986 animated film The Transformers: The Movie and has since reappeared in other Transformers media. In the franchise, he is depicted as an evil god-like being that can transform into a giant mechanical planet.

== Fictional character biography ==
According to the Transformers lore, Unicron was created by a god known as the One so that he could explore the universe in its early stages. The One then split Unicron into two, creating the god Primus as the good twin brother of the evil Unicron. The two went to war, with Primus eventually luring Unicron from the astral plane into the physical one, trapping both of them within metallic planets. Primus became Cybertron, the home planet of the Transformers, while Unicron learned to transform his planet form into a giant robot and gain power by consuming planets.

== Development history ==
Unicron makes his debut in the 1986 animated film The Transformers: The Movie. He was designed by illustrator Floro Dery, and his characterization was inspired by the character Galactus from the Marvel Universe. In the film, he transforms the villainous Megatron into Galvatron, who serves as his puppet. Galvatron and Unicron are both ultimately defeated by Rodimus Prime, the successor to Optimus Prime. Rodimus destroys Unicron's body from within and sends his head flying into space. In the film, Unicron is voiced by Orson Welles in his final acting role. Welles recorded his lines as Unicron on October 5, 1985, and died five days later on October 10. Film historian Joseph McBride quoted Welles as being dismissive of his role, saying, "I play a planet. I menace somebody called Something-or-other. Then I'm destroyed."

Unicron appears again in the live-action film Transformers: The Last Knight. This film establishes that Unicron actually resides dormant within the core of the planet Earth. The villain Quintessa plans to drain energy from Unicron in order to rebuild Cybertron. Because The Last Knight was the final film in the original live-action film series, this plot point goes unresolved.

Unicron appears again as the main villain in the reboot film Transformers: Rise of the Beasts. This film retcons his appearance in The Last Knight. In Rise of the Beasts, Unicron is a cosmic god that destroys the home planet of the Maximal faction of Transformers in order to find the Transwarp Key, an item he needs in order to move through space. He sends his minions, Scourge and the Terrorcons, to search the universe for the key, with them ultimately tracking the Maximals to Earth. Scourge acquires the Key and opens a portal to Earth to summon Unicron. Optimus Prime ultimately destroys the Key, closing the portal and trapping Unicron in space. In the film, Unicron is voiced by Colman Domingo.
