= List of awards and nominations received by Megan Fox =

Megan Fox awards and nominations
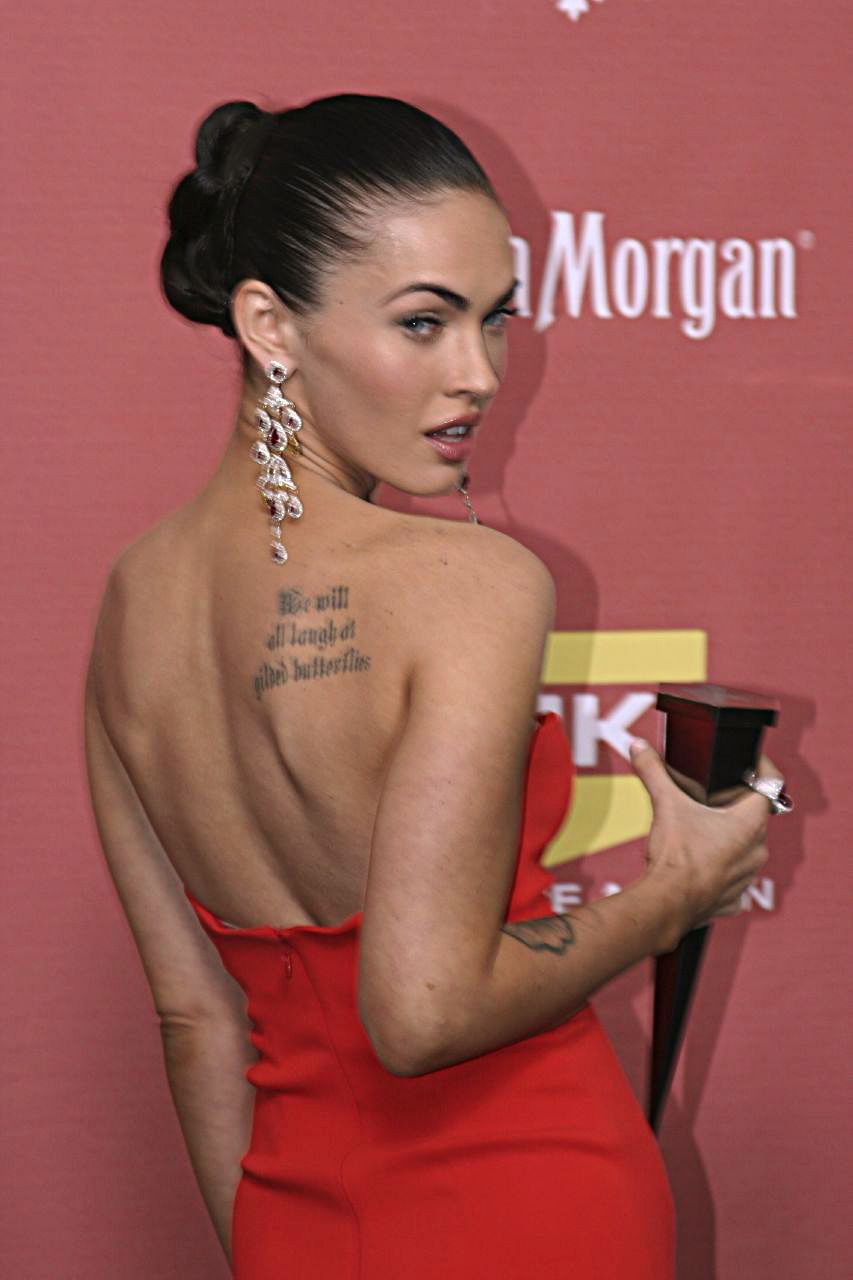
- Fox at the 2007 Scream Awards
Awards and nominations
Award	Wins	Nominations
Alliance of Women Film Journalists	0	1
Golden Raspberry Awards	3	9
Golden Schmoes Awards	2	2
Kids' Choice Awards	0	1
MTV Movie & TV Awards	0	2
National Movie Awards	0	1
People's Choice Awards	0	1
Scream Awards	2	2
Spike Video Game Awards	1	1
Teen Choice Awards	4	10
Young Artist Award	0	1

Totals (Note: Certain award groups do not simply award one winner. They acknowledge several different recipients, have runners-up, and have third place. Since this is a specific recognition and is different from losing an award, runner-up mentions are considered wins in this award tally. For simplification and to avoid errors, each award in this list has been presumed to have had a prior nomination.)
- Wins: 12
- Nominations: 31

Megan Fox is an American actress and model. She rose to prominence with her lead role in the science fiction action film Transformers (2007). Since then, Fox has received numerous awards and nominations, including four Teen Choice Awards and two Scream Awards. She has received seven Golden Raspberry Award nominations, and has won three.

In 2005, Fox received a Young Artist Award nomination for her starring role in the sitcom Hope & Faith (2004–2006). Two years later, her performance as Mikaela Banes in Transformers earned her a Golden Schmoes Award for Best T&A of the Year and a Scream Award for Sci-Fi Siren, as well as nominations for a National Film Award, an MTV Movie & TV Award, and three Teen Choice Awards. She won a Scream Award for Best Science Fiction Actress and a Teen Choice Award for Choice Movie: Summer Actress for her reprisal of Mikaela Banes in the sequel Transformers: Revenge of the Fallen (2009). Fox also won a Spike Video Game Award for Best Performance By A Human Female in the video game adaptation of the film. The same year, she received a nomination from the Alliance of Women Film Journalists for Actress Most in Need of a New Agent.

Fox won a Teen Choice Award for Choice Movie Actress: Horror/Thriller for her performance in the black comedy horror film Jennifer's Body (2009). Her performance as Tallulah Black in the western film Jonah Hex (2010) earned her two Golden Raspberry Award nominations. In 2014, Fox starred as April O'Neil in the superhero film Teenage Mutant Ninja Turtles. Although she won a Golden Raspberry Award for Worst Supporting Actress, she also received a Kids' Choice Award nomination for Favorite Movie Actress for her performance. She reprised the role in the sequel Teenage Mutant Ninja Turtles: Out of the Shadows (2016), where she received a Kids' Choice Award and a Golden Raspberry Award nomination. She was nominated again for a Golden Raspberry Award for her role in the 2021 film Midnight in the Switchgrass. Outside of her work in film, Fox has been nominated for four Teen Choice Awards for her fashion.

== Awards and nominations ==
Award	Year	Nominee/work	Category	Result	Ref(s)
Alliance of Women Film Journalists	2009	Megan Fox	Actress Most in Need of a New Agent	Nominated	
Golden Raspberry Awards	2010	Jennifer's Body	Worst Actress	Nominated	
Golden Raspberry Awards	2010	Transformers: Revenge of the Fallen	Worst Actress	Nominated	
Golden Raspberry Awards	2010	Transformers: Revenge of the Fallen	Worst Screen Combo (Note: Fox and her co-star Shia LaBeouf were nominated as "Shia Lebouf & Either Megan Fox or Any Transformer".)	Nominated	
Golden Raspberry Awards	2011	Jonah Hex	Worst Actress	Nominated	
Golden Raspberry Awards	2011	Jonah Hex	Worst Screen Combo (Note: Fox and her co-star Josh Brolin were nominated as "Josh Brolin's Face & Megan Fox's Accent".)	Nominated	
Golden Raspberry Awards	2015	Teenage Mutant Ninja Turtles	Worst Supporting Actress	Won	
Golden Raspberry Awards	2017	Teenage Mutant Ninja Turtles: Out of the Shadows	Worst Actress	Nominated	
Golden Raspberry Awards	2022	Midnight in the Switchgrass	Worst Actress	Nominated	
Golden Raspberry Awards	2024	Johnny & Clyde	Worst Actress	Won	
Golden Raspberry Awards	2024	Expend4bles	Worst Supporting Actress	Won	
Golden Raspberry Awards	2025	Subservience	Razzie Redeemer	Nominated	
Golden Schmoes Awards	2007	Transformers	Best T&A of the Year	Won	
Golden Schmoes Awards	2009	Jennifer's Body	Best T&A of the Year	Runner-up (Note: Fox was runner-up to Malin Åkerman, who starred as Laurie Jupiter / Silk Spectre II in Watchmen.)	
Kids' Choice Awards	2010	Transformers: Revenge of the Fallen	Favorite Movie Actress	Nominated	
Kids' Choice Awards	2015	Teenage Mutant Ninja Turtles	Favorite Movie Actress	Nominated	
Kids' Choice Awards	2017	Teenage Mutant Ninja Turtles: Out of the Shadows	Favorite Movie Actress	Nominated	
MTV Movie & TV Awards	2008	Transformers	Breakthrough Performance	Nominated	
MTV Movie & TV Awards	2010	Jennifer's Body	Best WTF Moment (Note: The WTF moment was: "Megan Fox projectile vomits on Amanda Seyfried. Spitacular.")	Nominated	
National Movie Awards	2007	Transformers	Best Performance by a Female	Nominated	
People's Choice Awards	2010	Transformers: Revenge of the Fallen	Favorite On-Screen Team (Note: Fox was nominated for the award with LaBeouf.)	Nominated	
Scream Awards	2007	Transformers	Sci-Fi Siren	Won	
Scream Awards	2009	Transformers: Revenge of the Fallen	Best Science Fiction Actress	Won	
Spike Video Game Awards	2009	Transformers: Revenge of the Fallen	Best Performance By A Human Female	Won	
Teen Choice Awards	2007	Megan Fox	Choice Hottie: Female	Nominated	
Teen Choice Awards	2007	Transformers	Choice Movie: Actress – Action	Nominated	
Teen Choice Awards	2007	Transformers	Choice Movie: Breakout Actress	Nominated	
Teen Choice Awards	2007	Transformers	Choice Movie: Liplock (Note: Fox was nominated for the award with LaBeouf.)	Nominated	
Teen Choice Awards	2009	Megan Fox	Choice Hottie: Female	Won	
Teen Choice Awards	2009	Transformers: Revenge of the Fallen	Choice Movie: Summer Actress	Won	
Teen Choice Awards	2010	Megan Fox	Choice Hottie: Female	Won	
Teen Choice Awards	2010	Jennifer's Body	Choice Movie Actress: Horror/Thriller	Won	
Teen Choice Awards	2013	Megan Fox	Choice Hottie: Female	Nominated	
Teen Choice Awards	2016	Teenage Mutant Ninja Turtles: Out of the Shadows	Choice Movie: Summer Actress	Nominated	
Young Artist Award	2005	Hope & Faith	Best Performance in a TV Series (Comedy or Drama) – Supporting Young Actress	Nominated	
