= 44th Golden Raspberry Awards =

Award ceremony for worst in film in 2023

- Awarded for: Worst in film
- Date: March 9, 2024
- Site: Los Angeles, California

Highlights
- Worst Picture: Winnie-the-Pooh: Blood and Honey
- Most awards: Winnie-the-Pooh: Blood and Honey (5)
- Most nominations: Expend4bles (7)

The 44th Golden Raspberry Awards, or the Razzies, honored the worst the film industry had to offer in 2023 on March 9, 2024. The awards are based on votes from members of the Golden Raspberry Award Foundation (1,179 movie buffs, film critics and journalists from 49 US States, and two dozen foreign countries). The nominations were announced on January 22, 2024. Additionally, with four nods, Ant-Man and the Wasp: Quantumania earned the Marvel Cinematic Universe (MCU) its first-ever Razzie nominations, breaking the franchise's 16-year streak without a single Razzie Award nomination.

In August 2023, a statement by John J. B. Wilson and Maureen Murphy announced that the Golden Raspberry Award Foundation was considering the possibility of setting a new precedent by awarding Walt Disney Studios the Barry L. Bumstead Award to an entire studio for the first time ever (and not just to an individual theatrical film); ultimately, the award was not presented. This was due to the studio's centennial anniversary releases (e.g. Ant-Man and the Wasp: Quantumania, Elemental, Haunted Mansion, Indiana Jones and the Dial of Destiny, The Little Mermaid, The Marvels, Peter Pan & Wendy, and Wish) causing "the once phenomenally profitable Walt Disney Pictures [to suffer] failure after failure at the box office" when "corporate honchos had hoped to spend th[e] entire year celebrating a century of success".

Upon learning of Winnie-the-Pooh: Blood and Honey sweeping every award it was nominated for, the film's writer-director (Rhys Frake-Waterfield) reacted in an interview for Variety, stating: "I'm surprised our micro-budget film is being compared to Hollywood, but nevertheless I don't mind the dubious honor as it places me in the same pool as directors whose work I admire so much." Producer Scott Chambers also chimed in with his reaction, saying: "I think it is something to celebrate. But yeah, I'm always a little bit protective of Rhys because obviously he's so early on in his career where the others, David Gordon Green and stuff that were in his category, they've got a solid career whereas Rhys is so early. And I feel like the director one was probably the one I disagree with the most, but the others, I'm like, 'Yeah, whatever.' Do you know what I mean? It is what it is and it's fine."

== Winners and nominees ==
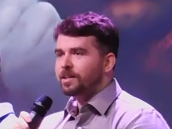
Rhys Frake-Waterfield, Worst Picture co-winner, and Worst Director and Worst Screenplay winner

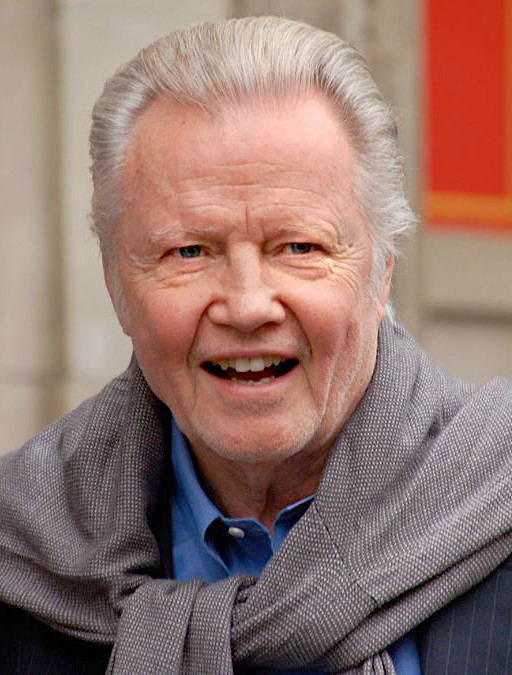
Jon Voight, Worst Actor winner

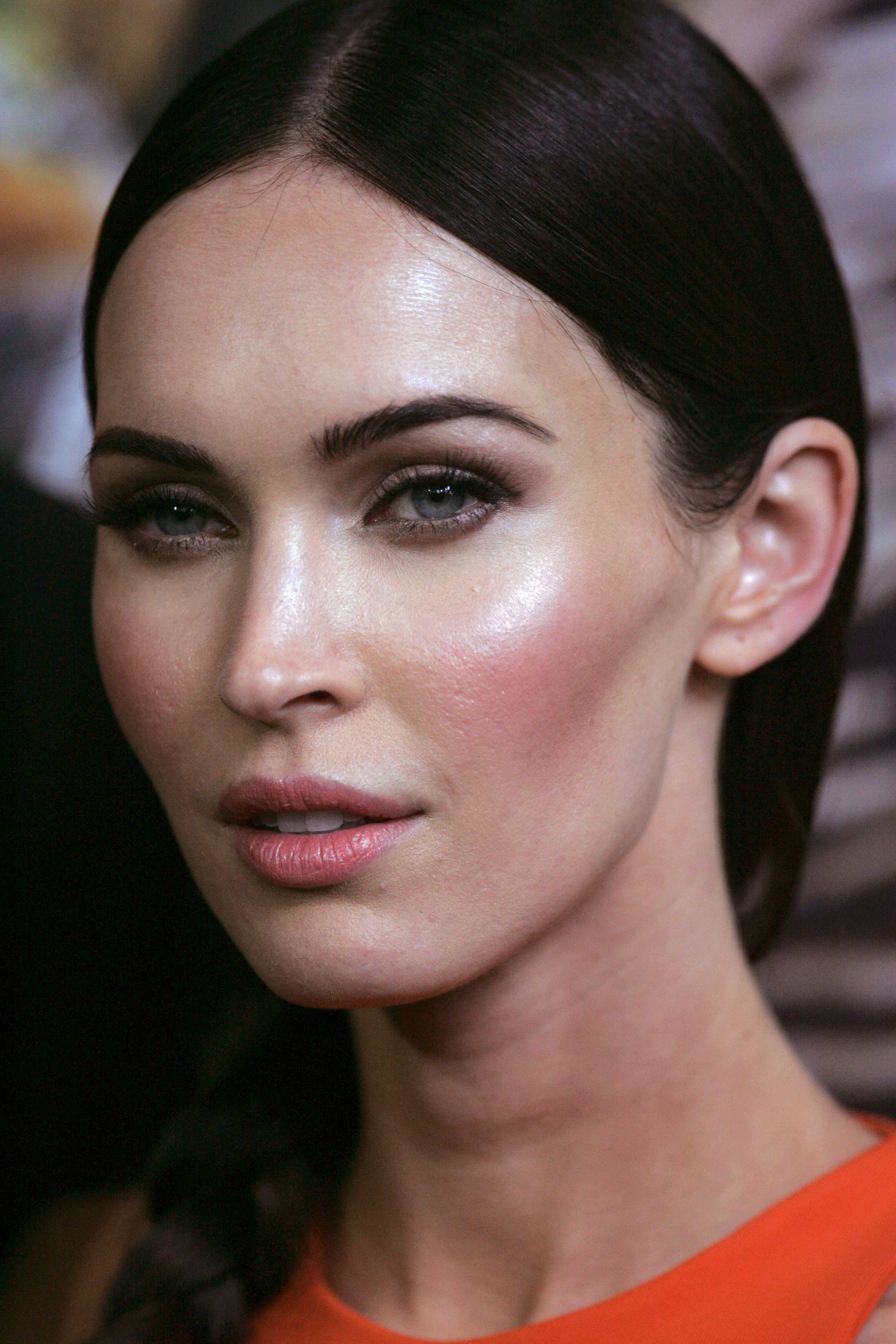
Megan Fox, Worst Actress and Worst Supporting Actress winner

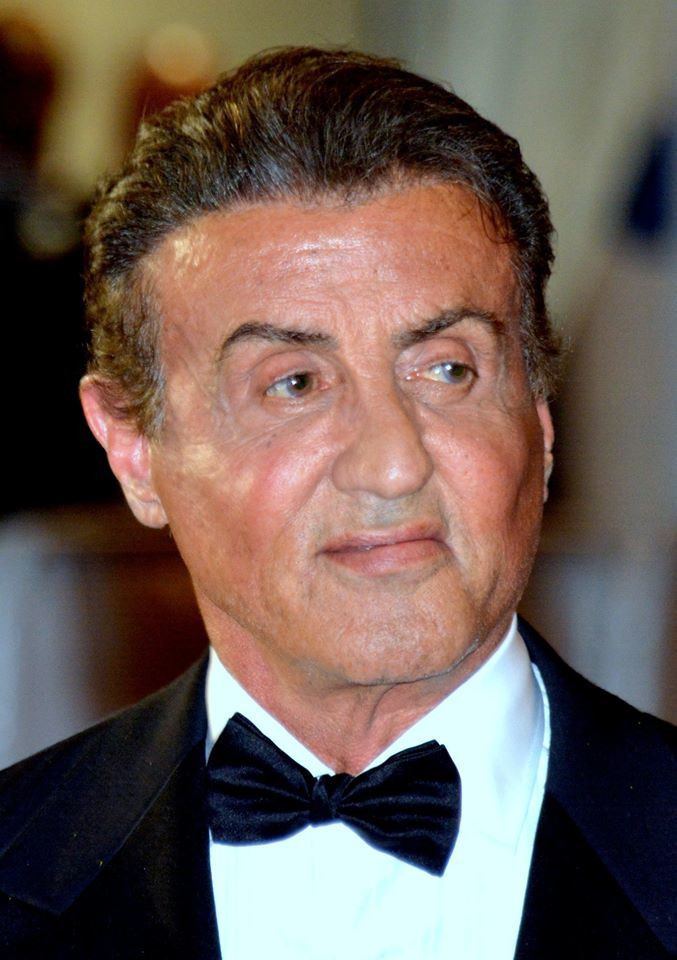
Sylvester Stallone, Worst Supporting Actor winner

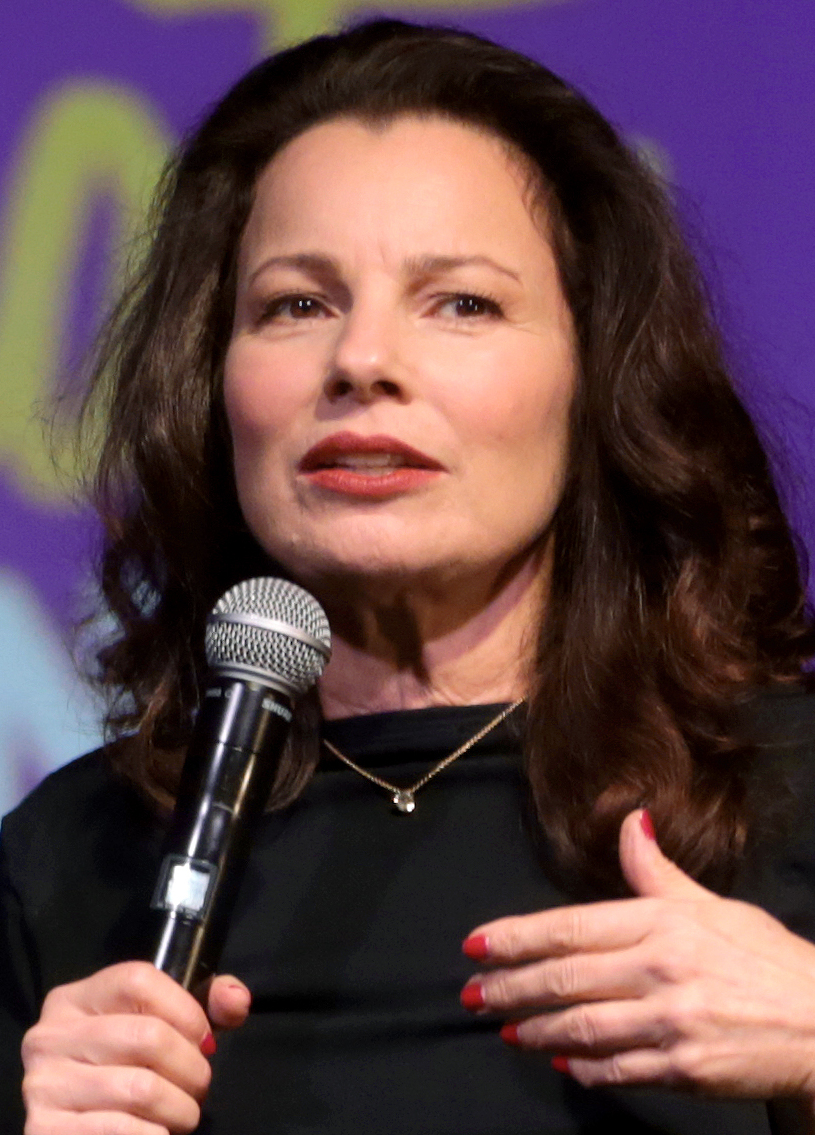
Fran Drescher, Razzie Redeemer Award winner

Worst Picture: Winnie-the-Pooh: Blood and Honey (Altitude Film Distribution) – Scott Chambers and Rhys Frake-Waterfield; The Exorcist: Believer (Universal) – Jason Blum, David C. Robinson, and James G. Robinson; Expend4bles (Lionsgate) – Kevin King-Templeton, Les Weldon, Yariv Lerner, and Jason Statham; Meg 2: The Trench (Warner Bros.) – Lorenzo di Bonaventura and Belle Avery; Shazam! Fury of the Gods (Warner Bros.) – Peter Safran	Worst Director: Rhys Frake-Waterfield – Winnie-the-Pooh: Blood and Honey; David Gordon Green – The Exorcist: Believer; Peyton Reed – Ant-Man and the Wasp: Quantumania; Scott Waugh – Expend4bles; Ben Wheatley – Meg 2: The Trench
Worst Actor: Jon Voight – Mercy as Patrick Quinn; Russell Crowe – The Pope's Exorcist as Father Gabriele Amorth; Vin Diesel – Fast X as Dominic Toretto; Chris Evans – Ghosted as Cole Turner; Jason Statham – Meg 2: The Trench as Jonas Taylor	Worst Actress: Megan Fox – Johnny & Clyde as Alana Hart; Ana de Armas – Ghosted as Sadie Rhodes; Salma Hayek – Magic Mike's Last Dance as Maxandra Mendoza; Jennifer Lopez – The Mother as The Mother; Helen Mirren – Shazam! Fury of the Gods as Hespera
Worst Supporting Actor: Sylvester Stallone – Expend4bles as Barney Ross; Michael Douglas – Ant-Man and the Wasp: Quantumania as Hank Pym; Mel Gibson – Confidential Informant as Kevin Hickey; Bill Murray – Ant-Man and the Wasp: Quantumania as Lord Krylar; Franco Nero – The Pope's Exorcist as The Pope	Worst Supporting Actress: Megan Fox – Expend4bles as Gina; Kim Cattrall – About My Father as Tigger; Bai Ling – Johnny & Clyde as Zhang; Lucy Liu – Shazam! Fury of the Gods as Kalypso; Mary Stuart Masterson – Five Nights at Freddy's as Aunt Jane
Worst Screen Combo: Pooh & Piglet as Blood-Thirsty Slasher/Killers (!) – Winnie-the-Pooh: Blood and Honey; Any 2 "Merciless Mercenaries" – Expend4bles; Any 2 Money-Grubbing Investors Who Donated to the $400 Million for Remake Rights to The Exorcist – The Exorcist: Believer; Ana de Armas & Chris Evans (who flunked Screen Chemistry) – Ghosted; Salma Hayek & Channing Tatum – Magic Mike's Last Dance	Worst Remake, Rip-off or Sequel: Winnie-the-Pooh: Blood and Honey (Altitude Film Distribution); Ant-Man and the Wasp: Quantumania (Disney); The Exorcist: Believer (Universal); Expend4bles (Lionsgate); Indiana Jones and the Dial of Destiny (Note: Labeled as Indiana Jones and The Dial of...Still Beating a Dead Horse) (Disney)
Worst Screenplay: Winnie-the-Pooh: Blood and Honey – screenplay by Rhys Frake-Waterfield (based on the book by A. A. Milne and E. H. Shepard); The Exorcist: Believer – screenplay by Peter Sattler and David Gordon Green; story by Scott Teems, Danny McBride, and David Gordon Green (based on characters by William Peter Blatty); Expend4bles – screenplay by Kurt Wimmer, Tad Daggerhart, and Max D. Adams; story by Spenser Cohen, Kurt Wimmer, and Tad Daggerhart (based on characters by David Callaham); Indiana Jones and the Dial of Destiny (Note: Labeled as Indiana Jones and The Dial of...Can I go home now?) – screenplay by Jez Butterworth, John-Henry Butterworth, David Koepp, and James Mangold (based on characters by George Lucas and Philip Kaufman); Shazam! Fury of the Gods – screenplay by Henry Gayden and Chris Morgan (based on characters by DC Comics)	Razzie Redeemer Award: Fran Drescher – 1998 Nominee and current SAG-AFTRA president, "for her brilliant shepherding of the actors' guild through a prolonged 2023 strike with a successful conclusion"

=== Films with multiple nominations ===
The following films received multiple nominations:

Films with multiple nominations
Nominations	Film
7	Expend4bles
5	The Exorcist: Believer
5	Winnie-the-Pooh: Blood and Honey
4	Ant-Man and the Wasp: Quantumania
4	Shazam! Fury of the Gods
3	Ghosted
3	Meg 2: The Trench
2	Indiana Jones and the Dial of Destiny
2	Johnny & Clyde
2	Magic Mike's Last Dance
2	The Pope's Exorcist

=== Films with multiple wins ===
The following films received multiple awards:

Films with multiple awards
Wins	Film
5	Winnie-the-Pooh: Blood and Honey
2	Expend4bles
