= Transformers (film) =

2007 film by Michael Bay

- Theatrical release poster
- Directed by: Michael Bay
- Screenplay by: Roberto Orci; Alex Kurtzman
- Story by: John Rogers; Roberto Orci; Alex Kurtzman
- Based on: Hasbro's Transformers action figures
- Produced by: Lorenzo di Bonaventura; Tom DeSanto; Don Murphy; Ian Bryce
- Starring: Shia LaBeouf; Tyrese Gibson; Josh Duhamel; Anthony Anderson; Megan Fox; Rachael Taylor; John Turturro; Jon Voight
- Cinematography: Mitchell Amundsen
- Edited by: Paul Rubell; Glen Scantlebury; Thomas A. Muldoon
- Music by: Steve Jablonsky
- Production companies: Paramount Pictures; DreamWorks Pictures; Hasbro; di Bonaventura Pictures
- Distributed by: Paramount Pictures (Note: Distributed under the DreamWorks Pictures banner in the United States and Canada, and the Paramount Pictures banner internationally.)
- Release dates: June 10, 2007 (N Seoul Tower); July 3, 2007 (United States)
- Running time: 143 minutes
- Country: United States
- Language: English
- Budget: $145–200 million
- Box office: $709.7 million

Transformers is a 2007 American science fiction action film based on Hasbro's toy line of the same name. Directed by Michael Bay from a screenplay by Roberto Orci and Alex Kurtzman, it is the first installment in the Transformers film series. The film stars Shia LaBeouf as Sam Witwicky, a teenager who gets caught up in a war between the heroic Autobots and the evil Decepticons, two factions of shape-shifting alien robots. The Autobots and Decepticons both seek a powerful artifact called the AllSpark, to win the war that has devastated their home planet of Cybertron. Tyrese Gibson, Josh Duhamel, Anthony Anderson, Megan Fox, Rachael Taylor, John Turturro, and Jon Voight also star, while Peter Cullen and Hugo Weaving voice Optimus Prime and Megatron, respectively.

Don Murphy was initially interested in developing a G.I. Joe film, but then decided to develop a Transformers film after the United States went to war against Iraq in 2003. Murphy and Tom DeSanto developed the project in 2003, and DeSanto wrote a treatment. Steven Spielberg came on board as executive producer the following year, hiring Orci and Kurtzman to write the screenplay. The U.S. Armed Forces and General Motors loaned vehicles and aircraft during filming, which saved money for the production and added realism to the battle scenes. Hasbro's promotional campaign for the film included deals with various companies; advertising included a viral marketing campaign, coordinated releases of prequel comic books, toys, and books, as well as product placement deals with companies such as General Motors, Burger King, and eBay.

It premiered on June 10, 2007, at the N Seoul Tower in Seoul, South Korea, and released by Paramount Pictures in the United States on July 3. The film was a commercial success, grossing $709.7 million worldwide against a production budget of $145–200 million and becoming the fifth-highest-grossing film of 2007. It won four awards from the Visual Effects Society and was nominated for Best Visual Effects, Best Sound Editing, and Best Sound Mixing at the 80th Academy Awards. It was followed by a sequel, Transformers: Revenge of the Fallen (2009).

== Plot ==
The planet Cybertron was ravaged by a civil war between two Transformer factions — the Autobots, led by Optimus Prime, and the Decepticons, led by Megatron. Both search for a lost artifact called the AllSpark, the source of all Cybertronian life. The Autobots want to find the AllSpark to rebuild Cybertron and end the war, while the Decepticons want to use it to conquer the universe. Megatron found the AllSpark on Earth, but crash-landed in the Arctic Circle and was frozen in the ice. Captain Archibald Witwicky and his crew of explorers stumbled upon Megatron in 1897. Captain Witwicky accidentally activates Megatron's navigational system, imprinting his eyeglasses with the coordinates of the AllSpark's location and blinding him permanently. Sector 7, a secret U.S. government organization, discovers the AllSpark in the Colorado River and builds the Hoover Dam around it to mask its energy emissions. The still-frozen Megatron is transported into the facility and is reverse-engineered to advance human technology.

In the present day, the Decepticon Blackout attacks the U.S. SOCCENT military base in Qatar and tries to hack into the U.S. military network to find Megatron and the AllSpark. Still, the base staff thwarts him by severing the network cable connections. While Blackout wrecks the rest of the base, Captain William Lennox, Sergeant Robert Epps, and a small group of survivors escape with photographic evidence of the robots. Back in the United States, Captain Witwicky’s descendant, Sam Witwicky, buys his first car, a 1975 Chevrolet Camaro which turns out to be the Autobot Bumblebee. Bumblebee helps him woo his crush, Mikaela Banes, then leaves at night to transmit a homing beacon to the Autobots, and Sam briefly sees his robot form.

Another Decepticon, Frenzy, infiltrates Air Force One to hack into the military network and, in doing so, plants a virus. He finds the map imprinted on Archibald's glasses, leading him and his partner Barricade to begin tracking Sam's location. The next day, Barricade confronts Sam and demands his grandfather's glasses, but Bumblebee rescues him and Mikaela. Meanwhile, Scorponok, who Blackout sent, goes after Captain Lennox and his team, murdering one of them and injuring another. During the battle, Scorponok is forced to retreat when the Air Force hits him with high-heat sabot rounds, the only effective weapons against the Transformers' armor. Sam and Mikaela soon meet Optimus Prime and his other Autobot comrades, Jazz, Ironhide, and Ratchet. They all return to Sam's home and obtain the glasses. Government agents from Sector 7, led by Seymour Simmons, arrive to arrest Sam and Mikaela and capture Bumblebee after the Autobots try to rescue them.

Frenzy secretly accompanies the group to the Hoover Dam, alerts the other Decepticons to the AllSpark, and releases Megatron. At the same time, Sam convinces the Sector 7 agents to release Bumblebee so he can get the AllSpark to Optimus. Frenzy's virus shuts down the military's communications, but two hackers, Maggie Madsen and Glen Whitmann, manage to alert the Air Force. The Autobot-human convoy goes to Mission City to get a radio to guide the Air Force and secure an extraction for the AllSpark as Decepticon forces attack. Jazz and most of the Decepticons are killed in the ensuing battle, and Sam rams the AllSpark into Megatron's chest as he battles Optimus, killing him and destroying the AllSpark. Optimus takes a fragment of the AllSpark from Megatron's corpse but realizes Cybertron cannot be restored after its destruction. The U.S. government decommissions Sector 7 and sinks the deceased Decepticons into the Laurentian Abyss. Sam and Mikaela begin a relationship, and Optimus sends a signal to other surviving Autobots, directing them to Earth.

== Cast ==
- Shia LaBeouf as Sam Witwicky, the young descendant of an Arctic explorer who stumbles upon a big secret that becomes Earth's last hope.
- Megan Fox as Mikaela Banes, a classmate of Sam who assists him in his mission by using skills she learned as a juvenile car thief from her convict father.
- Josh Duhamel as Captain William Lennox, a dedicated leader of the Army Rangers team in Qatar who allies with Sam.
- Tyrese Gibson as Sergeant Robert Epps, a U.S. Air Force Combat Controller and technical sergeant of a Special Operations team based at the U.S. SOCCENT base in Qatar and Lennox's best friend. Before Gibson was cast, Ashley Walters was approached for the role but had to turn it down as he had already signed a deal to do a small independent film in the UK.
- John Turturro as Agent Major Seymour Simmons, a special agent of the government agency Sector 7 Advanced Research Division.
- Jon Voight as John Keller, the U.S. Secretary of Defense.
- Kevin Dunn as Ron Witwicky, Sam's father.
- Julie White as Judy Witwicky, Sam's mother.
- Rachael Taylor as Maggie Madsen, a former NSA data analyst recruited by the U.S. Defense Department.
- Anthony Anderson as Glen Whitmann, Maggie's hacker friend.
- Michael O'Neill as Tom Banachek, Head of Sector 7.
- Zack Ward as First Sergeant Donnelly, a member of Captain Lennox's team.
- Amaury Nolasco as Jorge "Fig" Figueroa, a Special Operations soldier who survives the destruction of the SOCCENT base in Qatar and was also a member of Captain Lennox's team.
- W. Morgan Sheppard as Captain Archibald Witwicky, Sam's great-great-grandfather who accidentally activates Megatron's navigational system while exploring the Arctic Circle.
- Bernie Mac as Bobby Bolivia, a used car salesman.
- Brian Stepanek as Sector Seven Agent.
- Peter Jacobson as Mr. Hosney, Sam's teacher.
- John Robinson as Miles Lancaster, Sam's best friend.
- Travis Van Winkle as Trent DeMarco, Mikaela's ex-boyfriend.
- Omar Benson Miller as Glenn's cousin.
- Glenn Morshower as Colonel Sharp (credited as "SOCCENT sergeant")
- Sherri Shepherd as Rhonda (IMAX re-release version only)

=== Voices ===
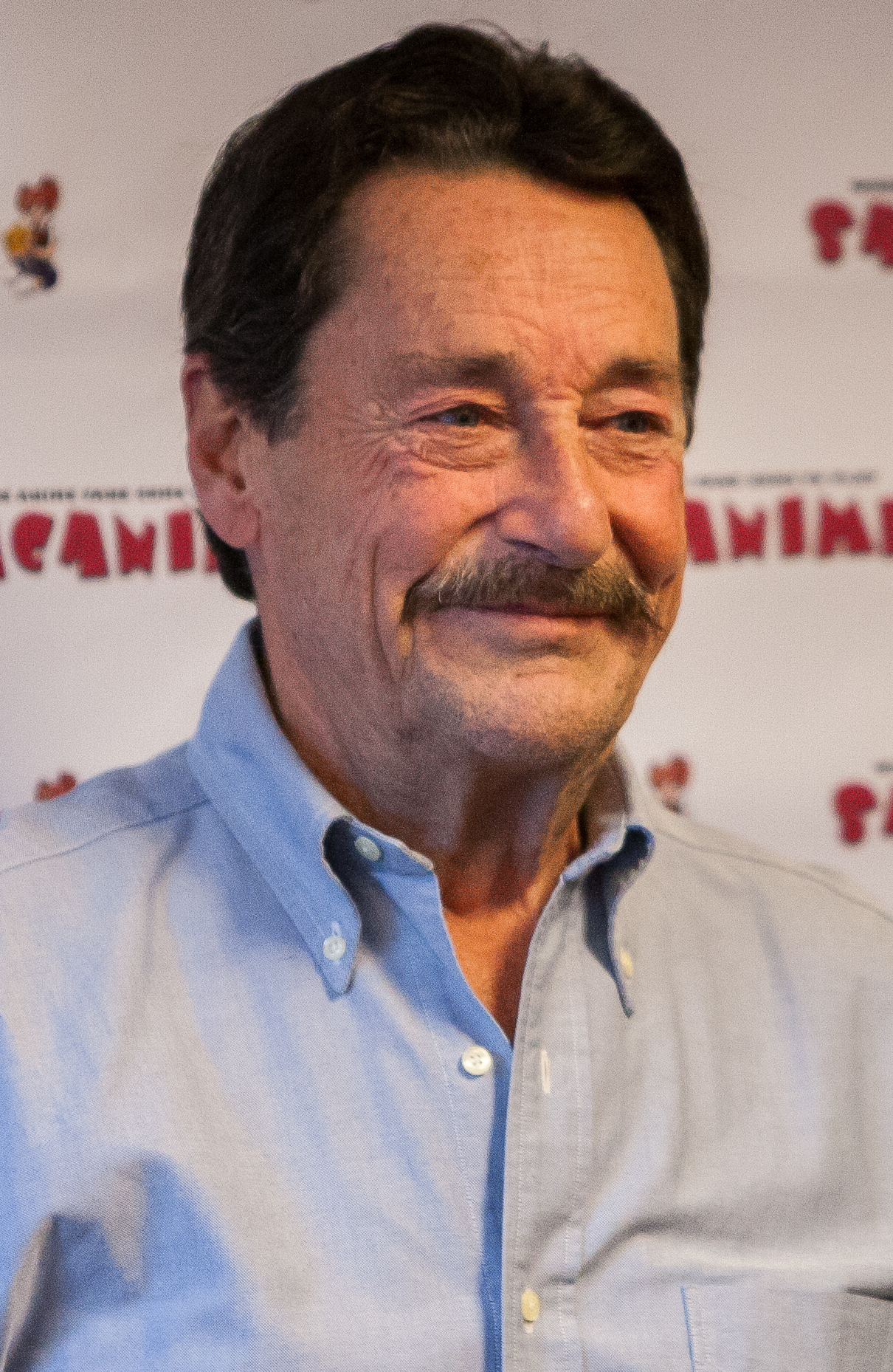
Having previously voiced Optimus Prime in the original 1980s cartoon, Peter Cullen was cast to reprise his role for the first time in nearly twenty years since the conclusion of the series.

- Peter Cullen as Optimus Prime, the leader of the Autobots who transforms into a blue and red 1994 Peterbilt 379 semi-trailer truck.
- Hugo Weaving as Megatron, the leader of the Decepticons who transforms into a silver Cybertronian jet. Frank Welker was considered to reprise his role, but according to the film's DVD commentary, Bay thought his voice did not fit, so Weaving was chosen instead. After Weaving left the role, Welker returned as the voice of Megatron in later sequels.
- Mark Ryan as Bumblebee, the Autobot scout and Sam's new guardian who transforms into a yellow and black Chevrolet Camaro (first a 1976 model and later in the movie a 2007 model).
- Darius McCrary as Jazz, Optimus's second-in-command who transforms into a silver 2006 Pontiac Solstice.
- Robert Foxworth as Ratchet, the Autobot medic who transforms into a green 2007 search and rescue Hummer H2 ambulance.
- Jess Harnell as Ironhide, the Autobot weapons specialist who transforms into a black 2006 GMC Topkick C4500.
  - Harnell also voices Barricade, the Decepticon scout and interrogator who transforms into a black 2007 Saleen S281 police car.
- Charlie Adler as Starscream, Megatron's second-in-command who transforms into a Lockheed Martin F-22 Raptor. Adler had previously voiced several characters in the original series, most noticeably Silverbolt.
- Reno Wilson as Frenzy, the Decepticon hacker and Barricade's minion, who transforms into a PGX Boombox, and later a Nokia N93i. Howard Stern was offered the role, but turned it down when his agent talked him out of it.
- Jim Wood as Bonecrusher, a Decepticon soldier who transforms into a Buffalo H Mine-Protected vehicle.

=== Non-speaking characters ===
- Blackout — Megatron's third-in-command who transforms into a MH-53J Pave Low III helicopter.
- Brawl — the Decepticon demolition specialist who transforms into an up-armed M1A1 Abrams tank.
- Scorponok — a scorpion-like Decepticon and Blackout's minion.
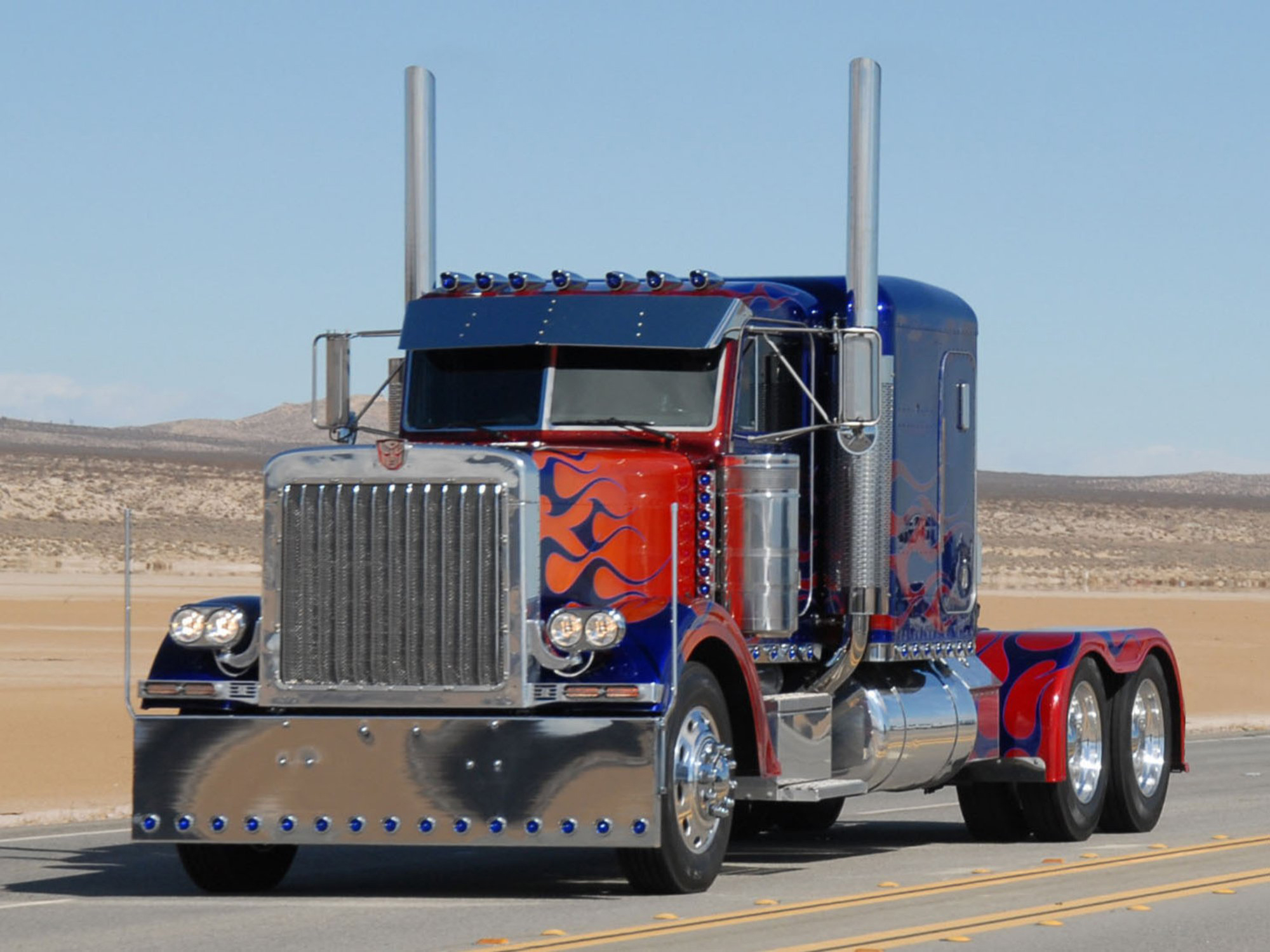
The Peterbilt 379 used to portray Optimus Prime

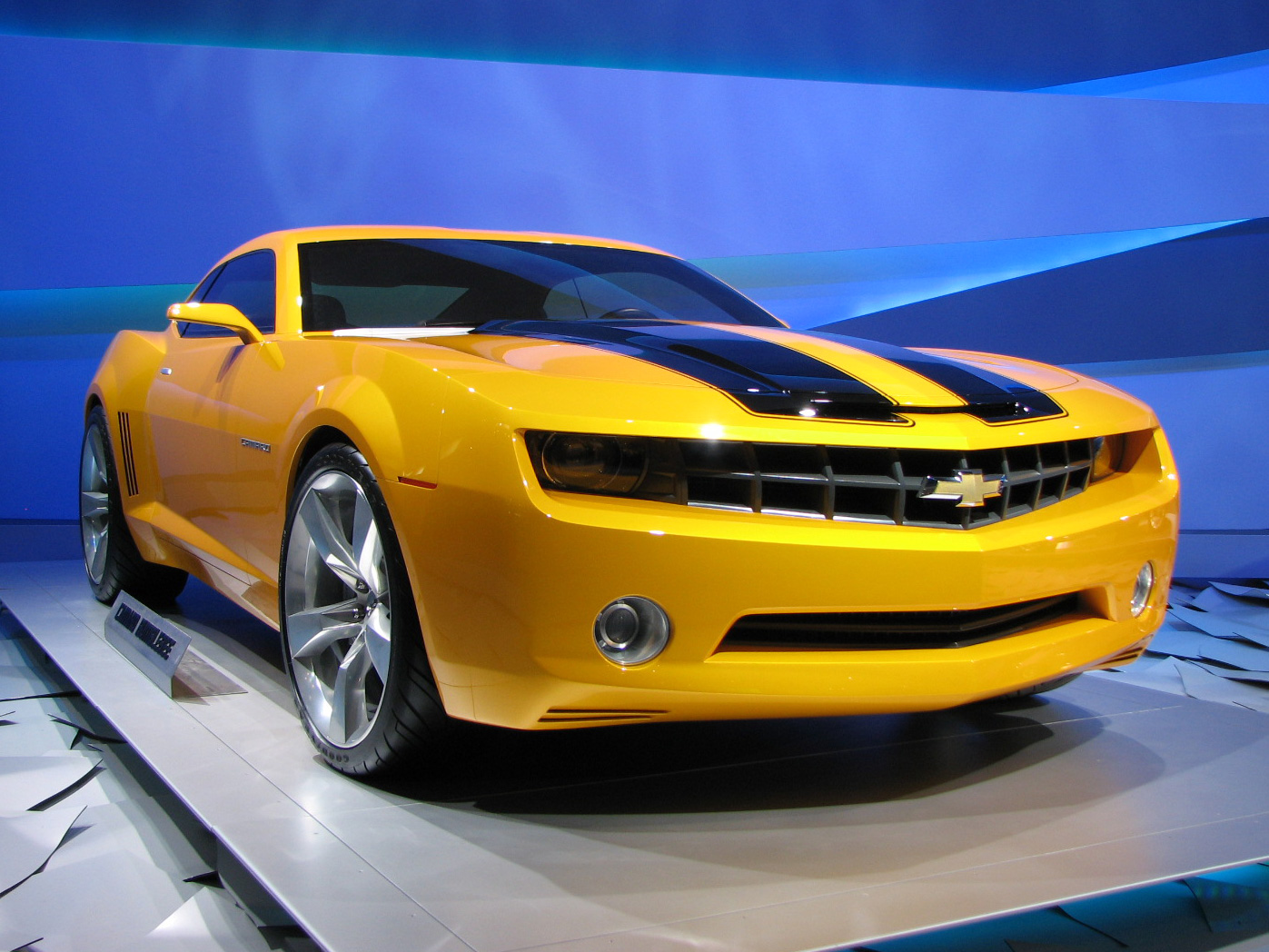
One of the Chevrolet Camaros used to portray Bumblebee

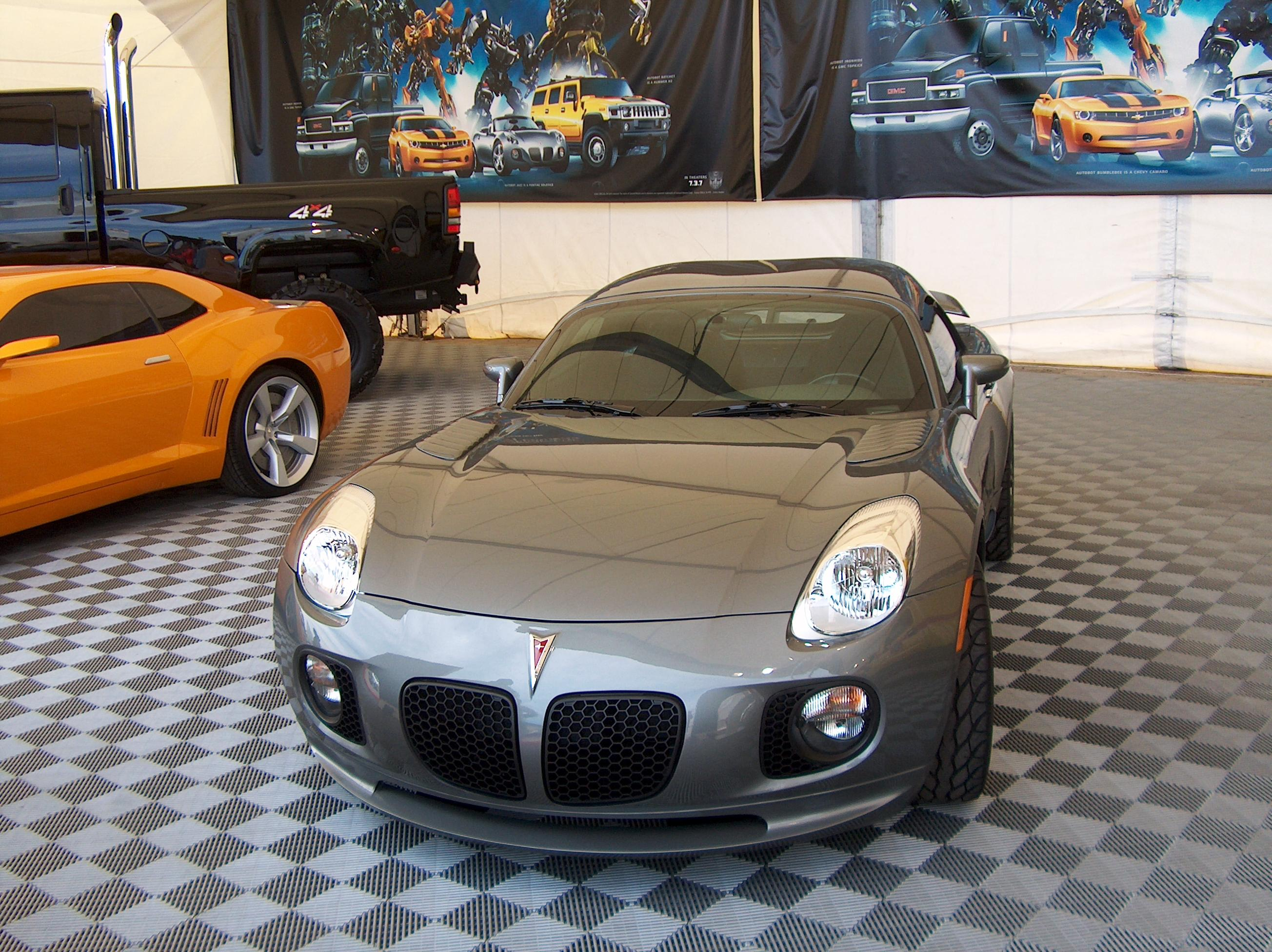
The Pontiac Solstice used to portray Jazz

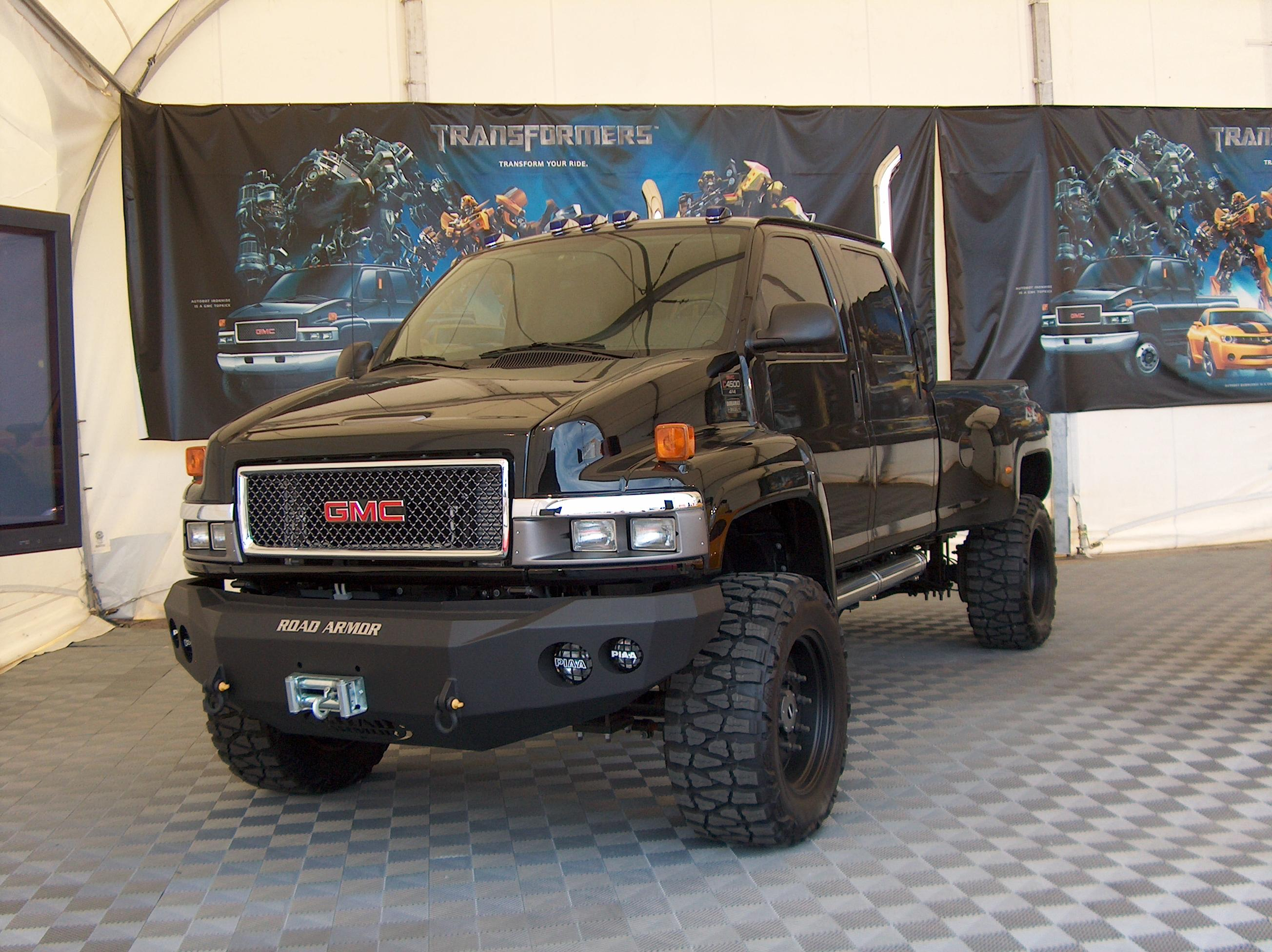
The GMC Topkick used to portray Ironhide

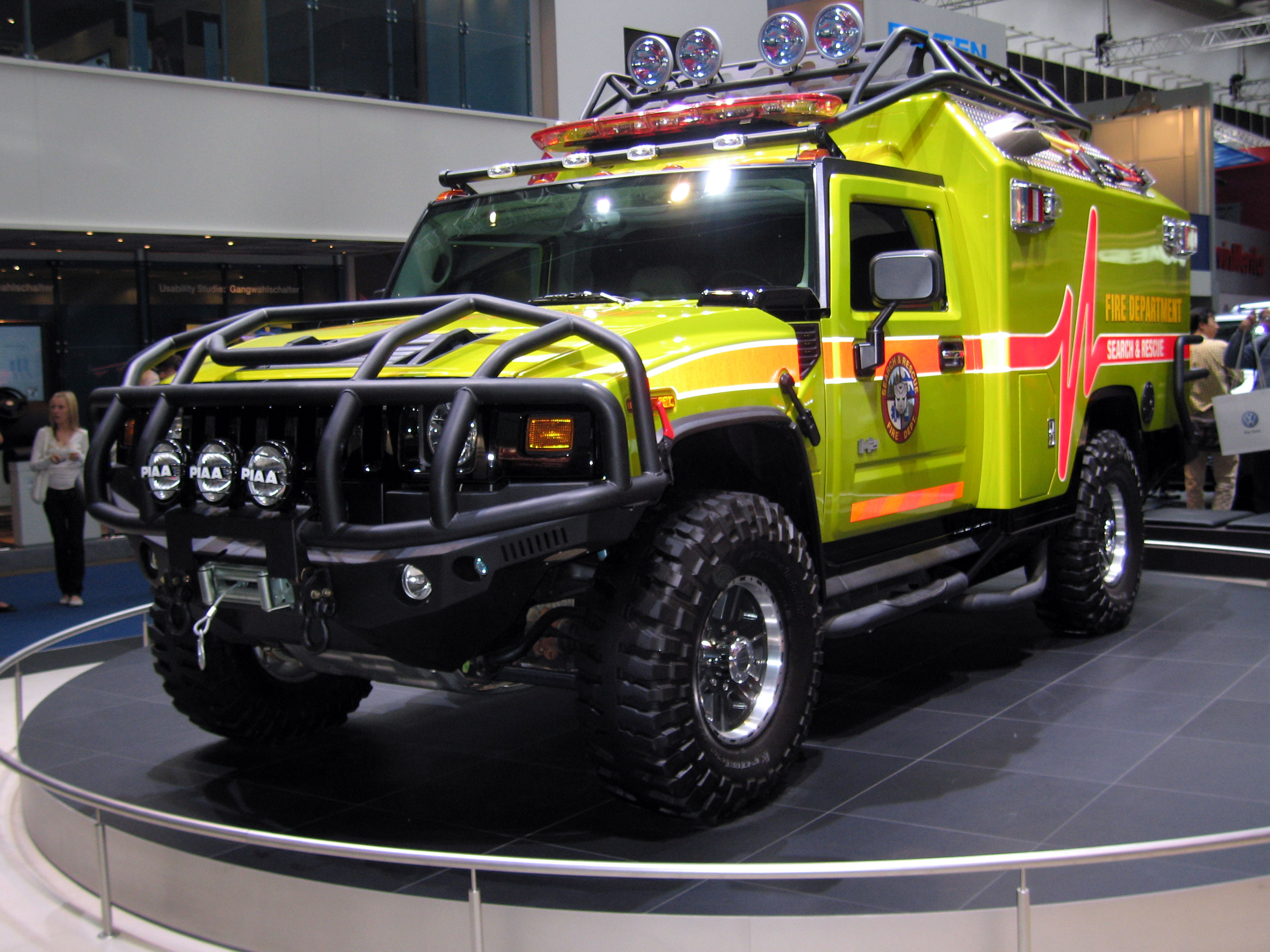
The Hummer H2 used to portray Ratchet

== Production ==
=== Development ===
In all the years of movie-making, I don't think the image of a truck transforming into a twenty-foot tall robot has ever been captured on screen. I also want to make a film that's a homage to 1980s movies and gets back to the sense of wonder that Hollywood has lost over the years. It will have those Spielberg-ian moments where you have the push-in on the wide-eyed kid and you feel like you're ten years old even if you're thirty-five.

— Tom DeSanto on why he produced the film

Don Murphy was initially planning a G.I. Joe film adaptation, but when the United States launched the invasion of Iraq in March 2003, Hasbro suggested adapting the Transformers franchise instead. Tom DeSanto joined Murphy because he was a fan of the series. They met with comic book writer Simon Furman, and cited the Generation 1 cartoon and comics as their main influence. They made the Creation Matrix their plot device, though Murphy had it renamed because of the film series The Matrix, but was later used again in the sequel. DeSanto chose to write the treatment from a human point of view to engage the audience, while Murphy wanted it to have a realistic tone, reminiscent of a disaster film. The treatment featured the Autobots Optimus Prime, Ironhide, Jazz, Prowl, Arcee, Ratchet, Wheeljack, and Bumblebee, and the Decepticons Megatron, Starscream, Soundwave, Ravage, Laserbeak, Rumble, Skywarp and Shockwave.

Steven Spielberg, a fan of the comics and toys, signed on as executive producer in 2004. John Rogers wrote the first draft, which pitted four Autobots against four Decepticons, and featured the Ark spaceship. Roberto Orci and Alex Kurtzman, fans of the cartoon, were hired to rewrite the script in February 2005. Spielberg suggested that "a boy and his car" should be the focus. This appealed to Orci and Kurtzman because it conveyed themes of adulthood and responsibility, "the things that a car represents in the United States". The characters of Sam Witwicky and Mikaela Banes were the sole point of view given in Orci and Kurtzman's first draft. The Transformers had no dialogue, as the producers feared talking robots would look ridiculous. The writers felt that even if it would look silly, not having the robots speak would betray the fanbase. The first draft also had a battle scene in the Grand Canyon. Spielberg read each of Orci and Kurtzman's drafts and gave notes for improvement. The writers remained involved throughout production, adding additional dialogue for the robots during the sound mixing (although none of this was kept in the final film, which ran fifteen minutes shorter than the initial edit). Furman's The Ultimate Guide, published by Dorling Kindersley, remained as a resource to the writers throughout production. Prime Directive was used as a fake working title. This was also the name of Dreamwave Productions' first Transformers comic book.

Michael Bay was asked to direct by Spielberg on July 30, 2005, but initially he dismissed the film as a "stupid toy movie". Bay admitted that he was skeptical when he was offered to direct. Nonetheless, he wanted to work with Spielberg, and gained new respect for the concept upon visiting Hasbro. Bay considered the first draft "too kiddie", so he increased the military's role in the story. The writers sought inspiration from G.I. Joe for the soldier characters, being careful not to mix the brands. Orci and Kurtzman were concerned the film could feel like a military recruitment commercial, so they chose to make the military believe nations like Iran were behind the Decepticon attack as well as making the Decepticons primarily military vehicles. Bay based Lennox's struggle to get to the Pentagon phoneline while struggling with an unhelpful operator on a real account he was given by a soldier when working on another film.

Orci and Kurtzman experimented with numerous robots from the franchise, ultimately selecting the characters most popular among the filmmakers to form the final cast. Bay acknowledged that most of the Decepticons were selected before their names or roles were developed, as Hasbro had to start designing the toys. Some of their names were changed because Bay was upset that they had been leaked. Optimus, Megatron, Bumblebee and Starscream were the only characters present in each version of the script. Arcee was a female Transformer introduced by Orci and Kurtzman, but she was cut because they found it difficult to explain robotic gender; Bay also disliked her motorcycle form, which he found too small. An early idea to have the Decepticons simultaneously strike multiple places around the world was also dropped.

Bay said the film cost $145 million and explained "My secret is, I shoot very, very fast." Bay compared his way of working to James Cameron as they both work quickly and serve as their own assistant director. Bay took a 30% reduction in his fee to keep the production in Los Angeles and work with his usual crew. Producers Lorenzo di Bonaventura and Ian Bryce, said the film cost only $150 million, and called it "a bargain" compared to the other tentpole films that summer, which cost as much as $300 million. According to Kim Masters of NPR, instead of boasting about how much they had spent, the studios did not want to admit to their real budget and risk further cost inflation on other projects, and her Hollywood source said that the budget of Transformers had passed $200 million.

=== Design ===
The filmmakers incorporated valid physics into their designs, establishing the necessity for a robot's size to correspond to that of its disguise. The layout of Optimus Prime's robotic body within his truck mode is seen here.

The filmmakers created the size of each robot with the size of their vehicle mode in mind, supporting the Transformer's rationale for their choice of disguise on Earth. The concept of traveling protoforms was developed by Roberto Orci when he wondered why "aliens who moonlight as vehicles need other vehicles to travel". This reflected a desire to move to a more alien look, away from the "blocky" Generation 1 Transformers. Another major influence in the designs was samurai armor, returning full-circle to the Japanese origins of the toy line. The robots also had to look alien, or else they would have resembled other cinematic robots made in the image of man.

A product placement deal with General Motors supplied alternate forms for most of the Autobots, which saved $3 million for the production. GM also provided nearly two hundred cars, most of which were flood damaged or non-salable, destined for destruction in the climactic battle scene. The U.S. Armed Forces provided significant support, enhancing the film's realism: the film features F-22s, F-117s, and V-22 Ospreys, the first time these aircraft were used for a film; soldiers served as extras, and authentic uniforms were provided for the actors. A-10 Thunderbolt IIs and Lockheed AC-130s also appear. Captain Christian Hodge joked that he had to explain to his superiors that the filmmakers wanted to portray most of their aircraft as evil Decepticons: however, he remarked "people love bad guys".

=== Filming ===
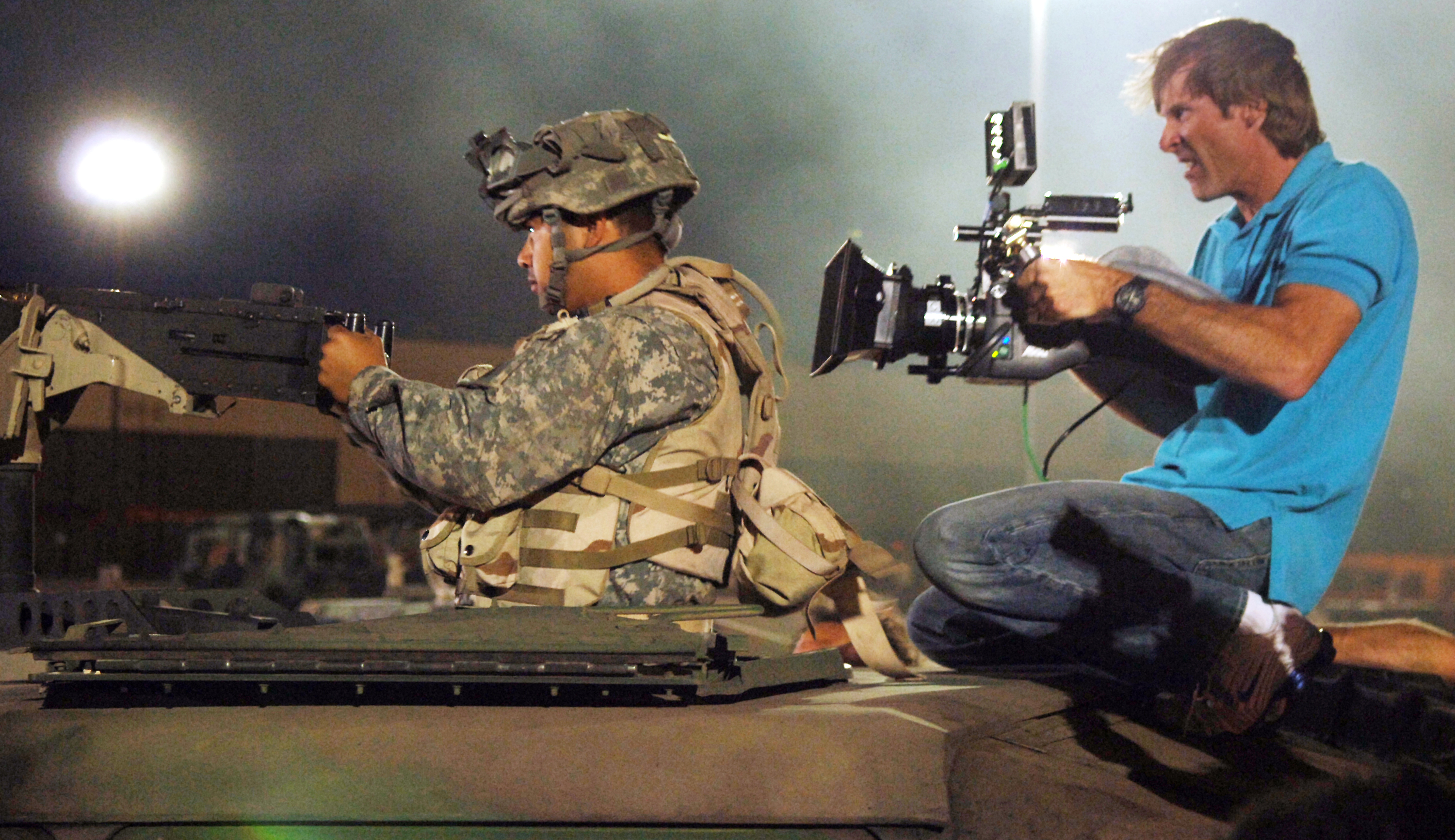
Director Michael Bay filming at Holloman Air Force Base

To save money on the production, Bay reduced his usual fee by 30%. He planned an 83-day shooting schedule, maintaining the required pace by doing more camera set-ups per day than usual. Bay chose to shoot the film in the United States instead of Australia or Canada, allowing him to work with a crew he was familiar with, and who understood his work ethic. A pre-shoot took place on April 19, 2006, and principal photography began three days later at Holloman Air Force Base, which stood in for Qatar. Due to their destruction later in the film by the Decepticon Blackout, the majority of the military structures shown on-screen were not property of Holloman Air Force Base, but were purchased ahead of filming from a private manufacturer of military shelter systems, AKS Military. To film the Scorponok sequence at White Sands Missile Range, a sweep was performed to remove unexploded ordnance before building of a village set could begin; ironically, the village would be blown up. The scene was broken down for the Air battle managers flying aboard the AWACS aircraft, who improvised dialogue as if it were an actual battle.

The company also shot at Hoover Dam and at The Pentagon, the first time since the September 11 attacks that film crews had been allowed at these locations. The external Hoover Dam scenes were shot before tourists arrived daily at 10:00 a.m., with shooting moving inside for the remainder of the day. Production in California was based at Hughes Aircraft at Playa Vista, where the hangar in which Megatron is imprisoned was built. Six weekends were spent in Los Angeles, California shooting the climactic battle, with some elements being shot on the Universal Studios backlot and at Detroit's Michigan Central Station. The crew was allowed to shoot at Griffith Observatory, which was still closed for renovations begun in 2002 and would reopen in November 2006. Filming wrapped on October 4, 2006.

The film has been found to re-use footage from Bay's previous film Pearl Harbor (2001).

=== Visual effects ===
Spielberg encouraged Bay to restrict CGI to the robots and background elements in the action sequences. Stunts such as Bonecrusher smashing through a bus were done practically, while cameras were placed into the midst of car crashes and explosions to make it look more exciting. Work on the animatics began in April 2005. Bay indicated that three quarters of the film's visual effects were made by Industrial Light & Magic (ILM), while Digital Domain made the rest, including the Arctic discovery of Megatron; Frenzy's severed head; a vending machine mutated by the Allspark, and the Autobots' protoforms. Many of the animators were big Transformers fans and were given free rein to experiment: a scene where Jazz attacks Brawl is a reference to a scene in The Transformers: The Movie where Kup jumps on Blitzwing.

I just didn't want to make the boxy characters. It's boring and it would look fake. By adding more doo-dads and stuff on the robots, more car parts, you can just make it more real.

— Michael Bay on the level of detail he wanted for the robots

ILM created computer-generated transformations during six months in 2005, looking at every inch of the car models. Initially the transformations were made to follow the laws of physics, but it did not look exciting enough and was changed to be more fluid. Bay rejected a liquid metal surface for the characters' faces, instead going for a "Rubik's Cube" style of modeling. He wanted numerous mechanical pieces visible so the robots would look more interesting, realistic, dynamic and quick, rather than like lumbering beasts. One such decision was to have the wheels stay on the ground for as long as possible, allowing the robots to cruise around as they changed. Bay instructed the animators to observe footage of two martial artists and numerous martial arts films to make the fights look graceful.

Due to the intricate designs of the Transformers, even the simplest motion of turning a wrist needs 17 visible parts; each of Ironhide's guns are made of ten thousand parts. Bumblebee uses a piece below his face-plate as an eyebrow, pieces in his cheeks swivel to resemble a smile, and all the characters' eyes are designed to dilate and brighten. According to Bay, "The visual effects were so complex it took a staggering 38 hours for ILM to render just one frame of movement"; that meant ILM had to increase their processing facilities. Each rendered piece had to look like real metal, shiny or dull. This was difficult to model because the aged and scarred robots had to transform from clean cars. Close-up shots of the robots were sped up to look "cool", but in wide shots the animation was slowed down to convincingly illustrate a sense of weight. Photographs were taken of each set. These were used as a reference for the lighting environment, which was reproduced within a computer, so the robots would look like they were convincingly moving there. Bay, who has directed numerous car commercials, understood ray tracing was the key to making the robots look real; the CGI models would look realistic based on how much of the environment was reflecting on their bodies. Numerous simulations were programmed into the robots, so the animators could focus on animating the particular areas needed for a convincing performance.

=== Music ===
Composer Steve Jablonsky, who collaborated with Bay on The Island, scored music for the trailers before work began on the film itself. Recording took place in April 2007, at the Sony Scoring Stage in Culver City, California. The score, including the teaser music, uses six major themes across ninety minutes of music. The Autobots have three themes, one named "Optimus" to represent the wisdom and compassion of the Autobot leader, and another played during their arrival on Earth. The Decepticons have a chanted theme which relies on electronics, unlike most of the score. The AllSpark also has its own theme. Hans Zimmer, Jablonsky's mentor, also helped to compose the score.

== Release ==
Transformers had its worldwide premiere at N Seoul Tower on June 10, 2007. It was the first time a Hollywood film had its opening event in South Korea. The film's June 27 premiere at the Los Angeles Film Festival used a live digital satellite feed to project the film on to a screen. A premiere took place at Rhode Island on June 28, which was a freely available event giving attendees the opportunity to buy tickets for $75 to benefit four charities: the Rhode Island Community Food Bank, the Autism Project of Rhode Island, Adoption Rhode Island, and Hasbro Children's Hospital. The film was released in IMAX on September 21, 2007, with extended footage that had not been included in the general theatrical release.

=== Marketing ===
Hasbro's toy line for the film was created over two months in late 2005 and early 2006, in heavy collaboration with the filmmakers. Protoform Optimus Prime and Starscream were released in the United States on May 1, 2007, and the first wave of figures was released on June 2. The line featured characters not in the film, including Arcee. A second wave, titled "AllSpark Power", was set for release late 2007, which consisted of repaints and robotic versions of ordinary vehicles in the film. The toys feature "Automorph Technology", where moving parts of the toy allow other parts to shift automatically. Merchandise for the film earned Hasbro $480 million in 2007.

Deals were made with 200 companies to promote the film in 70 countries. Michael Bay directed tie-in commercials for General Motors, Panasonic, Burger King and PepsiCo, while props – including the Camaro used for Bumblebee and the AllSpark – were put up for charity sale on eBay. A viral marketing alternate reality game was employed through the Sector 7 website, which presented the film and all previous Transformers toys and media as part of a cover-up operation called "Hungry Dragon", perpetrated by a "real life" Sector 7 to hide the existence of genuine Transformers. The site featured several videos presenting "evidence" of Transformers on Earth, including a cameo from the original Bumblebee.

=== Home media ===
Transformers was released on DVD and HD DVD on October 16, 2007, in North America. The Wal-Mart edition of the DVD included a shortened animated version of the prequel comic book, titled Transformers: Beginnings and featuring the voices of Ryan, Cullen, and Dunn, as well as Welker as Megatron. The Target copy was packaged with a transforming Optimus Prime DVD case and a prequel comic book about the Decepticons. The DVD sold 8.3 million copies in its first week, making it the fastest-selling DVD of 2007, in North America, and it sold 190,000 copies on HD DVD, which was the biggest debut on the format. The DVDs sold 13.74 million copies, making the film the most popular DVD title of 2007.

The film was released on Blu-ray on September 2, 2008. In the first week, the two-disc edition of the Blu-ray was number one in sales compared to other films on the format. The Blu-ray version accounted for two-thirds of the film's DVD sales that first week, selling the third most in overall DVD sales. On June 16, 2009, Paramount included a sticker on all new Transformers DVDs that contained a code to view exclusive content online from the first film and get a sneak peek at Transformers: Revenge of the Fallen. The content includes three exclusive clips from Revenge of the Fallen, behind-the-scenes footage from both films, and deleted scenes from the first film. Transformers was released on 4K UHD Blu-Ray on December 5, 2017.

The film grossed $304.9 million in home sales.

== Reception ==
=== Box office ===
Transformers had the highest per-screen and per-theater gross in 2007 in North America. It was released on July 3, 2007, with 8 p.m. preview screenings on July 2. The United States previews earned $8.8 million and in its first day of general release, it grossed $27.8 million, a record for Tuesday box-office gross until it was broken by The Amazing Spider-Man in 2012. It broke Spider-Man 2's record for the biggest Fourth of July gross, making $29 million. Transformers opened in over 4,050 theaters in North America and grossed $70.5 million in its first weekend, debuting at #1 and amounting to a $155.4 million opening week, giving it the record for the biggest opening week for a non-sequel, surpassing Spider-Man. It would also break other records during its first week, surpassing Planet of the Apes for having the highest non-sequel July opening weekend, War of the Worlds for scoring the highest non-sequel Fourth of July opening weekend, The Passion of the Christ for having the biggest non-sequel Wednesday gross and Independence Day for achieving the largest non-sequel Thursday gross. The opening's gross in the United States was 50% more than what Paramount Pictures had expected. One executive attributed it to word of mouth that explained to parents that "it [was] OK to take the kids". Transformers ended its theatrical run in the United States and Canada with a gross of $319.2 million, making it the third highest-grossing film of 2007 in these regions behind Spider-Man 3 and Shrek the Third. The film sold an estimated 46,402,100 tickets in North America.

The film was released in 10 international markets on June 28, 2007, including Australia, New Zealand, Singapore, and the Philippines. Transformers made $29.5 million in its first weekend, topping the box office in 10 countries. It grossed $5.2 million in Malaysia, becoming the most successful film in the country's history. Transformers opened in China on July 11 and became the second highest-grossing foreign film in the country (behind Titanic), making $37.3 million. Its opening there set a record for a foreign language film, making $3 million. The film was officially released in the United Kingdom on July 27, making £8.7 million, and helped contribute to the biggest attendance record ever for that weekend. It was second at the UK box office, behind The Simpsons Movie. In South Korea, Transformers recorded the largest audience for a foreign film in 2007 and the highest foreign revenue of the film.

Worldwide, Transformers was the highest-grossing non-sequel film in 2007 with $709.7 million, making it Bay's fourth highest-grossing film to date, with three of its sequels surpassing it. It was also the fifth highest-grossing film of 2007 worldwide, behind Pirates of the Caribbean: At World's End, Harry Potter and the Order of the Phoenix, Spider-Man 3 and Shrek the Third.

=== Critical response ===
On the review aggregator website Rotten Tomatoes, 57% of 227 critics' reviews are positive, with an average rating of 5.8/10. The website's consensus reads: "While believable characters are hard to come by in Transformers, the effects are staggering and the action is exhilarating." On Metacritic, the film has a weighted average score of 61 out of 100, based on 35 critics, indicating "generally favorable" reviews.

IGN's Todd Gilchrist called it Bay's best film, and "one of the few instances where it's OK to enjoy something for being smart and dumb at the same time, mostly because it's undeniably also a whole lot of fun". The Advertiser's Sean Fewster found the visual effects so seamless that "you may come to believe the studio somehow engineered artificial intelligence". The Denver Post's Lisa Kennedy praised the depiction of the robots as having "a believably rendered scale and intimacy", and ABC presenter Margaret Pomeranz was surprised "that a complete newcomer to the Transformers phenomenon like myself became involved in the fate of these mega-machines". Ain't It Cool News's Drew McWeeny felt most of the cast grounded the story, and that "it has a real sense of wonder, one of the things that's missing from so much of the big CGI light shows released these days". Author Peter David found it ludicrous fun, and said that "[Bay] manages to hold on to his audience's suspension of disbelief long enough for us to segue into some truly spectacular battle scenes". Roger Ebert gave the film a positive review, giving it 3 stars out of a possible 4, writing: "It's goofy fun with a lot of stuff that blows up real good, and it has the grace not only to realize how preposterous it is, but to make that into an asset."

Response to the human storylines was mixed. The Hollywood Reporter's Kirk Honeycutt liked "how a teen plotline gets tied in to the end of the world", while Empire's Ian Nathan praised Shia LaBeouf as "a smart, natural comedian, [who] levels the bluntness of this toy story with an ironic bluster". Ain't It Cool News founder Harry Knowles felt Bay's style conflicted with Spielberg's, arguing the military story only served as a distraction from Sam. James Berardinelli hated the film as he did not connect with the characters in-between the action, which he found tedious. Los Angeles Times' Kenneth Turan found the humans "oddly lifeless, doing little besides marking time until those big toys fill the screen", while ComingSoon.net's Joshua Starnes felt the Transformers were "completely believable, right up to the moment they open their mouths to talk, when they revert to bad cartoon characters". Daily Herald's Matt Arado was annoyed that "the Transformers [are] little more than supporting players", and felt the middle act was sluggish. CNN's Tom Charity questioned the idea of a film based on a toy, and felt it would "buzz its youthful demographic [...] but leave the rest of us wondering if Hollywood could possibly aim lower".

=== General ===
Transformers fans were initially divided over the film due to the radical redesigns of many characters, although the casting of Peter Cullen was warmly received. USA Today summarized the views of critics and audiences saying "there is general raving about the mechanical heroes and general grumbling about the excessive screen time given to some of the human characters played by Shia LaBeouf, Anthony Anderson, Tyrese Gibson and Jon Voight. Optimus Prime, the leader of the good-guy Autobots, doesn't appear until midway through the film." Transformers comic book writer Simon Furman and Beast Wars script consultant Benson Yee both considered the film to be spectacular fun, although Furman also argued that there were too many human storylines. Yee felt that being the first in a series, the film had to establish much of the fictional universe and therefore did not have time to focus on the Decepticons. Audiences polled by CinemaScore gave the film an average grade of "A" on an A+ to F scale. With audiences under 18 the score rises to "A+", and the film was most popular with children and parents, including older women, and attracted many African American and Latino viewers.

The film created a greater awareness of the franchise and drew in many new fans. Transformers' box office success led to the active development of films based on Voltron and Robotech, as well as a Knight Rider reboot. When filming the sequel, Bay was told by soldiers the film helped their children understand what their work was like, and that many had christened their Buffalos – the vehicle used for Bonecrusher – after various Transformer characters.

After the film's 2009 sequel was titled Revenge of the Fallen, screenwriter Orci was asked if this film would be retitled, just as Star Wars was titled Star Wars Episode IV: A New Hope when re-released. He doubted the possibility, but said if it was retitled, he would call it Transformers: More Than Meets the Eye.

=== Accolades ===
Award	Category	Recipient	Result
80th Academy Awards
80th Academy Awards	Best Sound Editing	Ethan Van der Ryn and Mike Hopkins	Nominated
80th Academy Awards	Best Sound Mixing	Kevin O'Connell, Greg P. Russell and Peter J. Devlin	Nominated
80th Academy Awards	Best Visual Effects	Scott Benza, Russell Earl, Scott Farrar and John Frazier	Nominated
2007 MTV Movie Awards	Best Summer Movie You Haven't Seen Yet		Won
2008 MTV Movie Awards	Best Movie		Won
2008 Kids' Choice Awards	Favorite Movie		Nominated
2007 Kuala Lumpur International Film Festival	Best Special Effects (Jury Merit Award)		Won
Hollywood Film Festival	Visual Effects Supervisor of the Year	Scott Farrar	Won
6th Visual Effects Society Awards	Outstanding Visual Effects in a Visual Effects-Driven Feature Motion Picture	Scott Farrar, Shari Hanson, Russell Earl, Scott Benza	Won
6th Visual Effects Society Awards	Best Single Visual Effect of the Year	Desert Highway Sequence – Scott Farrar, Shari Hanson, Shawn Kelly, Michael Jamieson	Won
6th Visual Effects Society Awards	Outstanding Performance by an Animated; Character in a Live Action Motion Picture	Optimus Prime – Rick O'Connor, Doug Sutton, Keiji Yamaguchi, Jeff White	Nominated
6th Visual Effects Society Awards	Outstanding Models and Miniatures in a Feature Motion Picture	Dave Fogler, Ron Woodall, Alex Jaeger, Brain Gernand	Won
BMI Awards	BMI Film Music Award	Steve Jablonsky	Won
28th Golden Raspberry Awards	Worst Supporting Actor	Jon Voight (also for Bratz: The Movie, September Dawn and National Treasure: Book of Secrets)	Nominated
34th Saturn Awards	Best Science Fiction Film	Transformers	Nominated
34th Saturn Awards	Best Special Effects	Scott Benza, Russell Earl, Scott Farrar and John Frazier	Won

Entertainment Weekly named Bumblebee as their seventh favorite computer generated character, while The Times listed Optimus Prime's depiction as the thirtieth best film robot, citing his coolness and dangerousness.

== Franchise ==
The second film, Revenge of the Fallen was released June 24, 2009. The third film, Dark of the Moon was released June 29, 2011. The fourth film, Age of Extinction was released June 27, 2014, and the fifth film titled The Last Knight was released on June 21, 2017. Revenge of the Fallen, Dark of the Moon and Age of Extinction were financial successes, while The Last Knight failed at the box office. The sequels have received mostly mixed to negative reviews. The sixth film Bumblebee was released on December 21, 2018, to positive reviews. It is the highest-rated film in the Transformers series. The seventh film Rise of the Beasts was released on June 9, 2023, to mixed reviews. Another film, written by Jason Fuchs, is in development.
