= Megan Fox =

American actress (born 1986)

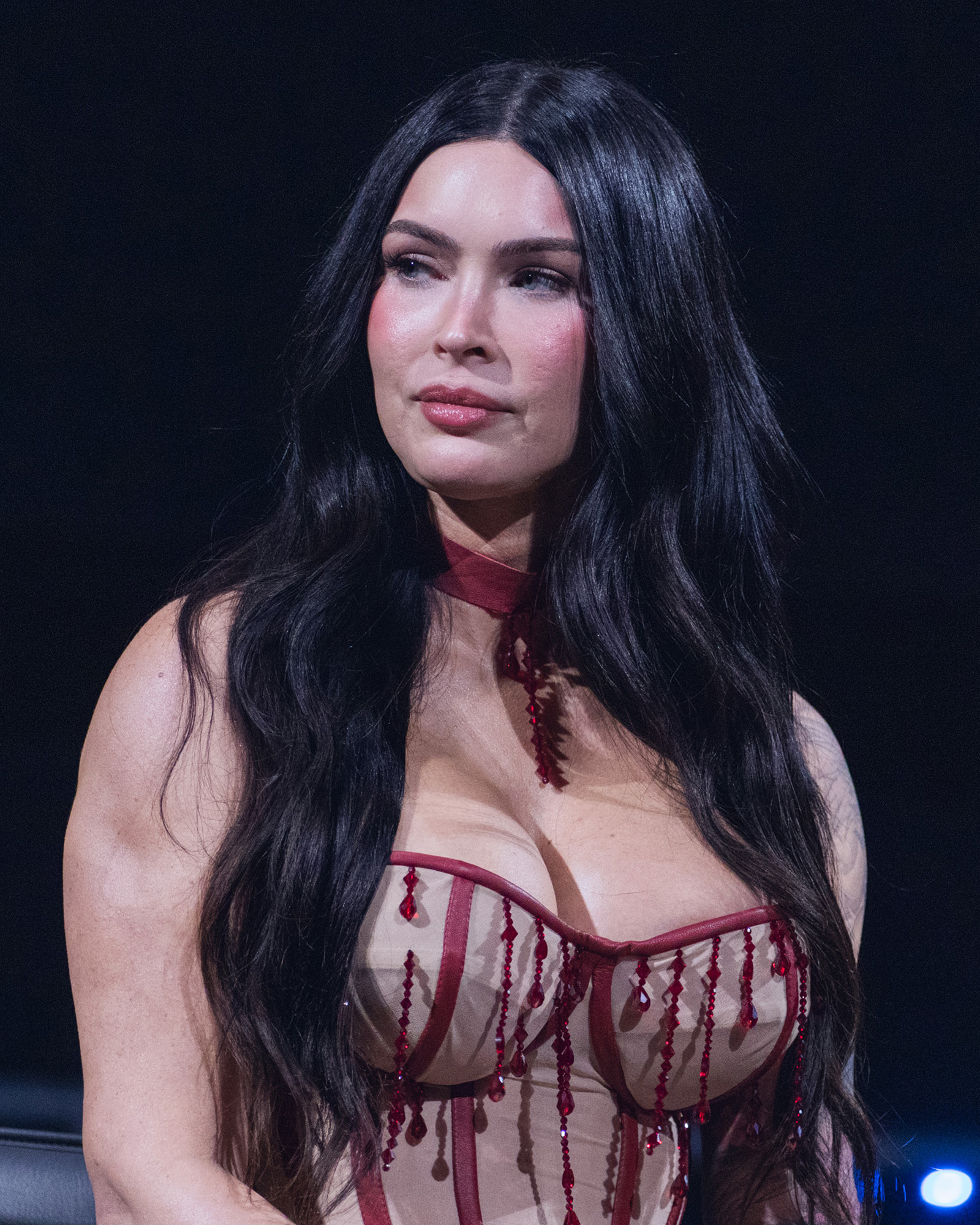
- Fox in 2025
- Born: Megan Denise Fox; May 16, 1986 (age 40); Oak Ridge, Tennessee, U.S.
- Occupation: Actress
- Years active: 2001–present
- Spouse: Brian Austin Green (m. 2010; div. 2021)
- Partner: Colson Baker (2020–2024)
- Children: 4
- Awards: Full list

Megan Denise Fox (born May 16, 1986) is an American actress. She made her acting debut in the family film Holiday in the Sun (2001), which was followed by numerous supporting roles in film and television, such as the teen musical comedy Confessions of a Teenage Drama Queen (2004), as well as a starring role in the ABC sitcom Hope & Faith (2004–2006). Her breakout role was as Mikaela Banes in the blockbuster action film Transformers (2007), which she reprised in its sequel Transformers: Revenge of the Fallen (2009).

Fox also portrayed the titular character in the horror comedy Jennifer's Body (2009), starred as April O'Neil in the superhero action film Teenage Mutant Ninja Turtles (2014) and its sequel Teenage Mutant Ninja Turtles: Out of the Shadows (2016), and appeared in the fifth and sixth seasons of the Fox sitcom New Girl (2016–2017).

Described as a sex symbol, Fox has made appearances in numerous magazines such as Maxim, Rolling Stone, and FHM. She has received two Scream Awards and four Teen Choice Awards.

== Early life ==
Megan Denise Fox was born on May 16, 1986, in Oak Ridge, Tennessee, to parents Gloria Darlene (née Cisson) and Franklin Thomas Fox. She spent her early childhood in nearby Rockwood. Her parents divorced when she was three years old, and she and her sister were raised by their mother and stepfather, Tony Tonachio. Fox was raised in a strict Pentecostal household and later attended Catholic school for 12 years. She said that her parents were "very strict" and that she was not allowed to have a boyfriend or invite friends to her house. Fox described her stepfather as being "verbally, mentally, and emotionally abusive" until his death. She later revealed that she developed an eating disorder during adolescence and struggled with manic depression, the latter of which "[ran] in my family, so there was definitely some wrestling with chemical imbalance going on." Fox lived with her mother until she was able to support herself financially.

Fox began training in dance and drama at age five in Kingston, Tennessee. At age 10, after moving to St. Petersburg, Florida, she continued her training. She began modeling at age 13 after winning several awards at the 1999 American Modeling and Talent Convention in Hilton Head, South Carolina. Fox attended Morningside Academy in Port St. Lucie before transferring to St. Lucie West Centennial High School. At age 17, she tested out of school via correspondence to move to Los Angeles, California.

Fox has said that she was bullied in middle school and ate lunch in the bathroom to avoid harassment. She also said that she was unpopular in high school, generally got along better with boys than girls, disliked school, and was not a strong believer in formal education.

== Career ==
=== 2000s: Early roles and breakthrough ===
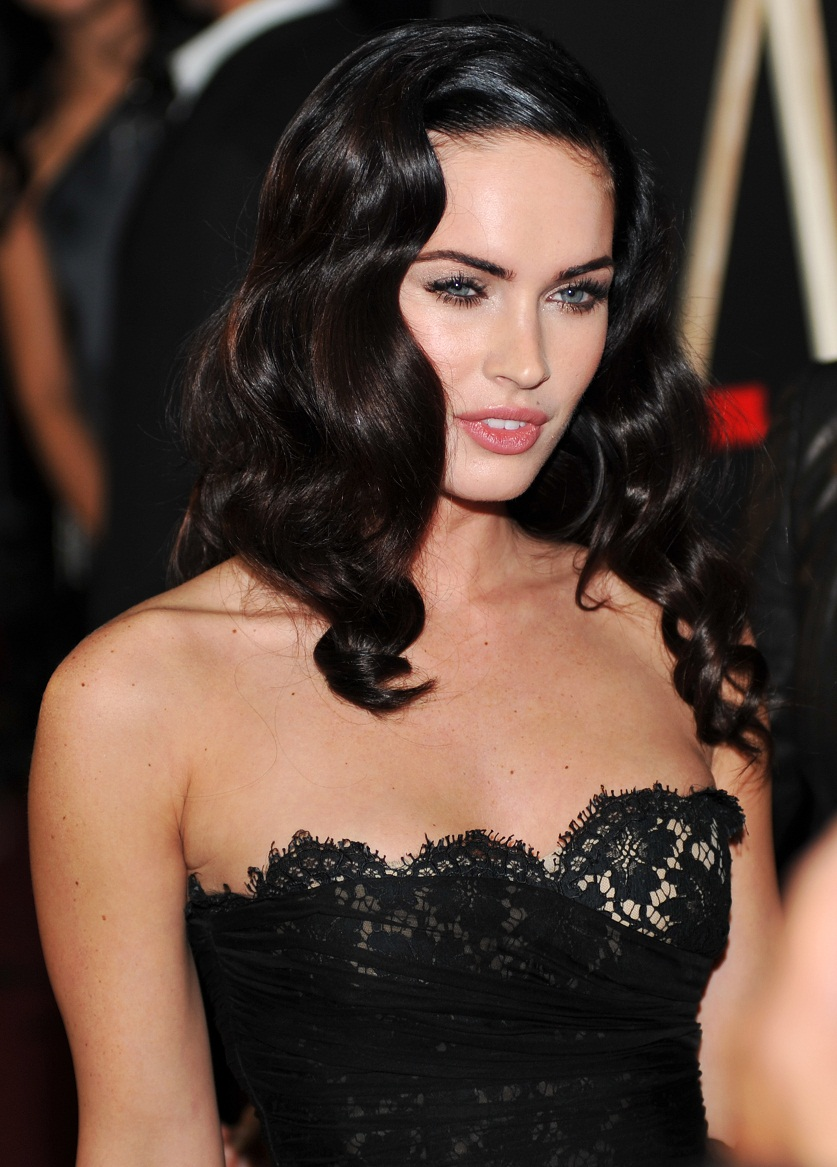
Fox at the 2009 Toronto International Film Festival screening of Jennifer's Body on September 10, 2009

In 2001, Fox made her acting debut in the romantic comedy Holiday in the Sun, as spoiled heiress Brianna Wallace and rival of Alex Stewart (Ashley Olsen), which was released direct-to-DVD on November 20, 2001. In the next several years, she guest-starred on the sitcoms What I Like About You and Two and a Half Men. Fox also appeared as an uncredited extra in the action film Bad Boys II (2003).

In 2004, Fox made her feature film debut opposite Lindsay Lohan in the musical comedy Confessions of a Teenage Drama Queen, playing the supporting role of Carla Santini, a rival of Lola (Lohan). She was also cast in a regular role on the ABC sitcom Hope & Faith, in which she portrayed Sydney Shanowski, replacing Nicole Paggi. Fox appeared in the second and third seasons, until the series was canceled by ABC in May 2006.

In 2007, Fox won the lead female role of Mikaela Banes in the 2007 live-action film Transformers, based on the toy and cartoon saga of the same name. Fox played the love interest of Shia LaBeouf's character Sam Witwicky. Fox was nominated for an MTV Movie Award in the category of "Breakthrough Performance", and was also nominated for three Teen Choice Awards. She had signed on for two more Transformers sequels, reprising her role as Mikaela in Transformers: Revenge of the Fallen. There was controversy surrounding Fox's appearance while filming the sequel when Michael Bay, the film's director, ordered the actress to gain ten pounds. The film was released worldwide on June 24, 2009, to box office success.

Fox was to star in the third installment, Transformers: Dark of the Moon, but was not included because of her statements comparing working under director Bay to working for Hitler. She confessed on GQ Magazine that she had lost approximately 30 pounds during filming due to consuming a primary diet of water and vinegar, and reportedly had a dispute over her visible loss of weight with the director on set. Bay stated in June 2009 that Fox was fired on orders of executive producer Steven Spielberg, a claim Spielberg denied.

In 2009, Fox had her first lead role since the Transformers series; she portrayed the title character in Jennifer's Body, written by Academy Award–winning screenwriter Diablo Cody. The film initially earned mixed to average reviews upon its release, with Fox's performance earning praise. However, the film grew a cult following over time and was critically reassessed as a "forgotten feminist classic". According to Cody, the film was marketed incorrectly by executives who focused their efforts on the young male audience.

In April 2009, she began filming the western superhero film Jonah Hex, in which she portrayed Tallulah Black / Leila, a gun-wielding beauty and Jonah Hex's (Josh Brolin) love interest. The film was released on June 18, 2010. Despite receiving top billing, Fox described her role in the film as being a cameo. Jonah Hex was a critical and commercial failure in the US, with its international distribution canceled after its poor performance. The film was named the "worst picture of the year" by the Houston Film Critics Society.

=== 2010s: Rise to prominence ===
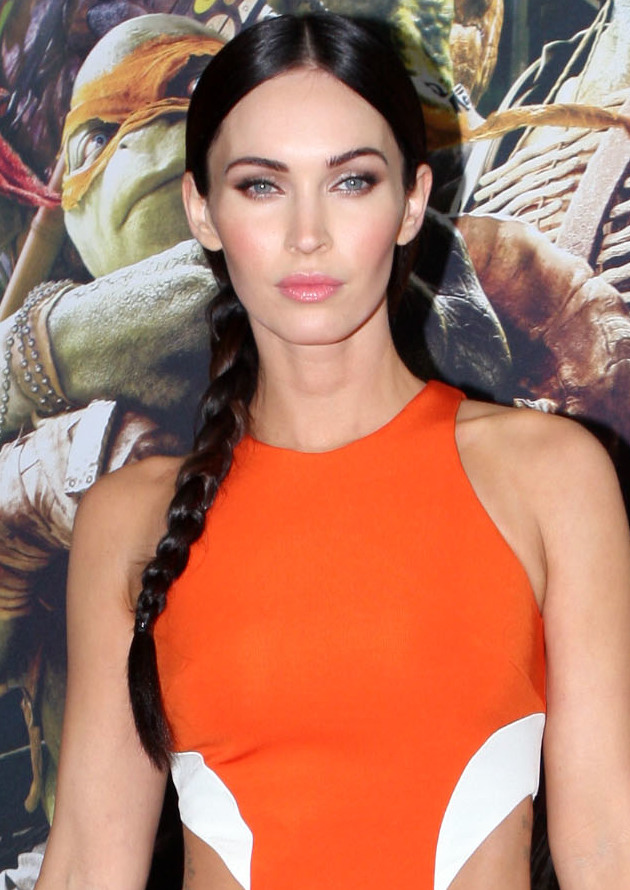
Fox at a Teenage Mutant Ninja Turtles screening in Sydney on September 7, 2014

Fox starred alongside Mickey Rourke in the drama Passion Play. After premiering at the Toronto International Film Festival, its conventional theatrical distribution was bypassed for a direct-to-video release, with only two screens briefly showing the film to fulfill contractual obligations. Rourke remarked that the film was "terrible. Another terrible movie." Fox appeared with Dominic Monaghan in the music video for Eminem and Rihanna's single "Love the Way You Lie". In 2012, Fox appeared briefly in Sacha Baron Cohen's comedy film The Dictator and had a featured role in Judd Apatow's comedy film This Is 40. She voiced the role of Lois Lane in the animated comedy film Robot Chicken DC Comics Special, an episode of the television comedy series Robot Chicken that aired as a one-off special during Cartoon Network's Adult Swim programming block on September 9, 2012.

In January 2013, Fox was featured in a Brazilian television commercial for Brahma beer. In February 2013, Fox set aside her differences with her former director Michael Bay and worked again with him on his reboot of Teenage Mutant Ninja Turtles (2014), starring as the lead human character of April O'Neil.

In 2015, Fox was cast in the role of Amelia Delthanis in the Plarium video game, Stormfall: Rise of Balur. In October 2015, it was confirmed that Fox would be temporarily replacing Zooey Deschanel in the television sitcom New Girl, following Deschanel's maternity leave. She starred as Reagan Lucas, appearing in the fifth and sixth seasons of the series. Her performance earned positive reviews from critics. In 2016, Fox reprised her role as April O'Neil in the sequel Teenage Mutant Ninja Turtles: Out of the Shadows.

On September 12, 2018, it was confirmed that Fox would star in the Korean War film The Battle of Jangsari, beside Korean actor Kim Myung-min. She played a lead role as Marguerite Higgins, an American news reporter.

In 2019, Fox starred in the mystery-fantasy film Above the Shadows opposite Olivia Thirlby and Alan Ritchson, directed by Claudia Myers. It was released on July 19, 2019, by Gravitas Ventures. That same year, Fox appeared in Zeroville directed by James Franco, which had been shot in 2014. The film was panned by critics and performed poorly at the box office.

=== 2020s work ===
In 2020, Fox starred opposite Josh Duhamel in the family comedy film Think Like a Dog, which was released on video on demand on June 9, 2020. Also that year, she starred in the lead role of the action film Rogue, which was released on August 28, 2020.

In 2021 she starred in two thrillers: Midnight in the Switchgrass opposite Emile Hirsch and Bruce Willis, directed by Randall Emmett; and Till Death, directed by S.K. Dale.

In 2022 Fox starred in the drama comedy Big Gold Brick, alongside Oscar Isaac, Andy García, Lucy Hale, and Emory Cohen, directed by Brian Petsos. Fox also played a role in the film Taurus, a musical drama, alongside Machine Gun Kelly, Naomi Wild, and Lil Tjay.

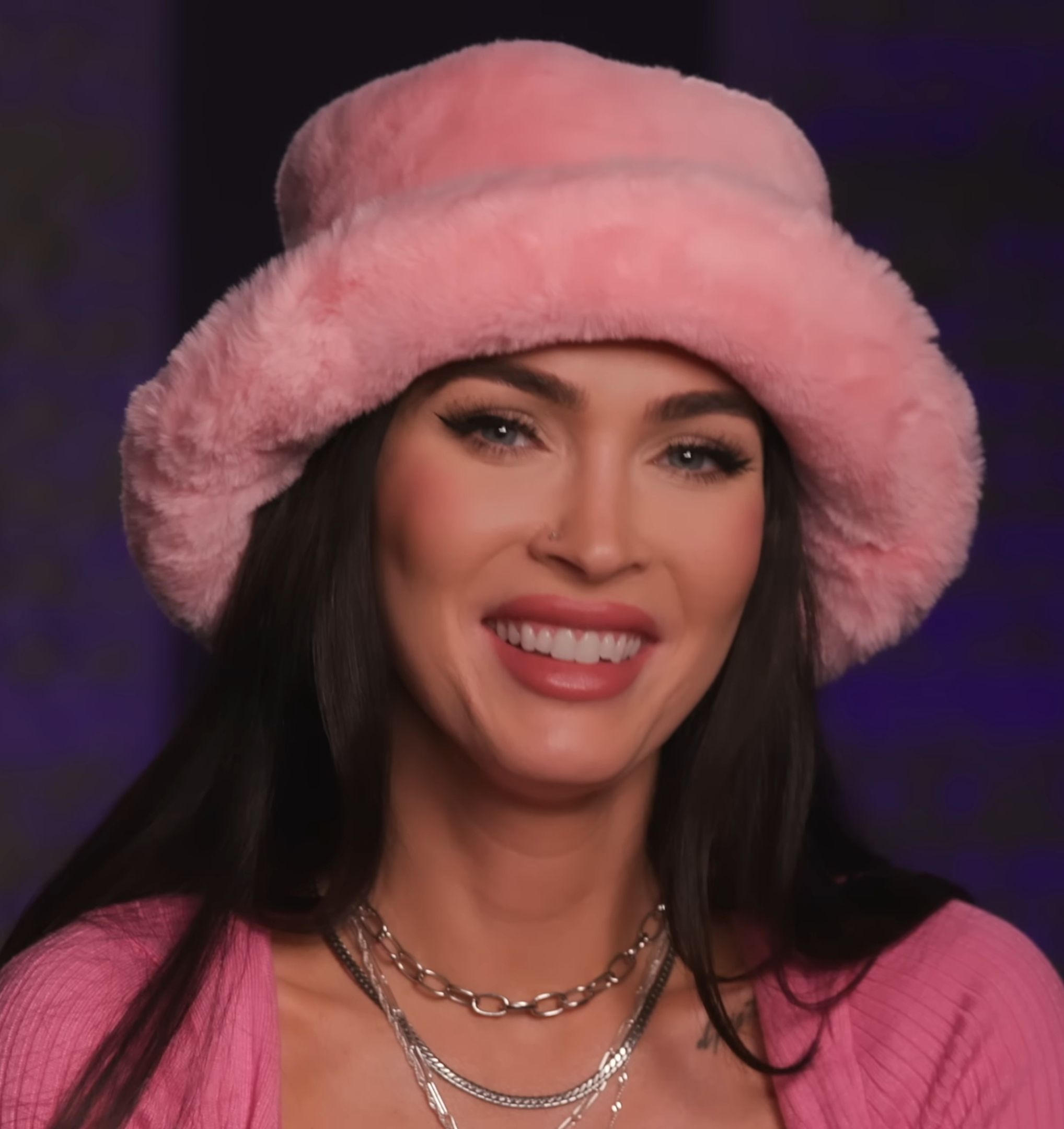
Fox in 2023

In 2023, Fox was featured on the cover of the Sports Illustrated Swimsuit Issue. Fox played crime boss Alana in the 2023 thriller film Johnny & Clyde with Tyson Ritter. Fox played Gina in the fourth Expendables film, Expend4bles, and voiced Nitara in the video game Mortal Kombat 1, both released in September of the same year.

In November 2023, Fox released her first book, titled Pretty Boys Are Poisonous, a collection of her own poetry. Fox starred as Alice, a lifelike artificially intelligent android, in Subservience, which was released in September 2024. In December 2025, Fox voiced Toy Chica in the film Five Nights at Freddy's 2.

== Public image ==
=== Status and persona ===
Chris Lee of the Los Angeles Times called Fox a "sex symbol of the highest order" and said she was "the first bona fide sex symbol of the 21st century." Craig Flaster of MTV stated, "Transformers broke Fox into the mainstream, immediately turning her into a household name and international sex symbol." She has been featured on various magazine covers and "hottest" and "most beautiful woman" lists throughout the years, such as Maxim's Hot 100 lists and when FHM readers voted her the "Sexiest Woman in the World" in 2008. People named her one of 2012's and 2017's Most Beautiful at Every Age. Scholar Marc DiPaolo stated that Fox achieved instant fame as Mikaela in Transformers because a "highly sexualized, erotically idealized figure draped over a car or motorcycle invariably evokes lust in the heterosexual male onlooker" and Fox did this by leaning over a Camaro while wearing "a flimsy pink belly shirt" and short skirt, which read as "an unequivocal sex invite" to male viewers. The editors of Men's Health also credited the Camaro scene with contributing to Fox's fame.

Fox with two of her tattoos visible

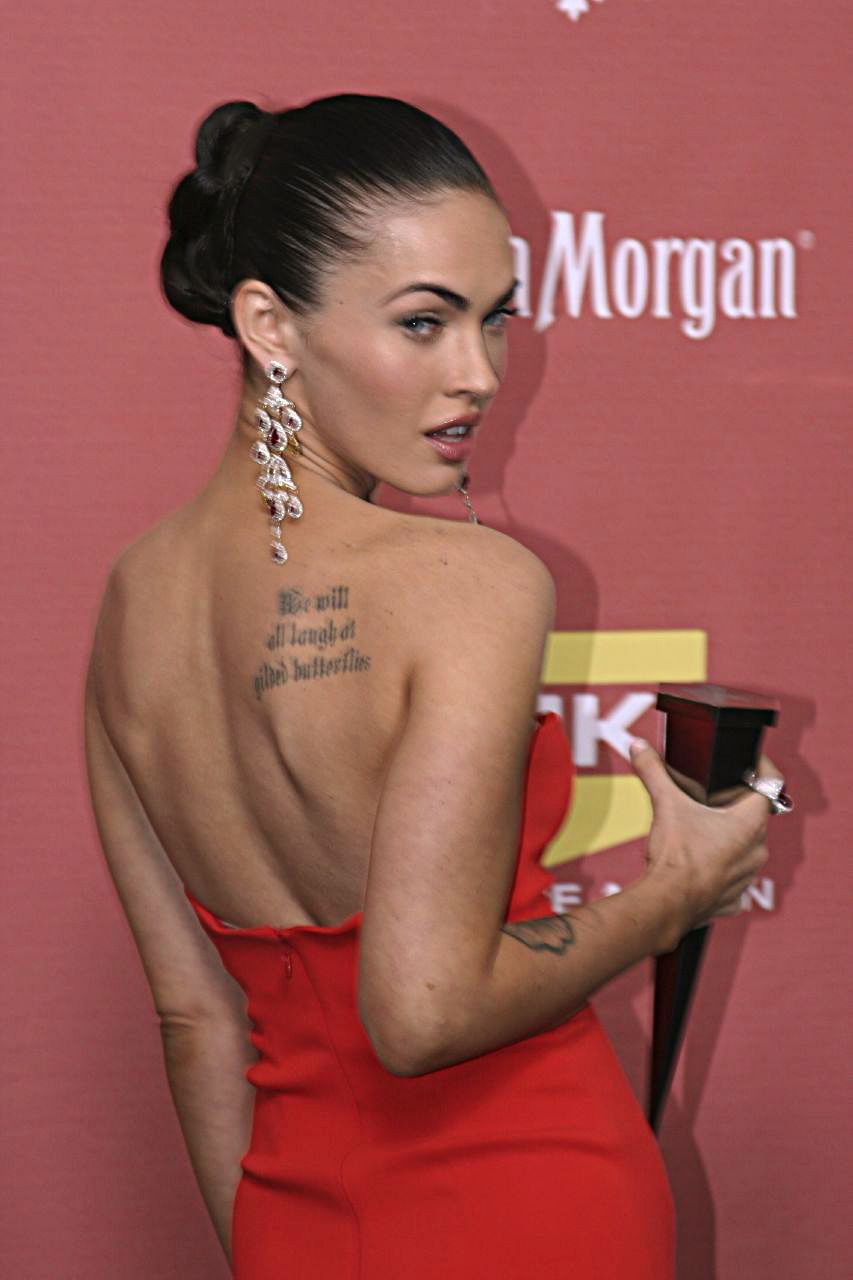
Fox at Spike TV's 2007 Scream Awards on October 19, 2007

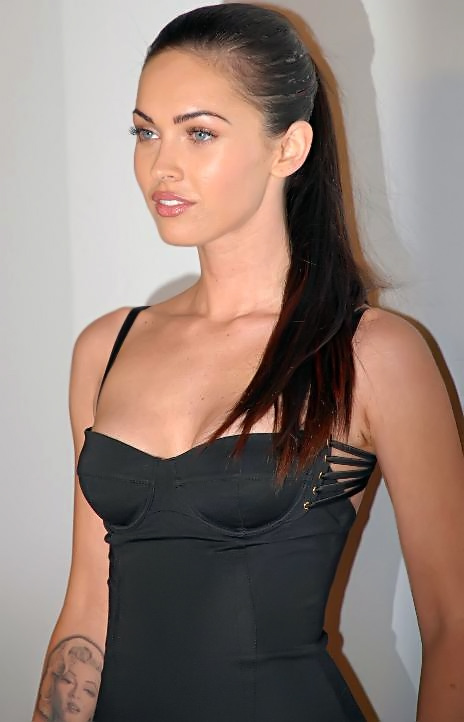
Fox at the 7th Annual Hollywood Life Magazine Breakthrough Awards on December 9, 2007

Fox said all women in Hollywood are known and marketed as sex symbols, but this is okay if the woman knows how to use the status. She created a character for her public image because she was unwilling to sacrifice her true self to the world. Scholars Wheeler Winston Dixon and Gwendolyn Audrey Foster disagreed that every woman in Hollywood is marketed as a sex symbol, and stated that Fox's "celebrity is based on what she admits is an entirely artificial construct designed for dissemination in the Internet age, a 21st-century media personality in every sense of the word." Part of her persona included making outlandish comments, which she said helped her reach her level of fame versus being "a typical starlet" who "said all the right things". Her tattoos, which she began getting at age 19 as a form of self-expression, helped popularize tattoo fashion. She had over nine known tattoos, including a picture of Marilyn Monroe's face on her right forearm and a quote on her shoulder. Author John Tehranian argued that Fox's Monroe tattoo enhanced her "implicit claims to Monroe's legacy as Hollywood's leading sex symbol." Fox ended up removing the Monroe tattoo in a series of laser surgeries because she felt that Monroe's life was full of negativity and she did not want to emulate it.

The press often compared Fox to actress Angelina Jolie, dubbing her the "next Angelina Jolie", which also affected her image. Amid this and reports that she was to replace Jolie in a new Lara Croft film, Fox commented that the comparisons indicate a lack of creativity on the part of the press and attributed them to both her and Jolie being brunette, having tattoos, cursing, and mentioning and joking about sex, "which people find outrageous". Lynn Hirschberg of The New York Times opined that "the Jolie comparison would probably have been made by the media eventually, but Fox sped up the process" by "linking herself to Jolie" and that she "enjoyed creating entertaining copy" by telling "tales of darkness and lust."

In 2009, Fox's public image came under scrutiny when an unsigned letter from three crew members of Transformers defended director Michael Bay against accusations made by Fox about his on-set behavior, including a comparison with Adolf Hitler. In response to the letter alleging that Fox's on-set behavior is unpleasant and differs from her public persona, Bay stated he does not condone the letter or Fox's "outlandish quotes", but that "her crazy quips are part of her crazy charm" and that they still work well together. A production assistant who worked on Transformers also stated that he never saw Fox act inappropriately on set. Fox said the letter's claims were false and that she had spoken privately with the parties involved. She said she was "very fortunate" to be a part of the franchise and was looking forward to continuing her work. DiPaolo concluded that Fox's criticism of the press's sexually objectifying girls and women was in stark contrast to her sex symbol status and that "her defiance of director Michael Bay and frequent outspoken comments" stifled her career.

=== Media exposure ===
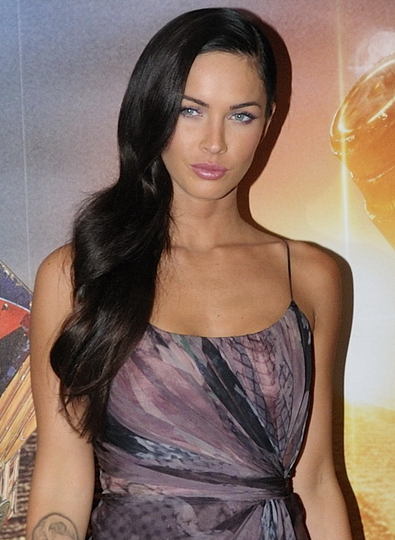
Fox at the premiere of Transformers: Revenge of the Fallen in Paris on June 12, 2009

The increased media exposure was difficult for Fox, who acknowledged being shy and insecure, to adjust to. It also positioned her as a potential role model and later led to her being typecast. She rejected being a formal role model, but said that she could make young girls feel "strong and intelligent and be outspoken and fight for what they think is right" and that she was a different role model for girls that maybe America was not comfortable with. She considered being typecast as attractive an opportunity to surprise people when she gives a good performance in a film, but said she is interested in portraying less sexualized characters. MTV's Craig Flaster said that although Fox has "been typecast as the big-budget sex symbol", she has shown comedic range.

Fox's overexposure in the media led several men's websites, such as AskMen, to boycott her on August 4, 2009, although some refused to do so, feeling that the boycott was a publicity stunt and therefore hypocritical. In response to the media attention, Fox told magazine Nylon, in September of that year, that "[the studio] wanted to make sure [the film] would make $700 million, so they oversaturated the media with their stars" and that she did not "want to have people get completely sick of [her] before [she's] ever even done something legitimate." She became much less prominent in the media by 2010, after starring in the less commercially successful films Jonah Hex and Passion Play. That same year, Fox said, "My biggest regret is that I've assisted the media in making me into a cartoon character. I don't regret what has happened to me, but I regret the way I have dealt with it." Dixon and Foster stated, "The problem [Fox] faces is that the [image] construct has replaced the real in the minds of the public; and once established, a media persona is hard to recalibrate."

== Personal life ==
In 2009, Fox was targeted by a group of fashion-motivated criminals known as the "Bling Ring", who robbed her then-boyfriend Brian Austin Green's home for access to Fox's possessions. In 2013, she said that her Christian faith is still very important to her and she believes it keeps her grounded.

Fox and then-husband Green were supporters of Generosity Water, and funded the creation of over ten water wells for the organization.

Regarding relationships and her sexuality, Fox said that she has a general distrust and dislike of men and that the perception of her as a "wild and crazy sexpot" is false because she is asocial; Fox stated that she would rather stay at home instead of going out, and emphasized that she cannot have sex with someone she does not love. She is bisexual, and said she believes that "all humans are born with the ability to be attracted to both sexes". She stated in 2009, "I have no question in my mind about being bisexual. But I'm also a hypocrite: I would never date a girl who was bisexual, because that means they also sleep with men, and men are so dirty that I'd never want to sleep with a girl who had slept with a man."

Fox told InStyle in July 2021: "A girl would come up to me and be like: 'You had a lot to do with me, like identifying and understanding that I was gay or understanding that I was bisexual...' And that, of course, is by far, like, the most moving, rewarding thing that I have experienced in my life! To be a part of something that helped people figure that out, or helped people deal with that, or feel better about that. One of my favorite things that I get called, is being like, a bi icon and that is one of the things I am the most proud of!"

She has several tattoos, including the Chinese symbol for "strength" drawn on the back of her neck, a quote from the William Shakespeare play King Lear that reads "We will all laugh at gilded butterflies", the yin and yang symbol on her left wrist, and a crescent moon entwined with a star on her ankle. Fox also has a poem tattooed near her breast that reads "There once was a little girl, who never knew love until a boy broke her heart" and another on her back that quotes Friedrich Nietzsche: "And those who were seen dancing were thought to be insane by those who could not hear the music." She claimed that she had it drawn in honor of her Passion Play costar Mickey Rourke but later clarified that it is "not necessarily a homage to him." She also once had her ex-husband Brian Austin Green's first name tattooed on her hip, but later had it covered. She removed the portrait of Marilyn Monroe that was tattooed on her right forearm, stating "It is a negative character, as she suffered from personality disorders and was bipolar. I do not want to attract this kind of negative energy in my life." She also has a tattoo on her left collarbone that reads "the gunman" in Spanish, as well as numerous flowers and one snake on her abdomen. Fox has numerous smaller tattoos splayed across her fingers, some of which include dots, numbers, and a crescent moon.

=== Health ===
Fox has a form of brachydactyly called brachydactyly type D, and has discussed her obsessive–compulsive disorder (OCD), insecurities, and self-harming, and has acknowledged that she has low self-esteem.

In her book Pretty Boys Are Poisonous, Fox revealed that she miscarried her pregnancy with what would have been her fourth child and her first with Machine Gun Kelly. She also shared that she had experienced an ectopic pregnancy in the past.

=== Relationships ===
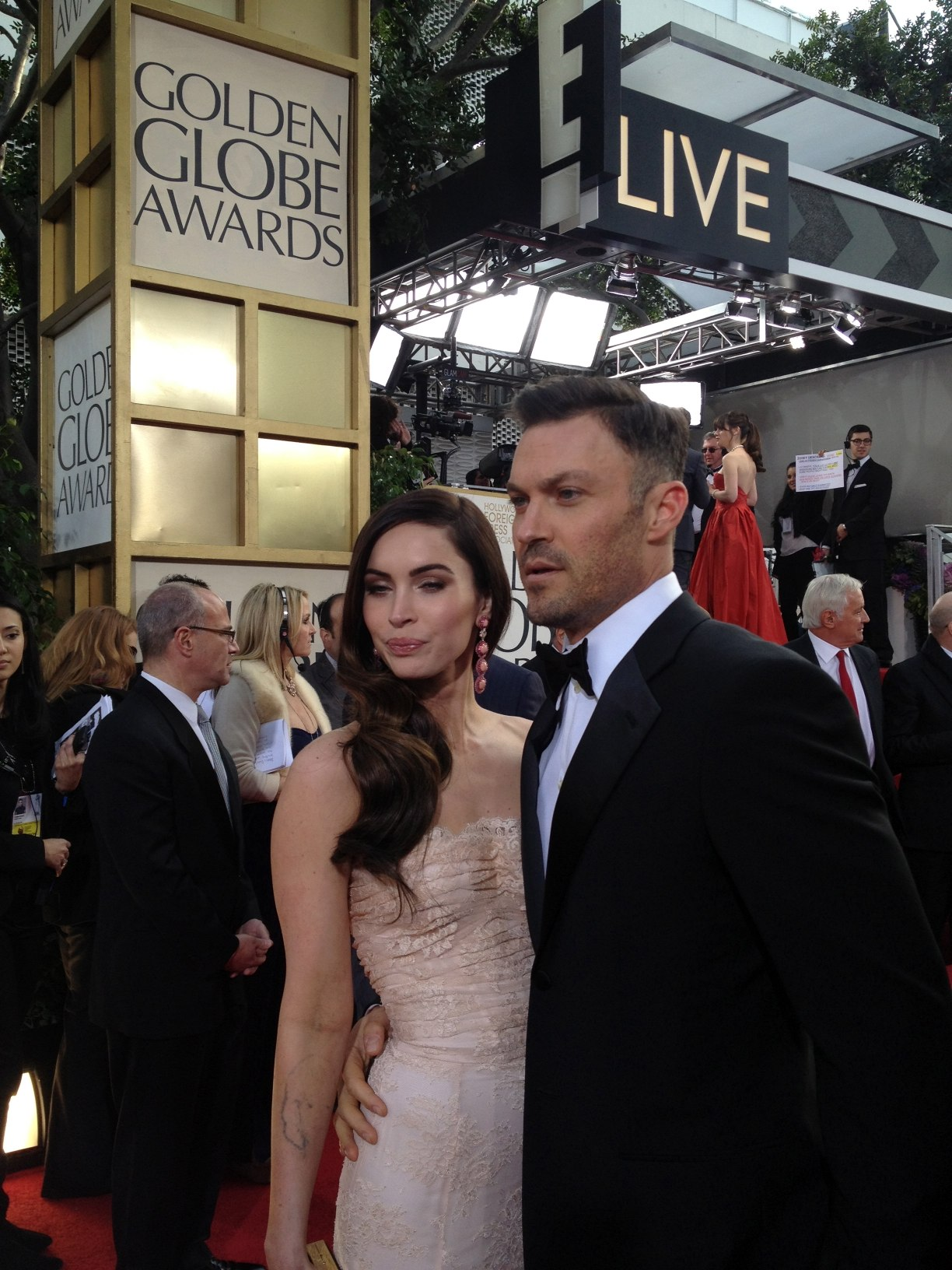
Fox and Brian Austin Green at the 70th Golden Globes on January 13, 2013

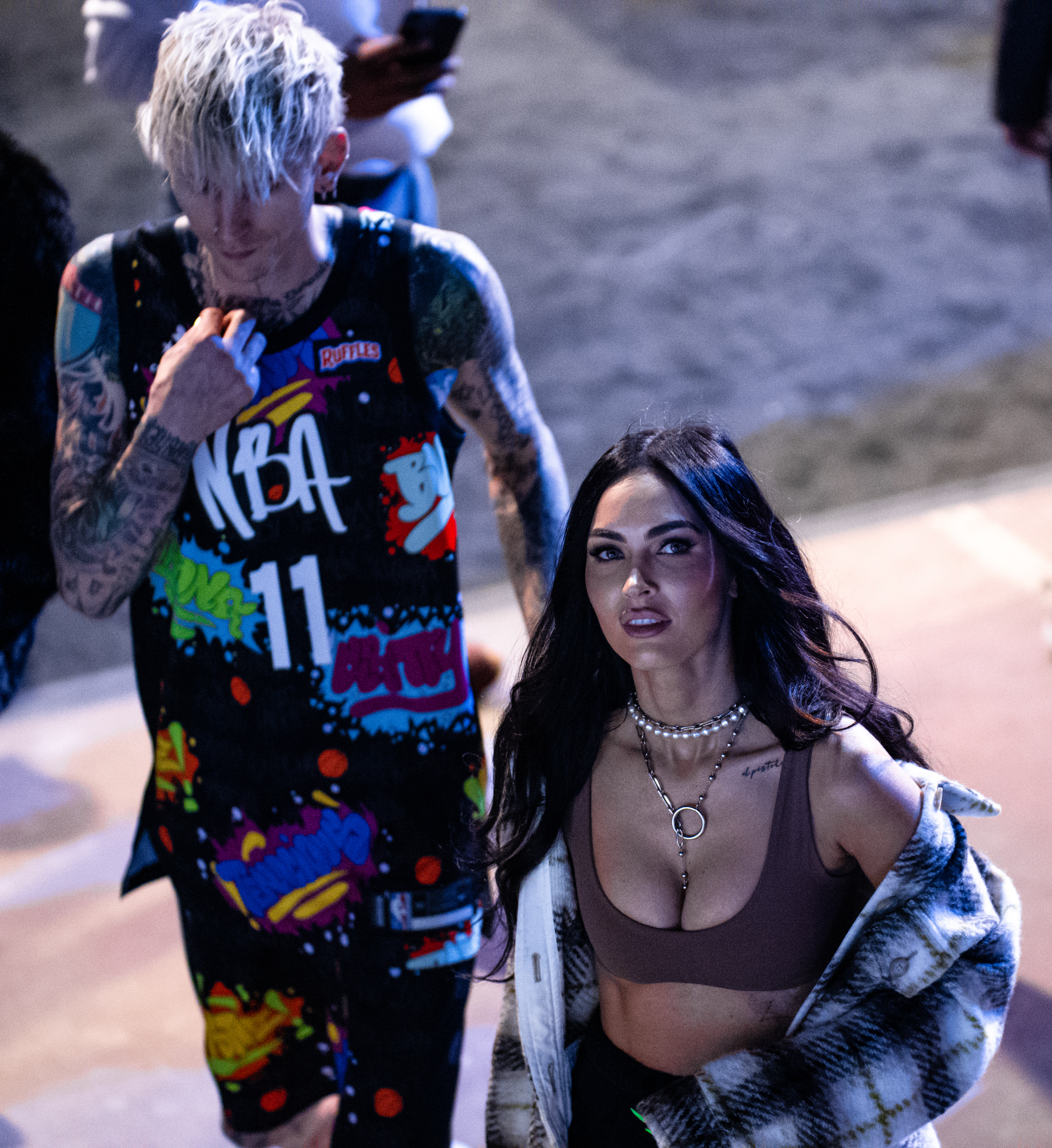
Machine Gun Kelly and Fox at the 2022 NBA Celebrity All-Star Game on February 18, 2022

Fox began dating actor Brian Austin Green in 2004 after meeting on the set of Hope & Faith; she was 18 and he was 30. According to Fox, Green was initially hesitant to enter a relationship because of the age difference, stating, "I had to convince him that I was slightly more responsible and well-spoken and had other things to bring to the table besides being 18." She also said that she had "fallen in love with other people all the time" during their relationship.

Fox and Green became engaged in November 2006. In February 2009, they ended their engagement, though reports stated that they became engaged again on June 1, 2010. Fox maintained that they had been continuously engaged since 2006. They married on June 24, 2010, in a private ceremony at the Four Seasons resort on the island of Hawaii. They have three sons, born in 2012, 2014, and 2016, and Fox became a stepmother to Green's son from a previous relationship. Fox filed for divorce on August 21, 2015, days after they announced their separation. By early 2016, they had reconciled and were expecting their third child. On April 25, 2019, Fox filed to dismiss the divorce in Los Angeles, California. In May 2020, Green announced that they had separated after nearly 10 years of marriage, and Fox filed for divorce again in November 2020. The divorce was finalized on October 15, 2021.

In June 2020, Fox and singer Machine Gun Kelly went public with their relationship, several weeks after the release of his song "Bloody Valentine", whose music video featured Fox. On January 12, 2022, Fox announced that they were engaged. On March 21, 2024, she revealed that the engagement had been called off. In November 2024, Fox announced on Instagram that she was expecting a child with him. On March 27, 2025, she gave birth to a daughter.

== Filmography ==
=== Film ===
Year	Title	Role	Notes	Ref.
2001	Holiday in the Sun	Brianna Wallace	Direct-to-video film	
2003	Bad Boys II	Bikini Kid Dancing Under Waterfall	Uncredited extra	
2004	Confessions of a Teenage Drama Queen	Carla Santini		
2007	Transformers	Mikaela Banes		
2008	How to Lose Friends & Alienate People	Sophie Maes		
2008	Whore	Lost		
2009	Transformers: Revenge of the Fallen	Mikaela Banes		
2009	Jennifer's Body	Jennifer Check		
2010	Jonah Hex	Tallulah Black / Lilah Black		
2010	Passion Play	Lily Luster		
2011	Friends with Kids	Mary Jane		
2012	The Dictator	Herself	Cameo appearance	
2012	This Is 40	Desi		
2014	Teenage Mutant Ninja Turtles	April O'Neil		
2016	Teenage Mutant Ninja Turtles: Out of the Shadows	April O'Neil		
2019	Above the Shadows	Juliana		
2019	Zeroville	Soledad Paladin	Completed in 2014	
2019	The Battle of Jangsari	Maggie		
2020	Think Like a Dog	Ellen Reed		
2020	Rogue	Samantha "Sam" O'Hara		
2021	Till Death	Emma Davenport		
2021	Midnight in the Switchgrass	Rebecca Lombardo		
2021	Night Teeth	Grace		
2022	Big Gold Brick	Jacqueline Deveraux		
2022	Taurus	Mae		
2022	Good Mourning	Kennedy		
2023	Johnny & Clyde	Alana Hart		
2023	Expend4bles	Agent Gina		
2024	Subservience	Alice		
2025	Five Nights at Freddy's 2	Toy Chica	Voice role	
2027	Untitled Jennifer's Body Sequel †	Jennifer Check	Filming	

=== Television ===
Year	Title	Role	Notes	Ref.
2002–2003	Ocean Ave.	Ione Starr	Main role; 69 episodes	
2003	What I Like About You	Shannon	Episode: "Like a Virgin (Kinda)"	
2004	Two and a Half Men	Prudence	Episode: "Camel Filters and Pheromones"	
2004	The Help	Cassandra Ridgeway	Main role; 3 episodes	
2004	Boss Girl	Candace	Television film	
2004–2006	Hope & Faith	Sydney Shanowski	Main role; 48 episodes (seasons 2–3)	
2009	Saturday Night Live	Herself (host)	Episode: "Megan Fox/U2"	
2011	Robot Chicken	Herself / Lois Lane (voice)	Episode: "The Core, the Thief, His Wife and Her Lover"	
2012	Robot Chicken DC Comics Special	Lois Lane (voice)	Television film	
2012	Wedding Band	Alexa Jordan	Episode: "I Love College"	
2016–2017	New Girl	Reagan Lucas	Recurring role; 15 episodes (seasons 5–6)	
2018	Legends of the Lost with Megan Fox	Herself (host)	Docuseries; 4 episodes (also co-creator and executive producer)	
2023	Dave	Herself	Episode: "Met Gala"	
2025	Overcompensating	Herself	Recurring role; 4 episodes	

=== Video games ===
Year	Title	Role	Notes
2007	Transformers: The Game	Mikaela Banes	
2009	Transformers: Revenge of the Fallen	Mikaela Banes	
2023	Mortal Kombat 1	Nitara	Voice and Facial model

=== Music videos ===
Year	Title	Artist	Role	Notes	Ref.
2009	"New Perspective"	Panic! at the Disco	Jennifer Check	Clips from Jennifer's Body	
2010	"Love the Way You Lie"	Eminem (featuring Rihanna)	Kimberly Scott		
2020	"Bloody Valentine"	Machine Gun Kelly	Herself		
2024	"Lonely Road"	Machine Gun Kelly and Jelly Roll	Herself		

== Awards and nominations ==
Fox has received numerous awards and nominations, including four Teen Choice Awards and two Scream Awards.
