= Mikaela Banes =

Transformers character

- Transformers character
- Banes, portrayed by Megan Fox in Transformers: Revenge of the Fallen
- First appearance: Transformers (2007)
- Last appearance: Transformers: Revenge of the Fallen (2009)
- Portrayed by: Megan Fox

In-universe information
- Significant other: Sam Witwicky

Mikaela Banes is a fictional character from the live action Transformers film series. The character is portrayed by Megan Fox in the first and second films and serves the role of Sam Witwicky's love interest and first girlfriend. The role served as a launching point for Megan Fox's career, although she later claimed to dislike the role. Megan Fox, and thus the character of Mikaela, was removed from the franchise after the first two films due to disagreements with director Michael Bay.

== Character history ==
When the breakdown for the 2007 Transformers film was sent to agents in 2005, the character of Mikaela Banes was described to Fox as "a 16-year-old Angelina Jolie". Fox took the role of Mikaela, who served as the love interest of Sam Witwicky, portrayed by Shia LaBeouf. Fox's role in the film promoted her rise to fame.

Fox returned for the sequel film, Transformers: Revenge of the Fallen. In this film, Mikaela confesses her love for Sam. However, Mikaela did not return for the third film, Transformers: Dark of the Moon, and was replaced by the character Carly, portrayed by Rosie Huntington-Whiteley. Dark of the Moon states that Sam "got dumped" off-screen between the films, explaining Mikaela's absence.

The reason that Fox did not return for Dark of the Moon was that she was fired from the film over comments she made about director Michael Bay. In a 2009 interview, Fox criticized Bay's directorial style, comparing him to Adolf Hitler. According to Michael Bay, executive producer Steven Spielberg urged him to fire Fox for the comment. Fox's firing was a major setback in her career. In response to her comment about Bay, three anonymous Transformers crew members wrote an open letter describing Fox as a "thankless, classless, graceless [...] unfriendly bitch" who showed up late, was rude to the crew, and was bad at acting. Bay did not condone the letter, but he published it to his website, leading to speculation that he was the one that wrote it.

== Reception ==
Fox's performance propelled her to household name status. Looper said that Fox had palpable chemistry with her onscreen love interest. According to Hindustan Times, the fact that she does not have to be saved added to the realism of Sam's character, while at the same time enhancing Mikaela's own. Comic Book Resources criticized Mikaela's character, saying that she "falls short in nearly every conceivable way." They also criticized the objectification of Megan Fox's body in the films.
