= Johnny & Clyde =

- Directed by: Tom DeNucci
- Written by: Tom DeNucci; Nick Principe
- Produced by: Nick Koskoff; Paul Luba; Chad Verdi Jr.; Chad A. Verdi; Michelle Verdi
- Starring: Megan Fox; Avan Jogia; Ajani Russell; Bai Ling
- Cinematography: Glenn Ciano
- Music by: Jason Soudah
- Production companies: Hyperborea Films; LaSalle Productions; Verdi Productions
- Distributed by: Screen Media; Redbox Entertainment
- Release date: 5 May 2023 (US)
- Running time: 100 minutes
- Country: United States
- Language: English

Johnny & Clyde is a 2023 American horror-heist film directed by Tom DeNucci, who co-wrote it with Nick Principe. The film stars Megan Fox, Avan Jogia, and Ajani Russell. The plot follows a pair of serial killers who assemble a team to rob a casino but become hunted by a demon guarding the cash room. The film received a 0% rating on Rotten Tomatoes and was nominated for two Golden Raspberry Awards, with Fox winning for Worst Actress.

== Plot ==
An investigative reporter meets with Four Horse Casino owner Alana Hart, questioning her about a killer called "Bakwas" who is apparently in her employ. The reporter refuses a $2 million offer to sign a non-disclosure agreement, so Alana kills her, arranging for a cover up, the disposal of the remains, and a false alibi.

A montage shows lovers and serial killers Johnny and Clyde on an indiscriminate crime spree. While getting fuel at a gas station, Johnny takes exception to the stuttering attendant wishing him a safe trip to Rhode Island, psychologically tortures him, then shoots him for a candy bar and a handful of cash. Randall Lock, an overweight, alcoholic former sheriff whose daughter was tortured and killed by the duo, sees a news report that Johnny and Clyde have returned to Rhode Island, and hires bail bondsman One Time to help gain revenge.

Johnny and Clyde rob one of the casino's armored cars and torture a guard for information about Alana's secret cash room. They use the guard as a human shield when ambushed by Lock and One Time and are able to escape when maniacal killer Zhang makes an indiscriminate attack to cause chaos.

To help rob the casino, Johnny assembles a team of his equally murderous foster-care brothers: suicidal thrill-seeker Butcher, insane arsonist Baker, and paranoid conspiracy theorist Candlestick. Candlestick warns them that the satanic cult of the demon Bakwas performed a mass suicide at the site where the cash room was built.

The casino's head of security Guy suspects the serial killers, and Lock informs Alana of their intention to rob her secret cash room. This provokes Alana to have the Elder of the cult perform a ritual, empowering Alana to use a mystical stone to control Bakwas and force him to guard her casino. To maintain the secret of the stone, Alana then kills the Elder.

In preparation for the heist, Johnny's crew take an excessive amount of illegal drugs. They kill the perimeter guards, then Baker accidentally kills himself while using explosive charges to open the door. The crew enter the building and are quickly surrounded by Lock and One Time, who are waiting in ambush, and Zhang, who follows behind them. This Mexican standoff is interrupted by Alana's announcement that the building has been locked and everyone will be dead by sunrise. Bakwas appears and kills One Time.

Johnny's crew descend toward the basement cash room, killing a series of guards. Guy's elite team traps them but are killed by Bakwas, and Guy realizes that he has been betrayed as Alana is eliminating every possible witness. Guy gives his team permission to abandon their posts. It is revealed that Alana already moved all the money and is preparing to leave town and reunite with her father.

After Candlestick and Butcher are killed, Johnny and Clyde try to escape with a bag of counterfeit money. Zhang, on orders from Alana's father, gets them out of the building. Lock, who is once again waiting in ambush, kills Zhang and beats Johnny. When Clyde holds Lock at gunpoint, Lock reveals that Johnny killed her father and concealed the crime. Clyde shoots Lock and pistol-whips Johnny, but calls his actions romantic. Bakwas confronts them and while the demon cannot leave the site, it throws its machetes at Johnny and Clyde, killing them. Lock, who is wearing a bulletproof vest, recovers to gleefully view their dead bodies before Bakwas kills him.

Guy is the only one to escape, and confronts Alana at gunpoint, demanding the stone. She gives it to him and, although she believes that she still controls Bakwas, the demon rips out her beating heart. Guy offers to treat the demon with "respect and dignity", but it kills him and places the stone in its body.

== Cast ==
- Megan Fox as Alana Hart
- Avan Jogia as Johnny
- Ajani Russell as Clyde
- Tyson Ritter as Guy, the casino's head of security
- Bai Ling as Zhang, an assassin
- Vanessa Angel as Susan, a reporter
- Robert LaSardo as Candlestick
- Armen Garo as Randall Lock, a former sheriff
- Sean Ringgold as One Time, a bail bondsman
- Nick Principe in a dual role as Butcher and Bakwas
- Charles W. Harris III as Baker
- Brett Azar and Sydney Jenkins as Honey and Pot, Alana's bondage-wearing servants and constant companions
- Claudio Orefice as Wealthy Tycoon
- Fred Sullivan as The Elder

== Writing and development ==
The film was co-written by Nick Principe and director Tom DeNucci. They learned that Verdi Productions wanted to produce a tense, avant garde horror film and thought it would be a good fit for some characters they had previously been developing. They finished the script in May 2021 and pitched it as a heist film that turns into a slasher-horror. Verdi quickly approved it, allowing them to begin shooting principal photography by September.

In an interview for website Macabre Daily, DeNucci stated that he and Principe wrote the script as "a love letter to the horror and action movies of the 1980s and 1990s." He described the characters as "cartoons of serial killers" with no logic to their actions. DeNucci was inspired to make the character Alana like an evil version of a Disney Princess.

== Production ==
Before going into pre-production, DeNucci watched a documentary on Walt Disney and noted his meticulous planning; coupled with DeNucci's eagerness to direct after the industry was shut down during the COVID-19 pandemic, this motivated him to approach the film with seriousness and determination. Rather than drawing storyboards, he placed G.I. Joe action figures on miniature sets so that he could practically test how to light the scenes and place the camera.

Produced by Chad A. Verdi and financed by Verdi Productions, filming began in the second half of 2021 in Rhode Island. Fox's scenes were filmed first to accommodate her schedule, before the remainder of the cast was assembled. Casting was announced in October 2021, with Avan Jogia as Johnny, Ajani Russell as Clyde, and Tyson Ritter as casino head of security Guy.

Principe coordinated the fight sequences and had a number of professional wrestlers in the stunt crew. On screen, he played Johnny's foster brother Butcher and the main slasher character. The film uses practical effects achieved by Doug Sakmann, with a minimal amount of CGI in post-production.

The 100-minute film was released in theatres and video-on-demand on 5 May 2023, by Screen Media.

== Reception ==
Critical reviews for Johnny & Clyde were negative. On the review aggregator website Rotten Tomatoes, 0% of 11 critics' reviews are positive.

On Common Sense Media, Jeffrey Anderson rated the film 1 star, calling it "vaguely annoying and ultimately empty" and noting the gratuitous gory violence, drug use, partial nudity, and relentless obscene language.

RogerEbert.com and Black Girl Nerds noted that the deaths of Baker and One Time fulfill the "brother always dies first" trope, as they are the only male African-American characters in the film.

=== Accolades ===
Award / Film Festival	Date of ceremony	Category	Recipient(s)	Result	Ref.
Golden Raspberry Awards	9 March 2024	Worst Actress	Megan Fox	Won	
Golden Raspberry Awards	9 March 2024	Worst Supporting Actress	Bai Ling	Nominated	

== See also ==
- Bonnie and Clyde
- List of films with a 0% rating on Rotten Tomatoes
