= Beast Machines: Transformers =

1999 animated TV series

- Beast Machines: Transformers complete series DVD boxset
- Also known as: Beast Machines: Battle for the Spark (season 2)
- Genre: Action-adventure; Science fantasy
- Based on: Transformers by Hasbro
- Developed by: Marty Isenberg; Robert N. Skir
- Theme music composer: Leftfield
- Opening theme: "Phat Planet"
- Composer: Robert Buckley
- Countries of origin: Canada; United States
- Original language: English
- No. of seasons: 2
- No. of episodes: 26

Production
- Executive producers: Ian Pearson; Mark Ralston
- Producer: Asaph Fipke
- Running time: 21 minutes
- Production companies: Mainframe Entertainment; Hasbro

Original release
- Network: Fox Kids (United States); YTV (Canada); Tokyo MX (Japan)
- Release: September 18, 1999 – November 18, 2000

Related
- Beast Wars: Transformers

Beast Machines: Transformers is an animated television series produced by Mainframe Entertainment as part of the Transformers franchise. Hasbro has full distribution rights to the show as of 2011. It was a direct sequel to Beast Wars, taking place within the continuity of the original Transformers series. The show ran for two seasons, airing on YTV and Fox Kids from September 18, 1999 to November 18, 2000. Of the Transformers animated series produced in North America, Beast Machines was the only one to have been completely conceptualized and outlined in advance, lending it a more serialized and linear storyline than the others.

== Synopsis ==
Following their victory in Beast Wars, four of the surviving Maximals – Optimus Primal, Cheetor, Blackarachnia and Rattrap – finally return to Cybertron only to discover that their people have vanished, and the world is now ruled by the mindless Vehicons. The quartet are trapped in their beast modes without any of the upgrades they gained during their time on Earth – and they are swiftly losing their memories of anything but each other and two of their missing comrades. Forced to retreat deep underground, the Maximals discover the Oracle, a powerful supercomputer that reformats their bodies into new, even more powerful techno-organic forms.

The Maximals soon learn that their old enemy Megatron – who managed to break free and return to Cybertron before them – is the malevolent intelligence behind the Vehicons. Megatron is set to eradicate the Maximals and ensure his newly conquered Cybertron is in a state of technological purity free of organic life and free will, imprisoning the sparks of Cyberton's entire population. With the odds stacked against them, the Maximals set out to free the sparks of their people, and bring organic life to Cyberton once more.

== Cast ==
- Garry Chalk as Optimus Primal
- Scott McNeil as Rattrap, Silverbolt, Waspinator
- Ian James Corlett as Cheetor
- Venus Terzo as Blackarachnia
- David Kaye as Megatron, Savage/Noble
- Christopher Gaze as Diagnostic Drone
- Brian Drummond as Jetstorm
- Paul Dobson as Tankor, Obsidian, Diagnostic Drone #2
- Jim Byrnes as Thrust
- Alessandro Juliani as Nightscream
- Richard Newman as Rhinox
- Kathleen Barr as Botanica
- Patricia Drake as Strika

== Production ==
According to the commentary of the Beast Machines DVD, the series was initially to be called Beast Hunters. The character Jetstorm was initially called Skybolt, but the writers changed the name to make it harder to theorize Silverbolt's connection to the Vehicon. The first five episodes of the series were filed with the name Skybolt, and later edited to reflect the change. At one point, Thrust was going to be carrying Silverbolt's spark, but the writers, on a whim, decided to have him carry Waspinator's spark instead. In the episode "Home Soil", the character Thrust made a gesture similar to the middle-finger to Optimus while racing to the crashed ship and in the episode "Savage Noble", Thrust also made a gesture similar to the middle-finger to Cheetor when they briefly banded together to search for Savage. In the flashback featuring Waspinator, the heads of Inferno and Quickstrike make cameo appearances, as do the pre-humans Hammer, Jack, Una, and others.

== Episodes ==
=== Series overview ===
Season	Episodes	Originally released	
Season	Episodes	First released	Last released
1	13	September 18, 1999	December 18, 1999
2	13	August 5, 2000	November 18, 2000

=== Season 1 (1999) ===
No. overall	No. in season	Title	Directed by	Written by	Original release date
1	1	"The Reformatting"	William Lau	Marty Isenberg & Bob Skir	September 18, 1999
On a desolate Cybertron, Optimus Primal finds himself being pursued by a horde of mindless tank vehicon drones, having lost his memory of how he arrived, his ability to transform into robot mode, and his transmetal upgraded body. A mysterious signal guides Optimus to his Maximal comrades Rattrap, Cheetor, and Blackarachnia, but the other three also cannot remember returning to Cybertron or losing the upgrades they gained on prehistoric Earth during the Beast Wars. The four Maximals descend into Cybertron's underground to escape the Vehicons, where they discover an ancient supercomputer named the Oracle. The Oracle requests that Optimus "restore the balance" and reformats the Maximals into new techno-organic bodies, perfect fusions of the biological and the mechanical. More Cycle Vehicon drones attack, but the Maximals still find themselves unable to transform; Optimus realizes they must recenter themselves and is able to transform into his robot mode and destroys the drones, vowing to help his friends master their new bodies and restore their homeworld. Meanwhile, a mysterious figure is informed of the Maximals' return.
2	2	"Master of the House"	Steve Sacks	Marty Isenberg & Bob Skir	September 25, 1999
Under Optimus' tutelage, Cheetor and Blackarachnia briefly transform into robot mode, but Rattrap cannot master his new form. Optimus fends off another vehicon attack and suggests the Maximals split up to search for a new base, but Blackarachnia goads Cheetor into accompanying her on the surface to look for more information on their missing memories. They are attacked by Aero Vehicons after finding the capital city of Cybertropolis deserted and its central data core wiped clean, and Optimus and Rattrap arrive to save them. As the other three Maximals continue evading more drones, Optimus enters the chamber of the Maximal Elders and finds the drones' leader: Megatron, the mysterious figure encased in a massive suit of control armor. Megatron claims that he conquered Cybertron after escaping the Maximals' captivity, disposing of its populace and remolding it into a perfect technological wasteland. Optimus goads Megatron into transforming into his dragon beast mode, deactivating the drones, but Megatron reasserts control as the other Maximals drag a grief-stricken Optimus to safety.
3	3	"Fires of the Past"	John Pozer	Marv Wolfman	October 2, 1999
Rattrap barely escapes a Vehicon strike on the Cybertron Archives building, having found the planet's information network completely deleted. The watching Megatron gloats at his conquest of Cybertronian history but quickly turns to fury as the Maximals escape and Optimus destroys a squadron of Tank Vehicons. Megatron decides to try a different tactic as Blackarachnia, compelled by visions of a mysterious Maximal, returns to the surface for more clues. Megatron sends three new Vehicon Generals to stop them, each imbued with a Cybertronian spark: Tankor, Jetstorm, and Thrust. Blackarachnia is joined by Rattrap, and the two escape the Vehicon Generals and find the Autobot shuttle they used to arrive on Cybertron. Tapping into its computer systems, Blackarachina suddenly remembers their missing friends Rhinox and Silverbolt, but Megatron attempts to discern the location of the Maximal base from her connection. The Vehicon Generals destroy the Autobot shuttle just as Optimus and Cheetor rescue their friends and escape, no closer to finding their missing memories than before.
4	4	"Mercenary Pursuits"	Raul Sanchez Inglis	Michael Reaves	October 9, 1999
As Megatron promises to reward the Vehicon Generals if they capture the Maximals, Optimus detects the presence of a familiar spark while meditating. As the Maximals search for the spark, Rattrap finds a transformation enhancer within an abandoned laboratory and steals it, hoping to finally transform into his robot mode. The enhancer works but Rattrap finds himself unable to control his transformations, alerting Tankor to their position. The durable but dim-witted Vehicon captures them and brings them before Megatron, but Optimus breaks free of his bonds and convinces the spark within Tankor to help them escape. He does so, but Megatron reasserts control over Tankor and forces the Maximals to flee again. Later, Optimus admits to the other Maximals he sensed something familiar about Tankor's spark but was unable to identify it.
5	5	"Forbidden Fruit"	Trenton Carlson	Steven Melching	October 16, 1999
As the Maximals continue training to master the art of transformation, the bitter Rattrap engages in an argument with Optimus, but their quarrel is cut short by the discovery of a live organic bat. The bat flees deep into Cybertron's underground but claims to be a Maximal upon capture. The bat Maximal helps fend off Jetstorm and a squadron of Aero Vehicons, telling Optimus that he escaped Megatron's conquest of Cybertron by falling deep underground and finding an organic fruit tree, shocking the others. Suspicious of the new Maximal, Cheetor refuses to taste the fruit, but the other three Maximals are incapacitated and unable to stop Jetstorm from returning and shooting the bat. Cheetor destroys the tree and restores the others, but Optimus chooses to reformat the bat into a techno-organic body, who introduces himself as Nightscream.
6	6	"The Weak Component"	Andrew Currie	Rodney Gibbs	October 23, 1999
With Optimus incapacitated after Nightscream's reformatting, Rattrap and Cheetor take the new Maximal on a scouting mission but encounter a legion of Vehicon drones. Rattrap finally transforms into robot mode and learns that Megatron is currently weakened, but is disappointed to find his new body unarmed and earns the ire of the other Maximals by accidentally spoiling an ambush on Tankor. Rattrap cannot convince the others of Megatron's weakness and so leaves to make a deal with the devil: if Rattrap protects Megatron for one night while he heals, Megatron will provide him with weaponry and allow him to go free. Megatron agrees, but the other Maximals arrive and force Rattrap to fire on his friends. Optimus arrives and convinces Rattrap to stand down, but Rattrap instead notes that night has passed and he has kept his word. Impressed, Megatron allows the Maximals to leave as promised.
7	7	"Revelations, Part I: Discovery"	James Taylor	Brynne Chandler Reaves	October 30, 1999
The Maximals fend off Thrust and a horde of Cycle Drones and find themselves in a junkyard of Cybertronian bodies with their sparks extracted. Jetstorm and Tankor arrive to support Thrust, but Thrust unexpectedly saves Blackarachnia from falling debris and ends up trapped with her inside an abandoned factory. As the other Maximals rush to save Blackarachnia from the factory before it explodes, Thrust again refuses to attack Blackarachnia, instead commenting that he remembers fighting alongside her from Earth and the Beast Wars. The factory comes to life and attempts to extract their sparks, but Thrust allows Blackarachnia enough time to shut down the machine and escape. As the factory explodes, Cheetor forcibly relieves the grief-stricken Optimus from command, and Blackarachnia theorizes that Thrust contains a Maximal spark, most likely Silverbolt's. The other Maximals resolve to help free the three Maximal sparks trapped within the Vehicon Generals.
8	8	"Revelations, Part II: Descent"	William Lau	Marv Wolfman	November 6, 1999
As Optimus pushes his teammates away to continue receiving visions from the Oracle, Cheetor devises a plan to free the Vehicon Generals from Megatron's control, starting with Tankor. As Nightscream and Blackarachnia distract Jetstorm and Thrust respectively, Cheetor corners Tankor long enough for Rattrap to access his memories. However, Rattrap finds memories of their arrival on Cybertron, seen through another Maximal's point of view...Megatron, strapped to the hull of the Autobot shuttle, broke free and disappeared into transwarp space, and the Maximals were immediately shot down by satellites upon entering Cybertron's orbit. The six were quickly set upon by hordes of Vehicon drones and bombed by a strange green gas that devolved the Transmetal Maximals into their original bodies and paralyzed Rhinox and Silverbolt. As Jetstorm overpowers Nightscream and extracts Blackarachnia's spark, Rattrap realizes with horror that Tankor is Rhinox.
9	9	"Revelations, Part III: Apocalypse!"	George Samilski	Steven Melching	November 13, 1999
Nightscream pursues Jetstorm with Blackarachnia's disembodied spark as Optimus receives another disconcerting vision from the Oracle, in which he is trapped in a field of plants being transformed into metal. Tankor awakens and continues attacking Cheetor and Rattrap while Nightscream ambushes Jetstorm and reclaims Blackarachnia's spark. However, it refuses to return to Blackarachnia's body, and Optimus telepathically helps her reclaim control of her body. As the other two Maximals join Cheetor and Rattrap, Rhinox's consciousness finally takes control of Tankor's body; however, the Vehicon programming has fundamentally changed him, and his spirit angrily informs Optimus that he now believes in Megatron's vision of a purely technological Cybertron, albeit with himself as its leader. Reawakening with Rhinox's intelligence and now-twisted personality, Tankor refuses to accept the Maximals' help, and Optimus sadly lets him go, informing the other Maximals that the Oracle has charged them with restoring nature to Cybertron.
10	10	"Survivor"	Dennis Heaton	Brynne Chandler Reaves	November 27, 1999
In yet another bid to purge himself of his organic body, Megatron orders the Vehicon Generals and one of his Diagnostic Drones to capture Nightscream and reverse-engineer the means by which he unknowingly adopted a new body. Meanwhile, Nightscream informs the Maximals that Cybertronians adopted built-in DNA scanners while they were trapped on prehistoric Earth, rather than using stasis pods and protoforms, but the Generals ambush them and kidnap Nightscream. Nightscream attacks the Diagnostic Drone and escapes with Jetstorm and Thrust in pursuit, but Tankor stays behind to repair the Drone and reprogram it into serving him. The other Maximals fend off Jetstorm and Thrust while Optimus and Nightscream find a bat-like fossil embedded in a wall, causing them to realize that Cybertron once sustained organic life. As they plant a seed from Nightscream's fruit tree in organic soil, the Diagnostic Drone informs Tankor that it has located the Oracle.
11	11	"The Key"	Sean Osborne	Marv Wolfman	December 4, 1999
Tankor and the Diagnostic Drone arrive before the Oracle, revealed to be the ancient Cybertronian supercomputer Vector Sigma. Although Tankor is unable to access the Oracle, the sparkless Diagnostic Drone successfully enters and emerges with the Key to Vector Sigma, a legendary artifact with the power to convert organic entities into technomatter. While digging for water to fuel their growing orchard of organic trees, the Maximals encounter a reservoir of green goop that instantly sprouts the young seeds into full-grown trees, which Optimus considers another sign from the Oracle. Tankor arrives and shoots the orchard and Nightscream with the Key to Vector Sigma before overloading from its power; the trees are converted into technomatter while Nightscream's body is slowly overcome by the infection. The green goop proves enough to slow the conversion process, but the increasingly-unstable Nightscream infects Blackarachnia as the other Maximals hijack one of Megatron's Mole Drones to drill for more goop. They return to the orchard and uncover enough goop to cure Nightscream and Blackarachnia and restore the trees, while Tankor is revealed to have faked his death with a holographic copy and claims the Key.
12	12	"The Catalyst"	Steve Sacks	Marty Isenberg & Bob Skir	December 11, 1999
The Maximals begin supplying the orchard with the green goop as Tankor's Diagnostic Drone convinces Megatron to attach copies of the Key to Vector Sigma to the Tank Drone army. Rattrap discovers a catalyst program that dramatically increases the plants' growth and aggression while Blackarachnia attempts to ambush Thrust and restore his Maximal personality with the green goop. However, she discovers with horror that Thrust does not contain Silverbolt's spark – rather, he is Waspinator, who was left behind on Earth at the end of the Beast Wars and somehow returned to Cybertron. Jetstorm attempts to capture Blackarachnia and is accidentally doused with the goop, revealing Silverbolt's personality within him. As Optimus tries and fails to access the Oracle, Silverbolt and Waspinator are reverted to their Jetstorm and Thrust personas and the other Maximals save Blackarachnia.
13	13	"End of the Line"	Mark Sawers	Steven Melching	December 18, 1999
As Megatron finishes loading copies of the Key to Vector Sigma into the Vehicons, Tankor manipulates the Oracle to help the Maximals discover another ancient Cybertronian artifact: the Plasma Energy Chamber. Optimus wants to use the power of the Plasma Energy Chamber to permanently deactivate anything technological on Cybertron, but Cheetor convinces him to buy Rattrap enough time to disables the Vehicon Keys. Megatron destroys Tankor's Diagnostic Drone and orders a preemptive strike on the Maximals to prevent them from unleashing the power of the Plasma Energy Chamber. A furious Tankor infects Rattrap and the other Maximals with technomatter as Optimus attacks Megatron. Optimus is also infected by technomatter and when Tankor attempts to attack Megatron, his Vehicon programming prevents him from doing so, and the Maximal leader telepathically opens the Plasma Energy Chamber. In response, Megatron orders the Vehicons to activate the Keys, and the two energies create a maelstrom that consumes Cybertron.

=== Season 2 (2000): Battle for the Spark ===
No. overall	No. in season	Title	Directed by	Written by	Original release date
14	1	"Fallout"	Raul Sanchez Inglis	Robert N. Skir & Marty Isenberg	August 5, 2000
Optimus and Megatron are disintegrated while battling with the powers of the Plasma Energy Chamber and the Key to Vector Sigma. Optimus finds himself inside the afterlife again, where he comes to terms with his fanatical servitude to the Oracle and meets with a regretful Rhinox for the last time. As Optimus experiences visions of Maximals he knows, he successfully disperses the dueling energies of the Key and the Chamber into the void. Now the only living things on Cybertron, the remaining Maximals attempt to restore Silverbolt and Waspinator from the Vehicon Generals, but are rejected and instead return to the Oracle's chamber. There, they find a revived Optimus, who apologizes for his cruel and selfish behavior and informs them of their true mission from the Oracle: to restore balance between the organic and the technological on Cybertron. As the Maximals decide to find and liberate the collected sparks of Cybertron's populace, they encounter a gigantic floating replica of Megatron's head on the surface.
15	2	"Savage Noble"	Greg Donis	Len Wein	August 19, 2000
Although the Maximals brace for an attack, they quickly realize the giant head is unresponsive. Optimus attempts to locate Megatron's spark while the other Maximals continue searching for Jetstorm and Thrust. The Vehicon Generals ambush them but are in turn ambushed by a strange organic dragon-like creature. Jetstorm and Thrust reluctantly agree to help destroy the creature, but the Maximals are separated from them and find a wolf-like Maximal named Noble, who Nightscream immediately bonds with over their shared survival. Noble disappears as the Vehicons continue hunting for the dragon creature (now nicknamed Savage); Savage ambushes Rattrap and the Maximals corner it long enough for Nightscream to calm it down, whereupon it transforms into Noble. Optimus vows to help Noble control his other half.
16	3	"Prometheus Unbound"	Sebastian Brodin	Marv Wolfman	August 26, 2000
Noble has continually disappeared each night in an attempt to break into Megatron's giant head fortress, to the concern of the other Maximals. Nightscream alone supports Noble, but Optimus orders the two to stay behind while they infiltrate the fortress looking for Cybertron's sparks. Noble and Nightscream follow the team anyway, where Noble continually sabotages the Maximals' attempts at stealth and activates numerous deadly traps to slow their progress. Noble sneaks away and enters the control room, triumphantly extracting a spark from his body and revealing himself to be Megatron. Now in control of the giant head, Megatron reactivates Cybertron's systems and the Vehicon army, forcing the Maximals and a distraught Nightscream to retreat.
17	4	"In Darkest Knight"	George Samilski	Steven Melching	September 2, 2000
As Nightscream's search for any remnant of Savage/Noble is cut short by Jetstorm and Thrust, Rattrap combines a DNA scanner and a spark extractor to help reformat any new sparks the Maximals free. Blackarachnia steals the device as the Maximals save Nightscream, but the fight is quickly cut short as Megatron captures Optimus and Cheetor, the feral Savage/Noble drags Nightscream away, and Blackarachnia, at last, reformats Jetstorm into a technorganic Silverbolt using Rattrap's devices. However, Silverbolt's time as a Vehicon has warped his once goofy and chivalrous personality into a dark and brooding loner who hates himself and his willingness to follow Megatron's ideology. Rattrap helps Nightscream escape from the mindless Savage/Noble as Megatron interrogates Optimus and Cheetor for information on manipulating Cybertron's collected sparks for his use. Blackarachnia and Silverbolt arrive, and the latter rejects Megatron's dogma and helps free the Maximals. Although Silverbolt is hesitant about rejoining the Maximals, Blackarachnia promises to support him no matter what.
18	5	"A Wolf In The Fold"	William Lau	Brynne Chandler Reaves	September 9, 2000
Although the Maximals are happy to have Silverbolt back, they cannot shake the gloom of losing Rhinox, but their break is cut short when Megatron's head fortress begins drilling tentacles into Cybertron's underground. One tentacle finds the Maximals and infects Silverbolt with a strange red virus, which is quickly passed onto the others and dramatically increases their aggression. Unable to control his teammates, Optimus attacks the head alone while the others violently squabble, but Megatron captures him for a philosophical debate while Thrust leads an army of Cycle Vehicons to destroy the Maximals. During brief lapses in the fighting and infighting, the Maximals surmise that they have been infected with a new variant of an ancient Cybertronian disease known as the Hate Plague; Optimus leaves the fortress to save the Maximals but is also infected by the virus. The Maximal leader somehow encourages his comrades to mentally purge the Hate Plague from their systems as the head fortress attacks again, and they successfully cure themselves and escape underground.
19	6	"Home Soil"	Dennis Heaton	Meg McLaughlin	September 16, 2000
A mysterious spaceship approaching Cybertron is shot down by Megatron's orbital satellites and crashlands on the surface. Silverbolt and Rattrap report the crash as the other Maximals worry about the wilting techno-organic orchard, but the journey to the crash site turns into a race when Thrust and a squad of Cycle Vehicons engage them. The Maximals split up to cover more ground, and reach the crashed ship only to be attacked by a strange plant monster, which escapes underground and inadvertently threatens the orchard. Optimus channels the power of the Oracle and reformats the plant monster into a techno-organic Cybertronian, who introduces herself as a Maximal named Botanica. Like Optimus, Botanica once captained a Maximal exploration vessel and adopted the plant-based form of her assigned world's lifeforms, but the crashlanding shorted out her higher functions. As thanks for restoring her, Botanica drives away a group of Tank Vehicons and adjusts the orchard's lighting to revitalize the techno-organic plants. The head fortress destroys Botanica's ship as Megatron vows to finally crush the growing Maximal resistance.
20	7	"Sparkwar Part I: The Strike"	Steve Sacks	Brooks Wachtel	September 23, 2000
To Thrust's consternation, the Maximals easily destroy a squadron of his Cycle Vehicons and salvage their parts for Botanica's research into Cybertron's organic core. Optimus defends their newest recriut's pacifism as Thrust and Megatron argue about the Maximals' victories; Megatron decides to implant two sparks into two brand-new Vehicon Generals, who ignore Thrust's boastings and prepare to engage the Maximals. Botanica continues researching the green goop as the Maximals encounter the new Generals, who lure them into an ambush before introducing themselves as Obsidian and Strika. Botanica is assaulted by strange visions of her past and present friends in danger as Obsidian and Strika use their tactical genius and wealth of battle experience to herd the Maximals into a corner. The Maximals are only saved by Botanica's intervention, and Megatron congratulates Obsidian and Strika for their loyalty despite failing to capture the Maximals. Despite the new enemies, Optimus thanks Botanica for her assistance and vows to continue searching for the missing sparks.
21	8	"Sparkwar Part II: The Search"	Gino Nichele	Michael Reaves	September 30, 2000
As Megatron deploys Obsidian, Strika, and Thrust in preparation for a Maximal attack, Rattrap completes work on small cloaking devices that should theoretically conceal them from the Vehicon scanners. Optimus receives visions from the Oracle and splits the Maximals up to go search the locations; Cheetor, Blackarachnia, and Silverbolt are ambushed by Obsidian, Rattrap and Botanica are attacked by Strika, and Optimus and Nightscream travel deeper underground and discover the ruins of the ancient Autobot city Iacon. There, Nightscream is ambushed by Thrust while Optimus speaks with a holographic replica of his ancestor Optimus Prime, which turns out to be Megatron in disguise. Megatron informs him that he gave the Maximals false visions to separate Optimus and extract the Oracle's remaining knowledge from him. The Maximals fend off Obsidian and Strika and retreat while Savage/Noble saves Nightscream, and Optimus informs the team that he also extracted information from Megatron: the location of the sparks, inside the head fortress.
22	9	"Sparkwar Part III: The Siege"	Luke Carroll	Steven Melching	October 7, 2000
As the Maximals watch Obsidian, Strika, and a horde of Vehicons refuel Megatron's head fortress, the feral Noble appears and accidentally exposes their position. Cheetor orders Nightscream to send Noble away as their plan to save the sparks commences, while Megatron abandons his body and begins consuming the missing sparks with his own spark. Rattrap's improved cloaking devices allow the infiltration group enough time to enter the head fortress, but Strika finds one of the discarded devices and reconfigures it to deactivate the others. The Maximals evade Thrust and at last find the massive containment unit with the other sparks, but Megatron's spark appears and begins absorbing them en masse. The other Maximals' sparks are also nearly extracted, but Noble sacrifices himself to save Nightscream, who disrupts the process with a sonic blast, seemingly vaporizing Megatron's spark and resealing the containment unit. The Maximals find themselves in control of the sparks and the head fortress but mourn the loss of Noble.
23	10	"Spark of Darkness"	Greg Donis	Nick Dubois	October 28, 2000
Although Optimus celebrates Megatron's seeming demise, some of the other Maximals are unconvinced he is truly dead. Regardless, the Maximals split up to begin restoring Cybertron's populace: Cheetor and Nightscream leave to find the Vehicon Generals, Blackarachnia and Silverbolt start inspecting the scrapped Cybertronian bodies to see whether any of them can still host sparks, and Rattrap and Botanica return to the techno-organic orchard. The latter two kiss in the midst of a heated argument as Blackarachnia and Silverbolt are attacked by a massive lumbering zombie, which soon explodes and discharges a strange red spark. The red spark possesses a broken Cycle Drone and attacks the orchard, but Botanica quickly destroys it and sends the spark away once more. With the Maximals now in control of Cybertron's future, Obsidian and Strika agree to support them, but the red spark animates a discarded Aero Drone and nearly kills Nightscream before being forced away again. As Obsidian and Strika are welcomed into the Maximal fold, the red spark attacks the group again; Rattrap repolarizes the spark and traps it inside a Diagnostic Drone. Alive once more, Megatron reactivates the head fortress's defenses and attempts to destroy the Maximals, but Obsidian and Strika grab him and retreat, where he decides to end things permanently.
24	11	"Endgame Part I: The Downward Spiral"	Angela Stevenson	Michael Reaves	November 4, 2000
Megatron restarts production of the Vehicon drones and orders Thrust, Obsidian, and Strika to lead an attack on the head fortress while he constructs himself a new body of "suitable irony." Optimus refuses to release the sparks into bodies, fearing that Megatron will recapture them. The Maximals, unable to access the head fortress's weapons, divert all power to the shields. Nightscream, Silverbolt, and Blackarachnia use Rattrap's reconfigured cloaking devices to disguise Vehicons as Maximals, sending the drones into disarray, while Botanica is cut off from Cybertron's organic core and is forced to leave the head fortress. Silverbolt's team destroys the drone factories while Strika uses Botanica's escape pod technology to breach the shields and shoot down the head fortress. Rattrap uses the last of the ship's power to shield the spark containment unit as the Maximals regroup within the wreckage and prepare for their final stand.
25	12	"Endgame Part II: When Legends Fall"	George Samilski	Steven Melching	November 11, 2000
Vehicons surround the crashed head fortress as the Maximals ready themselves; Optimus speaks with the Oracle one final time, and the collected sparks grant the Maximals a temporary power boost. Megatron orders the Vehicons to attack, but the drones are stymied by Rattrap's last-minute reactivation of the shield. However, the shield soon falls, and Botanica forces Rattrap and Nightscream to accompany her to the orchard when she senses it under attack. The Vehicons break through the Maximal defenses and the sparks attempt to help, but Megatron cuts off the Maximals' power boost through his own connection to the Oracle. Cheetor valiantly attempts to hold off Obsidian, Strika, and Thrust alone as his comrades fall, but to no avail. The Maximals' sparks are extracted as Optimus comes face to face with Megatron, now wearing his old "Optimal Optimus" body.
26	13	"Endgame Part III: Seeds of The Future"	William Lau	Robert N. Skir	November 18, 2000
Megatron gloats about his new body and his ultimate victory to Optimus, adding the other Maximals' sparks to the containment unit. Enraged, Optimus attacks, and their fight takes them across Cybertron's empty surface and underground areas. The sight of the destroyed techno-organic orchard and the Maximals' sparkless bodies gives Megatron enough time to capture Optimus and return him to the surface. Megatron begins absorbing the collected sparks and grows to tremendous size, before activating the Key to Vector Sigma and converting Cybertron's organic core into technomatter. As the sparks of the Maximals encourage him, Optimus unbalances Megatron and sends them plummeting into the core, completely destroying them and triggering a planetary reformatting. The other Maximals awaken on a fully techno-organic Cybertron, their bodies and minds restored; as Rattrap and Botanica happily reunite, and Silverbolt's original personality fully reasserts itself, Waspinator complains about his new tiny techno-organic body. The Oracle shows Cheetor a final vision of Optimus Primal's departed spark, and Cybertron's populace prepares to resume life on their newly-evolved homeworld.

== Home releases ==
Beast Machines: Transformers (Episodes # 1–5)

- Format: Color, DVD-Video, NTSC
- Language: English
- Region: Region 1 (U.S. and Canada only)
- Aspect Ratio: 1.33:1
- Audio: 2.0 Dolby Surround
- Number of discs: 1
- Rating: PG in Canada
- Studio: Anchor Bay Entertainment Canada
- DVD Release Date: August 10, 2004
- Run Time: 107 minutes

Canada / United States

Beast Machines: Transformers – The Complete Series

- Format: Box set, Color, DVD-Video, NTSC
- Language: English
- Region: Region 1 (U.S. and Canada only)
- Aspect Ratio: 1.33:1
- Audio: 5.1 Dolby Surround & 2.0 Stereo
- Number of discs: 4
- Rating: Not Rated
- Studio: Kid Rhino Entertainment
- DVD Release Date: February 28, 2006
- Run Time: 700 minutes

Canada / United States

Beast Machines – Transformers: Series 1

- Format: Dubbed, Full Screen, PAL
- Language English
- Region: Region 2
- Aspect Ratio: 1.33:1
- Audio: 5.1 Dolby Surround & 2.0 Stereo
- Number of discs: 2
- Classification: PG (Parental Guidance)
- Studio: Sony Pictures Home Entertainment
- DVD Release Date: 16 July 2007
- Run Time: 264 minutes

Beast Machines – Transformers: Series 2

- Format: Dubbed, Full Screen, PAL
- Language English
- Region: Region 2
- Aspect Ratio: 1.33:1
- Audio: 5.1 Dolby Surround & 2.0 Stereo
- Number of discs: 2
- Classification: PG (Parental Guidance)
- Studio: Sony Pictures Home Entertainment
- DVD Release Date: 19 November 2007
- Run Time: N/A

UK

Beast Machines – Transformers: Season 1 – Volumes 1 & 2

- DVD Release Date: 20 June 2007
- Audio: Dolby Digital 2.0 Stereo
- Aspect Ratio: 1.33:1
- Region: Region 4

Classification: PG (Parental Guidance)

Beast Machines – Transformers: Season 2 – Volumes 1 & 2

- DVD Release Date: 23 October 2007
- Audio: Dolby Digital 2.0 Stereo
- Aspect Ratio: 1.33:1
- Region: Region 4
- Classification: PG (Parental Guidance)

US / Canada Beast Machines: Transformers – The Complete Series

- Format: Box set, Color, DVD-Video, NTSC
- Language: English
- Region: Region 1 (U.S. and Canada only)
- Aspect Ratio: 1.33:1
- Audio: 5.1 Dolby Surround & 2.0 Stereo
- Number of discs: 4
- Rating: Not Rated
- Studio: Shout! Factory
- DVD Release Date: September 2, 2014
- Run Time: 690 minutes

== Other information ==
Written into a special edition comic book was a character by the name of Primal Prime. Appearing only in this book, he is a side character to the Beast Machines story and was later written into the toy lines of both Beast Machines and Transformers: Universe. In the Universe story line, he eventually gains a new body, which combined with Apelinq to create Sentinel Maximus.

The head writers used to post and answer questions on a message board known as Bottalk.

== Toys ==
The Hasbro toys for Beast Machines gained notoriety for bearing little resemblance to the show's characters, both in shape and color. Additionally, they were disproportionately scaled. The discrepancy arose because the show creators and toy creators developed the characters independently in the first year, leading to the release of slightly more show-accrue.

Many of the characters created as toys never made it on the television series, although some did appear in the comic books. Oddly, the transforming plant Botanica from the television series was not made into a toy for any of the related toy lines.

Another characteristic of this toy line was its packaging. Unlike other Transformers lines, wherein each toy had a photo or illustration of themselves on the front of the packaging, almost all Beast Machines packages had an illustration of Cheetor on the front – regardless of character or faction. The one exception was Nightscream.

The toys released in the Beast Wars Returns (a release of Beast Machines in Japan) toy line by Takara were recolored to more closely resemble the show colors. Molds from the drones in the Vehicon Army, which bore more resemblance to the Vehicon Generals, were recolored and used as the Vehicon Generals instead in the Beast Wars Returns toy line.

A line of simple McDonald's Beast Machines toys was sold which did look more like the show characters, and this line was recolored for release in other countries by other fast-food restaurants.

=== Non-show groups ===
A number of toy sub-groups didn't make it into the animated series, but had small stories on their toy boxes.

- Beast Riders

Two deluxe sized vehicles that resembled the heads of animals and could be ridden by larger figures. Both were redecorated once each, but their boxes remained unchanged.

- Deployers

Three sparkless Maximal drones transform into weapons for larger toys, with their boxes remaining unchanged despite being redecoed in new colors. The dark blue recolor of Rav represents the character Chro in the 3H Comic series, where the original-colored Deployers also appeared.

- Dinobots

A set of Maximals, all recolors of older toys from the Beast Wars and Beast Wars Neo lines, was commanded by Magmatron and T-Wrecks. Members included Airraptor and others, and like the Deployers, they appeared in the 3H Beast Machines comics.

=== Non-show characters ===
A number of characters appeared in the Beast Machines toy line who didn't make appearances in the television series. These included:

- Blastcharge – A Vehicon who turns into a six-wheeled missile truck. The character does appear in the Wreckers comics.
- Buzzsaw – A Maximal who transforms into a wasp. The character does appear in the Transformers: Universe comics.
- Battle Unicorn – A Maximal who turns into a unicorn.
- Che – A Beast Rider whose form is a cheetah head. The character was to appear in the un-produced Wreckers #4.
- Chro (Name given to purple Rav repaint) – Appears in Wreckers comics.
- Dillo – A Maximal Deployer who turns from an armadillo into a weapon. The character does appear in Wreckers comics.
- Geckobot – A Maximal who transforms into a flying lizard.
- Hammerstrike – A Maximal who transforms into a hammerhead shark.
- Longhorn – A Maximal who turns into a bull. The character was to appear in the un-produced Wreckers #4.
- Mechatron – A Beast Rider whose form is a dragon'a head.
- Mirage – A high speed Vehicon race car. The character appears in Apelinq's War Journals, his drones appear in Wreckers comics.
- Mol – A Maximal Deployer who turns from a mole into a weapon. The character did appear in Wreckers comics.
- Nightviper – A Maximal who transforms into a cobra.
- Primal Prime – A repaint of Beast Wars Optimal Optimus. The character does appear in the Wreckers comics.
- Quickstrike – A Maximal who transforms into a wolf. The character does appear in the Transformers: Universe comics.
- Rav – A Maximal Deployer who turns from a bird into a weapon. The character does appear in the Wreckers comics.
- Scavenger – A Vehicon Demolitions expert. The character does appear in the Wreckers comics.
- Skydive – A Maximal who turns a pterodactyl. The character was to appear in the un-produced Wreckers #4.
- Snarl – A Maximal who turns into a lion. The character does appear in the un-produced Wreckers #3, and the Transformers: Universe comics
- Spy Streak – A Vehicon stealth jet. The character does appear in the Wreckers comics.

== Transtech ==
After Beast Machines ended, Hasbro planned a follow-up series called Transtech, which would have been a combination of Beast Wars, Beast Machines, and G1. The series was supposed to bring back some of the characters who died in Beast Wars along with some characters from the original 1980s cartoon, all in new, organic-looking bodies, with vehicle alternate modes instead of the animals used in Beast Machines. Many concept sketches and even a few toy prototypes were made, but Hasbro scrapped the idea, bringing Car Robots to American markets as a placeholder until Transformers Armada.

Concept sketches or prototype toys have been seen for Blackarachnia, Cheetor, Depth Charge, Megatron, Nightscream, Optimus Prime, Scavenger, Shockwave, Soundwave, Starscream, and a new character called Immorticon.

== Transformers: Universe ==
The storyline of Beast Machines is continued in the short-lived comic book Transformers: Universe by 3H Publishing, which has stories taking place during the second season of Beast Machines (in the Transformers: Wreckers comic) and after the Beast Machines story (in the Transformers: Universe comic).
