= Venus Terzo =

Canadian actress

- Born: Venus Terzopoulos
- Occupation: Actress
- Years active: 1987–present
- Notable work: Beast Wars as Blackarachnia; Da Vinci's Inquest as Angela Kosmo; Ranma ½as Female Ranma Saotome; Gundam SEED Destiny as Talia Gladys; Vision of Escaflowne (Bandai Entertainment dub) as Millerna Aston; X-Men: Evolution as Jean Grey
- Spouse: José Charbonneau

Venus Terzopoulos is a Canadian actress who played Detective Angela Kosmo in Da Vinci's Inquest and its spinoff Da Vinci's City Hall. She was nominated in 2002 for the Gemini Award for Best Performance by an Actress in a Continuing Leading Dramatic Role in that same role. She also has voiced several roles in animated shows: Jean Grey in X-Men: Evolution, Blackarachnia in Beast Wars and Beast Machines, the female Ranma Saotome from Ranma ½, and the female Gintoki Sakata in Gintama°.

== Selected filmography ==
=== Film ===
- Hostage Negotiator - Skyscraper
- Marion Lane - Spectacular!
- Bonnie - Meltdown: Days of Destruction
- Barbarotious - Warriors of Virtue
- Spanish Woman's Daughter Ruby - Immediate Family
- Theresa Fernandez - Voyage of Terror
- Carla Browning - Painkiller Jane
- Susan Jennings - Circle of Friends
- Kathy - Echo
- Assistant - Born to Run
- Stacey - To Grandmother's House We Go
- Soap Opera Woman 1 - Laura Lansing Slept Here
- Sophie - American Boyfriends
- Isabelle Garcia - Behind the Camera: The Unauthorized Story of Mork and Mindy
- McKenzie - 12 Rounds 2: Reloaded
- Nettie - Murder She Baked: A Deadly Recipe
- Lani Tam - Hot Wheels World Race & Hot Wheels AcceleRacers

=== Television ===
- Valeria Crossley - Psych
- Angela Kosmo - Da Vinci's Inquest and Da Vinci's City Hall
- Monica Reynolds - Madison (4 episodes)
- Linda Pratt and Lena Graf - Viper episodes "People Like Us" and "On a Roll"
- Star and Sheila Brown - Mom P.I. episodes "The Shadows" and "Gumshoe"
- Melina Saris - Whistler episodes "The Burden of Truth" and "Scratching the Surface"
- Dr. Anna Rosoff and Spokeswoman - The Twilight Zone episode "The Pool Guy"
- Melinda and Elsie - 21 Jump Street episodes "Diplomas for Sale" and "Come from the Shadows"
- Valerie Sanducci - Street Legal, 14 episodes
- Joanna and Sonja - Supernatural episodes "Something Wicked" and "Love Hurts"
- Dr. Elisa Schwartz - Arrow, 13 episodes
- Dr. Francine Michaels - Stargate SG-1, Season 6, Episode 4, 2002
- Rita Gallo - The Murders, 8 episodes
- Other Women's Children (television movie; 1993)
- Andrea Jills - The L Word, season 5 episode 1
- Cyndi - It (1990)

=== Animation ===
- Barbie: Mermaidia - Azura, & Purple Merfairy
- The Barbie Diaries - Tia
- Barbie: Fairytopia - Azura
- Barbie: Fairytopia Magic of the Rainbow - Azura, and Pixie #1
- Death Note - Merrie Kenwood a.k.a. Wedy
- Beast Wars: Transformers - Blackarachnia
- Beast Machines: Transformers - Blackarachnia
- Boys Over Flowers - Minako Yamano
- ReBoot - Gigagirl and Copygirl
- Barbie of Swan Lake - Lila the Unicorn
- The Adventures of T-Rex - Ginger and Mae
- Captain N: The Game Master - Princess Lana and Medusa
- Cardcaptors - Samantha Taylor
- Fantastic Four: World's Greatest Heroes - Lucia von Bardas
- Gintama° - Gintoki Sakata (Genderbend Form)
- Gundam Seed Destiny - Talia Gladys
- Hamtaro - Charlotte Yoshi
- My Little Pony (G3) - Rainbow Dash and Sparkleworks
- The New Adventures of He-Man - Crita, Mara and Sorceress of Castle Grayskull
- Project A-Ko movies 2-6 - B-ko Daitokuji
- Ranma ½ - Ranma Saotome (female)
- Inuyasha the Movie: Affections Touching Across Time - Ruri
- Inuyasha: The Final Act - Spirit of Mount Azusa
- Saber Marionette J - Tiger
- Star Ocean EX - Celines Jules
- The Vision of Escaflowne (Bandai Entertainment dub) - Princess Millerna Aston
- X-Men: Evolution - Jean Grey
- Devil Kings - Venus
- Kong: The Animated Series - Amina
- MegaMan NT Warrior - Aki
- Magic Knight Rayearth - Luce
- Captain Zed and the Zee Zone - P.J.
- Action Man - Agent Diana Zurvis
- Heroes on Hot Wheels - Hannah, Julie Wood and Ruth Wong
- Skysurfer Strike Force - Lazerette and Myko
- King Arthur and the Knights of Justice - Lady Elaine
- The Adventures of Mowgli - Mother Wolf
- Sleeping Beauty - Misc
- Bucky O'Hare and the Toad Wars - Princess Katrina
- Darkstalkers - Mariko
- Project ARMS - Katsumi Akagi
- A Chinese Ghost Story: The Tsui Hark Animation - Siu Deep
- Master Keaton - Sophia
- G.I. Joe: Valor vs. Venom and G.I. Joe: Ninja Battles - Jinx
- Mobile Suit Gundam - Jacqueline Simone
- My Little Pony Tales - Dazzle and Patch
- Vor-Tech: Undercover Conversion Squad - Miranda Ortiz/Firefly
- Eat-Man '98 - Detective Amie
- Heaven's Fire - Michelle
- The SoulTaker - Olivia Carlisle
- Trouble Chocolate - Deborah and Mecha-Deborah
- Street Fighter - La Lupa
- Kishin Corps: Alien Defender Geo-Armor - Lt. Yoshiko Fujishima
- Human Crossing - Ryoko Wakabayashi
- Dokkoida?! - Marilyn Ranmoe
- The Little Prince - Marieke
- Pocket Dragon Adventures - Cuddles
- Stories From My Childhood, Goodtimes Fairy Tales, Littlest Pet Shop, The New Adventures of Kimba The White Lion, Funky Fables and Fat Dog Mendoza - Various Characters
- A Christmas Adventure ...From a Book Called Wisely's Tales - Dancer
- Mega Man - Female Patrons and Funworld Employee
- Heroes on Hot Wheels - Hanna, Ruth and Julie Woods
- Being Ian - Adam and Bernadette
- Tico of the Seven Seas - Cheryl Christina Melville
