= Predacon =

Predacon may refer to the following character factions in the Transformers franchise:

- Predacons, a Decepticon faction in the Transformers TV series
- Predacons, a faction in the Beast Wars franchise
