= List of Beast Wars episodes =

The episodes listed below are from the animated television series Beast Wars: Transformers. The series premiered on September 16, 1996 and ended on May 7, 1999, with a total of 52 episodes over the course of 3 seasons.

== Series overview ==
Season	Episodes	Originally released	
Season	Episodes	First released	Last released
1	26	September 16, 1996	April 1, 1997
2	13	October 26, 1997	March 13, 1998
3	13	October 25, 1998	May 7, 1999

== Episodes ==
=== Season 1 (1996–97) ===
No. overall	No. in season	Title	Directed by	Written by	Original release date	Prod. code
1	1	"Beast Wars, Part 1"	Ian Pearson	Bob Forward	September 16, 1996	01
On the planet Cybertron, a gang of Predacon criminals steal an ancient relic known as the Golden Disk and flee in a stolen warship, the Darksyde. The Maximal exploration vessel Axalon pursues the Predacons across space and time, emerging from a transwarp portal in an unknown star system. Both ships are heavily damaged in the subsequent space battle and crashland on a nearby world; the Axalon’s captain, Optimus Primal, ejects their cargo of stasis pods containing dormant Maximals into the planet's atmosphere before impact. The two crews scan organic alternate forms to protect themselves from overexposure to the planet's raw Energon deposits. As Optimus and the other Maximals Cheetor, Rhinox, and Rattrap admire their new beast modes (a gorilla, cheetah, rhinoceros, and rat, respectively), Velociraptor Predacon first officer Dinobot berates his Tyrannosaurus rex leader Megatron for crashing their ship on the wrong world. In response, Megatron blasts Dinobot away and orders the other Predacons to destroy the Maximals. The overeager Cheetor attracts the attention of the Predacons, which soon escalates into a major confrontation between both sides. The Maximals rescue Cheetor and return to the Axalon, where they find Dinobot on the other side of the rock bridge waiting for them, who challenges Optimus for leadership of the Maximals.
2	2	"Beast Wars, Part 2"	Steve Ball	Bob Forward	September 17, 1996	02
Optimus reluctantly accepts Dinobot's challenge despite the other Maximals' objections. Although both are impressed by the other's skill, the Predacons interrupt the duel and nearly blast them into a ravine. Rhinox saves Optimus and Dinobot while Megatron notices a huge Energon deposit inside a nearby mountain and calls the Predacons away. Optimus allows Dinobot to remain with the Maximals, disregarding Rattrap's reservations, and both sides reach the mountain's peak and attack in their beast modes. Megatron manages to injure Optimus, but Dinobot starts a chain reaction that destroys the mountain. As everyone escapes and watches the explosions, Optimus proclaims that the Maximals will continue battling the Predacons on this strange prehistoric world in the "Beast Wars."
3	3	"The Web"	C. Michael Easton	Larry DiTillio	September 18, 1996	06
Cheetor enthusiastically volunteers to test one of Rhinox's new long-range comlinks but is quickly distracted by the scorpion Predacon Scorponok attempting to retrieve one of the Darksyde’s mega-cannons. Cheetor surprises Scorponok, but he is ambushed by the mad tarantula Tarantulas, who heavily damages the young Maximal and buys Scorponok enough time to escape with the mega-cannon before Optimus arrives. Cheetor reawakens on the Axalon and is scolded for his reckless behavior; he sneaks out again to retrieve the mega-cannon but is once more ambushed by Tarantulas, who takes him to his underground lair. Tarantulas attempts to drain Cheetor's energy but is stopped by Rattrap, who destroys the lair and reluctantly covers for Cheetor's absence back on the Axalon.
4	4	"Equal Measures"	T. W. Peacocke	Greg Johnson	September 23, 1996	04
The Maximals attempt to set up a sensor system around their territory, but Optimus scrubs the mission when a powerful lightning storm approaches. Dinobot encourages Cheetor to outrun the storm and place the sensors, but the young Maximal is struck by lightning while planting the last sensor and is accidentally teleported into the Darksyde. The treacherous Pteranodon Terrorsaur attempts to capture Cheetor, but he is transported to the Axalon, while Scorponok and the jittery wasp Waspinator lose Cheetor in the ship's ventilation systems. Terrorsaur tries to ally with Dinobot, but he is quickly ejected from the Maximal base. Meanwhile, Cheetor is captured after discovering that a massive Energon vein runs under both ships, meaning that an explosion at either end would destroy all the Cybertronians. Not realizing this, Dinobot convinces Optimus to send a bomb to the Darksyde, and Megatron reluctantly releases Cheetor to disarm it. Cheetor manages to escape, destroying the remaining survey posts and severing the teleportation link.
5	5	"Chain of Command"	Andrew Doucette	Jesse Winfield	September 24, 1996	03
The Maximals and Predacons gather at an unnatural stone formation to claim an Energon cache, but Terrorsaur accidentally destroys the cache and activates a mysterious signal. Later, a probe of unknown origin emerges from transwarp space and lands at the stones; the Cybertronians again gather at the stones to claim the probe, but it seemingly disintegrates Optimus. The other Maximals squabble over leadership before receiving a signal from Optimus, who informs them he is trapped inside the probe and appoints Rattrap leader in his absence. Rhinox attempts to build a device capable of saving Optimus as the other Maximals confront the Predacons at the stones, but Waspinator accidentally reactivates the stones and releases Optimus. The probe then vanishes into transwarp space again, leaving the Maximals to wonder where it came from and who (or what) built it.
6	6	"Power Surge"	Nicholas Kendall	Larry DiTillio	September 25, 1996	08
Terrorsaur discovers a floating mountain rich with unstable red Energon, which supercharges his systems. As Cheetor watches, Terrorsaur returns to the Darksyde and challenges Megatron for leadership of the Predacons, easily destroying him. However, the red Energon's effects quickly wear off, and Tarantulas secretly follows Terrorsaur back to the mountain while Scorponok and Waspinator repair Megatron. Acting on Cheetor's information, Optimus and Rattrap destroy the mountain while fending off Terrorsaur and Tarantulas; defeated, the two Predacons return to base, where a repaired Megatron confronts Terrosaur.
7	7	"Fallen Comrades"	Steve Ball	Bob Forward	September 30, 1996	05
One of the orbiting Maximal stasis pods crashlands in the planet's icy northern wastelands. Bent on retrieving the pod first and reprogramming the blank protoform within into a new Predacon, Megatron incapacitates the flight-capable Optimus and forces the Maximals to head for the pod on foot. The other Predacons successfully block their path and reach the pod first, but Dinobot remotely starts the protoform's activation sequence from the Axalon. Upon discovering the empty pod, Megatron blackmails the Maximals by threatening two nearby white tigers, but one of them transforms into a Maximal and introduces himself as Tigatron, who helps the other Maximals defeat the Predacons, but the damage sustained during the crash makes him prefer his beast mode and the planet's natural wilderness. Tigatron agrees to support the Maximals in any way possible before departing with the second white tiger.
8	8	"Double Jeopardy"	Mark Schiemann	Jesse Winfield	October 7, 1996	07
While attempting to retrieve another fallen stasis pod, Optimus and Dinobot are ambushed by Terrorsaur and Waspinator and lose the pod, the latest in a series of failed missions. As Optimus accuses intelligence supplier Rattrap of treachery, Tarantulas reprograms the blank protoform into the black widow spider Predacon Blackarachnia. To prove his loyalty, Rattrap is sent on a dangerous scouting mission into Predacon territory, where he is ambushed by Terrorsaur and agrees to switch sides to save himself. With Rattrap's help, Terrorsaur deposes Megatron as Predacon leader and imprisons him, but the other Predacons also imprison Rattrap. The Maximals attack the Darksyde as Megatron and Rattrap independently escape; Rattrap destroys a Maximal codebreaker inside the Predacon communications system, while Megatron allows the bumbling Terrorsaur to lead the Predacon counterattack against the Maximals. Rattrap turns on Terrorsaur and escapes with Optimus, who informs the other Maximals that Rattrap's betrayal was merely a ploy for him to infiltrate the Darksyde and destroy the codebreaker.
9	9	"A Better Mousetrap"	J. Falconer	Karen Willson & Chris Weber	October 8, 1996	09
Rhinox finishes construction on an advanced defense program for the Axalon named Sentinel, but Rattrap and Dinobot's squabbling prematurely activates the system, forcing the Maximals to flee the base. Rattrap stays behind to deactivate Sentinel while Optimus and Tigatron find Waspinator acting strangely in Maximal airspace, but he disappears during the pursuit. Optimus returns to base as Tigatron continues following Waspinator's scent, discovering a cave underneath the Axalon where Blackarachnia and Terrorsaur are trying to use a sonic bomb to destroy the Maximal base. Tigatron foils their sabotage while Rattrap evades Sentinel's defenses, eventually arriving at its control unit. Although Sentinel nearly kills Rattrap, he deactivates the rogue system and retakes control of their base.
10	10	"Gorilla Warfare"	James Boshier	Greg Johnson	October 14, 1996	11
While examining flowers on a reconnaissance mission, Optimus and Dinobot are ambushed by Scorponok, who infects Optimus with one of his cyber-bee drones. Dinobot informs the other Maximals that the cyber-bee reprograms its victims into cowards and will explode if removed. However, Optimus instead becomes a crazed berserker whose increased aggression is rapidly draining his Energon reserves. As the Maximals discuss how best to retrieve the cyber-bee's antidote from Scorponok, Optimus attacks the Darksyde alone and singlehandedly tears his way through the Predacons until reaching Scorponok's laboratory, where Megatron has the antidote. Megatron attempts to trade Optimus' loyalty for the antidote, but Optimus tears the drone off and is cured by the other Maximals as the drone explodes inside the Predacon base. Optimus awakens to find Dinobot at his bedside, who leaves him one of the flowers from their earlier mission.
11	11	"The Probe"	Ezekiel Norton	Craig Miller & Marv Wolfman	October 15, 1996	10
On Cybertron, the Maximal Elders dispatch a fleet of temporal probes to scour time and space for the missing Axalon. One of the probes successfully finds the mystery planet on which the Maximals and Predacons are stranded but moves out of communication range before a signal can be sent. However, Rhinox informs the group the probe will pass by the planet again before returning to Cybertron, so the Maximals hurry to build a signal array powerful enough to make contact. Dinobot confesses he is not excited to return to Cybertron, where Predacons are treated as second-class citizens under Maximal rule. Meanwhile, Tigatron and Cheetor fall victim to Tarantulas' latest invention, a transformation lock lens that traps them in beast mode, and they are captured. Cheetor accidentally informs Megatron about the probe and signal array, and the Predacons storm the site and trap the other Maximals in beast mode. Tigatron and Cheetor repair themselves on the Darksyde and arrive in time to save their comrades, but Megatron destroys the array and gloats that the Beast Wars will continue until the Predacons win. The despondent Maximals can only watch as the probe disappears into transwarp space.
12	12	"Victory"	Steve Ball	Wendy Reardon	November 1, 1996	13
The Maximals activate a spy camera inside Scorponok's laboratory just in time to watch the Predacons revolt against Megatron and accidentally vaporize themselves by detonating an Energon crystal. Shocked, they infiltrate the Darksyde only to confirm that no trace of the Predacons remain, and they strip the ship of enough parts to repair the Axalon. Dinobot decides to stay on the mystery planet, fearing he will be executed on Cybertron as a Predacon criminal. However, he soon discovers the rest of the Predacons hiding in a crevasse. As the Axalon prepares for liftoff, Optimus and Cheetor leave the ship to help Dinobot escape, but Scorponok blasts Optimus away from reentering the departing vessel. Megatron boards the Axalon and dispatches most of the Maximals but is ejected from the ship by Rhinox; however, his tail weapon destroys the controls and sends the ship crashing to the ground. Optimus manages to slow the Axalon’s descent with his jetpack and safely returns the ship to its original position, but Rhinox reports it will never fly again.
13	13	"Dark Designs"	Owen Hurley	Ian Weir	November 4, 1996	12
Rhinox singlehandedly foils a Predacon ambush inside a canyon with his intelligent tactics, brute strength, and heavy weaponry. Impressed, Megatron orders Tarantulas to kidnap Rhinox and use him as the test subject for his latest invention, a "Transmuter" that forcibly reprograms Rhinox into a Predacon. Although the other Maximals immediately call for an assault on the Predacon base, Optimus decides to wait since Rhinox's new aggressive and devious personality drives him to threaten, brutalize, and dispatch the other Predacons until only Megatron remains. As Rhinox gloats about his victory, Megatron lures him onto the Transmuter and reverts him to his standard programming, at which point the other Maximals breach the Darksyde and retrieve him.
14	14	"Double Dinobot"	John Pozer	Rowby Goren	November 5, 1996	14
Megatron and Scorponok bring to life a non-transforming clone of Dinobot as part of their latest plan to destroy the Maximals. Terrorsaur lures the real Dinobot into a cave and collapses the roof, while the clone attempts to convince Optimus to investigate a false Predacon sighting and abandon the Maximal base. The clone kicks Rattrap off a cliff into a lava river and finally gets Optimus to leave the base and rescue him. As the clone repeatedly tries and fails to bypass Sentinel's security, Optimus and Cheetor save Rattrap as the real Dinobot digs himself out of the cave and returns to the Maximal base. He discovers and attacks the clone but agrees to fight it in beast mode upon discovering it cannot transform. Megatron approaches the Axalon only to be met by the real Dinobot, who reactivates Sentinel and blasts the Predacon leader away. Dinobot explains the situation to the other Maximals once they return and reveals he ate the clone after killing it.
15	15	"The Spark"	Colin Davies	Larry DiTillio	November 11, 1996	15
Another orbiting stasis pod is clipped by a piece of debris and crashlands in Predacon territory. Rhinox and Cheetor arrive first, only to discover that the damage sustained to the pod and the high levels of Energon radiation threatens to extinguish the protoform and its spark – the Cybertronian equivalent of a soul. Cheetor agrees to donate some of his components to help Rhinox stabilize the protoform and engages Blackarachnia, Waspinator, and Terrorsaur to buy him as much time as possible. Rhinox saves the protoform but absorbs too much Energon radiation and collapses, while Terrorsaur takes down Cheetor. Just as Terrorsaur attempts to claim the pod, the protoform comes online as the flight-capable falcon Maximal Airazor, who easily bests Terrorsaur in aerial combat. Airazor returns to the Maximal base with Rhinox and Cheetor and is happily accepted into the team.
16	16	"The Trigger, Part 1"	J. Falconer	Bob Forward	November 18, 1996	16
While reporting to the Axalon, Tigatron is ambushed and knocked off a mountain by Terrorsaur and Waspinator. The Maximal falls into a strangely fast cloud and vanishes, and the two Predacons follow him as Optimus arrives at the battleground. Although the Maximals conclude that Tigatron has been destroyed, Airazor witnesses a badly-damaged Terrorsaur and Waspinator limping back to the Darksyde. They inform Megatron that the "cloud" is a flying island armed with a massive energy weapon, and Tigatron has taken refuge within the island's ecosystem. Megatron sends Blackarachnia and Scorponok to secure the island, and Airazor is shot down by the weapon while following them. The three Cybertronians quickly discover that the island is populated with traps and hidden defenses. At the same time, Tigatron commandeers one of Scorponok's cyber-bee drones to warn the Maximals about the island's power.
17	17	"The Trigger, Part 2"	Michaela Zabranska	Bob Forward	November 19, 1996	17
Tigatron decides to remain on the flying island as its guardian, saving the injured Airazor from another trap while the Predacons move closer to the central obelisk. Optimus, Rattrap, Terrorsaur, and Waspinator crashland on the island and rendezvous with their respective allies. Rattrap theorizes that the island's creators intended it to be a survival test for whichever intelligent species encountered it. With the obelisk weapon on cooldown, Blackarachnia breaches the structure and takes control of the island's power; Scorponok attempts to stop her but is ejected from the island by another trap. The other Maximals scramble to evacuate the Axalon as Tigatron regretfully destroys the obelisk to stop Blackarachnia, obliterating the entire island and its natural splendor. The fallen obelisk sends a signal into transwarp space, leaving the Maximals to wonder how the island's creators will react to its destruction.
18	18	"Spider's Game"	James Boshier	Larry DiTillio	January 6, 1997	20
Tarantulas deactivates the Maximal and Predacon sensors to claim another fallen stasis pod for himself but is forced to bring Blackarachnia along. The two spiders successfully reprogram the protoform into a Predacon but are unable to change its beast form into another spider. The insane fire ant Inferno is thus created, but his damaged programming convinces him that he is an actual ant, and he attacks everyone in sight for approaching the "colony" (his stasis pod). With Blackarachnia and Airazor unwittingly distracting Inferno, Tarantulas steals the stasis pod and escapes. Upon discovering the disappearance of the "colony," Inferno flies into a rage and pursues Tarantulas, but Tigatron destroys the pod first. He is nearly killed by the combined firepower of Inferno, Tarantulas, and Megatron, but the three Predacons are driven back by Airazor and the other Maximals. Inferno is repaired and pledges his fanatical devotion to "the Royalty" (Megatron), while Blackarachnia questions Tarantulas about why he wanted the pod specifically. He accidentally informs her that the planet is doomed and meant to convert the pod into an escape shuttle but refuses to tell her anything else.
19	19	"Call of the Wild"	Jonathan Goodwill	Bob Forward	January 7, 1997	21
The Predacons mount a full-scale assault on the Axalon, distracting the Maximals long enough for Waspinator and Terrorsaur to steal the rectifier coil from the ship's external shield generator. Without the coil, the base is no longer protected from Energon radiation, and the Maximals are forced to stay in beast mode at all times, which Megatron predicts will cause their bestial instincts to overwhelm their internal programming. The Maximals succumb to their primal tendencies and flee into the wilderness, and Megatron organizes the other Predacons into a traditional hunting party to destroy them. A freshly repaired Airazor sneaks into the unoccupied Predacon base to retake the rectifier coil while Tigatron, already at one with his beast mode, rounds up the other Maximals and helps them restore the balance between their organic and technological bodies. With their minds restored, the Maximals use their robot and beast modes to defeat the Predacons.
20	20	"Dark Voyage"	Steve Ball	Samuel Warren Joseph	January 27, 1997	18
Cheetor, Rattrap, Dinobot, and Rhinox are ambushed by Waspinator and Scorponok, who detonates the Energon deposit the Maximals are mining. The two Predacons return to base, unaware that their enemies are still alive but heavily damaged and completely blind. Rhinox takes command of his panicking teammates and begins guiding them back to the Axalon before the Energon poisoning kills them. As the four blind Maximals fend off a large snake and attempt to cross a waterfall, Waspinator returns and sends them over the falls. Left with no other options, the Maximals use Rhinox's keen senses to fend off Waspinator and Terrorsaur. They are saved when Tigatron and Optimus arrive and return them to the Axalon for repairs.
21	21	"Possession"	Owen Hurley	Ian Weir	February 3, 1997	19
During a violent storm that damages both the Axalon and the Darksyde, Waspinator is suddenly possessed by the ghost of the ancient Decepticon Starscream. Starscream claims to the shocked Predacons that his immortal spark was unbound from space and time when his body was destroyed by the dark god Unicron and pledges himself to Megatron. Intrigued, Megatron allows Starscream to lead an attack on the Axalon, and he successfully drives the Maximals from their base. As the Maximals plan a response, Blackarachnia privately reveals to Starscream that she knows he was really destroyed when his commander Galvatron murdered him for his betrayal. Nevertheless, she agrees to help Starscream destabilize both factions, and they capture Optimus and Dinobot after they request access to their base's repair center. However, the two Maximals use the opportunity to arm themselves and retake the Axalon. Optimus defeats Starscream in aerial combat, and Blackarachnia betrays the Decepticon, freeing Waspinator and sending Starscream's immortal spark back into the depths of space and time.
22	22	"The Low Road"	J. Falconer	Bob Forward	February 10, 1997	22
As the Maximals attempt to prune an infestation of wild bean vines around their base, Tarantulas infects Rhinox with an Energon discharge virus that forces the Maximal to sneeze his Energon reserves dry. To save Rhinox, Rattrap and Dinobot are sent to find Tarantulas and obtain the antidote. Despite their constant bickering, they dispatch Tarantulas and discover his underground laboratory, although the Predacons have already claimed the antidote. Dinobot attempts to use the unconscious Tarantulas as a hostage, but Rattrap sneaks past the Predacons and steals the antidote. The other Maximals arrive to find the situation resolved until Rhinox, who had been eating the wild beans to calm his stomach, releases a massive Energon-infused fart that sends the Predacons flying.
23	23	"Law of the Jungle"	John Pozer	Mark Leiren-Young	February 17, 1997	23
Cheetor and Dinobot are ambushed on patrol by Inferno, Terrorsaur, and Waspinator. During the battle, Tigatron arrives to support them and accidentally detonates a Predacon explosives depot, killing his tiger companion Snowstalker in a rockslide. Distraught over losing his friend, Tigatron buries her body and quits the Maximals and the Beast Wars, to his comrades' shock. As the three Predacons regroup, Dinobot and Optimus individually approach Tigatron as to why he should not abandon the fight, but he refuses to listen. Later, Inferno's team ambushes Dinobot again and heavily damages Optimus, but Tigatron changes his mind and returns to save them.
24	24	"Before the Storm"	Adam Wood	Bob Forward	February 21, 1997	24
Tigatron and Megatron both observe a mountain emitting a strange energy pulse of alien origin; Inferno is sent to investigate and retrieves a second Golden Disk inscribed with alien runes. The next day, Optimus receives a transmission from Megatron, who requests a truce between the Maximals and the Predacons. Although Optimus is skeptical, the two leaders meet, and Megatron affirms his genuine desire for a truce, stating that he no longer has time to worry about the Maximals. The other Maximals conclude his hesitancy is connected to the alien energy pulse and send Rattrap and Airazor to distract Megatron while Tigatron infiltrates the Predacon database. Although he successfully downloads the necessary information, he is caught by Terrorsaur before he can escape; the two factions hold a weaponless battle at both Optimus and Megatron's insistence, and the Maximals defeat the Predacons through a variety of primitive traps and tricks. Back at the Axalon, Tigatron informs the others of his shocking discovery – the mysterious aliens who seeded the planet with Energon and constructed the stone formation, probe, and flying island are on their way...and they are not happy.
25	25	"Other Voices, Part 1"	Colin Davies	Larry DiTillio & Bob Forward	March 31, 1997	25
A flash of energy emerging from transwarp space alerts Rhinox that the aliens have arrived. As Optimus, Rattrap, and Airazor rendezvous at the landing site, Tarantulas dispatches Waspinator and steals one of the Darksyde’s transwarp cells. Blackarachnia offers to help obtain another stasis pod from the Axalon as the aliens capture Airazor for study. Megatron and Scorponok meet Optimus and Rattrap outside the alien structure and help them rescue Airazor, though Optimus is captured in her place. Inferno follows Tarantulas and Blackarachnia as they sneak aboard the Axalon while the aliens personally address Optimus. Using the visage of Unicron's head, they inform Optimus that the warring Cybertronians have contaminated their experiments and will be accordingly sterilized along with the rest of the planet. As Optimus breaks free and Rattrap and Airazor overpower the Predacons, the dome explodes with a beam of energy that activates one of the planet's two moons and knocks the remaining stasis pods out of orbit. Tarantulas and Blackarachnia ambush Rhinox and Dinobot inside the Axalon and watch in horror as the moon's surface burns away to reveal an enormous doomsday weapon.
26	26	"Other Voices, Part 2"	Ezekiel Norton	Larry DiTillio	April 1, 1997	26
The alien weapon finishes charging as Megatron and the other Predacons watch Tarantulas and Blackarachnia convert the transwarp cell and the stasis pod into an escape ship, but Inferno arrives and dispatches them both. Blackarachnia recovers and knocks him out, then scans the unconscious Tarantulas's mind for the necessary information to complete the ship. As the other Maximals rescue Rhinox and Dinobot and discover Blackarachnia inside the hold, the Planet Buster fires a giant heat ray to ignite the Energon deposits and destroy the planet. Optimus orders Blackarachnia to surrender the ship's control codes, planning to destroy the Planet Buster by flying the ship into orbit and detonating the transwarp cell inside the machine. She reluctantly complies, but Optimus realizes too late that the pod's ejection sequence has been disabled. Megatron calls the doomed Optimus and gleefully informs him he added his own special programming to the transwarp cell, unbeknownst to Tarantulas. The other Maximals can only watch in horror as the transwarp cell explodes, obliterating the Planet Buster, the escape ship, and (apparently) Optimus.

=== Season 2 (1997–98) ===
No. overall	No. in season	Title	Directed by	Written by	Original release date	Prod. code
27	1	"Aftermath"	Colin Davies	Larry DiTillio	October 26, 1997	27
Optimus' apparent death is met with grief from the Maximals and delight from the Predacons, but a quantum surge created by the Planet Buster's destruction hits the planet at full force and begins affecting several of the Cybertronians. Cheetor, Rattrap, Megatron, Tarantulas's unconscious body, Scorponok, and Terrorsaur take the brunt of the surge's effects, but the latter two fall into the lava pits beneath the Darksyde and are swiftly killed. The remaining three awaken only to discover that they have been upgraded into new Transmetal forms; Rattrap's rat mode now possesses supercharged wheels, while Cheetor and Megatron can fly in their upgraded beast modes. Megatron attacks the leaderless Maximals and squares off against Rattrap and Cheetor, while Tarantulas psychically forces Blackarachnia to take his unconscious Transmetalized body with her as she flees the Axalon. Megatron retreats as two stasis pods activate elsewhere on the planet, their DNA scanners experiencing severe malfunctions.
28	2	"Coming of the Fuzors, Part 1"	Steve Sacks	Bob Forward	November 2, 1997	28
Megatron and Inferno leave to claim the two malfunctioning stasis pods while Waspinator regards the planet's remaining moon. Dinobot breaks into the Predacon base to steal the two Golden Disks and confronts Waspinator, who has made the same realization: the mystery planet they are stranded on is, in fact, prehistoric Earth, and the two Disks contain information about the future. Blackarachnia returns and reluctantly revives Tarantulas as Dinobot dispatches Waspinator and escapes. The Maximals discover a stasis pod with a Transmetalized blank protoform as the malfunctioning pods give birth to two mutant Cybertronians: a wolf-eagle hybrid named Silverbolt and a scorpion-snake hybrid named Quickstrike. Megatron inducts the two Fuzors into the Predacons as Dinobot decides not to destroy the two Disks, hiding the original and secretly keeping the alien one. Rhinox utilizes the Axalon’s equipment to project his core consciousness into a temporal rift created by the Planet Buster's destruction as the Predacons prepare for a full-scale assault on the Maximal base. Since any disturbance to the ship would instantly kill Rhinox, Rattrap, Cheetor, and Dinobot have no choice but to hold the line against six fully armed Predacons.
29	3	"Coming of the Fuzors, Part 2"	Cal Shumiatcher	Bob Forward	November 9, 1997	29
As the battle commences, Silverbolt repeatedly questions Megatron's ruthless strategy and is harshly reprimanded for his words. Waspinator and Silverbolt fly ahead to the Maximal base, with Cheetor in hot pursuit and closely followed by Rattrap and Dinobot. Tarantulas attempts to mentally force Blackarachnia to search Megatron's databanks for information on the Golden Disks, but she trashes the computer instead. Sentinel shoots down the approaching Silverbolt, who surrenders to the Maximals and is taken inside for repairs. Rhinox returns and joins his crewmates, but the Axalon’s shields fail and the Maximals run out of ammunition. The Predacons close in on their defeated foes but are suddenly stopped by the surprise return of Optimus Primal. Rhinox had retrieved Optimus' spark from the afterlife and transferred it into the blank protoform. With his new flight mode and increased firepower, Optimus defeats the Predacons, and Silverbolt kicks Megatron off a cliff and is accepted into the Maximals. Back at the Darksyde, Megatron rages at the recent string of failures while Blackarachnia mulls over the information she secretly downloaded from Megatron's computer.
30	4	"Tangled Web"	Craig McEwen	Len Wein	November 16, 1997	30
Megatron instructs Waspinator and Inferno to construct a jamming tower to disrupt Maximal communications and orders Tarantulas, Blackarachnia, and Quickstrike to convert a recently discovered supply of stabilized Energon into a refueling station. Tarantulas secretly broadcasts their location to the Maximals and attracts the attention of Rattrap and Silverbolt; once the Predacons arrive at the cave, though, Tarantulas decides to construct a new lair inside and attempts to sway Blackarachnia and Quickstrike to his side. Desperate to be free of his psychic influence, Blackarachnia nearly detonates an Energon cube and forces Tarantulas to sever the link; Rattrap and Silverbolt attack the cave, but the latter chivalrously refuses to strike the female Blackarachnia. The cave entrance explodes, and both parties assume it was destroyed and retreat to their respective bases. However, Tarantulas merely collapsed the entrance to claim the cave and its Energon supply for himself.
31	5	"Maximal, No More"	Trenton Carlson	Patrick Barry	November 23, 1997	31
Noting that the Predacon installations correspond in shape and relative position to the runes on the original Golden Disk, Dinobot begins to suspect that Megatron is playing a much larger game than previously anticipated. He, Rattrap, and Silverbolt are later ambushed by Inferno, Quickstrike, and Waspinator, and Dinobot is captured and taken to the Darksyde. However, he surprises all the Predacons by requesting to rejoin their faction, concluding that Megatron's victory is inevitable. Skeptical, Megatron orders Dinobot to prove his loyalty by defeating Quickstrike in single combat and returning the original Golden Disk, which he reluctantly does. However, Dinobot cannot pass Megatron's final test to kill the imprisoned Rattrap and instead drives him away. As Optimus and Silverbolt arrive, Dinobot confesses his betrayal and allows Rattrap to decide his fate, who reluctantly lets him remain with the Maximals.
32	6	"Other Visits, Part 1"	John Pozer	Larry DiTillio	February 8, 1998	32
Rhinox and Dinobot discover another pattern between the runes on the alien Golden Disk and the various alien installations the Maximals and Predacons have encountered on prehistoric Earth. The next such alien structure coincides with Tigatron and Airazor's scout patrol, but they are unable to warn them thanks to the Predacon jamming stations. As Tarantulas and the other Predacons detect the alien presence, Tigatron and Airazor are captured and abducted after professing their love for each other. Cheetor arrives too late to save them, closely followed by the other Maximals, but Megatron, Inferno, and Blackarachnia attack the understaffed Axalon and steal the alien Golden Disk from Rhinox. The Maximals return to base and agree that stopping Megatron is their priority, while Tarantulas secedes from the Predacons but offers to help stop the aliens. The Predacons and Maximals confront each other at the abduction site, but an alien ship materializes before them and disables everyone with an Energon surge.
33	7	"Other Visits, Part 2"	Colin Davies	Larry DiTillio	February 15, 1998	33
The Transmetalized Cybertronians quickly recover from the alien weapon's attack, and Tarantulas activates a force field around it, locking the Maximals outside. As Cheetor and Silverbolt return Rhinox and Dinobot to the Axalon for repairs, Megatron accesses the weapon using the alien Golden Disk and takes control of its systems. Using its considerable power, Megatron retrieves the other Predacons, betrays Tarantulas, and captures Optimus; Rattrap avoids detection and reluctantly accepts Tarantulas' help in retaking the weapon. As the other Predacons begin transferring the Darksyde’s remaining transwarp cells to the alien weapon, Megatron informs Optimus that he will use the alien weapon to conquer Cybertron. The Maximals attack the alien weapon to give Rattrap and Tarantulas just long enough to sneak aboard, free Optimus, and activate a self-destruct mechanism. Everyone flees as the alien machine explodes harmlessly in space, and the Maximals resolve to save Tigatron and Airazor if possible.
34	8	"Bad Spark"	Steve Sacks & Jonathan Goodwill	Greg Johnson	February 22, 1998	34
While on patrol, Cheetor finds a massive stasis pod with a large yellow "X," alarming the other Maximals and attracting the interest of the Predacons. Optimus and Silverbolt arrive to find the protoform inside dead, to the former's relief; when questioned, Optimus informs them that the Axalon’s real mission was to dispose of Protoform X, an insane, sociopathic serial killer created while attempting to replicate Starscream's immortal spark. Blackarachnia and Waspinator attempt to claim the pod, but a violent Energon storm scatters everyone across the jungle; Blackarachnia and Silverbolt agree to work together and escape, while Protoform X reactivates and tears Tarantulas limb from limb. As Blackarachnia develops romantic feelings for Silverbolt, Protoform X attacks them with his giant crab and tank alternate modes but is defeated with Optimus' help. Silverbolt heroically saves Blackarachnia, and Megatron steals a piece of the dazed Protoform X's spark to control him, forcibly inducting him into the Predacons and renaming him Rampage.
35	9	"Code of Hero"	Bob Forward	Ian Weir	March 9, 1998	35
Still haunted by his shameful betrayal of the Maximals, Dinobot contemplates suicide as Rhinox reports that the quantum surge from the Planet Buster's destruction will reach present-day Cybertron soon. Dinobot resolves to mitigate his past misdeeds and captures Tarantulas, who reveals that Megatron keeps the original Golden Disk on him. Megatron and Rampage, meanwhile, conduct an experiment using the Disk's historical records and realize that the future can be changed. With this information, the Predacons lay siege to the valley from which the human race is destined to emerge, planning to erase humanity from existence and alter the outcome of the Great War between the Autobots and Decepticons. Dinobot has no choice but to defend the valley alone and singlehandedly defeats Tarantulas, Blackarachnia, Inferno, Waspinator, Rampage, and Quickstrike, sustaining mortal injuries in the process. Dinobot uses the last of his strength to destroy the Golden Disk before collapsing, and Megatron is forced to retreat as the other Maximals arrive. Surrounded by his friends and safe knowing that humanity's future is assured, Dinobot succumbs to his wounds and dies.
36	10	"Transmutate"	J. Falconer, Sean Osborne & George Samilski	Christy Marx	March 10, 1998	36
The Maximals' attempt to destroy another Predacon jamming station is foiled by a powerful earthquake, which reveals a buried and damaged stasis pod. A fight ensues over the pod, which explodes to reveal a misshapen, skeletal Cybertronian named Transmutate. Struck by an odd sense of kinship with the creature, Rampage befriends it, and Megatron reluctantly gives it a chance to destroy the Maximals, even though it cannot transform. Rampage and Inferno ambush Silverbolt, but Transmutate refuses to kill the Maximal and knocks Inferno away with a powerful sonic scream. Silverbolt brings Transmutate to the Axalon and is angered by the other Maximals' decision to put the mentally damaged creature in stasis, while Rampage lures Transmutate outside again. Rampage and Silverbolt battle for Transmutate's allegiance, but it sacrifices itself to protect its two friends. As Rampage collapses with grief over Transmutate's death, Silverbolt advises Optimus and Cheetor to leave him be.
37	11	"The Agenda, Part 1"	Cal Shumiatcher	Bob Forward	March 11, 1998	37
The Planet Buster's quantum surge finally reaches Cybertron; the Tripredacus Council prevents the Maximal Elders from detecting it and sends a secret agent to track its source and eliminate Megatron. With his time and options running out, Megatron implements one last risky plan as Silverbolt and Blackarachnia secretly meet to exchange components and a kiss. The other Predacons commence a full-scale assault on the Maximal base but are soon driven away by an invisible attacker, who boards the Axalon and introduces himself as Ravage, a former Decepticon working with the Tripredacus Council to arrest Megatron. Waspinator is sent on a secret mission as Blackarachnia follows him in a homemade hovercraft, and the Maximals accompany Ravage as he breaks into the Darksyde and captures Megatron.
38	12	"The Agenda, Part 2"	Owen Hurley	Bob Forward	March 12, 1998	38
With Megatron imprisoned and the Predacons scattered, Optimus reprimands Silverbolt for his infatuation with Blackarachnia and sends Cheetor to arrest her; however, Silverbolt knocks Cheetor out and flees. On Ravage's ship, Megatron attempts to trade his freedom for a secret supply of Energon cubes, but Ravage has already learned of the supply from Tarantulas, a mole for the Predacon Secret Police. Optimus and Cheetor attempt to retrieve the Energon supply but are ambushed by Inferno, who detonates the Energon and vaporizes himself. Silverbolt catches up to Blackarachnia by a mountain and saves her when her hovercraft crashes into Waspinator. Although slightly irritated by his goofy chivalrous demeanor, Blackarachnia allows him to stay, and requests help digging into the mountainside. Megatron informs Ravage that he traveled to prehistoric Earth at the command of the original Megatron, the leader of the Decepticons and Ravage's old commander. He uses the last shard of the Golden Disk to play a fragment of the original Megatron's message, instructing any Decepticon descendants to travel back in time to prehistoric Earth using transwarp technology. Optimus and Cheetor return to the Axalon, only to find that Ravage has switched sides and released Megatron.
39	13	"The Agenda, Part 3"	Asaph Fipke & Colin Davies	Bob Forward	March 13, 1998	39
The Predacon assault on the Maximal base renews with Ravage's support, and its shields quickly fail; Rampage accidentally runs over Quickstrike while Rattrap sneaks aboard Ravage's ship and destroys it, Tarantulas, and the former Decepticon. The ship's final missile takes out Rampage, but Megatron strangely flees in a different direction than the Predacon base. Blackarachnia and Silverbolt dig into a cave system inside the mountain and discover the Ark, a crashed Cybertronian ship containing the offline bodies of the greatest Autobot and Decepticon warriors who will reawaken and renew the Great War on Earth in four million years. Megatron arrives, seals the cave's entrance, and shoots Silverbolt, forcing Blackarachnia to give up the Ark’s access codes to save him. The Maximals arrive and frantically start digging as Megatron enters the Ark and finds the body of Optimus Prime, the legendary Supreme Commander of the Autobots. With one final grandiose speech glorifying the Decepticons and Predacons, Megatron kills Optimus Prime and creates a temporal storm that erases the Maximals from existence.

=== Season 3 (1998–99) ===
No. overall	No. in season	Title	Directed by	Written by	Original release date	Prod. code
40	1	"Optimal Situation"	Steve Sacks	Bob Forward	October 25, 1998	40
As the Maximals fade out of existence, Blackarachnia activates the Ark’s computer Teletraan-1 and the ship's defense systems to save herself, blasting Megatron away. She and Silverbolt connect Optimus Prime to a life-support system, but the repair trauma still threatens to extinguish his spark. Optimus Primal takes Optimus Prime's spark into his own body to allow Rhinox enough time to heal the Autobot leader, but the power of two sparks mutates the Maximal commander into a gigantic new form. Megatron reenters the Ark to attack again but quickly flees upon seeing the new "Optimal Optimus," shooting Blackarachnia on his way to the unprotected Axalon. Optimus and Cheetor catch him but are too late to stop Rampage and an army of Tarantulas' small spider drones from dragging the Maximal base off its perch and into the lake below. The repairs on Optimus Prime's body are completed, and Optimus Primal returns his ancestor's spark to its rightful place. Blackarachnia provisionally joins the Maximals and helps salvage their former base to fortify the Ark against any further Predacon attacks.
41	2	"Deep Metal"	Owen Hurley	Larry DiTillio	November 1, 1998	41
Back in the present day, a mysterious Maximal hunting Protoform X is suddenly sucked into a transwarp portal, Transmetalized, and crashlands on prehistoric Earth. Rampage notes the new Maximal's arrival and abandons a planned ambush at the Ark, while the new Maximal scans a manta ray for his beast mode and continues searching for Protoform X. Cheetor arrives at the crash site but is knocked into the water by Rampage; the new Maximal saves him and introduces himself as Depth Charge before leaving Cheetor stranded on an island. Rampage ambushes Depth Charge underwater, but their fight ends with the two giant Transmetals unconscious on the beach. The two continue battling, but Quickstrike distracts Depth Charge long enough for Rampage to escape. Optimus Primal and Cheetor return the new arrival to the Ark, where Optimus informs the others that Depth Charge was the lone survivor of one of Protoform X's mass killings. Depth Charge successfully captured Protoform X after many years of searching but could not convince the Maximal Elders to execute him, leaving him jaded and resentful against Optimus for agreeing to dispose of him non-lethally. Depth Charge awakens and, despite recognizing the Beast Wars' temporal significance, contemptuously leaves to hunt Rampage alone as the Predacon destroys his crashed ship.
42	3	"Changing of the Guard"	Steve Sacks	Evan Somers	November 8, 1998	42
Since Rhinox cannot connect Maximal technology with Teletraan-1's forcefield to protect the base, Optimus forces Rattrap to salvage Sentinel from the Axalon’s wreckage using a submarine crafted by Blackarachnia. Rattrap successfully retrieves Sentinel but is caught by Rampage; he is saved by Depth Charge, who agrees to keep Rampage occupied long enough for Silverbolt to extract Rattrap. Waspinator ambushes the two Maximals and steals Sentinel, but Depth Charge refuses to help them retrieve it. Although Rattrap and Silverbolt nearly manage to retrieve Sentinel from Inferno, a repentant Depth Charge inadvertently ruins the mission and allows the Predacons to escape. Back at the Ark, a furious Optimus berates Depth Charge for costing the Maximals a major strategic advantage. He reluctantly agrees to join the team to prevent further miscommunications as the Predacons install Sentinel into the Darksyde.
43	4	"Cutting Edge"	Trenton Carlson	Ian Weir	November 15, 1998	43
An anthropoid village is suddenly attacked by a group of Predacon cyber raptors as part of Megatron's attempts to advance Transmetal technology further. Rattrap notices Blackarchnia stealing parts from the classified area of the base as Cheetor develops an infatuation with her, drawing Silverbolt's ire. Cheetor and Blackarachnia are assigned to escort two young anthropoids back to the village but are attacked by more cyber raptors and lose contact with the other Maximals. As the Predacons send more troops to ambush the stranded Cheetor and Blackarachnia, the two Maximals bond while working together to destroy the raptors and safely return the anthropoid children to their village. Despite this, Blackarachnia reaffirms her love for Silverbolt and spurns Cheetor's advances, while Megatron realizes he can perfect the Transmetal technology by combining the raptors' technology with the other half of Rampage's spark.
44	5	"Feral Scream, Part 1"	John Pozer	Greg Johnson	January 31, 1999	44
One dark and stormy night, Megatron and Waspinator steal a stasis pod containing a blank protoform from Optimus and Cheetor. Using the protoform, Rampage's half-spark, cells from Dinobot, and a mysterious Transmetal driver of alien origin, Megatron brings another clone of Dinobot, designated Dinobot II, to life. Depth Charge and Cheetor arrive and steal the Transmetal driver, but Megatron knocks Cheetor into the cloning machine, which overloads and seemingly destroys the young Maximal. The others mourn Cheetor's death while Blackarachnia secretly saves the Transmetal driver after Depth Charge throws it into lava; the giant Maximal is later ambushed by Dinobot II and the Predacons while on patrol but is saved by a strange feral monster. Optimus and Rhinox later find Cheetor alive outside the Maximal base.
45	6	"Feral Scream, Part 2"	Steve Sacks	Jules Dennis	February 7, 1999	45
Since returning to the Maximals, Cheetor has been acting strangely; he refuses to use the repair chambers, grows a strange green appendage in his sleep, and suffers from nightmares of the other Maximals tormenting him. When Rattrap attempts to check on the sleeping Cheetor, he is attacked by the same feral monster that saved Depth Charge. Although Rattrap assumes the monster has eaten Cheetor, Megatron realizes that the monster is Cheetor, whose contact with the experiment upgraded him to a feral Transmetal II form. He sends Waspinator and Dinobot II to capture him as the Maximals come to the same conclusion. Cheetor awakens in a strange cave in his normal Transmetal body and returns to base, but a Predacon attack causes the Transmetal II beast to reemerge. Optimus helps Cheetor reassert control and master his new body, and Blackarachnia resolves to upgrade herself into a Transmetal II body.
46	7	"Proving Grounds"	William Lau	Arthur Sellers	February 14, 1999	46
Blackarachnia undergoes a medical test to find the location of Tarantulas' Predacon shell programming but leaves the Maximal base in a huff after feeling derided by her teammates. Dinobot II ambushes her, but he angrily retreats after she refuses to duel him. As Silverbolt tries searching for Blackarachnia, she reencounters Dinobot II and agrees to fight, but Blackarachnia cannot call for backup. Silverbolt arrives, but Blackarachnia convinces Dinobot II to continue their duel, giving Silverbot enough time to trick the Predacon clone and shoot him off a cliff. Blackarachnia attempts to leave the Maximals, but Optimus and the others arrive and convince her that the choice to remove the shell program is hers, convincing her to stay.
47	8	"Go With the Flow"	Cal Shumiatcher	Bob Forward	February 18, 1999	47
Tarantulas' latest invention is a bi-polar disruptor cannon capable of destroying Maximals and Predacons while sparing Autobots and Decepticons, but Inferno prematurely activates the weapon before its completion. Megatron is unable to approach it without being killed and sends Waspinator to kidnap one of the anthropoid children, named Una, to finish the weapon instead. Una is brought to the Predacons, and Megatron uses the cannon on the approaching Rattrap and Depth Charge, damaging all the Predacons and blowing the two Maximals out of the sky. Rattrap leaves the damaged Depth Charge behind as Una somehow completes the cannon despite barely comprehending Tarantulas and Megatron's instructions. Rattrap arrives to save her as Una secretly steals the cannon's stabilizing crystal. The two reunite with Depth Charge and sail into the sunset as the now-unstable cannon explodes.
48	9	"Crossing the Rubicon"	Trenton Carlson	D. C. Fontana	February 22, 1999	48
Blackarachnia attempts to convert herself into a Transmetal II with the alien driver, but Silverbolt inadvertently ruins the experiment. After Rhinox informs her that her Predacon shell program is degrading and threatens to extinguish her core consciousness, Blackarachnia agrees to have it removed and transfers the Ark’s access codes to Optimus. Tarantulas detects the intrusion and leads a squadron of Predacons to attack the base, disrupting Rhinox long enough for Blackarachnia to die on the operating table. An absolutely livid Silverbolt attacks Tarantulas and nearly executes the unconscious mad scientist, but Rampage ambushes him. He is saved by Blackarachnia, who was revived and upgraded into a Transmetal II by the Transmetal driver, and she finally accepts herself as a Maximal.
49	10	"Master Blaster"	Steve Sacks	Eric Torin	March 15, 1999	49
With Waspinator acting as a distraction, Tarantulas infects Optimus with a small drone that burrows into his nervous system and hijacks control of his body. Using a control harness linked to the drone, Quickstrike uses Optimus' body to dispatch all of the Maximals and allow Megatron access to the Ark once more. Instead of attacking Optimus Prime again, though, Megatron decides to absorb the spark of the original Megatron in hopes of replicating the power boost that mutated Optimus into his "Optimal Optimus" form. Once he does so, however, Quickstrike drops Megatron into a lava pit on Tarantulas' orders, who plans to destroy the Ark and wipe out Autobots, Decepticons, Maximals, and Predacons alike. However, Megatron emerges from the lava, reborn as a monstrous red dragon, and incinerates Tarantulas while Blackarachnia uses telekinesis to escape from Rampage and help free Optimus from Quickstrike's control. As Optimus and Megatron battle, Blackarachnia stops the Ark’s self-destruct sequence, frees the other Maximals, and helps them drive Megatron away, who still holds the original Megatron's spark.
50	11	"Other Victories"	William Lau	Larry DiTillio	May 5, 1999	50
The Predacons place Quickstrike on trial for betraying and attempting to assassinate Megatron, but the event is disrupted by the return of the aliens. Their defenses against the latest alien anomaly are ineffective, so the Predacons evacuate as the Darksyde is destroyed. A horrified Optimus brings Cheetor to the crash site, fearing that the original Megatron's spark was also destroyed. Once there, they find a massive winged Cybertronian who introduces himself as Tigerhawk, emissary of the aliens and the fusion of Tigatron and Airazor's deactivated bodies. Tigerhawk and his masters, known only as the Vok, mean to eliminate Megatron for meddling with the time stream, but the alien creation is attacked and incapacitated by Tarantulas. An unconscious Cheetor dreams of meeting Tigatron and Airazor's disembodied sparks, which fuse, and he awakens to find the fused spark leading him to Tarantulas' lair. There, he overhears Tarantulas explain his grand plan to an imprisoned Tigerhawk: using the emissary's immense power, the Autobots, Decepticons, Maximals, and Predacons will be wiped from existence in one fell swoop, and he and the Tripredacus Council will be unaffected by the resulting temporal storm due to having "other origins." However, Tarantulas accidentally exorcises the two Vok inhabiting Tigerhawk and detonates an Energon crystal, killing himself and the aliens. The fused spark of Tigatron and Airazor retakes control of Tigerhawk, who agrees to join the Maximals.
51	12	"Nemesis, Part 1"	Ezekiel Norton	Bob Forward	May 6, 1999	51
Now vulnerable without a base, Inferno leads Waspinator and Quickstrike to search for a new "colony" as Megatron, Rampage, and Dinobot II search the remains of Tarantulas' lair for anything useful. Dinobot II discovers a tunnel leading to an intricate underwater railway system, and the three Predacons depart as the Maximals pick up their trail. Inferno and Quickstrike plan to conquer an anthropoid settlement as their new base, but Waspinator finally tires of the continual abuse suffered during the Beast Wars and quits the Predacons. Silverbolt is injured by a bomb left behind on the tunnel's hatch and is returned to base for repairs as Optimus and Depth Charge discover Tarantulas' final gambit: the Nemesis, a legendary Decepticon warship that shot the Ark down and crashed on Earth alongside it. Depth Charge follows the rail system as Optimus sounds the alarm, but it is too late, as Megatron and Dinobot II arrive at the crashed Nemesis to find that Tarantulas repaired and refurbished the vessel. Rampage ambushes Depth Charge on the ocean floor outside the warship as Optimus and Tigerhawk fly to their coordinates. During the battle, Depth Charge stabs Rampage with an Energon crystal and detonates it in a fit of rage, killing them both. Although the two Maximals mourn Depth Charge's sacrifice, their grief quickly turns to horror as the fully operational Nemesis rises from the ocean.
52	13	"Nemesis, Part 2"	Cal Shumiatcher & Steve Sacks	Simon Furman	May 7, 1999	52
Megatron directs the firepower of the Nemesis across the prehistoric landscape in a maddened random attack, and Tigerhawk sacrifices himself to buy the Maximals more time to prepare. Megatron destroys the anthropoid settlement, killing Inferno and Quickstrike in the process, while the Maximals frantically try to reactivate the Ark to fight the Nemesis head-on. The warship arrives above the mountain and attempts to destroy the Ark with a tractor beam, and Optimus boards the ship to battle Megatron one last time. The Ark’s engines fail to come online and the other Maximals accept their deaths, but Dinobot II unexpectedly informs them of a detachable Autobot shuttle stored within the Ark. Having regained some vestiges of the original Dinobot's personality after the destruction of Rampage's spark, Dinobot II distracts Megatron just long enough for Rhinox to crash the Autobot shuttle through the warship's bridge and eject him. Dinobot II bids farewell to the Maximals as the Nemesis crashes elsewhere on the planet. Optimus returns the original Megatron's spark to his body (although this scene was cut from the episode), and the surviving Maximals modify the Autobot shuttle with a transwarp cell. With Megatron restrained on the shuttle's hull, Optimus, Cheetor, Rattrap, Rhinox, Silverbolt, and Blackarachnia depart prehistoric Earth for Cybertron. The Beast Wars come to an end as the surviving anthropoids elect Waspinator as their new leader, who declares that he is finally happy.
