= Beast Wars: Transformers =

Animated television series

- Genre: Action; Adventure; Science fiction; Superhero
- Based on: Transformers by Hasbro
- Developed by: Larry DiTillio; Bob Forward
- Voices of: Garry Chalk; David Kaye; Scott McNeil; Ian James Corlett; Richard Newman; Alec Willows
- Opening theme: "Beast Wars Theme Song"
- Composer: Robert Buckley
- Countries of origin: Canada; United States; Japan
- Original language: English
- No. of seasons: 3
- No. of episodes: 52 (list of episodes)

Production
- Executive producers: Christopher Brough; Ian Pearson; Stephane Reichel; Steven DeNure; For Alliance/Alliance Atlantis; Beth Stevenson; Peter Sander; Suzanne French; For YTV; Laurinda Shaver; Alan Gregg
- Producers: Jonathan Goodwill; Kim Dent Wilder; Mark Ralston
- Running time: 22–23 minutes
- Production companies: Alliance Communications (seasons 1–2); Alliance Atlantis Communications (season 3); Mainframe Entertainment; BLT Productions Ltd.; Claster Television Incorporated

Original release
- Network: Syndication; YTV; TXN (TV Tokyo)
- Release: September 16, 1996 – May 7, 1999

Related
- The Transformers; Beast Machines: Transformers; Beast Wars II; Beast Wars Neo

Beast Wars: Transformers (titled Beasties: Transformers in Canada) is an animated television series that debuted on September 16, 1996 and ended on May 7, 1999, serving as the flagship of the Transformers: Beast Wars franchise. It was one of the earliest fully CGI television shows. The series is set in the future of the "original" Transformers franchise, 300 years after the events of The Transformers, and features the Maximals and Predacons, descendants of the Autobots and Decepticons respectively. While engaged in battle, small teams from each faction crash land on an unknown planet, and must find a way to return home while continuing their war.

The Beast Wars TV series was the first Transformers series to feature computer-animated characters, and was produced by Mainframe Entertainment of Vancouver, British Columbia; its story editors were Bob Forward and Larry DiTillio. The production designer for the show, Clyde Klotz, won a Daytime Emmy Award for Outstanding Individual Achievement in Animation in 1997 for his work on Beast Wars.

A sequel television series, Beast Machines: Transformers, aired from 1999 to 2000. Additional Beast Wars limited comic book series have been released by Dreamwave Productions and IDW Publishing.

== Premise ==
The two main factions of "Transformers" in Beast Wars are descendants of the two main factions in the original cartoon: the Maximals are the descendants of the Autobots and the Predacons are the descendants of the Decepticons. (In the sequel series Beast Machines, the process during which Autobots and Decepticons became Maximals and Predacons is referred to as "The Great Upgrade".)

The leader of the Predacon team is Megatron, a namesake of the original Decepticon commander. He and his forces are a splinter group on the hunt for powerful crystals known as energon. They do this with the aid of an artifact known as the Golden Disk and Megatron's stolen ship, the Darksyde, which is equipped with a transwarp drive. A Maximal exploration ship, the Axalon, led by Optimus Primal, is sent to stop them. Together the ships plunge through a spacetime phenomenon created by the transwarp device during their battle in space, and crash-land on a mysterious planet.

The planet is found to be rich in deposits of raw energon, in such extreme amounts that it proves to be poisonous to both factions' robot forms, forcing them to take on alternate organic forms for protection until their robot forms are needed. Thus the robots take on the beast forms of recognizable animals including mammals, birds, fish, reptiles, amphibians, dinosaurs, and invertebrates.

Before crashing, the Axalon deploys its cargo of "stasis pods" containing Maximal protoforms — Transformer robots with vulnerable and undeveloped physical forms, which are left to orbit the planet as an alternative to possible destruction in the initial crash landing. This plays a larger part in the IDW series, The Gathering. Throughout the series, stasis pods lose altitude and crash-land on the planet, and the Maximals and Predacons race and fight to acquire them, as protoforms acquired by Megatron's forces can be reprogrammed to become Predacons. The stasis pods are used as a plot device to introduce new characters.

The teams are divided between the "good" Maximals and the "evil" Predacons, equivalent to the traditional Autobots and Decepticons. Most of the Maximals are based on mammals, birds or fish, while the Predacons are based on arthropods and dinosaurs. Dinobot changes sides, starting as a Predacon and becoming a Maximal, and was later recreated as an artificial Predacon clone by Megatron in season 3. Additionally certain "Predacons" like Inferno and Blackarachnia were created from Maximal protoforms, but were fitted with Predacon shell programs, fighting instead for the Predacons. For the Maximals, the emphasis is on team spirit and good-natured arguing, especially from Rattrap, but the Predacons argue and battle for leadership, which impairs their effectiveness against the Maximals.

== Voice cast ==
- Garry Chalk as Optimus Primal and G1 Megatron
- David Kaye as Megatron
- Scott McNeil as Rattrap, Dinobot, Waspinator, Silverbolt and Dinobot II
- Ian James Corlett as Cheetor and Sentinel
- Richard Newman as Rhinox and the Vok
- Alec Willows as Tarantulas
- Doug Parker as Terrorsaur and Starscream
- Don Brown as Scorponok
- Venus Terzo as Blackarachnia
- Blu Mankuma as Tigatron, Tigerhawk, the Vok and Unicron
- Pauline Newstone as Airazor
- Jim Byrnes as Inferno
- Colin Murdock as Quickstrike
- David Sobolov as Depth Charge
- Campbell Lane as Rampage
- Elizabeth Carol Savenkoff as the Darksyde (Predacon) computer system
- Lee Tockar as Ravage
- Susan Blu as Transmutate

== Episodes ==
Season	Episodes	Originally released	
Season	Episodes	First released	Last released
1	26	September 16, 1996	April 1, 1997
2	13	October 26, 1997	March 13, 1998
3	13	October 25, 1998	May 7, 1999

== Video games ==
There have been two Beast Wars video games. The first game, Beast Wars: Transformers, was released for the PlayStation and PC. It is a third-person shooter, based on the first season of the show, in which players control either the Maximals or the Predacons in a series of missions to undermine the other faction's attempts at gaining enough resources to win the war between them and escape the planet. The PC conversion added a multiplayer feature that allowed up to 8 players to play over LAN, with its own playrooms in the MS Gaming Zone. The playrooms were shut down in 2006.

The second game, Beast Wars Transmetals, is a fighting game based on the second season released for the PlayStation and Nintendo 64 by BAM! Entertainment. Most of the cast-members from the show reprised their voice-roles.

A third game was in the works for the PlayStation 2, but was scrapped in pre-production, without any official word as to why, or how far the project was before the plug was pulled.

== Home media ==
The series was originally released on DVD in Region 1 by Kid Rhino Entertainment (under its Rhinomation classic animation entertainment brand) in 2003/2004.

On February 8, 2011, Shout! Factory announced that they had acquired the rights to the series and planned to rerelease it. They rereleased season 1 on DVD on June 7, 2011 as well as a complete series set on the same day. Both releases contain extensive bonus features including interviews, featurettes and special 24 page comic book, "Transformers Timelines: Dawn of Future's Past." Season 2 & 3 were rereleased on October 4, 2011.

In Region 4, Madman Entertainment released all three seasons on DVD, in its original PAL format in Australia in 2006. On June 24, 2009, they released Transformers: Beast Wars – Complete Collection. The 10-disc box-set features all 52 episodes of the series as well as many bonus features.

DVD Name	Episodes	Release dates	
DVD Name	Episodes	Region 1	Region 4
Season 1	26	August 12, 2003; June 7, 2011 (Rerelease)	March 17, 2006
Season 2	13	March 23, 2004	July 25, 2006
Season 3	13	March 23, 2004	November 10, 2006
Seasons 2 & 3	26	October 4, 2011 (Rerelease)	N/A
Complete Series	52	June 7, 2011	June 24, 2009

== Reception ==
Beast Wars won a Daytime Emmy Award for Outstanding Individual Achievement in Animation in 1997.

In a 2011 retrospective of the Transformers franchise, IGN commented that while Beast Wars used the same basic story template as previous series in the franchise, it "featured some of the best writing and story development in a Transformers series". Reviewing the season 2 DVD release, DVD Talk similarly remarked that Beast Wars used the same basic story as the 1984 Transformers series, but stood out from other series of its time by delivering messages to children without becoming preachy and utilizing considerable continuity, both from episode-to-episode and eventually with the 1984 Transformers series. The reviewer said the animation was dated by modern standards but the interesting and fun story content outweighed it. In a review of the season 3 DVD, the same critic praised the season's more rapid pace and darker tone, and said it was arguably the best season of the series. He concluded, "Beast Wars may have been a marketing tool for Hasbro, but it also told some good stories without pandering to the lowest common denominator."

== Legacy ==
The show was succeeded by Beast Machines: Transformers, with a new creative team in charge of production. The traditionally animated Japanese series Beast Wars II and Beast Wars Neo were created to fill the gap while the second and third seasons of Beast Wars were being translated into Japanese (called Beast Wars: Metals). Several comic books and video games were also produced. The show's production companies, Mainframe Entertainment and Alliance Atlantis, are also the same creators of the world's first ever computer-animated TV series, ReBoot, which ran from 1994 to 2001.

In June 2017, producer Lorenzo di Bonaventura stated that a film adaptation of Beast Wars was not in plans, as he explained: "I'm probably not the one to be asking that question to because I don't get Beast Wars, but you know, thankfully I'm not the only vote on it. I've never quite understood, they kind of feel like incompatible to me, you have animals, robots, we're used to cars." Both a follow-up to Bumblebee, and an adaptation of Beast Wars were reported to be in development, written separately by Joby Harold and James Vanderbilt, respectively. It was later reworked as a hybrid adaptation named Transformers: Rise of the Beasts, which is a sequel to Bumblebee and featured the Maximals and a new incarnation of the Terrorcons. The film was released on June 9, 2023.

The third and final chapter of Transformers: War for Cybertron Trilogy titled "Kingdom" features the Autobots and the Maximals teaming up against the Decepticons and the Predacons.
