= Dinobot (Beast Wars) =

Beast Wars character

- Transformers: Beast Wars character
- Dinobot in Beast Wars: Transformers
- Voiced by: Scott McNeil, Krizz Kaliko

In-universe information
- Affiliation: Maximal (former Predacon)

Dinobot is a fictional robot character from Beast Wars in the Transformers franchise. Within the franchise, he defects from the villainous Predacon faction to the heroic Maximals, ultimately sacrificing his life to save the world. He can transform into a Velociraptor.

== History ==
In 1996, the Transformers franchise was rebooted as Transformers: Beast Wars. This franchise features a new cast of Transformers that transform into animals rather than vehicles. One of the characters, Dinobot, can transform into a Velociraptor. His original toy included a mutant mask that was planned for the cartoon but was ultimately cut.

Dinobot first appears in the animated series Beast Wars: Transformers. In the series, he serves as the second-in-command to the villainous Megatron, (Note: The character named Megatron in the Beast Wars franchise is not the same character as Megatron in the original Transformers series.) the leader of the Predacons, but tries to usurp control from him. After failing to defeat Megatron, he challenges Optimus Primal to try to gain control of the heroic Maximals. When Optimus Primal saves Dinobot's life, Dinobot agrees to join the Maximals to defeat Megatron. In the episode "Code of Hero", Dinobot has to steal an artefact called the Golden Disk from Megatron and destroy it to save the timeline. He fights against every Predacon, ultimately defeating Megatron, sacrificing his life in the process. In the show, Dinobot is voiced by Scott McNeil.

Dinobot returns in the War for Cybertron Trilogy. In this series, he single-handedly battles Soundwave, Ravage, Laserbeak, G1 Megatron, and Beast Wars Megatron in order to retrieve the Matrix of Leadership. (Note: The Matrix of Leadership is a mystical Autobot artefact that, according to Ron Friedman, is "the cybernetic, philosophical, physical and mystical core of Autobot leadership itself – the godhead".) Like in Beast Wars, he is killed in the fight, sacrificing himself for the greater good. He is voiced in this series by Krizz Kaliko. Dinobot was not featured in the film Transformers: Rise of the Beasts. This omission caused controversy among some fans.

== Reception ==
Dinobot is positively received by fans of the Transformers franchise. Within the Transformers fandom, Dinobot is sometimes jokingly nicknamed "Raptor Jesus" because he sacrificed his life to save the world.

IGN listed Dinobot as the 13th best Transformer in the franchise, saying that he is "perhaps the single most memorable character from the Beast Wars animated series". At the 2010 BotCon, Dinobot was one of five Transformers characters inducted into the "Transformers Hall of Fame". Dinobot was named the 3rd best upgrade in Beast Wars history in a 2013 publication by Topless Robot.
