= Transformers: Beast Wars =

Media franchise

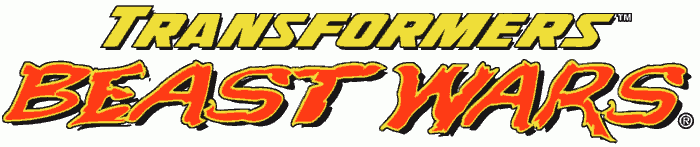
- Created by: Hasbro

Transformers: Beast Wars is an entertainment franchise created by Hasbro. The franchise is part of the larger Transformers world. It directly follows the Transformers: Generation 1 continuity, established by the 1984 series and animated film. It ignores the continuity established by the Japanese Transformers series, though this franchise has two exclusive Japanese series of its own. Before Beast Wars, Hasbro attempted to relaunch the original toys and animation as Transformers: Generation 2. Hasbro intended another franchise titled Transtech to follow, which would have combined Beast Wars and Generation 1 characters and aesthetics, but this was canceled. Instead, the franchise began a series of reboots, beginning with the Japanese-produced Transformers: Car Robot series, internationally known as Transformers: Robots in Disguise.

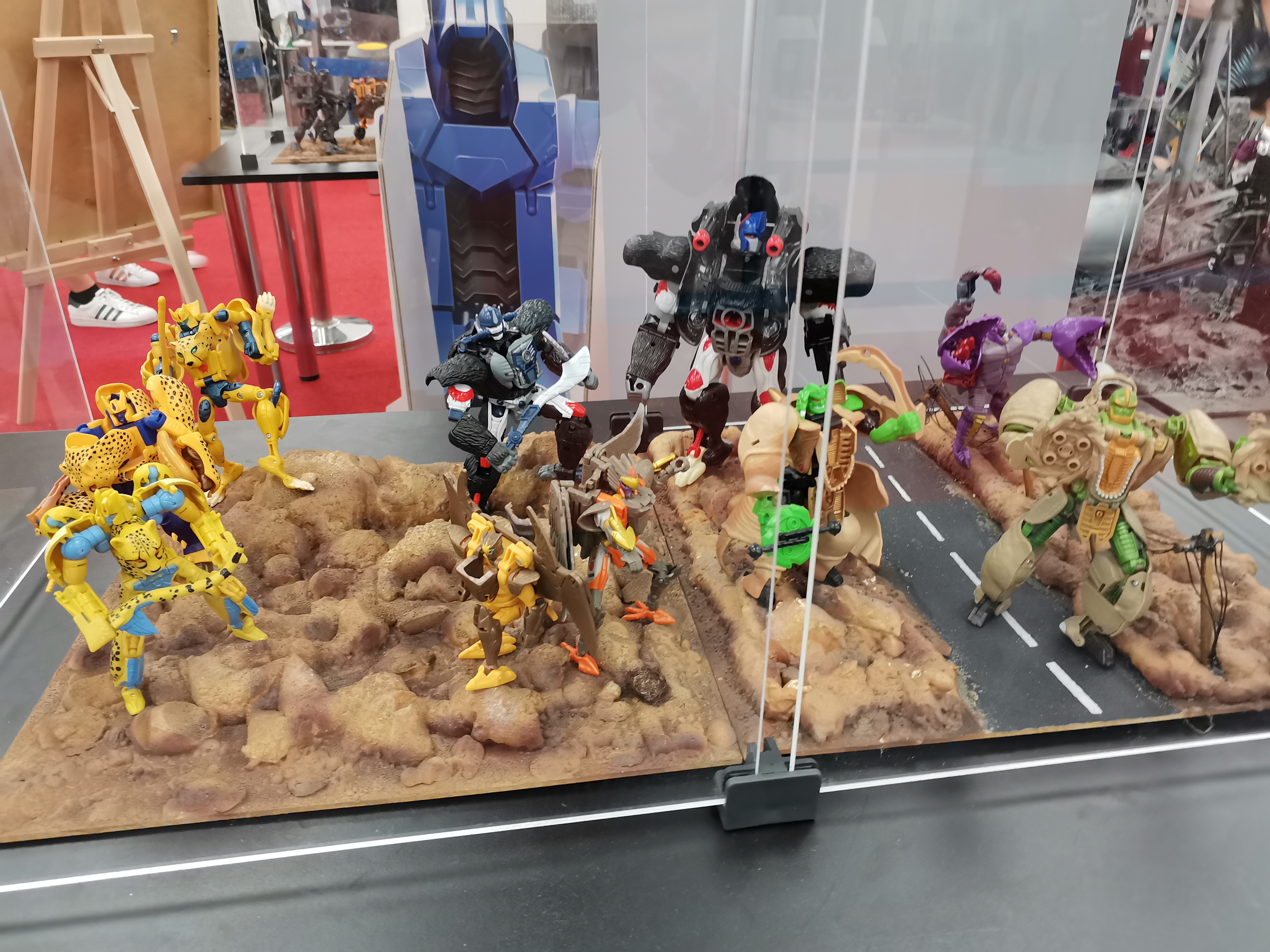
Beast Wars action figures at Pyrkon 2023 in Poznań.

== Television series ==
=== Beast Wars ===
Beast Wars follows the battle between two warring factions, the Maximals and the Predacons, for raw "energon" scattered across a mysterious planet while searching for a way home. At the end of the second season they discover the Autobot ship that fled Cybertron with the Autobots and Decepticons from the original series, and have to protect them to stop from being erased from existence.

=== Beast Machines ===
Beast Wars was succeeded by Beast Machines, a new series with a new creative team in charge of production. The Maximals find themselves back on Cybertron, malfunctioning and trapped in their beast modes from the beginning of Beast Wars, without any memory of what happened previously. Optimus Primal, Cheetor, Rattrap, and Blackarachnia begin a new crusade, this time to free the entire planet from the Vehicons, created and controlled by Megatron.

=== Beast Wars in Japan ===
The Japanese series Beast Wars II and Beast Wars Neo were created to fill the gap while the second and third seasons of Beast Wars were being translated into Japanese (called Beast Wars: Metals). The characters originate from the future that the Beast Wars teams left, but the events of the series take place in the far future. The series saw the return of Unicron. Unlike the original Beast Wars series, Beast Wars II and Beast Wars Neo used traditional animation and were aimed at a much younger audience. Beast Wars II spawned a theatrical movie. The Beast Wars Neo toyline was created to cater to the Japanese market, whereas the cybernetic transmetal Beast Wars Transformers sold well in Western markets. Japanese fans preferred more realistic-looking beast modes; thus, Beast Wars: Metals was not as successful with Japanese fans. The second and third seasons of Beast Wars and its toyline only lasted a few months before being replaced by Transformers: Car Robots in the following new year, in which several unused Transmetal 2 molds were used as Destrongers (Predacons). Beast Machines was also imported to Japan in 2004 under the title Beast Wars Returns, though it did not gain much popularity.

== Comic books ==
Officially, the Beast Wars and Beast Machines series exist as the future of Transformers: Generation 1 universe, and not specifically of the original cartoon series or Marvel Comics series. The writers of the series adopted this position in order to pick and choose the best elements of the discrete Generation 1 continuities.

=== BotCon comics ===
In the BotCon comics, two particular Beast Wars storylines are tapped.

In the Omega Point storyline, several events lead up to a tremendous battle against Shokaract, a Predacon fueled by the Dark Essence of Unicron himself. This also serves as an introduction to Apelinq and features the only appearances of Windrazor, Sandstorm, Antagony, and Cataclysm.

In the Primeval Dawn story, Tarantulas returns from the dead alongside Ravage, Spittor, Iguanus, and Razorclaw to complete the mission he set out to do. Meanwhile, the Vok create Primal Prime, who teams up with Airazor, Tigatron, and Ramulus as an opposing team that has also returned from the dead as well.

=== Dreamwave Productions ===
Dreamwave Productions released a Summer Special which contained a Beast Wars story. It introduced three new characters, Optimus Minor, Bonecrusher, and Wolfang. The comic had a survey asking whether Dreamwave's new comic would be Robots in Disguise or Beast Wars. Beast Wars won the vote.

Dreamwave Productions had plans to release a Beast Wars comic in early 2005, which would have been done by the War Within creative team of Simon Furman and Don Figueroa. Brad Mick and Adam Patyk were originally planned to write the series until they left Dreamwave after not being paid for several projects. However, Dreamwave entered bankruptcy before one issue could be published, although some cover art did appear on the internet.

=== IDW Publishing ===
A mini-series takes place parallel to the third season of Beast Wars and introduces characters who are not shown in the original series such as Magmatron, Razorbeast, and Injector. Other characters who appear include Grimlock in his Beast Wars body (a recolored Dinobot toy) and Ravage in his Transmetal II "Tripredacus Agent" incarnation.

The mini-series focuses on Magmatron, sent by the Tripredacus Council to capture Megatron after Ravage's failure. However, Magmatron has his own agenda: to create his own army from the stasis pods the Axalon ejected in the pilot episode of Beast Wars. His scheme is partially thwarted by the Maximal double-agent Razorbeast, who ensures the shell program used reconfigures many of the protoforms as Maximals rather than Predacons. The two sides clash in an attempt to stop Magmatron from returning to Cybertron with a captured Megatron, with some unexpected aid from Grimlock ensuring Magmatron is sent back to Cybertron empty handed. However, Razorbeast's Maximals and many Predacons (led by Ravage, resurrected in a Transmetal II body) are left on Earth, opening the way for future series.

== Media ==
=== Video games ===
There have been two Beast Wars video games. The first game, simply called Beast Wars, was released for PlayStation and PC. It is a third-person shooter, based on the first season of the show, in which players control either the Maximals or the Predacons in a series of missions to undermine the other faction's attempts at gaining enough resources to win the war between them and escape the planet. It was given a multiplayer feature (removed from the console releases) that allowed up to 8 players to play over LAN, with its own play rooms in the MS Gaming Zone (they have since been removed). The second game, Transformers: Beast Wars Transmetals, is a fighting game based on the second season. The PlayStation version was released by Hasbro Interactive and the Nintendo 64 version was released by BAM! Entertainment. Most of the cast members from the show reprised their roles. A third game was in the works for the PlayStation 2, but was scrapped in pre-production, without any official word as to why, or how far the project was before the plug was pulled. Beast Wars characters appear in several mobile games such as Transformers: Battle Tactics, Transformers: Earth Wars, and Transformers: Forged to Fight.

- Beast Wars: Transformers
- Transformers: Beast Wars Transmetals
- Kettō Transformers Beast Wars: Beast Senshi Saikyō Ketteisen
- Transformers: Battle Tactics
- Transformers: Earth Wars
- Transformers: Forged to Fight

=== Television series ===
- Beast Wars: Transformers

- List of Beast Wars episodes

- Beast Machines: Transformers

- List of Beast Machines episodes

- Beast Wars II

- Beast Wars II: Lio Convoy, Close Call!
- List of Beast Wars II characters

- Beast Wars Neo

- List of Beast Wars Neo characters

- Beast Wars Sourcebook

== Film ==
In March 2019, producer Lorenzo di Bonaventura announced ongoing developments for a follow-up to Bumblebee. By January 2020, it was officially announced that a sequel to Bumblebee was in development with a script written by Joby Harold, alongside an adaptation of Transformers: Beast Wars with a script written by James Vanderbilt. The film was then scheduled for release on June 24, 2022, while in November, Steven Caple Jr. was hired to serve as director on the project, which serves as both a Bumblebee sequel and Beast Wars adaptation. In April 2021, Anthony Ramos was cast in one of the lead roles for the film, with Dominique Fishback in final talks to play the lead role. The project was a joint-venture production between Hasbro, eOne, and Paramount Pictures.

Principal photography began in June 2021, with the official title announced as Transformers: Rise of the Beasts, confirmed to be set after the events of Bumblebee. Rise of the Beasts was originally scheduled for release in June 2022, but was delayed until June 9, 2023.

== See also ==
- List of Beast Wars characters
