= List of Beast Wars characters =

This is a list of characters in the Beast Wars franchise, which is part of the larger Transformers franchise from Hasbro. This includes characters appearing in an animated series, comics or video games. This does not include characters only appearing in collector's club or convention-related comics (from 3H or Fun Publications), or toy-only characters. Appearances within the Beast Wars Sourcebook are not counted as appearances within IDW fiction for purposes of this table, as the Beast Wars Sourcebook was an attempt to include all characters from all Beast Wars fiction.

== Introduced in Beast Wars ==
=== Maximals ===
==== Optimus Primal ====
Optimus Primal (voiced by Garry Chalk) is the commander of the Axalon crew, and the main character of both Beast Wars and Beast Machines. His beast mode is a gorilla. Optimus starts off the series as a charismatic and competent leader, but also young and inexperienced. As the series goes on, he proves to be highly competent with a strict form of honor, though he is somewhat irreverent and is perfectly willing to bend the law. A running gag throughout the series is his penchant for stuffy and long speeches, something that Rattrap and even Megatron mock him for. In "Other Voices", he goes on a risky mission to destroy the Vok Planet Buster. He succeeds, only to be killed thanks to a booby trap rigged by Megatron. However, in "The Coming of the Fuzors", Rhinox implants his spark in a blank protoform, reviving him in a Transmetal body. After Megatron fatally wounded Optimus Prime, threatening to erase the Maximals from existence, Optimus Primal takes his namesake's spark into his body, transforming him into the highly powerful Optimal Optimus. During the finale, he attacks the Nemesis after it fires on and kills Tigerhawk, before boarding it and battling Megatron. He defeats Megatron, and he and the Maximals tie him to an Autobots shuttle. Before they depart the planet, Optimus memorializes his dead friends and declares the Beast Wars over.

In the Japanese-only sequel series Beast Wars II: Super Life-Form Transformers, as part of its special Beast Wars II: Lio Convoy's Close Call!, Optimus Primal is transported to the present by Magnaboss to help Lio Convoy defeat Majin Zarak; saving him from his imminent death in the "Other Voices" two-parter at the end of the first season. The two descendants of Optimus Prime combine their Energon Matrix powers, achieving levels of strength neither had on their own before, as they launch a combined attack against Zarak which destroys him completely. Ultimately, Primal has to return to his own time once the battle; both because he didn't want to abandon his team still stranded in the past when they still needed him and because the time gate used to bring him there held a fatal flaw (the time tunnel had to be closed or else it would send out shockwaves through time and space which could affect the entire universe). As he and Lio Convoy part ways, Primal expresses pride on Lio Convoy for also living up to their ancestor and hope sthat they will see each other again someday and somehow.

In Beast Machines, Optimus becomes a more spiritual character, seeing visions from and communicating with the Oracle. He slowly becomes fanatical, becoming convinced that he must make Cybertron completely organic, resulting in him and Cheetor coming into conflict multiple times. Optimus is killed in a battle with Tankor and Megatron when he causes a storm of plasma energy. His spirit comes to the realization that he has become a fanatic and that his true purpose is to create a balance between the technological and the organic. After apologizing to his friends, Optimus chooses to remain on Cybertron rather than pass on, and is revived by the Oracle. Optimus then leads his companions on a quest to liberate the sparks Megatron had taken. After several failed attempts, he manipulates Megatron into allowing him to learn the location of the sparks. Optimus and the Maximals seemingly defeat Megatron, only for Megatron to return, leading his drones to extract the sparks of all except Optimus. Optimus battles Megatron, who absorbs the sparks of every Cybertronian and attempts to reformat Cybertron's core. Optimus distracts Megatron and knocks them both into the core, killing them but restoring the sparks to life. Optimus's spirit speaks to Cheetor one last time, before joining with the Matrix.

==== Cheetor ====
Cheetor (voiced by Ian James Corlett) is an impulsive young rookie whose beast mode is a cheetah. He looks up to his elders but doesn't always follow their orders, and he frequently gets into trouble. He matures throughout the series from a typical teenager to a capable warrior, aided by his mutations into a Transmetal and then a Transmetal II form granting him greater strength.

In Beast Machines, he is promoted to second-in-command after his suspicions about an organic tree being 'dangerous' to the Maximals' techno-organic beast modes prove correct, nearly causing Optimus, Blackarachnia and Rattrap to regress to their beast instincts. For a time Cheetor becomes the Maximals' military leader while Optimus becomes fixated on his new link to the Oracle, but Optimus eventually returns to his role as leader when he gains a better understanding of his mission. In the finale, it is strongly implied that Cheetor will become the new full-time leader after Optimus's death in the final battle.

==== Rhinox ====
Rhinox (voiced by Richard Newman) is the tech expert of the Axalon crew, close friend of Optimus, and the second-in-command whose beast mode is a rhinoceros. Rhinox is highly skilled in combat but is highly spiritual and loves nature. He is highly intelligent as well, serving as the Maximal's resident technician due to his tech-savvy nature. He primarily uses twin chainguns as weapons.

In Beast Machines, Rhinox is captured by Megatron and has his spark used to power the Vehicon general Tankor. Rhinox's personality is brought to the forefront by Optimus, but his time as Tankor had corrupted his personality and caused him to embrace Megatron's plan for a purely technological Cybertron. Rhinox decided that Megatron was unfit to carry out this plan and that he instead should be the one to do so. He began plotting against Megatron, intending to betray him. However, when Rhinox makes his final move and attempts to murder him, Megatron reveals he had programmed his generals to be unable to shoot him. Megatron shuts Rhinox off, and he is killed by plasma energy. Rhinox's spirit later approaches Optimus inside the Matrix, expressing regret for his misguided actions.

==== Rattrap ====
Rattrap (voiced by Scott McNeil) is the hacker, saboteur, and demolitions expert whose beast mode is a rat. He is cunning and resourceful, but sarcastic and querulous. Rattrap at first seems to come as a coward, often proclaiming "We're all gonna die!" whenever he is put in danger. However, he has proven himself to be quite brave, risking his life multiple times for his teammates. He develops an odd cross between a friendship and a rivalry with Dinobot, the two often bickering with each other, albeit sharing a mutual respect. After Dinobot's betrayal, Rattrap is enraged and loathes him for it, although he forgives Dinobot as he dies of his injuries.

In Beast Machines, Rattrap is unable to transform after being reformatted for several episodes due to his frantic nature; when he does, he finds his body is far weaker, resulting in him developing insecurities over his perceived uselessness and his teammates' anger at him. However, his new body eventually proves useful due to its ability to hack into technology. He later develops a relationship with Botanica.

==== Dinobot ====
Dinobot (voiced by Scott McNeil) is a warrior and former Predacon turned Maximal whose beast mode is a Velociraptor. Dinobot joined the Maximals after he attempted a failed coup against Megatron, believing they had crashlanded on a random planet. Dinobot values pride and honor above all else, sticking to a strict code of ethics. Dinobot's abrasive personality often leads to conflict with the other Maximals, particularly Rattrap; the two develop a strange cross between a rivalry and a friendship, often arguing with each other. After discovering the Golden Disks, Dinobot begins to wonder if the future can be changed or is set in stone, triggering an existential crisis that leads to him betraying the Maximals to Megatron temporarily. Dinobot discovers that the future can be changed after watching Megatron destroy a mountain, changing a future image of it to match its current state; realizing Megatron intends to wipe out the early humans, Dinobot battles the Predacons to prevent this. Dinobot succeeds, but is mortally wounded in the process, and dies shortly after the other Maximals arrive.

==== Tigerhawk ====
Tigerhawk (voiced by Blu Mankuma) is a fusion of Tigatron and Airazor created by the Vok. His beast mode is a white tiger/peregrine falcon hybrid, resembling a white tiger with the wings and front talons of a peregrine falcon. Tigerhawk rejoins the Maximals shortly before the end of Beast Wars, but dies in the finale, killed by Megatron using the Nemesis.

- Tigatron (voiced by Blu Mankuma) is a Maximal whose stasis pod was damaged, leaving him in an amnesiac state in his beast mode of a white tiger, Earthtron until he remembered his true allegiance after watching Megatron threaten the white tiger he had scanned. Tigatron serves as a scout, preferring to operate and live in the wilderness, though he still often aids the Maximals. He temporarily becomes a neutral party after inadvertently killing Snowstalker, a white tiger he had befriended and scanned for his beast mode, in a battle, though he returns to the Maximals after he realizes the Predacons would likely lay ravage to the wilderness. At the beginning of Season 2, he and Airazor go off to scout for stasis pods knocked out of orbit by the destruction of the Vok super weapon, and the two form a romantic relationship. However, the two are abducted by a Vok weapon that teleports them to the Vok homeworld where they are merged into Tigerhawk.
- Airazor (voiced by Pauline Newstone) is a female Maximal and scout who works closely with Tigatron and shares his fondness for Earth's beauty. Her beast mode is a peregrine falcon. At the beginning of Season 2, she and Tigatron go off to scout for stasis pods knocked out of orbit by the destruction of the Vok super weapon, and the two form a romantic relationship. However, the two are abducted by a Vok weapon that teleports them to the Vok homeworld where they are merged into Tigerhawk.

==== Silverbolt ====
Silverbolt (voiced by Scott McNeil) is a knight and has a chivalrous personality to match. His reluctance to ever hurt a female leads him to refuse fighting Blackarachnia; eventually, the two develop a romance and fall in love. He is a Fuzor whose beast mode is a wolf/golden eagle hybrid.

His beast mode in Beast Machines is a condor following his reformatting from his Jetstorm form.

==== Depth Charge ====
Depth Charge (voiced by David Sobolov) is a former security officer turned vigilante whose beast mode is a manta ray. He operates independently to hunt down and properly execute the criminal turned Predacon Rampage who had killed everyone in the colony Depth Charge had been assigned to protect. Depth Charge captured Rampage and brought him in. Believing Optimus would fail at transporting him, he followed them, winding up on prehistoric Earth with a Transmetal body. Depth Charge often works separately from the other Maximals and clashes with them, instead concentrating on hunting Rampage, though he often does wind up appearing to aid in the middle of a battle. In the series finale, he is sent to stop Megatron from activating the Nemesis. Rampage attacks him, and the two battle; ultimately, Depth Charge impales Rampage's spark with a piece of raw energon, causing a massive explosion that kills them both and sending their parts to the surface of the ocean.

==== Other Maximals ====
The following Maximals have appeared in other media adaptations outside of the toyline:

- Air Hammer is a Maximal Fuzor whose beast mode is a hammerhead shark/hawk. He has appeared in the IDW Publishing comics.
- Armordillo is a Maximal whose beast mode is a giant armadillo. He has appeared in the IDW Publishing comics.
- B'Boom is a Maximal whose beast mode is a mandrill and also possesses an artillery station mode. He has appeared in the IDW Publishing comics.
- Bantor is a Maximal Fuzor whose beast mode is a mandrill/tiger hybrid. He has appeared in the IDW Publishing comics.
- Bonecrusher is a Maximal whose beast mode is a bison. He has appeared in the IDW Publishing comics.
- Claw Jaw is a Maximal whose beast mode is a squid. He has appeared in the IDW Publishing comics.
- Convobat is a Maximal whose beast mode is a bat. He appeared in the Legends comics. Convobat is a recolored version of the original Optimus Primal.
- Cybershark is a Maximal whose beast mode is a hammerhead shark. He has appeared in the IDW Publishing comics. There is also a Transmetal 2 version of Cybershark whose beast mode is a great white shark.
- Grimlock is a Maximal whose beast mode is a Velociraptor. He has appeared in the IDW Publishing comics. Grimlock is a redeco of Dinobot.
- Jawbreaker is a Maximal whose beast mode is a Transmetal 2 hyena. He has appeared in the IDW Publishing comics and the Beast Wars: Uprising comics.
- K-9 is a Maximal whose beast mode is a German Shepherd. He has appeared in the IDW Publishing comics. K-9 is a redeco of Wolfang.
- Magnaboss is a combiner Maximal who is made up of three Maximals. He has appeared in the IDW Publishing comics and the Beast Wars: Uprising comics.
  - Ironhide is a Maximal whose beast mode is an elephant. He forms the bulk of Magnaboss's body.
  - Prowl is a Maximal whose beast mode is a lion. He forms the head of Magnaboss.
  - Silverbolt is a Maximal whose beast mode is a eagle unlike the Fuzor version that appeared later. He forms the helmet parts of the torso of Magnaboss.
- Nightglider is a Maximal whose beast mode is a Transmetal 2 flying squirrel. He has appeared in the IDW Publishing comics.
- Noctorro is a Maximal Fuzor whose beast mode is an American Brahman/bat hybrid. He has appeared in the IDW Publishing comics.
- Optimus Minor is a Maximal whose beast mode is a Transmetal 2 spider monkey. He has appeared in the IDW Publishing comics.
- Polar Claw is a Maximal whose beast mode is a polar bear. He has appeared in the IDW Publishing comics. and the Beast Wars: Uprising comics. As a counterpart of Scorponok, the right paw when Polar Claw is in his robot mode transforms into a bat drone.
- Prowl II is a Maximal whose beast mode is a Transmetal II great horned owl. He has appeared in the IDW Publishing comics.
- Ramulus is a Maximal whose beast mode is a Transmetal II ibex. He has appeared in the IDW Publishing comics.
- Razorbeast is a Maximal whose beast mode is a warthog. He has appeared in the IDW Publishing comics.
- Snarl is a Maximal whose beast mode is a Tasmanian devil. He has appeared in the IDW Publishing comics.
- Sonar is a Maximal whose beast mode is a Transmetal 2 bat. She has appeared in the IDW Publishing comics.
- Stinkbomb is a Maximal whose beast mode is a Transmetal 2 striped skunk. He has appeared in the IDW Publishing comics.
- Torca is a Maximal Fuzor whose beast mode is a killer whale/elephant hybrid. He has appeared in the IDW Publishing comics.
- Windrazor is a Maximal Fuzor whose beast mode is an arctic wolf/golden eagle. He has appeared in the IDW Publishing comics and 3H Comics where his origin in the latter has him created as the result of a spark fusion between the wolf Transformer Cub and the Veteran (implied to be the Dinobot Swoop). Windrazor is a redeco of the Fuzor version of Silverbolt.
- Wolfang is a Maximal whose beast mode is a gray wolf. He has appeared in the IDW Publishing comics.

=== Predacons ===
==== Megatron ====
Megatron (voiced by David Kaye) is the ruthless leader of the Darksyde crew of Predacons and the main antagonist of both Beast Wars and Beast Machines. Megatron's original beast mode is a purple Tyrannosaurus rex, but he later upgrades into a red dragon after stealing his namesake's spark and being knocked into lava. He inherited his name from the original Decepticon leader from Generation 1, and travels back in time after stealing the golden disk in an attempt to rewrite history so that his Decepticon ancestors will win the Great War against the Autobots, thereby ensuring the Predacons' supremacy.

==== Waspinator ====
Waspinator (voiced by Scott McNeil) is a dim-witted aerial fighter and comic relief who is often abused by both his fellow Predacons and the Maximals. He almost always refers to himself in the third person and blisters under his bad luck. His beast mode is a wasp.

By the end of Beast Wars, Waspinator was the only survivor of the Nemesis' fusion cannon attack.

In Beast Machines, Waspinator somehow found his way back to Cybertron where Megatron used his spark to create Thrust.

==== Tarantulas ====
Tarantulas (voiced by Alec Willows) is the treacherous and sadistic Predacon scientist on Megatron's crew with a tarantula beast mode who is later revealed to be a spy for the Tripedacus Council, thereby making him a descendant of Unicron. He often schemes against Megatron and hatches his own plans to destroy the Ark to erase both the Autobots and Decepticons, and thus the Maximals and Predacons, from existence. Tarantulas despises the extraterrestrial Vok and attempts to eradicate them on numerous occasions. Tarantulas meets his demise in the episode "Other Victories".

==== Terrorsaur ====
Terrorsaur (voiced by Doug Parker) is an ambitious and power-hungry aerial fighter who openly wishes to usurp Megatron as leader of the Predacons. His beast mode is a Pteranodon. Similar to Starscream, Terrorsaur makes numerous attempts to overthrow Megatron throughout the series, and on two occasions managed to successfully depose Megatron. However, he proved to be an incompetent leader.

During the season 2 premiere, he is killed during the quantum surge where he and Scorponok fall into a pit of lava.

==== Scorponok ====
Scorponok (voiced by Don Brown) is Megatron's loyal but unintelligent second-in-command whose beast mode is a scorpion. In spite of his idiocy, Scorponok is actually highly tech-savvy, developing weapons for the Predacons. On occasion however, these weapons backfire spectacularly. Scorponok possesses a toxic sting attack and can emit a bee drone from one of his claws.

Scorponok dies in the season 2 premiere when the quantum surge causes him and Terrorsaur to fall into a pit of lava.

==== Blackarachnia ====
Blackarachnia (voiced by Venus Terzo) is a female Predacon, who later defects to the Maximals. Her beast mode is a black widow spider. Blackarachnia's selfishness and desire to preserve her own life ironically placed her on the side of the Maximals, as she was unwilling to sacrifice her existence for Megatron's ambition. She falls in love with Silverbolt, which eventually leads her to fully leave the Predacons to join the Maximals.

In Beast Machines, Blackarachnia is a full Maximal, but still retains some bad-girl traits, and spends much of the show trying to find and get Silverbolt back, and then has to help him get over what he did as Jetstorm.

==== Inferno ====
Inferno (voiced by Jim Byrnes) was a blank protoform who received damage landing on Earth, and went insane, gaining the mentality of an army ant that is tied in with his fire ant beast mode: aggressive, obedient, and loyal to the colony (his stasis pod), as well as making him violent and homicidal. He was defeated by Tigatron, who destroyed his stasis pod, but Megatron reprogrammed Inferno to view Megatron as the queen of his colony. Inferno exhibits symptoms of pyromania, taking great joy in using his flamethrower to burn things, and is fanatically loyal to Megatron, willing to lose his own life to aid Megatron and killing anyone Megatron orders him to. This results in him being promoted to Megatron's second-in-command after the death of Scorponok. Ironically, he is inadvertently killed by Megatron in the series finale when he is caught in the crossfire of the Nemesis fusion cannon.

==== Quickstrike ====
Quickstrike (voiced by Colin Murdoch) is an aggressive and highly violent sociopath who is obsessed with fighting and speaks with a Texan accent. He is a Fuzor and his beast mode is a scorpion with a cobra-headed tail known as Legion. Quickstrike and Silverbolt were both Maximal protoforms whose stasis pods malfunctioned and turned them into Fuzors, Transformers with the ability to transform into hybrid beast modes. Quickstrike quickly fell in with the Predacons due to his violent personality, and stuck with them even after Silverbolt defected. Quickstrike is highly impulsive, making him easily manipulated. Blackarachnia and Tarantulas exploit this to convince him to aid in their plans to overthrow Megatron. In the third season, Tarantulas has Quickstrike attempt to murder Megatron by pushing him into a pit of lava. Megatron survives and attempts to execute Quickstrike, only to pardon him and allow him back into the Predacon forces after Tigerhawk arrives. In the series finale, Quickstrike and Inferno are killed when they are caught in the crossfire of the Nemesis when Megatron has it blast the primitive humans' settlement.

==== Rampage/Protoform X ====
Rampage/Protoform X (voiced by Campbell Lane) was created by a Maximal experiment to recreate Starscream's immortal spark; while he became nigh invulnerable, he was also left in constant pain, driving him insane and causing him to become a violent serial killer. He went on a killing spree, wiping out multiple colonies before being captured by Depth Charge and put into stasis. He was placed aboard the Axalon, to be dumped on a barren planet, only for Protoform X to be ejected during the fight with the Darksyde at the beginning of the series. He is eventually revived after his stasis pod falls out of orbit, gains a giant red king crab beast mode which also has a tank mode, and goes on a rampage, attacking Maximals and Predacons alike until he is defeated by Silverbolt. Megatron finds his unconscious body and tears out half of his spark, using it to keep him under his control after throwing him in the Restoration Chamber and renames him Rampage. Rampage is clearly angry with this arrangement, frequently expressing his hatred for Megatron and occasionally threatening him. In "Transmutate", a more sympathetic side of Rampage is shown when he meets the titular character, a deformed and simpleminded Transformer, befriending it and talking Megatron out of executing it and into allowing it to join the Predacons. Ultimately, Transmutate is destroyed while stopping Rampage and Silverbolt, both of whom it had bonded with, from killing each other. Rampage is grief-stricken and allows the Maximals to leave without a fight. In the third season, Depth Charge arrives on Earth to hunt down Rampage, who is thrilled by this and the opportunity for revenge. The two fight numerous times over the course of the series, Rampage always narrowly escaping from death. Megatron uses his half of Rampage's spark to create Dinobot II, who willingly inflicts damage upon the spark to keep Rampage in line. In the series finale, Rampage attacks Depth Charge while he tries to destroy the Nemesis. The two battle once again; ultimately, a cackling Rampage allows Depth Charge to impale him with a shard of raw energon, causing a massive explosion that kills them both.

==== Dinobot II ====
Dinobot II (voiced by Scott McNeil) is a clone of the original Dinobot in Transmetal 2 form. He possesses half of the spark of Rampage, given by Megatron to make sure Rampage is under control. Unlike the original Dinobot, he blindly follows Megatron, never challenging orders. However, in the Beast Wars finale, the death of Rampage causes him to retake the personality of the original Dinobot and rebel against Megatron, saving the Maximals and the future. However, he dies in the explosion of the Nemesis after bidding Optimus Primal a final farewell.

==== Other Predacons ====
The following Predacons have appeared in other media adaptations outside of the toyline:

- Buzzclaw is a Predacon Fuzor whose beast mode is a lizard/mantis hybrid. He has appeared in the IDW Publishing comics.
- Buzz Saw is a Predacon whose beast mode is a yellowjacket. He has appeared in the IDW Publishing comics. Buzz Saw is a redeco of Waspinator.
- Drill Bit is a Predacon whose beast mode is a boll weevil. He has appeared in the IDW Publishing comics.
- Iguanus is a Predacon whose beast mode is a frilled lizard. He has appeared in the IDW Publishing comics. There is also a Transmetal 2 version of Iguanus with the same beast mode.
- Injector is a Predacon Fuzor whose beast mode is a lionfish/hornet hybrid. He has appeared in the IDW Publishing comics.
- Insecticon is a Predacon whose beast mode is a stag beetle. He has appeared in the IDW Publishing comics.
- Jetstorm is a Predacon whose beast mode is a dragonfly. He has appeared in the IDW Publishing comics.
- Lazorbeak is a Predacon whose beast mode is a Pteranodon. He has appeared in the IDW Publishing comics. Lazorbeak is a redeco of Terrorsaur.
- Manterror is a Predacon whose beast mode is a mantis. He appeared in the IDW Publishing comics.
- Megalligator is a Predacon whose beast mode is an alligator. He appeared in Beast Wars: Uprising. Megalligator is a recolored version of the original Megatron whose action figure is a retooled version of Iguanus.
- Powerpinch is a Predacon whose beast mode is an earwig. He has appeared in the IDW Publishing comics.
- Razorclaw is a Predacon whose beast mode is a fiddler crab. He has appeared in the IDW Publishing comics.
- Retrax is a Predacon whose beast mode is a pillbug. He has appeared in the IDW Publishing comics.
- Scarem is a Predacon whose beast mode is a Transmetal 2 beetle that evokes the traits of the scarab beetle and the European stag beetle. He has appeared in the IDW Publishing comics.
- Scavenger is a Predacon whose beast mode is a Transmetal ant with a double-drill tank form. He has appeared in the IDW Publishing comics.
- Scourge is a Predacon whose beast mode is a Transmetal 2 locust. He has appeared in the IDW Publishing comics.
- Shokaract is a Predacon whose beast mode is a Transmetal king crab. He has appeared in the IDW Publishing comics. Shokaract is a redeco of Rampage.
- Sky Shadow is a Predacon Fuzor whose beast mode is an iguana/dragonfly hybrid. He has appeared in the IDW Publishing comics.
- Snapper is a Predacon whose beast mode is a alligator snapping turtle. He has appeared in the IDW Publishing comics.
- Spittor is a Predacon whose beast mode is a poison dart frog. He has appeared in the IDW Publishing comics. There is also a Transmetal 2 version of Spittor with the same beast mode.
- Terragator is a Predacon Fuzor whose beast mode is an alligator/turtle hybrid. He has appeared in the IDW Publishing comics.
- Transquito is a Predacon whose beast mode is a mosquito and also has an antlion-type combat mode. He has appeared in the IDW Publishing comics.
- Tripedacus is a combiner Predacon who is made up of three Predacons and are members of the Tripredacus Council. He appears in the IDW Publishing comics and Beast Wars: Uprising.
  - Cicadacon is a Predacon whose beast mode is a cicada. He forms the head and chest of Tripredacus.
  - Ram Horn is a Predacon whose beast mode is a rhinoceros beetle. He forms the arms of Tripredacus.
  - Sea Clamp is a Predacon whose beast mode is a lobster. He forms the legs of Tripredacus.

=== Mutants ===
The Mutants are Cybertronians that can transform from one animal form to another animal form as a side effect of Megatron's anti-conversion virus that left them unable to have Cybertronian forms. They represent their own side as they are not on the side of the Maximals or the Predacons. Each of the Mutants have appeared in the IDW Publishing comics.

- Icebird is a mutant who can transform between a snowy owl and a polar bear.
- Poison Bite is a mutant who can transform between a scorpion and a barracuda.
- Razor Claw is a mutant who can transform between a Velociraptor and a wolverine.
- Soundwave is a mutant who can transform between a bat and an alligator.

== Introduced in Beast Machines ==
=== Maximals in Beast Machines ===
==== Nightscream ====
Nightscream (voiced by Alessandro Juliani) is an urban youth who never left Cybertron. He survived on his own during the Vehicon invasion until he was found by Optimus. His beast mode is a vampire bat when the Maximals first find him and found that he had been eating the strange fruit underground. When Optimus Primal reformats him, Nightscream takes on this name and gains abilities in his transformed state where he can fly and drain energy from Vehicon drones.

==== Noble/Savage ====
Noble/Savage (voiced by David Kaye) is an organism that changes between a werewolf and a fire-breathing mutant dragon. It was unintentionally created and possessed by Megatron when he tried to purge his own beast mode. After being abandoned by Megatron's spark, the creature continued to live in an animal-like state, forming a bond with Nightscream, similar to that of a boy and his dog. Noble is killed defending Nightscream from Megatron.

==== Botanica ====
Botanica (voiced by Kathleen Barr) is a scientist and botanist and the only survivor of her own exploration crew. She transforms into a humanoid plant-like creature, making her the only Maximal whose beast mode is not actually an animal. Optimus Primal reformats Botanica when her plant mode goes on a rampage and she joins up with the Maximals.

=== Dinobots ===
The Dinobots were created by the Oracle from information gathered from the late Dinobot's spark and were created to aid the Maximals against Megatron and the Vehicons. They each appeared in the 3H Comics, the IDW Publishing comics, and the Beast Wars: Uprising comics.

- T-Wrecks is the leader of the Dinobots whose beast mode is a Tyrannosaurus. T-Wrecks is a redeco of Megatron.
- Airraptor is a member of the Dinobots whose beast mode is an Archaeopteryx.
- Dinotron is a member of the Dinobots whose beast mode is a Pachycephalosaurus. Dinotron is a redeco of Dinobot.
- Striker is a member of the Dinobots whose beast mode is a Stegosaurus.
- Triceradon is a member of the Dinobots whose beast mode is a Triceratops. He serves as T-Wrecks' second-in-command

=== Vehicons ===
The Vehicons are the second group that is led by Megatron. The foot soldiers are just drones that are led by Vehicons who sport the different sparks in Megatron's possession.

==== Jetstorm ====
Jetstorm (voiced by Brian Drummond) is a psychopathic Vehicon general who transforms into a fighter jet and commands the Aero Drones that are modeled after him. He was the brainwashed spark of Silverbolt until Blackarachnia restored him to normal.

==== Tankor ====
Tankor (voiced by Paul Dobson as the original voice, Richard Newman in Rhinox' voice) is the brutish Vehicon who turns into a tank and is the general of the Tank Drones that are modeled after him. He was the brainwashed spark of Rhinox. After breaking free from Megatron's control, the corrupted Rhinox embraced his new name and vehicle form and planned on usurping Megatron as the ruler of Cybertron.

==== Thrust ====
Thrust (voiced by Jim Byrnes) is a suave Vehicon general who transforms into a motorcycle and commands the Cycle Drones that are modeled after him. He was the brainwashed spark of Waspinator.

==== Obsidian and Strika ====
Obsidian (voiced by Paul Dobson) and Strika (voiced by Patricia Drake) are a pair of Vehicon generals who once were Autobots. Obsidian transforms into a tiltrotor while Strika transforms into a six-wheeled Armoured fighting vehicle where they lead the Copter Drones and Artillery Drones that are modeled after them. Although reputed and proven to be the most intelligent military tacticians in history, Obsidian and Strika had limited moral judgement and were absolutely obedient to whoever is in power, thus making them allied to Megatron who had successfully taken over Cybertron at the time.

==== Mole Drones ====
The Mole Drones are large, autonomous Subterrene that are used by the vehicons for digging purposes and are not genuine transformers with robot modes.

=== Diagnostic Drones ===
The Diagnostic Drones (voiced by Paul Dobson and Christopher Gaze) are small, hovering robots built to assist transformers in various tasks and appear in the show as servants of Megatron. One of these drones serves as Megatron's personal assistant until Rhinox/Tankor reprograms it to serve him instead.

== See also ==
- Beast Wars II Characters
- Beast Wars Neo Characters
