= Doug Parker (voice actor) =

Canadian voice actor and animation director

Doug Parker is a Canadian voice actor and animation director. He has been active in the industry since 1985. He has cast, and directed many animated shows and films. He also has voiced characters in several cartoons and anime; he is probably best known for his work in ToddWorld, which was nominated as an outstanding children's animated program. His character Terrorsaur in Beast Wars: Transformers is also well-known, as well as Starscream. Doug also provided the voice of Prince Adam in The New Adventures of He-Man (1990).

== Filmography ==
=== Voice over roles ===
- At Jesus' Side - Roman Soldier
- Barbie and the Rockers: Out of this World - Various
- Barbie and The Sensations: Rockin' Back to Earth - Various
- Beast Wars: Transformers - Terrorsaur, Starscream
- Bucky O'Hare and the Toad Wars! - Additional Voices
- Camelot: The Legend - Guard
- Camp Candy - Additional Voices
- Candy Land: The Great Lollipop Adventure - Jolly & Gloppy
- Captain N: The Game Master - Mega Man
- Conan the Adventurer - Skulkur, Dregs, The Kari Dragon, Windfang, Venturas, Zogar Sag
- Dragon Ball - Shao, Shenron (1995 dub)
- Dragon Ball Z (Ocean dub) - Bubbles, Gregory, Raspberry, Mez, Icarus/Higher Dragon
- Dragon Tales - Wyatt the Wishing Well, Bird
- Fat Dog Mendoza - Pink-Haired Alien, Carl Nussbaum, Patron #2 Arnie, Dave the Dung Beetle
- Funky Fables - Misc.
- George of the Jungle - Undead Rhino
- Generation O! - Mr. O!
- Greatest Heroes and Legends of the Bible
- G.I. Joe: A Real American Hero - Additional Voices
- Goodtimes Fairy Tales - Miscellaneous Characters
- Jester Till - Lamme, Bird Announcer, Doctor
- Kissyfur - Jolene
- Let's Chop Soo-E
- Make Way for Noddy - Sly (US Re-Dub)
- Milo's Bug Quest - Nikolai
- Ninja Turtles: The Next Mutation - Shredder
- Personality Software
- Pocket Dragon Adventures - Walter
- Ranma ½ - Chemistry Club Leader (Episode 8) (English dub)
- RoboCop: Alpha Commando - Additional Voices
- Sleeping Beauty - Misc
- Spiff and Hercules - Additional Voices
- Street Fighter - Wong Who (Episode: "Final Fight")
- Street Sharks - Bad Rap, Spittor, Haxx
- Tales From the Far Side - Miscellaneous Characters
- Tales From the Far Side II - Miscellaneous Characters
- The Adventures of Corduroy - Additional Voices
- The Adventures of T-Rex - Additional Voices
- The Brothers Grunt - Frank, Tony, Dean, Bing, Sammy, Perry, Various
- The Cramp Twins - Announcer
- The Magic Trolls and the Troll Warriors
- The New Adventures of He-Man - Prince Adam, Hoove, Wall Street, Meloc
- The New Adventures of Kimba The White Lion - Additional Voices (English dub)
- The Wonderful Wizard of Oz - Wizard of Oz
- Transformers: Armada - Tidal Wave
- Transformers: Energon - Tidal Wave, Mirage
- Warriors of Virtue - Yee, Chi
- Weird-Ohs - Additional Voices
- Zoids - Vulcan
- Zoids Fuzors - Vulcan

=== Live action roles ===
- Warhead - Penn

== Staff work ==
=== Casting director ===
- A Klondike Christmas
- Barbie and the Rockers: Out of this World
- Barbie and The Sensations: Rockin' Back to Earth
- Beast Wars: Transformers
- Camp Candy
- Devil Kings
- G.I. Joe: A Real American Hero
- G.I. Joe: Operation Dragonfire
- In Search of Santa
- RoboCop: Alpha Commando
- Sengoku Basara
- The New Adventures of He-Man
- Under the Skin
- Weird-Oh's

=== Voice director ===
- Ark
- At Jesus's Side
- Ben Hur
- Devil Kings
- Donner
- Dragon Ball
- Dragon Warrior
- Funky Fables
- Greatest Heroes and Legends of the Bible
- G.I. Joe: A Real American Hero
- G.I. Joe: Operation Dragonfire
- Heroes on Hot Wheels
- In Search of Santa
- Legends of Chima
- RoboCop: Alpha Commando
- Rudolph the Red-Nosed Reindeer: The Movie
- Rudolph the Red-Nosed Reindeer and the Island of Misfit Toys
- Sengoku Basara
- Spiff and Hercules
- Tales From the Far Side
- The Animated Adventures of Tom Sawyer
- The Bots Master
- The Brothers Grunt
- The Wonderful Wizard of Oz
- ToddWorld
- Under the Skin
- Video Power (The Power Team segments)
- Weird-Oh's

=== Miscellaneous crew ===
- Air Bud: Golden Receiver - Parrot ADR
- Bitsy Bears - Casting Production Assistant
- Camp Candy - Recording Assistant
- Captain N: The Game Master - Talent Coordinator
- The Curious Case of Benjamin Button - ADR Recordist
- Head Above Water - 2nd Assistant Sound Editor
- Little Golden Book Land - Talent Coordinator
- My Little Pony Tales - Casting Advisor
- National Treasure - Assistant Sound Effects Editor
- Rudolph the Red-Nosed Reindeer and the Island of Misfit Toys - Assistant to Producer
- Stellaluna - Dialogue Director
- The Curious Case of Benjamin Button - ADR Recordist
- The New Adventures of Little Toot - Director
- ToddWorld - Director
- Video Power - Dialogue Director (The Power Team segments)
- Warriors of Virtue - ADR Casting
- Who Shot Rock & Roll: The Film - Mix Technician

Preceded by Christopher Collins	Voice of Starscream; 1996	Succeeded by Michael Dobson
