= Barbie and the Rockers: Out of This World =

1987 television special directed by Bernard Deyriès

- VHS cover
- Genre: Adventure; Musical; Science fiction
- Written by: Bill Dubay; Martha Moran; Ruth Handler
- Directed by: Bernard Deyriès
- Starring: Sharon Lewis
- Music by: Haim Saban; Shuki Levy
- Country of origin: United States
- Original language: English

Production
- Producers: Eric S. Rollman; Andy Heyward
- Editors: John Carnochan; Derek Iversen
- Running time: 30 minutes
- Production companies: DIC Animation City; Saban Productions; Mattel

Original release
- Network: Syndication
- Release: September 28, 1987

Related
- Barbie and the Sensations: Rockin' Back to Earth

Barbie and the Rockers: Out of This World is a 1987 American animated television special created by DIC Animation City with Saban Productions featuring popular Mattel character Barbie. The story was based on the Barbie and the Rockers line of dolls, which featured Barbie as the leader of a rock band. The special originally aired in syndication. It was later released as a single tape (on VHS, or an exceedingly rare Betamax tape) by Hi-Tops Video. Foreign rights were assumed by Channel 5 Video, a joint-venture of Heron Communications (owners of Hi-Tops) and PolyGram. A sequel was broadcast in 1988 under the title Barbie and the Sensations: Rockin' Back to Earth.

Mattel had largely avoided media centered around the Barbie character prior to this special's release, in large part because of their reluctance to provide personality to a doll long seen as a "blank slate" for girls to use their imaginations with. Competition from Hasbro's Jem line however—which had a daily cartoon in syndication at the time—prompted Mattel to begin multimedia expansion.

The miniseries was allegedly supposed to have been the pilot for a daily Barbie cartoon series, but negotiations between DIC and Mattel fell through, and the project eventually emerged with a whole new set of characters—and the sponsorship of Mattel rival Hasbro—as Maxie's World in 1988. These plans, if they existed, were likely unrelated to a planned live-action/animated hybrid newsmagazine under the Barbie name that Mattel had planned for 1987; this show never made it to air.

== Plot ==
Barbie's rock band completes a successful world tour and decides to perform one last concert in space to promote world peace.

== Songs ==
This is a list of the songs featured in Barbie & Rockers: Out of This World, in order of appearance:

- "Barbie and the Rockers Theme"
- "Catch Us If You Can" - The Dave Clark Five
- "Best Friends" - Sharon Lewis
- "I'm Happy Just to Dance with You" (The Beatles cover) – Sharon Lewis
- "Do You Believe in Magic" (The Lovin' Spoonful cover) – Sharon Lewis
- "Reachin for the Stars" – Sharon Lewis
- "Everybody Rock" – Sharon Lewis
- "Ending Titles"

== Cast ==
- Sharon Lewis as Barbie
- Michael Benyaer as Ken
- Doug Parker as Derek
- Mary Adams as Dana Yeosan
- Sarah Jayson as Ophelia "Diva" Butler
- Joanne Wilson as Dee Dee Schwitzerson

=== Additional voices ===
- Garry Chalk
- Doc Harris
- Lynn Johnson
- Viktoria Langton
- Debbie Lick
- Cathy Mead
- Doug Parker
- John Payne
- Nikki Sharp
- Veena Sood
- John Stocker
