= Barbie and the Rockers =

Barbie toyline created by Mattel

Barbie and the Rockers (known as Barbie and the Rockstars in European areas) is a doll line created in the mid-1980s by Mattel to compete with Hasbro's popular Jem doll line. They were on the market for roughly three years. Two direct-to-video specials based on the line, Barbie and the Rockers: Out of This World and Barbie and the Sensations: Rockin' Back to Earth, were released in 1987 and 1988. The characters include Diva (a Scottish-Irish-American redhead), Dana (a Korean-American), Dee-Dee (an African-American), and Derek; Ken joined the band in later waves.

== History ==
In 1985, Hasbro, long unable to compete with Mattel's near-monopoly on the fashion doll market with Barbie, opted to create Jem, concerning the titular singer (who assumed a dual identity via the supercomputer Synergy, which enabled her to appear as Jem via realistic holographic disguises) and her soap opera-esque tribulations, including love triangles and rivalries with other bands; as with other Hasbro toylines of the era (such as G.I. Joe: A Real American Hero), it was accompanied by an animated series created by Sunbow Productions and Marvel Productions (initially as a segment of the animated anthology Super Sunday before becoming a standalone show).

Seeking to complete, Mattel rushed the Barbie and the Rockers line into production, with Mattel's line reaching store shelves before Hasbro's Jem products could; rumors have circulated for years as to how Mattel was able to beat Hasbro to the punch (one theory involving corporate espionage in Hong Kong, where both companies had toy factories in close proximity). Both lines also had an assortment of similar dolls and accessories, leading some to speculate as to if Mattel indeed had leaked information (for their part, Mattel denied these claims). Both companies' spokespeople continued to issue terse statements over the alleged plagiarism; additional controversy was attracted by the initial absence of Ken from the toyline, with Mattel having to make clear that Derek, the only male band member, was only "good friends" with Barbie. Regardless, a Ken doll eventually joined the band's lineup. By this time, Jem had advanced to become the 10th best-selling toy on the market; this was the closest any doll line had come to unseating Barbie's status as the top-selling doll on the market.

During this time, Mattel had created plans for a live touring version of the Rockers. As part of this, ads for a talent search to fill the role of Barbie were placed into industry publications as early as October 1986. The plans called for Giorgio Moroder to produce songs for the tour, but after a tryout audition at the St. James Theatre in New York, the plans were quietly scuttled. Mattel instead opted to use models who lip-synced to pre-recorded music.

To counter Hasbro's animated series, Mattel commissioned a direct-to-video special from DiC Animation City, to be released by Hi-Tops Video (the children's arm of Media Home Entertainment) in the fall of 1987; this was something Mattel had previously avoided, thanks to Barbie having long been marketed as a "blank slate", leading to an internal fear that characterizing Barbie would lead to her being characterized in a cartoonish fashion with "nothing left to the imagination". Mattel began aggressively marketing Barbie and the Rockers with a mall tour in both the United States and Canada and via tie-in merchandise, including picture books and lunch boxes. The marketing blitz (initiated by future Mattel CEO Jill Barad) was topped by consecutive appearances by Barbie and the Rockers during the 1986 and 1987 Macy's Thanksgiving Day Parade.

Mattel's dominance over the doll marketplace resulted in Jem not having enough shelf space at major retailers; other economic issues contributed to by both Mattel (including the aforementioned marketing blitz) and by Jem's own design resulted in the demise of the Jem line by late 1987 (though the Jem TV series continued to run into 1988). With Jem out of the way, the Rockers were replaced by a new band concept that year; Barbie and the Sensations (again renamed in Europe, as Barbie and the BiBops) opted to move from 1980s rock to a 1950s-retro "doo wop" act. An additional animated special was created for this line (following on the end of the preceding Barbie and the Rockers special), and was released by Hi-Tops in February 1988 (one of Hi-Top's first titles with closed-captioning).

== Toys ==
In addition to the dolls themselves (later waves of which advertised "real dancing action"), the packaging included punch-out cardboard items themed after music (ie. sheet music), and audio cassettes with music from the band were often included. Vehicles and playsets included tour vehicles and a concert stage (recycled from Mattel's Donny and Marie Osmond dolls of the late 1970s, in part because of a rushed development cycle).

Since the line's discontinuation in the 1980s, various "throwback"-style dolls in homage have been released by Mattel, most recently a Target-exclusive line of new Rocker dolls in 2017.

== See also ==
- Jem
- Maxie (Hasbro's next attempt to counter Barbie)
