= The New Adventures of He-Man =

1980s Animated Series

- New Adventures of He-Man title screen
- Genre: Sword and planet Superhero
- Based on: Masters of the Universe by Mattel
- Developed by: Jean Chalopin; Jack Olesker
- Voices of: Garry Chalk; Don Brown; Ted Cole; Michael Donovan; Tracy Eisner; Mark Hildreth; Anthony Holland; Campbell Lane; Scott McNeil; Doug Parker
- Composers: Haim Saban; Shuki Levy
- Countries of origin: United States; France; Japan
- Original language: English
- No. of seasons: 1
- No. of episodes: 65 (list of episodes)

Production
- Executive producer: Jean Chalopin
- Producers: Mark Taylor; Yasuyuki Takei
- Running time: 30 minutes
- Production companies: Parafrance Communications; Jetlag Productions; Mattel

Original release
- Network: First-run syndication
- Release: December 4, 1989 – December 7, 1990

Related
- He-Man and the Masters of the Universe; She-Ra: Princess of Power; He-Man and the Masters of the Universe (2002 TV series)

The New Adventures of He-Man is an animated series which ran in syndication starting in the second half of 1990. A pre-syndication early clearance of the series began in December, 1989 on select market independent stations, while Mattel released the toy line He-Man, an update of their Masters of the Universe line. The cartoon series was intended to be a continuation of Filmation's He-Man and the Masters of the Universe series, but Filmation's parent Westinghouse Broadcasting had shut down the studio a year earlier. Instead, while existing in the same continuity, a new central story was created for this series. It is also the first He-Man series to feature a Canadian voice cast.

This would mark the final entry in the original Masters of the Universe continuity, as the franchise as a whole would be rebooted twelve years later with He-Man and the Masters of the Universe.

The 2021 series Masters of the Universe: Revelation follows continuity of the original series but branches off into its own continuity from before the events of this series.

== Synopsis ==
He-Man, legendary defender of the planet Eternia, has been summoned to the futuristic planet of Primus to defend the planet from the evil Mutants of the neighboring planet of Denebria. However, his old adversary Skeletor has followed him and allied himself with the Mutants in his fight to conquer the whole universe. Together with a team of Galactic Guardians from Primus, He-Man fights to defend the planet and all its power resources from the continuous attacks by Skeletor and the Mutants.

== Characters ==
- He-Man/Prince Adam (voiced by Doug Parker as Adam, Garry Chalk as He-Man) – The protector of Eternia who is summoned to Primus to help fight the Evil Mutants. When on Primus, Adam turns into He-Man by quoting "By the power of Eternia, I have the Power."
- Skeletor (voiced by Campbell Lane) – The archenemy of He-Man. Upon being accidentally brought to Primus, Skeletor forms an alliance with the Evil Mutants of Denebria by telling Flogg that he will help him take over Primus in exchange for Flogg helping him destroy He-Man. By the end of the series, Skeletor and Crita are last seen in a shuttle pod disappearing into the depths of space.

=== Galactic Guardians ===
- Flipshot (voiced by Scott McNeil) – A space pilot from the cloud city of Levitan. He is also known as Icarius in the toyline.
- Hydron (voiced by Don Brown) – An undersea commander and the captain of the Starship Eternia who comes from Primus' underwater city of Serus.
- Kayo (voiced by Don Brown) – A space warrior and space pilot from Onnor in the Terra region of Primus. He is also known as Tatarus in the toyline.
- Nocturna (voiced by Alvin Sanders) – A martial artist and master of stealth from the Eastern continent of Mida. He was mostly seen as a background character.
- Vizar (voiced by Don Brown) – A warrior with strong powers of sight who comes from the ancient city of Olympic in the Opal region of Primus.
- Tuskador (voiced by Alvin Sanders) – An intergalactic merchant warrior from the Polarides star system with swiveling tusks on his mammoth-like armor that he uses to catch the enemy mutants with. He is also called Insyzor in the toyline.
- Artilla (voiced by Garry Chalk) – A cyborg weapons expert who was formerly part of a bounty hunter group. Artilla can deploy weapons from his body. He is also called Weaponstronic in the toyline.
- Spinwit (voiced by Ted Cole) – A warrior from the planet Zil who can create tornadoes by spinning. He is also called Tornado in the toyline.
- Sagitar (voiced by Campbell Lane) – A Horse Lord and former slave in the Denebrian Mines and arch-enemy of Staghorn who comes from the planet Equinos. His kind can turn from centaur-like beings to four-armed humanoids. He is also called Tharkus in the toyline.

=== Evil Mutants of Denebria ===
- Flogg (voiced by Alvin Sanders) – The leader of the Evil Mutants of Denebria. Flogg is a military commander of the Mutant Armada which he commands from the Mutant Mothership. Skeletor forges an alliance with Flogg where Skeletor will help him take over Primus in exchange for Flogg helping to destroy He-Man. By the end of the series, Flogg surrenders and ends up signing a peace treaty between Primus and Denebria. He is also called Brakk in the toyline.
- Slush Head (voiced by Ted Cole) – An incompetent amphibious mutant with cybernetic tentacles. Slush Head serves as Flogg's second-in-command and the co-pilot of the Mutant Mothership. Slush Head comes from the Quagmi Swamp, a place on Denebria that most other Mutants find disgusting because of its deadly creatures and foul stench. In the toyline, he is also called Kalamarr.
- Optikk (voiced by Don Brown) – A cyborg with an eye for a head.
- Karatti (voiced by Ted Cole) – A mutant with deadly martial arts skills who is often paired with Hoove.
- Hoove (voiced by Doug Parker) – A mutant with powerful kicks who is often paired with Karatti.
- Lizorr – A reptilian humanoid mutant from the desert of Gorn. He was mostly seen as a background character. In "Glastnost Schmaznost," Lizorr was shown to extend his tongue as seen when he wraps it around He-Man's arm.
- Quakke (voiced by Don Brown) – A super-strong mutant warrior who can shake the ground by hitting it with his Grabatron Meteormace. He is also called Earthquake in the toyline.
- Staghorn (voiced by Ted Cole) – A scheming Evil Mutant tracker that wears a helmet with large metal pikes protruding from it which he uses in battle to pick up his enemies and throw them around. He comes from the Regula Mountains in the deepest, darkest part of the frozen Fog Zone on Denebria. Staghorn is the archenemy of Sagitar.
- Butthead (voiced by Scott McNeil) – A mutant who attacks his enemies by ramming them with his head. Known as "B.H." on the cartoon.
- Crita (voiced by Venus Terzo) – A crafty female Mutant and later Queen of the Gleanons. She is an attractive and ruthless Evil Mutant who works on the Mutant Mothership and is attracted to Skeletor. By the end of the series, He-Man traps Skeletor and Crita in a shuttle pod and banishes them into space.
- Tech Mutants – Two unnamed Mutants that work as scientists for Flogg.
- Mutant Troopers – The generic foot soldiers of the Evil Mutants. Some of them are shock troopers while others pilot their shuttle pods for air attacks.

=== Other characters ===
- Master Sebrian (voiced by Anthony Holland) – The wisest and most knowledgeable man on the planet Primus and the only one who Adam reveals his secret identity to. To help keep Adam's secret, Master Sebrian allows Adam to pass off as his merchant nephew from Levitan. He also has a knowledge of magical spells.
- Mara (voiced by Venus Terzo) – An assistant of Master Sebrian, ambassador of Primus, and eventually the leader of the Galactimytes. She is shown to have good fighting skills when she goes up against Crita.
- The Scientists of Primus – The Scientists of Primus are the four greatest scientists of the planet whom, while intelligent, often provide the comedy relief in the show.
  - Alcon (voiced by Garry Chalk) – Member of the Scientists of Primus. He is very flamboyant and full of himself. Behind the massive ego of Alcon is a brilliant mind that he used to save Primus on more than one occasion.
  - Gepple (voiced by Don Brown) – Member of the Scientists of Primus. Even though most of the time he's just as bickering and cowardly as his partners, there are times that Gepple is more level-headed than the others. Gepple is also the inventor of a glue called "Gepple Goo" which has come in handy in most episodes.
  - Krex (voiced by Scott McNeil) – Member of the Scientists of Primus and the smartest of the group. He has a terrible memory of things.
  - Meldoc (voiced by Doug Parker) – Member of the Scientists of Primus. He has a tendency of falling asleep where he dreams of his next invention causing the other three scientists to give him a rude awakening.
- Drissi (voiced by Tracy Eisner) – Tends to the animals on planet Primus in its Oasis and occasionally lends a hand to the Galactic Guardians with her piloting skills and telepathic control over creatures.
- Caz (voiced by Mark Hildreth) – A young boy with a thirst for adventure. It is hinted that he may be the heir to the rightful rulers of Primus.
- Gleep (voiced by Ted Cole) – A robot that is often seen working for Master Sebrian.
- U-R – A robot who assists the Scientists of Primus and doesn't like being bossed around.
- Werban (voiced by Don Brown) – The secretary of the Inner Council who cares for their needs. He has been shown to be jealous of Master Sebrian and misguided at times.
- Meliac – A cyclops-like trader from Gorn City, Denebria that befriends He-Man. He later becomes the sheriff of Gorn City.
- Grot – A hippopotamus-like creature who handles Primus' gardens where he grows the food for the planet. He cares deeply for his garden.
- Priman Troopers – The foot soldiers of Primus.
- Korac – The former mayor of Gorn City who often does business with Skeletor.
- Mytes – The Mytes are a short race of peaceful aliens from the planet Nekron.
  - President Pell (voiced by Garry Chalk) – The wise and compassionate leader of the Mytes.
  - Vice President Etor (voiced by Ted Cole) – The second-in-command to President Pell who is also the best star pilot in the Myte Fleet.
  - Ambassador Bimo – The Mytes ambassador to Primus.
- Gleanons – The Gleanons are a race of hostile aliens from the planet Nekron who are often in league with Crita.
  - General Nifel (voiced by Michael Donovan) – The leader of the Gleanons.
  - Sgt. Krone (voiced by Garry Chalk) – General Nifel's second-in-command.
  - Private Dobson – The Gleanon's computer programmer.

== Episodes ==
No.	Title	Written by	Original release date
1	"A New Beginning"	Jack Olesker	December 4, 1989
Part 1 of 5: Hydron and Flipshot are sent by Master Sebrian to Eternia to find a champion of good to help them in their fight against the Evil Mutants of Denebria led by Flogg. They have a run-in with Andros and are brought to Skeletor who tricks them into thinking that he's a good guy until He-Man shows up. He-Man and Skeletor's fight is taken to Primus where He-Man proves that he's a good guy by fighting off the Evil Mutants while Skeletor forms an alliance with the Evil Mutants
2	"Quest for the Crystals"	Jack Olesker	December 5, 1989
Part 2 of 5: During his fight with He-Man, Slush Head destroys the Trithuseum generators on Primus that prevents its core from overheating. The crystals needed to help power the Trithuseum generators upon its rebuilding can only be found in Gorn City on Denebria. He encounters the trader Meliac who Skeletor uses in his plot to defeat He-Man.
3	"The Heat"	Jack Olesker	December 6, 1989
Part 3 of 5: Slush Head captures the Scientists of Primus as they are working on repairing the Trithuseum generators. Upon learning that they built the shield around Primus, Skeletor sends them to the Quagmi Swamp in Denebria. He-Man, Hydron, and Flipshot head to Denebria to rescue the Scientists and get them back to Primus to repair the Trithuseum generators before Primus' core overheats.
4	"Attack on Onnor"	Jack Olesker	December 7, 1989
Part 4 of 5: He-Man saves Grot's garden from an attack by Hoove and Karatti. Meeting Werban in the Oasis, Skeletor tricks him into lowering Onnor's shield of protection so that Hoove can lead the Evil Mutants to invade Onnor under the cover of a peace talk.
5	"The Ultimate Challenge"	Jack Olesker	December 8, 1989
Part 5 of 5: Following the failed attack on Onnor, Skeletor sends a hologram calling out He-Man to face him on the Cameroon Asteroid. While He-Man and Master Sebrian are sure it is a trap, He-Man goes anyway. While He-Man is facing off against Skeletor, Hoove and the Mutant Shuttle Pods attack Primus' main radar station while Crita, Lizorr, and Karatti capture Master Sebrian and Drissi.
6	"Sword & Staff"	Jack Olesker	December 11, 1989
Skeletor and Quakke find a crystal on Denebria that makes Quakke stronger. Quakke tests his new strength on He-Man, Hydron, and Flipshot during their trip to get oil for the Vasionic Resonator on Denebria and they are saved by Sagitar.
7	"The Pen Is Mightier Than the Sword ... Or Is It?"	Jack Olesker, Dorissa Curry	TBA
Obtaining a painting from a man named Helm, Skeletor and Slush Head stow away on Captain Tipper's ship and heads to a cave in Primus's wastelands and uses a spell to bring the dragon in the painting to life to cause chaos on Primus. He-Man, Hydron, and Flipshot then work to defend Primus from the dragon and other Temperic Oil paintings that Skeletor brings to life.
8	"Glastnost Schmaznost"	Kevin O'Donnell	TBA
Master Sebrian and Adam get a message from the Galactic Council's leader that they will meet on the planet Enoos. The same message meets Skeletor and Flogg as they plan to sway the Galactic Council to their side even by having B.H. fake a hit on Mara that Skeletor will save her from. When this works and the Galactic Council suggests that both planets send delegations, He-Man, Hydron, and Flipshot head to Denebria where they are led into a trap by Slush Head and Lizorr while Skeletor and B.H. secretly have a plan to have an explosive ore burrow into Primus.
9	"The Youngest Hero"	Michael Stokey	TBA
Drissi and Hydron doubt that Caz can join the Primus Space Force. As Flogg leads the Evil Mutants in the next attack, Skeletor and Quakke capture Caz when he tries to stop them and bring him to Denebria where Skeletor uses a special virus to keep him subdued. He will cure Caz of the virus if He-Man surrenders his Power Sword. He-Man comes up with a plan while taking Grot with him.
10	"The Festival of Lights"	Jack Olesker	TBA
The Festival of Lights is a tradition where a solar eclipse happens to the Primian Suns and a celebration will occur after that where Caz states to Adam that they celebrate the return of the Suns. As He-Man will be attending an interstellar rodeo run by Buck Westar that comes to Primus, Skeletor plans to enter Primus by taking over Buck Westar's ship and capture the Galactic Guardians one by one until only He-Man and Sagitar are left.
11	"The Gift"	Jack Olesker	October 3, 1990
Part 1 of 5: At the advice of Skeletor, Flogg contacts Master Sebrian and gives Primus some Zeps as a goodwill gift for peace between Primus and Denebria. Once Primus is filled with Zeps, Skeletor and Flogg activate their remote that turns the Zeps into hideous beasts that attack the Primans. He-Man discovers that the Zeps are actually androids and that there are too many for him to fight all at once.
12	"Skeletor's Victory"	Jack Olesker	October 4, 1990
Part 2 of 5: Primus has been taken over by the Evil Mutants and the Zeps. As He-Man and Mara have the key to the shield around Primus, Skeletor has captured Master Sebrian, Hydron, and Flipshot and sends B.H., Quakke, and Staghorn to find He-Man. Meanwhile, the Scientists of Primus work to find what makes the Zeps assume their monstrous forms.
13	"He-Man in Exile"	Jack Olesker	October 5, 1990
Part 3 of 5: At the advice of Flogg, Quakke puts up bounty posters for He-Man's capture as the Evil Mutants and the Zeps look for him. He-Man frees some prisoners from Slush Head as they join up in his resistance. When Skeletor threatens a village, He-Man offers to surrender if they spare the village.
14	"The Seeds of Resistance"	Jack Olesker	October 8, 1990
Part 4 of 5: As the Scientists of Primus work on a way to deactivate the Zeps, Adam and Mara go to where Master Sebrian, Hydron, and Flipshot are being held and free them despite interference by Crita, Slush Head, and the Mutant Troopers. Afterwards, He-Man and Master Sebrian provide a diversion for Skeletor while Mara, Hydron, and Flipshot retake the Starship Eternia.
15	"The Battle for Levitan"	Jack Olesker	TBA
Part 5 of 5: Skeletor threatens to destroy Levitan if He-Man doesn't surrender. He-Man disguises himself as a Mutant Trooper to get close to Levitan while having a plan to retake Levitan and all of Primus with the help of the Galactic Guardians and the resistance. Though Skeletor will destroy Levitan anyway even if He-Man surrenders.
16	"Crack in the World"	Tony Zalewski	TBA
Tricking the Scientists of Primus with an award that will be presented at a space station, Skeletor and Flogg use a robot to have them decode the formula for Energon. This substance is used to melt and destroy planets and the award given to them is filled with it. The only thing that can destroy Energon is a power that is as evil as Energon.
17	"Escape from Gaolotia"	Misty Taggart	TBA
The Evil Mutants have taken over the prison ship Gaolotia. When Caz and Drissi take an Astrosub and get baited to Gaolotia, Skeletor contacts He-Man telling him to come rescue them at Gaolotia. The Sorceress of Castle Grayskull contacts He-Man stating that Skeletor is having Gaolotia placed in the path of the comet Xenon.
18	"He-Man Mutant"	Francis Moss and Ted Pedersen	TBA
After the Galactic Guardians capture Quakke and B.H., the Scientists of Primus create a machine called the Mutator that can turn any human into a mutant. When it is tested on He-Man so that he can spy on Skeletor, it changes more than his appearance as destroys the Mutator and rescues Quake and B.H. Not realizing that the mutant is a transformed He-Man, Skeletor names him Cruncher and takes him in storming the Inner Council's chambers.
19	"Juggernaut"	Jim Carlson and Terrence McDonnell	TBA
A spaceship carrying a little girl arrives on Primus. He-Man and the Galactic Guardians are unaware that the little girl is actually a dangerous cyborg used by Skeletor in his plot to bring down the shield surrounding Primus.
20	"Fading Star"	Steven J. Fisher	TBA
The Galactic Guardians investigate a destroyed ship orbiting Primus and find a Hibernation Capsule containing Dukan who is one of the greatest heroes in Primus' past. Skeletor challenges Dukan to a duel in an abandoned city on Denebria. Suspecting trouble, He-Man, Hydron, and Flipshot secretly follow Dukan.
21	"Skeletor's Revenge"	David Bennett Carren and J. Larry Carroll	TBA
The Scientists of Primus create a Super Computer that would link all machines on Primus and the planetary shield. An exiled computer hacker named Mikros collaborates with Skeletor to place a computer virus called the Argazoid into the Super Computer. To combat the Argazoid, the Scientists of Primus use a shrink ray to shrink He-Man, Artilla, Gepple, and Alcon into the computer in order to keep Argazoid from reaching the Vasionic Resonator so that the Evil Mutants can invade.
22	"The Mind Lens"	Doug Molitor	TBA
Skeletor uses the Mind Lens to influence the human will. After causing damage on Primus, Skeletor wants to use the Mind Lens on He-Man.
23	"Adam's Adventure"	Michael Reaves and Brynne Stephens	TBA
Skeletor uses a brainwave detector to help him find He-Man. When Skeletor abducts a spaceship, He-Man is nowhere to be found.
24	"Collision Course"	John Fox	TBA
Skeletor steals the plans for a gravity generator and builds one of his own. He plans to use it to push Primus out of its orbit where its temperature change threatens all life on Primus.
25	"Planet of Junk"	Francis Moss	TBA
Using an image projector found on an asteroid, Skeletor disguises himself and the Evil Mutants as Professor Galactica's Interstellar Circus. They use this cover to kidnap the Scientists of Primus in order to have them work on the weapons found on the asteroid.
26	"Sanctuary"	Richard Merwin	TBA
The Galactic Guardians destroy Flogg's new giant laser canon, but it's wreck emits a green gas that threatens the shield around the planet Primus. Skeletor soon produces more of the gas to weaken Primus and even He-Man's sword is affected.
27	"Council of Clones"	Ted Pedersen and Francis Moss	TBA
Skeletor and Flogg have Primus' planetary shield bombed with everything they got. He places a special super-computer on a shuttle pod which He-Man obtains as the Scientists of Primus discover that it can produce clones. When the Scientists of Primus use it to clone the Inner Council members so that they can rest, Skeletor activates the super-computer where the clones work to disable the planetary shield.
28	"Cold Freeze"	Kevin O'Donnell	TBA
Primus' sun withdraws out of regeneration behind a shell. This causes an ice age to break out as He-Man works to preserve all life on Primus.
29	"He-Caz"	Steven J. Fisher	TBA
After Caz injures his leg pretending to be a Galactic Guardian, the Scientists of Primus give him a high-tech Medi-Suit powered by energy crystals that can help him move around until his leg is fully healed. This Medi-Suit gives Caz some abilities. Knowing that the Scientis of Primus put too many energy crystals in it, Master Sebrian advises He-Man to stop Caz before he gets hurt. Unfortunately Skeletor lures Caz to a trap on the planet Dectis causing He-Man, Sagitar, and Tuskador to go rescue him.
30	"Slaves to the Machine"	Ted Pedersen and Francis Moss	TBA
He-Man and Skeletor arrive on the planet Machina where its inhabitants are controlled by machines. While He-Man joins a resistance and fights for the independence of Machina's inhabitants, Skeletor has other plans.
31	"The Galactic Guardians"	Jack Olesker	TBA
Following a recent fight, the Galactic Guardians reminisce about past battles. In a flashback, it is shown that a transporter ship carrying poison gas was blown off course as Hydron and Flipshot train the Galactic Guardians' new recruits Artilla, Spinwit, Tuskador, and the previously-unknown Sagitar. Skeletor plans to destroy the ship with the Galactic Guardians still on board.
32	"The Siege of Serus"	Jack Olesker	TBA
An asteroid gets passed Primus' planetary shield. As the lasers from the Starship Eternia doesn't phase it, He-Man heads out to intercept it and deflects it into the sea. Master Sebrian discovers that the asteroid is causing trouble for the underwater city of Serus where Hydron is from. Learning form Hydron's sister Aquata about Serus' flooding, the Galactic Guardians work to seal the crack. Soon, they must deal with the living asteroid Keto who plans to drain Primus of its energy.
33	"The Children's Planet"	Misty Taggart	TBA
The Scientists of Primus inform Master Sebrian that a deadly gas called the Black Omega has the power to destroy Primus' planetary shield and is located on Omega 4, a frozen planet at the edge of the Tri-Solar Galaxy. Master Sebrian agrees with the Scientists' suggestions to have He-Man destroy the planet with the Black Omega. When He-Man, Spinwit, and Tuskador on Omega 4, he discovers that there are some inhabitants on Omega 4 enslaved by the Mutant Maxus and his two-headed servant named Zark who were exiled there by Skeletor. Maxus and Zark are using the slaves to harvest the Black Omega in order to get on Skeletor's good side.
34	"Zone of Darkness"	Jim Carlson and Terrence McDonnell	TBA
Master Sebrian and Mara crash land in a remote area of Denebria. When He-Man arrives on Denebria to save them, he encounters some friendly Mutants who claim that they were once humans.
35	"Once Upon a Time"	Misty Taggart	TBA
He-Man is homesick for Eternia as the Sorceress of Castle Grayskull to send Teela to visit him. Meanwhile, Skeletor obtains a volume of a spellbook called the Encyclopedia of Evil and plans to obtain the entire collection with the help of Flogg, B.H., and Quakke while also taking Grot as a hostage.
36	"A Plague on Primus"	David Bennett Carren and J. Larry Carroll	TBA
Skeletor gets his hands on some anxiety gas which causes any males exposed to it to become trembling cowards and has an opposite on females. Now it is up to the females to defend Primus from the Evil Mutants.
37	"The Test of Time"	Richard Merwin	TBA
The city of Levitan is in need of more berillium to run its generators. Master Sebrian's old friend Treybius travels to Primus to deliver the berillium where his ship the Star Trader is intercepted by the Evil Mutants. After being rescued by the Galactic Guardians, Treybius accompanies He-Man, Master Sebrian, and the Galactic Guardians to Denebria to reclaim the Star Trader and get the berillium before Levitan crashes to the ground.
38	"Four Ways to Sundown"	Jack Olesker	TBA
The Galactic Guardians and the Evil Mutants remember their recent battle in the Quagmi Swamps. Each side recaps what happened during the battle.
39	"The Sheriff of Gorn City"	Jack Olesker	TBA
In order to bring law and order to Gorn City, Flogg takes Skeletor's suggestion to appoint Flipshot as its new sheriff so that Skeletor can spring a trap for He-Man. Flipshot and Spinwit gain the support of Gorn City's mayor Seeka who has no vendetta against Primus. As Skeletor and the ex-mayor Korac orchestrate events to lure Tyroc and the Ugly Bunch to face He-Man by allowing Byloc to be captured, He-Man gains the assistance of Meliac to help defeat them.
40	"The New Wizard in Town"	Jack Olesker	TBA
A large meeting of magic users is occurring on Primus. The Opaque magician Ramlin is in attendance as he has a plan to steal everyone's magic.
41	"The Nemesis Within"	Sean Roche	TBA
During an event on Primus where different inventions are being shown off, Skeletor has Grr steal a cloning device. When He-Man works to reclaim the device, the Evil Mutants obtain his DNA sample which Skeletor uses to create a clone he calls "He-Slave" which he plans to use to defeat He-Man.
42	"He-Fan"	Jim Carlson and Terrence McDonnell	TBA
He-Man gets a big fan in the form of an old lady named Melindra. When the Galactic Guardians go on a mission, they are unaware that Melindra has stowed away on the Starship Eternia.
43	"The Dream Zone"	Michael Reaves	TBA
Skeletor uses an invention to get into the Dream Zone. When he attacks the internal device that maintains the concentrated subconscious that helps to protect Primus, He-Man must enter the Dream Zone to confront Skeletor.
44	"Brain Drain"	Francis Moss and Ted Pedersen	TBA
Skeletor uses an intelligence amplifier given to him by Korac to enhance the intelligence of the Evil Mutants. Even when they succeed in overcoming He-Man, the Evil Mutants start being intellectually superior to Skeletor.
45	"You're in the Army Now"	Francis Moss and Ted Pedersen	TBA
Adam is on trial for running away during an attack by the Evil Mutants and a supposed act of treachery when he was secretly transforming into He-Man with Werban prosecuting him. Despite Master Sebrian attempting to speak on Adam's behalf, Adam is found guilty by Werban and is to be shipped off to the Prison Moon for the next 18 Telks. Meanwhile, Skeletor and Flogg enlist their inside person to plant a disruption bomb at the Titus Observatory to serve as a diversion for the Evil Mutants' next attack.
46	"No Easy Way"	Jack Olesker	TBA
While on a reconnaissance mission to Primus' moon, He-Man and the Scientists of Primus discover a plant species that is harmful to the Mutants of Denebria. He-Man harvests the plants and brings them to Primus in hopes that it can keep away the Evil Mutants.
47	"The Guns of Nordor"	Jack Olesker	TBA
Flogg has obtained some new laser cannons with their range being a threat to Primus. Now He-Man and the Galactic Guardians must infiltrate Nordor and destroy the cannons before it can be used on Primus.
48	"The Bride of Slushhead"	Jack Olesker	TBA
A bug on the Starship Eternia causes it to land on Denebria. Sagitar rescues a Mutant named Felca who is the future bride of Slush Head. Discovering that Sagitar rescued Felca, Slush Head agrees to help the Galactic Guardians get a new part for the Starship Eternia. Flogg finds out that Slush Head invited the Galactic Guardians to his wedding as Skeletor sees this as an opportunity to get rid of them once and for all.
49	"Dreadator"	Jack Olesker	TBA
An unbeatable gladiator champion named Dreadator is persuaded by Skeletor to fight He-Man. To prove that he is the best warrior in the universe, Dreadtor challenges He-Man to a duel.
50	"Mutiny on the Mothership"	Jack Olesker	TBA
The Mutant Mothership is caught in a space storm. Displeased with Flogg's decisions, Staghorn persuades B.H. and Quakke into starting a mutiny.
51	"Rock to the Future"	Jack Olesker	TBA
Slush Head and Staghorn discover a 1980s rock star on a desolate planet. When they take the rock star to Denebria to meet their fellow Mutants, Skeletor plans to use the rock star in his plot to destroy He-Man.
52	"The Running of the Herd"	Jack Olesker	TBA
After helping to accompany Hydron, Flipshot and Gepple to study the solar flares, He-Man learns that Sagitar's strange behavior comes from the Running of the Herd vision as He-Man allows the group to head to Equinos to celebrate the Horse Lords' heritage or else perish. Flogg plans to be present at the Running of the Herd with Skeletor, Slush Head, Staghorn, and the Mutant Troopers as a way to target Sagitar while threatening the planet's destruction to General Nekor.
53	"Balance of Power"	Jack Olesker	TBA
He-Man, Hydron, Flipshot, Sagitar, and Mara head to the planet Nekron to negotiate peace between the Mytes led by President Pell and the Gleanons led by General Nifel. They come to the aid of the Mytes when Crita collaborates with General Nifel in capturing President Pell in order to access the Transium Mines and obtain enough to make weapons for the Evil Mutants.
54	"The Tornadoes of Zil"	Leon Charles	TBA
Mara contacts Master Sebrian to inform him of a radio signal from the planet Zil that has been uninhabitable due to the storms there. He-Man and Spinwit head to Zil where they meet their inhabitants who would like Spinwit to save them due to the crystals for their Tornado Machines are almost out of power. Meanwhile, Skeletor takes B.H. and Quakke with him to attack Zil.
55	"The Taking of Levitan"	Jack Olesker	TBA
President Pell sends his ambassador Bimo to Primus to showcase his robot Kog. Upon being contacted by General Nifel and Crita, Skeletor and Flogg plan to reprogram Kog to destroy Levitan where they have the Gleanons' programmer Private Dobson do the job. Upon Bimo and Kog's arrival, Optikk activates Kog to attack as he, Staghorn, Hoove, Slush Head, B.H., and Quakke begin their attack on Levitan.
56	"Save Our City"	Jack Olesker	TBA
The Mytes and the Gleanons are still at each other. General Nifel and Crita have a plan to subjugate the Mytes. Now He-Man and Mara must help the Mytes and thwart the Gleanons' plot.
57	"The Power of the Good and the Way of the Magic"	Jack Olesker	TBA
To cut off the supplies to Primus, Skeletor and Flogg hatch a plan to conquer the planets in the Tri-Solar Galaxy. The planet Danzig is their first stop as He-Man, Flipshot, and Ambassador Bimo come to Danzig's defense.
58	"Queen's Gambit"	Jack Olesker	TBA
Skeletor causes a meteor to head to Primus while Crita starts a large offensive against the Mytes. With He-Man busy dealing with the meteor, Mara is on her own defending the Mytes from Crita and General Nifel.
59	"There's Gems in Them Hills"	Jack Olesker	TBA
Skeletor and Korac free some mercenaries and promises them a reward if they terrorize Primus. When He-Man tries to infiltrate them and gets caught, Ambassador Bimo becomes his unlikely rescuer.
60	"The Call to the Games"	Jack Olesker	TBA
The Galactic Guardians and the Evil Mutants get involved with a battle between two gigantic stars. When the battle is finished, both parties must fight each other.
61	"The Blacksmith of Crelus"	Jack Olesker	TBA
Part 1 of 5: He-Man and the Galactic Guardians head to the planet Crelus to find the blacksmith Yolt to make weapons for the upcoming Games. Though Skeletor and Flogg have a plan to make Crelus make weapons for them and fool him into thinking that the Galactic Guardians are the bad guys.
62	"A Time to Leave"	Jack Olesker	TBA
Part 2 of 5: The Galactic Guardians are in need of a trainer for the upcoming mutant invasion. When they arrive on the planet Nekron, they encounter the shady and unusually large Myte named Wulk who trains them until it comes to a certain maze where he has plans of his own that involves working Skeletor to take revenge on the Mytes.
63	"The Games"	Jack Olesker	TBA
Part 3 of 5: The Galactic Guardians and the Evil Mutants compete against each other in the Games. While the Evil Mutants win the first round thanks to some trickery, the Galactic Guardians work to turn the tide against them.
64	"Flogg's Revenge"	Jack Olesker	TBA
Part 4 of 5: He-Man and the Galactic Guardians celebrate their victory in the Games. After failing to blow up the Great Hall with a stolen astrosub that has a Transium Ore, Skeletor and Flogg take hostages with the condition of their release is that He-Man must face Skeletor in the Arena.
65	"The Final Invasion"	Jack Olesker	December 7, 1990
Part 5 of 5: In light of the Galactic Guardians' latest victory, Flogg leads the Evil Mutants and the entire Denebrian forces in their final battle against Primus.

== Cast ==
- Don Brown - Hydron, Gepple, Optikk, Quakke, Kayo, Vizar, Werban
- Garry Chalk - He-Man, Artilla, Alcon, Andros (in "A New Beginning"), President Pell (in "Balance of Power," and "The Taking of Levitan"), Sgt. Krone (in "Balance of Power," "The Taking of Levitan," and "A Time to Leave"), Gross
- Ted Cole - Spinwit, Slush Head, Karatti, Staghorn, Gleep, Vice-president Etor (in "Balance of Power")
- Tracy Eisner - Drissi
- Mark Hildreth - Caz
- Antony Holland - Master Sebrian
- Campbell Lane - Skeletor, Sagitar
- Scott McNeil - Flipshot, Butthead, Krex, Captain Zang
- Doug Parker - Prince Adam, Hoove, Meldoc
- Alvin Sanders - Flogg, Tuskador
- Venus Terzo - Crita, Mara, Sorceress of Castle Grayskull

=== Additional voices ===
- Long John Baldry - Treylus (in "The Test of Time")
- Michael Donovan - General Nifel
- Cathy Weseluck - Teela (in "Once Upon a Time")

== Crew ==
- Susan Blu - Voice Director
- Jean Chalopin- Story Editor/Executive Producer

== Minicomics ==
In the New Adventures mini-comics packaged with the toys, the story is slightly different: when Prince Adam and Skeletor travel to Primus, Adam becomes He-Man in front of Skeletor, revealing his secret identity and giving up the identity of Prince Adam to remain permanently as He-Man. The "explosion" from the transformation damages Skeletor and he has to become a cyborg in order to survive. Also in the comics, Skeletor does not fake allegiance to Flogg. Instead, he defeats Flogg and assumes full command of the Evil Mutants.

The element of the transformation from Adam to He-Man is retained from the first cartoon series, as the makers felt it would be unwise to abandon it given that the transformation sequence had been one of the most popular elements of the original series. However, in this series, one word in the transformation line is different - instead of "By the power of Grayskull...I have the power!", he says "By the power of Eternia...I have the power!"

== Reception ==
The show has been compared to the original series, with most reviews noting a dramatic shift in tone, creating a sense of discontinuity compared to the original. The quality of the animation is considered superior, but the character designs have been described as bland. Just like He-Man and the Masters of the Universe it has PSAs at the end of each episode.

== DVD releases ==
BCI Eclipse LLC (under its Ink & Paint classic animation entertainment brand) (under license from Entertainment Rights) released The New Adventures of He-Man on DVD in Region 1 in two volume sets in 2006/2007. Each episode on BCI Ink & Paint's DVD releases of The New Adventures of He-Man (AKA He-Man in Space by He-Man fans) was uncut and digitally re-mastered for optimum audio and video quality and presented in its original broadcast presentation and story continuity order, as well as extensive bonus features.

As of 2009, this release has been discontinued and is out of print as BCI Eclipse has ceased operations.

To commemorate the 30th anniversary He-Man and the Masters of the Universe brand, Mill Creek Entertainment released the 30th Anniversary Commemorative Collection of He-Man and the Masters of the Universe DVD in December 2012. The 22-disc features all 130 episodes of the 1983 series, 20 fan-favorite episodes of the 1990 series, as well as all 39 episodes of the 2002 series.

DVD name	Ep #	Release date
The New Adventures of He-Man: Volume 1	33	December 26, 2006
The New Adventures of He-Man: Volume 2	32	March 27, 2007
