= Campbell Lane =

Canadian actor (1935–2014)

- Born: Campbell Francis Lane; July 15, 1935
- Died: January 30, 2014 (aged 78)
- Other names: Campbell Lan; Cam Lane
- Occupation: Actor
- Years active: 1973–2010
- Spouse: Diane Lane

Campbell Francis Lane (July 15, 1935 – January 30, 2014) was a Canadian actor who primarily did his work in Vancouver. He appeared in many television shows produced there, and was also a voice over artist. He narrated the 1999 video game Homeworld.

== Death ==
Campbell Lane died on January 30, 2014, from lung cancer, at the age of 78.

== Filmography ==
=== Film roles ===
- A Man, a Woman and a Bank (1979) - Citation Cop
- Finders Keepers (1984) - Stanton-Gilmore
- Certain Fury (1985) - Wino
- The Journey of Natty Gann (1985) - Chicago Moderator
- Malone (1987) - Tom Riggs
- Beyond the Stars (1989) - Alex Stamas
- Cafe Romeo (1991) - Enzo
- Needful Things (1993) - Frank Jewett
- Cool Runnings (1993) - Shindler
- Look Who's Talking Now (1993) - Mollie's Dad
- Ski School 2 (1994) - Pastor
- Power Play (1994) - Harold Bloom
- The Final Cut (1995) - Kulkonne
- Mr. Magoo (1997) - (uncredited)
- Mr. Rice's Secret (1999) - Mr. Death
- The Duke (1999) - Nutswager
- MVP: Most Valuable Primate (2000) - Melvin
- 3000 Miles to Graceland (2001) - Billy
- Along Came a Spider (2001) - Mathias
- Kevin of the North (2001) - Starter
- Dreamcatcher (2003) - Old Man Gosselin
- Scary Movie 4 (2006) - Amos
- Unnatural & Accidental (2006) - Rebecca's Father
- Gray Matters (2006) - Harry
- Stargate: Continuum (2008, Video) - Older man

=== Television roles ===
- The X-Files (1994–1996) - Committee Chairman / Calusari Elder / Hohman's Father
- Nick Fury: Agent of S.H.I.E.L.D. (1998, TV Movie) - Baron Wolfgang von Strucker
- First Wave (2000, Episode: "Rubicon") - Uncle Harry
- Beyond Belief: Fact or Fiction (2002) - John August (segment "The Cigar Box")
- Masters of Horror (2005) - Masurewicz
- His and Her Christmas (2005, TV Movie) - Harold Lane
- Home by Christmas (2006, TV Movie) - Max Stern
- Battlestar Galactica: Razor (2007, TV Movie) - Cylon First Hybrid

=== Voice roles ===
- Adventures of Mowgli (1973) - Baloo (English version, narrator)
- Maison Ikkoku (1986, TV Series) - Mr. Ichinose
- The New Adventures of He-Man (1990–1991, TV Series) - Skeletor
- Mega Man: Upon a Star (1993, TV Series) - Mr. Kobayashi
- Animated Classic Showcase (1993, Film Roman's)
- Mobile Suit Gundam Wing (English dub) (1995–1996, TV Series) - Narrator
- Key the Metal Idol (1996–1997, TV Series) - Aoi / 'B'
- The Rainbow Fish (1997) - Barracuda
- Dazzle the Dinosaur (1997) - Dragonsaurus
- Stories From My Childhood (1998, TV Series)
- RoboCop: Alpha Commando (1998–1999, TV Series) - Alpha Prime (Narrator)
- Beast Wars (1998–1999, TV Series) - Rampage
- Fat Dog Mendoza (1998-2000) - Mr. Johnson
- Sherlock Holmes in the 22nd Century (1999–2001, TV Series) - The Sussex Vampire
- Action Man (2000–2001, TV Series) - Dr. X
- Frank Was a Monster Who Wanted to Dance (2001) - Narrator
- Ultimate Book of Spells (2001–2002, TV Series)
- X-Men: Evolution (2001–2003, TV Series) - Mastermind / Professor Thorton
- Beyond Belief: Fact or Fiction (Took over for Don LaFontaine in 2002, TV Series) - John August (segment "The Cigar Box") / Self - Announcer

=== Video game roles ===
- Transformers: Beast Wars Transmetals (1999) - Rampage
- Homeworld (1999) - Narrator
- Homeworld: Cataclysm (2000) - Narrator
- Frogger Beyond (2002) - Rainforest Elder
- Homeworld 2 (2003) - Narrator
