= Shuki Levy =

American composer

- שוקי לוי
- Born: June 3, 1947 (age 79); Jaffa, British Mandate of Palestine
- Spouse(s): Deborah Shelton (m. 1977, divorced) Tori Avey
- Children: 2

Shuki Levy (Hebrew: שוקי לוי; born June 3, 1947) is an Israeli-American music composer and television producer. Levy created soundtrack compositions for children's television programs of the 1980s, such as The Real Ghostbusters, Inspector Gadget, The Mysterious Cities of Gold, M.A.S.K., Dinosaucers, He-Man and the Masters of the Universe, She-Ra: Princess of Power, and Jayce and the Wheeled Warriors. In the 1990s, he worked on the Power Rangers franchise, Digimon: Digital Monsters, Masked Rider, VR Troopers, and Big Bad Beetleborgs. He has also written and directed episodes for some these television shows, and directed a few films, such as Perfect Victims (1988) and Blind Vision (1991). He was also part of the musical duo Shuky & Aviva (alternatively Shuki & Aviva), with his partner Aviva Paz.

== Early life ==
Levy was born in Jaffa, British Mandate of Palestine. His father was an Ashkenazi Jew originally from Russia, and his mother of Sephardi Jewish origin.

His career began as a singer and music performer, playing in various clubs around Tel Aviv. He also appeared in the musical Hair.

== Career ==
=== Shuky & Aviva ===
During the 1970s, Levy performed in France and Germany with Aviva Paz as the duo "Shuki & Aviva" or "Shuky and Aviva". Paz was also born in the British Mandate of Palestine, and four years older than him. Together they scored a hit single throughout Europe called "Signorina - Concertina" which sold two million copies. He also appeared with her on several other releases and music videos. In 1975, Shuki & Aviva sung "You and Me and Two Dreams", which competed as one of the possible German entries during the preliminary rounds of the 1975 Eurovision Song Contest. Levy later composed "Halayla", the Israeli entry to the 1981 Eurovision Song Contest.

=== Saban Entertainment ===
While living in Paris, he met businessman and musician Haim Saban, with the two becoming friends and collaborators. In an interview, Levy recalled "Haim said, 'We'll be co-composer. You do the composing, I'll do the deals.' I figured, 'Great. Brothers.' That was the last business conversation we had for many years. We were partners. We never had a written agreement. It was all verbal." They eventually moved to Los Angeles and founded Saban Entertainment, a production company responsible for animated shows and Japanese adaptions, such as Digimon, X-Men: The Animated Series, Spider-Man: The Animated Series, and Power Rangers. The company was sold to The Walt Disney Company by the end of 2001.

During the 1980s and 1990s, he composed television music; according to BMI's music publishing database, he has written a combined total of 4,210 themes, background scores and songs. In a 1998 investigation by The Hollywood Reporter, it was alleged that many of these compositions were ghostwritten by other composers, in order for Levy and Haim Saban to gain control of all publishing rights and music royalty revenue.

=== Post-Saban Entertainment projects ===
The first project Levy worked on following the dissolution of Saban Entertainment was Itty Bitty HeartBeats, a 2003 animated children's DVD. In 2009, he also directed and composed music for the live action film Aussie and Ted's Great Adventure. The film was co-written with his wife Tori Avey, and featured his daughter Jordan in one of the roles.

== Personal life ==
In 1977, Levy was married to Miss USA 1970 and actress Deborah Shelton (Dallas), with whom he has a daughter. Shelton went on to appear in the 1982 horror film Blood Tide, which was one of the first film and television projects Levy composed for. He was also in a relationship with television actress Sarah Brown (General Hospital), with whom he has a second daughter. When they started dating in 1994, Brown was only 19 years old and 27 years younger than Levy. At that point, he was also secretly engaged to another actress named Shell Danielson, and still married to Shelton. Levy remained in a secret relationship with Danielson even after Brown moved in with him, and also remained married to Shelton until early 2000, nearly two years after Brown's daughter was born. Brown and Levy split in 2000, with Brown accusing him of spying on her over the next few years. Levy is currently married to food blogger Tori Avey, whom he met in the early 2000s. Levy has owned properties in both California and Miami.

== Musical compositions ==
Shuki Levy is credited as a composer on the following works:

=== Musicals ===
- 2007. Imagine This

=== TV series ===
- 1975. Time Bokan
- 1975. Steel Jeeg
- 1980. Heathcliff
- 1981. Ulysses 31
- 1981. Spider-Woman (French and Italian dubs)
- 1982. The Mysterious Cities of Gold
- 1982. X-Bomber (French dub)
- 1982. Urusei Yatsura (Italian dub)
- 1983. Saturday Supercade
- 1983. He-Man and the Masters of the Universe
- 1983. The Littles
- 1983. Inspector Gadget
- 1983. Mister T
- 1984. Photon
- 1984. The Get Along Gang
- 1984. Kidd Video
- 1984. Pole Position
- 1984. Going Bananas
- 1985. It's Punky Brewster
- 1985. Kissyfur
- 1985. Jayce and the Wheeled Warriors
- 1985. Rainbow Brite
- 1985. She-Ra: Princess of Power
- 1985. M.A.S.K.
- 1986. Popples
- 1986. Rambo: The Force of Freedom
- 1986. The Real Ghostbusters
- 1986. Zoobilee Zoo
- 1986. Dennis the Menace
- 1987. Starcom: The U.S. Space Force
- 1987. Lady Lovely Locks
- 1987. Diplodo
- 1987. Maple Town
- 1987. Dinosaucers
- 1987. The New Archies
- 1987. Maxie's World
- 1987. Sylvanian Families
- 1987. Beverly Hills Teens
- 1987. ALF: The Animated Series
- 1987. Hello Kitty's Furry Tale Theater
- 1988. Hey Vern, It's Ernest!
- 1988. RoboCop
- 1988. COPS
- 1988. Noozles
- 1988. ALF Tales
- 1989. Metalder (French Dub)
- 1989. Dragon Warrior
- 1989. Captain N: The Game Master
- 1989. Ring Raiders
- 1989. The Karate Kid
- 1989. Camp Candy
- 1989. The Super Mario Bros. Super Show!
- 1989. Grimm's Fairy Tale Classics
- 1989. The Legend of Zelda
- 1989. The New Adventures of He-Man
- 1990. Saban's Adventures of the Little Mermaid
- 1990. Lucky Luke
- 1990. Attack of the Killer Tomatoes
- 1990. Video Power
- 1991. Space Cats
- 1991. Maya the Bee
- 1991. Little Shop
- 1991. Samurai Pizza Cats
- 1991. Rock 'n Cop (German and Swedish dub of Future Police Urashiman — no English version was released)
- 1992. X-Men: The Animated Series
- 1992. King Arthur and the Knights of Justice
- 1992. Jin Jin and the Panda Patrol
- 1992. Pinocchio: The Series
- 1993. Journey to the Heart of the World
- 1993. Mighty Morphin Power Rangers
- 1993. Mad Scientist Toon Club
- 1993. Walter Melon
- 1994. BattleTech: The Animated Series
- 1994. The Adventures of Hutch the Honeybee
- 1994. Teknoman (dubbed version of Tekkaman Blade)
- 1994. Creepy Crawlers
- 1994. Sweet Valley High
- 1994. Spider-Man: The Animated Series
- 1994. VR Troopers
- 1995. Space Strikers
- 1995. Masked Rider
- 1995. Iznogoud
- 1995. Space Strikers
- 1995. Tenko and the Guardians of the Magic
- 1996. Dragon Ball Z (Funimation/Ocean Studios/Saban dub of the first 53 episodes)
- 1996. Eagle Riders (dubbed version of Gatchaman II and Gatchaman Fighter)
- 1996. Power Rangers Zeo
- 1996. The Mouse and the Monster
- 1996. Bureau of Alien Detectors
- 1996. The Incredible Hulk
- 1996. Little Mouse on the Prairie
- 1996. Big Bad Beetleborgs
- 1997. Ninja Turtles: The Next Mutation
- 1997. Breaker High
- 1997. Saban's Adventures of Oliver Twist
- 1997. Super Pig
- 1997. Power Rangers Turbo
- 1997. The Adventures of Tom Sawyer
- 1997. Huckleberry no Bōken
- 1998. Monster Farm
- 1998. Silver Surfer
- 1998. Power Rangers in Space
- 1998. The Secret Files of the Spy Dogs
- 1999. Boyzopolis
- 1999. Great Pretenders
- 1999. Girlzopolis
- 1999. Spider-Man Unlimited
- 1999. Power Rangers Lost Galaxy
- 1999. Digimon: Digital Monsters
- 1999. The Avengers: United They Stand
- 2000. Action Man
- 2000. Dinozaurs
- 2000. House of Pop
- 2000. Power Rangers Lightspeed Rescue
- 2000. The Vision of Escaflowne
- 2000. NASCAR Racers
- 2000. Pigs Next Door
- 2000. Real Scary Stories
- 2000. Shinzo
- 2001. Jason and the Heroes of Mount Olympus
- 2001. Living with Lionel
- 2001. Moolah Beach
- 2001. Mon Colle Knights
- 2001. Power Rangers Time Force
- 2001. State of Grace
- 2001. Total Access 24/7
- 2001. Transformers: Robots in Disguise

=== TV ===
- 1985. He-Man & She-Ra: A Christmas Special
- 1987. Bay Coven
- 1992. Revenge on the Highway
- 1993. Under Investigation
- 1994. Guns of Honor
- 1994. Honor Thy Father and Mother: The True Story of the Menendez Murders
- 1994. Blindfold: Acts of Obsession
- 1997. Dragon Ball Z: The Tree of Might (Funimation/Ocean Studios/Saban dub which edited the original film into three television episodes)
- 2000. Final Ascent

=== Videos ===
- 1980. Goldwing
- 1985. Punky Brewster: More For Your Punky
- 1986. My Favorite Fairy Tales
- 1989. Little Golden Book Land
- 1991. Sugar & Spice: Snow White
- 1991. Sugar & Spice: Heidi
- 1991. Sugar & Spice: Cinderella
- 1991. Sugar & Spice: Alice in Wonderland
- 1991. Sugar & Spice: The Wizard of Oz
- 2003. Itty Bitty Heartbeats

=== Films ===
- 1981. Dawn of the Mummy
- 1982. Blood Tide
- 1983. Les Dalton En Cavale
- 1984. The Secret of the Selenites
- 1984. Fatal Games
- 1985. Here Come the Littles
- 1985. The Secret of the Sword
- 1985. Rainbow Brite and the Star Stealer
- 1986. Heathcliff: The Movie
- 1987. Barbie and the Sensations: Rockin' Back to Earth
- 1987. Barbie and the Rockers: Out of This World
- 1988. Perfect Victims
- 1989. Trapper Country War
- 1992. Prey of the Chameleon
- 1992. Blind Vision
- 1992. Round Trip to Heaven
- 1995. Mighty Morphin Power Rangers: The Movie
- 1996. Susie Q
- 1998. Rusty: A Dog's Tale
- 2000. Digimon: The Movie

== Screenwriting credits ==
=== Television ===
- Wolf Rock TV (1984)
- Kidd Video (1985)
- Mighty Morphin Power Rangers (1993–1996)
- Masked Rider (1995)
- Big Bad Beetleborgs (1996)
- Power Rangers Zeo (1996)
- Power Rangers Turbo (1997)

=== Film ===
- Perfect Victims (1988)
- Blind Vision (1992)
- Round Trip to Heaven (1992)
- Someone to Die For (1995)
- Susie Q (1996)
- Turbo: A Power Rangers Movie (1997)
- Exception to the Rule (1997)
- Rusty: A Dog's Tale (1998)
- Aussie and Ted's Great Adventure (2009)

== Director ==
=== Television ===
- Mighty Morphin Power Rangers (1993–1995)
- VR Troopers (1994)
- Masked Rider (1995)
- Big Bad Beetleborgs (1996)
- Power Rangers Turbo (1997)

=== Film ===
- Perfect Victims (1988)
- Blind Vision (1992)
- Turbo: A Power Rangers Movie (1997)
- Rusty: A Dog's Tale (1998)
- Aussie and Ted's Great Adventure (2009)

== Discography ==
(As part of duo Shuky & Aviva)

=== Albums ===
- Love Is Like (1974)
- Shuky & Aviva (1976)
- Shuky & Aviva Album N°2 (1977)

Compilation albums

- The Very Best of Shuki & Aviva (1974)
- The Hits Collection (1990)
- Best of Shuky & Aviva (2002)
- Shuky & Aviva (4xCD) (2013)

=== Singles ===
- "L' amour c' est la musique de la vie" (1972)
- "Signorina Concertina"/"I'll Never Let You Go" (1972)
- "Here Comes Summertime" (1972)
- "When I'm Dreaming" (1973)
- "Sixteen Brothers"/"On My Own" (1973)
- "Listen to the Children"/"Ecoutez les enfants" (1973)
- "Ca ne suffit pas"/"C'est trop tard" (1973)
- "Did I ever say goodbye"/"Roller Coaster" (1974)
- "Did I Hear You Say Good-Bye" (1974)
- "Bye, Bye, a bientôt"/Des dimanches d'amour" (1975)
- "Bye Bye Ciao My Love" (1975)
- "Je t'aime un peu trop" (1975)
- "Prends ma chemise" (1976)
- "Viens que je t'embrasse"/"La separation" (1976)
- "Fête d'amour"/Ils ne mont parlé que de toi" (1976)
- "Comme Si" (The Air That I Breath) (1976)
- "Hotel California"/"S'aimer comme on s'aime" (1977)
- "Mais bien sur je t'aime"/"J'aime quelqu'un d'hereux" (1977)
- "Je ne fais que passer"/"C'est beaucoup mieux comme ça" (1977)
- "Fallait fallait pas" (1978)

In German

- "Lern' Mit Den Augen Der Kinder Zu Sehen" (1973)
- "Ein Platz Für Die Liebe" (1974)
- "Wir Glauben An Das Leben" (1974)
- "Du Und Ich Und Zwei Träume" (1975)
- "Zum Glück Gibt Es Musik" (1975)
- "Ich Liebe Dich Ja Viel Zu Sehr" (1976)

=== Albums with Haim Saban ===
- Ulysse 31 (Bande Originale De La Série Télévisée) (1981)
- Inspector Gadget (Original Soundtrack of the TV Series) (1983)
- Inspector Gadget - The Music (1986)
- Dragon Ball Z: Original USA Television Soundtrack (1997)
- He-Man and the Masters of the Universe: Selections from the Original TV Series Soundtrack (2012)
- He-Man and the Masters of the Universe: Music from the Television Series (2015)
