= His and Her Christmas =

2005 television film directed by Farhad Mann

- Written by: Peter Sullivan
- Story by: Jeffrey Schenck
- Directed by: Farhad Mann
- Starring: Dina Meyer; David Sutcliffe; April Telek
- Music by: Peter Allen
- Countries of origin: United States; Canada
- Original language: English

Production
- Running time: 120 minutes
- Production companies: Shavick Entertainment; Insight Film Studios; Regent Entertainment

Original release
- Network: Lifetime
- Release: December 19, 2005

His and Her Christmas is a 2005 television film directed by Farhad Mann and starring Dina Meyer and David Sutcliffe. It first aired on December 19, 2005, on Lifetime.

== Plot ==
The film features the rivalry between two San Francisco Bay Area newspapers and their main writers, both of whom are single with their friends and family constantly trying to set them up with that special someone.

Tom Lane is the star columnist for the fictional San Francisco Sun, a newspaper owned by a media conglomerate. The Sun owners are thinking about increasing Tom's exposure by producing a new television show around him. Meanwhile, Liz Madison is the advice columnist for the Marin County Voice, a small community newspaper which is a throwback to gentler times, but struggling with circulation.

On November 2, the staff at the Voice learn that the Sun ownership has bought their newspaper, with the probable goal of folding it into the operations of the Sun, meaning the staff at the Voice will lose their jobs.

To fight back, Liz decides to change her column to an editorial, espousing the meaning of Christmas and the Voice to the community. Liz's feisty and entertaining stance of her new column results in the Voice increasing its circulation so much so that the Sun ownership has second thoughts about folding it.

However, keeping the Voice in circulation would, in turn, put Tom's new television show in jeopardy. To protect his career advancement, Tom decides to write a counterpoint column to Liz's, his about instilling some practicality into Christmas.

The competing columns become a personal battle for the two columnists. But as Tom and Liz spew their mutual loathing for each other, their respective friends try to convince them of the old adage that there is a fine line between love and hate.

== Cast ==
- Dina Meyer as Liz Madison
- David Sutcliffe as Tom Lane
- April Telek as Sarah (as April Amber Telek)
- Kyle Cassie as Elliott
- Alistair Abell as Nick
- Paula Devicq as Vicki Shaw
- Alexia Fast as Jacqui
- Scott Swanson as Billingsley
- Tony Alcantar as Hayden - Stylist
- Scott E. Miller as Clark (as Scott Miller)
- Garry Chalk as Anthony Shephard
- Campbell Lane as Harold Lane
- Karen Khunkhun as Grace Fields
- Suzanne Bastien as Black Woman
- Gigi De Leon as Christina (as Gigi deLeon)

== See also ==
- List of Christmas films
