= Hi-Tops Video =

Defunct American home video company (1986–1991)

- Industry: Home video
- Founded: October 27, 1986; 39 years ago
- Defunct: 1991; 35 years ago
- Fate: Label and its upcoming titles absorbed into Golden Book Video
- Parent: Media Home Entertainment (Heron Communications)

Hi-Tops Video was a children's home video sublabel of Media Home Entertainment (a division of Heron Communications), active from 1986 until 1991. Some of its releases include some Charlie Brown specials, Madeline and primarily some of the original Baby Songs video releases beginning in 1987.

== History ==
The company was initially run by Heron president Stephen Diener, with many of the other executive positions filled by people who had previously worked for rival Family Home Entertainment.

Deals made by Hi-Tops included a partnership with Worlds of Wonder to distribute Teddy Ruxpin tapes, and a deal with MTS Entertainment (the newly-formed television syndication arm of Mattel) for videos featuring Captain Power and the Soldiers of the Future, as well as the two Barbie specials produced by DIC Entertainment during this period (Barbie and the Rockers and Barbie and the Sensations) and a partnership with Saban Entertainment to start Saban Video.

Outside of the United States and Canada, Hi-Tops Video releases were distributed by other companies, examples being Video Program Distributors in the United Kingdom (rights to Hi-Tops content in the UK were later assumed by Channel 5 Video, a joint-venture of Heron and PolyGram Video) and Family Home Entertainment in Australia (not related to the Lionsgate-owned company of the same name). In Canada, some Hi-Tops Video releases were distributed by Astral Video, a now-defunct subsidiary of the present-day Astral Media.

In 1990, Video Treasures assumed distribution of Hi-Tops Video titles. Shortly afterwards, Media/Heron began seeking a buyer for the assets of Hi-Tops. In July 1991, Western Publishing acquired Hi-Tops Video from Heron Communications. Golden Book Video obtained rights to 60 yet to be released Hi-Tops Video titles, while previous titles were distributed by Video Treasures. Lightyear Entertainment moved its Stories to Remember series to BMG Video as a result of the sale.

== Products ==
=== Snoopy's Home Video Library ===
Hi-Tops Video was the original distributor of the first VHS releases of the majority of the Peanuts television specials. These specials were distributed as part of a series, Snoopy's Home Video Library.

- A Charlie Brown Christmas (1965) (Volume 2)
- Charlie Brown's All Stars! (1966) (Volume 10)
- It's the Great Pumpkin, Charlie Brown (1966) (Volume 11)
- He's Your Dog, Charlie Brown (1968) (Volume 1)
- It Was a Short Summer, Charlie Brown (1969) (Volume 18)
- Play It Again, Charlie Brown (1971) (Volume 16)
- You're Not Elected, Charlie Brown (1972) (Volume 13)
- It's the Easter Beagle, Charlie Brown (1974)
- Be My Valentine, Charlie Brown (1975)
- It's Your First Kiss, Charlie Brown (1977)
- What a Nightmare, Charlie Brown! (1978) (Volume 12)
- You're the Greatest, Charlie Brown (1979) (Volume 14)
- She's a Good Skate, Charlie Brown (1980) (Volume 7)
- Life is a Circus, Charlie Brown (1980) (Volume 15)
- It's Magic, Charlie Brown (1981) (Volume 9)
- Someday You'll Find Her, Charlie Brown (1981) (Volume 17)
- It's an Adventure, Charlie Brown (1983) (Volume 4)
- Is This Goodbye, Charlie Brown? (1983)
- It's Flashbeagle, Charlie Brown (1984) (Volume 8)

Some other Peanuts specials, such as A Charlie Brown Thanksgiving (1973), were not distributed by Hi-Tops Video, instead being distributed by Kartes Video Communications (a division of the E. W. Scripps Company), as well as some early VHS releases of The Charlie Brown and Snoopy Show. Some of the specials released in the Snoopy's Home Video Library series were earlier released by Media Home Entertainment on tapes with two or three specials appearing. The video (and DVD) distribution rights of all the Peanuts specials were later given to Paramount Home Entertainment from 1994 to 2007, then Warner Home Video from 2008 onwards.

=== Other shows and products ===
- Inhumanoids (1986–87)
- My Favorite Fairy Tales (1986)
- Madballs (U.S. only; distributed by Cineplex Odeon Video in Canada)
- Babar and Father Christmas (1986)
- Dick Tracy and The Oyster Caper (1986)
- Enchanted Journey (1986)
- Home Alone: A Kid's Guide to Playing It Safe When on Your Own (1987)
- Swan Lake (1987)
- Lady Lovely Locks and the Pixietails (1987)
- Cricket's Clubhouse (1987) (Based on the Cricket doll line by Playmates Toys)
- The Storybook Series with Hayley Mills (1987)
- The Adventures of Teddy Ruxpin (1987–88)
- My Pet Monster (1987–89)
- Barbie and the Rockers: Out of This World (1987)
- Barbie and the Sensations: Rockin' Back to Earth (1987) (the last two specials were released on a single tape)
- Commander Crumbcake (1987–89)
- Captain Power and the Soldiers of the Future (1987)
- Baby Songs (1987–91)
- The Tin Soldier (1987)
- Madeline (original special) (1988) (Cinar also produced the special, but the VHS only credits it to DiC Entertainment)
- Pee-wee's Playhouse (1988–89) (original releases)
- Visionaries: Knights of the Magical Light (1988–89)
- Gulliver's Travels
- Grimm's Fairy Tale Classics (1988–89)
- Barnyard Commandos (1988–90)
- Lyle, Lyle, Crocodile: The Musical (1989)
- Encyclopedia Brown (1989)
- Stories to Remember (1989–91)
- McTreasure Island: The Adventures of Ronald McDonald (1989)
- Mother Goose Rock 'n' Rhyme (1990)

Some other original video series, such as Little Schoolhouse, were produced for Hi-Tops Video. The Hi-Tops Video releases of The Adventures of Teddy Ruxpin were designed to be compatible with the Teddy Ruxpin doll.
