= Garry Chalk =

English-born Canadian actor (born 1952)

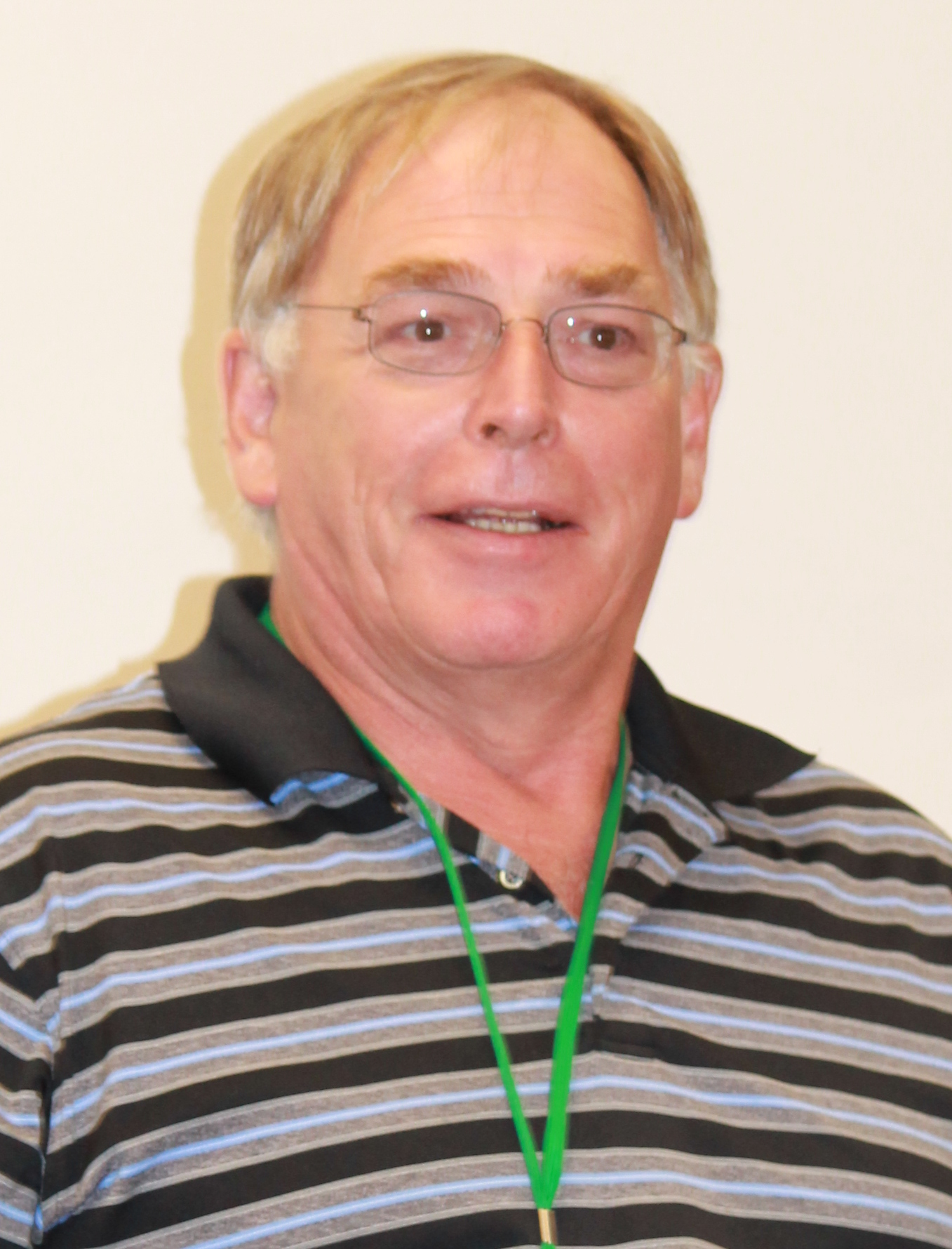
- Chalk at the Florida Supercon in 2013
- Born: Garry Chalk; February 17, 1952 (age 74); Southampton, Hampshire, England
- Citizenship: United Kingdom; Canada
- Occupation: Actor
- Years active: 1978–present
- Spouse: Colleen Hardwick (m. 2013)

Garry Chalk (born February 17, 1952) is an English-born Canadian actor. He has provided the voices for Optimus Primal of Beast Wars: Transformers and Beast Machines: Transformers, as well as Optimus Prime in the anime English dubs of Transformers: Armada, Transformers Energon, and Transformers: Cybertron. Chalk's live-action performances include The Fly II, Godzilla, Freddy vs. Jason, Stargate SG-1, and Cold Squad.

== Early life ==
Chalk was born in Southampton, Hampshire in 1952. When he was 5, his family moved to Vancouver, British Columbia, Canada.

== Career ==
Chalk has been involved with theatre since 1978 and has performed at the Vancouver Playhouse Theatre Company (VPTC), the Arts Club Theatre Company (ACTC), The Vancouver Theatresports League and various low-budget theatres in Canada. Chalk's last live stage production was A Funny Thing Happened on the Way to the Forum, where he played Miles Gloriosus. He also performed in Henry IV and As You Like It at the VPTC, as well as Dracula and Passion at the ACTC.

Most of his career has been in film and television, usually portraying corrupt members of law enforcement. He had a recurring role on Cold Squad for four years, for which he won Gemini Awards in two consecutive years, and until the close of its ninth season had a recurring role on the science-fiction series Stargate SG-1. Known for his enunciation and mellifluous deep voice, Chalk is also a veteran of over 1,500 animated productions including Class of the Titans, and the 2002 remake of He-Man and the Masters of the Universe. He is also known for his voice work in the Transformers franchise as the voice of Optimus Primal in Beast Wars and Beast Machines, and as Optimus Prime in the Unicron Trilogy. He also voiced the original Megatron in an episode of Beast Wars.

In the 2000s, he appeared in the Sci-Fi Channel shows Eureka, as Col. Briggs and Painkiller Jane, as Ruben Hennessey.

== Personal life ==
Chalk has been married to his wife Colleen Hardwick since September 2013.

In 2024, Chalk was diagnosed with stage 4 Hodgkin lymphoma.. On February 24, 2026, Chalk confirmed he had gone into remission.

== Filmography ==
=== Film ===
| Year | Title | Role | Notes |
|---|---|---|---|
| 1985 | The Journey of Natty Gann | Chicago Worker | |
| 1986 | Dragon Ball: Curse of the Blood Rubies | King Gourmeth | Voice, English version |
| 1989 | The Fly II | Scorby | |
| 1992 | The New Adventures of Little Toot | Captain Dogwood | Voice |
| 1997 | Warriors of Virtue | Mosely | Voice |
| 1998 | The Fearless Four | Platini, The Baron, The Miller, Guard #2 | Voice, English version |
| 2003 | Freddy vs. Jason | Sheriff Williams | |
| 2004 | The Karate Dog | Officer Brunelli | |
| 2004 | Superbabies: Baby Geniuses 2 | Police Captain | |
| 2005 | Fierce People | McCallum | |
| 2005 | His and Her Christmas | Anthony Shephard | Television film |
| 2005 | Supervolcano | Governor Billy Marshall | |
| 2006 | Stuart Little 3: Call of the Wild | Additional voices | |
| 2006 | Deck the Halls | Sheriff Dave | |
| 2006 | Eight Below | Boat Captain | |
| 2007 | Battle in Seattle | Chief Faherty | |
| 2008 | Christmas Town | Grandpa Jack | |
| 2009 | Scooby-Doo! The Mystery Begins | Vice-Principal Grimes | |
| 2009 | Watchmen | Military General | |
| 2010 | The Legend of Silk Boy | Grandfather | |
| 2011 | Marley & Me: The Puppy Years | Announcer | |
| 2012 | Big Time Movie | MI6 Agent #1 | |
| 2012 | A Christmas Story 2 | Santa Claus | Uncredited |
| 2013 | Suddenly | Sheriff Grant | |
| 2014 | Godzilla | Stan Welsh | |
| 2014 | Leprechaun: Origins | Hamish McConville | |
| 2015 | Tomorrowland | Jail Desk Jockey | |
| 2015 | Open Season: Scared Silly | Ed | Voice |
| 2016 | Stagecoach: The Texas Jack Story | Doc Forrester | |
| 2017 | Power Rangers | Captain Bowen | |
| 2017 | Max 2: White House Hero | Colonel Jones | |
| 2018 | The Predator | Postal Worker | |
| 2018 | Overboard | Dr. Fletcher | |
| 2018 | The Miracle Season | Principal Shaw | |
| 2020 | Cats & Dogs 3: Paws Unite! | Old Ed | Voice |
| 2020 | Sonic the Hedgehog | Navy Chief of Staff | |
| 2022 | Exile | Chief Sanders | |

=== Television ===
| Year | Title | Role | Notes |
|---|---|---|---|
| 1988–1989 | MacGyver | Tony Ellis / Detective Sweeney / Sergeant Harold Gray | 3 episodes |
| 1990 | It | Coach | TV miniseries |
| 1992 | Highlander: The Series | Bob Lemoyne | 1 episode |
| 1995–2000 | The Outer Limits | Detective Barnett / General / Detective Frank Dayton | 3 episodes |
| 1997–1998 | Ninja Turtles: The Next Mutation | Silver (voice) | 5 episodes |
| 1998 | Nick Fury: Agent of S.H.I.E.L.D. | Timothy Aloysius "Dum-Dum" Dugan | Television film |
| 1999–2005 | Cold Squad | Inspector Andrew Pawlachuk | 68 episodes |
| 2000 | Seven Days | Maj. Vladimir Markovsky | 1 episode |
| 2000–2001 | Dark Angel | Lt. Walter Eastep | 3 episodes |
| 2001–2006 | Stargate SG-1 | Colonel Chekov | 10 episodes |
| 2002 | Bang Bang You're Dead | Chief Bud McGee | Television film |
| 2002–2005 | The Dead Zone | James Stillson | 5 episodes |
| 2003 | Cowboys and Indians: The J.J. Harper Story | Inspector Ken Dowson | Television film |
| 2003 | National Lampoon's Thanksgiving Family Reunion | Fred Hodges | Television film |
| 2006 | Christmas on Chestnut Street | L.T. Crouch | Television film |
| 2006 | Eureka | Colonel Briggs | pilot episode |
| 2007 | Painkiller Jane | Ruben Hennessey | 1 episode |
| 2008 | Supernatural | Sheriff Deitrich | 1 episode |
| 2011–2012 | The Killing | Lt. Michael Oakes | 13 episodes |
| 2013–2014 | Cedar Cove | Sheriff Troy Davis | 11 episodes |
| 2015 | Fargo | Bartender | 1 episode |
| 2016 | Travelers | Detective Gower | 1 episode |
| 2016–2017 | Arrow | Lieutenant General J.G. Walker | 3 episodes |
| 2019 | Fast Layne | Colonel Hardy | 1 episode |
| 2019 | Love Under the Rainbow | Paul | Television film |
| 2022 | Love on Fire | Mayor Don Hamilton | Television film |
| 2023 | Riverdale | Al Fieldstone | 5 episodes |
| 2023 | Reba McEntire's The Hammer | Judge Carpenter | Television film |
| 2024 | Confessions of a Christmas Letter | Charles | Television film |

=== Animation ===
| Year | Title | Role | Notes |
|---|---|---|---|
| 1989–1991 | Camp Candy | Additional voices | |
| 1989–1991 | Captain N: The Game Master | King Hippo, Narrator, Donkey Kong, The Count, Bayou Billy, Malkil, Mayor Squaresly, Additional voices | |
| 1990–1992 | G.I. Joe | Metal-Head, Pathfinder, Shockwave, Gristle, BIOK, Road Pig, Various Cobra Troopers | 39 episodes |
| 1990 | Dragon Warrior | Baramos, Pablo, Ivan, Smuggler A, Sailors | 39 episodes |
| 1990 | The New Adventures of He-Man | He-Man, Artilla, Alcon, President Pell, Sgt. Krone, Andros | 39 episodes |
| 1991–1993 | Captain Zed and the Zee Zone | Captain Flannel | |
| 1991 | Bucky O'Hare and the Toad Wars! | Commander Dogstar, Al Negator, Quentin, MC, Major Bottlenose, Dan, Blackbeak, Kamikaze Kamo, General Baboon, Total Terror Toad, Digger McSquint, Wolf, Tri-Bot #1 | |
| 1991 | Funky Fables | Various characters | |
| 1992–1993 | Conan the Adventurer | Snagg, Gora, Conan's Father, Torrinon | |
| 1992–1993 | King Arthur and the Knights of Justice | Lord Viper, Warlord Bash, Sir Brick, Sir Phil | |
| 1992 | The Adventures of T-Rex | Bruno, Madder, Mayor Maynot | |
| 1993–1994 | Exosquad | Marsala, General Shiva, Nick Tyree, Charles McKenna, Pirate XO, Kruger, Albrecht Ketzer (1st voice) | |
| 1993–1994 | Double Dragon | Kona, Chop, Metro City Mayor, Wild Willy, John Lee, Tournament Announcer, Mick Mulgrew, Hoskins, Kwiss, Newscaster | |
| 1993–1996 | Adventures of Sonic the Hedgehog | Grounder, Dragon Breath, Captain Rescue, Computer ("Grounder the Genius"), Professor Caninestein, Mad Mike, Splorg, Boom Boom, Mayor Knotsworth, Tails' "Father", Captain Rescue, Farmer Peck, Six-Gun Pete, Captain John Paul Memo, Dragon Breath, Crack-Ups Narrator, Marriage Officiant, Torch, Bogeyman, Daredevil, Adoption Judge, Sir Humongous, Mobius Mint Director, Tiny, Kidnapping Victim, Hermit, Captain Finny, Roller, Professor Turtle, Pharaoh of Mobigypt, Magma the Volcano God, Bruno, Scraper, Officer, King Kommamachs, Camerabot, Fairy Godmother | |
| 1993–2001 | Madeline | Additional voices | |
| 1994–2001 | ReBoot | Slash, Herr Doktor, Turbo, Cyrus, Al's Waiter, Binomes, Eight, Viral Binomes, Saucy Mare Pirates, Mainframe CPU Officers, Agent Twelve, CPU Senior Chief, Silicon Tor Computer, Medic Binome, NeoViral Binome 2, Mr. Mitchell, Formula One Announcers, Zombie Binome 3, Santa Claus User, Jury, Merchant Binomes, Wrestling Announcers, Jake Blues Binomes | 37 episodes |
| 1994 | The Baby Huey Show | Additional voices | |
| 1994 | Sgt. Savage and His Screaming Eagles | Head Banger | |
| 1994 | Conan and the Young Warriors | Captain Tychus, Gounka, Curtides, Bruja, Hedmund, Vendor | |
| 1994–1996 | Mega Man | Guts Man, Bright Man, Dark Man, Needle Man, Heat Man, Stone Man, Mayor of New York City, Bomb Man, Spark Mandrill, Spark Man, Ring Man, Toad Man, Mission Control, Mr. Rozenko, Gyro Man, Cop Bot, Polie Chief, General Hawthorne, Lotos, Newsreader, Dark Man, Quarter Bo | |
| 1995–1996 | Action Man | Secretary Norris | |
| 1995 | Stories from My Childhood | Additional voices | |
| 1995 | Littlest Pet Shop | Sergeant Butch Kowalski | |
| 1995 | Darkstalkers | Donovan Baine | |
| 1995–1997 | G.I. Joe Extreme | Lt. Stone | |
| 1995–1997 | Street Fighter | Dhalsim, Burke (Col. Keith Wolfman) | |
| 1996 | The Adventures of Corduroy | Ellington, Security Guard, Circus Performer | |
| 1997 | Barbie and the Rockers: Out of This World | | |
| 1998–1999 | Pocket Dragon Adventures | Sir Nigel | |
| 1999 | Madeline: Lost in Paris | Additional voices | Direct-to-video film |
| 1999 | Sabrina: The Animated Series | Additional voices | |
| 1999–2001 | Sherlock Holmes in the 22nd Century | Additional voices | |
| 2000–2005 | Dragon Tales | Mungus the Giant, The Gilded Dragon, Various | 8 episodes |
| 2000 | Help! I'm a Fish | Flounder | |
| 2000–2004 | Yvon of the Yukon | Major Sweetley | |
| 2000–2001 | Action Man | Gangrene, Dr. Wolfgang Greenholtz | |
| 2001 | ReBoot: My Two Bobs | Slash, Herr Doktor, Turbo | Television film |
| 2002–2003 | Transformers: Armada | Optimus Prime | English version |
| 2002 | Sabrina: Friends Forever | Warlock #1, Cringe | Television film |
| 2003 | Barbie of Swan Lake | The Baker | Direct-to-video film |
| 2004–2005 | Transformers: Energon | Optimus Prime | English version |
| 2004 | In Search of Santa | Derridommis/Capn' Cragg | Direct-to-video film |
| 2004 | Barbie as the Princess and the Pauper | Herve | Direct-to-video film |
| 2004–2006 | Dragon Booster | Conner Penn/Mortis | |
| 2005–2006 | Transformers: Cybertron | Optimus Prime | English version |
| 2005–2006 | Firehouse Tales | Additional voices | |
| 2005 | The Legend of Frosty the Snowman | Santa | Television film |
| 2006 | Coconut Fred's Fruit Salad Island! | Vic | Episode: "Turn on Your Nut Light" |
| 2006 | Iron Kid | Duke von Rhymer | |
| 2006 | Barbie in the 12 Dancing Princesses | Desmond | |
| 2007 | Mosaic | Chief Faherty, Nathan Nelson | |
| 2007 | Tom and Jerry Tales | Head Lifeguard | |
| 2007 | The Ten Commandments | The General | |
| 2007 | Tom and Jerry: A Nutcracker Tale | The Evil King of the Cats | |
| 2007–08 | Care Bears: Adventures in Care-a-lot | Bumpity | |
| 2009–2010 | RollBots | Captain Pounder, Oddball | |
| 2009 | Barbie Presents: Thumbelina | Louie | |
| 2009–2020 | Dinosaur Train | Marco Megaraptor | |
| 2010 | Barbie in a Mermaid Tale | Break | |
| 2011–2021 | Superbook | Additional voices | |
| 2012 | Barbie in a Mermaid Tale 2 | Break | |
| 2014, 2020 | Monster Beach | Uncle Woody | Television film; TV series (48 episodes) |
| 2015–2017 | LEGO Nexo Knights | General Magmar, Additional voices | 20 episodes |
| 2017 | Barbie Dolphin Magic | Pete | Television film |
| 2018–2022 | Ninjago | Killow | 13 episodes |
| 2018–2019 | Mega Man: Fully Charged | Dr. Light | 25 episodes |

- 3-2-1 Penguins! – Sol, Bert/Cavitus
- ¡Mucha Lucha! – El Haystack Grande, Protozoa, El Kolor De Kurtz, Additional Voices
- Alien Racers – Dravox
- Animated Classic Showcase – Various Characters
- Barbie as the Island Princess – Frazer, Calvin
- Beast Machines: Transformers – Optimus Primal
- Beast Wars: Transformers – Optimus Primal, Megatron G1 (episode 38)
- Being Ian – Mr. Cartwright
- Billy the Cat – Additional Voices
- Chip and Potato – Gordie Pug
- Class of the Titans – Hercules and Ares
- Dragon Ball: Curse of the Blood Rubies – King Gurumes (1996 BLT/Funimation dub)
- Dennis the Menace: Cruise Control – Hector
- Eon Kid – Duke Von Rhymer
- Extreme Dinosaurs – Badrap
- Fat Dog Mendoza – Interpreter X, House Painter
- The Fearless Four – The Baron, The Miller, Platini, Guard #2
- G.I. Joe Extreme – Lieutenant Stone
- Gadget & the Gadgetinis – Additional Voices
- He-Man and the Masters of the Universe (2002) – Man-At-Arms (Duncan), Whiplash
- Hurricanes – Additional Voices
- Hello Carbot — Ace
- Kissyfur – Additional Voices
- LeapFrog – Additional Voices
- Leo the Lion: King of the Jungle – Leo the Lion
- Mama, Do You Love Me? – Papa
- Mummies Alive! – Referee, Old Man, Professor, Truck Driver, Movie Pharaoh, Yussef, Mr. Sullivan
- My Little Pony: Best Gift Ever – Prince Rutherford, Oak Nut, and Pony Vendor 3
- My Little Pony: Friendship Is Magic – Fido, Prince Rutherford
- Pinky Dinky Doo – Librarian
- Pirate Express – Pontus, Ted
- Popeye's Voyage: The Quest for Pappy – Bluto
- RoboCop: Alpha Commando – Additional Voices
- Rudolph the Red-Nosed Reindeer and the Island of Misfit Toys – Santa Claus, Bumble the Abominable Snowman
- Rudolph the Red-Nosed Reindeer: The Movie – Blitzen
- Scary Godmother: Halloween Spooktakular – Harry the Werewolf, Bug-A-Boo
- Scary Godmother: The Revenge of Jimmy – Harry the Werewolf, Bug-A-Boo
- Shadow Raiders – Emperor Femur
- Sitting Ducks – Jerry, Additional Voices
- Sleeping Beauty – Misc
- Sonic Underground – Dr. Robotnik, Additional Voices
- Spider-Man Unlimited – Mr. Meugniot, Additional Voices
- Street Sharks – Spike, El Swordo
- The Adventures of Corduroy
- The Colours of World – Captain Dark Colour
- The New Adventures of He-Man – He-Man, Artilla, President Pell, Alcon, Sgt. Krone, Andros, Gross
- Voltron Force – Sky Marshall Wade, Manset
- Weird-Ohs – Uncle Huey
- What About Mimi? – Principal Earl

=== Video games ===
| Year | Title | Role | Notes |
|---|---|---|---|
| 1992 | Bucky O'Hare | Al Negator, Total Terror Toad | |
| 1995 | Ripley's Believe It or Not!: The Riddle of Master Lu | Robert Ripley | |
| 1998 | ReBoot | Slash, Herr Doktor, Binomes, Pee-wee Herman Binome | |
| 1999 | Transformers: Beast Wars Transmetals | Optimus Primal | |
| 2004 | Transformers | Optimus Prime | |
| 2004 | Dragon Tales: Learn & Fly with Dragons | Mungus the Giant | |
| 2005 | Devil Kings | Devil King (English dub) | |
| 2006 | The Godfather: The Game | Bruno Tattaglia, Luca Brasi | |
| 2017 | Thimbleweed Park | Willie T. Wino, Carney Joe | |

== Awards ==
Gemini Awards

- 2000–2001/2001–2002 Best Supporting Actor in a Drama Series: Cold Squad

| Preceded by Neil Kaplan; 2001–2002; Robots in Disguise | Voice of Optimus Prime; 2001–2007; Unicron Trilogy | Succeeded by Peter Cullen; 2007; Video game and live-action movie |
| Preceded by Frank Welker; 1984–1987; Original series | Voice of Megatron/Galvatron; 1998; Beast Wars | Succeeded by Daniel Riordan; 2001–2002; Robots in Disguise |
