= Ted Cole =

Canadian voice actor

- Born: Theodore Cole; April 5, 1971 (age 55); Vancouver, British Columbia, Canada
- Occupations: Voice actor and actor
- Years active: 1987–present

Theodore Cole (born April 5, 1971) is a Canadian voice actor who works with Ocean Productions in numerous anime dubs. He's best known for his roles as Tatewaki Kuno in Ranma ½, Chang Wufei in Gundam Wing, Yamcha in the Ocean dub of Dragon Ball Z and Neil in Class of the Titans. He has also done live-action work as well.

== Filmography ==
=== Anime dubbing ===
- Dokkoida!? - Pierre the Slave
- Death Note - Reiji Namikawa, Ito Shiroba, John McEnroe/Larry Conners, Jack Neylon/Kal Snydar
- Dragon Ball - Yamcha (Ocean dub)
- Dragon Ball Z (Ocean dub) - Yamcha, Android 17, Jewel, Pui Pui, Korin (Seasons 4–9), Turles
- Dragon Ball Z Kai - Yamcha (Ocean Group Dub)
- Gintama° - Hasegawa
- Hamtaro - Boss, Curtis Milan
- Hikaru no Go - Michio Shirakawa
- Inuyasha - Lord Kuranosuke Takeda
- Master Keaton - Taichi Hiraga Keaton
- Megaman NT Warrior - Glyde
- Mobile Suit Gundam - Wakkein
- Mobile Suit Gundam 00 - David Carnegie, Bolz Assan
- Mobile Suit Gundam SEED - Ray Yuki, Yuri Amalfi
- Mobile Suit Gundam SEED Destiny - Gilbert Durandal
- Mobile Suit Gundam Wing - Chang Wufei
- Monkey Magic - Beedy
- Monster Rancher - Poritoka
- Powerpuff Girls Z - Spaghettihead
- Ranma ½ - Tatewaki Kuno, Hayato Ryujin
- The Story of Saiunkoku - Sho Sai
- Trouble Chocolate - Murakata
- Transformers Cybertron - Sideways
- The Vision of Escaflowne - Excavation Site Leader
- Zoids: Fuzors - Sigma, Jackie
- Zoids: New Century Zero - Leon Toros

=== Movie roles ===
- Dragon Ball Z: The Tree of Might - Yamcha
- Inuyasha the Movie: Fire on the Mystic Island - Kyōra
- Ranma ½: Big Trouble in Nekonron, China - Tatewaki Kuno
- Ranma ½: Nihao My Concubine - Tatewaki Kuno
- Gundam Seed: The Rumbling Universe - Ray Yuki
- Gundam Wing: Endless Waltz - Chang Wufei

=== Non-anime roles ===
- Class of the Titans - Neil, Phonus, Tartarus Guard, Daedalus, Moviegoer, Bearded Archaeologist, Telchine #3, Farmer Announcing Sybaris's Return
- Littlest Pet Shop - Squeaks
- X-Men: Evolution - Mr. Spear
- Scary Movie - Older Man In Theater
- Death Note - Lind L. Tailor (voice)
- Mobile Suit Gundam: Encounters in Space - Wakkein (voice), Anavel Gato (voice)
- Animated Classic Showcase - Additional Voices
- Camp Candy - Additional Voices
- Stone Protectors
- The New Adventures of He-Man - Karatti, Slush Head, Spinwit, Staghorn
- Kong: The Animated Series - Rakhir
- Roswell Conspiracies: Aliens, Myths and Legends - Additional Voices
- Tom and Jerry Tales - Monkey
