= Tony Alcantar =

American actor (born 1959/60)

- Born: Anthony Joseph Alcantar; 1959 or 1960 (age 65–66); Chicago, Illinois, U.S.
- Education: Roosevelt University (BA, MFA)
- Occupation: Actor

Anthony Joseph Alcantar (born in 1959 or 1960) is an American actor. He has done improv work with the Windy City Women Improv Troupe, acted in TV shows and films, provided voice acting for TV animation and video games, and worked as a dialect coach.

== Early life ==
Alcantar was born and raised in Chicago. He earned a Bachelor of Arts degree in theater and MFA in acting from the Theatre Conservatory at Roosevelt University.

== Career ==
Alcantar toured and performed with The Second City in both Toronto and London, Ontario. From 1989 to 1998, Alcantar taught at the Players Workshop of the Second City, directing 16 shows there.

After relocating to Vancouver, British Columbia, in 1999, Alcantar landed guest star or recurring roles on numerous shows, including Stargate SG-1, Dead Like Me, Da Vinci's Inquest, The Dead Zone, The Collector, Andromeda, Dark Angel, Millennium, Strange World, Honey I Shrunk the Kids, Just Deal, Cold Squad, Los Luchadores, The Outer Limits, and Breaking News. He had a recurring role on NBC's series American Dreams.

Alcantar performed in the mockumentary Best in Show, the all-improvised film directed by Christopher Guest. He also appeared in MVPII, The Rhino Brothers, Ballistic: Ecks vs. Sever, The Charlie's Angels Story, Chestnut: Hero of Central Park, Hope Springs, Fantastic Four, His and Her Christmas and In the Land of Women.

Alcantar has had lead and principal roles in the animated shows Slammin' Sammy, Being Ian, Alienators: Evolution Continues, Inspector Gadget and the Gadgetinis, Kong: The Animated Series, Gundam Wing, Journey to the Center of the Earth, and MegaMan NT Warrior. He has provided both voice and body to the upcoming Electronic Arts' video game The Godfather: The Game and did multiple voices for SSX On Tour. Alcantar has also been the dialect coach on the features Slither, Whisper, and The Wicker Man. He has worked as a dialect coach on the TV shows Fargo and Fear the Walking Dead.

In 2017, he played a minor role as the Mayor of Fillydelphia in the My Little Pony: Friendship Is Magic season seven episode "A Royal Problem".

== Notable students ==
- Sean Hayes, Emmy winner, and star of Will & Grace studied under Tony at the Players Workshop of The Second City.
- Stephnie Weir, star of MADtv, studied under Tony at the Players Workshop of The Second City in the 1990s.
- Grace Park, who plays Boomer in Battlestar Galactica studied with Tony at Improv Chicago in Vancouver.

== Filmography ==
=== Film ===
Year	Title	Role	Notes
1992	Butterscotch and Chocolate	Butterscotch Barnes	
2000	Best in Show	Philly AM Chef	
2001	The Rhino Brothers Present the World's Worst Records	Frank	
2001	MVP 2: Most Vertical Primate	Eric Clark	
2002	Ballistic: Ecks vs. Sever	Edgar Moore	
2003	Hope Springs	Webster	
2004	Chestnut: Hero of Central Park	Chef	
2005	The Deal	Agent Grazer	
2005	Fantastic Four	Compound Reporter #1	
2007	When a Man Falls in the Forest	Hardware Store Customer	
2007	Numb	Mt. Sinai Researcher	
2007	Postal	Angry Man	
2007	Battle in Seattle	Mark Harrinton	
2007	Martian Child	Barber	
2008	Christmas Town	Santa Charlie Ketchum	
2009	The Break-Up Artist	Bob Green	
2012	A Christmas Story 2	Dr. Gunter Strassen	
2013	The Marine 3: Homefront	Glen	
2013	Concrete Blondes	Mick	
2013	Lawrence & Holloman	Lawrence's Boss	
2014	Big Eyes	Fan #2	
2014	Cheat	Harris Brown	
2016	Killing Poe	Ralph Thompson	

=== Television ===
Year	Title	Role	Notes
1995	Mobile Suit Gundam Wing	Additional voices (English dub)	1 episode
1999	Millennium	Chuck	Episode: "Collateral Damage"
1999	Strange World	FBI Assistant	Episode: "Eliza"
2000	The Outer Limits	Director	Episode: "Judgement Day"
2000	Honey, I Shrunk the Kids: The TV Show	Thug	Episode: "Honey, Whodunit?"
2000	Hollywood Off-Ramp	Claude	Episode: "Death by Gossip"
2000	The Fearing Mind	Hospital Attendant	Episode: "Good Harvest"
2000	Just Deal	Car Salesman	Episode: "Joyride"
2001	The Immortal	Gnome Two	Episode: "Forest for the Trees"
2001	Los Luchadores	Museum Guard Bob	2 episodes
2001	Till Dad Do Us Part	Smoking Man	Television film
2001	MegaMan NT Warrior	SpikeMan (voice: English dub)	Recurring role
2001–2002	Ultimate Book of Spells	Voice	26 episodes
2001–2002	Alienators: Evolution Continues	Additional voices	17 episodes
2002	Dark Angel	Irving	Episode: "Borrowed Time"
2002	Romantic Comedy 101	Mannix Waiter	Television film
2002	Breaking News	Dino	7 episodes
2002–2003	American Dreams	Lewd Camera Guy	6 episodes
2003	Impromptu: The Audition	Marty Klein	Television film
2003	Gadget & the Gadgetinis	Additional voices	51 episodes
2004	Andromeda	Sy	2 episodes
2004	The L Word	Man in Suit	Episode: "Let's Do It"
2004	Being Ian	Dirk Octane	Episode: "Ian's Louse-Ey Day"
2004	Da Vinci's Inquest	Barry	2 episodes
2004	Behind the Camera: The Unauthorized Story of Charlie's Angels	VP of Research	Television film
2004	Tru Calling	Monty the Car Salesman	Episode: "Death Becomes Her"
2004	Meltdown: Days of Destruction	Reactor Tech Chuck Pasquin	Television film
2004	The Dead Zone	Polygraph Operator	Episode: "Finding Rachel: Part 2"
2004	The Collector	Frank	Episode: "Another Collector"
2004	Dead Like Me	Ned Benjamin	Episode: "In Escrow"
2005	His and Her Christmas	Hayden	Television film
2006	Stargate SG-1	Dr. Myers	Episode: "The Scourge"
2006	The Evidence	Landlord	Episode: "Wine and Dine"
2006	Three Moons Over Milford	Councilman Rose	Episode: "Unaired Pilot"
2007	Unthinkable	Forensic Agent	Television film
2007	Psych	Auctioneer	2 episodes
2008	Under One Roof	Lyle Fitzgerald	Episode: "Cell Out"
2008	Aliens in America	Mr. Weinblau	Episode: "The Muslim Guard"
2008	Love to Kill	Nabor	Television film
2009	Revolution	Principal Dont	Television film
2009	Alice	Waiting Room Ace	2 episodes
2010	Hiccups	School Principal	Episode: "Autograph Hound"
2010	Tower Prep	Psychology Professor	Episode: "Dreams"
2012	Abducted: The Carlina White Story	Statistics Clerk	Television film
2012	Once Upon a Time	Cashier	Episode: "Tallahassee"
2012	Level Up	The Swirling Giver	Episode: "The Swirling Giver"
2013	Supernatural	Chris Hinckley	Episode: "Torn and Frayed"
2013	Motive	Devon Pearman	Episode: "Ruthless"
2013	Continuum	Future Clerk	Episode: "Seconds"
2013	Arrow	Pharmacist	Episode: "State v. Queen"
2014	A Fairly Odd Summer	Ed Leadly	Television film
2014–2018	The Actress Diaries	Archie	10 episodes
2015	Bridal Wave	Dorian	Television film
2015	Harvest Moon	Howard Gordon	Television film
2015	Once Upon a Holiday	Simon	Television film
2015	When Calls the Heart	Mike Ward / Reporter	Episode: "New Year's Wish"
2016	Stake Out	Boss	Episode: "The Beginning"
2017	My Little Pony: Friendship Is Magic	Mayor of Fillydelphia (voice)	Episode: "The Royal Problem"
2018	iZombie	Casper	Episode: "Chivalry Is Dead"
2019	Project Blue Book	Carlton Fanshaw	Episode: "The Lubbock Lights"
2019	Van Helsing	Officer Rudolph	Episode: "No 'I' in Team"
2025	The Thundermans: Undercover	Brain Freeze	Episode: "Save the Date"

=== Video games ===
Year	Title	Role	Notes
2005	SSX on Tour	Additional voices	
2006	The Godfather	Paulie Gatto	
2006	The Godfather: Mob Wars	Paulie Gatto	
2007	The Godfather: The Don's Edition	Paulie Gatto	
2007	The Godfather: Blackhand Edition	Paulie Gatto	
