= My Favorite Fairy Tales =

Japanese OVA series

- The U.S. VHS cover of Volume 2

世界童話アニメ全集 (Sekai Dōwa Anime Zenshū)
- Genre: Fantasy
- Original video animation
- Directed by: Shigeru Omachi (Japanese); Robert Barron (Saban)
- Produced by: Yoshikazu Tochihira (Japanese); Haim Saban; Shuki Levy (Saban)
- Written by: Shigeru Omachi; Shogo Hirata (Japanese) Winston Richard (Saban)
- Music by: Masahito Maruyama (Japanese); Shuki Levy (Saban)
- Studio: Studio Unicorn
- Licensed by: NA: Saban International
- Released: 1986 – 1986
- Runtime: 12 minutes
- Episodes: 10 (Japanese); 14 (Saban)

My Favorite Fairy Tales (世界童話アニメ全集, Sekai Dōwa Anime Zenshū; lit. "The Complete Animated World's Children's Stories") is a Japanese educational fantasy original video animation (OVA) series of fairy tales and other classic stories produced by Studio Unicorn in 1986.

== Outline ==
The series originally consists of 10 12-minutes episodes, played in each videotape first in English and then in Japanese, followed by a short glossary sequence with the purpose of teaching English to Japanese children. The English track was provided by studio Academy.

It was then released by Saban Productions for foreign market. Saban's adaptation consisted in a totally different English dub, a new score and the inclusion of four short films from Toei Animation's unrelated series World Famous Fairy Tale Series, for a total of 14 episodes.

Ownership of the series passed to Disney in 2001 when Disney acquired Fox Kids Worldwide, which also includes Saban Entertainment. Despite that the series is not available on Disney+.

== Episodes ==
Original Japanese ten-episode release:

No.	Title	Original release date
1	"The Ugly Duckling"; Transliteration: "Minikui ahiru no ko" (Japanese: みにくいあひるの子)	1986
2	"The Three Little Pigs"; Transliteration: "Sanbiki no kobuta" (Japanese: 三びきのこぶた)	1986
3	"Snow White"; Transliteration: "Shirayuki hime" (Japanese: しらゆきひめ)	1986
4	"Little Red Riding Hood"; Transliteration: "Akazukin" (Japanese: 赤ずきん)	1986
5	"Puss 'n Boots"; Transliteration: "Nagagutsu wo haita neko" (Japanese: ながぐつをはいた猫)	1986
6	"The Little Mermaid"; Transliteration: "Ningyo hime" (Japanese: にんぎょひめ)	1986
7	"Little Black Sambo"; Transliteration: "Chibikuro sambo" (Japanese: ちびくろサンボ)	1986
8	"The Wolf and the Seven Little Kids"; Transliteration: "Ookami to 7 hiki no koyagi" (Japanese: おおかみと７ひきのこやぎ)	1986
9	"Cinderella"; Transliteration: "Shinderera hime" (Japanese: シンデレラひめ)	1986
10	"Ali Baba and the Forty Thieves"; Transliteration: "Ari Baba to 40 nin no touzoku" (Japanese: アリババと４０人のとうぞく)	1986

In the U.S. there were five VHS volumes, totalling fourteen episodes:

Volume	Episodes
1	Little Red Riding Hood; Ali Baba and the Forty Thieves; Puss 'n Boots
2	The Three Little Pigs; The Ugly Duckling; The Wolf and the Seven Little Kids
3	Sleeping Beauty; Snow White; Cinderella
4	The Wizard of Oz; The Magic Carpet; Ali Baba and the Forty Thieves
5	Snow White; The Little Mermaid; The Cobbler and the Elves

== Cast ==
=== Japanese cast ===
- Toshiko Fujita - Narrator
- Arisa Andou
- Chika Sakamoto
- Daisuke Gouri
- Eriko Hara
- Kenichi Ogata
- Kōzō Shioya
- Masaharu Satō
- Yoshino Ohtori

=== English cast ===
==== Academy dub ====
- Susan Brooks - Narrator
- Charmian Norman Taylor
- James House
- Michael Bannard
- Steve Long

==== Saban dub ====
- Barbara Goodson - Narrator (in "Puss in Boots"), Fairy Godmother (in "Cinderella"), Farmer's Wife, Little Boy, Mother Duck (in "The Ugly Duckling"), Mermaid Queen (in "The Little Mermaid")
- Doug Lee - Narrator (in "Red Riding Hood")
- Robert Axelrod - Narrator (in "The Ugly Duckling")
- Steve Kramer - Narrator (in "The Wolf and the Seven Little Kids")
- Ted Lehmann - Narrator (in "Snow White" and "The Three Little Pigs")
- Bill Capizzi - Puss in Boots (in "Puss-in-Boots"), Rooster (in "The Ugly Duckling")
- Cam Clarke - Bo (in "The Wolf and the Seven Little Kids"), The Ugly Duckling (in "The Ugly Duckling"), Michael's Brother (in "Puss-in-Boots"), Prince John (in "Cinderella"), Toto (in "The Wizard of Oz")
- Frank Catalano - Michael (in "Puss-in-Boots")
- Rebecca Forstadt - Little Red Riding Hood (in "Red Riding Hood"), The Little Mermaid (in "The Little Mermaid"), Little Girl (in "The Ugly Duckling"), Young Cinderella (in "Cinderella")
- Wendee Lee - Cinderella (in "Cinderella"), Snow White (in "Snow White")
- Clifton Wells - Old Duck (in "The Ugly Duckling")
- Dave Mallow - Guard, Michael's Brother, Peasant (in "Puss-in-Boots")
- Edie Mirman - Cassim's Wife (in "Ali Baba and the Forty Thieves")
- Edward Mannix - Huntsman (in "Snow White")
- Lara Cody - Princess (in "Puss-in-Boots")
- Michael Reynolds - Dwarf, Magic Mirror (in "Snow White"), King (in "Puss-in -Boots"), Mermaid King (in "The Little Mermaid")
- Michael Sorich - Dwarf (in "Snow White)
- Richard Epcar - Ogre (in "Puss-in-Boots")
- Robert Barron - Farmer, Villager (in "Red Riding Hood"), Father (in "Cinderella"), Father, Frog, Peasant (in "Puss-in-Boots"), Paka (in "Ali Baba and the Forty Thieves")
- Alice Smith
- Benjamin Walker
- Kimberly Crystal
- Kris Noel Pearson
- Stanley Harold
- Xavier Garcia

== Music ==
The original incidental music was composed by Masahito Maruyama, and by Haim Saban and Shuki Levy for the Saban version. Most of Saban and Levy's music was reused in the later TV series Grimm's Fairy Tale Classics.

== Releases ==
In 1987, the series was originally released on five VHS volumes by Hi-Tops Video. A sixth and final VHS volume was released by Hi-Tops Video in 1990, featuring a rerelease of The Little Mermaid and including the King Grizzlebeard episode from Grimm's Fairy Tale Classics as a bonus episode. The Daily Mirror (a British newspaper) released The Three Little Pigs and Alibaba and Forty Thieves on a promotional DVD in 2006. US distributor Digiview Entertainment released The Wizard of Oz episode as part of their Cartoon Craze series.
