= In Search of Santa =

- Film poster
- Directed by: William R. Kowalchuk
- Written by: Michael Aschner; Lee Tockar
- Produced by: William R. Kowalchuk; Louis Sek
- Starring: Hilary Duff; Haylie Duff
- Edited by: William R. Kowalchuk
- Production companies: Colorland Animation; Tundra Productions
- Distributed by: Miramax Home Entertainment (Note: Under Miramax Family imprint) (though Buena Vista Home Entertainment) (North America); Paramount Home Entertainment (International)
- Release date: October 27, 2004
- Running time: 78 minutes
- Countries: United States; Canada; China
- Language: English

In Search of Santa is a 2004 animated Christmas adventure film starring Hilary Duff and her older sister Haylie Duff in their first voice roles. It was directed by William R. Kowalchuk, the production of the film began in 1998 as it was originally to be entirely made in hand-drawn traditional animation and have planned to be released in 1999, but then somehow decided to, not only it was switched from hand-drawn to fully CGI, but to be pushed further to be released on October 27, 2004, in Australia and on November 23, 2004, in the United States. The film was animated using Alias Maya.

== Synopsis ==
King Calvin and Queen Penelope have their eggs laid and as their daughters hatch, the parents name them Crystal and Lucinda. As the sisters grow, despite their differences, they compromise and head to the North Pole to find Santa Claus.

They want to save Christmas, which Crystal believes in earlier and all along. After saving a seal in the middle of their quest, both sisters meet the pirates: Capn' Cragg (a walrus), Bugkus Bill (a stork) and a pelican.

== Cast ==
- Hilary Duff as Princess Crystal
- Haylie Duff as Princess Lucinda
- Jason Michas as Eugene/Gardener Elf
- Kathleen Barr as Lady Agonysia/Mrs. Clause/Queen Penelope/Katie/Marcus/Mimi
- Scott McNeil as Mortmottimes/Bugkus Bill/Timebomb Tom
- Garry Chalk as Derridommis/Capn' Cragg
- French Tickner as Santa Claus
- Dale Wilson as King Calvin
- Nicole Bouma as Baby Crystal/Wing Maiden #1 & #5/Additional Voices
- Tabitha St. Germain as Baby Lucinda/Additional Voices
- Lee Tockar as Max/Phillip/Pup
- Cathy Weseluck as William/Wing Maiden #4 & #6
- Richard Newman as Narrator

== Development ==
Miramax secured North American distribution rights to the film in January 2004. The company went on board with the film following the immense success of their previous animated film acquisition Bionicle: Mask of Light.

== Reception ==
The film received generally negative reviews, with viewers heavily criticizing its poor CGI animation quality and weak script. UltimateDisney wrote "the film has not succeeded in challenging, engaging, or even entertaining but it is colorful and somewhat lively" and that "the makers of In Search of Santa hope that the appeal of computer animation, Christmas, and the Duff sisters will encourage people to check their movie out."

== See also ==
- List of animated feature films
- List of computer-animated films
- List of children's films
- List of Christmas films
- Santa Claus in film
