= Weird-Ohs =

Animated television series

- Genre: Comedy
- Created by: Bill Campbell
- Directed by: Ezekiel Norton; James Boshier
- Voices of: Kathleen Barr; Cusse Mankuma; Tabitha St. Germain
- Theme music composer: Mark Berry; Robert Buckley
- Composers: David Sinclair; Peter Berring; Robert Buckley
- Countries of origin: Canada; United States; Germany
- Original language: English
- No. of seasons: 1
- No. of episodes: 13 (26 segments)

Production
- Executive producers: Bill Mattheny; Ian Pearson; Mark Ralston; Christopher J. Brough; Steven DeNure
- Producers: Kim Dent Wilder; Ezekiel Norton
- Running time: 21 minutes (10 minutes per segment)
- Production companies: Decode Entertainment; EM.TV & Merchandising AG; Mainframe Entertainment; Testors Corporation

Original release
- Network: YTV (Canada); Fox Family Channel (US)
- Release: September 15, 1999 – March 15, 2000

Weird-Ohs is an animated television series produced by Decode Entertainment, Mainframe Entertainment and EM.TV & Merchandising AG in association with the Testors Corporation. The show originally aired in 1999 until 2000 on Fox Family (now Freeform) in the United States and YTV in Canada. Only 13 episodes of the series were produced.

== Synopsis ==
External videos
- Weird-Ohs - Demolition Impossible (Unaired Pilot Remaster) via the Mainframe Studios YouTube channel

The show focused on deformed characters and their misadventures in Weirdsville, a place just off Route 66. It was based on a popular toy line, and featured two anthro teenagers, Portia and Eddie, living in a world populated with talking cars.

== Production ==
The concept and characters were based on the Weird-Ohs series of polystyrene model kits by the Hawk Company. The characters in the model kits were popular in the early 1960s as satire on America's car culture.

== Honours ==
In 2000, the show was nominated for a Gemini award.

== Characters ==
- Digger (voiced by Kathleen Barr): Portia's brother.
- Eddie (voiced by Cusse Mankuma): Digger's best friend.
- Portia (voiced by Tabitha St. Germain): Digger's older sister.
- Daddy-O Chassis (voiced by Scott McNeil): Digger and Portia's teacher at their school.
- Mama-B Chassis (voiced by Kathleen Barr): Daddy-O's wife. She owns Mama-B's Diner. Her voice is an imitation of actress Katharine Hepburn.
- Baby Chassis (voiced by Ian James Corlett): Daddy-O and Mama-B's infant son.
- Davey (voiced by Scott McNeil): A biker and Portia's crush, who doesn't notice her. He loves his motorcycle.
- Wade (voiced by Ian James Corlett): A snobby rich kid and Digger's rival. Wade has a crush on Portia, who doesn't reciprocate his feelings.
- Killer McBash (voiced by Scott McNeil): Wade's bodyguard/valet/driver.
- Leaky Boat Louie (voiced by Mark Acheson): A big sailor guy who has different jobs.
- Uncle Huey (voiced by Garry Chalk): A hillbilly driving a car similar to the Arkansas Chuggabug 8 from Hanna-Barbera's Wacky Races. He has a pet crocodile/alligator named Carry-On.
- Slingrave Curvette (voiced by Elizabeth Carol Savenkoff): A one-time substitute teacher and later principal. She makes occasional appearances as a Vanna White-like game show co-host/model.
