= The Adventures of T-Rex =

- Created by: Michael Wahl; Lee Gunther
- Developed by: Michael Wahl; Lee Gunther; Jean Chalopin
- Directed by: Stephane Martinere
- Voices of: Kathleen Barr; Michael Beattie; Garry Chalk; Ian James Corlett; Michael Donovan; Phil Hayes; Scott McNeil; Robert O. Smith; Venus Terzo; Dale Wilson
- Composer: Robert J. Walsh
- Countries of origin: United States; Japan; France
- Original languages: English; Japanese; French
- No. of seasons: 1
- No. of episodes: 52

Production
- Executive producers: Lee Gunther; Michael Wahl; Jean Chalopin; Hidenori Taga; Mark Taylor
- Producers: Rudy J. Zamora; Xavier Picard; Shigekazu Ochiai
- Running time: 30 minutes
- Production companies: Gunther-Wahl Productions; Kitty Films; Créativité et Développement; Madhouse

Original release
- Network: Syndication
- Release: September 14, 1992 – January 8, 1993

The Adventures of T-Rex (T-レックス (T-rekkusu)) is an animated TV series that aired in syndication from September 14, 1992 to January 8, 1993 in North America. The show features five musical Tyrannosaurus brothers who played to sold-out crowds as a vaudeville group for the Dragon company. The company was owned by the beautiful and wealthy Myrna. The band members were also secretly fighting crime as "T-REX," masterminded by Professor Edison. The show is notably an American, Japanese and French co-production between Gunther-Wahl Productions, Créativité et Développement (C&D), and well-known anime producers Kitty Films and Madhouse. It lasted only one season.

== Plot ==
Set in a world of anthropomorphic dinosaurs, brothers Bernie (blue), Bruno (pink), Bubba (green), Buck (yellow) and Bugsy (purple) were born with special powers to help fight crime. Each brother's special power was related to a specific part of their anatomy; Bernie's legs, Bruno's arms, Bubba's tail, Buck's mouth and teeth, and Bugsy's telekinetic eyes. In the day, they make up a singing and Comedy Quintet group that perform at the Dragon Company in Rep City. The group rode out on their Rexmobile to battle "Big Boss" Graves, crime kingpin of Rep City, and his evil organization The Corporation which also consists of Little Boss, Adder, Madder, Shooter, Cuddles, Axe, and the Doctor. Kid sister Ginger was part of the singing group, but didn't know about her brothers' secret identities.

One of the show's other noteworthy elements was giving the T-Rexes imitation celebrity voices: Jack Benny (Bernie), Art Carney (Bruno), Bing Crosby (Buck), George Burns (Bugsy), and Jimmy Durante (Bubba).

== Voice cast ==
- Kathleen Barr - Flo, Myrna, Black Widow
- Michael Beattie - Buck, Delaney
- Garry Chalk - Bruno, Madder, Mayor Maynot
- Michael Donovan - Professor Edison, Shooter, Big Dinosaur
- Ian James Corlett - Bugsy, Waldo Winch
- Phil Hayes - Little Boss, Axe
- Scott McNeil - Bubba, Adder
- Robert O. Smith - Bernie, Cuddles, Dr. Death
- Venus Terzo - Ginger, Mae
- Dale Wilson - Big Boss Graves, Bissell

== Episode list ==
No.	Title	Original release date
1	"Hijack"	September 21, 1992
Jealous of the Dragon Company's success, Big Boss Graves starts attacking the club's food and drink deliveries and even steals Ginger!
2	"Hot Shot"	September 16, 1992
Big Boss Graves calls in a Colossusaurus named Hot Shot to deal with T-Rex.
3	"Rep Side Story"	TBA
Shooter's attempts to steal the Soap Diamond are hindered when he falls in love with Myrna.
4	"Star"	TBA
Bruno and Bernie are tricked by the Corporation into robbing a bank and Bugsy, Buck, and Bubba have to prove their innocence.
5	"Mesmerized Mayor"	TBA
Boss Graves has the Black Widow hypnotize Mayor Maynot, allowing the Corporation to do whatever they please.
6	"The Big Freeze"	TBA
Shooter frames Myrna for stealing a diamond bracelet to prove that the Brothers are T-Rex.
7	"Vinny and the Brothers"	TBA
Myrna's nephew Vinny falls in with the Corporation.
8	"Big Time at the Big House"	TBA
Boss Graves is arrested and sent to Hum-Hum. His arrest was all part of his plan to steal the entire island.
9	"Rep City Games"	TBA
The Brothers enter the Mesozoic Games, but the Corporation kidnaps Ginger to force them to lose.
10	"Robo-Flop"	TBA
Professor Edison quits T-Rex and builds robotic crimefighter Robo-Rex, which turns against him.
11	"Screwloose"	September 14, 1992
Graves breaks out a criminal named Screwloose to get his ledger back.
12	"Radio-Dazed"	October 6, 1992
Boss Graves uses the radio show of Omnivorous Welles to cause a panic in Rep City.
13	"Where's Ed?"	October 16, 1992
As the T-Rexes investigate a substance used by Boss Grave's gang, Professor Edison disappears.
14	"The Comeback Kid"	TBA
Bruno falls into a depression after accidentally hurting Buck.
15	"The Fabulous Brother Boys"	TBA
Graves enlists a lovely lady named Ruby to help in a revenge scheme against Howard Huge and T-Rex all fall for her.
16	"Play It Again"	TBA
Bugsy's old flame comes to Rep city and her fiancée is kidnapped by the Corporation.
17	"Big Boss Blues"	TBA
T-Rex is tasked with escorting a famous piano player, but they and the Corporation mistake a phone book thief for him.
18	"Witness Protection"	TBA
Little Boss claims to want to turn states' evidence on Graves in an attempt to learn the identities of T-Rex.
19	"The Biggest Chill"	TBA
One of Graves' men buys and hides a rare stamp and Graves steals Professor Edison's weather-controlling blimp to find it.
20	"Dance Fever"	TBA
Bernie and Myrna enter a dance competition at the Plantation, unaware that Big Boss Graves plans to hypnotize the contestants.
21	"The Contender"	TBA
Bruno becomes a boxer, setting him up against members of the Corporation.
22	"The Mayor's Egg"	TBA
Mayor Maynot's egg is kidnapped and Bubba is framed for it.
23	"The Flying Boat"	TBA
Little Boss and Shooter accidentally end up on Howard Huge's seaplane and Bruno must overcome his fear of flying to help his brothers.
24	"Rep City Guru"	TBA
A guru is taking Rep City by storm, but he may not be all that he seems.
25	"The Kimono Caper"	TBA
The Corporation is stealing kimonos and T-Rex has to find out why.
26	"Doctor in the House"	TBA
T-Rex visits their parents and discovers that the Doctor is using plastic surgery to make lookalikes of the Corporation.
27	"Cruisin' for a Bruisin'"	TBA
28	"Country Cousins"	TBA
Buck goes to the country to work on his banjo playing, but finds Graves' henchmen trying to shake down some rutabaga farmers.
29	"The Rexmobile"	TBA
The Corporation steals the Rexmobile to aid in their car thefts.
30	"Really Big Foot"	TBA
Myrna is captured by a tribe to offer to Really Big Foot and T-Rex must save her.
31	"It's All in the Cards"	TBA
A fortuneteller's predictions make a superstitious Bubba overly paranoid.
32	"Flo and Ed"	TBA
After a fight with Graves, Flo starts dating Professor Edison to make him jealous.
33	"Fight at the Opera"	TBA
The Plantation hijacks an opera, one its cast being Buck's girlfriend.
34	"The Rex Stuff"	TBA
Edison trains Bubba to be an astro-dino to study eclipses while Big Boss Graves tries to start an eclipse of his own.
35	"Rep City Blues"	TBA
T-Rex is tasked with making Chief Delaney and the police more competent.
36	"Radio Rip-off"	TBA
37	"Ginger Snaps"	TBA
Ginger obtains money stolen by Little Boss and befriends Myrna's overbearing mother.
38	"They Flap by Night"	TBA
A group of mysterious robberies are occurring and the culprits are a bunch of trained Pterosaurs.
39	"The Dough Stops Here"	December 15, 1992
40	"Bungee Bandits"	TBA
Adder and Madder use bungee cords to try to rob jewels for Big Boss Graves' wedding.
41	"The Best Offense"	TBA
In order to steal the Mona Lizard, Big Boss Graves has the Doctor analyze T-Rex for weaknesses where Graves' minions make photographs to help out in the analyzing.
42	"My Fair Chain Gang"	TBA
Graves teaches the Chain Gang how to be sophisticated in order to have them infiltrate high-society parties.
43	"The Grand Science Fair"	TBA
Professor Edison's brother Phineas comes to Rep City for the Grand Science Fair and T-Rex has to protect him from the Corporation.
44	"Crime Takes a Holiday"	TBA
Fed up with all the crime in Rep City, Myrna and Flo team up to deal with it themselves.
45	"The Rep City Rockets"	TBA
Angry that Bruno's baseball team is keeping kids off the street, Big Boss Graves takes over their rival team.
46	"It's a Gas"	TBA
Boss Graves uses sleeping gas to rob the entire city and Bugsy and Professor Edison have to find a cure to wake up the rest of T-Rex.
47	"The Big Bite"	TBA
48	"Bag of Bones"	TBA
The Corporation follows Professor Edison to steal some ancient bones and end up stealing the Murray Award, earning the wrath of Really Big Foot.
49	"Up the River"	TBA
Bugsy and Bubba try to find their way to an army jungle camp while Boss Graves tries to find T-Rex's transformation machine.
50	"Weekend in the Country"	TBA
T-Rex spends the weekend at a resort, only to find the Corporation is there too.
51	"Little Big Boss"	January 8, 1993
When Graves is arrested, Little Boss becomes head of the Corporation.
52	"Super T-Rex"	January 1, 1993
Little Boss is kicked out of the Corporation and befriends a monstrous sea dino. Meanwhile, Edison works on new armor for T-Rex.
