= Heron Communications =

Heron Communications Inc.
- Type: Subsidiary
- Industry: Production and Distribution
- Founded: 1984; 42 years ago
- Defunct: 1993; 33 years ago
- Fate: Ceased operations
- Parent: Heron International
- Subsidiaries: Heron Home Video; Media Home Entertainment; Hi-Tops Video; Fox Hills Video; The Nostalgia Merchant

Heron Communications was a production company, distributor and a subsidiary of Gerald Ronson's Heron International.

It owned various home video companies, including Heron Home Entertainment (formerly Videoform Pictures), which had a joint venture with PolyGram Video, Channel 5 Video.

In 1984, it bought out the American home video company Media Home Entertainment, also including The Nostalgia Merchant. In 1986, Heron expanded in the US with two new labels; children's-oriented Hi-Tops Video, and sell-through oriented label Fox Hills Video (with The Nostalgia Merchant now part of Fox Hills).

In 1987, Heron Communications teamed up with fledging film distributor Troma Entertainment to distribute nine films on videocassette through the Media label, and also became involved with Cox Video and executive producer Alan Landsburg to produce direct-to-video documentaries for the Fox Hills Video label.

That October, it entered into an agreement with NFL Films that would make Fox Hills the exclusive distributor for NFL Films Video titles. Elsewhere, Heron filed a lawsuit against American film producer/distributor The Vista Organization, charging that Vista, along with its chairman and president, with fraud and breach of contract involving Vista's then-recent merger with Carolco and subsequent transfer of video rights to Vista titles to International Video Entertainment (then partially owned by Carolco), including Maid to Order, Fright Night Part II, and Dudes.

Heron ultimately began to sell or close their video operations in the early 1990s, a side-effect of the fraud cases that took down their parent company, Heron International. Hi-Tops Video was sold to Western Publishing and integrated into their Golden Book Video label; Media continued operations into 1993, with their final releases being distributed by FoxVideo. Other Media and Hi-Tops titles were licensed to Video Treasures for a period in the early-to-mid 1990s.

== Filmography ==
=== As a production company ===
- Desire and Hell at Sunset Motel (1991) ... Production Company
- The Perfect Bride (1991) (TV) ... Production Company
- A Nightmare on Elm Street 5: The Dream Child (1989) ... Production Company (presents)
- The Adventures of Ronald McDonald: McTreasure Island (1989) (V) ... Production Company
- A Nightmare on Elm Street 4: The Dream Master (1988) ... Production Company (presents)
- The Hidden (1987) ... Production Company
- A Nightmare on Elm Street 3: Dream Warriors (1987) ... Production Company (presents)
- I Am Not a Freak (1987) (TV) ... Production Company (as Heron Communications Inc.)
- The Ladies Club (1986) ... Production Company
- A Nightmare on Elm Street Part 2: Freddy's Revenge (1985) ... Production Company (presents)
- A Stranger Is Watching (1982) ... Production Company

=== As a distributor ===
- Il cacciatore di squali (1979) ... Distributor (1987) (USA) (VHS)
- Flight to Mars (1951) ... Distributor (1987) (USA) (VHS)
- The Set-Up (1949) ... Distributor (1987) (USA) (VHS)

== Assets ==
- Media Home Entertainment (1978–1993)
- Hi-Tops Video (1984–1993)
- The Nostalgia Merchant (1978-)
- Fox Hills Video (1986–1992)
- Channel 5 Video (joint venture with PolyGram) (1986-1992)
