= Maxie's World =

American children's television series

- Developed by: Phil Harnage
- Directed by: Marek Buchwald (director); Paul Quinn (voice direction)
- Composers: Haim Saban; Shuki Levy
- Country of origin: United States
- Original language: English
- No. of seasons: 1
- No. of episodes: 32

Production
- Executive producer: Andy Heyward
- Producer: Cassandra Schafhausen
- Running time: 15 minutes (with commercials)
- Production company: DIC Animation City

Original release
- Network: Syndication
- Release: September 18 (U.S.) – October 30, 1989 (U.S.)

Maxie's World is an American animated children's television program produced by DIC Animation City. Distributed by Claster Television and Saban International and originally aired in first-run syndication in the United States from September 18 to October 30, 1989, it consists of one season, comprising a total of 32 episodes, each 15 minutes long. In the series' original run, Maxie's World alternated on weekdays with Beverly Hills Teens and It's Punky Brewster. The series was briefly rerun on USA Network in 1994.

Developed for television by Phil Harnage, and executive produced by Andy Heyward, the series was conceived as a tie-in to the Hasbro line of "Maxie" fashion dolls. The title character Maxie is a straight-"A" student, cheerleader, and surfer girl, who attends Surfside High School in California. In addition to her life as a "typical" teenager, she routinely finds adventure solving crimes and investigating mysteries as host of her own TV show.

== Premise ==
The series takes place in the fictional seaside town of "Surfside" and follows the adventures of teenager Maxie and her circle of friends. She attends Surfside High School where she is a popular straight "A" student, cheerleader and surfer girl, while after school, she serves as host and investigative reporter of her own eponymous talk show Maxie's World. Through her work as a journalist, she routinely finds herself called upon to investigate mysteries and solve crimes, bringing the perpetrators to justice. Frequently accompanying Maxie in her adventures is her boyfriend, Rob, a handsome and popular football and soccer star at Surfside High.

Additional members of Maxie's circle of friends include Ashley, Carly and Simone, while male friends Mushroom and Ferdie routinely provide the series with its slapstick comedy elements. Providing much of the series' conflict is Jeri, who is envious of Maxie and is often shown manipulating events to humiliate the TV star in an attempt to sabotage her career and get her own TV show. In addition to the comedy and mystery elements, the series occasionally takes the opportunity to address more serious issues, including one episode which deals with the issue of teenage smoking, and another, which deals with the issue of eating disorders.

== Voice cast ==
- Loretta Jafelice as Maxie
- Simon Reynolds as Rob
- Geoff Kahnert as Mushroom
- Yannick Bisson as Ferdie
- Suzanne Coy as Simone
- Susan Roman as Ashley
- Tara Strong as Carly Cooper (credited as Tara Charendoff)
- John Stocker as Mr. Garcia
- Nadine Rabinovitch as Jeri Jeffries
- Diane Fabian as Additional Voices
- Gary Krawford as Additional Voices
- Greg Swanson as Additional Voices

== Episodes ==
No.	Title	Written by	Original release date
1	"Date Expectations"	Judy Rothman	September 18, 1989
Maxie and the girls reminisce about Maxie's first date with Rob, which includes a series of comical misadventures, ultimately resulting in true romance.
2	"Ride for Your Life"	Phil Harnage	September 19, 1989
Maxie and Rob begin to witness suspicious occurrences when a mysterious tall dark man attempts to sabotage the rides at the local amusement park.
3	"Wheelie Bad Dudes"	Jack Olesker	September 20, 1989
Maxie's wheelchair-using assistant helps foil bike thieves. Luckily, they have the help of a wheelchair handicap boy named Cliff, the new production assistant to help them.
4	"The Not-So Great Outdoors"	David Ehrman; Sean Roche	September 21, 1989
Maxie and the Surfside teens find outdoor adventure and healthy competition when they divide into teams of boys versus girls for a weekend camping trip.
5	"Goodbye Ghoul World"	Phil Harnage	September 22, 1989
Maxie and the Surfside teens are called in to investigate a haunted cruise ship, the "S.S. Lady Luck" after passengers are frightened by visions of ghosts.
6	"This Rap's for You"	Mike O'Mahony	September 25, 1989
An exchange student comes to Surfside and Mushroom and Ferd give him a rock star/rapper makeover in exchange for him helping them pass their classes.
7	"To Be or Not To Be Ferdie"	Kevin O'Donnell; Cassandra Schafhausen	September 26, 1989
Ferd tries to impress Jeri by changing his attitude and image.
8	"Misadventures in Babysitting"	Martha Moran	September 27, 1989
Maxie and Simone find themselves unwittingly involved in a jewel heist after two bumbling thieves hide their ill-gotten loot in Maxie's nephew's diaper bag.
9	"Breaking Up is Hard to Do"	Jack Olesker	September 28, 1989
Carly runs away when her parents get divorced.
10	"Fat Chance"	Phil Harnage	September 29, 1989
Maxie and the Surfside teens participate in a swimsuit fashion show, prompting Ashley to experience body dysmorphic disorder and go on a crash diet.
11	"The Maxie Horror Picture Show"	Pat Allee; Ben Hurst	October 2, 1989
Maxie and the Surfside teens begin experiencing unexplained phenomenon when they decide to produce a horror film inside an old abandoned mansion.
12	"The Phantom Artists"	Anthony Adams; Christina Adams	October 3, 1989
Maxie and the Surfside teens take matters into their own hands when the mysterious "Graffiti Squad" goes on a rampage vandalizing Surfside's landmarks.
13	"Two Guys for Every Girl"	Betty G. Birney	October 4, 1989
Carly finds herself at an indecision when two boys ask her to the prom.
14	"Ashes To Ashley"	Eleanor Burian-Mohr; Jack Hanrahan	October 5, 1989
Ashley decides to begin smoking cigarettes believing it will help her appear to be more sophisticated.
15	"A Day in the Life of Rob"	Richard Glatzer	October 6, 1989
Rob begins exhibiting symptoms of stress and fatigue after over-committing himself to schoolwork, sports, and various other extra-curricular activities.
16	"Surfside Over the Rainbow"	Jack Olesker	October 9, 1989
In a spoof to The Wizard of Oz, Maxie dreams of a faraway land where she finds sapphire sneakers, a dog named Tutu, the Wicked Witch of the Southwest, and the Wizard of Surf TV.
17	"Very Superstitious"	Richard Glatzer	October 10, 1989
Maxie attempts to free Rob of his superstitions when the chef responsible for his "lucky pizza" moves away, causing Rob to become insecure and frightened.
18	"I Was a Teenage Council Member"	Doug Molitor	October 11, 1989
The teens take on city council positions, but everything goes haywire when a blizzard hits Surfside.
19	"Mushroom and Ferdie's Hysterical Historical Adventure"	Martha Moran	October 12, 1989
Mushroom and Ferdie dream of encounters with a series of legendary historical figures during an all-night study session for their Women's Studies class.
20	"Pirouettes and Forward Passes"	Betty G. Birney	October 13, 1989
When Maxie reviews the school's ballet program, it is revealed that football player, Chad is a ballet dancer. When the team makes fun of him, Maxie and the coach have to show them how much they need Chad, as well as how ballet skills transfer to football.
21	"Friend or UFO?"	David Molitor	October 16, 1989
Maxie and the Surfside teens begin to witness UFO sightings after Jeri devises a scheme to undermine Maxie's credibility and start her own TV show.
22	"Photo Opportunity"	Jack Hanrahan; Eleanor Burian-Mohr	October 17, 1989
Maxie and the Surfside teens reminisce about their previous school photos, in anticipation of taking their first class photo with the entire gang present.
23	"Do or Diary"	Jack Olesker	October 18, 1989
After a late night finishing a science paper, Jeri accidentally turns her paper, news report, and diary professing feelings for Ferdie to the wrong places.
24	"Beach Blanket Battle"	Jack Olesker	October 19, 1989
Maxie and the Surfside teens meet the Beverly Hills Teens who pay a visit to Surfside in order to compete in the "Beach Blanket Battle" charity challenge.
25	"Teaching an Old Teacher New Tricks"	David Ehrman; Sean Roche	October 20, 1989
Mr. Winchell, an elderly teacher at Surfside is told that he must retire at the end of the year after the principal decides his teaching methods are out of date.
26	"Hero Word-Ship"	Celia Bonaduce	October 22, 1989
Rob meets his idol movie star Rocky Catalina, fantasizing about quitting school to be like him when Rocky brushes off education as a waste of time.
27	"Dear Hunk"	Betty G. Birney	October 23, 1989
Ferd and Mushroom start a Dear Hunk advice column for school, but their advice has disastrous results.
28	"The Slumber Party"	Martha Moran	October 24, 1989
Jeri's plan has unintended consequences when she throws a slumber party and attempts to recruit Mushroom and Ferdie to humiliate Maxie and her friends.
29	"A Dog's Tale"	Lisa Maliani; Margaret Belgrade	October 25, 1989
Maxie and her friends try to cheer up Simone, who is distraught after the death of her pet dog Otto.
30	"The Five Finger Discount"	David Ehrman; Sean Roche	October 26, 1989
Carly has a little sister from a big sister program, Melissa Johnson. To thank her, Melissa starts stealing gifts from Mr. Figgs Discount Emporium where her mother works.
31	"True Brit"	Robin Lyons; Andrew Oliver	October 29, 1989
Rob's British cousin Charlie comes to visit, causing misunderstandings.
32	"Future Schlock"	Judy Rothman	October 30, 1989
Maxie and the Surfside teens get their career aptitude test results, prompting Maxie to fantasize about an assortment of potentially suitable career paths.

== Home media ==
In 1990, select episodes were released in the United States on 30-minute, 60-minute, and 120 minute NTSC VHS tapes by Celebrity Home Entertainment's Just for Kids Mini Features line. Beginning in 1991, select episodes were released in the United Kingdom on 30-minute, 60-minute, and 90-minute PAL VHS tapes by Abbey Home Entertainment. The series was distributed by Claster Television, which was owned by Hasbro, the makers of the "Maxie" dolls.

Mill Creek Entertainment released Maxie's World - The Complete Series on DVD in Region 1 for the very first time in October 2015.

=== UK VHS releases ===
- Abbey Home Media (and Tempo Super Video) (April 15, 1991 – May 6, 1991)

=== Australia VHS release ===
- Pickwick Video and Abbey Home Media (1991)

== Crossover with Beverly Hills Teens ==
The Beverly Hills Teens made a crossover appearance in the Maxie's World episode "Beach Blanket Battle", where they visit Surfside High School to compete in a "Charity Challenge" against Maxie and her friends. As it is a crossover episode, certain elements of the Beverly Hills Teens character designs (such as hair color) were altered to help distinguish the Beverly Hills Teens from their Maxie's World counterparts.

== Maxie toyline ==
The "Maxie" toyline was conceived by Hasbro in 1986 after second-year sales of its fashion doll, Jem, did not live up to the toy company's expectations. In March 1988, Maxie, an 11½-inch tall, blonde-haired, blue-eyed, "All-American" teenage fashion doll was introduced onto toy store shelves, and was described as a competitor to Mattel's Barbie. For the launch, Hasbro had reportedly spent an estimated 70% of its annual advertising budget ($7 million) marketing the new doll.

In addition to the television series tie-in, promotion consisted of live presentations and television advertisements which starred Brooke Theiss as the live model. Commercials would typically feature the Maxie doll at school or various other activities, then switch to Theiss as the "real life" Maxie, which Hasbro vice president of public relations and promotions, Wayne Charness, described at the time as "innovative advertising for a fashion doll". By October 1988, sales of Maxie were said to be strong.

The Maxie doll was typically priced between $5.50–$13 (approximately $10–$25 in 2013 currency) which was considered a slightly more affordable price range than Mattel's Barbie, the #1 selling fashion doll at the time. In contrast to Barbie, who, by that time, had evolved into more "adult" careers and endeavors, Maxie was marketed as a teenaged high school student and was available in several variations, including numerous beach-themed "Makin' Waves" and "Sun Splash", "Cheerleader", "Slumber Party", "Ballerina", "Hula Hoop", and "Perfect Prom".

Also available as part of the toyline was Maxie's boyfriend, "Rob", and her best friends, blonde "Carly", redhead "Ashley", and African American "Kristen" (later renamed "Simone" in keeping with the television series). Accessories for Maxie included her horse, Tiffany, a sailboat play set, a locker and shower play set, a Surf Watchin' lifeguard play set, and a hot tub and patio play set, as well as "Fancy Face" makeup for her and "Mix 'n Match" and "Cool 'n Classy" fashion lines. Additional merchandise included Maxie paper dolls, coloring books and lunch boxes.

In 1989, Mattel answered Maxie with the introduction of Barbie's teenage cousin, Jazzie, her boyfriend, Dude, and her friends, Chelsie and Stacie. Similar to Mattel's introduction of Barbie and the Rockers which was credited, in part, for the demise of Jem and the Holograms, the introduction of Jazzie was described as delivering the "coup de grâce" to Maxie and, in January 1990, Hasbro decided to discontinue the Maxie toyline.
