= Barbie and the Sensations: Rockin' Back to Earth =

1987 television special directed by Bernard Deyriès

- VHS cover
- Genre: Adventure; Musical; Science fiction
- Written by: Bill Dubay; Martha Moran; Ruth Handler
- Directed by: Bernard Deyriès
- Starring: Sharon Lewis
- Music by: Haim Saban; Shuki Levy
- Country of origin: United States
- Original language: English

Production
- Producers: Eric S. Rollman; Andy Heyward
- Running time: 30 minutes
- Production companies: DIC Animation City; Saban Productions; Mattel

Original release
- Network: Syndication
- Release: February 26, 1988

Related
- Barbie and the Rockers: Out of This World

Barbie and the Sensations: Rockin' Back to Earth is a 1988 American animated television special and the sequel to Barbie and the Rockers: Out of This World. Both films were released together by Hi-Tops Video in February 1988 (one of Hi-Top's first releases with closed-captioning).

== Plot ==
Following their concert for world peace in outer space, Barbie and her band the Rockers are going back home. During the trip back to Earth, the band's space shuttle inadvertently enters a time warp. Upon landing at an airport, they meet Dr. Merrihew and his daughter Kim and soon learn that they have been transported back to 1959. The band then decides to go on a tour around the city alongside Kim, performing at several spots. After a performance at Cape Canaveral, Dr. Merrihew helps Barbie and the Rockers return to their time. Back in the present, they stage a big concert in New York City, where Barbie is reunited with an adult Kim and introduced to her daughter Megan.

== Songs ==
- "Rockin Back"
- "Dressin Up"
- "Do You Wanna Dance?"
- "Here Comes My Baby"
- "Blue Jean Boy"
- "Everybody Rock Reprise"
- "Ending titles"

== UK VHS releases ==
UK VHS releases
| VHS title | Label | Release date | Episodes | Notes |
|---|---|---|---|---|
| Barbie – Rockin' Back to Earth | Channel 5 | 1988 | Rockin' Back to Earth | |
| Barbie and the Sensations: Rockin' Back to Earth | MIA Video | November 21, 1989 | Rockin' Back to Earth; Out of This World | |
| Barbie - Two Excellent Adventures | MIA Video | 1992 | Rockin' Back to Earth; Out of This World | |
| Barbie Double Bill | MIA Video | October 1994 | Rockin' Back to Earth; Out of This World | |
