= Christopher Gaze =

British actor

Christopher Gaze MBE CM OBC MSM
- Born: Guildford, Surrey, England
- Occupations: Actor; host; director
- Years active: 1973–present

Christopher Gaze is an English–Canadian actor, host, artist, theatre and opera director residing in Vancouver, British Columbia, Canada.

== Early life and education ==
Born in Guildford, Surrey, England, Gaze trained at the Bristol Old Vic Theatre School before coming to Canada in 1975, spending three seasons at the Shaw Festival. He met his first wife, Merrilyn Gann, in 1978 at the Northern Lights Theatre in Edmonton, Alberta, while performing lunchtime theatre.

== Career ==
Gaze moved to Vancouver in 1983 and in 1990 founded Bard on the Beach which in 2014 achieved attendance exceeding 100,000. In addition to performing and directing for Bard, Gaze's voice is heard regularly in cartoon series, commercials and on the radio. He also hosts Vancouver Symphony's popular Tea and Trumpets series and their annual Christmas concerts. His many honours include induction into the BC Entertainment Hall of Fame, Canada's Meritorious Service Medal (2004), Honorary Doctorates from UBC & SFU, the BC Community Achievement Award (2007), the Gold Medallion from the Children's Theatre Foundation of America (2007), a Jessie Award for Best Supporting Actor for his performance in Equus at The Playhouse, the Vancouver Mayor's Arts Award for Theatre (2011), the Order of British Columbia (2012), The King Charles III Coronation Medal (2025), the Order of Canada (2026), and Member of the Order of the British Empire (2026).

As an Olympic ambassador, Gaze was honored to run with the Olympic flame for the 2010 Games. A public speaker with the National Speakers Bureau, Gaze frequently shares his insights on Shakespeare and theatre with students, service organizations and businesses.

Gaze also narrated season 3 of Emmy Award-winning animation series Madeline (after Christopher Plummer stepped down).

Additionally, he has also performed voiceover roles for animation, most notably as Turaga Vakama in the first three Bionicle movies, as well as Diagnostic Drone in Beast Machines and Major Mint in Barbie in the Nutcracker.

His memoir, The Road to Bard, was published by Harbour Publishing in May 2026.

== Filmography ==
=== Film ===
Year	Title	Role	Notes
1983	Running Brave	Aussie Sportscaster	
1990	Deep Sleep	Grey-Haired Man	
1993	Cool Runnings	British Official	
1997	The Fearless Four	Narrator	English version
1998	Mummies Alive! The Legend Begins		Voice, direct-to-video
2000	Grandma Got Run Over by a Reindeer	Quincy	Voice, direct-to-video
2001	Barbie in the Nutcracker	Major Mint	Voice, direct-to-video
2002	Barbie as Rapunzel	King Wilhelm	Voice, direct-to-video
2003	Bionicle: Mask of Light	Turaga Vakama	Voice, direct-to-video
2004	Bionicle 2: Legends of Metru Nui	Turaga Vakama (Narrator)	Voice, direct-to-video
2005	Bionicle 3: Web of Shadows	Turaga Vakama (Narrator)	Voice, direct-to-video
2006	Barbie Fairytopia: Mermaidia	Fungus Maximus	Voice, direct-to-video
2006	Barbie in the 12 Dancing Princesses	King Randolph	Voice
2007	Barbie Fairytopia: Magic of the Rainbow	Fungus Maximus	Voice
2007	Barbie as the Island Princess	Sagi	Voice
2007	The Ten Commandments	Aaron	
2009	Stranger with My Face	Henry	
2009	Sing Along with Barbie	Additional voices	Voice
2014	Hattie's Heist	Archie	
2025	LOOT: A Story of Crime and Redemption	Douglas Latchford	Voice

=== Television ===
- Action Man - additional voices
- Beast Machines - Diagnostic Drone
- Captain N: The Game Master - additional voices
- Class of the Titans - Zeus
- The Fearless Four - The Narrator
- Hero: 108 - Fox King
- Kid vs. Kat - Mr. Cheeks
- The Little Prince - The Aviator (episode: "The New Mission")
- Los Luchadores - Rupert (episode: "Anxiety Attacks")
- MacGyver - Phil Sternwise (episode: "The Visitor")
- Madeline - The Narrator
- Milo's Bug Quest - The Narrator
- My Little Pony: Friendship Is Magic - General Seaspray
- Ninja Turtles: The Next Mutation - Dragon Lord
- Pocket Dragon Adventures - The Wizard
- ReBoot - Hue Branch (episode: "Firewall")
- Sabrina's Secret Life - additional voices
- Spider-Man Unlimited - Bromley
- Stargate SG-1 - Tevaris (episode: "The Shroud")
- Super Team Canada - Mr. Redgwell

=== Video games ===
- Barbie as the Island Princess - Sagi
- Dragon Tales: Learn & Fly With Dragons - Mr. Dustfree
- Marvel Nemesis: Rise of the Imperfects - voice of Magneto
