= List of awards and nominations received by James Earl Jones =

James Earl Jones awards and nominations
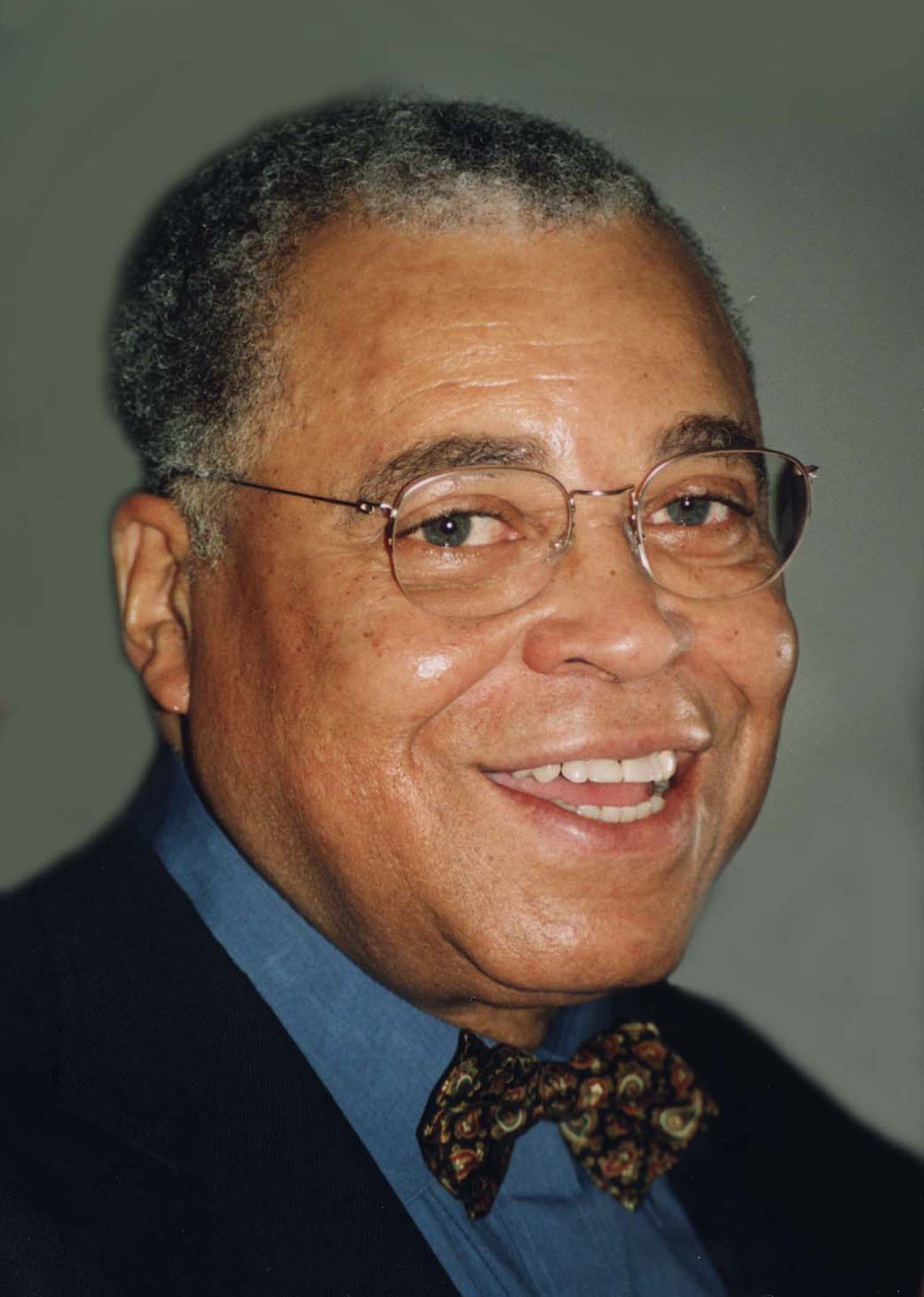
- Jones in 2001
Awards and nominations
Award	Wins	Nominations
Academy Awards	1	2
Emmy Awards	4	11
Golden Globe Awards	1	5
Grammy Awards	1	3
Screen Actors Guild Awards	0	1
Tony Awards	2	4

Totals (Note: Certain award groups do not simply award one winner. They acknowledge several different recipients, have runners-up, and have third place. Since this is a specific recognition and is different from losing an award, runner-up mentions are considered wins in this award tally. For simplification and to avoid errors, each award in this list has been presumed to have had a prior nomination.)
- Wins: 43
- Nominations: 78

This article is a List of awards and nominations received by James Earl Jones.

James Earl Jones was an American actor known for his roles on stage and screen. Jones was known as one of the few entertainers to have won the EGOT (Emmy, Grammy, Oscar, Tony). Jones received four Emmy Awards, a Grammy Award and three Tony Awards. While Jones never won a competitive Oscar, he was presented with the Honorary Academy Award in 2011 by Ben Kingsley.

Jones received an Academy Award nomination for Best Actor for The Great White Hope (1970). He was nominated for the Golden Globe Award for Claudine (1974), the Screen Actors Guild Award for his role in Cry, the Beloved Country (1995) and the Independent Spirit Award for Matewan (1987). He gained worldwide recognition for voicing Darth Vader in the George Lucas space opera Star Wars films (1977–present) and for Mufasa in the Walt Disney animated film The Lion King (1994). He also acted in films such as Dr. Strangelove (1964), Conan the Barbarian (1982), Coming to America (1988), Field of Dreams (1989), The Hunt for Red October (1990), The Sandlot (1990), Patriot Games (1992), and Sneakers (1992).

For his work in the theatre, he received four competitive Tony Award nominations for Best Actor in a Play winning twice for his originating the roles of boxer Jack Jefferson in Howard Sackler's The Great White Hope in 1969 and as a working class father Troy Maxson in August Wilson's Fences in 1987. He was Tony-nominated for playing part of an aging couple in a revival of the Ernest Thompson play On Golden Pond (2005), and an Ex-President in the Gore Vidal revival The Best Man (2012). In 2017 he received a Special Tony Award for Lifetime Achievement in the Theatre at the 71st Tony Awards. He also won six Drama Desk Awards, three Outer Critics Circle Awards, and a Theater World Award.

For his work in television he received eight Primetime Emmy Award nominations winning twice for Outstanding Supporting Actor in a Limited Series or Movie for Heat Wave and for Outstanding Lead Actor in a Drama Series for Gabriel's Fire both in 1991. He was Emmy-nominated for his roles in East Side West Side (1963), By Dawn's Early Light (1990), Picket Fences (1994), Under One Roof (1995), Frasier (1997), and Everwood (2004). He also has been nominated for three Grammy Awards winning in 1977 for Best Spoken Word Album for Great American Documents.

Over his career he received several honorary awards including the National Medal of the Arts in 1992, the Kennedy Center Honors in 2002, the Screen Actors Guild Life Achievement Award in 2009, and the Academy Honorary Awards in 2011.

== Major awards ==
=== Academy Awards ===
Year	Category	Nominated work	Result	Ref.
1970	Best Actor	The Great White Hope	Nominated	
2011	Honorary Award	—N/a	Honored	

=== Emmy Awards ===
Year	Category	Nominated work	Result	Ref.
Primetime Emmy Awards
1963	Outstanding Guest Actor in a Drama Series	East Side/West Side	Nominated	
1990	Outstanding Supporting Actor in a Miniseries	By Dawn's Early Light	Nominated	
1991	Outstanding Supporting Actor in a Miniseries	Heat Wave	Won	
1991	Outstanding Actor in a Drama Series	Gabriel's Fire	Won	
1994	Outstanding Guest Actor in a Drama Series	Picket Fences	Nominated	
1995	Outstanding Supporting Actor in a Drama Series	Under One Roof	Nominated	
1997	Outstanding Guest Actor in a Comedy Series	Frasier	Nominated	
2004	Outstanding Guest Actor in a Drama Series	Everwood	Nominated	
Daytime Emmy Awards
1988	Outstanding Performer in Children's Programming	CBS Schoolbreak Special	Nominated	
2000	Outstanding Performer in Children's Special	Summer's End	Won	
New York Emmy Awards
1963	Individuals	Stage Two	Won	

=== Golden Globe Awards ===
Year	Category	Nominated work	Result	Ref.
1970	Most Promising Newcomer - Male	The Great White Hope	Won	
1970	Best Actor in a Motion Picture – Drama	The Great White Hope	Nominated	
1974	Best Actor in a Motion Picture– Musical or Comedy	Claudine	Nominated	
1990	Best Actor in a Television Series - Drama	Gabriel's Fire	Nominated	
1991	Best Actor in a Television Series - Drama	Pros and Cons	Nominated	

=== Grammy Awards ===
Year	Category	Nominated work	Result	Ref.
1970	Best Spoken Word	The Great White Hope	Nominated	
1977	Best Spoken Word	Great American Documents	Won	
2001	Best Spoken Word for Children	The Christmas Miracle of Jonathan Toomey	Nominated	

=== Screen Actors Guild Awards ===
Year	Category	Nominated work	Result	Ref.
1995	Outstanding Actor in a Leading Role	Cry, the Beloved Country	Nominated	
2009	Lifetime Achievement Award	—N/a	Honored	

=== Tony Awards ===
Year	Category	Nominated work	Result	Ref.
1969	Best Actor in a Play	The Great White Hope	Won	
1987	Best Actor in a Play	Fences	Won	
2005	Best Actor in a Play	On Golden Pond	Nominated	
2012	Best Actor in a Play	The Best Man	Nominated	
2017	Special Tony Award	—N/a	Honored	

== Other theatre awards ==
Organizations	Year	Category	Work	Result	Ref.
Drama Desk Awards	1965	Vernon Rice Award	Othello	Won	
Drama Desk Awards	1969	Distinguished Performance	The Great White Hope	Won	
Drama Desk Awards	1971	Distinguished Performance	Les Blancs	Won	
Drama Desk Awards	1973	Distinguished Performance	The Cherry Orchard	Won	
Drama Desk Awards	1973	Distinguished Performance	Hamlet	Won	
Drama Desk Awards	1978	Outstanding Actor in a Play	Paul Robeson	Nominated	
Drama Desk Awards	1987	Outstanding Actor in a Play	Fences	Won	
Drama Desk Awards	2008	Special Award		Honored	
Outer Critics Circle Awards	1987	Outstanding Actor in a Play	Fences	Won	
Outer Critics Circle Awards	2005	Outstanding Actor in a Play	On Golden Pond	Nominated	
Outer Critics Circle Awards	2008	Outstanding Featured Actor in a Play	Cat on a Hot Tin Roof	Won	
Outer Critics Circle Awards	2012	Outstanding Featured Actor in a Play	The Best Man	Won	
Theatre World Awards	1962	Distinguished Performance	Moon on a Rainbow Shawl	Won	

== Miscellaneous accolades ==
Organizations	Year	Category	Work	Result	Ref.
Black Reel Award	2000	Best Supporting Actor - Network or Cable	Santa and Pete	Nominated	
Black Reel Award	2016	Best Actor - Limited Series or TV Movie	Driving Miss Daisy	Nominated	
Black Reel Award	2020	Best Voice Performance	The Lion King	Nominated	
CableACE Awards	1987	Actor in a Comedy Series	Faerie Tale Theatre	Nominated	
CableACE Awards	1991	Actor in a Dramatic Series	American Playwrights Theater	Won	
CableACE Awards	1991	Supporting Actor in a Miniseries or Movie	Heat Wave	Won	
Critics' Choice Television Awards	2014	Best Guest Performer in a Comedy Series	The Big Bang Theory	Nominated	
Independent Spirit Award	1987	Best Supporting Actor	Matewan	Nominated	
Kansas City Film Critics Circle	1995	Best Actor	Cry My Beloved Country	Won	
NAACP Image Award	1975	Outstanding Actor in a Motion Picture	Claudine	Won	
NAACP Image Award	1989	Outstanding Supporting Actor in a Motion Picture	Field of Dreams	Nominated	
NAACP Image Award	1993	Outstanding Lead Actor in a Drama Series	Gabriel's Fire	Won	
NAACP Image Award	1996	Outstanding Performance in a Children's Special	Happily Ever After	Nominated	
NAACP Image Award	1996	Outstanding Lead Actor in a Motion Picture	Cry My Beloved Country	Nominated	
NAACP Image Award	1998	Outstanding Guest Actor in a Comedy Series	Frasier	Nominated	
NAACP Image Award	2020	Outstanding Character Voice Performance	The Lion King	Nominated	

== Honorary awards ==
Organizations	Year	Notes	Result	Ref.
National Medal of Arts	1992	Medal	Honored	
National Board of Review	1995	Career Achievement Award	Honored	
Kennedy Center Honors	2002	Medal	Honored	
Screen Actors Guild Awards	2009	Life Achievement Award	Honored	
Chicago Film Critics Association	2011	Oscar Micheaux Award	Honored	
Academy of Motion Picture Arts and Sciences	2011	Academy Honorary Award	Honored	
