= The Doctor Is In =

The Doctor Is In may refer to:

== Television episodes ==
- "The Doctor Is In" (Big Bad Beetleborgs)
- "The Doctor Is In" (Braceface)
- "The Doctor Is In" (Crash)
- "The Doctor Is In" (Dark Justice)
- "The Doctor Is In" (Everwood)
- "The Doctor Is In" (Ruby)
- "The Doctor Is In" (Rugrats)

== Other uses ==
- ECW The Doctor is In, a 1996 professional wrestling event promoted by Extreme Championship Wrestling
- "The Doctor Is In", a 2007 story arc in the comics series Sinister Dexter
- The Doctor Is In, a 1977 album by Ben Sidran
- "Doctor Is In", a song by Hoodoo Gurus from Kinky (2005 re-release)
- The Doctor Is In, a 2011 compilation album by Kool Keith
- "The Doctor Is In", a former weekly segment, presented by Lise Van Susteren, of the radio program The Paul Berry Show

== See also ==
- The Doctor Is In... and Out, a 1974 album by Yusef Lateef
- "The Doctor Is In... Deep", an episode of Melrose Place
- The Doctor Is Out (disambiguation)
