= Brian Palmer (motivational speaker) =

Brian Palmer is an American Speakers Bureau Executive and the president of National Speakers Bureau in Libertyville, Illinois. He joined the National Speakers Bureau as a salesperson in 1980 and was made president in 1996, succeeding his father, John Palmer. Brian Palmer recently celebrated his 30th anniversary with National Speakers Bureau.

Palmer has authored articles for Source Magazine of the Florida Society of Association Executives, Speaker Magazine, and The Meeting Professional. He has also contributed to, and been quoted by, many other publications, including The Wall Street Journal, The New York Times, the Chicago Tribune, the Herald Tribune, Crain’s Chicago Business, the Orlando Sentinel, Speaker Magazine, and The Meeting Professional. Palmer is a contributing author of the 5th Edition of Professional Meeting Management.

An active member of several meeting industry organizations, Palmer has served on the boards of Meeting Professionals International and the International Association of Speakers Bureaus. For several years he chaired the National Speakers Association/International Association of Speakers Bureaus Joint Task Force, charged with developing the relationship between professional speakers and speakers bureaus.

For the 2013-14 fiscal year Palmer was the President of the International Association of Speakers Bureaus.

In recognition of Palmer's service, Meeting Professionals International gave him the International Supplier of the Year Award in 2003. In 2005, the International Association of Speakers Bureaus honored Palmer with the John Palmer Award. Also in 2005, he received the Meeting Partner of the Year Award from the National Speakers Association.

In 2008, Palmer chaired the task force that was charged with the mission of creating a code of conduct for the International Association of Speakers Bureaus, as well as a manner of enforcement of this code of ethics.
