= De Novo Dahl =

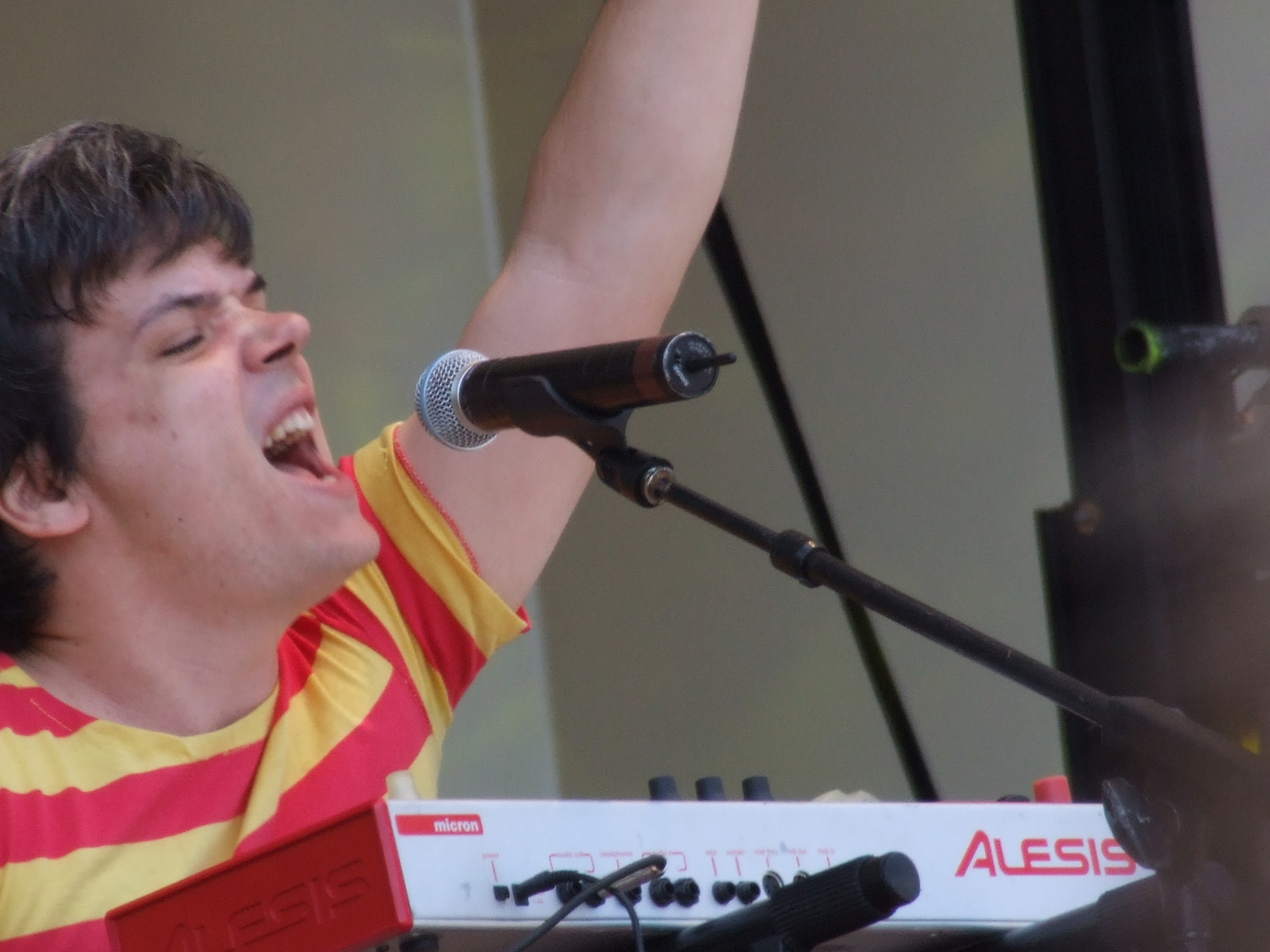
- Keyboardist Matthew Hungate at Lollapalooza 2008

Background information
- Origin: Murfreesboro, Tennessee
- Genres: Neo-psychedelia; Indie rock
- Years active: 2001-present
- Label: Roadrunner Records
- Members: Joel McAnulty a.k.a. Joel Dahl (Vocals, Guitar); Serai Zaffiro (Vocals, Omnichord); Keith Lowen (Bass Guitar); Matthew Hungate (Keyboards); Joey Andrews a.k.a. Mixta Huxtable (Drums)
- Past members: Mark Bond (Keyboards, Vocals); Derek 'Sandy' Sandidge (Guitar, Vocals); Dave Carney (Bass, Vocals); Arlo Hall (Keyboards)
- Website: www.denovodahl.com

De Novo Dahl is an Indie rock group from Murfreesboro, Tennessee. Formed in 2001, they were signed to Roadrunner Records and released from their contract in 2009. They are currently signed to Theory 8 Records.

== History ==
The band was formed in 2001 by Joel Dahl, Serai Zaffiro, Derek Sandidge, Joey Andrews, Jon Schneck (later replaced by David Carney), and Mark Bond. The band took their name from the Latin words for "The New" and the last name of author Roald Dahl. Keyboardist Mark Bond left the group amicably in 2006 and now plays keyboard for The Features. He was replaced by Matthew Hungate. The group signed to Roadrunner Records in 2007. In 2008, the band was asked by Warner Bros. to record a theme song for the film Speed Racer, but the song was rejected by the Wachowskis.

Members of De Novo Dahl appeared as a music group called Fall Formal in the 2008-released film Make-out with Violence. David Carney and Matthew Hungate also contributed to the music in the film.

== Lineup ==
- Joel McAnulty (a.k.a. Joel Dahl) - Vocals, Guitar
- Serai Zaffiro - Omnichord, Vocals
- Keith Lowen - Bass
- Matthew Hungate - Keyboard
- Joey Andrews (a.k.a. Mixta Huxtable) - Drums

=== Former members ===
- Mark Bond - Keyboard, Vocals (left 2006)
- Derek "Sandy" Sandidge - Guitar, Vocals (left 2006)
- Dave Carney - Bass, Vocals (left 2006)
- Arlo Hall - Keyboards (left 2007)

== Discography ==
=== Albums ===
- De Novo Dahl EP (2003, self release)
- Cats & Kittens (2005, Emergent Records)
- Move Every Muscle, Make Every Sound (2008, Roadrunner Records)
- City Driver (2009, Theory 8 Records)
- Bobby Thompson Reels, Vol. 1 (2010, Theory 8 Records)
- Tigerlion (2010, Theory 8 Records)

=== Singles ===
- "Sexy Come Lately" (2007)
- "Shout" (2008)
