= Loot: A Story of Crime and Redemption =

2025 documentary film

LOOT: A Story of Crime and Redemption
- Official poster
- Directed by: Don Millar
- Screenplay by: Don Millar; Ponita Keo; Makara Ouch; Ramesh Reddy
- Produced by: Cole Northey; Don Millar; Eric Hogan
- Cinematography: Peter Lee
- Edited by: Nick Ogden; Nicholas T. Shepard
- Music by: David Bertok
- Production company: New Theory Pictures
- Release date: 15 March 2025 (International Festival of Films on Art)
- Running time: 1 hr. 27 mins
- Country: Canada
- Languages: English, Khmer

LOOT: A Story of Crime and Redemption is a 2025 documentary film directed by Don Millar. The film investigates Cambodia's looted antiquities trade, focusing on figures like "Blue Tiger," a former child soldier turned restitution advocate, and U.S. Homeland Security agents like J.P. Labbat who dismantled British dealer Douglas Latchford’s network through Operation Indochina Peninsula Plunder.

The documentary follows Cambodia’s efforts to recover looted cultural artifacts, tracing a path from temple ruins in Cambodia to museums in London and New York. It highlights the disparity between local villagers who participated in the looting and the collectors and institutions who profited from the trade. Produced by New Theory Pictures (Canada), the film premiered at the International Festival of Films on Art (FIFA) in Montreal and was later acquired by Jambika Docs.

== Synopsis ==
LOOT is a documentary film examining the illicit trade in Cambodian antiquities and its connections to the international art market. The film profiles Douglas Latchford, a British collector and dealer accused of orchestrating the looting of Khmer temples during the Cambodian civil war. It includes interviews with former looters, Cambodian investigators, and U.S. officials involved in “Operation Indochina Peninsula Plunder,” which led to Latchford's indictment. The documentary also follows efforts to recover and repatriate artifacts, including pieces formerly held by the Metropolitan Museum of Art in New York. The film contrasts the high prices achieved for looted antiquities with the low wages and risks faced by local villagers involved in the original excavations.

== Cast ==
- Christopher Gaze as Douglas Latchford (voice)
- J.P. Labbat as Self
- Brad Gordon as Self
- Thanaren Than as Self
- Malia Politzer as Self
- Blue Tiger as Self

== Production ==
Director Don Millar's interest in the subject originated with the Pandora Papers investigation, produced by the International Consortium of Investigative Journalists, which linked numerous Cambodian relics to Douglas Latchford and to institutions such as the Metropolitan Museum of Art in New York.

Millar's approach to the film emphasizes firsthand testimony, framing the narrative through the voices of former looters such as "Blue Tiger," a onetime child soldier who now works with Cambodian authorities to repatriate stolen artifacts. Working with writers Ponita Keo and Makara Ouch, Millar aimed to portray these former looters with dignity, emphasizing their role in reclaiming Cambodia's heritage.

Millar also highlights the efforts of investigators engaged in dismantling the international trade in looted antiquities. Among them is J.P. Labbat, a Homeland Security agent who led Operation Indochina Peninsula Plunder, the investigation that ultimately resulted in the indictment of British art dealer Douglas Latchford. Labbat's work and Blue Tiger's story, in collaboration with Cambodian investigators and international restitution teams, are depicted as pivotal in tracing the illicit movement of artifacts and achieving major returns, including the repatriation of items from the Metropolitan Museum of Art in 2024.

The film was produced by Cole Northey, with an original score composed by David Bertok.

== Release ==
LOOT: A Story of Crime and Redemption had its world premiere on March 15, 2025, at the International Festival of Films on Art (FIFA) in Montreal, Canada. Later that month, it was screened at the Cambodia International Film Festival in Phnom Penh.

In June 2025, the documentary screened in competition at the Bali International Film Festival and was also included in the programme of the Doc Edge Film Festival in New Zealand.

In July 2025, the film was shown at the Center for Khmer Studies in partnership with the Bophana Center. In August 2025, it screened at Cambodia Town Film Festival.
