= Pocket Dragon Adventures =

1998 Spanish-American TV series or program

- DVD cover for "Brave as they can Be!"
- Also known as: Pocket Dragons Adventures; Pocket Dragons (Spanish)
- Genre: Children's adventure Animation; Fantasy
- Created by: Real Musgrave (original characters)
- Developed by: Craig Miller; Marv Wolfman
- Directed by: Antoni D'Ocón (earlier episodes); Kurt Weldon (later episodes)
- Starring: Ian James Corlett; Jason Gray-Stanford; Sam Vincent; Kathleen Barr; Tabitha St. Germain; Venus Terzo; Terry Klassen; Christopher Gaze; Robert O. Smith; Saffron Henderson
- Theme music composer: Matt McGuire; Sandy Howell; Laura Cerdan (Spanish)
- Composer: Matt McGuire
- Countries of origin: Spain; United States
- Original languages: Spanish; English
- No. of seasons: 2
- No. of episodes: 52 (104 segments)

Production
- Executive producers: Antoni D'Ocón; Craig Miller; Marv Wolfman; Kaaren Lee Brown; Andy Heyward; Robby London; Michael Maliani
- Producers: Antoni D'Ocón (earlier episodes); Kurt Weldon (later episodes)
- Production companies: D'Ocon Films Productions (Note: Animation outsourced to Animation Services Hong Kong, Hang Yang Production, Hong Ying Animation and Young Woo Production Co.); Televisión Española; Bohbot Entertainment; DIC Productions, L.P.

Original release
- Network: TVE1 (Spain); Syndication (BKN) (North America)
- Release: 1998 – 1999

Pocket Dragon Adventures (Spanish: Pocket Dragons) is an animated series produced by the Spanish animation studio D'Ocon Films Productions, in co-production with Televisión Española, Bohbot Entertainment, and DIC Productions. The series is based on the Pocket Dragons characters created by artist Real Musgrave, best known for the Pocket Dragons figurines also based on his work.

The series centers on the Pocket Dragons (a group of very small dragons) who live with a kindly old wizard, and their many adventures. The show premiered in the United States on the Bohbot Kids Network syndicated programming strand in early 1998.

The series was created by Craig Miller and Marv Wolfman, who also produced and story edited the series. Together or separately, they wrote over 40% of the total number of episodes. Pocket Dragon Adventures was also the first animated series signed to a labor contract with the Writers Guild of America.

== Synopsis ==
The setting is shown to be set in the Medieval era, with other elements thrown in, often bizarre ones (e.g., yellow-painted taxicabs pulled by rhinoceroses). Most episodes of the series include standard Medieval fare, such as armored knights, and some science fiction elements, such as flying saucers.

== Cast and characters ==
=== Pocket Dragons ===
- Filbert (voiced by Ian James Corlett) is the largest and oldest of the six Pocket Dragons, who wears a red bandanna around his neck, and assumes the role of leader, even though he is seldom in control of the others.
- Zoom-Zoom (voiced by Jason Gray-Stanford) is the fastest runner of the group, who wears an old-style aviator's helmet and wishes that he could fly, despite the Pocket Dragons' inability to fly.
- Specs (voiced by Samuel Vincent) is the bookworm of the group, who wears a pair of human-sized glasses balanced on his nose. He has a crush on the Princess.
- Scribbles (voiced by Kathleen Barr) is one of the two female dragons and a somewhat scatterbrained inventor whose creations tend to cause more problems than they solve. She and Specs disagree as to which of them is smarter. She wears a special quiver in which her trusty pogo-pencil is carried. Scribbles often fills in the leadership position when Filbert is incapacitated.
- Binky (voiced by Tabitha St. Germain) is the other female dragon, who is the smallest and youngest of the six dragons. In one episode, "Attack of the 50 Foot Binky", she wanted to be as tall as Filbert, so she used a growth potion and, because she did not put a limitation on it, and she gradually grew bigger until the others found the antidote. Despite her childlike qualities, she sometimes surprises the others with her competence and clear-headedness. She is the only one of the group who usually does not wear anything.
- Cuddles (voiced by Venus Terzo in Season 1 and Terry Klassen in Season 2) is a drowsy dragon who wears bedroom slippers and carries a pillow, and is usually shown sleeping. Sometimes when he sleeps, he "sleep-plays" that he is a daring adventurer named Sir Cuddles; he snaps out of this and wakes up whenever someone says "Cushladoo".

=== Other characters ===
- The Wizard (voiced by Christopher Gaze) is a kindly, avuncular wizard who watches over the Dragons and owns the castle in which they live. He tries to keep them from getting into too much trouble. An accomplished magician, he has a vast library and a laboratory in the castle.
- Library Cat is a winged cat who is the wizard's familiar and a helpful companion to the Pocket Dragons. The cat also wears spectacles.
- Theobearus is a living teddy bear, who occasionally aids the pocket dragons.
- Sparkles (voiced by Robert O. Smith) is a full-sized dragon who is not very bright. He is able to float through the air by inflating himself like a balloon.
- Princess Betty Bye Belle (voiced by Saffron Henderson) is the princess who runs the town library; when the former librarian retired, the Princess offered to let him live in the castle while she took over the library, because of her love of literature. She seems to be aware of Specs' feelings toward her, although she sees him more as a friend.
- Shmahz is a short wizard who hates the Dragons for disrupting his evil schemes and often tries to get revenge on them.
- Sir Nigel (voiced by Garry Chalk) is a full-sized dragon who is a friend of the Wizard and the Pocket Dragons. He is a figure of culture and learning.
- Trafalgar is a villainous full-sized dragon, who takes tips on how to be evil from his guidebook.
- The Pie-Rats are a trio of rodent thieves named Cuda, Wuda, and Shuda who specialise in stealing pastries.
- Gnorman the Gnome (voiced by Brian Drummond) is a bumbling, sometimes villainous, sometimes helpful character. The "G"'s in his name are not silent (it is pronounced "G-norman the G-nome"). His brother is called Gnasty and his sister is called Gnoxious.
- Chumley is Sir Nigel's bumbling artistic brother. He speaks with a Welsh accent and is based on a Welsh Dragon.

== Episodes ==
| No. | Title | Original release date |
|---|---|---|
| 1 | "Day for Knight / All Alone and Feeling Boo" | 1998 |
The Pocket Dragons aid Nigel from Sir Kenneth, by making the knight swear off dragon hunting forever.; In the Wizard's absence, the Pocket Dragons are attacked by shadow monsters, until Binky reverses the spell that brought them.
| 2 | "Zoom-Zoom's Wish / Gnome Alone" | 1998 |
The Pocket Dragons build a flying machine to fulfil Zoom-Zoom's desire to fly, but run into danger in the skies.; Gnorman and his gnome family evict the Pocket Dragons from the castle. While keeping the gnomes busy, Cuddles starts an incantation to remove them.
| 3 | "The Art of Magic / Never Wish Upon a Star" | 1998 |
Specs develops a crush on the new librarian Princess Betty Bye Belle, but is forced to duel the sorcerer Shmahz after a mishap.; The Wizard receives a mysterious star. The Pocket Dragons recklessly make several wishes with chaotic results until they start working together.
| 4 | "Stop! Pay Troll! / Whookerpop" | 1998 |
A troll named Hukamuk guards a river bridge for food. The Pocket Dragons and Wizard aid him to restore him to his true form and purify the tainted Lord Fermul who took his castle.; Sir Nigel and the Pocket Dragons seek the full-sized dragon, Sparkles. Sparkles is revealed to be a chaotic but friendly dragon, so the Pocket Dragons invite him to live with them.
| 5 | "Speed of Flight / Just Desserts" | 1998 |
Zoom-Zoom and Scribbles race to see who is faster. They compete until they get exhausted, but Cuddles wins the race instead.; The Pocket Dragons have a go at baking cookies, but create a cookie dough monster. As the situation gets out of hand, the Wizard comes to the rescue.
| 6 | "In Your Dream / Science Friction" | 1998 |
In his sleep, Cuddles is captured by the Grackul. Being brave in his sleep, Cuddles, aided by captured Tummygrumblies and the other Pocket Dragons, scare away the Grackul.; The Pocket Dragons construct a building machine for the science fair, but it goes haywire. Instead, they help with rebuilding a farmhouse.
| 7 | "A Harp Day's Night / It Came from Outer Space" | 1998 |
The Pocket Dragons visit Count Cornelius of Yakminster, but find the castle taken over by Gnorman's family. With Sparkles' help, they drive out the gnomes.; A space meteor has caused several insects to grow larger and hostile. The Pocket Dragons hold them off until the meteor loses its glow.
| 8 | "Sea Sickness / A Clear and Present Scribbles" | 1998 |
The Pocket Dragons journey to find the herbs needed to cure the Wizard's illness. They are met by the Pie-Rats, who, after a brief fight, aid them in their quest.; After a quarrel, Specs accidentally turns Scribbles invisible. While the Pocket Dragons try to catch her, Gnorman comes trying to persuade the Wizard to buy something from him.
| 9 | "The Unicorn Hunters / Down Deep" | 1998 |
The Pocket Dragons rescue a herd of unicorns from the gnome family. After a brief chase, Gnorman reveals that he was trying to befriend the unicorns to start a circus.; The Pocket Dragons find Binky in the dungeons and are met by the long-lost gargoyle, Gladstone. They help Gladstone overcome his vertigo to unite him with the other gargoyles.
| 10 | "Snow Job / A Rocky Friendship" | 1998 |
The Pocket Dragons and Sparkles tell four different stories to the Wizard of creating snow by magic and the presence of a snow monster. The Wizard also has his own story to tell.; A basilisk named Jewel is forced to turn creatures into stone as ornaments for the evil Duke Drake. The Pocket Dragons help Jewel free her hostage son and overthrow the duke.
| 11 | "A Cold, Cruel World / Pen Pals" | 1998 |
Thinking that the Wizard is going to get rid of them, the Pocket Dragons compete to impress him. The Wizard clears up this misunderstanding.; The Pocket Dragons travel with Betty Bye Bell to visit Scribbles' pen pal, Princess Gwendolyn, but end up in a tangle with Shmahz for a second time.
| 12 | "Pocket Dragons vs. the Flying Saucer / Minky Business" | 1998 |
An alien spaceman called Walter is on a mission to destroy the planet for his fianceé. The Pocket Dragons prevent Walter from staging an attack.; The Wizard duplicates Binky to make her a playmate, called Winky, but the spell creates a second evil duplicate named Minky as well.
| 13 | "Masquerade / Ducks Amok" | 1998 |
A gremlin named Carnuckle steals the Wizard's theatrical mask. Cuddles manages to stop him and Carnuckle reveals that getting the mask was his duty.; The Pocket Dragons try out a duplication spell, which makes the Wizard's bath duck, copy six times and cause trouble across the land, until the spell wears off.
| 14 | "Shmahz Strikes Again / The Nervous Novice" | 1998 |
The Pocket Dragons go to Crumbling Castle. With most of the dragons and the genie, Cookie, under Shmahz's control, it is down to Specs and Zoom-Zoom to rescue them.; The Wizard's new apprentice, Neezo, is a very good cook, but not such a good spellcaster. After failed attempts, Binky encourages him to pursue cooking.
| 15 | "A Dragon in This Dress / Malice with the Chalice" | 1998 |
A trio of strange knights try to save the Pocket Dragons from Betty Bye Belle. To protect the princess, the Pocket Dragons trick them into completing their quest.; The Wizard's chalice is broken somehow. Each of the Pocket Dragons move it around as they try to fix it, while Gnorman arrives trying to sell some merchandise.
| 16 | "King of the Hill / Disguise in Love with You" | 1998 |
When the Pocket Dragons use some rainbow-colored Roc eggshells, which the Wizard needed for a special spell, in a batch of rainbow cookies, they must journey to distant Mount Musgrave in search of a substitute, even rarer Gryphon egg shells. While the others argue about the best way up the mountain, Filbert sets off himself, accompanied by Gladstone the Gargoyle.; It is time again for the village's great masquerade ball, and once again, the villagers (knowing what disasters follow in their wake) have not invited the Pocket Dragons, who are not so easily thwarted, as they build themselves an elaborate space monster costume to let them sneak into the ball unrecognized.
| 17 | "Follow the Leader / Trashmandu" | 1998 |
After his friends insult his authority, Filbert leaves to capture the Grackul. After the Pocket Dragons rescue Filbert, they outwit and catch the Grackul.; The Pocket Dragons go all the way to Trashmandu to recover the Wizard's spellbook. The gnomes, however, won't easily part with it due to their local law.
| 18 | "Surely You Joust / Tree's a Crowd" | 1998 |
The Pocket Dragons assist Sir Kenneth in a knightly contest, but only succeed in making him look bad. That is, until he completes the final test.; When listening to Sir Nigel's heroic tales causes Filbert a crisis of confidence, Sir Nigel and the other Pocket Dragons decide to stage an opportunity for Filbert to prove his courage, by rescuing Scribbles from the fearsome Zazzixk. The plan, however, becomes more complicated than they had expected, when the real Zazzixk comes home from its vacation a little early, and is not too happy to discover that the Pocket Dragons are in its lair.
| 19 | "Mulch Ado About Nothing / Mission: Indigestible" | 1998 |
The Pocket Dragons apply some the Wizard's magic fertiliser on themselves and bloom plant-like appendages, which later makes them more closely resemble plants. Cuddles helps restore them to their normal states.; Walter returns for the Pocket Dragons' help to recover his lost jewel for his fianceé, but first, they have to extract it from the belly of a Kraken and the clutches of a shrimp.
| 20 | "A Dry Spell / Weather or Not" | 1998 |
The Wizard has an assignment to renew his wizard's license. The Pocket Dragons try to help without the Wizard knowing. They also discover that a magic clock is key to the village's dry spell.; Betty Bye Bell returns to her kingdom to investigate unusual weather. The Pocket Dragons discover that Carnuckle's magic ring is causing the weather changes and help the gremlin recover a magic book to undo the ring's effects.
| 21 | "Yonder Lies the Castle of My Wizard / Pillow Squawk" | 1998 |
The Pie-Rats arrive in an airship and steal the Wizard's castle. After much persistence, the Pocket Dragons convince them to give up their pirating ways.; Cuddles discovers that his pillow has disappeared. While the other Pocket Dragons tear the castle apart searching for the pillow, Cuddles tries a series of pillow substitutes, each one worse than the last.
| 22 | "First Pocket Dragons on the Moon / All's Faire" | 1998 |
The Pocket Dragons build a rocketship to travel to the Moon. They land on what they think is the Moon, until they meet the Wizard who comes to bring them home.; The Pocket Dragons visit the local country fair, where Zoom-Zoom spots the amusement park ride of his dreams, which is a catapult that flings its riders through the air. Zoom-Zoom, however, does not meet the minimum height requirement to ride the catapult, but he tries every trick in the book to sneak past the suspicious operator and get to the ride.
| 23 | "Hail, Hail, the Ghengis Here / Thief in the Night" | 1998 |
The Pocket Dragons try to prevent Genghis Khan from reaching the village. It turns out he has changed to running a delivery service and was giving Betty Bye Belle a package.; The Duke of Cummerbund and his servant Weevil claim the Wizard's castle as their own by the Right of Nocturnal Seizure. That is, until the Pocket Dragons drive them away before dawn.
| 24 | "Something Wicker This Way Comes / There's No Place Like Gnome" | 1998 |
In the mysterious forest, Binky befriends the Bramble. The other Pocket Dragons think she is in danger, until Binky introduces them to him.; During the Blue Moon Festival, the village vanishes, with the Pocket Dragons thinking it is their fault. What is more, Gnorman comes to claim the empty land his own.
| 25 | "Winter Take All / The Big Nap" | 1998 |
The Pocket Dragons accidentally summon a frost giant named Slush who makes the castle his icy home. The Pocket Dragons convince him to leave by ventilating heat around the place.; A pixie is seeking his brother, Sid, who has been turned into a music box. The Pocket Dragons help the pixie recover Sid and the Wizard restores him to his true form.
| 26 | "The Trouble with Scribbles / Attack of the 50 Foot Binky" | 1998 |
In attempts to put things right, Scribbles puts her inventions to the test, but an animation causes a chain of disasters.; Binky concocts a potion that makes her uncontrollably bigger. The Pocket Dragons go to the Mysterious Land to find the cure, but run into the Grackul.
| 27 | "Snow Binky and the Six Pocket Dragons / Reservoir Clogs" | 1998 |
The Pocket Dragons and Sparkles do their own play based on the classic fairy tale Snow White, with many plot twists and chaos on stage.; The Pocket Dragons help a village of cobalts to secure their water source by relocating the sleeping grendel. They discover the grendel also has a need for water.
| 28 | "Brother, Can You Spare a Dragon? / The Frill of a Lifetime" | 1998 |
Sir Kenneth borrows Sparkles to get a promotion and vacation from King Biggity. Sparkles proves to be more of a handful for the king than he thought.; Nigel reluctantly brings his clumsy brother, Chumley, on an adventure to Malicant Cave. Aided by the Pocket Dragons, the adventure is a success.
| 29 | "A Babe in the Woods / A Really Bad Hair Day" | 1998 |
The Pocket Dragons babysit the dragon Evangelina's son, Meldrick, but Meldrick's antics lead them to a wild chase looking for him.; A freak spell separates the beard from the wizard into a living furball. The Pocket Dragons chase it until they find it was stolen by another wizard.
| 30 | "Sleepwalk on the Wild Side / To Hex or Not to Hex" | 1998 |
Cuddles takes on different personalities after being doused in a potion. The Pocket Dragons pursue Cuddles to catch him before he gets himself in danger.; While visiting Sir Nigel, the Pocket Dragons open a mysterious box that Sir Nigel picked up on his travels, but Nigel tells them that the box is cursed, and now the Pocket Dragons are cursed as well. The Pocket Dragons head back to the castle to find a cure with disastrous results, and even though the Pocket Dragons are the "hexed" ones, the brunt of each catastrophe falls on Sir Nigel.
| 31 | "Binky, Warrior Princess / Rose-Colored Specs" | 1998 |
A dragon named Trafalgar attacks the village. The Pocket Dragons leave Binky out due to her hurt wing, but proves them wrong after outwitting the evil dragon.; The Pocket Dragons accidentally break Specs' glasses. Zoom-Zoom repairs them with a spell that makes the wearer see everything his or her own way.
| 32 | "Now You See Me, Now You Don't / Mortal Wombat" | 1998 |
Scribbles is overjoyed when she buys an invisibility cloak from a traveling salesman. It does not work, but the other Pocket Dragons – remembering the mischief Scribbles got up to the last time she went missing – decide to have a little fun with her by pretending she really is invisible.; The Wombat Master arrives and warns the Pocket Dragons about incoming evil warriors emerging from a portal in the castle. The Wombat Master, however, is less than he appears to be.
| 33 | "Monster Mashed / Here There Be Dragons" | 1998 |
Cuddles becomes scared of the holiday called Darkling Night, a time of year when all the spooks, goblins, and other creatures appear, making eerie sounds in the night.; The Pocket Dragons go on an adventure with Sparkles out to sea. On a ship, Captain Milo Meander captures Sparkles, but Sparkles saves the ship and the crew from a whirlpool.
| 34 | "The Echoing Dwarf / Binky and the Beanstalk" | 1998 |
The Pocket Dragons explore the Echo Valley to recover the town crier's echo. Resinence the Echo Dwarf causes trouble in the village, but the Pocket Dragons make an agreement with him.; After days of no rain, Binky grows a beanstalk that reaches into the sky. From there, the pocket dragons prompt the Main Cloud and Cirrus to make rain.
| 35 | "Fled a Good Book Lately? / A Knight to Remember" | 1998 |
Specs accidentally casts a spell that sends all the Pocket Dragons inside a storybook, where they thwart an evil vizier from overthrowing the palace sheik.; While a young girl named Lady Honeycomb, the granddaughter of one of the Wizard's old friends, is visiting the castle for a few days, she sees Cuddles in his sleep-walking hero persona, Sir Cuddles. She is so impressed that she wants him to teach her how to be a valiant knight, too, inspiring the Pocket Dragons to devise an elaborate program to train Sir Cuddles' new squire in knightly gallantry.
| 36 | "Altitude Adjustment / The Unbearable Lightness of Zoom-Zoom" | 1998 |
Sparkles' berry allergy causes him to sneeze, making Zoom-Zoom and anything else afflicted fly up into the air. Only water can wash off the anti-gravity effects.; Witch Mabity, who has problems with her magic, casts a spell that makes Zoom-Zoom fly out of control. Together, Mabity and the Wizard reverse the effects of the spell.
| 37 | "Jester Round the Bend / Dumb Diddy Do" | 1998 |
Binky and Scribbles find the Wizard's old jester doll and accidentally bring it to life. With difficulty, the Pocket Dragons get the spell to turn it back into a doll.; While sleep playing, Sir Cuddles rescues a wandering minstrel from a hungry plant, and soon, the minstrel is heard singing of Sir Cuddles' gallantry in the village. Now, the other Pocket Dragons want the minstrel to write songs about them, too.
| 38 | "Nothing But the Roof / Clanks a Million!" | 1998 |
The Pocket Dragons try to fix a leaky roof. Additional problems occur around the castle as the Pocket Dragons make several mistakes.; Filbert gets trapped in a magic suit of armor, which starts acting out of control. At Binky's suggestion, Zoom-Zoom finds an instructions manual to shut down the armor.
| 39 | "Trap Happy / Opposites Distract" | 1998 |
The Pocket Dragons fortify the castle against the wily Monsieur Packrat. The burglar evades every trap except Zoom-Zoom's until he is forced to surrender.; Specs and Zoom-Zoom compete for Princess Betty's affection, after a mishap with a love spell. Scribbles manages to undo the spell before things get out of hand.
| 40 | "All That Glitters / Clockwork Berserk" | 1998 |
Hoping to get some gold to fund the library, Pocket Dragons find a pot of gold, but the Leprechaun Riggadoodle won't let them have it easily.; Tinker, the evil inventor, captures the Pocket Dragons and the Library Cat and plans to destroy the wizard's castle with an alarm clock.
| 41 | "Bewitched, Bothered and Bedragoned / The Ransom of Sparkles" | 1998 |
Witch Mildred moves in and tries to trick the Pocket Dragons to becoming her familiars for her evildoing. The Pocket Dragons cause her a great deal of trouble, for the better.; Three outlaws kidnap Sparkles and hold him for ransom, but he proves to be too much for them to handle, even after he rescues them.
| 42 | "Sharp Dressed Gnome / Dragon Snaps" | 1998 |
Gnorman finds one of the wizard's robes and plays with the magic items inside, forcing the Pocket Dragons to solve the problems left in the process.; Hoping to make up to the villagers, the Pocket Dragons mass produce cookies for them. While looking for Cuddles, they cause chaos with the cookie machine.
| 43 | "Slice of Ice / Another Fine Hex" | 1998 |
The Pocket Dragons anger Shmahz, who chases them through the snow until he gets frozen solid.; The Pocket Dragons unleash a curse from Nigel's box. Their attempts to remove the curse cause Nigel a lot of problems.

== Production ==
=== Development ===
Development of the series started after Kaaren Lee Brown, Bohbot Entertainment's general manager, went to a party and oversaw a set of Pocket Dragons figures, finding out that Craig Miller and franchise creator Real Musgrave were negotiating to adapt the figures into an animated TV series. In October 1995, Bohbot bought the television rights from Miller and Musgrave and signed D'Ocon Films Productions as a European co-producer in April 1996.

The series was officially announced in July 1996 and was pre-sold at MIPCOM that year in some territories. In February 1997, D'Ocon was confirmed to handle a majority of the series' production, as well as holding rights in Spain and Portugal, while Bohbot would control all other territories. The series was the first to be supplied under a new deal with the Writers Guild of America (WGA). DIC Entertainment was brought to animate most of the episodes, and the series premiered in the Fall of 1998 on the Bohbot Kids Network strand.

=== Series overview ===
Each half-hour episode contained two 11-minute segments. The episodes contained some educational elements, but were mostly written for entertainment. The plots usually involved the Pocket Dragons getting into some kind of mess, either due to their own actions or those of others, and going through wild and crazy situations while trying to set things right.

Some of the episodes' plots and titles are parodies of films or TV series, such as the episodes "Binky, Warrior Princess", and "Attack of the 50 Foot Binky".

104 eleven-minute episodes were produced. They aired as 52 half-hour episodes in the United States, with some countries airing them as 15-minute programs (in the United Kingdom, for example, the series ran seven days a week on BBC1 and BBC2 for six years as part of its children's programming strand CBBC).

== Release ==
Pocket Dragon Adventures has been released on DVD in the United States and around the world (including the United Kingdom, France and other European countries) but availability is limited. DVDs contain selected episodes only. The entire series is currently available on the free streaming platforms Tubi, Pluto TV, and Peacock.
