= The Doctor Is Out =

The Doctor Is Out may refer to:

== Television ==
- "The Doctor Is Out" (The A-Team), a 1985 episode
- "The Doctor Is Out", a 1998 episode of The Spooktacular New Adventures of Casper
- "The Doctor Is Out" (Frasier), a 2003 episode
- "The Doctor Is Out", a 2003 episode of It's All Relative
- The Doctor Is Out ... Really Out, a 2005 installment in the McBride film series

== Other uses ==
- Getting Away with Murder (play), a Sondheim–Furth collaboration first staged as The Doctor Is Out in 1995
- "The Doctor Is Out", an autobiographical essay in the 2005 book Lolly Scramble by Tony Martin

== See also ==
- The Doctor Is In (disambiguation)
