= Craig Miller (writer) =

American writer and film producer

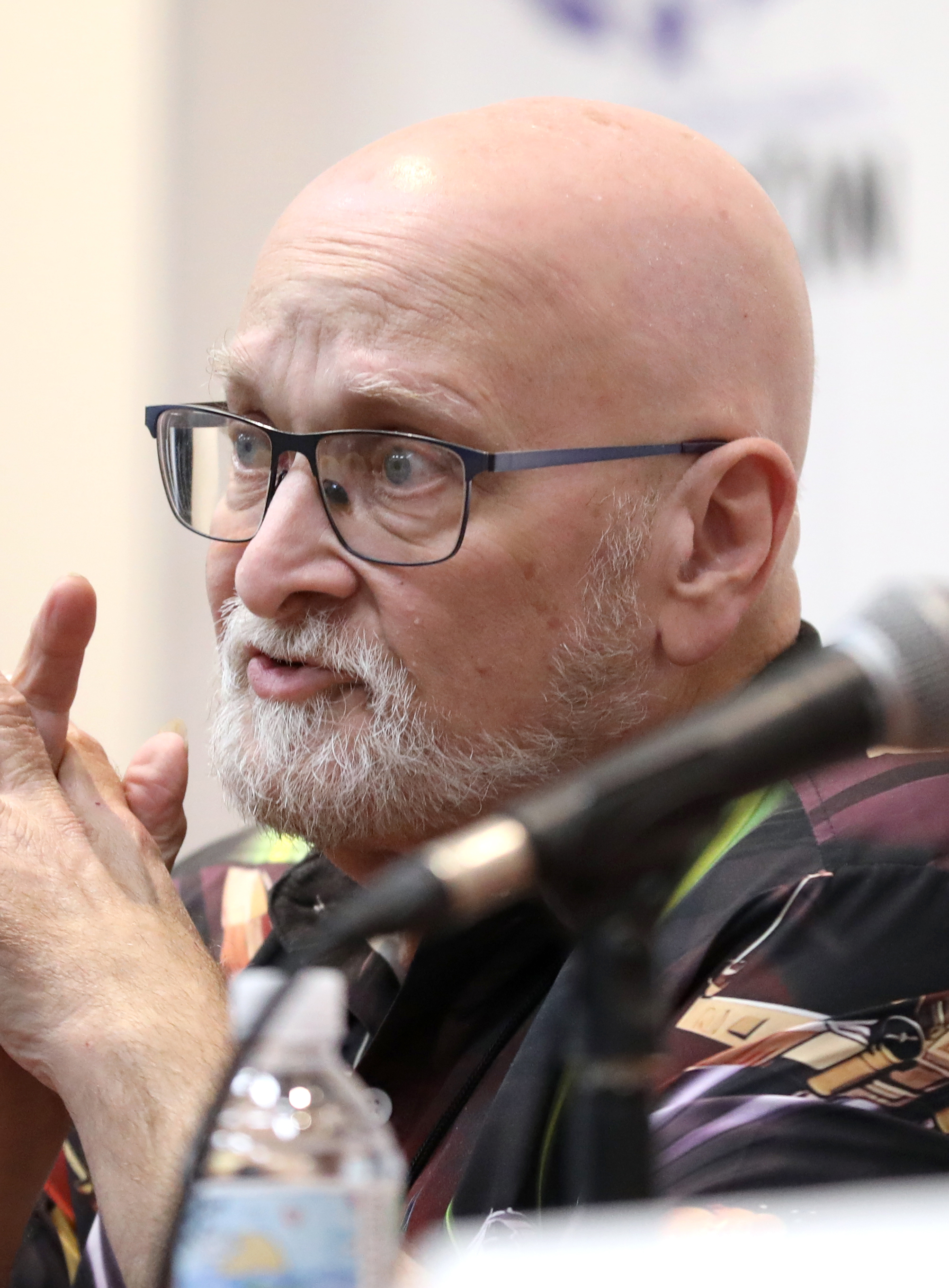
- Miller at the 2024 WonderCon
- Born: Craig Franklin Miller; Los Angeles, California, US
- Education: Child Development, Social Psychology
- Alma mater: Santa Monica College, University of California, Los Angeles
- Occupation: Writer/producer
- Spouse: Genevieve "Genny" Dazzo
- Writing career
- Language: English
- Genres: Animation, Science Fiction
- Notable work: Pocket Dragon Adventures

Craig Miller is an American writer/producer with over 200 film and television credits. He works in live-action, animation, and character designs.

== Career ==
Miller worked as a consultant on publicity, marketing, and licensing for Lucasfilm, Warner Bros., Universal, Disney, Columbia, Henson Associates, and others. His work included the films Star Wars, The Empire Strikes Back, Excalibur, Superman II, Altered States, The Dark Crystal, The Wicker Man, The Muppets Take Manhattan, and many more.

Miller has been quoted in Entertainment Weekly Magazine about early market research for Star Wars. His work for Lucasfilm at that time included creating fan "buzz" for the series in the absence of social media.

His background in animation includes The Smurfs, Beast Wars and The Real Ghostbusters. His 104 episode TV series Pocket Dragon Adventures was a finalist for the Humanitas Prize. Miller served as writer for 3 years on PBS' Emmy-winning animated series Curious George. For CCTV, the official Chinese television network, he co-developed and wrote episodes of the animated series Flute Master.

Miller is a regular speaker on writing for both animation and games. He has been featured at the Annecy Animation Festival in France. He spoke at the Cartoons on the Bay event in Italy in 2004. and was a panelist at San Diego Comic-Con. He also spoke at the International Conference on Television Animation in Italy, and the Interactive Entertainment Festival in Scotland, as well as the National Association of Television Program Executives (NATPE), KidScreen Summit, the Writers Guild of America, the World Animation Celebration, Anime L.A., Animation Expo, and the World Science Fiction Convention.

He is a member of the Writers Guild of America (for which he chairs the Animation Writers Caucus), the Writers Guild of Canada, and the Academy of Television Arts and Sciences (where he has been an Emmy Judge for several years). He serves on the Steering Committee for Women In Animation - Los Angeles and has been a judge for the Annie Awards.

== Television credits ==
- Bionic Six (1987)
- Dinosaucers (1987)
- The Real Ghostbusters (1987)
- The Smurfs (1988-1989)
- G.I. Joe: A Real American Hero (1990)
- Mighty Max (1994)
- Phantom 2040 (1995)
- Beast Wars: Transformers (1996)
- Flash Gordon (1996)
- The Hunger (1997)
- Pocket Dragon Adventures (1998)
- Godzilla: The Series (1998)
- Stargate Infinity (2003)
- Trollz (2005)
- Curious George (2006-2009)
