= Merrilyn Gann =

Canadian actress

- Born: 1948 (age 77–78); Vancouver, British Columbia
- Occupation: Actor
- Years active: 1975–present
- Known for: Everwood
- Spouse: Christopher Gaze (divorced)

Merrilyn Gann (born 1948) is a stage, film and television actress from Canada. On stage, she founded a theatre company in Edmonton and has performed many times at the Shaw Festival in Niagara-on-the-lake and Bard on the Beach in Vancouver. On television, she played Rose, wife of Dr. Abbott and the town's mayor in all four seasons of The WB's Everwood.

== Personal life ==
Gann was born in 1948 in Vancouver, British Columbia. (Note: Recent sources often report her birthdate as 3 January 1963, but this is inconsistent with her pageant activity. She turned 19 in 1967, after her Miss Vancouver victory in August, and before the Miss Canada competition in November.) She has an older sister, Angela.

In 1967 Gann won Miss Vancouver and was runner-up for Miss Canada.

She was married for some time to Christopher Gaze, whom she met in 1978 at Northern Light while performing lunchtime theatre.

== Career ==
She has appeared in numerous stage and television productions. She and her sister (also an actor) were founding members of Edmonton, Alberta's Northern Light Theatre in 1975.

She and Gaze often appeared on stage together. In 1981, they played in an outdoor staging of Shaw's Saint Joan in Edmonton. The Edmonton Journal called her portrayal of Joan of Arc "a marvel", praising her warmth, enthusiasm and confidence. At the 1987 Shaw Festival, they appeared in a pair of one act plays. A critic from The Province praised them jointly for Village Wooing, saying they "infused the piece with genuine affection". She's also a veteran of Vancouver's annual Bard on the Beach Shakespeare festival.

In the 1990 television adaptation of Stephen King's novel It, she played a small guest role as the mother of a murdered girl. In Roland Emmerich's 2009 disaster film 2012, she played the German Chancellor.

Her best known role was on the WB television drama Everwood, where she played Rose Abbott, alongside Tom Amandes as her husband and Emily VanCamp and Chris Pratt as their children. Her character was also the mayor of the fictional town. The show ran for four seasons from 2002–2006.

== Selected filmography ==
=== Film ===
- 1977: Why Shoot the Teacher?
- 1987: Roxanne
- 2009: 2012

=== Television ===
- 2002–2006: Everwood (68 episodes)
- 2007: Supernatural
- 2010: Smallville
- 2011: The Killing
- 2015: Mistresses
