= Pocket Dragons =

Collectible figurine series

Pocket Dragons are collectible depictions of friendly dragons in various situations. They were produced primarily in figurine form, but were also produced as ornaments, in flat artwork and various other forms. They were created and designed by Real Musgrave and the figurines were manufactured by Collectible World Studios.

Unlike many artists behind collectible lines, Musgrave not only created the flat artwork for them, but also sculpted them. Both Real and his wife, Muff, enjoyed nearly complete creative control over the line.

== History ==
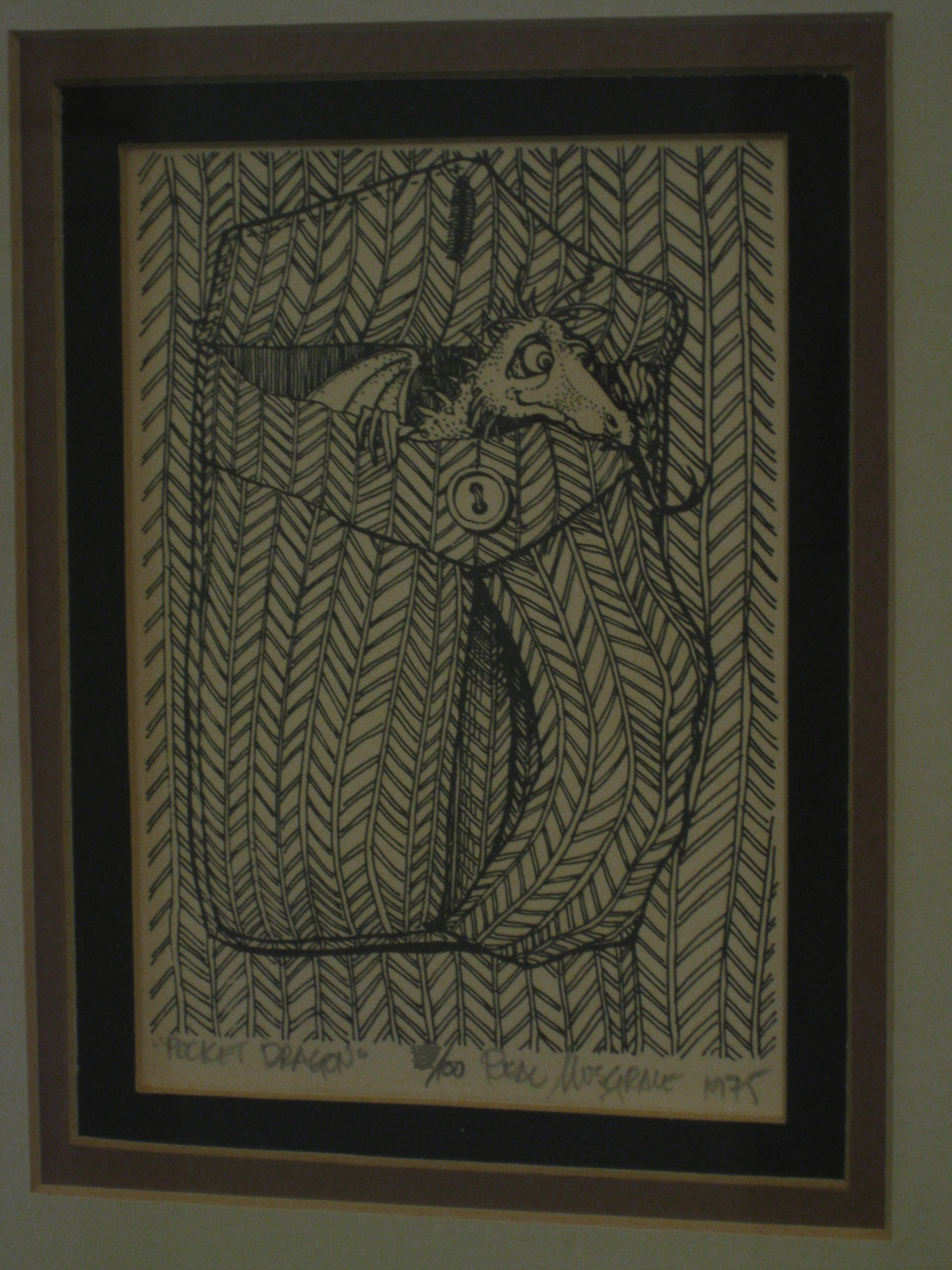

The story of the Pocket Dragons line dates back to a limited set of black and white drawings illustrated by Real Musgrave in the mid-1970s, depicting a small dragon in the pocket of a tweed sport jacket. These dragons were originally based on Real and Muff's dog, Flower.

The first set of Pocket Dragon figurines went on sale in June 1989, and included twenty-seven figures. They were produced in Stoke-on-Trent in the United Kingdom.

In 1997, an animated series was produced based on the figures, called Pocket Dragon Adventures, which was produced and distributed by BKN International. It ran for fifty-two half hour episodes (or 104 15-minute episodes in Europe) in early 1998. The writers of the series collaborated with both Musgraves, and Real contributed designs for virtually every episode. A computer game based on the TV series titled Pocket Dragon Adventures — The Wizard's Apprentices was developed.

As of 2006, over 400 different Pocket Dragons figures had been released, as well as games, books and hundreds of other products.

Real and Muff Musgrave retired in 2006, along with the production of Pocket Dragon figurine collection.

In May 2006, distributor Collectible World Studios went into receivership due to high debts and ceased trading. The production and distribution of what would be the last Pocket Dragon figures was uncertain. Since then, the official website and the website of the distributor are no longer online. Xystos, a company linked with Collectables (Fine Glass and China) Ltd. bought CWS later that same year.

The last UK Pocket Dragons event was held at Collectables (Fine Glass and China) Ltd. in Stockton-on-Tees in November 2006. Real and Muff Musgrave had retired by this point and were attending to abandoned animals, but Real still produced Pocket Dragon products licensed with other companies. Proceeds from the sales were donated to animal charities with which the Musgraves worked. In 2011, they continued their collaborations with Precious Gifts in Maryland to produce a special limited edition figurine to benefit Humane Tomorrow (in Texas).

Unlike many artists involved in collectibles and television, Real Musgrave has always personally owned the trademarks and copyrights for his work. The Pocket Dragon trademarks and copyrights are active.
