= All Roads Lead Home =

- Directed by: Dennis Fallon
- Written by: Doug Delaney
- Starring: Vivien Cardone; Peter Coyote; Jason London; Vanessa Branch; Garrett Smith; Patton Oswalt; Stephen Milton; Peter Boyle; Joicie Appell
- Music by: Korey Ireland
- Production company: Waldo West Productions
- Distributed by: Anchor Bay Entertainment
- Release date: January 2008 (Santa Barbara)
- Country: United States
- Language: English

All Roads Lead Home is a 2008 drama film directed by Dennis Fallon and starring Peter Boyle, Patton Oswalt, Jason London, Vivien Cardone, Vanessa Branch, Peter Coyote, Garrett Smith, Stephen Milton, and Allan Kayser. It was released on September 25, 2008.

It was filmed in and around Kansas City, Missouri. The film had a World Premiere on January 27, 2008, at the Santa Barbara International Film Festival.

Peter Boyle died before the movie's release. It was the last movie that he appeared in and was dedicated to his memory.

== Plot ==
A 12-year-old girl, Belle, is visited by her grandfather who lives on Banyon Farms. Her grandfather asks her to name a dog, after she named a horse Apache Wind. She names the dog Atticus, from Atticus Finch in To Kill a Mockingbird. Later, she loses her mother in a car accident, and she thinks her father cut her life support. After releasing all of the kennel dogs where her father works, she is punished by being sent to the farm, while her father stays at an inn owned by an old man named Poovey. When pets start to get sick and die in Belle's hometown, her father's veterinarian girlfriend struggles to find out what is killing the healthy animals. Disliking the work at Banyon Farms, Belle runs away with Apache Wind, Atticus, and two of Atticus' puppies from his litter of four, and almost dies while running away in the middle of a torrential downpour when she slips and falls on railroad tracks while a train approaches. Luckily, the farmhand, Basham, saves her. Belle's father and his girlfriend visit and Belle's father tells her that he actually argued with the doctors to keep her on life support, and succeeded. She is told that her mother lived for another 39 hours, and her father regrets that decision every day because he knows that she was in extreme pain. Atticus attacks Basham, and because Belle is now running the farm, she decides the dog should be put to death because that is what she learned on the farm. Meanwhile, her father runs out of money and Poovey tells him to repaint his inn to stay. When the dog is about to die, the vet discovers that the food Basham was carrying and the food the dogs ate contained a lethal grain-based mold (aflatoxin) that was killing the animals. The vet goes to the factory where the food was made and convinces them to recall, thereby ending the dog epidemic. At the end, Belle's rich grandfather has Poovey’s inn turned into a no-kill animal shelter.

== Cast ==
- Vivien Cardone as Belle
- April Bowlby as Natasha
- Evan Parke as Basham
- Peter Boyle as Poovey
- Patton Oswalt as Milo
- Bruce Heinrich as Satch

== Awards ==
- Winner of Best Feature Drama in the International Family Film Festival

== See also ==
- List of films about horses
