= List of Everwood episodes =

2002 American TV drama series episode list

Everwood is an American drama television series that aired on the WB from September 16, 2002, to June 5, 2006, with a total of 89 episodes produced, spanning four seasons. Most of the episodes were narrated by one character. The series' fourth and final season concluded with a two-hour finale.

== Series overview ==
Season	Episodes	Originally released	
Season	Episodes	First released	Last released
1	23	September 16, 2002	May 19, 2003
2	22	September 15, 2003	May 10, 2004
3	22	September 13, 2004	May 23, 2005
4	22	September 29, 2005	June 5, 2006

== Episodes ==
=== Season 1 (2002–03) ===
No. overall	No. in season	Title	Directed by	Written by	Original release date	Viewers (millions)
1	1	"Pilot"	Mark Piznarski	Greg Berlanti	September 16, 2002	7.43
2	2	"The Great Doctor Brown"	Kathy Bates	Greg Berlanti	September 23, 2002	5.54
3	3	"Friendly Fire"	Danny Leiner	Oliver Goldstick	September 30, 2002	6.11
4	4	"The Kissing Bridge"	Michael Schultz	Rina Mimoun	October 7, 2002	6.66
5	5	"Deer God"	Arlene Sanford	Michael Green	October 14, 2002	6.50
6	6	"The Doctor Is In"	Stephen Gyllenhaal	Vanessa Taylor	October 21, 2002	5.84
7	7	"We Hold These Truths"	Jason Moore	Joan Binder Weiss	October 28, 2002	6.31
8	8	"Till Death Do Us Part"	Michael Schultz	Oliver Goldstick	November 4, 2002	6.39
9	9	"Turf Wars"	Steve Gomer	Rina Mimoun	November 11, 2002	5.94
10	10	"Is There a Doctor in the House?"	Robert Duncan McNeill	Michael Green	November 18, 2002	6.14
11	11	"A Thanksgiving Tale"	David Petrarca	Vanessa Taylor	November 25, 2002	6.96
12	12	"Vegetative State"	Lev L. Spiro	John E. Pogue	January 6, 2003	5.44
13	13	"The Price of Fame"	Sandy Smolan	Rina Mimoun	January 20, 2003	6.67
14	14	"Colin the Second"	Mel Damski	Joan Binder Weiss	January 27, 2003	5.68
15	15	"Snow Job"	David Petrarca	Michael Green	February 3, 2003	6.37
16	16	"My Funny Valentine"	Michael Schultz	Vanessa Taylor	February 10, 2003	5.69
17	17	"Everwood Confidential"	Arlene Sanford	David Schulner	February 17, 2003	5.29
18	18	"The Unveiling"	Michael Schultz	Greg Berlanti & Rina Mimoun	February 24, 2003	5.99
19	19	"The Miracle of Everwood"	Arlene Sanford	Michael Green	April 21, 2003	4.62
20	20	"Moonlight Sonata"	Michael Schultz	Wendy Mericle & Patrick Sean Smith	April 28, 2003	4.49
21	21	"Episode 20"	David Petrarca	Greg Berlanti & Vanessa Taylor	May 5, 2003	5.05
22	22	"Fear Itself"	Michael Katleman	John E. Pogue	May 12, 2003	5.37
23	23	"Home"	Sandy Smolan	Story by : Greg Berlanti & Vanessa Taylor; Teleplay by : Michael Green & Rina Mimoun	May 19, 2003	5.55

=== Season 2 (2003–04) ===
No. overall	No. in season	Title	Directed by	Written by	Original release date	Viewers (millions)
24	1	"The Last of Summer"	Michael Schultz	Greg Berlanti & Rina Mimoun	September 15, 2003	5.93
The entire town blames Andy for "killing" Colin. They stop going to his practice and shun his children. Andy stands by his decision and eventually admits to Ephram that he could have saved Colin's life, but he would have been severely disabled, both mentally and physically, and at Colin's insistence, he had promised Colin that he would not let him live that way. Laynie returns from boarding school.
25	2	"Extra Ordinary"	David Petrarca	Michael Green	September 22, 2003	6.38
Andy badgers Ephram into taking on more hobbies to help get into a top college. A visiting music conservatory tutor assesses Ephram and tells him his sight reading is not, and will never be, good enough for him to be a concert pianist. He suggests Ephram concentrate on getting into college but not music conservatories. Amy's mourning seems to be slowly developing into depression. Amy's parents despair over her lack of interest in education. Her mother convinces her to talk to someone who could help. Bright is told that he cannot play sports in his final year because he has failed math, and this would prevent him from getting in on a sports scholarship. His coach suggests he claim special consideration because of Colin; his parents urge him to do this, but he resists, not wanting to use Colin's death to help him. Andy convinces Ephram to continue studying music and to follow his dream.
26	3	"My Brother's Keeper"	Michael Schultz	Vanessa Taylor	September 29, 2003	5.74
Dr. Abbott and his mother are irked when Harold's jet-setting sister Linda, also a doctor, returns and announces that she wants to settle down and join the practice. It raises issues for Dr Abbott and his mother: he explains that he was mad at her for choosing to leave them when they were children to go to war in Vietnam. Linda Abbott shocks her family when she reveals that she wants to stay in Everwood rather than travel again. Andy is faced with a case of a thirteen-year-old boy, who reveals that he and others formed a 'sex club.' The parents do not want to believe it. Amy begins to drink and goes to a college frat party. Ephram tells Bright, they pull her out of the party, and the friendship between Ephram and Bright grows. Nina Feeney (Andy's neighbour and friend) reveals to him that her husband left her 5 months ago because he was gay.
27	4	"East Meets West"	David Petrarca	John E. Pogue	October 6, 2003	5.69
Andy's well-meaning plan to give Ephram more time by hiring college student Madison to help with Delia, backfires when she treats Ephram like a child. He tries to get her fired, while Andy nearly fires her after she shouts at both him and Ephram for always fighting in front of Delia and not giving her enough attention. Delia stops Andy from firing her. Dr Abbott continues to fight with Linda as she introduces holistic medicine to their practice. She eventually persuades him to try acupuncture for his neck cramp; it works. Andy tries to help Mr. Hart, who is an alcoholic and has started drinking as a result of Colin's death. He thanks Andy but says he does not want to stop drinking. Amy is asked out by another of Bright's friends. Bright is not happy about it; he asks Ephram to ask her out instead. Nina falls out with Andy because he is not being supportive enough as she goes through divorce proceedings.
28	5	"Daddy's Little Girl"	Peter Lauer	Rina Mimoun & Joan Binder Weiss	October 13, 2003	5.29
Andy invites Linda Abbott over for dinner, but Delia considers her as a replacement for Julia, and swears at her father over dinner. Linda later falls out with Andy over a patient that he refers to her because she feels he does not genuinely believe in holistic therapy. Amy's therapist recommends antidepressants; her parents fight over this. Eventually Amy asks her father to prescribe them because she is desperate to feel better; he refuses her.
29	6	"Blind Faith"	Sandy Smolan	David Hudgins	October 20, 2003	5.14
Andy's friend, Reverend Tom Keyes, returns from a long holiday in the tropics and introduces his fiancee. Andy retests his eyesight but finds it is almost gone. Tom decides to move his wedding date forward to the weekend in the hope of being able to see his bride on their wedding day. He asks his congregation to pray for his sight to last to the weekend. Then Andy offers him a treatment that may get his sight to last a few days longer. It does not work. Andy is asked to officiate at the wedding. Amy goes to meet Ephram after his driving test but sees him kiss Madison and leaves. Madison gives him the brush off. Linda Abbott suggests to her brother that she will take Andy to the cinema; he panics and starts matchmaking for her, inviting men over.
30	7	"Three Miners from Everwood"	David Petrarca	Michael Green	November 3, 2003	5.35
Andy tells his patient, Ellie Beals, that her pregnancy test is negative; her husband tells her it is because she works down a coal mine. The next day there is a mine collapse; she and miners Will Cleveland and Daniel Sullivan are trapped underground. Andy, Dr Abbott, and Linda Abbott fight to keep them alive. There are flashbacks into these characters lives. Ephram visits Cleveland to offer to pay for scratching his car. Cleveland gets Ephram's help to obtain jazz recordings from eBay. The two of them develop a relationship over the piano. Sullivan is Dr Abbott's next door neighbor and is building a lighthouse in his back garden. In the mine, Andy has to drill into Sullivan's head to release pressure of a hematoma. He also stems the bleeding in Cleveland's arm, preventing them from having to amputate. Afterwards, Dr Abbott questions his sister as to why she lied about her blood type when he suggested her for a transfusion; she tells him that she suspects she may be a hepatitis carrier.
31	8	"Burden of Truth"	Michael Schultz	Vanessa Taylor	November 10, 2003	5.99
When mechanic Phil correctly diagnoses one of Dr Brown's patients with meningitis rather than the flu, the town believes he has special powers. This results in his being plagued with people looking for readings on their health. Andy suggests he make a false prediction so that he is left alone. Ephram falls out with Madison when he admits her band could be better. He agrees to jam with her to see if he can help. She is impressed with his suggestions but resists his advances. Amy grows more depressed. Dr. Harold Abbott agrees to allow his sister Linda to help. While teaching her meditation, Amy steals a prescription script from Linda and forges a prescription for antidepressants. When her father finds out, they fight, but he agrees to write a prescription for her. Linda and Andy seem to be growing closer together, but she, too, resists his advances. He tells her how he feels. While discussing it with her mother, Linda admits she has contracted HIV in Africa.
32	9	"Just Like in the Movies"	Matt Shakman	Rina Mimoun	November 17, 2003	6.32
Andy tries to help a patient with a speech impediment tell his best friend that he loves her. They are both movie fans. Andy continues his pursuit of Linda, sending her presents. She tells him that she is not attracted to him. Initially Harold is relieved, but when his wife Rose tells him that Linda obviously does like Andy, his curiosity leads him to discover she is HIV+. He then advises her to tell Andy and let him decide. She does. Delia invites Madison to her slumber party; Bright comes, also, to keep Ephram from chasing her. After Bright leaves, Madison tells Ephram that her feelings have changed, and they kiss. Amy meets Tommy Callahan at a party; he is a recovered drug addict who is on parole for trying to burn down his school.
33	10	"Unhappy Holidays"	Jason Moore	John E. Pouge	November 24, 2003	5.87
Mrs Abbott's parents come to stay for Thanksgiving. Amy invites Tommy for Thanksgiving dinner; her Mom agrees and is happy to see her happy. Bright tells his dad about Tommy's background. Harold quizzes Tommy about this over the dinner table, and Tommy leaves. Harold grounds Amy and removes all her privileges; she tells him she does not care. Andy finds out about Ephram and Madison and stops them from seeing each other. Madison leaves, and Andy and Ephram fight. Andy and Harold meet in the bar, swap stories, and go to a casino. Andy agrees Ephram can see Madison but tells him he is not happy about it. Andy meets Linda in the Christmas tree lot. They kiss, and Delia sees it. Amy runs away.
34	11	"Family Dynamics"	Michael Schultz	David Hudgins	January 19, 2004	5.48
When Andy's relationship with Delia is threatened after he breaks his promise not to date Linda, he decides to take his daughter on a special bonding trip to regain her trust. Andy is also surprised by Ephram's emotional reaction to the relationship with Linda. The Abbott family is still in turmoil when Amy decides to live with Edna and Irv, rather than playing by her parents' rules.
35	12	"Controlling Interest"	Lev L. Spiro	Michael Green	January 26, 2004	5.20
Dr. Brown tries to intervene when a bulimic high school champion wrestler puts his life in jeopardy for an important tournament. Bright is suspended from school after he fights with Amy's boyfriend Tommy. Linda suspects that Andy is reluctant to move their relationship to a more intimate level because of her HIV status. Finally, Ephram is convinced that college student Madison is embarrassed to be seen with him.
36	13	"Forget Me Not"	Michael Schultz	Wendy Mericle & Patrick Sean Smith	February 2, 2004	4.42
Caught up in her first fight with Tommy, Amy's reconciliation with her father goes awry when she forgets his birthday dinner. Madison lies to Ephram about liking a love song he wrote, which leads to a fight when she refuses to show the song to her band. Nina finally confronts Andy about neglecting their friendship to spend time with Linda.
37	14	"No Sure Thing"	Perry Lang	Joan Binder Weiss	February 9, 2004	6.07
Ephram gets the wrong idea when Madison tells him her roommate is going to be out of town, but the misunderstanding leads to an intimate moment for the couple. In other matters of the heart, Amy decides she is ready to have sex with Tommy, so she works up the courage to ask Dr. Brown to write her a prescription for birth control pills, and Andy makes the important decision to talk to Ephram and Delia about Linda spending the night at their house.
38	15	"The L Word"	Michael Schultz	John E. Pouge	February 16, 2004	5.22
Ephram is horrified and heartbroken after he impulsively tells Madison that he loves her and she does not reciprocate. Meanwhile, Linda naively agrees to watch Delia overnight so that Andy can accompany Ephram and his piano teacher, Will, to a jazz competition in Boulder, and Amy breaks up with Tommy after realizing she might not be able to trust him again.
39	16	"Unspoken Truths"	Michael Lange	Greg Berlanti & Rina Mimoun	February 23, 2004	4.93
Through Bright's acquaintance, Ada, Ephram gets a fake ID so he can get into a bar to see Madison's band. He gets in a bar fight, and Andy has to bail him out of jail. Nina leans on Andy for emotional support after she is served with divorce papers, but the genuine affection between the two raises a red flag for Linda. Tommy takes Amy to a party where she finds closure over the loss of Colin, but the evening takes a life-threatening turn.
40	17	"Unfinished Business"	Sandy Smolan	David Hudgins	April 5, 2004	4.21
Amy moves back home, but finds adjusting to her old life difficult, especially after her parents discover she is taking birth control pills and her former friends give her the major cold shoulder. Elsewhere in Everwood, Ephram thinks Madison is going to break up with him and Andy testifies on behalf of Nina as she and her recently out-of-the-closet ex-husband battle for sole custody of their son.
41	18	"Last Looks"	Arvin Brown	John E. Pouge	April 12, 2004	4.33
Against Andy's better judgment, ex-sweethearts Ephram and Madison decide it would be in Delia's best interest if Madison resumed her job as Delia's babysitter. Amy contemplates going off her anti-depressant medication after Linda suggests she might be ready. All the colleges that Bright applied to reject him.
42	19	"Sick"	David Paymer	Michael Green	April 19, 2004	5.01
Amy confides to Bright that she may have developed feelings for Ephram, but Bright begs her to have mercy on poor Ephram, who is still nursing a broken heart from his recent break-up with Madison. Meanwhile, when Linda's HIV status is accidentally revealed to her patients, Dr. Abbott faces a potential malpractice suit, and Andy is forced to come clean with Ephram, who does not take the news very well.
43	20	"Do or Die"	Michael Schultz	Vanessa Taylor	April 26, 2004	5.23
Ephram and Amy decide to go to prom together as friends, but Amy cannot get up the nerve to tell Ephram that she has feelings for him after they run into Madison and Amy realizes that he is still nursing a broken heart. Meanwhile, Linda decides it may be time to leave Everwood behind, and Andy's mentor, Dr. Donald Douglas, asks him to perform risky brain surgery on a patient who turns out to be Dr. Douglas himself.
44	21	"Your Future Awaits"	Marita Grabiak	Wendy Mericle & Patrick Sean Smith	May 3, 2004	5.70
When Amy accompanies Ephram to his Juilliard audition in Boulder, a romantic moment leads her to confess her newfound feelings for him. Meanwhile, Andy struggles to convince his mentor Dr. Douglas that he needs even riskier brain surgery than originally thought and that Andy is the man to do it; Dr. Abbott faces losing his medical practice after it appears no company will insure him; and Bright decides not to attend his graduation ceremony, much to the disappointment of his family.
45	22	"The Day Is Done"	David Petrarca	Greg Berlanti, Michael Green & Rina Mimoun	May 10, 2004	6.38
Ephram is on cloud nine after being accepted into Juilliard's summer program, but his emotions are sent into a tailspin when Amy shares her feelings for him and asks that he stay in Everwood for the summer. Meanwhile, Dr. Abbott's family thinks he is gone off the deep end when he decides to open a bagel shop in response to losing his malpractice insurance; he subsequently accepts Andy's offer to return to medicine as Andy's partner. Andy learns a shocking revelation about Madison.

=== Season 3 (2004–05) ===
No. overall	No. in season	Title	Directed by	Written by	Original release date	Viewers (millions)
46	1	"For Every Action..."	David Petrarca	Rina Mimoun	September 13, 2004	5.97
Ephram and Amy are reunited after a long summer spent apart while Ephram attended Juilliard's summer program in New York, but Amy's euphoria is quickly replaced with paranoia after she notices Ephram acting distant. Meanwhile, Andy is plagued by guilt over whether he made the right decision concerning Madison's pregnancy; and Dr. Abbott befriends the town's newest citizen, Jake Hartman, who turns out to be a doctor from California looking to open a new practice in Everwood.
47	2	"...There Is a Reaction"	Perry Lang	David Hudgins	September 20, 2004	5.57
At her father's suggestion, a heartbroken Amy is determined to make the most of her senior year in the wake of Ephram's return from New York, telling her that piano has to be his number one priority. Andy contemplates telling Ephram about Madison's pregnancy. Meanwhile, Rose naively agrees to help Bright find his true calling after she discovers that he has not enrolled for college classes and is in fact leading a life of total leisure; Dr. Jake Hartman creates a marketing blitz for his new practice that threatens to push Dr. Abbott over the edge; and Nina takes in her friend's teenage daughter, Hannah, and asks Ephram to take her under his wing.
48	3	"Staking Claim"	Michael Schultz	Bruce Miller	September 27, 2004	4.92
Ephram regrets promising Nina that he would watch over Hannah at school, especially when her constant presence interferes with his time alone with Amy. Amy befriends Hannah out of a sense of charity, but soon finds Hannah so refreshing that a real friendship develops. She tells Hannah that her best friend Laynie went back to boarding school. Andy tries to ignore the tension between Dr. Abbott and Edna, but his attitude forces Edna to quit and go to work for Dr. Hartman. Andy treats a 13-year-old patient whose mysterious injuries cause Andy to suspect the boy's mother of abuse.
49	4	"The Birds and the Batteries"	Michael Lange	John E. Pogue	October 4, 2004	5.05
Andy finds himself at a loss over what to do when Delia naively stumbles upon Nina's vibrator and starts asking questions. Meanwhile, Ephram attempts to write Amy a love letter to show her the extent of his feelings; Amy makes it her mission to make new best friend Hannah popular; and Harold and Rose question Bright's euphoria over being selected "employee of the month" and decide it is time for some parental intervention.
50	5	"Sacrifice"	Michael Schultz	Anna Fricke	October 11, 2004	5.05
Andy puts his foot in his mouth by picking a fight with Everwood's patron saint, Amanda Hayes, who, unknownst to Andy, has been caring for her profoundly disabled husband for the past five years. Jake surprises Nina by asking her out on a date. Ephram and Bright fall out and realize their friendship may have grown too far apart to salvage, and neurotic-as-ever Dr. Abbott struggles to come up with a medical invention after learning that Dr. Brown and Dr. Hartman have successful inventions of their own.
51	6	"Shoot the Moon"	Matt Shakman	Michael Green	October 25, 2004	5.64
Andy worries that Ephram is beginning to question himself and his chances of getting into Juilliard after he applies to Colorado A&M as a back-up plan. Similarly, Harold has concerns of his own when Amy informs him that she is not applying to the school they always dreamed of her attending, Princeton, because it would take her too far away from Ephram. Meanwhile, Andy jumps head first into helping Amanda and her disabled husband with a new therapy involving music, but it may be too much and too fast for Amanda; and Edna and Irv's marriage hits a rough patch after Irv loses his job, and they contemplate their future together.
52	7	"Best Laid Plans"	Jason Moore	Sherri Cooper	November 1, 2004	5.35
When Jake surreptitiously informs Andy that Ephram came to him for a STD test, Andy and Harold decide the best plan of action is to convince Ephram and Amy to hold off on sex. Of course, when Ephram realizes it is no coincidence that he and Amy both had a heart-to-heart with their fathers on the same day and informs her of his suspicions, Amy feels betrayed that Ephram did not tell her about the test beforehand.
53	8	"The Tipping Point"	Jordan Levin	Michael Green & David Hudgins	November 15, 2004	4.71
Struggling to select the music program for his Juilliard audition tape, Ephram seeks guidance from his music teacher and mentor, Will Cleveland, but faces losing one of the most important relationships in his life after he regretfully hurts Will's feelings. Meanwhile, Andy and Amanda experience a miraculous breakthrough in their music therapy with Amanda's husband, but Andy quickly begins to question whether their celebratory mood is premature; and Bright continues down his unfortunate path of apathy by getting fired from his job – for getting intimate with a waitress in the supply closet – and lying to his parents.
54	9	"The Reflex"	Michael Lange	Anna Fricke & Rina Mimoun	November 22, 2004	5.28
Ephram and Amy decide they are ready to take the next step in their relationship with romantic plans to meet at the Abbotts' lake house, but the enormity of the situation proves too much for the couple to handle. Meanwhile, Andy and Amanda play chaperones for Delia and Charlie's pizza date, but the evening turns out to be more of a date for the two adults, who realize their mutual attraction is wrong. Finally, Nina reevaluates her feelings for Jake after he comes to her rescue.
55	10	"Need to Know"	David Petrarca	Bruce Miller	November 29, 2004	5.09
Realizing that his feelings for Amanda are only growing stronger despite his best efforts to maintain a platonic friendship, Andy decides it is in both of their best interests if he refers her husband's case to Dr. Abbott. Upon hearing news that Madison's band is performing in town, Ephram seeks guidance from Bright, signaling a thaw in the boys' chilly relationship as of late. Finally, Amy's curiosity unearths Hannah's family secret.
56	11	"Complex Guilt"	Arvin Brown	John E. Pogue	January 17, 2005	4.03
Following Amanda's decision to send her husband to a world-renowned treatment facility, Andy is rushed to the hospital after he collapses in front of Dr. Abbott as a result of the stress and guilt he has been feeling over his infidelity with Amanda. Meanwhile, Amy continues to give Ephram the cold shoulder for lying about Madison, and Edna builds a writer's room for a depressed Irv, but it does not go over well, and they separate.
57	12	"Giving Up the Girl"	David Paymer	Sherri Cooper	January 24, 2005	4.40
When Jake's girlfriend from Los Angeles arrives in Everwood unexpectedly, Nina comes to his rescue with a shoulder to lean on and the possibility of more. Meanwhile, Harold and Rose worry about Amy after she sets her mind to auditioning for a rigorous ballet program in Denver, and Andy unintentionally humiliates Delia in front of her hockey team.
58	13	"The Perfect Day"	Sandy Smolan	David Hudgins	January 31, 2005	4.25
Andy must face the repercussions of his affair with Amanda when Nina accidentally discovers them together and questions Andy's character. Meanwhile, Ephram and Amy convince a reluctant Hannah to ditch school for the day and take Bright along for the ride. Harold and Edna are forced to push their hostile feelings for one another aside when a medical emergency leaves them with no other choice.
59	14	"Since You've Been Gone"	Matt Shakman	Barbie Kligman	February 7, 2005	4.70
Andy and Amanda decide that it is time to tell Delia and Charlie about their relationship before they hear about it elsewhere, but Charlie's emotional reaction makes them question what they are doing. Meanwhile, when Hannah does not jump at the opportunity to go on a date with a really cute guy from school, Amy is convinced that Hannah is misguidedly saving herself for Bright, and Nina questions whether Sam is going to be hurt again if her relationship with Jake does not work out.
60	15	"Surprise"	Tom Amandes	Sherri Cooper	February 14, 2005	4.28
Just as they have become somewhat comfortable with their new relationship, Andy and Amanda receive word that Amanda's husband, John, has experienced a miraculous breakthrough in his recovery. Meanwhile, Amy learns the truth about why Madison really left town, an elated Ephram is offered an audition at Juilliard, Hannah questions whether she is emotionally prepared to take the test for Huntington's Disease, and Bright is accused of sexual misconduct in the workplace.
61	16	"A Mountain Town"	Michael Schultz	Michael Green	February 21, 2005	5.20
Feeling conflicted over the recent turn of events and not willing to jeopardize Ephram's Juilliard audition, an angst-filled Amy tells Ephram that he should take Andy to New York instead of her. In New York, Andy struggles with memories of his former life and the desire to tell Ephram the truth about Madison. Fate plays a hand when Ephram runs into Madison in Manhattan and they make plans to see each other, causing Andy to take matters into his own hands.
62	17	"Fate Accomplis"	Perry Lang	Anna Fricke	April 18, 2005	4.42
The day before his Juilliard audition in New York, Ephram makes plans to meet up with Madison for coffee, only to have his entire world come crashing down around him when she tells him that she was pregnant with their child. This devastating revelation causes Ephram to make decisions that will alter the course of his life. Meanwhile, back in Everwood, Amy cannot make heads or tails of what will happen to her relationship with Ephram once he learns the truth about Madison, and Dr. Abbott counsels a man whose son may die as a result of a hunting accident. Bright tells his father that he decided to get his own apartment and enroll at Everwood Community College.
63	18	"Fallout"	Michael Schultz	David Hudgins	April 25, 2005	4.39
After returning from New York feeling lost and confused and needing Amy for support, Ephram considers his options in the wake of Madison's life-altering revelation. Meanwhile, Andy is a little stunned upon learning the extent of Nina's feelings for Jake and, with a little encouragement from her friend, Bright, Hannah decides to go on a date with a smitten Topher.
64	19	"Acceptance"	David Petrarca	John E. Pogue	May 2, 2005	4.21
When Jake's little brother comes to visit and confides he does not see a future for Jake and Nina, Jake seeks counsel from an unlikely source... Andy. Meanwhile, Amy is accepted into Princeton, but assumes her father was the one who secretly sent in her application, and Ephram and Amy make plans to spend an evening together, further confusing the status of their relationship.
65	20	"He Who Hesitates"	Keith Samples	Elisa Delson	May 9, 2005	4.44
Ephram makes a bold move – and breaks his father's heart in the process – in an attempt to raise money for a plane ticket to Europe. Meanwhile, Nina cannot put her finger on why Andy has been acting strangely of late, whereas a more perceptive Delia comes right out and asks her father whether he has feelings for Nina, and Bright's green-eyed monster makes an unexpected appearance when Hannah goes to prom with Topher.
66	21	"Oh, The Places You'll Go"	Perry Lang	Story by : Bruce Miller; Teleplay by : David Hudgins & Rina Mimoun	May 16, 2005	4.42
Feeling there is nothing keeping him in Everwood and desperately needing distance from Andy, Ephram prepares to leave family and friends behind for a new life in Europe. However, he is caught off-guard and questions his plans when Andy reveals the secret that Amy has been keeping from Ephram. Meanwhile, Nina and Jake contemplate going into business together, but the stress on their relationship proves a big obstacle to overcome, and Bright confesses to Ephram that he has developed feelings for Hannah.
67	22	"Where the Heart Is"	David Petrarca	Michael Green & Rina Mimoun	May 23, 2005	4.77
With Ephram gone and no longer feeling any significant ties to Everwood, Andy consults with Delia and contemplates accepting a prestigious position with a Chicago hospital. Uncharacteristically upset over this bit of news, Harold takes it upon himself to give Andy a reason to stay. Meanwhile, Jake moves in with Nina, causing Andy to question whether he should rock the boat by telling her how he really feels, and Bright finally admits his feelings to Hannah.

=== Season 4 (2005–06) ===
No. overall	No. in season	Title	Directed by	Written by	Original release date	Viewers (millions)
68	1	"A Kiss to Build a Dream On"	Arvin Brown	Rina Mimoun	September 29, 2005	3.51
At the end of last season, Andy left Nina speechless by finally declaring his love for her, and Ephram decided to make a clean break from his troubles in Everwood by moving to Europe. In the season premiere, Nina will choose between the two men she loves – Andy and Jake. At Delia's behest, Ephram makes an emotional return to Everwood just in time for an unexpected wedding. Bright and Hannah are reunited after their first kiss and a summer spent apart. Amy meets medical student Reid Bardem, who is looking for an apartment; Amy suggests that he room with Bright. Amy and Rose find that Rose's cancer has driven them apart rather than brought them together.
69	2	"The Next Step"	Perry Lang	Anna Fricke	October 6, 2005	4.03
Andy learns that Ephram has no intention of moving back home; he and Ephram begin to heal their contentious relationship. Bright invites Ephram to move in with him and Reid. Hannah begins to worry about the long term possibilities for her relationship with Bright after he shares his "three dates and out" policy; Harold suspects Andy is up to something after he frequently goes missing from the office; Nina and Jake have the grand opening for their new restaurant; and Ephram and Amy finally confront the unspoken fate of their relationship.
70	3	"Put on a Happy Face"	David Paymer	Tom Garrigus	October 13, 2005	4.14
As if adjusting to college life at Colorado A&M and the news that her secret crush, Reid, is gay were not enough to handle, Amy learns that Ephram is going to be a regular fixture in her life now that he is moved in with Bright and Reid. Meanwhile, Andy, Nina and Jake attempt to move on with life after Nina decides which man she loves. Bright and Ephram, who are now students at Everwood Community College, take Hannah to a college party.
71	4	"Pieces of Me"	Mike Pavone	Josh Reims	October 20, 2005	4.07
Ephram begins giving piano lessons to a 14-year-old piano prodigy, Kyle, but Ephram soon realizes that the music awakens difficult memories from last year. Meanwhile, Dr. Brown advises a brain tumor patient and his wife; Harold and Rose await the latest cancer test results while dealing with the stress of a mayoral reelection; and Delia informs her father she wants a Bat Mitzvah.
72	5	"Connect Four"	Tom Amandes	David Hudgins	October 27, 2005	3.91
On a camping trip with Andy, Harold, and Bright, Ephram reveals the true reason he returned to Everwood, and Bright contemplates a sex-free relationship with Hannah after she tells him that she does not believe in premarital sex. Meanwhile, Amy grows even more emotionally confused when Reid asks her to go with him to a Halloween fund-raiser. Jake and Edna's working relationship is put to the test when Edna questions his work ethic. Ephram learns more about his mysterious piano student, Kyle.
73	6	"Free Fall"	Arvin Brown	Nancy Won	November 3, 2005	3.59
In hopes of mending Andy and Jake's friendship, Nina suggests the two men go to counseling together. Meanwhile, Andy breaks the news to Ephram that Amy may be seeing someone new; Harold helps Rose find new direction after losing the mayoral reelection campaign. Kyle is now 15, and Ephram realizes that Kyle's life may be more complicated than he originally thought.
74	7	"Pro Choice"	David Paymer	Barbie Kligman	November 10, 2005	3.68
Hannah's mother pays an unexpected visit to Everwood to tell Hannah that her father has died. Ephram stifles his feelings for Amy while forced to watch her relationship with Reid grow more serious; eventually, Ephram tells Reid to stop seeing Amy, and Reid complies. Andy advises a patient who desperately needs a kidney transplant but refuses to accept one from his daughter. Bright is at a loss at how best to help Hannah through her difficult time. Andy tells Ephram that he can't forgive himself for withholding Madison's pregnancy, and Ephram replies, "I forgave you a long time ago."
75	8	"So Long, Farewell..."	Joyce Chopra	Josh Reims	November 17, 2005	4.22
Changes are happening as Hannah gets ready to leave for Minnesota with her mother; Bright and Amy have to deal with the loss of his girlfriend and her best friend. Amy also has to deal with the lack of contact from Reid as he follows through on his promise to end his relationship with Amy. The adult males go through a risky time as they take on unsafe adventures. It starts with Jake and his friend Cliff going out on a bike trip that turns dangerous. Then Andy and Harold decide to seize the day and go skydiving.
76	9	"Getting to Know You"	Joe Pennella	Tom Garrigus	December 8, 2005	3.91
A very-much-in-love Ephram discovers that he has become a "girlfriend" to Amy, but the friendship is threatened when a moment of intimacy leads to them waking up together the next morning. Meanwhile, Nina grows suspicious of Jake's recent strange behavior, which is furthered when his brother shows up unexpectedly; Andy is worried when Delia takes up with the popular girls in school; Bright tackles Hannah's low self-esteem issues; and Rose drops some startling news on Harold.
77	10	"Ghosts"	Ellen S. Pressman	David Hudgins	March 27, 2006	3.58
With a week having passed since they slept together, Ephram and Amy must figure out what this new development means for their future, and Nina and Jake face the biggest obstacle of their relationship yet. Meanwhile, Irv's brutally honest description of Andy in his debut novel causes Andy to take a long look in the mirror, and Ephram realizes that he and Kyle may have even more in common than he originally thought.
78	11	"Lost and Found"	Perry Lang	Nancy Won	March 27, 2006	3.52
Amy's new college professor encourages her to get involved with the Planned Parenthood clinic. When Amy tries to get Hannah to volunteer as well, it leads to a serious rift between the friends. Harold and Rose consider adopting a child from Africa. While Irv is on his book tour, Edna winds up in the hospital, and Andy comes to the rescue. Ephram's sadness over his relationship with Amy and his sudden lack of direction in life is made worse by the news that his piano teacher, Will Cleveland, has died.
79	12	"You're a Good Man, Andy Brown"	Arvin Brown	Anna Fricke	April 3, 2006	3.77
Although Jake is back from rehab and going to 12-step meetings every night, Nina realizes she has no idea how to deal with his recovery. Andy cancels his first Internet date to give Nina emotional support. Amy tries to impress Professor Fields by enlisting her father's help at the clinic, which results in Dr. Abbott's lying to his daughter about his past. Ephram encourages Kyle to meet with his long-absent father, opening old wounds for Ephram regarding his own son. When Delia asks Andy to listen to the rough draft of her Bat Mitzvah speech, he is deeply touched by her memories and her message.
80	13	"An Ounce of Prevention"	Perry Lang	Bryan M. Holdman	April 10, 2006	3.63
Ephram talks Kyle into accepting the invitation of a pretty classmate to go to a school dance, but when Kyle has a terrible evening, Ephram finally faces his suspicions that Kyle may be gay. Feeling that he has made things worse for Kyle, Ephram turns to Amy and Andy for advice. Ellie, a girl with a family history of breast cancer, asks Andy to perform a preventative mastectomy, and Harold is appalled at Andy's decision. In an attempt to put the excitement back in her relationship with Bright, Hannah throws a Hawaiian luau for two.
81	14	"Across the Lines"	Peter Markle	Barbie Kligman	April 17, 2006	3.82
After witnessing a car crash, Andy and Jake save the life of an intoxicated driver and end up disagreeing over reporting him to the police. But Andy convinces Jake that it would only be a 72-hour lockup. Jake is disappointed in traditional recovery programs and tired of going to one far out of town, so he creates a recovery program in Everwood. Placed on academic probation, Reid cheats on an exam. Rose dismisses Harold when he suspects a member of her support group, Bill Schmicker, is attracted to her.
82	15	"The Land of Confusion"	Charles Stratton	Tom Garrigus	April 24, 2006	3.77
Ephram plans to transfer to Colorado A&M, but Andy counsels him not to choose a school just to be near Amy. Knowing that Ephram regrets his lost opportunity at Juilliard, Andy sets up a meeting for him with a concert pianist, and it helps Ephram decide to transfer to Colorado A&M. Ephram next achieves closure with Madison by phoning her. With things starting to feel back on track, Nina tells Andy she is proposing to Jake. Finally, Bright is unable to admit to Hannah that the absence of sex in their relationship is hard for him. After they quarrel, Bright runs into Ada and makes a terrible mistake.
83	16	"Truth"	Matt Shakman	Nancy Won	May 1, 2006	3.72
Ephram learns that Bright cheated on Hannah and is outraged. When Ephram confides in Amy, she also confronts Bright and convinces him that he must tell Hannah the truth. Harold asks Andy to protect his lie on the adoption application regarding Rose's cancer. Irv takes Edna along on his book tour appearance in San Diego, and they spend time with Irv's daughter Cassie—who is not happy about her father's remarriage but has other, far stronger issues with him. Reid's desperate actions lead to terrible news from his medical school advisors. Harold confesses to Rose the fear that drove him to lie on the adoption papers. When Bright visits Hannah, he confesses and apologizes, upsetting Hannah, who orders him to leave.
84	17	"All the Lonely People"	Joyce Chopra	Anna Fricke	May 8, 2006	4.27
Devastated by his expulsion, Reid tries to commit suicide. Ephram rescues him, but cannot forgive himself for missing the signs of Reid's depression. Andy and Nina are caught in a compromising situation when Nina admits she may still have feelings for Andy. Trying to win Rose's forgiveness, Harold buys her a necklace, but Bright takes the necklace to give it to Hannah as an apology for his affair.
85	18	"Enjoy the Ride"	Charles Stratton	Natasha Billawala	May 15, 2006	2.57
Just out of the hospital, Reid asks Amy out on a date. Amy talks a reluctant Hannah on a double date with Amy's friend Nick, leaving Bright to deal with his pain and jealousy. Delia panics when her Bat Mitzvah falls on the same day as the birthday party of the most popular girl at school. Nina tries to deal with her confusing emotions over Andy and realizes she will have to make a decision when Jake asks her to move to Los Angeles.
86	19	"Reckoning"	David Petrarca	David Hudgins	May 22, 2006	3.22
Andy, Ephram and Delia are all shocked by a visit from Andy's estranged father, whom they have not seen for 15 years. Ephram and Amy take Bright out to celebrate his 21st birthday, but Bright drinks too much, falls through a window and ends up in the hospital. Hannah rushes from her date with Nick to be at Bright's side. Nina decides to move to Los Angeles with Jake, which devastates Andy. Irv and Edna decide to buy an RV and spend their retirement traveling the country.
87	20	"Goodbye, Love"	Joe Pennella	Greg Berlanti & Rina Mimoun	May 29, 2006	3.22
The whole town gathers for Irv's funeral. After the funeral, Amy begins to rethink her relationship with Ephram. Ephram decides he should tell Nina that Andy has bought an engagement ring for her before she makes the final decision to leave Everwood with Jake. Finally, when Andy's father announces that his visit is over, he and Andy have an honest and long-overdue conversation about their feelings for one another.
88	21	"Foreverwood"	Bethany Rooney	Anna Fricke & Josh Reims	June 5, 2006	4.14
89	22	"Foreverwood"	Perry Lang	Rina Mimoun & David Hudgins	June 5, 2006	4.14
While packing up her house and preparing to leave Everwood with Jake, Nina tells Hannah that she knows Andy bought an engagement ring for her. Hannah convinces Nina to sneak into the house while the Browns are out to get a look at the ring. Later, Jake finds out about the ring and confronts Andy once again about his feelings for Nina. At Delia's Bat Mitzvah, Amy watches Ephram with his new girlfriend Stephanie and realizes her feelings for Ephram are still strong. And when one of Harold's patients leaves her baby on the Abbott's doorstep, Harold wrestles with the right course of action while Rose immediately becomes attached to the little girl. After their house has been sold, Nina and Sam temporarily move in with the Browns. Wanting to take care of an unresolved issue in his life before he can propose to Nina, Andy travels briefly to New York—and visits his late wife's grave, where he speaks openly about his remade life and moving forward at last. Bright, transferring to Colorado A&M, is devastated at the thought that Hannah may accept her Notre Dame scholarship. Edna upsets Harold and Rose when she reveals her plans to leave Everwood. Delia is thrilled with Andy's belated Bat Mitzvah gift—something he promised her when they first moved to Everwood. Without telling Bright, Hannah applies to Colorado A&M. Finally, when Amy tells Rose (her mother) that she plans to tell Ephram about her feelings for him, she steps up her game to compete for Ephram's affections—using something that compelled them to admit their feelings once before.

== Ratings ==
Everwood : U.S. viewers per episode (millions)

Season	Episode number																							Average
Season	1	2	3	4	5	6	7	8	9	10	11	12	13	14	15	16	17	18	19	20	21	22	23	Average
1	7.43	5.54	6.11	6.66	6.50	5.84	6.31	6.39	5.94	6.10	6.96	5.44	6.67	5.68	6.37	5.69	5.29	5.99	4.62	4.49	5.50	5.37	5.55	5.91
2	5.93	6.38	5.74	5.96	5.29	5.14	5.35	5.99	6.32	5.87	5.48	5.20	4.42	6.07	5.22	4.93	4.21	4.33	5.01	5.23	5.70	6.38	–	5.45
3	5.97	5.57	4.92	5.05	5.05	5.64	5.35	4.71	5.28	5.09	4.03	4.40	4.25	4.70	4.28	5.20	4.42	4.39	4.21	4.44	4.42	4.77	–	4.82
4	3.51	4.03	4.14	4.07	3.91	3.59	3.68	4.22	3.91	3.58	3.52	3.77	3.63	3.82	3.77	3.72	4.27	2.57	3.22	3.22	4.14	4.14	–	3.75

Audience measurement performed by Nielsen Media Research
