= Everwood =

2002 American drama television series

- Genre: Drama
- Created by: Greg Berlanti
- Starring: Treat Williams; Gregory Smith; Emily VanCamp; Debra Mooney; John Beasley; Vivien Cardone; Chris Pratt; Tom Amandes; Stephanie Niznik; Merrilyn Gann
- Composer: Blake Neely
- Country of origin: United States
- Original language: English
- No. of seasons: 4
- No. of episodes: 89 (list of episodes)

Production
- Executive producers: Greg Berlanti; Mickey Liddell; Rina Mimoun; Andrew A. Ackerman; Michael Green
- Running time: 42–45 minutes
- Production companies: Berlanti-Liddell Productions; Warner Bros. Television

Original release
- Network: The WB
- Release: September 16, 2002 – June 5, 2006

Everwood (released as Our New Life in Everwood in the UK) is an American drama television series created by Greg Berlanti, starring Treat Williams and Gregory Smith. The series aired on the WB from September 16, 2002, to June 5, 2006, with a total of 89 episodes spanning four seasons. The series also stars Vivien Cardone, Emily VanCamp, Chris Pratt, Debra Mooney, Stephanie Niznik, John Beasley and Tom Amandes.

The series concluded on June 5, 2006, after having been canceled by the WB in May 2006 following the network’s merger with UPN to form The CW.

== Plot ==
Everwood follows Dr. Andrew “Andy” Brown, a widowed neurosurgeon who relocates from New York City to the small town of Everwood, Colorado, with his two children, Ephram and Delia, after the death of his wife. The move forces the family to confront their grief while adjusting to small-town life. Andy’s arrival disrupts the local medical community, particularly his relationship with longtime town doctor Harold Abbott, though their professional rivalry gradually develops into mutual respect and friendship.

Much of the series centers on Ephram’s difficult adolescence, his strained relationship with his father, and his long-standing feelings for Amy Abbott, Harold’s daughter. Early storylines focus on Andy’s decision to return temporarily to neurosurgery in an attempt to save Amy’s boyfriend, Colin Hart, who has been in a coma following a car accident. Although the operation initially appears successful, Colin later dies from complications, a decision that leaves Andy ostracized by the town and deeply affects Amy, who struggles with grief and depression.

As the series progresses, the characters face personal and ethical challenges involving illness, addiction, loss, and forgiveness. Ephram pursues his talent as a pianist while navigating romantic relationships and resentment toward his father. Ephram's relationship with Madison, Delia's 20-year-old babysitter, and her eventual pregnancy further strains his relationship with Andy but serves as a catalyst for Ephram’s emotional growth and reconciliation.

The ensemble cast is further developed through subplots involving Harold and his wife Rose, whose marriage is tested by political pressures and Rose’s battle with cancer; Bright Abbott’s gradual maturation after years of recklessness; and Nina Feeney, Andy’s neighbor, whose on-again, off-again relationship with Andy is complicated by her own romantic entanglements and responsibilities as a single mother.

In the final season, the characters confront adulthood and long-term commitments. Ephram rediscovers his passion for music through teaching and chooses a future in music education, while Amy struggles to define her identity outside of her relationship with him. Following personal losses, including the death of Edna Harper’s husband Irv, and the collapse of Nina’s engagement to another man, Andy and Nina finally acknowledge their feelings for each other and become engaged.

The series concludes with Ephram and Amy reuniting in a more mature relationship, Andy finding personal happiness and stability in Everwood, and the town’s residents moving forward after years of shared hardship and growth.

== Cast ==
=== Main ===
- Treat Williams as Andy Brown: A widowed neurosurgeon who moves his family to Everwood
- Gregory Smith as Ephram Brown: Andy's son, a talented pianist
- Emily VanCamp as Amy Abbott: Harold's daughter
- Vivien Cardone as Delia Brown: Andy's daughter, Ephram's sister
- Debra Mooney as Edna Harper: A nurse, a friend of the Brown family, and Harold Abbott's mother
- John Beasley as Irv Harper: Edna's husband
- Chris Pratt as Bright Abbott: Amy's brother
- Tom Amandes as Harold Abbott: Everwood's established physician and Amy and Bright's father
- Stephanie Niznik as Nina Feeney (main seasons 2–4; recurring season 1): Andy's neighbor
- Merrilyn Gann as Rose Abbott (main seasons 3–4; recurring seasons 1–2): Everwood's mayor and Harold's wife

=== Recurring ===
- Mike Erwin as Colin Hart (seasons 1–2): Amy's first boyfriend who fell into a coma after an accident
- Nora Zehetner as Laynie Hart (seasons 1–2): Colin's sister and a friend of Amy and Ephram
- Marcia Cross as Linda Abbott (season 2): A doctor and Harold's sister
- Sarah Lancaster as Madison Kellner (seasons 2–3): Delia's babysitter and Ephram's older girlfriend
- Paul Wesley as Tommy Callahan (season 2): A town resident who becomes involved with Amy
- Scott Wolf as Jake Hartman (seasons 3–4): A doctor who competes with Andy and Harold
- Sarah Drew as Hannah Rogers (seasons 3–4): Amy's friend and Bright's eventual girlfriend
- Anne Heche as Amanda Hayes (season 3): A town resident who becomes involved with Andy
- Justin Baldoni as Reid Bardem (season 4): A medical student involved with Amy

== Production ==
The series was co-produced by Berlanti-Liddell Productions in association with Warner Bros. Television. Greg Berlanti, Mickey Liddell, Rina Mimoun, Andrew A. Ackerman and Michael Green served as executive producers.

The pilot was filmed in Calgary and Canmore, Alberta, as well as Denver, Colorado; after that, series filming took place in Ogden, South Salt Lake, Draper, and Park City, Utah.

The series concluded on June 5, 2006. It was canceled by the WB on May 17, 2006, after four seasons, following the merger with UPN to form The CW.

=== Series finale ===
Everwood's series finale, which aired on Monday, June 5, 2006, was seen by 4.07 million viewers.

The final episode, "Foreverwood", was written as both a season and a series finale. Because of the impending WB/UPN merger into The CW, the future of the series was uncertain, and the producers wrote two endings. Originally, the producers had scripted a montage for the "series-finale cut" that went forty years into the future to show a majority of the regular characters at Andy's funeral, showing the series coming full circle; this was never filmed due to budgetary reasons as well as the producers' hopes that they would receive a fifth season.

Everwood was canceled in favor of a new series, Runaway, which Dawn Ostroff then canceled after only three episodes had aired, and for a new season of 7th Heaven, which had just had its series finale. The finale of 7th Heaven had 7 million viewers. Everwood had an average of 4 million viewers (which, if it was sustained, would have put it in the top 5 CW ratings for the following year).

== Episodes ==
Season	Episodes	Originally released	
Season	Episodes	First released	Last released
1	23	September 16, 2002	May 19, 2003
2	22	September 15, 2003	May 10, 2004
3	22	September 13, 2004	May 23, 2005
4	22	September 29, 2005	June 5, 2006

== Home media ==
Warner Home Video has released all four seasons of Everwood on DVD in Region 1. While the entire series was shot in 16:9 widescreen, the first season DVD is presented in a cropped 4:3 aspect ratio. The final three season releases retain the original 16:9 aspect ratio; they also feature extensive music substitutions. In Region 2, Warner Home Video has also released all four seasons on DVD in Germany and in the Netherlands, and the first two seasons in Hungary. In Region 4, Warner Home Video has released the first season on DVD in Australia.

DVD name	Ep#	Release dates	
DVD name	Ep#	Region 1	Region 2 (NED)
The Complete First Season	23	September 7, 2004	September 15, 2010
The Complete Second Season	22	June 16, 2009	December 1, 2010
The Complete Third Season	22	June 15, 2010	February 9, 2011
The Complete Fourth Season	22	August 2, 2011	August 24, 2011

== Reception ==
=== Critical response ===
Critical response of Everwood
Season	Rotten Tomatoes	Metacritic
1	75% (16 reviews)	61 (26 reviews)
2	100% (5 reviews)	—N/a
3	100% (5 reviews)	—N/a
4	100% (6 reviews)	—N/a

Robert Bianco for USA Today was not enthusiastic about the show's premiere and gave it a two-star rating out of four. He found that Everwood's main problem was that it "never knows when the corn syrup is thick enough" due to its clichés. On the more positive side, he wrote, "Clearly, WB's goal here is to find an acceptable time-period companion for 7th Heaven, and it's entirely possible the network has. The scenery is pretty, Smith has the earmarks of a star in the making, and Williams actually is quite appealing—when the script isn't forcing him to behave as if he were insane." TV Guide was critical of the pilot episode and accused it of being a "bit excessive and sentimental" and self-consciously quirky, but that "it's beautifully acted, crisply written and has first-rate production values."

Advocacy group the Parents Television Council ranked Everwood as the group's No. 1 "worst network TV show for family viewing" on their list of the 2003–04 season. The PTC criticized "the careless and irresponsible treatment of sexual issues—especially when the teenaged characters are involved" and stated "Everwood's reckless messages about sex without consequences are expressly targeted to impressionable teens." Entertainment Weekly reviewed positively the show's third season in 2005 giving it an A− and commented, "Everwood's soap tropes—unexpected pregnancy, adultery—handles these stories artfully."

In 2003, TV Guide named Everwood one of "The Best Shows You May Not Be Watching".

=== Ratings ===
Seasonal rankings (based on average total viewers per episode) of Everwood on the WB.

Season	Timeslot	Season premiere	Season finale	TV season	Rank	Rank Network	Viewers (in millions)
1	Monday 9/8c	September 16, 2002	May 19, 2003	2002–2003	#124	#3/17	4.8
2	Monday 9/8c	September 15, 2003	May 10, 2004	2003–2004	#109	#4/19	4.6
3	Monday 9/8c	September 13, 2004	May 23, 2005	2004–2005	#117	#4/19	4.3
4	Thursday 9/8c (September 29, 2005 – December 8, 2005); Monday 8/7c (March 27, 2006); Monday 9/8c (April 3, 2006 – May 29, 2006); Monday 8/7c (June 5, 2006)	September 29, 2005	June 5, 2006	2005–2006	#130	#6/19	3.6

=== Accolades ===
Everwood received two Emmy nominations: Outstanding Main Title Theme Music (2003) written by Blake Neely, and Outstanding Guest Actor in a Drama Series (2004) for James Earl Jones's turn as Will Cleveland.

Treat Williams has also received two Screen Actors Guild award nominations in 2003 and 2004 for his role as Dr. Andy Brown.
