= Vivien Cardone =

American actress

- Born: April 14, 1993 (age 33); Port Jefferson, New York, U.S.
- Occupation: Actress
- Years active: 1998–present

Vivien Cardone (born April 14, 1993) is an American actress, known for her role as Doctor Brown's daughter Delia on The WB's Everwood from 2002 to 2006. She has appeared in One Life to Live (2011) and Theater, Interrupted (2020–2021).

== Early life ==
Cardone was born in Port Jefferson, New York. She is one of four children. Her older sister Olivia was an actress. She has a brother and another sister. The Cardone children were homeschooled, Vivien entered school in 2005.

== Career ==
Cardone began her professional acting career at the age of three months in national campaign commercials, for such companies as Pizza Hut, Sears, Pillsbury, and Sherwin-Williams. Her first film performance was as Marcee Herman in the Academy Award winning film A Beautiful Mind. Her biggest role so far has been in Everwood, in which she played Delia Brown. She played the role for four seasons, until the show was cancelled in May 2006. She was nominated for a Young Artist Award for Best Supporting Young Actress in a TV series for all four seasons.

In 2008, Cardone starred in the film All Roads Lead Home. In it she plays Belle, a 12-year-old girl who has to cope with the loss of her mother from an automobile accident. It stars Peter Coyote, Jason London and Peter Boyle in his last film. She appeared in an episode of Law & Order: Criminal Intent in 2010. In 2011, Cardone starred as Michelle in eight episodes of One Life to Live.

== Filmography ==
=== Film ===
Year	Title	Role	Notes
2001	A Beautiful Mind	Marcee	
2008	All Roads Lead Home	Belle Lawlor	

=== Television ===
Year	Title	Role	Notes
2002–2006	Everwood	Delia Brown	Main role - 89 episodes
2010	Law & Order: Criminal Intent	Paulette Bartol	1 episode: "Delicate"
2011	One Life to Live	Michelle	Recurring role - 8 episodes
2016	Law & Order: Special Victims Unit	Kristi Cryer	1 episode: "Star-Struck Victims"
2020–2021	Theater, Interrupted	Annette / Dr. Michelle Watkins / Martha	7 episodes
