= Everwood season 1 =

Everwood
- Season 1
- No. of episodes: 23

Release
- Original network: The WB
- Original release: September 16, 2002 – May 19, 2003

The first season of Everwood, an American drama television series, began airing on September 16, 2002, on the WB television network. The season concluded on May 16, 2003, after 23 episodes.

The season was released on DVD as a six-disc boxed set under the title of Everwood: The Complete First Season on May 4, 2004, by Warner Bros. Home Entertainment.

== Cast ==
The initial season had eight major roles getting star billing in the opening credits. Treat Williams portrayed Dr. Andrew "Andy" Brown, the newly widowed father of Ephram Brown (portrayed by Gregory Smith) and Delia Brown (portrayed by Vivien Cardone) and runs his own clinic "free of charge" in an abandoned train station. Emily VanCamp portrayed Amy Abbott, who befriends Ephram and is the girlfriend of Colin Hart, who, throughout the first half of the season, is still in a coma. Debra Mooney portrayed Edna Harper, a semi-retired army nurse and Harold's estranged mother. John Beasley portrayed Irv Harper, the kind-hearted husband of Edna and the narrator of the series. Chris Pratt portrayed Bright Abbott, the older brother of Amy and best friend of Colin. Tom Amandes portrayed Dr. Harold Abbott, the father of Amy and Bright, who begins a friendly rivalry with Andy.

=== Main cast ===
- Treat Williams as Andy Brown
- Gregory Smith as Ephram Brown
- Emily VanCamp as Amy Abbott
- Debra Mooney as Edna Harper
- John Beasley as Irv Harper
- Vivien Cardone as Delia Brown
- Chris Pratt as Bright Abbott
- Tom Amandes as Harold Abbott

== Episodes ==
No. overall	No. in season	Title	Directed by	Written by	Original release date	Viewers (millions)
1	1	"Pilot"	Mark Piznarski	Greg Berlanti	September 16, 2002	7.43
After his wife is killed in a car accident, Dr. Andrew (Andy) Brown (Treat Williams) moves his 15-year-old son, Ephram (Gregory Smith), and 9-year-old daughter, Delia (Vivien Cardone), to the idyllic Everwood, Colorado, to make a new start. In the opener, the relocation sparks harsh words and hurt feelings between the emotionally distant father and his neglected son, despite Andy's attempts to reconnect with the teen. Bonding with Ephram is further hindered by Andy's decision not to explain the reason for leaving New York. The good doctor also runs afoul of the town's only other physician, Dr. Harold Abbott, when he decides to open his own practice right across the street from his rival's office, and not charge patients. Ephram falls for Amy Abbott, Harold's daughter, but learns she's still in love with her boyfriend Colin, who is in a coma after a car accident.
2	2	"The Great Doctor Brown"	Kathy Bates	Greg Berlanti	September 23, 2002	5.54
Andy and Ephram's fragile relationship is further strained when it appears that Andy is once again putting work before family. Meanwhile, as the town of Everwood celebrates its annual Fall Thaw Festival, Ephram's interest in Amy continues to blossom, and Delia gets into trouble at school for questioning her teacher's antiquated rules. Andrew hallucinates about Julia, which attracts unwanted attention from the townspeople. Ephram lies to Amy, telling her Andrew won't help Colin.
3	3	"Friendly Fire"	Danny Leiner	Oliver Goldstick	September 30, 2002	6.11
The community learns that Nina is a surrogate mother for a friend, which leads to a public debate between Dr. Brown and Dr. Abbott. Delia has trouble making new friends and has to face a bully. Wendell, a strange high school student, helps Ephram find a way to get closer with Amy. Amy invites Ephram to a party, but her friends don't want him there, so they dis-invite him. Nina gives birth in a diner, helped by Andy and Ephram.
4	4	"The Kissing Bridge"	Michael Schultz	Rina Mimoun	October 7, 2002	6.66
There is an STD epidemic in Everwood's Peak County High School. Both doctors team up to provide accurate education for the students. Ephram and Amy go to Denver so she can "invite" Colin to the fall ball. On the way to pick up their kids, the doctors exchange some tips on how to handle teenagers. Delia makes some progress with Magilla, the boy she has a crush on.
5	5	"Deer God"	Arlene Sanford	Michael Green	October 14, 2002	6.50
The Browns get "robbed" by a deer. Dr. Abbott is the recipient of a Colorado award and wants to show off. Ephram decides to hike and bring back the deer to a wildlife reserve because he identifies with it. Andy goes with him. Delia starts a quest to see if God really exists. Ephram finally asks his father if he can take a look at Colin.
6	6	"The Doctor Is In"	Stephen Gyllenhaal	Vanessa Taylor	October 21, 2002	5.84
It is the day of Colin's appointment with Dr. Brown. He gives Colin's parents a difficult choice: attempting a risky operation or hoping that Colin will wake up on his own. They decide not to go with the surgery. Amy tries to make them change their minds. Delia and Magilla get closer, but Magilla is drawn to girly games, which gets him and Delia in trouble. Magilla's parents don't want Delia anywhere near Magilla anymore because he was born a hermaphrodite, and they chose to raise him as a boy. He is finally sent to an all-boys school. Traveling psychologist Dr. Gretchen Trott comes to town and creates trouble for Dr. Abbott. It turns out that it was Dr. Brown who changed his mind for Colin's surgery.
7	7	"We Hold These Truths"	Jason Moore	Joan Binder Weiss	October 28, 2002	6.31
As Colin's surgery approaches, viewers are shown flashbacks of the days and hours which preceded the accident. We learn that Amy wasn't talking to Colin because he didn't answer "I love you" to her and that Bright was actually driving the car after drinking alcohol and caused the accident. He eventually tells his dad and Colin's parents. The surgery goes well but time is needed to know if it was completely successful.
8	8	"Till Death Do Us Part"	Michael Schultz	Oliver Goldstick	November 4, 2002	6.39
Everwood's Reverend Keyes is having allergies, which are probably caused by his wife. It's Dr. Brown's anniversary, which revives the pain of losing his wife. Dr. Abbott is trying to learn salsa. Amy is waiting for Colin to wake up. Ephram kisses Amy. Colin finally wakes up but doesn't seem to recognize Amy.
9	9	"Turf Wars"	Steve Gomer	Rina Mimoun	November 11, 2002	5.94
Colin's mother asks Amy to leave the hospital because she thinks Amy is making things worse. Julia's parents, Jacob and Ruth Hoffman, are in town. Jacob and Ephram have a confrontation with Andy on how to raise his son. Ephram sneaks out of the house to go to a party and tries to cheer up Amy. Delia and her grandmother bond. Ephram decides to go back to New York with his grandparents.
10	10	"Is There a Doctor in the House?"	Robert Duncan McNeill	Michael Green	November 18, 2002	6.14
Delia organizes a birthday party for Dr. Abbott's mother. A snowstorm during the party forces the attendees to remain at the Brown home overnight. Bright has appendicitis; unable to reach the nearest hospital, Dr. Brown has to operate on him at his office. Nina tells Andy to take a stand and talk with Jacob and Ephram. After Andy talks with Ephram, he decides to stay in Everwood.
11	11	"A Thanksgiving Tale"	David Petrarca	Vanessa Taylor	November 25, 2002	6.96
During his annual check-up, Dr. Abbott's physician discovers a spot on his brain. Dr. Abbott dreams that he dies and almost no one comes to his funeral. He is so affected that he tries to become popular by being nice to everyone and inviting the whole town to his house for Thanksgiving dinner. Ephram tries to make a traditional Thanksgiving dinner to please Delia, who wants the same Thanksgiving as when her mother was alive. Amy is torn up between her new feelings for Ephram and her love for Colin.
12	12	"Vegetative State"	Lev L. Spiro	John E. Pogue	January 6, 2003	5.44
A heartbroken Ephram finds himself the odd man out as Amy prepares for Colin's homecoming. Meanwhile, Andy and Dr. Abbott join the town in a debate over the use of medicinal marijuana after a large quantity is discovered in a deceased woman's greenhouse; and Andy provides medical guidance to Nina after her son's teacher suggests she put him on Ritalin.
13	13	"The Price of Fame"	Sandy Smolan	Rina Mimoun	January 20, 2003	6.67
Much to resident thespian Dr. Abbott's chagrin, Andy begrudgingly auditions and is offered the lead in Everwood's production of "The King and I." As Dr. Brown struggles with his lines, Ephram struggles with his emotions when his intense feelings for Amy are complicated by Colin's desire to be his friend.
14	14	"Colin the Second"	Mel Damski	Joan Binder Weiss	January 27, 2003	5.68
Although conflicted by his feelings for Amy, Ephram finds himself serving as confidante and friend to Amy's boyfriend, Colin, who continues to feel like a fish-out-of-water as he attempts to reclaim his life before the accident. Meanwhile, Andy hopes to convince Ephram to resume the piano lessons he abandoned after his mother's death; Nina's absentee husband comes home for a visit, which proves to be far from happily ever after; and in a bittersweet turn of events, Amy and Colin are nominated for Homecoming King and Queen.
15	15	"Snow Job"	David Petrarca	Michael Green	February 3, 2003	6.37
On a church ski trip chaperoned by perpetual party pooper Dr. Abbott, Amy and Colin share their first kiss since the surgery; Ephram finds himself intrigued by Colin's younger sister, Laynie, who has recently returned home from boarding school; and Bright attempts to get to the next base with his girlfriend. Meanwhile, Andy hesitantly agrees to attend a singles mixer with the recently divorced Reverend Keyes.
16	16	"My Funny Valentine"	Michael Schultz	Vanessa Taylor	February 10, 2003	5.69
When traveling psychologist Dr. Gretchen Trott comes back into town, Andy is forced to confront his potentially romantic feelings for her. In other romantic entanglements, Edna and Irv have difficulty adjusting to life after his heart attack scare; Harold and his wife Rose have it out after they attend couples therapy and she suggests that he's lost that lovin' feeling; and Ephram asks Laynie out on their first date, in part to show Amy that he's moving on with his life.
17	17	"Everwood Confidential"	Arlene Sanford	David Schulner	February 17, 2003	5.29
When Dr. Abbott's dementia-plagued, elderly godfather confesses to a murder that took place 30 years ago and reveals that Abbott's father was his accomplice, Abbott and Dr. Brown join the investigation in an attempt to find out what really happened and clear the men's names. Meanwhile, Ephram can't seem to keep Amy far from his thoughts, causing major problems in his burgeoning relationship with Laynie; and Andy and Ephram's new piano teacher butt heads over what is best for Ephram.
18	18	"The Unveiling"	Michael Schultz	Greg Berlanti & Rina Mimoun	February 24, 2003	5.99
Approaching the anniversary of his mother's death, Ephram confronts a repressed memory of his father cheating on his mother, causing an even bigger rift between father and son that eventually leads to a firestorm of emotions. Meanwhile, Amy grows concerned that Colin might not be recovering as well as everyone thinks when he gets violently ill on one of their dates. Laynie returns to boarding school.
19	19	"The Miracle of Everwood"	Arlene Sanford	Michael Green	April 21, 2003	4.62
Although Amy and Bright are still living in denial regarding the state of Colin's recovery, Ephram can't ignore the bad signs any longer after he witnesses Colin freaking out and vandalizing the gym teacher's office. Joel Hurwitz, a New York Magazine reporter, pays a visit to Dr. Brown in hopes of uncovering the truth behind the famed surgeon’s continuing to live in Everwood; and Delia decides to secretly spend the night in the Museum of History while on a school field trip.
20	20	"Moonlight Sonata"	Michael Schultz	Wendy Mericle & Patrick Sean Smith	April 28, 2003	4.49
A nervous Ephram feels the pressure of performing his first piano recital in Everwood; Dr. Brown and Dr. Abbott attempt to diagnose a man with a mysterious sleeping disorder that leaves welts on his body; and Amy pretends to want to spend time with her grandmother, Edna, in order to secretly see Colin while she's grounded.
21	21	"Episode 20"	David Petrarca	Greg Berlanti & Vanessa Taylor	May 5, 2003	5.05
Dr. Andy Brown confronts important moral and professional issues when a pregnant 18-year-old and her father come to him for guidance. Meanwhile, Ephram is humiliated in front of the entire school when his date for the Spring Formal ditches him at the dance to make out with her boyfriend; and Amy and Colin have a huge fight when she chooses to console Ephram against Colin's wishes.
22	22	"Fear Itself"	Michael Katleman	John E. Pogue	May 12, 2003	5.37
Resentful at being forced to accompany Andy and Irv to a remote lake cabin, Ephram takes a small boat out alone and his inexperience leads to a serious accident and a night of terror for Andy. Meanwhile, Colin and his parents must decide whether to allow Dr. Brown to perform a second dangerous surgery; and Nina confronts her husband Carl after she accidentally discovers he is having an affair.
23	23	"Home"	Sandy Smolan	Story by : Greg Berlanti & Vanessa Taylor; Teleplay by : Michael Green & Rina Mimoun	May 19, 2003	5.55
Andy reveals to Ephram the reason behind his decision to move from New York to Everwood. Amy and Bright spend all their time with Colin in the days and nights leading up to Colin's operation. Colin visits Andy and tells him that he doesn't want Andy to keep trying to save his life if it means that he will be mentally or physically disabled. Andy agrees, and Colin bleeds out during the operation. The episode ends with Andy walking in to tell the family.

== DVD release ==
The DVD of season one was released on September 7, 2004. It has been released in Regions 1, 2 and 4. As well as every episode from the season, the DVD release features bonus material such as unaired scenes, "Behind the Scenes Fun with Greg-and-Emily Cam", extended version of the Pilot, making-of featurette, "In Search of Everwood" and commentary on 4 key episodes by cast and crew.

The Complete First Season
Set details			Special features
23 episodes; 1022 minutes (Region 1); 976 minutes (Region 2); 6-disc set; 1.33:1 aspect ratio; Languages: English (Dolby Digital 2.0 Surround); Subtitles: English, French and Spanish (Region 1); Italian, Spanish, Hungarian, Portuguese, Dutch (Regions 2)			"Unaired Scenes"; "Behind the Scenes Fun with Greg-and-Emily Cam"; "Extended Version of the Pilot"; "Making-of Featurette In Search of Everwood"; "Commentary on 4 Key Episodes by Cast and Crew"
Release dates			"Unaired Scenes"; "Behind the Scenes Fun with Greg-and-Emily Cam"; "Extended Version of the Pilot"; "Making-of Featurette In Search of Everwood"; "Commentary on 4 Key Episodes by Cast and Crew"
United States	Netherlands	Australia	"Unaired Scenes"; "Behind the Scenes Fun with Greg-and-Emily Cam"; "Extended Version of the Pilot"; "Making-of Featurette In Search of Everwood"; "Commentary on 4 Key Episodes by Cast and Crew"
September 7, 2004	September 15, 2010	September 30, 2009	"Unaired Scenes"; "Behind the Scenes Fun with Greg-and-Emily Cam"; "Extended Version of the Pilot"; "Making-of Featurette In Search of Everwood"; "Commentary on 4 Key Episodes by Cast and Crew"
