= National Speakers Bureau =

National Speakers Bureau Inc.
- Company type: Private
- Industry: Meetings and mvents
- Founded: 1972
- Founder: John Palmer
- Headquarters: Libertyville, IL, United States
- Area served: United States
- Key people: Brian Palmer (President)
- Number of employees: 1-10
- Website: www.nationalspeakers.com

National Speakers Bureau is an Illinois-based speakers bureau. The firm, founded in 1972 by John Palmer, is currently led by Brian Palmer, who assumed the presidency in 1996.

== History ==
After working as a band leader for twenty years, John Palmer searched the yellow pages of New York City for an established business that he could translate to his hometown of Chicago. While there were established, professional speakers in Chicago, there was no speakers bureau that served the market at the national level. This led him to found the National Speakers Bureau in 1972. The first foray into the business came when Palmer arranged for Rod Serling, renowned screenwriter, to speak at Michigan State University.

Palmer's son, Brian Palmer, joined the National Speakers Bureau as a salesperson in 1980. In 1996, Brian was named President.

Since then, the company has continued to source speakers for organizations and associations internationally. National Speakers Bureau does not represent speakers exclusively. Their business model is to work for companies and recommend speakers based on their quality and fit.
