= List of Beck chapters =

Beck is a Japanese manga series written and illustrated by Harold Sakuishi that has been translated into several languages and spawned a small media franchise. It tells the story of a group of Japanese teenagers who form a rock band and their struggle to fame, focusing on 14-year-old Yukio "Koyuki" Tanaka, who until meeting guitar prodigy Ryusuke Minami was an average teen with a boring life. The series was originally published in monthly chapters in Monthly Shōnen Magazine from 1999 to April 5, 2008. A special 77-page side-story was later published in the magazine's October 2008 issue. The chapters and side-story were combined into 34 tankōbon volumes by Kodansha, which were published from February 17, 2000, to October 17, 2008.

Beck was licensed for an English-language release in North America by Tokyopop. Tokyopop's German branch published a German-language version. In January 2009, it was announced that Kodansha let all of Tokyopop's German licenses expire, thus including Beck. This subsequently led to Tokyopop's English license of Beck expiring as well, after only 12 volumes were published. In July 2018, ComiXology began releasing the series digitally. They released the first fourteen volumes simultaneously on July 5, volumes 15 through 22 on October 2, and volumes 23 through 34 on February 27, 2019. The series has been released in French, Italian, Korean and Chinese, by Delcourt/Akata, Dynit, Haksan Culture Company and Tong Li Publishing respectively.

== Volume list ==
No.	Original release date	Original ISBN	English release date	English ISBN
1	February 17, 2000	978-4-06-334278-9	July 12, 2005 (Tokyopop); July 5, 2018 (ComiXology)	978-1-59532-770-3
001.; 002.; 003.
2	March 16, 2000	978-4-06-334291-8	November 8, 2005 (Tokyopop); July 5, 2018 (ComiXology)	978-1-59532-771-0
004.; 005.; 006.; 007.
3	June 16, 2000	978-4-06-334307-6	March 7, 2006 (Tokyopop); July 5, 2018 (ComiXology)	978-1-59532-772-7
008.; 009.
4	July 17, 2000	978-4-06-334313-7	June 13, 2006 (Tokyopop); July 5, 2018 (ComiXology)	978-1-59532-773-4
010.; 011.; 012.
5	October 17, 2000	978-4-06-334340-3	September 12, 2006 (Tokyopop); July 5, 2018 (ComiXology)	978-1-59532-774-1
013.; 014.; 015.
6	February 16, 2001	978-4-06-334381-6	December 12, 2006 (Tokyopop); July 5, 2018 (ComiXology)	978-1-59532-775-8
016.; 017.; 018.
7	May 17, 2001	978-4-06-334404-2	March 13, 2007 (Tokyopop); July 5, 2018 (ComiXology)	978-1-59532-776-5
019.; 020.; 021.
8	August 10, 2001	978-4-06-334451-6	June 12, 2007 (Tokyopop); July 5, 2018 (ComiXology)	978-1-59532-777-2
022.; 023.; 024.
9	November 16, 2001	978-4-06-334469-1	September 11, 2007 (Tokyopop); July 5, 2018 (ComiXology)	978-1-59532-778-9
025.; 026.; 027.
10	February 15, 2002	978-4-06-334507-0	December 11, 2007 (Tokyopop); July 5, 2018 (ComiXology)	978-1-59532-779-6
028.; 029.; 030.
11	May 17, 2002	978-4-06-334545-2	March 4, 2008 (Tokyopop); July 5, 2018 (ComiXology)	978-1-59532-780-2
031.; 032.; 033.
12	August 16, 2002	978-4-06-334581-0	June 10, 2008 (Tokyopop); July 5, 2018 (ComiXology)	978-1-59532-781-9
034.; 035.; 036.
13	November 15, 2002	978-4-06-334622-0	July 5, 2018 (ComiXology)	—
037.; 038.; 039.
14	February 17, 2003	978-4-06-334671-8	July 5, 2018 (ComiXology)	—
040.; 041.; 042.
15	June 17, 2003	978-4-06-334732-6	October 2, 2018 (ComiXology)	—
043.; 044.; 045.
16	September 17, 2003	978-4-06-334772-2	October 2, 2018 (ComiXology)	—
046.; 047.; 048.
17	December 17, 2003	978-4-06-334823-1	October 2, 2018 (ComiXology)	—
049.; 050.; 051.
18	March 17, 2004	978-4-06-334850-7	October 2, 2018 (ComiXology)	—
052.; 053.; 054.
19	June 17, 2004	978-4-06-334878-1	October 2, 2018 (ComiXology)	—
055.; 056.; 057.
20	October 15, 2004	978-4-06-334924-5	October 2, 2018 (ComiXology)	—
058.; 059.; 060.
21	January 17, 2005	978-4-06-334959-7	October 2, 2018 (ComiXology)	—
061.; 062.; 063.
22	April 15, 2005	978-4-06-334999-3	October 2, 2018 (ComiXology)	—
064.; 065.; 066.
23	July 15, 2005	978-4-06-372035-8	February 27, 2019 (ComiXology)	—
067.; 068.; 069.
24	October 17, 2005	978-4-06-372088-4	February 27, 2019 (ComiXology)	—
070.; 071.; 072.
25	January 17, 2006	978-4-06-372127-0	February 27, 2019 (ComiXology)	—
073.; 074.; 075.
26	April 17, 2006	978-4-06-372139-3	February 27, 2019 (ComiXology)	—
076.; 077.; 078.
27	August 17, 2006	978-4-06-372183-6	February 27, 2019 (ComiXology)	—
079.; 080.; 081.
28	November 17, 2006	978-4-06-372228-4	February 27, 2019 (ComiXology)	—
082.; 083.; 084.
29	February 16, 2007	978-4-06-372266-6	February 27, 2019 (ComiXology)	—
085.; 086.; 087.
30	June 15, 2007	978-4-06-372308-3	February 27, 2019 (ComiXology)	—
088.; 089.; 090.; 091.
31	November 16, 2007	978-4-06-372365-6	February 27, 2019 (ComiXology)	—
092.; 093.; 094.
32	February 15, 2008	978-4-06-375445-2	February 27, 2019 (ComiXology)	—
095.; 096.; 097.
33	June 17, 2008	978-4-06-375492-6	February 27, 2019 (ComiXology)	—
098.; 099.; 100.
34	October 17, 2008	978-4-06-375575-6	February 27, 2019 (ComiXology)	—
101.; 102.; "The Last Day of Eddie Lee"
