= Gorilla Man (disambiguation) =

Gorilla Man may refer to:

- The Gorilla Man, an American drama film
- Gorilla-Man, a moniker of several characters in Marvel Comics
- Gorillaman, a Japanese manga series
