= Hozumi Gōda =

Japanese voice actor, narrator and sound director

- Born: August 22, 1957 (age 69); Tokyo, Japan
- Occupations: Voice actor; narrator; sound director
- Years active: 1982–present
- Notable work: Hunter × Hunter (1999) as Leorio; Armored Trooper Votoms as Chirico Cuvie

Hozumi Gōda (郷田 ほづみ, Gōda Hozumi; born 合田穂積, August 22, 1957 in Tokyo) is a Japanese voice actor, narrator and sound director affiliated with OGIPRO THE NEXT Co. Inc.. He is part of a three-man comedy team called Kaibutsu Land (怪物ランド).

== Filmography ==
=== Anime television series ===
1980s

- Armored Trooper Votoms (1983) (Chirico Cuvie)

1990s

- Rurouni Kenshin (1996) (Lorenzo Shōzō)
- Blue Submarine No. 6 (1998) (Hayami Tetsu)
- Beast Wars II: Super Life-Form Transformers (1998) (Lio Convoy)
- Super Life-Form Transformers: Beast Wars Neo (1999) (Lio Convoy)
- Hunter × Hunter (1999) (Leorio)

2000s

- Yu-Gi-Oh! Duel Monsters (2000) (Jean Claude Magnum)
- The Prince of Tennis (2001) (Mamoru Inoue)
- Jing: King of Bandits (2002) (Campari)
- Last Exile (2003) (Vincent Alzey)
- R.O.D the TV (2003) (Joe "Joker" Carpenter)
- Zatch Bell! (2003) (Kafka Sunbeam)
- Battle B-Daman (2004) (Shin)
- Shura no Toki – Age of Chaos (2004) (Izumi Mutsu)
- Yu-Gi-Oh! Duel Monsters GX (2004) (Mr. T/Trueman, Darkness)
- Full Metal Panic! The Second Raid (2005) (Vincent Blueno)
- Ginga Densetsu Weed (2005) (Tokimune)
- Absolute Boy (2005) (Jirō Hatori)
- Akubi Girl (2006) (Narration)
- Digimon Data Squad (2006) (Daimon Suguru)
- D.Gray-man (2007) (Suman Dark)
- Dragonaut: The Resonance (2007) (Kasuga Nozaki)
- Junjo Romantica: Pure Romance (2008) (Ijuuin Kyō)
- Strike Witches (2008) (Ichirou Miyafuji, Narrator)
- The Tower of Druaga (2008) (Melt)
- Vampire Knight (2008) (Headmaster Cross)
- Hetalia: Axis Powers (2009) (Roma Antiqua/Roman Empire)
- Metal Fight Beyblade (2009) (Hokuto)

2010s

- Strike Witches 2 (2010) (Ichirou Miyafuji, Narrator)
- Akame ga Kill! (2014) (Budo)
- Majin Bone (2014) (Dragon Bone)
- Luck & Logic (2016) (Utsutsuno Jarno)
- Battery (2016) (Makoto Tomura)
- One Piece (2017) (Nefertari Cobra)
- Altair: A Record of Battles (2017) (Yüz-Maske Selim )
- Beyblade Burst Evolution (2017) (Alexander Gilten / Ashtem)
- Kokkoku (2018) (Junji Sagawa)
- Welcome to Demon School! Iruma-kun (2019) (Narration)

2020s

- Dorohedoro (2020) (Asu)
- Gibiate (2020) (Guren Soshigaya)
- Healin' Good Pretty Cure (2020–2021) (King Byogen, Sarlow)
- Transformers War for Cybertron Trilogy (2020-2021) (Ratchet)
- Summoned to Another World for a Second Time (2023) (King Distinia)
- The Witch and the Beast (2024) (Jeff Enker)

=== Original video animations ===
- Armored Trooper Votoms (1985) (Chirico Cuvie)
- Legend of the Galactic Heroes Gaiden (1998) (Yang Wen-li)
- Read or Die (2001) (Joker)
- Hunter × Hunter (2002) (Leorio)
- Interlude (2004) (Ikuo Fuyuki)

=== Anime films ===
- Doraemon: Nobita and the Castle of the Undersea Devil (1983) (Announcer)
- Beast Wars II: Lio Convoy's Close Call! (1998) (Lio Convoy)
- Oshare Majo Love and Berry: Shiwase no Mahou (2007) (Mr. Blad)
- Cyborg 009 Vs. Devilman (2015) (Great Britain/007)

=== Tokusatsu ===
- Gosei Sentai Dairanger (1993) (Fast-Talking Player (voice of human form) (ep. 29–30))

=== Game ===
- Interlude (2003) (Ikuo Fuyuki)
- Everybody's Golf 4 (2003) (Falcon)
- Tales of Hearts (2008) (Kunzite)
- Tekken 6 (2009) (Tougou)
- Super Robot Wars series (2011–present) (Chirico Cuvie)

=== Musical ===
- Musical Hunter × Hunter (2000) (Leorio, Mr.Gozumi)
- Hunter × Hunter: Dejavu in Summer (2001) (Leorio, Mr.Gozumi)
- Hunter × Hunter: The Nightmare of Zaoldyeck (2002) (Leorio)

=== Drama CDs ===
- Yasashikute Toge ga Aru (Kippei Asakura)
- Antique Bakery (Yusuke Ono)

=== Dubbing ===
==== Live-action ====
- David Thewlis
  - Harry Potter and the Prisoner of Azkaban (2004) (Remus Lupin)
  - Harry Potter and the Order of the Phoenix (2007) (Remus Lupin)
  - Harry Potter and the Half-Blood Prince (2009) (Remus Lupin)
  - Harry Potter and the Deathly Hallows – Part 1 (2010) (Remus Lupin)
  - Harry Potter and the Deathly Hallows – Part 2 (2011) (Remus Lupin)
- 12 Angry Men (2003 NHK edition) (Juror #5 (Dorian Harewood))
- The Affair of the Necklace (Nicholas de Lamotte (Adrien Brody))
- Alice Through the Looking Glass (Wilkins (Matt Vogel))
- Alien: The Director's Cut (Captain Dallas (Tom Skerritt))
- Ally McBeal (Larry Paul (Robert Downey Jr.))
- And Then There Were None (Doctor Edward Armstrong (Toby Stephens))
- Birth of the Dragon (Wong Jack-man (Xia Yu))
- Bridesmaids (Officer Nathan Rhodes (Chris O'Dowd))
- Desperate Housewives (Tom Scavo (Doug Savant))
- Grace of Monaco (Rainier III (Tim Roth))
- Hannibal (Netflix edition) (Paul Krendler (Ray Liotta))
- High Crimes (Tom Kubik (Jim Caviezel))
- Hope Springs (Dr. Bernie Feld (Steve Carell))
- Hypnotic (Dellrayne (William Fichtner))
- I Am Sam (2005 NTV edition) (Mr. Turner (Richard Schiff))
- Mad Max 2 (2015 Supercharger edition) (Pappagallo (Michael Preston))
- The Martian (Theodore "Teddy" Sanders (Jeff Daniels))
- The Mentalist (Patrick Jane (Simon Baker))
- The Monuments Men (Lt. Frank Stokes (George Clooney))
- Norman (Micha Eshel (Lior Ashkenazi))
- Steve Jobs (John Sculley (Jeff Daniels))

==== Animation ====
- Brave (Lord MacInstosh)
- Elias: The Little Rescue Boat (Smacky)
- Epic (Mandrake)
