= Beast Wars II: Lio Convoy's Close Call! =

Beast Wars II: Lio Convoy in Imminent Danger!
- Cover of the first VHS release
- Directed by: Akira Nishimori
- Written by: Toshiyasu Nagata
- Music by: Masae Sagara
- Production company: Ashi Productions
- Distributed by: Toei Company
- Release date: December 19, 1998
- Running time: 47 minutes

Beast Wars II: Lio Convoy in Imminent Danger! (ビーストウォーズII ライオコンボイ危機一髪!, Bīsuto Wōzu Sekando: Raio Konboi Kiki Ippatsu!) is a 1998 anime film based on the Beast Wars II: Super Life-Form Transformers anime series, a Japan-only spin-off of the Beast Wars television show. The film was never released outside Japan because Beast Wars II aired only in Japan, as a filler series that aired between dubbing the first and second seasons of Beast Wars in Japan. It was released as part of Beast Wars Special Super Lifeform Transformers (ビーストウォーズ スペーシャル 超生命体トランスフォーマー), as one of three features within it. The others are Clash! Beast Warriors, which is a clip show that recaps the first season of Beast Wars, and Beast Wars Metals, which was the Japanese dubbed version of the Beast Wars season 2 episode "Bad Spark". The entire special was distributed to Japanese theatres by Toei Company, though Ashi Productions provided the animation for the Beast Wars II portion of the movie.

The film revolves around the Maximals, led by Lio Convoy; the Predacons, led by Galvatron; and a mysterious device that has crashed on Planet Gaia (a future version of Earth), leading to the arrival of Maximal warrior, and the protagonist of the original Beast Wars series, Optimus Primal. Galvatron also uses the device to summon a monster Decepticon called Majin Zarak, who threatens to destroy all the Maximals.

== Plot ==
In Gaia's atmosphere, the Jointrons and the Seacons battle each other but both factions are interrupted by the arrival of a large spaceship which rams into them and sends them all flying into space before crash landing on the planet, and the Maximals and Predacons are immediately alerted. At the Maximal base, Lio Junior is frustrated over being treated like a child until Lio Convoy sends him with a unit to investigate the ship. There, the group discovers a "teleport gate", an ancient device capable of opening a doorway into the past and transporting any living creature into the present, but it requires a control unit to function, which the Predacons swoop in and steal. Lio Junior impulsively goes after them and retrieves the control unit, though Tasmanian Kid is seriously wounded in the resulting fight. The other Maximals blame Lio Junior for Kid's condition, with Lio Convoy scolding him for not prioritizing the safety of his comrades. Lio Junior declares that no one respects him and runs off alone, still holding the control unit.

Aware that Lio Junior is desperate to prove himself to the other Maximals, Galvatron seeks him out and deceives him, convincing him that the teleport gate will destroy the whole planet unless the control unit is returned. Despite Kid's begging him not to believe it, Lio Junior accompanies Galvatron back to the Predacon base, where he's taken prisoner. Galvatron activates the teleport gate and attempts to summon Megatron to assist the Predacons, but instead summons the colossal Majin Zarak, whom Galvatron declares a weapon even more powerful than Megatron. Galvatron assumes command of the seemingly mindless giant in aircraft carrier mode and starts attacking the Maximals. Meanwhile, Lio Junior escapes, then reunites and reconciles with Santon and Skywarp. They combine into Magnaboss before returning to the teleport gate, which is out of energy and nonfunctional. Putting himself at risk, Magnaboss uses his own spark energy to activate it and summon Convoy (Optimus Primal) to assist them.

After nearly destroying Lio Convoy with Majin Zarak, Galvatron receives a message from Convoy challenging him to a final faceoff. Believing Lio Convoy to have sent the message, Galvatron accepts and takes Majin Zarak to the indicated location. Meanwhile, Convoy appears to Lio Convoy to encourage him to continue fighting and inform him of the situation, praising Lio Junior's selflessness in summoning him. Lio Convoy joins Convoy and all the other Maximals at the showdown location, where Magnaboss defeats Majin Zarak, causing Galvatron to be ejected. With Majin Zarak inoperable the battle appears won, but Majin Zarak transforms on his own will, revealing that he is alive and not simply a weapon, and resumes attacking the Maximals. Scuba and Diver announce that attacking Majin Zarak's third eye will leave him vulnerable, and as he moves in to kill Convoy and Lio Convoy, the two combine their Energon Matrix powers and immensely power each other up as they launch a combined attack against Zarak and kill him.

After the battle, Convoy prepares to return to his own time, knowing that he's no longer needed here. Apache reveals that the spacetime warp created by the gate could destroy the universe. Before leaving, Convoy commends Lio Convoy and the other Maximals for their unity and accomplishment, telling them he is honored to have battled alongside them. After he departs through the gate, Lio Convoy orders it destroyed.

== Cast ==
Maximals

- Hozumi Gōda as Lio Convoy/Flash Lio Convoy
- Takehito Koyasu as Optimus Primal/Burning Convoy
- Yumiko Kobayashi as Lio Junior, Magnaboss
- Mantarô Iwao as Skywarp
- Hiroaki Harakawa as Santon
- Ryō Naitō as DJ, Tripledacus
- Daisuke Ishikawa as Motorarm
- Takeshi Maeda as Gimlet
- Katashi Ishizuka as Tasmania Kid
- Sanryo Odaka as Apache
- Masami Iwasaki as Bighorn
- Kenji Nakano as Diver
- Yūji Kishi as Scuba

Predacons

- Tetsuo Komura as Galvatron
- Takashi Matsuyama as Gigastorm
- Hiroki Takahashi as Hellscream
- Eiji Takemoto as Dirgegun
- Junji Sanechika as Thrustol
- Takeshi Watanabe as Max B
- Kazuhiko Nishimatsu as God Neptune, Halfshell

Other

- Haruhi Nanao as Computer Voice
- Takeshi Watanabe as Bigmos
