= Heavy Metal Thunder (video game) =

2005 video game

- Developer: Media.Vision
- Publisher: Square Enix
- Artist: Harold Sakuishi
- Platform: PlayStation 2
- Release: JP: September 1, 2005
- Genre: Action game
- Mode: Single-player

Heavy Metal Thunder (ヘビーメタルサンダー, Hebī Metaru Sandā) is an action game developed by Media.Vision and published by Square Enix for the PlayStation 2 in 2005. Exclusively released in Japan, production companies Satelight and How Full's participated in the creation of the game.

== Gameplay ==
The game pits futuristic robots against one another in wrestling matches. The player controls a robot during battles using a four-icon menu. Three actions—strike, guard and grapple—can be executed at any time and augments the player's "beat meter". The fourth action, called "beat attack", can be performed once the beat meter is filled and inflicts special damage according to how hard the button is pressed. Icons sometime shake to indicate that they are recommended, but the player must react quickly as each turn is timed. A rock-paper-scissors set of rules determined the winner of each pair of actions.

Anime cutscenes and fictional sponsor information are displayed before the start of each match. The player's robot can be customized to alter its appearance.

== Plot ==
The game is set in a fictional Japan in the year 2980, in which competitive fights between radio-controlled robots has become a popular sport called "Robot-ress". The player takes on the role of Denki Akihabara, a high-school student whose family runs a butcher shop. Denki decides to become a Robot-ress master after learning about Heavy Metal Thunder, the world's strongest robot. At the beginning of the game, he receives a robot and an invitation to the Titan Fight tournament from his father, who is actually the world champion and owner of Heavy Metal Thunder. The Titan Fight is a competition in which losing robots are destroyed and their owners buried on Death Island. The plot spans roughly thirty years in total, with Denki over forty years old at the end of the game.

== Development ==
Heavy Metal Thunder was announced at a special event held by Square Enix in Shibuya, Tokyo on March 2, 2005, with the presence of Japanese band Sex Machineguns. It is loosely adapted from Heavy Meta-san, a metal/hard rock show broadcast on TV Tokyo, hosted by gravure idol Yoko Kumada and sponsored by Square Enix. The characters of the game were designed by Harold Sakuishi, creator of the Beck manga series.

The game was showcased in playable form at the Square Enix Party 2005 in Japan.

=== Music ===
Album cover art

The music of Heavy Metal Thunder was composed by various heavy metal bands and musicians, including Michael Schenker and ex-Megadeth guitarist Marty Friedman. The eponymous song "Heavy Metal Thunder" written by Sex Machineguns serves as the theme song of both the game and the Heavy Meta-san TV show. The soundtrack of the game was published in Japan by Toshiba EMI on September 7, 2005.

Heavy Metal Thunder: The Recordings track listing
No.	Title	Music	Length
1.	"Heavy Metal Thunder"	Sex Machineguns feat. Michael Schenker	5:22
2.	"Robot's Ballad" (#ロボットのバラード)	Garlic Boys	4:03
3.	"The Beauty Power"	Rolly Teranishi & Komikurimo Pichnskey	3:58
4.	"Wandering the Byways" (流離い裏街道)	Saburō Tokitō with Marcy & Shara from Earthshaker	4:21
5.	"We are..."	Delta Throb	5:10
6.	"A Straight Shot to the Caterer's" (出前道一直線)	Sex Machineguns	4:12
7.	"Madness" (狂気)	Kow Otani & Hiroko Shigezumi from Smooth Ace	4:31
8.	"Love Terrorist"	Nanase Aikawa with Marty Friedman	3:48
9.	"Mask of Glory" (栄光のマスク)	Michael Schenker with Hiroyuki Namba	5:36
10.	"Riding a Dolphin" (イルカに乗って)	Sex Machineguns	4:24
Total length:			45:25

== Reception ==
Heavy Metal Thunder sold 3,367 copies in Japan the week of its release. Regional sales topped out at just 18,443 units by the end of 2005, according to Media Create. The game's producer, Takehiro Ando, stated that although he was proud of the work that was done on the project, he would accept the blame for its commercial failure due to his own inexperience in the field at the time.

Critically, it received a score of 30 out of 40 by the Japanese gaming magazine Famitsu. American multimedia website IGN considered the gameplay simple, but praised the amount of animation used and called the theme song "catchy". American website GameSpot echoed the comments, stating that the game relies on its atmosphere and cut scenes more than gameplay. IGN noted that the game would appeal to fans of Heavy Meta-san and hard rock in general.
