= The Band (manga) =

2024 Japanese manga series

- First tankōbon volume cover
- Genre: Music
- Manga
- Written by: Harold Sakuishi
- Published by: Kodansha
- Imprint: Monthly Shōnen Magazine Comics
- Magazine: Monthly Shōnen Magazine
- Original run: December 6, 2024 – present
- Volumes: 5

The Band (stylized in all caps) is a Japanese manga series written and illustrated by Harold Sakuishi. It began serialization in Kodansha's shōnen manga magazine Monthly Shōnen Magazine in December 2024.

== Synopsis ==
When he was in elementary school, Yūhei Araki was taken to a concert by his mother which moved him deeply. He later meets Shintaro Ibata, a student in his class who was at that same concert. The two become friends over their shared love of music, until a year and a half later, Shintaro transfers schools. Now in middle school, Araki encounters a peculiar looking guitar which kickstarts his interest in starting a band, and reunites with Shintaro.

== Production ==
The Band is Harold Sakuishi's first music or "band" manga in sixteen years, following Beck (1999–2008), and was created as part of celebrations for the 50th anniversary of Monthly Shōnen Magazine. The author wanted the protagonist to play a Japanese-made guitar. While looking for one with a shape that he personally could play without experiencing shoulder pain, Sakuishi stumbled upon the crescent-shaped Kawai Moonsault. After seeing its fretboard inlays that depict the phases of the moon, he had the inspiration for a manga scene and decided on using the Moonsault. Yūhei Araki plays a navy-blue MS-80 reissue from the 1990s, just like the one Sakuishi bought. For the other characters, the author selects their instruments based on the specific character, for example, he chose a slightly smaller bass guitar for a high school girl and might choose more affordable models for school students.

== Publication ==
Written and illustrated by Harold Sakuishi, The Band began serialization in Kodansha's shōnen manga magazine Monthly Shōnen Magazine on December 6, 2024. Its chapters have been collected in five tankōbon volumes as of August 2026.

No.	Release date	ISBN
1	April 16, 2025	978-4-06-538946-1
2	August 12, 2025	978-4-06-540168-2
3	December 17, 2025	978-4-06-541646-4
4	April 16, 2026	978-4-06-543004-0
5	August 17, 2026	978-4-06-544423-8

== Reception ==
The Band won the shōnen category of the Kodansha Gachi Manga Fair 2025, where 2,282 bookstore employees and readers were asked to choose the manga they found "seriously interesting and worth recommending". The series ranked eighth in the Nationwide Bookstore Employees' Recommended Comics list of 2026. The manga's first collected volume received a third printing only one week after its release.

In a review for Real Sound, Kazushi Shimada noted that the first chapter of The Band follows the same narrative structure as Sakuishi's previous work, Beck; "a lonely boy discovers guitar, finds liberation, confronts the world, and gains companions." He suggested the author might have intentionally chosen the similar structure in order to later diverge from it, because otherwise, it would have been easier and more fan-pleasing for Sakuishi to create "Beck 2".
