= Masami Iwasaki =

Japanese voice actor

- 岩崎 征実
- Born: October 25, 1971 (age 54); Tokyo, Japan
- Occupation: Voice actor
- Years active: 1990–present

Masami Iwasaki (岩崎 征実, Iwasaki Masami; born October 25, 1971) is a Japanese voice actor from Tokyo. Most but not all of his roles are minions or ruffians, but he is mostly known as the voice of Ryuji Goda in the Yakuza video game series.

== Filmography ==
=== Anime ===
- Autolauncher and Bighorn (Beast Wars II)
- Hardhead (Beast Wars Neo)
- Birdy (Bomberman Jetters)
- Build Cyclone and Wrecker Hook (Car Robot)
- Koji Kuroki, Cerberus, Kaoru Hatsujo, Morgan, and other misc. in (Eyeshield 21)
- Roland/Isono (Yu-Gi-Oh!)
- Akazawa Yoshiro (Prince of Tennis)
- Alfonso (Gunslinger Girl)
- Drake Anderson (R.O.D. the TV)
- Hiyoshi Wakashi (Prince of Tennis)
- Genba, Bat (Ginga Densetsu Weed)
- Baku's Mother (Onegai My Melody)
- Sawada Iemitsu (Katekyo Hitman Reborn)
- Lotten (Yu-Gi-Oh! 5D's)
- Jikochu, Proto Jikochu (DokiDoki! PreCure)
- Norway (Axis Powers: Hetalia)
- Chūshō Sa and Big Boss (Saiunkoku Monogatari)
- Dr. Immanuel Klipse (Monsuno)
- Gaidora (Transformers Go!)
- Hachibururn (ep 3), Aribomer (ep 6), Semitobun (ep 9) (Time Bokan 24)
- Dick Gumshoe (Ace Attorney)
- ZZ (JoJo's Bizarre Adventure: Stardust Crusaders)
- Lodin Haijima (Beyblade Burst GT)
- Yokumiru Mera (ep 53 to 57, ep 59 and 60) (My Hero Academia, season 3), (ep 78 to 80) (My Hero Academia, season 4), (ep 132 and 133) My Hero Academia, season 6
- Mr. Hat (Welcome to Demon School! Iruma-kun, season 3)

=== Tokusatsu ===
- Barukibaruki (ep 30), Bazoogas (ep 39) (Seijuu Sentai Gingaman)
- Sadondas β (Kamen Rider Fourze)
- Advanced Youkai Nue (ep 19 and 20) (Shuriken Sentai Ninninger)
- Hanayaida (ep 9) (Doubutsu Sentai Zyuohger)

=== Video games ===
- Ryuji Goda (Yakuza 2, Yakuza: Dead Souls and Yakuza Kiwami 2)
- Roy "Big Bo" Boateng (Binary Domain)
- Saigō Takamori (Like a Dragon: Ishin!)
- Goldion (Disgaea 5)
- Raoh (Fist of the North Star: Lost Paradise)
- Schwarzloch (Wuthering Waves)

=== Drama CDs ===
- Ousama na Neko (Alpha & Atsuo Nabeshima)

=== Dubbing ===
- The French Dispatch (Roebuck Wright (Jeffrey Wright), Paul Duval (Christoph Waltz))
