= Destron =

Destron may refer to:

- Decepticon or Destron, a faction in Transformers
- Destron, a faction from Beast Wars: Transformers; see Beast Wars II: Super Life-Form Transformers
- Destron, a fictional terrorist organization in Kamen Rider V3
