= Cyber Nation Network =

Japanese pop duo

Cyber Nation Network サイバー ネーション ネットワーク
- Origin: Japan
- Genres: J-pop, electropop, funk
- Years active: 1997–2000
- Labels: Nippon Columbia
- Past members: Sister MAYO; Professor H
- Website: Official Site

Cyber Nation Network (サイバー ネーション ネットワーク, Saibā nēshon nettowāku), abbreviated as C.N.N, is a Japanese pop duo that debuted in 1997 with their single The Power of Love, that was used as an opening theme of the anime Master of Mosquiton and followed by Good Vibration also used as a second opening theme in the series.

== Members ==
- Akihiko Hirama (平間あきひこ, Hirama Akihiko) as Professor H – Producer
- Masayo Sawada (沢田雅世, Sawada Masayo) as Sister MAYO – Vocals

== Discography ==
=== Singles ===
List of singles, with selected chart positions
| Title | Single information | Oricon |
| Title | Single information | Peak position |
|---|---|---|
| "The Power of Love"; As Cyber Nation Network; Opening song for Master Mosquiton '99 | Released: October 21, 1997; Label: Nippon Columbia; Catalog No.: CODC-1348 | 94 |
| "Good Vibration"; As Cyber Nation Network; Second opening song for Master Mosquiton '99 | Released: February 21, 1998; Label: Nippon Columbia; Catalog No.: CODC-1433 | |
| "Get My Future"; As Cyber Nation Network; Opening theme song for Beast Wars II: Super Life-Form Transformers | Released: May 21, 1998; Label: Nippon Columbia; Catalog No.: CODC-1510 | |
| "Super Voyager"; As Cyber Nation Network; Second opening theme song for Beast Wars II: Super Life-Form Transformers | Released: October 31, 1998; Label: Nippon Columbia; Catalog No.: CODC-1659 | |
| Colorful (カラフル); As Cyber Nation Network; Second ending theme song for We Know You, Moonlight Mask-kun! | Released: January 21, 2000; Label: Nippon Columbia; Catalog No.: CODC-1825 | |

=== Albums ===
List of albums, with selected chart positions
| Title | Album information | Oricon |
| Title | Album information | Peak position |
|---|---|---|
| Cyber Nation Network Best 10 Years After | Released: August 22, 2007; Label: Columbia Records; Catalog No.: COCX-34455 | |
