= Ryuji Goda =

Fictional character from the Yakuza series

- Yakuza / Like a Dragon character
- Ryuji Goda as he appears in Yakuza Kiwami 2 (2017)
- First game: Yakuza 2 (2006)
- Voiced by: Masami Iwasaki
- Portrayed by: Sho Jinnai (Ryu ga Gotoku stage play)

In-universe information
- Nationality: Korean Japanese

Ryuji Goda (Japanese: 郷田 龍司, Hepburn: Gōda Ryūji) is a fictional character from Sega's action-adventure game Like a Dragon series, previously known as Yakuza outside of Japan, first appearing in 2006's Yakuza 2. Goda also appears as one of the main characters in a spin-off title of the series, Yakuza: Dead Souls, which does not follow the series' canon and is set in an alternate timeline where Goda survives his wounds at the end of Yakuza 2. Goda is voiced by Masami Iwasaki in all media.

Within the series, Goda is the patriarch of the Go-Ryu Clan, an organized crime yakuza group that is a subsidiary of the Omi Alliance, the dominant yakuza association based in Osaka. Ryuji is the adopted son of Jin Goda, chairman of the Omi Alliance, and is often referred to as the "Dragon of Kansai" (関西の龍, Kansai no Ryū) due to the tattoo of a golden yellow dragon on his back. He expressed dissatisfaction towards the sobriquet however, as he believes that there could only be "one true dragon" in Japan. To this end, his primary motivation in Yakuza 2 is to defeat series protagonist Kazuma Kiryu, the "Dragon of Dojima", who is presented as his premier rival.

Goda has received a positive reception. The character's popularity in Japan has seen the character being periodically re-introduced into the franchise in spite of his death in Yakuza 2 and its 2017 remake, Yakuza Kiwami 2. Many reviewers called Goda the best villain of the franchise and consider the character's depiction in Yakuza 2 and its remake to be a series highlight.

== Creation and development ==
Goda's concept as a character originated from the developers' desire to create an overwhelmingly powerful antagonist that makes players think that they may not be able to win in terms of raw power, strength, and organizational strength. His personality has been described by the head writer of ONLINE Kazunobu Takeuchi as arrogant and violent, as well as an enigma as he is the type of person who does not really disclose his true feelings. In his first appearance, Goda carries a Japanese sword which he occasionally uses as a weapon, and is known for his dragon tattoo; the series' developers have used tattoos to provide characterization or highlight the relationship between friends or enemies throughout the franchise, and are designed by Kazuaki Kitamura, a Japanese tattoo artist better known as Horitomo. The character is redesigned for Dead Souls, where his right arm has been replaced by metal prosthetic, and is later outfitted with a portable gatling gun. The segment of ONLINE which details Goda's life before he became the leader of the Go-Ryu Clan was released in March 2020.

The character's popularity with the franchise's Japanese fanbase has encouraged the developers to present Goda in recurring appearances well after his canonical demise during the events of Yakuza 2. When Goda was announced as the fourth and final playable character for Dead Souls on August 18, 2010, Yakuza producer Toshihiro Nagoshi acknowledged the demand for further appearances for the character, noting his "manly, brawny" appeal as a "rival character who gives off a powerful aura" and that his story arc would follow the events of Yakuza 2. At the 2019 Tokyo Game Show, Goda's actor Iwasaki stated in a Q&A session that he rarely gets to play the characters he wants to play in the voice acting industry, but he managed to land the role of Ryuji Goda whom he really wanted to play after having auditioned for it, and is thus very fond of the character.

In an interview conducted by 4gamer staff with Renji Ishibashi, the voice actor of an elderly takoyaki cook who takes in Goda as an apprentice and serves as his father figure in Dead Souls, he explained that Goda's arc explores how he deals with the conflicting identities of his past and present, as a former criminal who now carries on a legitimate trade as a tradesperson, and what kind of future would he end up with. Ishibashi said one of the most important things taught by Goda's mentor, who is only ever referred to as "Oyassan" (おやっさん, an honorific title for "father") and knows more than what he lets on about Goda's history, is how to dispatch a live octopus in one blow. He opined that it may seem cruel at first, but suggested that one's opponent would needlessly suffer if they are not finished off in the most efficient manner possible, and that what Goda learns from his master is in fact an act of compassion. Ishibashi suggested that while Goda during his youth is not the same violent crime boss he eventually becomes, a part of his nature embraced the gangster role because it felt right, noting that the events of the game tests Goda's resolve and reveals his inner conflict as he is pulled back into the criminal underworld which he no longer wants to be involved in. He considered Goda's relationship with his mentor as a character study of two men who are both trying to move on from a difficult past and the highlight of Goda's story arc, being an example of a positive bond between men in spite of its sad conclusion.

On the developers' decision to shift the narrative of ONLINE away from current series protagonist Ichiban Kasuga to Goda as of March 2020, Takeuchi explained in an interview with Famitsu that he wanted to explore the story of a protagonist who is very different in temperament, and who is so strong he could effortlessly plough through his enemies. While other characters such as Shun Akiyama and Yoshitaka Mine were considered as candidates to succeed Kasuga, Takeuchi ultimately decided on Goda as he is a fan favorite whom he already has ideas for, and that the previous ONLINE sub story event involving the character was very well received, noting that the game itself was conceived as a form of fan service for longtime fans who might want to see more of Goda's adventures. At a panel event for ONLINE at the Tokyo Game Show 2019, panel members drew attention to the character's enduring popularity and his status as Kiryu's most impressive rival in the series as the reason for his renewed prominence, and noted that there are further opportunities to explore the character's backstory as he has not been featured much in franchise media outside of Dead Souls.

== Appearances ==
=== Yakuza 2 / Yakuza Kiwami 2 ===
In Yakuza 2, Goda's initial introduction sees him conspiring with a gangster over the telephone to create chaos in Kamurochō (神室町), a fictionalized version of the real life Kabukichō district in Shinjuku, Tokyo. Kiryu encounters Goda for the first time in a cabaret establishment at Sōtenbori (蒼天堀), based on Osaka's real-life Dōtonbori entertainment district, where he is drinking with his henchmen, and later lashes out and assaults one of them after he calls Goda the "Dragon of Kansai". Goda stages a coup when Kiryu meets his father Jin Goda at the Omi Alliance headquarters and attempts to broker a peace deal, and kidnaps his father and Daigo Dojima, wanting to start a war between the Tojo Clan and Omi Alliance.

It is later revealed that Goda is the son of the Jingweon boss and his wife Suyeon, and that Kaoru is his half-sister. He wants revenge against Tojo Clan for the massacre of the Jingweon 26 years ago; to accomplish this, he collaborates with the Jingweon to destroy the Tojo and the city they operate in, though later states he hates associating with the Jingweon and has no interest in their agenda. At the end of the game, Kiryu and Goda fight on the top of the unfinished Kamurocho Hills. After his defeat, and the killing of Jin and Terada, he gets up and charges Takashima with a gun. Goda is shot multiple times before finally shooting Takashima in the head. He and Kiryu then have a final showdown, explaining to the protesting Sayama that both he and Kiryu are going to die anyway, either by succumbing to their wounds or the bomb exploding, which ends with a cross-counter. He then dies in Kaoru's arms.

=== Other appearances ===
In the zombie-oriented spinoff Yakuza: Dead Souls, which follows an alternate timeline, Goda has been expelled from the Omi Alliance after losing his fight with Kiryu, and drifts around before settling down at a takoyaki shop as an apprentice to its cantankerous owner. He was set to succeed the owner as proprietor of the business, before returning to Kamurocho during the zombie outbreak, and discovers that the Omi Alliance is involved with the outbreak's origins.

An adolescent Goda makes a brief appearance in Yakuza 0, which takes place 18 years prior to the events of Yakuza 2, as part of an optional sub story encounter with protagonist Goro Majima, where he starts fights with high school students and steals their pants as the "Bontan Hunter". Goda would also briefly run into Kiryu later on in another sub story, right after a fortune teller tells the latter that he will run into a young man whose fate would be entangled with his, foreshadowing the events of Yakuza 2.

In Yakuza Kiwami 2, Goda makes an appearance in the "Majima Saga" side story, where he is impressed by Majima's integrity after he announced the disbandment of the Majima Family as atonement to appease the strained relations between the Tojo Clan and the Omi Alliance.

In 2020, Goda is featured as the central character of a prequel story arc in the mobile title Ryu ga Gotoku ONLINE (Note: Also referred to as Yakuza ONLINE by non-Japanese media) (龍が如く ONLINE, lit. "Like a Dragon ONLINE"), a freemium collectible card game spin-off exclusive to Japan.

Goda is mentioned in the 2023 title Like a Dragon Gaiden: The Man Who Erased His Name, in which Goda's battle with Kiryu is recreated as part of a battle coliseum event. A substory mission also involves Kiryu hunting down a revived Go-Ryu Clan, which hired various fake Goda to spread the rumor of his survival and return. As part of the Coliseum activity, players can also hire a fighter named Li'l Ryuji Goda, who is another lookalike that bears striking resemblance to the real Goda.

== In other media ==
Ryuji Goda is portrayed by D2 band member Sho Jinnai for the stage play adaptation of the first Yakuza game. Directed by Takahiro Tamura, the stage play ran with eight performances from April 24 to April 29, 2015, at the Akasaka ACT Theater in Akasaka, Minato Ward in Tokyo, Japan. Goda's inclusion in the play's narrative was not an adaptation of any existing game media as the character does not appear in the first game or its remake; notable original content from the play included a confrontation scene between Goda and Akira Nishikiyama.

Goda appears as a bonus character in Binary Domain, and in the PSP game Taiko no Tatsujin Portable DX series alongside other Yakuza series protagonists as part of a crossover event.

The spin-off title Ryu ga Gotoku Ishin! and its remake Like a Dragon: Ishin feature Saigo Kichinosuke, the commander of the Satsuma domain's army, whose in-game avatar is identical in appearance to Goda.

== Reception ==
Ryuji Goda has been very positively received, both as a charismatic villain which contrasts Kiryu's more reserved spirit, and for his character development in the spin-off sequel Dead Souls. Kotaku's Heather Alexandra described him as the glue that binds the disparate elements of Kiwami 2 together. They formed the view that the final battle between Goda and Kiryu is among the series’ finest moments. Jonathan Logan from RPGFan called Goda "a dark reflection of Kiryu", who possesses "layers of complexity and emotional depth that most villains lack", noting that his commanding presence sets the ideal standard for villains in the Yakuza series. Kelly Pask from PCGamesN consider Goda a highlight of the series, an unpredictable villain who relishes in causing chaos and violence for the sake of it, and said that "it feels like a make or break moment for Kiryu’s character" when they finally collide. Liana Ruppert from Game Informer said that Goda's immense honor and fierce loyalty are his real redeeming qualities, and praised Masami Iwasaki's voice work as inimitable for imparting a sense of gravitas to Goda's characterization. Phil Kollar, also from Game Informer, found Goda's motivation for hunting down undead monsters in Dead Souls as an act of honor and reconciliation interesting, since he had a hand in their creation. Chris Schilling from Eurogamer commented that the depiction of Goda running a takoyaki stall in Dead Souls is an occasion where the series "treats something ridiculous in such an earnest manner that it's impossible not to warm to it".

Conversely, Peter Glagowski from Destructoid said that Kiwami 2 tries to build up Goda as a menacing villain with an interesting backstory, but paradoxically does not afford him adequate screen time; as a result, he found the character to be unconvincing as an "ultimate threat" to Kiryu. Hayden Dingman from PCWorld agreed that Goda is underutilized, but is nevertheless a fantastic foil to Kiryu.

In a 2013 popularity poll, held on the franchise's official website between July 9 to August 8, 2013, Goda was voted the 9th most popular character. In a 2018 poll organized to promote ONLINE, Goda was voted the 6th most popular character.

== Promotion and merchandise ==
Goda has been subject to various promotional campaigns and merchandise, which often features his signature golden yellow dragon tattoo as a motif or theme. Following the announcement of Goda as the fourth and final playable character for Dead Souls, a large poster of him was erected across the east exits of the Shinjuku branch of Don Quijote, a shop that is featured throughout the series as a tie-in.

To promote the Japanese launch of Kiwami 2 for PlayStation 4, in late-2017 series publisher SEGA collaborated with food delivery website Takumen.com to offer character-themed ramen dishes for delivery orders and at select ramen noodle eateries for a limited time period. One of the dishes is a variant of the miso ramen inspired by Goda: the ramen's chashu topping is prepared to resemble Goda's yellow dragon motif in appearance, while the spicy flavour and foamy texture of the ramen broth is supposed to evoke his personality.
