= Sister Mayo =

Japanese singer

Sister MAYO
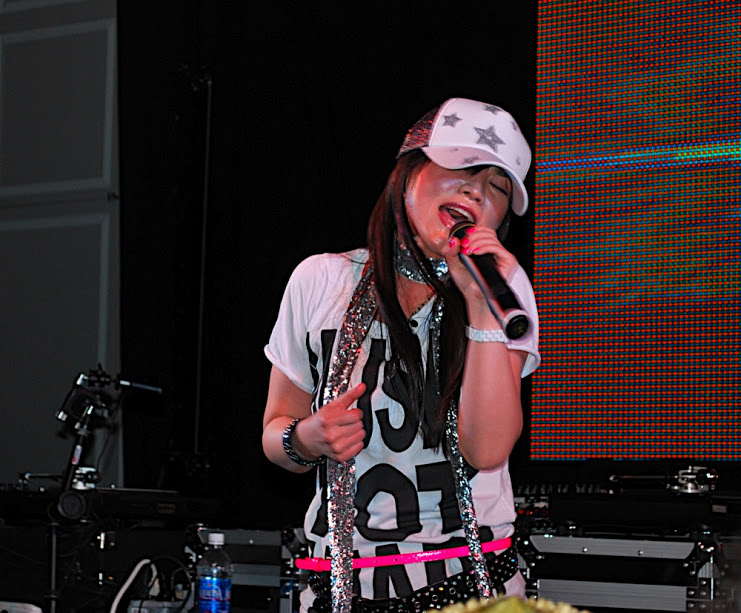
- Sawada performing in Maryland, U.S

Background information
- Born: Sawada Masayo (澤田 雅世); July 26, 1974 (age 52); Ichikawa, Chiba, Japan
- Genres: Japanese pop, electropop, anison
- Occupation: Singer
- Instrument: Vocals
- Years active: 1997–present
- Label: Nippon Columbia / Columbia Music Entertainment
- Website: sistermayo.kill.jp

Masayo Sawada (澤田 雅世, Sawada Masayo), (born July 26, 1974) better known by her stagename Sister MAYO, is a Japanese singer. She is a member of the Columbia Music Entertainment duo Cyber Nation Network, and a vocalist in Project.R which performs many theme songs for the Super Sentai series, some have reached the top ten in Oricon's charts. Her best-known songs as a soloist have been the opening theme of Haré+Guu and the ending theme of Mahou Sentai Magiranger. She is the younger sister of heavy metal musician Taiji, with whom she was in the rock band Otokaze.

After attending vocational school, she got a job at a travel agency. After suffering from a herniated disc, she decided to pursue her dream of being a musician. She released her first single in 1997 under her own name. A producer gave her her stage name when she joined Cyber Nation Network.

In appearances, she generally wears a baseball cap. Prior to the release of "Jumon Kōrin ~ Magical Force" (呪文降臨～マジカル・フォース, Jumon Kōrin ~ Majikaru Fōsu; "The Spell Advent ~ Magical Force"), she also wore glasses, out of shyness. Nippon Columbia asked her to take off one or the other, and she decided to keep the cap.

In 2020, she started the unit Rainbow☆MAG!C with Hideyuki Takahashi and Natsuo.

== Discography ==
=== Singles ===
List of singles, with selected chart positions
Title	Single information	Oricon
Title	Single information	Peak position
"Legend of Blizzard"; As Masayo Sawada with B-Club Band; Theme song for Queens Road video game	Released: January 21, 1997; Label: Angel; Catalog No.: APDM-5042	
Love Tropicana (LOVE♡トロピカーナ, Rabu Toropikāna); As Sister MAYO; Opening theme song for Hare+Guu	Released: May 19, 2001; Label: Nippon Columbia; Catalog No.: CODC-1970; Also LOVE Tropicana Deluxe (LOVE☆トロピカ～ナ・デラックス, Rabu Toropikāna Derakkusu) released August 21, 2002; Also LOVE Tropicana Final (LOVE☆トロピカーナ・ファイナル, Rabu Toropikāna Fainaru) released January 21, 2004	108 (Final)
"Jumon Kōrin ~ Magical Force" (呪文降臨～マジカル・フォース, Jumon Kōrin ~ Majikaru Fōsu; "The Spell Advent ~ Magical Force"); As Sister MAYO; Ending theme song for Mahou Sentai Magiranger	B-side track of "Mahou Sentai Magiranger" single by Takafumi Iwasaki & Sister Mayo; Released: March 2, 2005; Label: Columbia Music Entertainment; Catalog No.: COCC-15741	
"Patta Potta Monta" (パッタポッタモン太); As Sister MAYO; Theme song for Patta Potta Monta (ja:パッタポッタモン太)	Released: September 20, 2006; Label: Columbia Music Entertainment; Catalog No.: COCC-15934	
"Pururun! Shizuku-Chan" (ぷるるんっ！しずくちゃん, Pururun! Shizukachan); As Sister MAYO with D.D.S. Theme song for Shizuku-chan anime television series.	Released: November 22, 2006; Label: Columbia Music Entertainment; Catalog No.: COCC-15945	

=== Albums ===
List of singles, with selected chart positions
Title	Album information	Oricon
Title	Album information	Peak position
Otokaze (音風) by Otokaze	Sung on tracks 1, 2, 3, and 8; Released: Label: Catalog No.: R-04A0052TO	
Sister MAYO Best Album: Sister Mayo No. 1 (Sister MAYOベストアルバム『Sister MAYO 1号』, Shisutā MAYO besuto arubamu "shisutā MAYO 1-gō")	Released: July 2, 2010; Label: Columbia Music Entertainment; Catalog No.: COCX-36248	

== Personal life ==
Sister MAYO is the younger sister of Taiji Sawada, who was a bassist for X Japan and various other groups. Taiji died on July 17, 2011.
