= Osu! Karate Club =

Japanese manga series

- First tankōbon volume cover

押忍!!空手部 (Osu!! Karate-bu)
- Manga
- Written by: Koji Takahashi
- Published by: Shueisha
- English publisher: Beaglee
- Imprint: Young Jump Comics Special
- Magazine: Weekly Young Jump
- Original run: 1985 – 1996
- Volumes: 43
- Live-action film
- Directed by: Tōru Murakawa
- Written by: Yuichi Higurashi
- Music by: Tōru Hasebe
- Studio: Excellent Creative; Shochiku
- Released: March 17, 1990
- Runtime: 96 minutes
- Original video animation
- Directed by: Osamu Sekita
- Written by: Hideo Nanbu
- Music by: Akira Yamazaki
- Studio: J.C. Staff
- Released: October 1, 1990 – July 25, 1992
- Runtime: 50 minutes
- Episodes: 4
- icon

Osu! Karate Club (Japanese: 押忍!!空手部, Hepburn: Osu!! Karate-bu) is a Japanese manga series written and illustrated by Koji Takahashi. It was serialized in Shueisha's seinen manga magazine Weekly Young Jump from 1985 to 1996, with its chapters collected in 43 tankōbon volumes. A live action film adaptation premiered in March 1990. A four-episode original video animation (OVA) adaptation by J.C. Staff was released from 1990 to 1992.

== Media ==
=== Manga ===
Written and illustrated by Koji Takahashi, Osu! Karate Club was serialized in Shueisha's seinen manga magazine Weekly Young Jump from 1985 to 1996. Shueisha collected its chapters in 43 tankōbon volumes, released from June 1986 to May 1996.

The manga was published digitally in English by Beaglee from September 16, 2017, to June 11, 2019.

Another manga, titled Osu! Mahjong Club (押忍!!麻雀部, Osu!! Mājan-bu), was first published in two-parts in Takeshobo's Kindai Mahjong Original on April 8 and May 8, 2013, and due to its popularity, it was later serialized in Kindai Mahjong starting on July 15 of that same year. Two tankōbon volumes were released on November 27, 2013, and April 26, 2014.

=== Live action film ===
A live action film adaptation, directed by Tōru Murakawa, produced by Excellent Creative and distributed by Shochiku, premiered in Japan on March 17, 1990.

=== Original video animation ===
A four-episode original video animation (OVA) adaptation, animated by J.C.Staff and directed by Osamu Sekita, was released from October 1, 1990, to July 25, 1992.

=== Video game ===
A video game was released by Culture Brain for the Super Famicom on August 26, 1994.
