= Osamu Sekita =

Japanese anime director (died 2019)

- Born: 関田 修
- Died: April 11, 2019
- Occupations: Anime director, storyboard artist

Osamu Sekita (関田 修, Sekita Osamu) was a Japanese anime director and storyboard artist. He was known for directing series such as Beast Wars II, Beast Wars Neo, Cross Game, Strawberry 100%, and Transformers: Robots in Disguise, as well as the OVA series Osu!! Karate Bu, Shin Captain Tsubasa, and U-Jin Brand.

Sekita was a member of Dream Force and had worked on Hal Film Maker and Synergy SP productions. He was also a member of the former Junio Brain Trust.

== Works ==
=== TV animation ===
- Shin Don Chuck Monogatari (1976–1978, episode director)
- Kagaku Bōkentai Dancer 5 (1979–1980, episode director)
- Mobile Suit Gundam (1979–1980, episode director)
- The Ultraman (1979–1980, episode director, storyboards)
- Zenderman (1979–1980, episode director)
- Space Runaway Ideon (1980–1981, episode director)
- The New Adventures of Gigantor (1980–1981, episode director)
- Superbook (1981–1982, episode director)
- Fang of the Sun Dougram (1981–1983, episode director)
- Urusei Yatsura (1981–1986, episode director, storyboards)
- Asari-chan (1982–1983, episode director)
- Combat Mecha Xabungle (1982–1983, episode director, storyboards)
- Aura Battler Dunbine (1983–1984, episode director, storyboards)
- Ginga Hyōryū Vifam (1983–1984, episode director)
- Plawres Sanshiro (1982–1984, episode director)
- Chōriki Robo Galatt (1984–1985, episode director, storyboards)
- Heavy Metal L-Gaim (1984–1985, episode director, storyboards)
- Mobile Suit Zeta Gundam (1985–1986, episode director, storyboards)
- Metal Armor Dragonar (1987–1988, episode director)
- Mobile Suit Gundam ZZ (1986–1987, episode director, storyboards)
- Maison Ikkoku (1986–1988, episode director)
- Yoroiden Samurai Troopers (1988–1989, episode director, storyboards)
- Jushin Liger (1989–1990, episode director)
- The Brave Fighter of Legend Da-Garn (1992–1993, episode director, storyboards)
- The Brave Express Might Gaine (1993–1994, episode director)
- Mobile Suit Victory Gundam (1993–1994, episode director)
- Yaiba (1993–1994, episode director)
- Saber Marionette J (1996–1997, episode director)
- Hakugei: Legend of the Moby Dick (1997–1999, episode director)
- Beast Wars II (1998–1999, series director, storyboards)
- Beast Wars Neo (1999, series director, episode director, storyboards)
- Transformers: Robots in Disguise (2000, series director, episode director, storyboards)
- Chobits (2002, episode director)
- Pita-Ten (2002, episode director)
- GetBackers (2002–2003, episode director)
- Mobile Suit Gundam SEED (2002–2003, episode director)
- Princess Tutu (2002–2003, episode director)
- Bakuten Shoot: Beyblade G Revolution (2003, episode director)
- Scrapped Princess (2003, episode director)
- W Wish (2004–2005, series director, episode director, storyboards)
- Sgt. Frog (since 2004, episode director)
- Strawberry 100% (2005, series director, episode director, storyboards)
- The Law of Ueki (2005–2006, episode director)
- Crash B-Daman (2006, episode director)
- Higurashi no Naku Koro ni (2006, episode director)
- Strain: Strategic Armored Infantry (2006–2007, episode director)
- Hero Tales (2007–2008, series director, episode director, storyboards)
- Porphy no Nagai Tabi (2008, episode director)
- Zettai Karen Children (2008–2009, episode director)
- Cross Game (2009–2010, series director, episode director, storyboards)

=== OVAs ===
- Heavy Metal L-Gaim (1986–1987, episode director, storyboards)
- Dirty Pair (1987–1988, episode director)
- Twin (1989, director)
- Shin Captain Tsubasa (1989–1990, series director)
- Osu! Karate Club (1990–1992, series director)
- Kumo in Noru (1991, director)
- Maji! Risshi-hen (1991, director)
- U-Jin Brand (1991, director)
- Utchare Gosho Kawara (1991, director)
- Yokohama Meibutsu: Otoko Katayama-gumi (1991, supervising director)
- Don: Gokudō Suikoden (1992, director)
- Princess Army: Wedding Combat (1992, director)
- Gorillaman (1992–1993, director)
- My My Mai (1993–1994, director)
- Bad Boys (1993–1998, episode director)
- Fencer of Minerva (1994, episode director)
- Homeroom Affairs (1994, director)
- Shonan Junai Gumi! 5: Last Signal (1997, director)
- Moeyo Ken (2003–2004, episode director, storyboards)
- Ghost Talker's Daydream (2004, series director, episode director, storyboards)

=== Films ===
- Mobile Suit SD Gundam (1988, director)
