= Seven Shakespeares =

Japanese manga series

- First tankōbon volume cover

7人のシェイクスピア (Nana-nin no Sheikusupia)
- Genre: Drama; Historical
- Manga
- Written by: Harold Sakuishi
- Published by: Shogakukan (former); Kodansha (current)
- English publisher: NA: Kodansha USA (digital)
- Magazine: Weekly Big Comic Spirits
- Original run: December 21, 2009 – November 14, 2011
- Volumes: 6 (Shogakukan); 3 (Kodansha)
- Manga

Seven Shakespeares: Non Sanz Droict
- Written by: Harold Sakuishi
- Published by: Kodansha
- English publisher: NA: Kodansha USA (digital)
- Magazine: Weekly Young Magazine
- Original run: December 12, 2016 – present
- Volumes: 13
- icon

Seven Shakespeares (Japanese: 7人のシェイクスピア, Hepburn: Nana-nin no Sheikusupia) is a Japanese manga series written and illustrated by Harold Sakuishi. It was serialized in Shogakukan's seinen manga magazine Weekly Big Comic Spirits from December 2009 to November 2011, with its chapters collected in six tankōbon volumes. A sequel, titled Seven Shakespeares: Non Sanz Droict, started in Kodansha's Weekly Young Magazine in December 2016.

== Plot ==
The series is centered around William Shakespeare's "lost years" before becoming a playwright and poet.

== Publication ==
Written and illustrated by Harold Sakuishi, Seven Shakespeares was serialized in Shogakukan's Weekly Big Comic Spirits from December 21, 2009, to November 14, 2011. Shogakukan collected its chapters in six tankōbon volumes, released from May 28, 2010, to December 28, 2011. Kodansha republished the series in three volumes, released from July 6 to September 6, 2017.

A sequel, titled Seven Shakespeares: Non Sanz Droict (7人のシェイクスピア NON SANZ DROICT), started in Kodansha's Weekly Young Magazine on December 12, 2016. In April 2020, Sakuishi announced that the series would enter an indefinite hiatus. Kodansha has collected its chapters into individual tankōbon volumes. The first volume was released on April 6, 2017. As of August 5, 2020, thirteen volumes have been released.

In North America, the series is published digitally in English by Comixology and Kodansha USA since July 2018.

=== Seven Shakespeares ===
No.	Original release date	Original ISBN	English release date	English ISBN
1	May 28, 2010	978-4-09-183235-1	March 3, 2020	978-1-64212-257-2
2	September 30, 2010	978-4-09-183578-9	March 3, 2020	978-1-64212-257-2
3	January 28, 2011	978-4-09-183740-0	March 3, 2020	978-1-64212-258-9
4	May 30, 2011	978-4-09-183873-5	March 3, 2020	978-1-64212-258-9
5	October 28, 2011	978-4-09-184215-2	March 3, 2020	978-1-64212-259-6
6	December 28, 2011	978-4-09-184244-2	March 3, 2020	978-1-64212-259-6

=== Seven Shakespeares: Non Sanz Droict ===
No.	Original release date	Original ISBN	English release date	English ISBN
1	April 6, 2017	978-4-06-382954-9	March 3, 2020	978-1-64212-260-2
2	July 6, 2017	978-4-06-510017-2	March 3, 2020	978-1-64212-380-7
3	November 6, 2017	978-4-06-510311-1	March 3, 2020	978-1-64212-381-4
4	March 6, 2018	978-4-06-511038-6	March 3, 2020	978-1-64212-382-1
5	June 6, 2018	978-4-06-511682-1	March 3, 2020	978-1-64212-581-8
6	September 6, 2018	978-4-06-512813-8	March 3, 2020	978-1-64212-582-5
7	December 6, 2018	978-4-06-513846-5	March 3, 2020	978-1-64212-803-1
8	April 5, 2019	978-4-06-515196-9	March 3, 2020	978-1-64212-962-5
9	July 5, 2019	978-4-06-516357-3	March 3, 2020	978-1-64659-110-7
10	November 6, 2019	978-4-06-517735-8	September 29, 2020	978-1-64659-717-8
11	February 6, 2020	978-4-06-518483-7	December 8, 2020	978-1-64659-858-8
12	May 7, 2020	978-4-06-519554-3	March 9, 2021	978-1-64659-999-8
13	August 5, 2020	978-4-06-519995-4	June 29, 2021	978-1-63699-168-9
