= Gorillaman =

Japanese manga series

- First tankōbon volume cover

ゴリラーマン (Gorirāman)
- Genre: Comedy
- Manga
- Written by: Harold Sakuishi
- Published by: Kodansha
- Magazine: Weekly Young Magazine
- Original run: 1988 – 1993
- Volumes: 19
- Original video animation
- Directed by: Yoshinori Nakamura (1); Osamu Sekita (2)
- Written by: Jou Hirose
- Studio: J.C.Staff
- Released: June 25, 1992 – December 24, 1993
- Runtime: 46 minutes (each)
- Episodes: 2
- Manga

Gorillaman 40; Gorillaman 40: Family Arc
- Written by: Harold Sakuishi
- Published by: Kodansha
- Magazine: Weekly Young Magazine
- Original run: October 12, 2020 – May 13, 2024
- Volumes: 5
- icon

Gorillaman (Japanese: ゴリラーマン, Hepburn: Gorirāman) is a Japanese manga series written and illustrated by Harold Sakuishi. It was serialized in Kodansha's seinen manga magazine Weekly Young Magazine from 1988 to 1993, with its chapters collected in 19 tankōbon volumes. It was adapted into a two-episode original video animation (OVA) animated by J.C.Staff in 1992. A sequel, titled Gorillaman 40, was serialized in Weekly Young Magazine from 2020 to 2022. A spin-off, titled Gorillaman 40: Family Arc, was serialized in the same magazine from 2023 to 2024.

Gorillaman won the 14th Kodansha Manga Award in the general category in 1990. It has sold 12 million copies.

== Production ==
19-year-old Harold Sakuishi created his debut work Gorillaman from thinking about what would happen if someone like Golgo 13 lived in a school. He had previously spent a lot of time drawing and inking a manga while following the instructions of his editor, but it was still rejected. Annoyed, he spent months playing Bases Loaded before deciding to believe in himself and draw the manga that he wanted to draw, and said that, if Gorillaman did not work out, he would give up on being a manga artist.

The title character's gorilla-like appearance was inspired by a real-life classmate of Sakuishi. He initially planned for the character to just be quiet, but during a meeting, his editor suggested having him not say anything at all and the artist found it interesting. When Sakuishi initially proposed having Gorillaman speak in the final chapter, his editor opposed the idea. But after conducting a survey of the editorial staff, the majority thought it would be more interesting if he spoke, so they went with it.

== Media ==
=== Manga ===
Written and illustrated by Harold Sakuishi, Gorillaman was serialized in Kodansha's seinen manga magazine Weekly Young Magazine from 1988 to 1993. Kodansha collected its chapters in nineteen tankōbon volumes, released from April 6, 1989, to October 6, 1993.

For the magazine's 40th anniversary, Sakuishi launched a two-chapter story in Weekly Young Magazine, under the title Gorillaman 40, on October 12 and 17, 2020; it was later serialized in the same magazine from March 28 to August 22, 2022. A spin-off manga, titled Gorillaman 40: Family Arc (ゴリラーマン40 ファミリー編, Gorirāman 40 Famirī-hen), was first published as a one-shot in Weekly Young Magazine on October 3, 2022, and was later serialized in the same magazine from December 25, 2023, to May 13, 2024.

Kodansha collected the Gorillaman 40 chapters in three tankōbon volumes, released from April 6 to September 6, 2022; a fourth volume, including the first six chapters of Gorillaman 40: Family Arc, was released on April 5, 2024, and the fifth volume was released on July 5 of the same year.

=== Original video animation ===
The series was adapted into a two-episode original video animation (OVA) animated by J.C.Staff, released on June 25, 1992, and December 24, 1993.

=== Video game ===
A video game, titled The Gorilla Man, was released on April 28, 1993, for the Nintendo Famicom by Yonezawa PR21, a publishing label for Yonezawa Toys. The game is one of only a handful of titles to support Yonezawa's Partytap peripheral, a special controller that allows up to six players to play at once.

== Reception ==
In 1990, alongside The Silent Service, Gorillaman won the 14th Kodansha Manga Award in the general category. By 2022, it had sold about 12 million copies.
