= Super Life-Form Transformers: Beast Wars Neo =

Animated series and toy line

- Beast Wars Neo
- Video cover

超生命体トランスフォーマー ビーストウォーズネオ (Chō Seimeitai Toransufōmā: Bīsuto Wōzu Neo)
- Genre: Adventure, mecha
- Anime television series
- Directed by: Osamu Sekita
- Written by: Junki Takegami
- Music by: Yuzo Hayashi
- Studio: Ashi Productions
- Licensed by: Hasbro
- Original network: TXN (TV Tokyo)
- Original run: February 3, 1999 – September 29, 1999
- Episodes: 35
- Manga
- Written by: Shoji Imaki
- Published by: Kodansha
- Imprint: BomBom KC
- Magazine: Comic BomBom
- Original run: March 26, 1999 – October 1999
- Volumes: 1

Super Life-Form Transformers: Beast Wars Neo (超生命体トランスフォーマー ビーストウォーズネオ, Chō Seimeitai Toransufōmā: Bīsuto Wōzu Neo) is a 1999 Japanese animated television series Transformers franchise. It serves as a sequel to the preceding series Beast Wars II. The production of the series involved NAS, TV Tokyo, and Ashi Productions. Hozumi Gōda reprised his role as Lio Convoy from Beast Wars II in this series. Each episode has a runtime of approximately 30 minutes and was broadcast in the standard 4:3 aspect ratio.

== Plot ==
The series centers on the conflict between the Maximal and Predacon factions over the control of mysterious Angolmois Capsules. Big Convoy, a "one-man army," is tasked with teaching a group of young recruits to confront Magmatron's group. As the series progresses, both factions ultimately unite to combat the dark god Unicron and his sub-group, the Blentrons.

== Characters ==
The principal characters from Beast Wars Neo

This is a list of characters from the 1999 anime series Super Life-Form Transformers: Beast Wars Neo. As a direct sequel to Beast Wars II, Beast Wars Neo follows a group of young Maximals, (Note: Referred to as "Cybertrons" in Japan) led by Big Convoy, as they traverse the galaxy to prevent Magmatron's Predacons (Note: Referred to as "Destrons" in Japan) and Unicron's Blentrons from collecting capsules containing Angolmois Energy.

=== Main ===
- Maximals - Descendants of the Autobots.
  - Big Convoy - A warrior known for his immense power and tendency to engage in battles alone, earning him the reputation of a "one-man-army". Despite his preference for solitude, he is tasked by the supercomputer Vector Sigma and the Convoy Council to lead a group of young Maximals on a mission to retrieve the Angolmois Capsules before Magmatron and later Unicron can claim them. Big Convoy can transform into a woolly mammoth and wields the Big Cannon.
  - Longrack - The group's sub-commander who is known for his aggressive strictness and talkative nature. He can transform into a giraffe and is skilled at tinkering with machines. In combat, he can perform the Arm Shot and Crush Arm attacks.
  - Colada - A cold, quick-tempered, and arrogant Maximal who can transform into a cobra. His powers and personality make him favor dry climates.
  - Stampy - A cheerful but cowardly Maximal triple-changer who often frustrates his teammates. He can transform into a rabbit and a pair of weaponized scissors. Additionally, he possesses enhanced hearing, speed, and intelligence-gathering abilities.
  - Break - A bold, temperamental, and tidy Maximal who can transform into a penguin. He excels in cold environments, cares deeply for his teammates, and can launch the destructive Break Anchors from his right arm.
  - Heinrad (Note: Sometimes mistranslated as "Heinlad") - An easy-going and sociable yet mischievous and unmotivated Maximal who can transform into a tanuki. He has a clock on his body that allows him to freeze time for 30 seconds, though this drains his energy.
  - Mach Kick - A rowdy and free-spirited Maximal and former second-in-command of the Thoroughbred Corps who can transform into a black horse. He joins Big Convoy's team after losing his original team to the Predacons. Mach Kick admires Big Convoy and often clashes with his friend Longrack. In battle, he can perform the Elastic Hand attack and wields the Tail Tomahawk.
- Predacons - Descendants of the Decepticons.
  - Magmatron - The leader of the Predacons and self-proclaimed "Emperor of Destruction" who seeks the Angolmois Capsules to eradicate all life in the universe. He can split into the following three prehistoric creatures: the Giganotosaurus-esque Landsaurus, the Quetzalcoatlus-esque Skysaurus, and the Elasmosaurus-esque Seasaurus. Additionally, he can recombine into the chimeric Magmasaurus.
  - Guiledart - Magmatron's ambitious right hand, tactician, and engineer who supports reason. He can transform into a Triceratops, perform the Thunder Horn Blast attack, and wields the Tail Shooter gun.
  - Saberback - A mysterious, crafty, and dishonest Predacon who enjoys tormenting Sling. He can transform into a Stegosaurus and wields the Triple Claw talons, which can fire lasers when fully powered.
  - Sling - A cowardly and immature Predacon who often complains when he is belittled by the other Predacons. He can transform into a Dimetrodon, disguise himself as a flower, and wields the Tail Bunker and Sling Shield.
  - Dead End - A cool-headed, solitary, and cruel Predacon soldier who can transform into an ammonite. He can perform the Spiral Bomb attack and wields the Dead Gun in battle.
  - Archadis - A cunning, vain, talkative, and snobbish Predacon who can transform into an Archaeopteryx. In combat, he wields the Wing Gundreads fully automatic cannons, Wing Bombs, and the Founder Shot.

=== Recurring ===
- Navi - The Maximals' navigational computer.
- DNAVI - The Predacons' dragonfly-shaped navigational computer.
- Unicron - A disembodied cosmic entity who seeks to restore his body through Angolmois Energy. After possessing the body of the deceased Predacon commander Galvatron, Unicron commands the chimeric Blentrons to gather the Angolmois Capsules, aiming to transform Cybertron into his new body. Despite nearing success, Unicron is thwarted by Big Convoy and Lio Convoy.
- Blentrons - Transformers created by Unicron, each with a chimeric beast mode, to serve his purposes.
  - Drancron - A Blentron who can transform into an iguana/dragonfly chimera and wields the Drancutter, Clap Missiles, and Lizard Claws.
  - Elphorpha - A brutal Blentron who can transform into a killer whale/elephant chimera; possesses enhanced strength, acid production, and ceiling adhesion; and wields the Killer Tusks and Killer Shooter.
  - Ratorarta - A vicious Blentron who can transform into a lionfish/hornet chimera and wields the Poison Arrow, Dust Hornet, and Lato Thrasher.

=== Guest ===
- Rockbuster - An efficient and pragmatic Maximal vigilante who can transform into a crab. He initially worked with Big Convoy before falling out due to their solitary natures. Following this, Rockbuster operates independently of the Convoy Council. In battle, he utilizes his durable shell for enhanced endurance and wields the Claw Buster and Crush Claw weapons.
- Randy - A dedicated, patient, and honest yet reckless Maximal soldier-for-hire who can transform into a wild boar and wields the Charge Buster.
- Sharp Edge - A dedicated and honorable yet unpredictable Maximal soldier who can transform into a sawshark. He prides himself on his combat abilities and wields the Diamondtail blade.
- Bump - A reserved and solitary Maximal who can transform into a giant armadillo. He possesses enhanced strength, shell-like skin, and a lightning-fast draw-and-fire technique.
- Survive - A Maximal assault commander who can transform into a black bear and utilizes a bat-like reconnaissance scout called True One. He often disagrees with Big Convoy's solitary approach and aims to encourage him to pursue teamwork.
- Killerpunch - A sneaky and deceitful yet gullible Predacon intelligence operative obsessed with laying traps. He can transform into a Styracosaurus and perform the Head Punch attack, which has homing capabilities.
- Hydra - An overly friendly Predacon who seeks companionship and Magmatron's approval. After being stationed at a remote Predacon outpost, he befriended a maid droid and became overprotective of it. He can transform into a Pteranodon and wields the Wing Shot.
- Crazybolt - A duplicitous Predacon escapologist known for rambling. He can transform into a frilled lizard and wields a rifle capable of destroying starships.
- Bazooka - A serious, single-minded, and honorable Predacon who can transform into an Euoplocephalus and perform the Gigaton Stamp attack.
- Hardhead - A simple-minded yet tough Predacon warrior who can transform into a Pachycephalosaurus and wields the Pilesaber blade.
- Lio Convoy - The leader of a Maximal unit who seemingly sacrificed himself to defeat Predacon leader Galvatron and disperse the Angolmois Capsules across the universe in Beast Wars II. Though presumed dead, Lio Convoy was transported back in time, learned of Angolmois Energy's origins, and returned to the present to assist Big Convoy in defeating Unicron.

== Toy line ==
The toy line for Beast Wars Neo includes exclusive figures initially available only in Japan. Some of these figures were later accessible to international fans through the Hasbro online store or were reintroduced in subsequent series, often repainted and remolded. Notably, the Transformers: Universe release of Nemesis Prime was a repaint of Big Convoy by Hasbro. This figure was released in Australia as an exclusive item and as a Target exclusive in the United States. Additionally, it was repainted again for the Ultra Mammoth, a Transformers Collectors Club exclusive figure. Magmatron also became a Target exclusive. Various other figures from the Beast Wars Neo line were introduced in the United States as repaints for different lines.

== Theme songs ==
- Opening
1. "In Order to Protect You" (君を守るために, Kimi o Mamoru Tame ni)
  - Lyricist: Yoshiaki Ochi / Composer: Yoshiaki Ochi / Arranger: Yoshiaki Ochi / Singers: M.C.R.
- Ending
1. "In Hand of Space" (手の中の宇宙, Te no Naka no Uchū)
  - Lyricist: Hitomi Yuki / Composer: Hitomi Yuki / Arranger: Hitomi Yuki / Singers: Hitomi Yuki
- Insert Song
1. "DA DA DA"
  - Lyricist: Yoshiaki Ochi / Composer: Yoshiaki Ochi / Arranger: Yoshiaki Ochi / Singers: M.C.R.

== Episodes ==
No.	Title	Written by	Original release date
1	"Big Convoy, Move Out!" "Biggu Konboi Shutsugeki se yo!" (ビッグコンボイ出撃せよ！？)	Junki Takegami	February 3, 1999
2	"Chase the Mysterious Capsule!" "Nazo no Kapuseru o Oe!" (謎のカプセルを追え！)	Junki Takegami	February 10, 1999
3	"Burning Heart Under The Ice" "Hyō Tenka no Moeru Kokoro" (氷点下の燃える心)	Katsuyuki Sumisawa	February 17, 1999
4	"Go For It! Stampy" "Ganbare! Sutanpī" (頑張れ！スタンピー)	Yukiyoshi Ohashi	February 24, 1999
5	"Mirage of Sand" "Suna no Shinkirō" (砂のしんきろう)	Kazuhiko Godo	March 3, 1999
6	"Dinosaur Combiner Magmatron" "Kyōryū Gattai Magumatoron" (恐竜合体マグマトロン)	Junki Takegami	March 10, 1999
7	"Duel in the Labyrinth" "Meiro no Naka no Kettō" (迷路の中の決闘)	Katsuyuki Sumisawa	March 17, 1999
8	"Black Hole Crisis" "Burakku Hōru no Kiki" (ブラックホールの危機)	Yukiyoshi Ohashi	March 24, 1999
9	"Sub-Commander Longrack" "Fuku Shirei Rongurakku" (副司令ロングラック)	Kazuhiko Godo	March 31, 1999
10	"Wah! Eaten" "Wā! Taberarechatta" (ワー！食べられちゃった)	Yukiyoshi Ohashi	April 7, 1999
11	"Planet of Time" "Toki no Wakusei" (時の惑星)	Kazuhiko Godo	April 14, 1999
12	"Lonely Hydra" "Hitoribotchi no Haidorā" (一人ぼっちのハイドラー)	Katsuyuki Sumisawa	April 21, 1999
13	"Break is Destron?" "Bureiku wa Desutoron?" (ブレイクはデストロン？)	Junki Takegami	April 28, 1999
14	"Voyage Diary" "Kōkai Nisshi" (航海日誌)	Junki Takegami	May 5, 1999
15	"Mach Kick Volunteering Enlistment!?" "Mahha Kikku Nyūtai Shigan!?" (マッハキック入隊志願！？)	Junki Takegami	May 12, 1999
16	"Star of the Ultimate Weapon" "Saikyō Heiki no Hoshi" (最強兵器の星)	Katsuyuki Sumisawa	May 19, 1999
17	"Troubled DNAVI" "Komatta DĪNABI" (困ったDNAVI)	Yukiyoshi Ohashi	May 26, 1999
18	"Assault! Randy" "Totsugeki! Randī" (突撃！ランディー)	Kazuhiko Godo	June 2, 1999
19	"Physicist Bump" "Butsurigakusha Banpu" (物理学者バンプ)	Yukiyoshi Ohashi	June 9, 1999
20	"Hardhead is Hardhead" "Hādoheddo wa Ishiatama" (ハードヘッドは石頭)	Kazuhiko Godo	June 16, 1999
21	"Deepsea Single Combat!!" "Shinkai no Ikki Uchi!!" (深海の一騎討ち！！)	Junki Takegami	June 23, 1999
22	"Stolen Gung Ho" "Ubawareta Gan Hō" (奪われたガンホー)	Katsuyuki Sumisawa	June 30, 1999
23	"Hotblooded Instructor Survive" "Nekketsu Kyōkan Sabaibu" (熱血教官サバイブ)	Yukiyoshi Ohashi	July 7, 1999
24	"Gather! New Warrior Friends" "Atsumare! Shin Senshi Tachi" (集まれ！新戦士達)	Junki Takegami	July 14, 1999
25	"Beast Warrior of Mystery!?" "Nazo no Bīsuto Senshi!?" (謎のビースト戦士！？)	Junki Takegami	July 21, 1999
26	"Robbed Capsule" "Ubawareta Kapuseru" (奪われたカプセル)	Kazuhiko Godo	July 28, 1999
27	"Chase the Blentrons!" "Burentoron o Oe!" (ブレントロンを追え！)	Katsuyuki Sumisawa	August 4, 1999
28	"Angered Magmatron" "Ikari no Magumatoron" (怒りのマグマトロン)	Yukiyoshi Ohashi	August 11, 1999
29	"Illusion? Lio Convoy" "Maboroshi? Raio Konboi" (幻？ライオコンボイ)	Junki Takegami	August 18, 1999
30	"Unicron Resurrection!?" "Yunikuron Fukkatsu!?" (ユニクロン復活！？)	Kazuhiko Godo	August 25, 1999
31	"Unicron's Ambition" "Yunikuron no Yabō" (ユニクロンの野望)	Junki Takegami	September 1, 1999
32	"Fight! Cybertron" "Tatakae! Saibatoron" (戦え！サイバトロン)	Junki Takegami	September 8, 1999
33	"End of Cybertron!?" "Saibatoron no Saigo!?" (サイバトロンの最期！？)	Junki Takegami	September 15, 1999
34	"Last Battle" "Saigo no Tatakai" (最後の戦い)	Junki Takegami	September 22, 1999
35	"Graduation Ceremony!!" "Sotsu Gyōshiki!!" (卒業式！！)	Junki Takegami	September 29, 1999

== Chapters ==
No.	Japanese release date	Japanese ISBN
1	December 3, 1999	978-4-06-334269-7
1st OPERATION: "5 Recruits" (5人の新兵, 5-ri no Shinpei) (March 26, 1999 ISBN 978-4-06-344066-9); 2nd OPERATION: "Targets are 7" (標的は7つ, Hyōteki wa 7-tsu) (May 25, 1999 ISBN 978-4-06-344071-3); 3rd OPERATION: "Apitude 100000000000000000 Grain!!" (敵勢100000000000000000粒！！, Tekisei 100000000000000000 Tsubu!!) (June 29, 1999 ISBN 978-4-06-344077-5); 4th OPERATION: "Deathmatch! 20 Thousand Meter Sky" (死闘！上空2万メートル, Shitō! Jōkū 2 Man Mētoru) (July 27, 1999 ISBN 978-4-06-344088-1); 5th OPERATION: "Lonely Battle" (一人ぼっちの戦い, Hitoribotchi no Tatakai) (August 1999); 6th OPERATION: "Double Trap" (二重の罠, Nijū no wana) (September 1999); LAST OPERATION: "Returning of to Zero" (ゼロへの帰還, Zero he no Kikan) (October 1999)
