= Harold Sakuishi =

Japanese manga artist

- Born: Takahiro Sakuishi 作石貴浩; March 16, 1969 (age 57); Aichi Prefecture, Japan
- Occupation: Manga artist
- Writing career
- Period: 1985–present
- Subject: Manga
- Notable works: Beck; Gorillaman
- Notable awards: Kodansha Manga Award (1990 & 2002)

Takahiro Sakuishi (Japanese: 作石貴浩, Hepburn: Sakuishi Takahiro; born March 16, 1969), better known by the pen name Harold Sakuishi (ハロルド作石, Harorudo Sakuishi), is a Japanese manga artist. Sakuishi's interests include baseball, martial arts and music, each of which has been the basis for some of his manga; baseball in Stopper Busujima, fighting in Bakaichi, and music in Beck and The Band.

== Career ==
Takahiro Sakuishi was born in Aichi Prefecture on March 16, 1969. In 1987, his work Sōwaikan earned him an Excellent Newcomer Award at the 17th Tetsuya Chiba Awards. Sakuishi's first hit was the series Gorillaman, published in Kodansha's Weekly Young Magazine from 1988 to 1993. In 1990, it won the 14th Kodansha Manga Award in the general category.

Sakuishi's baseball manga Stopper Busujima was serialized in Weekly Young Magazine from 1996 to 1998. He then began the music-themed manga Beck in the July 1999 issue of Kodansha's Monthly Shōnen Magazine, and concluded it on June 6, 2008. A special 77-page side-story was published on September 6 of that same year. Beck won Sakuishi the 26th Kodansha Manga Award in the shōnen category in 2002, and is the work he is best known for in the West.

Sakuishi worked with Shogakukan for the first time when he serialized Seven Shakespeares in their magazine Big Comic Spirits from 2009 to 2011.

Sakuishi serialized Rin in Kodansha's Monthly Shōnen Magazine from 2013 to 2016. He then began a sequel to Seven Shakespeares, but with a new publisher in a new magazine; Seven Shakespeares: Non Sanz Droict began in Kodansha's Weekly Young Magazine that December. In 2020, it was announced that the series would be going on indefinite hiatus.

== Works ==
=== Manga ===
- Sōwaikan (そうはいかん; 1987)
- Gorillaman (ゴリラーマン, Gorirāman; 1988–1993)
- Hyenas of the Savannah (サバンナのハイエナ, Sabanna no Haiena; 1994)
- Bakaichi (バカイチ; 1994–1995)
- Stopper Busujima (ストッパー毒島, Sutoppā Busujima; 1996–1998)
- Beck (1999–2008)
- Seven Shakespeares (7人のシェイクスピア, Nana-nin no Sheikusupia; 2009–2011)
- Rin (リン; 2013–2016)
- Seven Shakespeares: Non Sanz Droict (7人のシェイクスピア NON SANZ DROICT; 2016–2020, on indefinite hiatus)
- Gorillaman 40 (ゴリラーマン40; one-shot in 2020; serial in 2022)
- Gorillaman 40: Family Arc (ゴリラーマン40 ファミリー編, Gorirāman 40 Famirī-hen; one-shot in 2022; serial in 2023–2024)
- The Band (2025–present)

=== Other work ===
- Heavy Metal Thunder (2005, character designs)
- Download feat. Hatsune Miku (2014, album cover)
- Upload feat. Vocalist (2014, album cover)

== Awards ==
- 17th Tetsuya Chiba Awards, Excellent Newcomer Award – Sōwaikan (1987)
- 14th Kodansha Manga Award, general category – Gorillaman (1990)
- 26th Kodansha Manga Award, shōnen category – Beck (2002)
- 2018 International Spotlight Award from the Harvey Awards
