= Beck (manga) =

Japanese media franchise based on manga by Harold Sakuishi

- First tankōbon volume cover, featuring Beck (front) and Yukio Tanaka (back)
- Genre: Coming-of-age; Musical drama; Romance
- Manga
- Written by: Harold Sakuishi
- Published by: Kodansha
- English publisher: NA: Kodansha USA
- Magazine: Monthly Shōnen Magazine
- Original run: July 1999 – June 2008
- Volumes: 34
- Anime television series

Beck: Mongolian Chop Squad
- Directed by: Osamu Kobayashi; Mitsuyuki Masuhara (assistant)
- Produced by: Gō Shukuri; Yoshimi Nakajima
- Written by: Osamu Kobayashi
- Studio: Madhouse (Note: Animation production assistance (アニメーション制作協力) for all episodes provided by DR Tokyo.)
- Licensed by: AUS: Madman Entertainment; BI: Anime Limited; NA: Funimation
- Original network: TV Tokyo
- English network: CA: MuchMusic; PH: Hero; US: Funimation Channel
- Original run: October 7, 2004 – March 31, 2005
- Episodes: 26
- Video game

Beck: The Game
- Developer: Sun-Tec
- Publisher: Marvelous Interactive
- Genre: Adventure, Music
- Platform: PlayStation 2
- Released: March 31, 2005
- Live-action film
- Directed by: Yukihiko Tsutsumi
- Written by: Tetsuya Oishi
- Released: September 4, 2010
- Runtime: 145 minutes
- icon

Beck is a Japanese manga series written and illustrated by Harold Sakuishi. It was serialized in Kodansha's shōnen manga magazine Monthly Shōnen Magazine from 1999 to 2008, with its 103 chapters collected in 34 tankōbon volumes. It tells the story of a group of Japanese teenagers who form a rock band and their struggle to fame, focusing on 14-year-old Yukio "Koyuki" Tanaka, who until meeting guitar prodigy Ryusuke Minami was an average teen with a boring life. Beck won the 2002 Kodansha Manga Award in the shōnen category, and has sold over 15 million copies.

It was adapted into a 26-episode anime television series, titled Beck: Mongolian Chop Squad, by Madhouse and aired on TV Tokyo from October 2004 to March 2005. A live-action film adaptation was released in 2010 and stars Takeru Satoh as Koyuki and Hiro Mizushima as Ryusuke. The series has also spawned three guidebooks, four soundtracks, a video game and a line of guitars.

Beck was licensed for an English-language release in North America by Tokyopop. The first volume was published in July 2005, but the series was discontinued after the release of volume 12 in June 2008. ComiXology released the series in English digitally between July 2018 and February 2019. Kodansha USA began publishing the manga in North America in November 2026. The anime adaptation was given an English-language release by Funimation from 2007 to 2008.

== Plot summary ==
Yukio Tanaka, known as "Koyuki" by his friends, is a regular 14-year-old Japanese boy starting eighth grade in junior high school. His boring life is changed when he saves an odd-looking dog, named Beck, from some kids. Beck's owner turns out to be an emerging rock musician, 16-year-old Ryusuke Minami, who soon influences Koyuki to start playing the guitar. The story focuses on the trials and tribulations of their rock band named Beck, and Koyuki's relationships with its members, in particular Ryusuke and his 14-year-old half-sister Maho.

After hanging out with Ryusuke and seeing him play with his former band, Koyuki slowly becomes interested in Western rock music. Ryusuke gives him a guitar, but when Koyuki breaks it, Ryusuke tells him never to speak to him again. At the same time, Ryusuke forms his new band Beck, with vocalist Tsunemi Chiba, bassist Yoshiyuki Taira, and Togo, the drummer from his previous band. Koyuki begins working for, and learning guitar from, 44-year-old Kenichi Saito in exchange to have the guitar fixed.

He reunites with a forgiving Ryusuke a year later, and begins to rehearse with Beck. Koyuki then makes friends with his classmate Yuji "Saku" Sakurai. When Togo leaves the band, Ryusuke has Koyuki and Saku, who plays the drums, join Beck as support musicians, becoming full members only when the band hears Koyuki sing. Eventually Beck releases their first album, which gets released on an independent record label in the United States, under the band name Mongolian Chop Squad. After gaining popularity from their US album and Koyuki being in an internationally screened concert documentary, Beck earns a spot at the music festival Grateful Sound 5, where they put on the most talked about show of the whole festival. (The live-action film adaptation ends here.) However, circumstances cause them to part ways, making it their last performance.

Finding life tedious without being in Beck, Koyuki slowly gets the members back together, except Ryusuke, whose whereabouts are unknown. They perform a few shows as a quartet, before getting an offer to tour the US based on their Grateful Sound 5 performance. After Koyuki and Saku drop out of high school (they were in twelfth grade at this point) to do the tour, Beck heads to America. But after several bad performances, they are about to get kicked off the tour before reuniting with Ryusuke in Seattle. (The anime adaptation ends here.) The rest of the tour is a hit and they end up appearing on national TV before heading back to Japan.

After releasing two singles, Beck goes on a nationwide tour of Japan and earn a spot at Grateful Sound 7. However, they are later cut from the lineup. They slowly bounce back after forming a tour with several similar-sounding bands, get signed to a popular British indie record label, and start recording their first full album. The now-famous director who created the concert documentary Koyuki once appeared in ends up directing their first music video. Their album and music video do well both in Japan and England, earning them numerous magazine articles in both countries. After another nationwide tour of Japan, they do a short tour of England, including a spot at the relaunch of the legendary Avalon Festival. The band then signs to a major international record label and records their major debut album in New York. With the album hugely successful worldwide, they tour Japan and America extensively, and the series then ends with Beck headlining the main stage at Grateful Sound 9.

== Characters ==
Yukio "Koyuki" Tanaka (田中 幸雄, Tanaka Yukio)
Voiced by: Daisuke Namikawa, Kazuya Hirabayashi (singing voice) (Japanese); Greg Ayres (English)
Portrayed by: Takeru Satoh
The series follows his rapid development from living a boring average life to becoming an outstanding guitarist and singer. Before meeting Ryusuke, he only listened to Japanese pop music, having never heard a foreign band before. He is the last member recruited into Beck (along with Saku), playing rhythm guitar and singing slower songs. Throughout the series, Koyuki plays a Fender Telecaster, Gibson SG, Fender Mustang and Gretsch White Falcon at various points.
Ryusuke "Ray" Minami (南 竜介, Minami Ryūsuke)
Voiced by: Yuuma Ueno (Japanese); Eric Vale (English)
Portrayed by: Hiro Mizushima
A slacker, but talented guitarist, who inspires Koyuki to pick up the instrument. Ryusuke speaks better English than Japanese, having lived in New York for eight years. He is the lead guitarist of Beck as well as its founding member. A large part of the story revolves around him and his bullet-hole ridden Gibson Les Paul guitar, named Lucille.
Maho Minami (南 真帆, Minami Maho)
Voiced by: Miho Saiki, Sowelu (singing voice) (Japanese); Brina Palencia (English)
Portrayed by: Shioli Kutsuna
Maho is Ryusuke's younger half-sister and a talented singer. She is brash but emotionally fragile, and gradually builds a romantic relationship with Koyuki. As Maho is beautiful and fairly popular, Koyuki often has a hard time approaching her romantically. While she is obviously a gifted singer, Maho confides in Koyuki that she would actually like to be a film maker. She is also an amateur model.
Tsunemi Chiba (千葉 恒美, Chiba Tsunemi)
Voiced by: Shintaro Ohata, Tatsuzo (singing voice) (Japanese); Justin Cook (English)
Portrayed by: Kenta Kiritani
The main vocalist of Beck, Chiba's vocals are more punk and rap-oriented than Koyuki's and thus more fitting for the majority of Beck's songs. He is easily the most volatile member of Beck, never shying away from a fight or hiding his feelings during dire situations. He is also very good at karate, which he uses in his performances. He originally took up karate because he was bullied severely in his younger days. When not busy with the band, he helps manage his family's ramen shop; he says that if Beck doesn't work out, he would open up a chain of ramen shops. Towards the end of the series, Ryusuke tells him that he should leave the band because he thinks he is not as passionate about music as the rest of the band. He complies, but quickly returns to play with the band.
Yoshiyuki Taira (平 義行, Taira Yoshiyuki)
Voiced by: Kenji Nojima (Japanese); Jerry Jewell (English)
Portrayed by: Osamu Mukai
Beck's bassist, Taira is the second member recruited by Ryusuke. Although he can sometimes seem uncaring or apathetic, he is actually the most mature of the band members and often offers helpful advice. He usually performs shirtless, and his main bass is a white Music Man Stingray.
Kenichi Saito (斉藤 研一, Saitō Ken'ichi)
Voiced by: Porsche Okite (Japanese); R Bruce Elliott (English)
Portrayed by: Takanori Takeyama
Saito is a perverted middle-aged man and former Olympic swimmer who teaches Koyuki both guitar and swimming in exchange for Koyuki working for his business. Though he can be a demanding instructor, he opens up to Koyuki, even asking him for relationship advice on occasion.
Yuji "Saku" Sakurai (桜井 裕志, Sakurai Yūji)
Voiced by: Tōru Nara (Japanese); Johnny Yong Bosch (English)
Portrayed by: Aoi Nakamura
Saku is Beck's drummer and the last member to join (along with Koyuki). He first becomes good friends with Koyuki at school, being the only person to talk to him while bully Hyodo instigated the entire class not to do so. He is closer to Koyuki than the other members of the band, and Koyuki often confides in him during moments of self-doubt. Towards the end of the series, he moves away to attend high school, but promises that he will return on the condition that Beck reunites. As Koyuki does reform Beck, he returns, telling the band that he essentially ran away from home to do so.
Togo (持ち帰り, Togo)
Voiced by: Yoshiharu Taka (Japanese); Orion Pitts (English)
Portrayed by: Naoki Kawano
He is the original drummer of Ryusuke's band Beck. Togo and Ryusuke's were friends later he leaves the band due to some personal reasons; however, he is proud of Ryusuke.

== Production ==
Just as Harold Sakuishi realized there were so few manga about music, his editor told him, "you love music, why not do a manga about music?" The artist joked that he had to take the chance because if it failed, he could then blame it on the editor. Describing Beck, he said, "I really like music because I believe that in ordinary life it's something not ordinary to express a thing that is not fitted to our usual life. So actually music is an approach to some kind of truth and this manga is about those people who challenge and look for the truth." He also noted that he was inspired by American culture when creating the series. Discussing the difficulty of expressing music in manga, Yohei Takami, Sakuishi's editor at Kodansha, noted how in the early volumes of Beck, they included the scores in the art, but for the later volumes, they realized they did not need to do that as "the story was synchronized in the reader's mind". Sakuishi believes he was careful to leave room for the reader to imagine what the sound was like as he did not want to push his view of it onto them. He utilized his own experiences attending concerts, including the Fuji Rock Festival, for the concert and festival scenes in the manga. In 2006, the artist said his work schedule was to draw about five pages a day.

Sakuishi reportedly named the manga after both Jeff Beck and Beck. He used other famous musicians as models for aspects of the characters. The way Koyuki holds his guitar was based on that of Tom Morello, Ryusuke and his guitar playing were inspired by Jimmy Page, while Chiba's attitude and style were based on Zack de la Rocha. Sakuishi said that Chiba and Koyuki show different sides of his own personality, Chiba the evil side and Koyuki the good, while Saito was based on his swimming mentor. Chiba is also modeled after Daisuke Chiba, Sakuishi's friend and vocalist of the band Buckingham Q-Den. Buckingham Q-Den's guitarist is named Ryusuke Minami, and is therefore believed by Beck fans to be the name source of the manga's character with the same name.

Shunsuke Saga of the pop culture website Real Sound pointed out further references and inspirations. Taira's choice of bass, funky bass lines and shirtlessness all point to Flea, while the way Koyuki sings with his hands behind his back when without a guitar is taken from Liam Gallagher. Saga noted that theories on the model for Saku include Kazushi Sakuraba, as Sakuishi is a professional wrestling fan, and Dragon Ash drummer Makoto Sakurai, while the band Beck itself seems to be inspired by alternative rock acts from the 1980s and 1990s, such as Rage Against the Machine and the Red Hot Chili Peppers.

== Media ==
=== Manga ===
Written and illustrated by Harold Sakuishi, Beck debuted in Kodansha's shōnen manga magazine Monthly Shōnen Magazine in its July 1999 issue. The series finished on June 6, 2008; a special 77-page side-story was published on September 6 of the same year, which depicts the last day of Eddie Lee, a popular American rock musician and Ryusuke's friend. The 103 chapters (including the Eddie Lee special) were collected by Kodansha in 34 tankōbon volumes, released from February 17, 2000, to October 17, 2008. The series has since been republished in different formats. A 17-volume edition was released from December 12, 2013, to August 12, 2014. A seven-volume edition that combines five of the original volumes into one was published on September 17, 2020. A 17-volume shinsōban edition was released between December 17, 2024, and August 12, 2025.

The manga was licensed for an English-language release by Tokyopop, who began publishing it in July 2005. In January 2009, it was announced that Kodansha let all of Tokyopop's German licenses expire, thus including Beck. This subsequently led to Tokyopop's English license of Beck expiring as well. Only 12 volumes were published by June 2008. In 2018, ComiXology began releasing the series digitally; the first fourteen volumes were released simultaneously on July 5. The last twelve were released on February 27, 2019. In August 2025, Kodansha USA announced that they will be publishing the manga in a 2-in-1 omnibus edition, which began on November 17, 2026.

=== Anime ===
A 26-episode anime television adaptation, titled Beck: Mongolian Chop Squad after the subtitle used by the band in the manga in the United States, aired on Japan's TV Tokyo from October 2004 to March 2005. It was directed by Osamu Kobayashi, animated by Madhouse and produced by Takeshi Shukuri and Yoshimi Nakajima.

In 2006, Funimation (later Crunchyroll, LLC) announced that they had acquired the North American license for Beck: Mongolian Chop Squad at Anime Boston on May 27. Taliesin Jaffe (director of the English dub of Hellsing) and Christopher Bevins (director of the dubs of Speed Grapher and Samurai 7) are the ADR directors of their English dub, while Mike McFarland served as music director.

In the English dub, many songs were re-recorded with new English lyrics and vocals. For example, the Beatles' song "I've Got a Feeling" had its lyrics completely replaced. For songs that had English lyrics in the original Japanese version, some were slightly altered to correct grammar, while a few were retained and the dub team cast English-speaking actors who sounded like the Japanese vocalists. Due to B. B. King holding a trademark on the name "Lucille", the dub changed the name of Ryusuke's guitar to "Prudence" to avoid any potential legal issues.

Beck: Mongolian Chop Squad made its North American television debut on the Canadian music channel MuchMusic on March 9, 2007, and finished on June 3. Funimation's first DVD was released in 2007, and the sixth and final in January 2008. Their English dub was released in the UK by Revelation Films and in Australasia by Madman Entertainment.

=== Live-action film ===
The main cast of the live-action film, from left to right: Kenta Kiritani, Aoi Nakamura, Hiro Mizushima, Takeru Satoh and Osamu Mukai

A live-action film adaptation of the Beck manga was announced in 2009, with filming beginning in July. It was produced and directed by Yukihiko Tsutsumi, who has directed manga-to-film adaptations in the past (most notably the 20th Century Boys trilogy). It stars Takeru Satoh as Koyuki, Hiro Mizushima as Ryusuke, Kenta Kiritani as Chiba, Aoi Nakamura as Saku and Osamu Mukai as Taira. The actors were given proper training on their instruments for the 30 original songs that were written for the film.

Beck was released nationwide in movie theaters on September 4, 2010. Red Hot Chili Peppers and Oasis provide the opening and ending theme songs, "Around the World" and "Don't Look Back in Anger" respectively.

Grand Funk Inc. was given the Japan Academy Prize for Outstanding Achievement in Music for its music work in the film. The movie was released on DVD and Blu-ray on February 2, 2011. The DVD came in "standard" and "luxury" editions, with the luxury edition including a bonus DVD.

=== Soundtracks ===
In 2002, the manga received a tribute album featuring several different artists. The songs used in the anime that were performed by the character's voice actors with Beat Crusaders were released on a soundtrack in 2002. That same day an album featuring those same songs, but in their original versions, was released. A soundtrack to the live-action movie was released in 2010.

=== Other media ===
Four guidebooks to Beck were published during the manga's serialization; Beck Volume 0 The Guide Book on November 13, 2002, Beck Volume 00 The Guidebook Ex on March 17, 2004, Beck Music Guide on October 17, 2005, and Beck At Last Volume 33 1/3 on October 17, 2008. Kodansha compiled and revised these four books into Beck The Guidebook Complete Edition, which was released on August 17, 2010, and includes new information. They also published Beck Live! -Festival & Movie Guide- on July 16, 2010. Supervised by Sakuishi, it explores the history of music festivals, includes commentary on rock films provided by the character Saito, and information about the live-action film adaptation of Beck. The official guide to the film was released the following month.

On March 31, 2005, Marvelous Interactive released an adventure video game for the PlayStation 2 based on the series, titled Beck: The Game.

Fender Japan produced two signature Beck guitars based on those played by Koyuki. A Fender Telecaster, the TL68-BECK, was released in December 2003, and a Fender Mustang, the MG69-BECK/CO, was announced in 2009. The series' logo and an image of the dog Beck are printed on the back of the guitars' headstocks. Signature guitar picks designed by Sakuishi were released in 2010 in collaboration with ESP Guitars.

== Reception ==
=== Manga reception ===
Beck won the 2002 Kodansha Manga Award in the shōnen category. The series sold 12 million copies by April 2008, and over 15 million by 2014. Manga artist Naoshi Arakawa, best known for his music-themed series Your Lie in April, cited Beck as the reason he got into manga. According to Keisuke Okutsu of Hon no Hikidashi, Beck had a large impact on the music scene and inspired many Japanese musicians' interest in Western music.

Real Sound's Kazushi Shimada wrote that the manga's clever connections to real-world music trends of the time, such as the boom in outdoor festivals and the rise of loud rock and mixture rock bands, helped make it a huge hit that overturned the conventional wisdom that band manga did not sell. He also pointed out that while To-y was a hit in the 1980s, it features idol elements and the main character abandons his band members in his quest to reach the top, so it lacks the cathartic feeling of a band manga, and that Nana, which was serialized at the same time as Beck, is largely a romance series with few scenes that show the "magic of a band" like Beck does.

Voice actor and musician Soma Saito named Beck as the best music or band-related manga series, citing how it is able to depict music in a world without sound as his favorite part; "when I close my eyes, I feel like I can hear songs that shouldn't be audible. Koyuki's transparent singing. The one-of-a-kind music played by BECK." Having first read it as he discovered his own love for music while playing in a middle school band, Saito said he empathized with the realistic portrayal of Koyuki, specifically mentioning his crush on a senior and timid first experience at a live music venue, but noted the series has many unique characters that add depth to the story.

Reviewing the first volume of Beck, IGN called it a "must read" and one of the truest examples of life as a teenager. They wrote that Sakuishi's weaving of the story with the unique aspects of growing up in Japan show that he knows the subject matter well, but criticized Tokyopop's large amount of explanatory notes. Danica Davidson of Otaku USA wrote that despite having to set up the story, the first volume remains fast-paced and amusing throughout, with each character standing on their own. She noted that the many references to real-life musicians add extra fun for music fans, but that one does not need to be "musically minded" to enjoy the series.

=== Anime reception ===
Carl Kimlinger of Anime News Network wrote that the Beck anime adaptation distinguishes itself from other shows of its kind with its "exceptionally realistic" depiction of the birth of Koyuki's passion for music and by how well it evokes the "sweaty allure" of the underground rock scene. He described its pace as lacking both self-contained narratives and an orderly procession of events, "It simply presents its characters' lives, complete in their mundanity and excitement and all the stuff in-between." Although he noted this realism sometimes comes at the expense of intensity, Kimlinger praised director and character designer Osamu Kobayashi's skill at regulating the mood and for his simple yet attractive character designs.

Reviewing Beck for AnimeOnDVD.com, Chris Beveridge wrote that it is filled with lots of great music, fun characters and engaging situations. He found its "honesty" about the impact of music to be on a level not seen in any other series, and Koyuki's growth to be very well done and one of the show's charms. Although he felt the anime's adoption of a streamlined pace works better for the animated form, it lacked some of his favorite subplots from the original manga and lost some of the lackadaisical attitude of teenagers. Beveridge criticized Funimation's DVD authoring for the amount of background noise that caused macroblocking.

Kimlinger, his colleague Mark Sombillo, and Beveridge all praised the show's animation during concert scenes, with Beveridge noting how their soft focus and intentional noise give them the feel of a real concert. Kimlinger strongly praised Funimation's English dub for its hiring of people who can actually sing and for remedying the problem created by the original's language division between Japanese and English by replacing it with a cultural one instead. However, Beveridge opined that the dub's cleaning up of the English lyrics and its smoother and clearer pronunciation lost some of the original's charm.
