= Beast Wars II: Super Life-Form Transformers =

1998 animated TV series

- Beast Wars II
- Promotional poster

ビーストウォーズII 超生命体トランスフォーマー
- Genre: Adventure, mecha
- Created by: Shōji Imaki
- Anime television series
- Directed by: Osamu Sekita
- Produced by: Makiko Iwata (TV Tokyo); Hirofumi Umeshita; Akiyoshi Sakai
- Written by: Junki Takegami
- Music by: Yūzō Hayashi
- Studio: Ashi Productions
- Original network: TXN (TV Tokyo)
- Original run: April 1, 1998 – January 27, 1999
- Episodes: 43
- Manga
- Written by: Shōji Imaki
- Published by: Kodansha
- Imprint: BomBom KC
- Magazine: Comic BomBom
- Original run: June 30, 1998 – March 1999
- Volumes: 2

Beast Wars II: Super Life-Form Transformers (ビーストウォーズII 超生命体トランスフォーマー) is a 1998 Japanese Transformers anime series, spawning a movie and a toyline. It was broadcast on TV Tokyo from April 1998 to January 1999, and was the first Transformers anime to be produced by Nihon Ad Systems and animated by the studio Ashi Productions. The series was preceded by Beast Wars: Transformers, and was followed by Super Life-Form Transformers: Beast Wars Neo. The series has a much lighter tone and is aimed more toward children, whereas the more accessible Beast Wars was intended for a wider age-range. The anime uses conventional animation rather than the CGI of its predecessor. With the exception of the faction leaders, all of the characters within the toy-line are either remolds, reissues, or recolors of earlier Beast Wars or Generation 2/Machine Wars toys.

In addition to the 43 episodes, there is also a 50-minute movie, Beast Wars II: Lio Convoy's Close Call!, which takes place sometime between episodes 32 and 38, and a manga adaptation by Shōji Imaki that was serialized in Comic BomBom from July 1998 to February 1999, also localized in Korea by Daewon Media. The anime was also released in Korea, and it was broadcast on SBS.

== Plot ==
Beast Wars II tells the story of a battle waging between Lio Convoy's team of Cybertrons (Maximals) and Galvatron's army of Destrons (Predacons) on the planet Gaia. As Lio Convoy and Galvatron fight over the mysterious energy source known as Angolmois Energy, many strange occurrences and mysterious properties of Angolmois Energy begin to arise.

== Characters ==
=== Main characters ===
- Maximals — Descendants of the Autobots who defend post-apocalyptic Earth, or Gaia, and its Angolmois Energy from the Predacons.
  - Lio Convoy — The battle-hardened yet kind, honest, and gentle commander of a Maximal crew based in the starship Star Voyager, with a strong sense of right and wrong. After being lured into a trap by Galvatron and crash-landing on Gaia, Lio Convoy was rescued by a white lion and brought to a cave laced with Angolmois Energy, which healed his injuries. Afterward, he adopted the lion's form as an alternate mode.
  - Apache — Lio Convoy's cool-headed yet mildly eccentric second-in-command and a triple-changer who can transform into a mandrill and a weapon-laden fortress mode.
  - Bighorn — A gentle and nature-loving yet battle-hungry warrior who can transform into a bison and gets angry at the sight of the color red. In combat, he wields the "Buffalo Missile" gun.
  - Scuba — A cool, shy, solitary, and pessimistic Maximal who can transform into a squid and specializes in underwater combat
  - Tasmania Kid — An adventurous prankster and the youngest member of Lio Convoy's group who can transform into a Tasmanian devil, wields the "Tasmania Fangs", specializes in close-quarters combat, and desires to be recognized as a full-fledged warrior.
  - Diver — A prudent yet timid and careless Niagara base guard who can transform into a frog and usually tries to avoid dangerous work by claiming it is his grandfather's dying wish, though he will charge into battle for his friends.
- Predacons — Descendants of the Decepticons who seek to conquer Cybertron and the universe via the power of Angolmois Energy.
  - Galvatron — An idealistic and fastidious Predacon emperor and triple-changer who can transform into a mechanical dragon and an armored drilling vehicle. He seeks to conquer the universe, though he displays unexpected affection for his subordinates. Despite often being knocked out by the Maximals and his second-in-command Megastorm, Galvatron possesses incredible power. After being defeated and killed by Lio Convoy and Lio Junior at the end of the series, Unicron possesses Galvatron's body in Beast Wars Neo.
  - Megastorm — Galvatron's grounded second-in-command and younger brother who can transform into a tank. Due to Galvatron's caution around Angolmois Energy, Megastorm gradually becomes mistrustful of and disloyal to his brother. After the Maximals add Magnaboss to their ranks, Megastorm dives into a pool of liquid Angolmois Energy and is reformatted into Gigastorm, becoming a monolithic triple-changer with a robotic theropod-like default form and the ability to transform into an armored base and a fortress in the process.
  - Starscream — A prideful, narcissistic, and ambitious Predacon partnered with BB who can transform into a fighter jet and dreams of overthrowing Galvatron as the Predacons' leader. After being blasted into a pool of liquid Angolmois Energy by Gigastorm, it reacts to Starscream's hatred and reformats him into the savage and cruel Hellscream, granting him the ability to transform into a cyborg shark.
  - BB — A large, dutiful, and reliable Predacon triple-changer partnered with Starscream who possesses limited speech capacity and can transform into a stealth bomber and a tank. After being blasted into a pool of liquid Angolmois Energy by Gigastorm, it reacts to BB's hatred and reformats him into the ferocious Max B, granting him the ability to transform into a cyborg wolf.
  - Dirge — A "sonic soldier" partnered with Thrust who can transform into a Dassault Rafale fighter jet and often serves as the "straight man" to Thrust's antics. Seeking increased power, Dirge agrees to let Gigastorm give him an Angolmois Energy transfusion, which reformats the former into Dirgegun and grants the ability to transform into a cyborg wasp.
  - Thrust — A Predacon partnered with Dirge who can transform into a Lockheed Martin F-22 Raptor fighter jet and behaves similarly to a stand-up comedian, to Dirge's chagrin. Seeking increased power, Thrust agrees to let Gigastorm give him an Angolmois Energy transfusion, which reformats the former into Thrustor and grants the ability to transform into a cyborg raptor.

=== Recurring characters ===
- Lio Junior — An innocent, free-spirited, and wild Maximal and young clone of Lio Convoy created from Angolmois Energy and the latter's Energon Matrix who can transform into a lion as well as combine with Skywarp and Santon to become Magnaboss as well as with Lio Convoy to strengthen him.
- Skywarp — A strict yet considerate Maximal aerial combat instructor sent with Santon to reinforce Lio Convoy's group who can transform into an eagle, combine with Lio Junior and Santon to become Magnaboss, produce sonic booms, and wields the twin Wing Calibur swords and Sky Missiles.
- Santon — A philanthropic Maximal medic sent with Skywarp to reinforce Lio Convoy's group who can transform into an elephant, combine with Lio Junior and Skywarp to become Magnaboss, wields the non-lethal Ki-Shot cannons, perform the "Santon Quake" attack, and produce the Santon Shield barrier.
- Insectrons — Former mercenaries and rivals of the Autorollers who can all transform into insects and settled down in Gaia's Antarctic region to live in peace. After Starscream tricks them into fighting the Maximals, the Insectrons realize the truth and join forces with the latter.
  - Bigmos — The Insectrons' leader and a triple-changer who can transform into a mosquito and an antlion-like "Hell Scissor" mode.
  - Powerhug — A straightforward judo practitioner who can transform into a pill bug and seeks vengeance against the Autorollers.
  - Tonbot — A flashy spy who can transform into a dragonfly and possesses the fastest flight speed of the Insectrons.
  - Mantis — An independent and territorial samurai who can transform into his namesake.
  - Drillnuts — The Insectrons' sarcastic yet tenacious bomb expert and self-proclaimed "greatest inventor" who builds useless gadgets and can transform into a boll weevil.
  - Scissorboy — A talkative and quick-witted Insectron and friend of Tasmania Kid who can transform into an earwig.
- Jointrons — A trio of brothers who can combine to form Tripledacus and display an affinity for Mexican culture.
  - DJ — The eldest of the Jointron brothers who can transform into a cicada.
  - Motorarm — The over-excited middle brother and a sumo wrestler who can transform into a Japanese rhinoceros beetle and possesses the most strength of the three.
  - Gimlet — The cheerful youngest of the Jointron brothers who can transform into a lobster.
- Autorollers — A group of Predacon bodyguards and rivals of the Insectrons who serve directly under and are loyal to Galvatron.
  - Autostinger — The Autorollers' captain and a warrior once reputed to be an accomplished mercenary who can transform into a dump truck. After he was nearly killed by the Predacons and saved from execution by Galvatron, Autostinger pledged his loyalty to him ever since.
  - Autocrusher — A tough sergeant and the oldest member of the Autorollers who browbeats the other Predacons and can transform into a payloader.
  - Autojetter — A problematic Autoroller who enjoys war for his own pleasure, specializes in preserving Galvatron's air supremacy, and can transform into an F/A-18 fighter jet.
  - Autolauncher — A glory hog who often neglects Galvatron's safety to focus on being the first to attack his enemies and can transform into an armoured personnel carrier.
- Seacon Space Pirates — A group of rogue Predacons who can all transform into monstrous sea creatures, combine to form God Neptune, and seek to collect Angolmois Energy for their own purposes.
  - Halfshell — The Seacons' noble, calculating, and greedy captain who can transform into a sea turtle and is merciless with enemies and gentle towards his crew.
  - Scylla — A vain and vindictive Seacon who can transform into a squid and displays an unrequited crush on Scuba.
  - Coelagon — An elderly Seacon who can transform into a coelacanth and frequently claims to be knowledgeable in treasure-related matters despite being frequently wrong.
  - Seaphantom — A warlike Seacon who specializes in surprise attacks and can transform into a shark.
  - Terrormander — The Seacons' lazy, carefree junior member who can transform into a manta ray.

=== Guest characters ===
- Artemis — A flighty mysterious gynoid who watches the Maximals and Predacons' battles from Gaia's moon. She primarily supports the former due in part to her crush on Scuba, but is torn due to also being smitten with Starscream.
- Moon — A calm Cybertronian rabbit who watches over Gaia with Artemis and often sides with the Maximals due to the Predacons' destructive tendencies.
- Ikard — Scuba's cool, gentle, and erudite cousin who can also transform into a squid.
- Copy Convoy — A sinister clone of Lio Convoy created by mysterious technology that Tasmania Kid found.

=== Spin-off exclusive characters ===
- Star Upper — A proud Maximal who can transform into a kangaroo, fears not being good enough to be a real warrior, and appears exclusively in the series' tie-in manga and video game.
- Majin Zarak — A mysterious super-weapon with a demonic robot mode and a heavily armed base mode that only exists to destroy, is capable of destroying armies, and appears exclusively in the film Beast Wars II: Lio Convoy's Close Call!.
- Optimus Primal — A Maximal commander from another time period who can transform into a gorilla and appears exclusively in the film Beast Wars II: Lio Convoy's Close Call!. Magnaboss brings him to the present to help Lio Convoy defeat Majin Zarak before Primal is returned to his time.

== Theme songs ==
- Openings
1. "GET MY FUTURE"
  - April 1, 1998 -September 30, 1998
  - Lyricist: Cyber Nation Network / Composer: Cyber Nation Network / Arranger: Cyber Nation Network / Singers: Cyber Nation Network
  - Episodes: 1-27
2. "SUPER VOYAGER"
  - October 7, 1998 - January 27, 1999
  - Lyricist: Cyber Nation Network / Composer: Cyber Nation Network / Arranger: Cyber Nation Network / Singers: Cyber Nation Network
  - Episodes: 28–43
- Endings
1. "Places Where Dreams Go" (夢のいる場所, Yume no Iru basho)
  - April 1, 1998 - January 27, 1999
  - Lyricist: Eiko Kiyo / Composer: Hiroto Ishikawa / Arranger: Seiichi Kyoda / Singers: Jun Yoneya
  - Episodes: 1–43
- Insert Songs
1. "SPACE DREAMER - Distant Beast Wars" (SPACE DREAMER 〜遥かなるビーストウォーズ〜)
  - Lyricist: Kensaku Saito / Composer: Hideki Fujisawa / Arranger: Hideki Fujisawa / Singers: COA
2. "MY SHOOTING STAR"
  - Lyricist: COA / Composer: COA / Arranger: COA / Singers: COA

== Episodes ==
No.	Title	Written by	Original release date
1	"New Forces Arrive!" (Japanese: 新軍団登場！)	Junki Takegami	April 1, 1998
2	"White Lion, Run!" (Japanese: 白いライオン、走る！)	Junki Takegami	April 8, 1998
3	"Bighorn's Anger" (Japanese: ビッグホーンの怒り)	Yukiyoshi Ohashi	April 15, 1998
4	"The Lake Trap" (Japanese: 湖のワナ)	Kazuhiko Godo	April 22, 1998
5	"Galvatron Resurrected" (Japanese: 復活ガルバトロン)	Yukiyoshi Ohashi	April 29, 1998
6	"Mystery of the Ancient Ruins" (Japanese: 古代遺跡のナゾ)	Junki Takegami	May 6, 1998
7	"The Insect Army Arrives!" (Japanese: 昆虫軍団現わる！)	Kazuhiko Godo	May 13, 1998
8	"Friend or Foe? Insect Robos" (Japanese: 敵・味方？昆虫ロボ)	Yukiyoshi Ohashi	May 20, 1998
9	"The Strongest Tag Team?" (Japanese: 最強タッグ結成？)	Kazuhiko Godo	May 27, 1998
10	"Autorollers, Move Out!" (Japanese: オートローラーズ出撃せよ！)	Kazuhiko Godo	June 3, 1998
11	"Danger! Scissor Boy" (Japanese: 危うし！シザーボーイ)	Yukiyoshi Ohashi	June 10, 1998
12	"Galvatron's Great Rampage!!" (Japanese: ガルバトロン大暴走！！)	Junki Takegami	June 17, 1998
13	"Destron General Offensive!" (Japanese: デストロン総攻撃！)	Junki Takegami, Yukiyoshi Ohashi, Kazuhiko Godo	June 24, 1998
A clip show of the Insectron episodes.
14	"Combined Giant Tripledacus" (Japanese: 合体巨人トリプルダクス)	Yukiyoshi Ohashi	July 1, 1998
15	"The Festive Jointrons" (Japanese: 陽気なジョイントロン)	Kazuhiko Godo	July 8, 1998
16	"A Fearsome Combination Plan?" (Japanese: 恐るべし合体作戦？)	Junki Takegami	July 15, 1998
17	"Who Is the Leader!?" (Japanese: リーダーは誰だ！？)	Yukiyoshi Ohashi	July 22, 1998
18	"Black Lio Convoy" (Japanese: 黒いライオコンボイ)	Junki Takegami	July 29, 1998
19	"Space Pirate Seacons!" (Japanese: 宇宙海賊シーコンズ！)	Junki Takegami	August 5, 1998
20	"Who Is the Strongest Warrior!?" (Japanese: 最強戦士は誰だ！？)	Junki Takegami	August 12, 1998
A clip show gauging the best Transformers.
21	"The Cool Squid Scuba" (Japanese: イカしたスクーバ)	Yukiyoshi Ohashi	August 19, 1998
22	"Megastorm's Reckoning" (Japanese: メガストームの計算)	Kazuhiko Godo	August 26, 1998
23	"Underwater Showdown" (Japanese: 海中の対決)	Junki Takegami	September 2, 1998
24	"Face the Setting Sun" (Japanese: 夕陽に向かって)	Yukiyoshi Ohashi	September 9, 1998
25	"The Final Battle" (Japanese: 最後の戦い)	Kazuhiko Godo	September 16, 1998
26	"Enter Lio Junior" (Japanese: ライオジュニア登場)	Junki Takegami	September 23, 1998
27	"Megastorm Reborn" (Japanese: 新生メガストーム)	Junki Takegami	September 30, 1998
28	"New Weapon Tako Tank" (Japanese: 新兵器タコタンク)	Yukiyoshi Ohashi	October 7, 1998
29	"Artificial Planet Nemesis" (Japanese: 人工惑星ネメシス)	Junki Takegami	October 14, 1998
A clip show.
30	"Gigastorm's Treachery" (Japanese: ギガストームの裏切り)	Yukiyoshi Ohashi	October 21, 1998
31	"Starscream's Last Moments" (Japanese: スタースクリームの最期)	Junki Takegami	October 28, 1998
32	"The Lio Convoy Assassination Plot" (Japanese: ライオコンボイ暗殺計画)	Junki Takegami	November 4, 1998
33	"The Great Angolmois Freezing Operation" (Japanese: アンゴルモア冷凍大作戦)	Yukiyoshi Ohashi	November 11, 1998
34	"Knock Out Nemesis!" (Japanese: ネメシスをぶっ飛ばせ！)	Junki Takegami	November 18, 1998
35	"Lio Junior's Revolt!" (Japanese: ライオジュニアの反乱！)	Kazuhiko Godo	November 25, 1998
36	"Messenger of the Fourth Planet" (Japanese: 第四惑星の使者)	Junki Takegami	December 2, 1998
37	"The Crisis of Planet Gaia" (Japanese: 惑星ガイアの危機)	Junki Takegami	December 9, 1998
38	"Fly Out! Planet Gaia" (Japanese: 飛び出せ！惑星ガイア)	Yukiyoshi Ohashi	December 16, 1998
39	"Assemble! Thirty-Nine Warriors" (Japanese: 勢揃い！三十九戦士)	Junki Takegami	December 23, 1998
A clip show showcasing transforming sequences and the combiners.
40	"Revenge of the Space Pirates" (Japanese: 宇宙海賊の復讐)	Kazuhiko Godo	January 6, 1999
41	"Breaking into Nemesis" (Japanese: ネメシスへの突入)	Junki Takegami	January 13, 1999
42	"Legend! The Green Warrior" (Japanese: 伝説！緑の戦士)	Junki Takegami	January 20, 1999
43	"Farewell! Lio Convoy" (Japanese: さらば！ライオコンボイ)	Junki Takegami	January 27, 1999
Galvatron and Lio Convoy have their final confrontation.

== Chapters ==
No.	Japanese release date	Japanese ISBN
1	November 6, 1998	4-06-323852-0
MISSION-001: "Demolish the Superdreadnought Tank!" (超弩級戦車を粉砕せよ！) (June 30, 1998 ISBN 978-4-06-344025-6); MISSION-002: "Infiltrate the Mysterious Island!" (神秘島に潜入せよ！) (September 4, 1998 ISBN 978-4-06-344071-3); MISSION-003: "Free the Captured Soul!" (捕われし魂を解放せよ！) (November 10, 1998 ISBN 978-4-06-344037-9); MISSION-004: "Realize the Forbidden Love!" (禁断の恋を成就せよ！) (December 12, 1998 ISBN 978-4-06-344045-4)
2	March 5, 1999	4-06-323864-4
MISSION-005: "Make a Surprise Attack on the Super Weapon Base!" (超兵器基地を奇襲せよ！) (November 1998); MISSION-006: "Recover the Bonds Lost!" (失なわれた絆を奪回せよ！) (December 1998); MISSION-007: "All Hands, Make a Special Attack on the Evil Planet!" (総員、凶惑星に特攻せよ！) (January 1999); FINAL-MISSION: "Win the Battle of Light and Darkness!" (光と闇の戦いに勝利せよ！) (February 1999); EPILOGUE: "Beast Wars "Neo" Begins!!!" (ビーストウォーズ"ネオ"開戦！！！) (March 1999)

== Toy line ==
The series was primarily repaints of non-show Beast Wars figures and repaints of Generation 2 figures, including two unreleased Autoroller figures and the black Dreadwing/Smokecreen repaint, planned for the cancelled 1996 assortment of figures. In both cases the items were recolored and slightly remolded; repainted versions of five of the Seacons also served as new Predacon characters.

The series did feature new molds for Lio Convoy and Galvatron, as well as the Tako Tank. Generation 1 Trypticon, and Beast Wars Dinobot, Cybershark, Wolfang, and Waspinator were remolded as "upgraded" versions of Megastorm, Starscream, BB, Dirge and Thrust.

The remolded Cybershark saw release as Overbite in the U.S. as Universe exclusive.
