= List of Transformers animated series =

Launched in 1984, the Transformers toyline by Takara Tomy and Hasbro was promoted through both a comic book by Marvel Comics and an animated series produced by Sunbow Productions and Marvel Productions with Toei Animation. Although the comic outlived the animated series by a number of years, the animated series is more widely recognised. With the original show's conclusion in 1987, original series exclusive to Japan were created which ran until 1990, and the franchise was later re-imagined with the fully CGI Beast Wars in the late 1990s. The 21st century saw a total reboot of the Transformers universe (first being Takara's produced Car Robots, imported and retitled for Western release as Transformers: Robots in Disguise), as Hasbro collaborated with Japanese Transformers producers Takara to create a new storyline with Transformers: Armada and its sequels, produced in Japan and then dubbed for English-speaking audience. In 2008, Transformers Animated saw Hasbro take control of the franchise once more through collaboration with Cartoon Network, bringing writing duties back to America, with animation being handled by Japanese studios. Hasbro also reacquired the distribution rights to the original series from Sunbow finally giving them the complete rights to the series based on their Generation 1 toy-line.

== Overview ==
No.	Title	Episodes	Originally released
GoBots
1	Challenge of the GoBots	65	September 8, 1984 – December 13, 1985
Movie	GoBots: Battle of the Rock Lords	–	March 21, 1986
Transformers: Generation 1
2	The Transformers	98	September 17, 1984 – November 11, 1987
Movie	The Transformers: The Movie	–	August 8, 1986
3	Transformers: The Headmasters	35	July 3, 1987 – March 25, 1988
4	Transformers: Super-God Masterforce	42	April 12, 1988 – March 7, 1989
5	Transformers: Victory	44	March 14, 1989 – December 19, 1989
OVA	Transformers: Zone	–	July 21, 1990
6	Transformers: Generation 2	52	August 20, 1993 – September 23, 1993
Beast Era
7	Beast Wars: Transformers	52	September 16, 1996 – May 7, 1999
8	Beast Wars II	43	April 1, 1998 – January 27, 1999
Movie	Beast Wars II: Lio Convoy's Close Call!	–	December 19, 1998
9	Beast Wars Neo	35	February 3, 1999 – September 29, 1999
10	Beast Machines	26	September 18, 1999 – November 18, 2000
11	Transformers: Robots in Disguise (2000)	39	April 5, 2000 – December 27, 2000
Unicron Trilogy
12	Transformers: Armada	52	August 23, 2002 – December 26, 2003
13	Transformers: Energon	51	January 9, 2004 – December 24, 2004
14	Transformers: Cybertron	52	January 8, 2005 – December 31, 2005
15	Transformers: Animated	42	December 26, 2007 – May 23, 2009
16	Transformers: Cyber Missions	13	January 21, 2010 – September 29, 2010
Aligned Continuity
17	Transformers: Prime	65	November 29, 2010 – July 26, 2013
18	Transformers: Rescue Bots	104	February 18, 2012 – October 22, 2016
OVAs	Transformers Go!	10	July 1, 2013 – April 1, 2014
Movie	Transformers Prime Beast Hunters: Predacons Rising	–	October 4, 2013
19	Transformers: Robots in Disguise (2015)	71	March 14, 2015 – November 11, 2017
20	Transformers: Rescue Bots Academy	104	January 5, 2019 – June 5, 2021
Mystery of Convoy
21	Q Transformers: Mystery of Convoy Returns	13	January 6, 2015 – March 31, 2015
22	Q Transformers: The Road to Additional Popularity	13	July 6, 2015 – October 1, 2015
Prime Wars Trilogy
23	Transformers: Combiner Wars	8	August 2, 2016 – September 20, 2016
24	Transformers: Titans Return	10	November 14, 2017 – January 9, 2018
25	Transformers: Power of the Primes	10	May 1, 2018 – July 3, 2018
26	Transformers: Cyberverse	64	August 27, 2018 – December 22, 2021
27	War for Cybertron Trilogy	18	July 30, 2020 – July 29, 2021
28	Transformers: BotBots	10	March 25, 2022
29	Transformers: EarthSpark	46	November 11, 2022 – December 5, 2025
30	Transformers: Wild King	17	March 26, 2025 – present
31	Transformers: Cyberworld	19	July 12, 2025 – present
Total		1306	September 8, 1984 – present

== Gobots ==
Although initially a separate and competing franchise in 1984, Tonka's Gobots became the intellectual property of Hasbro after their buyout of Tonka in 1991. Subsequently, the universe depicted in the animated series and its follow-up film was established as an alternate universe within the Transformers Multiverse.

== Transformers: Generation 1 ==
The term "Generation 1", or "G1", is a retronym, coined after the advent of 1992's Transformers: Generation 2. Although frequently used to simply refer to the original 1984–1991 Marvel comic series, 1984–1987 animated series, the term encompasses all Transformers fiction from 1984 to 1992.

Series	Season	Episodes	First aired	Last aired	Network	Status
The Transformers	1	16	September 17, 1984	December 15, 1984	Syndication	Released
The Transformers	2	49	September 23, 1985	January 9, 1986	Syndication	Released
The Transformers	3	30	September 15, 1986	February 25, 1987	Syndication	Released
The Transformers	4	3	November 9, 1987	November 11, 1987	Syndication	Released
Transformers: The Headmasters	5	35	July 3, 1987	March 25, 1988	Nippon TV (Japan)	Released
Transformers: Super-God Masterforce	6	42	April 12, 1988	March 7, 1989	Nippon TV (Japan)	Released
Transformers: Victory	7	38	March 14, 1989	December 19, 1989	Nippon TV (Japan)	Released
Transformers: Zone	SP	1	July 21, 1990	July 21, 1990	OVA	Released

=== The Transformers ===
After the Federal Communications Commission did away with regulations that prohibited toy companies from broadcasting cartoons based on their products in 1985, The Transformers began with a three-episode miniseries that introduced audiences to Optimus Prime, Megatron and their armies, as they travelled from the metal world of Cybertron to Earth in search of new sources of energy. The final episode ended on an open note, should the series prove popular enough to continue, which it did. A standard season's worth of 13 more episodes was commissioned, expanding the Transformers universe in which the Dinobots, Constructicons and Jetfire (later called Skyfire) made their debut. With popularity rising, the second season soon followed in 1986 at a mammoth 49 episodes (in order to bring the total up to 65, for syndication). Dozens of new characters were introduced throughout the season, including the Triple Changers, the combining teams the Aerialbots, Stunticons, Combaticons and Protectobots, and more new Autobot cars and Decepticon planes, while many new ideas and concepts began to establish the history of the Transformers universe.

These 65 episodes were exported to Japan in the same year, where their airing order was rearranged and the series was broadcast under the title of Fight! Super Robot Lifeform Transformers. An OVA exclusive to Japan entitled Scramble City was released which cast focus on the combining teams and introduced Ultra Magnus, Metroplex, Ratbat, Trypticon, and Blaster's cassettes. This video does not perfectly fit into the continuity of the American series due to its different origin story for Trypticon (known as Dinosaurer in the Japanese version).

1986 marked a huge change for The Transformers with the summer screening of The Transformers: The Movie, which jumped the action forward in time twenty years to the then-future of 2005 and pitted both the Autobots and Decepticons against the menace of the planet-eating robot Unicron. Optimus Prime is killed by Megatron, with Ultra Magnus briefly replacing him as a leader before being succeeded by Rodimus Prime. Megatron himself is recreated by Unicron as Galvatron. Many more of the old guard Transformers were killed, coinciding with their toys leaving store shelves to make room for a new cast of characters created for the film.

1986 also saw the start of the third season of the animated series, which took its cue from the film. The season picking up precisely where it had left off with Rodimus in command and the Decepticons in exile with Galvatron missing. The season opened with a five-part miniseries entitled Five Faces of Darkness which saw Galvatron return and brought to prominence the Quintessons, multi-faced aliens introduced in the film who are revealed to be the creators of the Transformer race, and became a recurring third factor as the season continued through its setting of 2006. The addition of Flint Dille as story editor gave a strong sci-fi aspect to the season as the Transformers' battles spanned many alien planets, while continuity between episode was tighter than ever before as plot concepts were revisited and expanded to flesh out the show's history. Running to 30 episodes, the third season ended with the two-part The Return of Optimus Prime, bringing the legendary Autobot leader back to life. Broadcast in Japan once again, the series was retitled Fight! Super Robot Lifeform Transformers: 2010 (or Transformers: 2010 for short), advancing its setting to the eponymous year.

1987 marked the end of the original American series, mirroring its beginning with a three-part miniseries entitled The Rebirth. Penned by regular series writer David Wise (who had previously written several of the series' mythology-building episodes), this finale story introduced the Headmasters and Targetmasters, as well as several other characters. Concluding with the restoration of Cybertron's Golden Age, the Decepticons stole the final scene of the series to prove that their threat still lingered. It is unknown the exact reason the American series ended after the film, though it is assumed that Sunbow had lost its contract to keep its cartoons running by 1987 (the final Transformers episode "The Rebirth" coincided with the final G.I. Joe episode G.I. Joe: The Movie).

Additionally, a fifth season of sorts was aired in 1988, serving as a kind of "best of" collection of the series. The most notable feature of this twenty-episode run was the new intro and concluding segments added to the episodes, which consisted of Powermaster Optimus Prime (rendered in a mixture of puppetry and stop motion animation) relating the events of the episodes to a human boy named Tommy Kennedy. The opening sequence comprised animation taken from contemporary toy adverts, and Prime occasionally referred to new toy characters like Cloudburst. Apparently never re-run after its original airing, the series aired More Than Meets the Eye Parts 1-3, Five Faces of Darkness Parts 1-5, Dark Awakening, the out-of-place Surprise Party, The Return of Optimus Prime Parts 1-2, The Rebirth Parts 1-3, and most notably, The Transformers: The Movie, split up and aired in five segments, with Stan Bush's music video for "The Touch" included in the final part.

=== Transformers: The Headmasters ===
Rather than import The Rebirth as a conclusion, Takara, the Japanese producers of the Transformers toyline, opted instead to continue the Generation 1 universe by creating the full-length 35-episode series, Transformers: The Headmasters (two additional clips episodes were produced after the fact for direct-to-video release). Supplanting The Rebirth's position in Japanese continuity, The Headmasters occurred one year after The Return of Optimus Prime, introducing the title characters to the Transformers universe in a different way. Whereas in western fiction, the Headmasters result from the merging of a Transformer with an organic alien being from the planet Nebulos, the Headmasters of the Japanese series are a group of small Cybertronians who departed the planet millions of years ago and crash landed on the inhospitable planet Master. To survive its harsh climate, a select few of the most-highly trained constructed larger bodies called "Transtectors," to which they connected as heads.

When a group of rebellious Headmasters led by Zarak join with Galvatron's Decepticons in an attack on Cybertron, the Autobot Headmasters, led by Fortress return to their home planet to aid in its defense. Vector Sigma, the mega-computer at the planet's heart, begins destabilizing, resulting in Optimus Prime sacrificing himself to save Cybertron. However, a bomb attack instigated by Zarak turns Cybertron into a burnt-out, inhospitable husk. Rodimus Prime departs to search for a new planet for the Transformers to live on, leaving Fortress in command, operating from the planet Athenia. Meanwhile, Zarak replaces Galvatron - who had vanished in the explosion - as Decepticon leader, constructing a personal Transtector so that he can battle Fortress's own giant form, Fortress Maximus, and redubbing himself Scorponok.

Although populated mainly with new characters, The Headmasters did continue to feature characters from all previous seasons, including new versions of Soundwave and Blaster, rebuilt after a duel that destroyed them both as Soundblaster and Twincast. Human Daniel Witwicky and his young Autobot friend Wheelie also played major roles in the series, serving as the youthful characters for the audience to identify with. More new characters continued to pour in when Galvatron returned to leadership and the Decepticons embarked on a space voyage, ransacking planets in a chain of stories that introduced the Horrorcons and Autobot and Decepticon Clones. The return to Earth was no less momentous, as the Decepticon ninja six-changer Sixshot killed Ultra Magnus, and the Autobot Headmasters finished off Galvatron. When the Decepticons then returned to Master, refugees from the planet were caught in a plasma bomb accident that fused them to the arms of several Autobots and Decepticons, creating the Targetmasters, and in a final move, Scorponok attempted the destruction of Earth, only to be foiled, thanks in part to a traitorous Sixshot.

Never professionally released in the United States, The Headmasters was dubbed into English in Hong Kong for broadcast on the Malaysian TV channel, RTM 1, and later the Singapore satellite station, STAR TV, where it attained greater fame, leading it to often be referred to as the "StarTV dub". The dub is, however, infamous for its poor quality, full of mistranslations and incorrect names, clearly the work of a small group of individuals (literally, less than half-a-dozen actors fill every role) with little knowledge of the material. This dub has seen some DVD releases in the United Kingdom and Australia, and the entire series was released in a dual-language format in 2005.

On July 5, 2011, Shout! Factory (publishers of G1 of DVD) released the Headmasters series on DVD for the US and Canada markets but the "StarTV" dub wasn't included as per Hasbro's request.

=== Transformers: Super-God Masterforce ===
The second of the Japanese-exclusive animated series, 1988's Transformers: Super-God Masterforce takes place some years after The Headmasters, introducing the Powermasters and Pretenders to Japanese fiction in ways even more different from their portrayal in the west than those of the Headmasters before them.

With the departure of the Autobots and Decepticons from Earth at the end of The Headmasters, a small group of Autobots remained to guard the planet, having hidden amongst mankind for thousands of years thanks to their "Pretender" powers, which allowed them to shrink down and adopt the forms of human beings. However, the sudden re-appearance of their formerly-defeated Decepticon counterparts, now in the service of the mysterious energy entity Devil Z, means that the Autobots must drop their disguises and return to battle once more. As the battle escalates, human beings themselves take sides, and, imbued with the power of the "Masterforce", merge with Transtectors sent to Earth by the Autobots in space to become Transformers themselves as the "Headmaster Juniors". But the Decepticons have Headmaster Juniors of their own, and as the conflict continues, events converge on the creation of the Godmasters.

The Godmasters are the Japanese version of the Powermasters, with human beings transforming into engines and combining with Transtectors to transform into robots capable of wielding "Chokon Power", the primal energy of life. Most notably, their ranks include Ginrai, a character based on the Powermaster version of Optimus Prime, reinvented as a Japanese trucker, and the Japanese-exclusive character, Decepticon ambassador of destruction Overlord.

Running to 42 episodes, Super-God Masterforce had six additional clip episodes made after the fact for video release, one of which, serving as an overview of the series, was selected to be broadcast as the 43rd and final episode of the series. The 42 main episodes received the same dub treatment as The Headmasters, but the dubbed version of the series was not included on the UK DVD release of the series in July 2006. The Australian version includes the "StarTV" dub on a few early and late episodes in the series.

=== Transformers: Victory ===
Taking place in an unspecified amount of time after the events of Super-God Masterforce (there is a common misconception that the series takes place in 2025), 1989's Transformers: Victory is the third Japanese-exclusive series, the final complete Generation 1 cartoon. Led by their new Supreme Commander Star Saber, the Autobots battle the Decepticons under the command of Deszaras for control of the galaxy's resources.

In contrast to The Headmasters and Super-God Masterforce, both of which had an over-arcing plot direction, the majority of Victory is directionless, returning to the episodic adventure tradition of the original American series which culminates in the much-threatened attack of Deszaras's planet-destroying fortress. In another difference, the characters and toys of Victory are predominantly unique to Japan, and those that are not are remoulded in unique, distinguishing ways - the series debuts the Brainmasters, Brestforce and Multiforce, all new toys, as well as the Dinoforce, remoulded versions of the American Monster Pretenders. Micromasters also make their debut in Victory.

Of the 38 episodes of Victory broadcast, six are clip episodes containing no new footage, leaving 32 main episodes, which comprise the DVD collection released in the United Kingdom in September 2006. Six further clip episodes were produced for video, taking the total to 44. Victory also received the "StarTV dub" treatment - when the three Japanese series were broadcast on StarTV, it was under the umbrella title of "Transformers Takara", and all three were branded with Victory's opening sequence. The dub was not released on DVD in the UK either. The Australian release includes the "StarTV" dub for the entire Victory series.

=== Transformers: Zone ===
Originally intended to be a full-length direct-to-video (OVA) series, 1990s Transformers: Zone was cancelled after only one episode, making it the last Generation 1 animated project. Following on from Victory, the mysterious three-faced insectoid being, Violenjiger dispatches the nine "Great Decepticon Generals" - Devastator, Menasor, Bruticus, Trypticon, Predaking, Abominus, King Poseidon, Overlord and BlackZarak - to acquire "Zone Energy", destroying the planet Feminia to obtain the world's store. Caught in the destruction of the planet, Star Saber is rescued by Dai Atlas, who then repels an attack by the Decepticons, and is appointed the new Autobot commander at the conclusion of the episode.

The cast of Zone is heavily composed of Micromasters, who also made up much of the toyline. Dai Atlas is a "Powered Master", so named for his motorized gimmick, as is his combining partner Sonic Bomber - the toyline also featured another partner for them, Roadfire, who was not in the episode. The solitary Decepticons in the toyline were the Race Car Patrol, and Metrotitan, a redeco of the Autobot city Metroplex, neither of whom appeared in animated form. They absent parties did go on to appear, however, in the pages of the Japanese publication, TV Magazine - this monthly magazine had always included Transformers manga and "story pages" (splash page illustrations and prose text) from the beginning, and although no manga was released for Zone (barring a single chapter available through mail-away which simply re-told the episode), its tale was completed through the story pages.

These story pages were also used to provide supporting fiction for the remaining two years' worth of toylines - 1991's Battlestars: Return of Convoy and 1992's Operation: Combination.

Zone is included as a bonus feature on the last disc of the Australian release of Victory with Japanese audio and English subtitles.

== Transformers: Generation 2 ==
When the Transformers: Generation 2 toyline fully launched in 1993, it began with a small collection of original Generation 1 toys, redecoed in various ways, and equipped with ostentatious new gimmicks such as electronic sound boxes and large, firing missile launchers. Although the toyline itself would grow to include many brand new figures, and the comic book which accompanied it was a continuation of Marvel's Generation 1 title, the Generation 2 animated series stuck very closely to the toyline's opening cascade of "rehashed G1." Around fifty Generation 1 episodes from seasons 1 to 3 of The Transformers were chosen and, as the show's narrator proudly proclaimed, "computer-enhanced" with the "Cyber-Net Space-Cube" - a gimmick that essentially consisted of inserting new, computer-generated borders and scene-changes into the existing episodes. CGI clips from toy commercials served to make up the show's opening sequence and commercial bumpers, while the episodes themselves were shown in no particular order.

== Beast Era ==
Series	Season	Episodes	First aired	Last aired	Network	Status
Beast Wars: Transformers	1	26	September 16, 1996	April 1, 1997	Syndication	Released
Beast Wars: Transformers	2	13	October 26, 1997	March 13, 1998	Syndication	Released
Beast Wars: Transformers	3	13	October 25, 1998	March 7, 1999	Syndication	Released
Beast Wars II: Super Life-Form Transformers	1	43	April 1, 1998	January 27, 1999	TV Tokyo	Released
Super Life-Form Transformers: Beast Wars Neo	1	35	February 3, 1999	September 29, 1999	TV Tokyo	Released
Beast Machines: Transformers	1	13	September 18, 1999	December 18, 1999	Fox Kids	Released
Beast Machines: Transformers	2	13	August 5, 2000	November 18, 2000	Fox Kids	Released

=== Beast Wars: Transformers ===
After the unremarkable performance of the Generation 2 line, Hasbro aimed to completely re-work the Transformers premise; the result was Beast Wars: Transformers, which featured robots with familiar names and organic beast modes. As per the original toy packaging bios and mini-comic, the intention was originally to have the series be a direct continuation of the adventures of the "Generation 1" Transformers, but that would soon change with the advent of the animated series. Produced by Canadian animation house Mainframe Entertainment, the animated show was unlike any Transformers cartoons before it, both visually and in terms of story. With Larry DiTillio and Bob Forward at the helm as story editors, it was planned for the show to start afresh, with no ties to anything that had gone before, but the off-handed reference to the "Great War" included in the first episode set the internet fandom ablaze. DiTillio and Forward became occasional posters on the alt.toys.transformers newsgroup, and through this back-and-forth interaction with fans, plus their own research of previous Transformers fiction, the Beast Wars animated series soon began to grow, establishing its place as the future - and past - of the larger Generation 1 timeline.

Running to 26 episodes, 1996's first season of Beast Wars began with an unintentional parallel to the original animated series, introducing the viewers to Maximal Optimus Primal, Predacon Megatron and their crews as their ships crashed onto an alien planet, where they warred over the energon they found there. While mostly a scattershot affair of episodic stories, the first season of Beast Wars focused heavily on characterisation, endowing its cast with consistent, developing personalities and naturalistic voice acting that brought the show to life. Additionally, amidst the one-shot adventures, a plot thread began to grow involving a race of mysterious aliens who were conducting experiments on the planet that occasionally intersected with the Beast Warriors' stories. This eventually culminated in a two-part conclusion to the season, ending on a cliffhanger that led into 1997's 13-episode season. Many of the characters were upgraded into new "Transmetal" forms, and the conflict reached a new level with an exceptionally tightly plotted story arc that included the revelation that the planet was Earth, the death of Dinobot and more alien conflicts. Story elements laid through the season once again came to a head with a three-part conclusion that firmly tied Beast Wars to the Generation 1 timeline, featuring guest appearances from Transformers of that era and displaying that the Beast Warriors came from their future, and were currently in the prehistoric past. This link proved key to the third and final season in 1998, running to another 13 episodes, in which the Maximals had to defend their past and future against Megatron's attempts to alter history. Longtime Transformers comic scribe Simon Furman was brought on board to script the final episode, which concluded with the end of the Beast Wars, and the Maximal's departure for Cybertron.

Although controversial among fans in its early days due to its complete re-imagining of the Transformers concept, today, it is not uncommon to find long-time Transformers fans - even those who have grown up with the franchise since 1984 - who consider Beast Wars to be their favorite Transformers series.

=== Beast Wars II ===
Just as with the Generation 1 timeline, Japan was quick to get in on the act when Beast Wars took off. The first season of the North American animated series was imported and dubbed with an increase in humor, under the title of Beast Wars: Super Lifeform Transformers, but due to the short length of the second season, it proved necessary to wait until both it and the third season were completed before any more could be broadcast. In order to fill the ensuing gap, 1997 debuted the Japanese-original cel-animated series, the 43-episode Beast Wars II (also known as Beast Wars Second or Beast Wars The Second). The series featured an entirely new cast of Maximals and Predacons - led by Lio Convoy and Galvatron, respectively - fighting on the planet Gaia - a future Earth, devastated by the power of the energy source the two factions seek, Angolmois energy.

Although largely looked down upon for its very light-hearted approach when compared to the darker North American series, Beast Wars II proved successful enough to spawn a theatrical movie, consisting of three "acts". The first act was a recap of the original Beast Wars television show up to that point, while the second was the undubbed, English-language episode, "Bad Spark", from the show's second season, to serve as a showcase for the upcoming release of the season in Japan. The third act was Lio Convoy, Close Call!, a new, original story that saw Optimus Primal pulled forward in time to team up with Lio Convoy to stop the monstrous Majin Zarak.

=== Beast Wars Neo ===
Even after the conclusion of Beast Wars II, there was still some time to go before the North American series had generated enough episodes to be aired in Japan, and the 35-episode Beast Wars Neo was produced to fill the 1998 gap. Still cel-animated and ostensibly even more light-hearted than Beast Wars II, this series introduced Big Convoy and Magmatron, new Maximal and Predacon leaders, the former in search of the missing Lio Convoy, the latter questing for the capsule that Lio Convoy had sealed the Angolmois Energy into at the conclusion of the previous series. Beast Wars Neo is particularly notable for one reason - it features the first return of Unicron to animated continuity for a decade. In the course of the series, Angolmois Energy is revealed to be Unicron's life-force, and the series leads to his attempt to transfer it into Cybertron, that it may become his new body.

With the end of Beast Wars Neo, the third season of the North American series had been completed, and it was subsequently combined with the second season and dubbed for Japanese release as Beast Wars Metals.

=== Beast Machines ===
Beast Machines was the only Transformers animated series to be fully plotted from start to finish by Marty Isenberg and Robert N. Skir, writers unfamiliar with Transformers lore who sought to produce the series as, in Skir's words, a "religious epic novel for television". The series tackled the heavy philosophical concept of what it meant to live in an increasingly technological society, running to 26 episodes over two seasons, though in its native Canada, the show was aired simply in one long 26-episode run.

As Beast Machines begins, viewers rejoin Optimus Primal and his Maximals as they return to Cybertron, amnesiac and unable to recall how they got there, only to discover that the planet is now under Megatron's rule, its cities deserted, its occupants stripped of their sparks. An encounter with the ancient Cybertronian computer, the Oracle, sees them reformatted into new technorganic bodies that blend their mechanical natures with the organic material they acquired on Earth, and as the story of the show develops, an organic past to Cybertron is steadily revealed, as is the story of the Maximal's missing memories and friends. Influences from the original Transformers began to creep into the show as they had with Beast Wars before it, until more obscure concepts such as the key to Vector Sigma and the Plasma Energy Chamber played major roles in the series, each one exemplifying one of the mantras espoused - Primal's dedication to seeing the organic flourish, and Megatron's desire for unfeeling, unthinking technological perfection. The clash between these two powers marked the end of the first season, and served to provide Primal with the revelation that drove the second - that he had been wrong, and that the Oracle desired not the domination of one power over the other, but a balance between the organic and the technological. The second season of the show dove headlong into the storyline, with Megatron body-swapping repeatedly, and the concept of the show allowing for such left-field creations as an entirely organic Transformer that changed from beast to beast, and a Maximal who transformed into a plant. The series concluded with a drawn-out battle between Primal and Megatron, which ultimately concluded with their deaths, allowing the planet-wide reformatting of Cybertron into a technorganic paradise.

Beast Machines was not exported to Japan for several years, finally reaching the country in 2004 under the title of Beast Wars Returns.

== Transformers: Robots in Disguise (2000 series) ==
After the conclusion of Beast Wars Metals, it was necessary for Takara to once again produce an original Transformers animated series and toyline, as Beast Machines had not yet amassed enough episodes to make importing it viable. To that end, the new cel-animated series Transformers: Car Robots (occasionally referred to by the misnomer, Transformers 2000) was produced for broadcast in Japan for 2000. The series, however, ultimately proved duly unsuccessful (to the extent that there was no Transformers animated series broadcast in Japan in 2001) and following both the conclusion of it and the second season of Beast Machines, Takara and Hasbro opted to co-produce the next series for the first time. With this decision made, Hasbro scrapped their plans for the Transtech series, and - rather than go a year without Transformers, as Takara had chosen to do - opted to import Car Robots for the 2001 year.

Renamed Transformers: Robots in Disguise (regularly referred to with the acronym of RiD by fans) the series stands alone, unconnected to any of the previous continuities as a complete, self-contained universe. Conceptually, the show united ideas from across the G1 and Beast eras by pitting the vehicular Autobots, led by Optimus Prime, against the bestial Predacons, led by Megatron, and through the inclusion of classic concepts such as Headmaster and combining technology, dubbed into English by Saban Entertainment, many fan-friendly references to the previous continuities were also added. The first story arc of the series is a series of episodic adventures introducing the majority of the cast - like the original animated series, it was very Autobot-heavy, with most characters being newly designed (bar the Spy Changers, repainted versions of Generation 2 figures, and Tow-Line and Skid-Z, repainted Machine Wars toys), while on the Predacon side, only Megatron was a new mould, with his troops being repaints of Beast Wars Transmetal 2 toys. The trend continued into the second story arc, which introduced RiD's version of the Decepticons - redecos of the G1 Combaticons and G2 "Laser Optimus Prime" toy - and Optimus Prime's bitter brother, Ultra Magnus. This led smoothly into the third and final arc of the show, which saw Magnus and Prime merge into Omega Prime, and Decepticon leader Scourge began his plot to wrest the power of the ancient battle station, Fortress Maximus, away from both Megatron and the Autobots.

Its airing schedule heavily disrupted by 9/11, Robots in Disguise had to be re-edited in several ways for content, and several of its episodes aired out of order, or not at all in America. Although initially derided by some fans for its especially light-hearted, joke-filled nature, demand is high for the series to be released on DVD in North America, although available in the United Kingdom, it has yet to see a release in America due to the Walt Disney Company's acquisition of Saban and its products.

== Unicron Trilogy ==
Series	Season	Episodes	First aired	Last aired	Network	Status
Transformers: Armada	1	52	August 23, 2002	December 26, 2003	TV Tokyo (Japan); Cartoon Network (United States)	Released
Transformers: Energon	1	51	January 9, 2004	December 24, 2004	TV Tokyo (Japan); Cartoon Network (United States)	Released
Transformers: Cybertron	1	52	January 8, 2005	December 31, 2005	TV Tokyo (Japan); Cartoon Network (United States)	Released

The "Unicron Trilogy" is so-named for the major role that the chaos bringer Unicron plays in each of the three series that comprise it. Taking place over a twenty-year span from 2010 to 2030, the trilogy is significant for being a co-production between Hasbro and Takara; the Japanese production team actually wanted to set the series in the Generation 1 continuity, post-"The Rebirth", but this was vetoed by Hasbro's head Transformers design director, Aaron Archer, in favour of completely rebooting the Transformers universe and introducing a brand new continuity for the second time (the first being Robots in Disguise). Archer crafted the basic story outline of each of the three lines, with the anime themselves then being written and animated in Japan, but in practice, the Japanese studios did not always follow Archer's design. While each series ran for eighteen months in Hasbro markets, lasting from mid-2002 through 2007, the three were annual affairs in Japan, running from January to December in 2003, 2004 and 2005.

=== Transformers: Armada ===
Launched in the summer of 2002, Transformers: Armada was the first series co-produced between Hasbro and Takara, with the intention of creating a toyline for simultaneous release in both North America and Japan. It was released in Japan six months later in January 2003, where it was known as Transformers: Micron Legend. The heavily promoted series was an attempt to re-introduce Transformers to the children of the time, and featured a particularly large number of additional merchandise such as puzzles, games, cards, candy and a tie-in PlayStation 2 video game.

In addition to drawing on and re-imagining familiar elements from Generation 1, such as the Matrix of Leadership, Armada's defining trait was the introduction of a third faction of Transformers - the diminutive robots known as Mini-Cons (the eponymous "Microns" in Japan). Mini-Cons can "powerlink" to larger Transformers, increasing their powers, and consequently became a sought-after commodity in the war between the Autobots and Decepticons. Eventually, however, the Mini-Cons fled Cybertron in a starship, which warped into the Solar System and crashed on Earth. The series then begins in the year 2010, when three teenagers - Rad, Carlos and Alexis - find and reactivate the buried hulk of the Mini-Con ship, sending out a signal that brings Optimus Prime, Megatron and their troops to Earth.

The Autobots and Decepticons begin scouring the planet to find the stasis panels containing the dormant Mini-Cons, thought to be located in Hellnoville, but soon, the existence of three powerful weapons - each formed from the fusion of three separate Mini-Cons - comes to light. Thanks to the schemes of the mysterious, allegiance-shifting Sideways, the weapons are formed and constantly shift hands, until, through manipulation of the self-doubting Starscream, all three are finally within Decepticon hands. Through the power of these weapons, the ancient evil, Unicron is reawakened, as the mysteries of the show, the origins of the Mini-Cons and the nature of the Transformers' war are explored in a final story arc entitled "The Unicron Battles."

The English-language version of Armada is infamous for having been produced in haste for several reasons, most prominently the fact that Cartoon Network would not sign off on the series without a certain number of episodes already completed. To meet this demand, the dubbing studio was forced to work with only partially complete episodes, with animation of a wildly varying quality, containing many errors that were later corrected for the Japanese broadcast. Additionally, there was rarely even enough time to produce more than a first draft of the translated script, leading to many errors in translation making it into the finished product, including incorrect character names, flat, transliterated speech, and at times, utterly nonsensical dialogue that did not match the action onscreen.

A companion comic book was included with the Japanese DVD releases of the series titled Linkage, which focused on the side story of a group of Mini-Cons whose adventures happened concurrently with the animated series. The comic takes the time to flesh out some unexplained plot points from the series, as well as providing an in-depth explanation on the nature of Mini-Cons.

=== Transformers: Energon ===
Whatever the technical failings of the Armada animated series, the line succeeded in its goal of reinvigorating the Transformers brand and reacquiring the recognisability the series had enjoyed in the Generation 1 heyday. Consequently, the process was repeated, and Hasbro and Takara debuted Transformers: Energon at the beginning of 2004.

Picking up ten years after the end of Armada, Energon focuses on the quest for the titular energy-rich mineral, the Transformers' power source. The Autobots and Decepticons, allied since the conclusion of Armada, have entered into an alliance with humankind in order to mine for energon on Earth, and now operate out of massive "Cybertron Cities" in strategic locations around the world. But, out in the void of space, the damaged, deactivated body of Unicron now serves the staging base of the deranged alien being Alpha Q, who sends armies of robotic Terrorcons to steal Energon for his own purposes. But those purposes are not as sinister as they seem, and soon pale in comparison to the evil of the resurrected Megatron.

The Autobots of Energon are empowered with the "Spark of Combination", which allows them to link their bodies together in various configurations - a power that gives the series its Japanese title, Transformers: Superlink - while the Decepticons possess "hyper modes" with excesses of weaponry. The series also introduces the aforementioned Terrorcons, and their Autobot counterparts the Omnicons, robots with the ability to handle and shape energon into power-enhancing stars and weapons such as spears and axes.

=== Transformers: Cybertron ===
Transformers: Cybertron is the anomaly of the Unicron Trilogy universe. Debuting in Japan in January 2005, under the title Transformers: Galaxy Force, the series was intended by its Japanese producers to be yet another complete reboot to the timeline, beginning yet another continuity from the beginning with no connections to Armada or Energon. It would not be until mid-2005, when Energon completed its run, that Hasbro would release Cybertron into their markets, modifying the show and using other media to establish its place in continuity (see the show's own article for more details). Concluding in Japan at the end of 2005, the series ran throughout 2006 in Hasbro markets, and once again, Takara had no animated product on Japanese screens for that year.

The story of Cybertron centres on a gigantic black hole, created by the destruction of Unicron at the conclusion of Energon, which threatens to consume Cybertron and the rest of the universe. This danger brings the ancient Transformer, Vector Prime, back to Cybertron, where he sets the Autobots on a quest for the four Cyber Planet Keys, legendary artifacts of power that can seal the black hole. The keys, however, are scattered on planets throughout the galaxy, and the Autobots must now race from world to world to acquire their power before the Decepticons. Aided with new "Cyber Key Powers" of their own, the Transformers makes allies and enemies on each different world they visit, from the racing-obsessed Velocitron to the bestial Jungle Planet and beyond, on an adventure that has its roots in the ancient past, and sculpts a new future for Cybertron.

Cybertron's English language adaptation flouts Unicron Trilogy convention by being competently produced. More than simply a translation of the Japanese version, Cybertron features large amounts of new dialogue, be it to form connections with Armada and Energon, to pay homage to many classic Generation 1 quotes (several lines from The Transformers: The Movie are re-used, in particular, and there are also a few quotes and references to the Beast Era), or simply to fill many prolonged sequences of silence in the Japanese version, an artefact of the show's excessive use of stock footage transformation, combination and transportation sequences.

== Transformers: Animated ==
Formerly known by the working title, Transformers: Heroes, Transformers: Animated debuted December 26, 2007, on Cartoon Network, and represents yet another fresh start for the animated Transformers universe, albeit one that draws inspiration from many of its antecedents, including, for the first time, elements drawn from the 2007 live-action film. Opening in a manner similar to Beast Wars, the series takes place centuries after the end of the Autobot-Decepticon war, and centers on a small group of Autobots voyaging through space on missions. The group is a Space Bridge repair crew led by academy washout Optimus Prime, who stumble across the legendary life-giving Allspark on a routine mission, drawing the attention of the long-exiled Decepticons under the command of Megatron. As a result of the ensuing battle, Megatron and the Autobots crash land on Earth, while the other Decepticons are scattered through space. Megatron's remains are discovered by the young scientist Isaac Sumdac, who reverse-engineers his Cybertronian technology to create massive leaps in Earth machinery, transforming the planet into a technological utopia over the course of the following fifty years. The Autobots spend these years in stasis, but when they are awakened as a result of one of Sumdac's experiments in techno-organic fusion going berserk, they publicly save the day, befriend Sumdac's daughter Sari (who later reveals to be a robot herself), and quickly establish themselves as a force for justice on Earth.

The core Autobot team is led by Optimus Prime (voiced by David Kaye) and consists of the speedy, wise-cracking Bumblebee; gentle giant Bulkhead; aged, ornery medic Ratchet; and loner ninja Prowl. Early antagonists in the series are largely superhuman villains, some of whom will obtain powers through Transformer technology, with the scattered Decepticons (Starscream, Blackarachnia, Lugnut, and Blitzwing) periodically arriving on Earth in their search for Megatron and the Allspark. The series also features many other additional Transformers characters in guest appearances and recurring roles, including Arcee, Ironhide, bounty hunter Lockdown, Earth machines brought to life by the Allspark such as the Dinobots, the Constructicons, and Wreck-Gar, and the Autobot Cybertron Elite Guard, including Ultra Magnus (Supreme Commander of the Autobots), Sentinel Prime, Blurr, and Jazz.

The show's supervising director is Matt Youngberg (Teen Titans, The Batman), with Cartoon Network vice-president Sam Register as executive producer and Vincent Aniceto as line producer. Beast Machines writer Marty Isenberg returned to Transformers as the story editor/head writer for the series. The series is voice-directed by Susan Blu, the original voice of G1 Arcee, who will be voicing the character again in this series. Art director and lead character designer Derrick J. Wyatt (Teen Titans, Legion of Super Heroes) created a "brand new look" unlike anything seen in Transformers before. The series is distributed internationally by Entertainment Rights.

== Aligned continuity ==
Series	Season	Episodes	First aired	Last aired	Network	Showrunner(s)	Status
Transformers: Prime	1	26	November 29, 2010	October 15, 2011	The Hub / Hub Network	Roberto Orci, Alex Kurtzman, Duane Capizzi, and Jeff Kline	Released
Transformers: Prime	2	26	February 18, 2012	November 2, 2012	The Hub / Hub Network	Roberto Orci, Alex Kurtzman, Duane Capizzi, and Jeff Kline	Released
Transformers: Prime	3	13	March 22, 2013	July 26, 2013	The Hub / Hub Network	Roberto Orci, Alex Kurtzman, Duane Capizzi, and Jeff Kline	Released
Transformers: Rescue Bots	1	26	February 18, 2012	August 18, 2012	The Hub / Hub Network	Nicole Dubuc, Brian Hohlfeld, Jeff Kline	Released
Transformers: Rescue Bots	2	24	March 1, 2014	August 2, 2014	The Hub / Hub Network	Nicole Dubuc, Brian Hohlfeld, Jeff Kline	Released
Transformers: Rescue Bots	3	28	November 1, 2014	June 13, 2015	Discovery Family	Nicole Dubuc, Brian Hohlfeld, Jeff Kline	Released
Transformers: Rescue Bots	4	26	April 23, 2016	October 22, 2016	Discovery Family	Nicole Dubuc, Brian Hohlfeld, Jeff Kline	Released
Transformers Go!	1	10	July 1, 2013	April 1, 2014	OVA	Toshifumi Kawase	Released
Transformers: Robots in Disguise	1	26	March 14, 2015	September 12, 2015	Cartoon Network	Adam Beechen, Duane Capizzi, Jeff Kline	Released
Transformers: Robots in Disguise	2	13	February 20, 2016	May 14, 2016	Cartoon Network	Adam Beechen, Duane Capizzi, Jeff Kline	Released
Transformers: Robots in Disguise	Miniseries	6	October 22, 2016	December 3, 2016	Cartoon Network	Adam Beechen, Duane Capizzi, Jeff Kline	Released
Transformers: Robots in Disguise	3	26	April 29, 2017	November 11, 2017	Cartoon Network	Adam Beechen, Duane Capizzi, Jeff Kline	Released
Transformers: Rescue Bots Academy	1	52	January 5, 2019	November 30, 2019	Discovery Family	Nicole Dubuc	Released
Transformers: Rescue Bots Academy	2	52	March 21, 2020	June 5, 2021	Discovery Family	Nicole Dubuc	Released

=== Transformers: Prime (2010–2013) ===
Transformers: Prime is a CGI-based series that aired on The Hub television network from November 29, 2010, to July 26, 2013, with Peter Cullen and Frank Welker once again providing the voices of Optimus Prime and Megatron respectively. The series begins three years after the Autobot's last confrontation with the Decepticons. After Cybertron became uninhabitable due to the war between the Autobots and Decepticons, the Autobots scattered across the Universe. Optimus Prime is on Earth with a small group of Autobots that call themselves Team Prime.

While the Autobot's presence is not known among the general population, the United States government is aware of their presence and cooperates with them. A special agent named William Fowler often communicates with the Autobots directly. Megatron discovers that Optimus is on Earth and seeks him out to destroy him. Megatron also realises that Earth is rich with sources of Energon, and the Autobots strive to stop him from destroying Earth as he searches for these sources. Energon is the emanation of Primus, the creator of the Transformers, and it functions in transformers as blood does in humans. Dark Energon, on the other hand, is a corrupted form of energon and the blood of Unicron the Chaos-Bringer, Primus's fallen brother. Primus makes up the core of Cybertron, and it is eventually revealed that Unicron makes up the Earth's core. Megatron injects himself with Dark energon in order to gain control over it and become stronger. Dark energon weakens and corrupts transformers, and it can be used to raise the dead, which Megatron does in the beginning of the series.

In the very beginning of the series, three teenagers named Jack, Miko and Rafael witness the Autobots and Decepticons in action. Now that they are involved, the Autobots take it upon themselves to protect them. These teenagers become friends to the Autobots, as well as an asset, providing them with information about human life and Earth. They become involved in many of the Autobots' adventures.

The series concluded with the television film Transformers Prime Beast Hunters: Predacons Rising, on October 4, 2013.

=== Transformers: Rescue Bots (2011–2016) ===
Transformers: Rescue Bots is an animated series airing on The Hub and aimed at a younger generation of Transformers fans. It is part of the same continuity as Transformers: Prime. The series focuses on a squad of Rescue Bots, Autobots who specialized in rescue missions back on Cybertron. Having left Cybertron on a patrol ship prior to the war between Autobots and Decepticons, they eventually arrive on Earth and meet Optimus Prime, who pairs them up with the Burns family of the fictional island Griffin Rock. The Rescue Bots are tasked with helping protect the citizens of Griffin Rock while learning from them and maintaining their cover as highly sophisticated-but nonsentient-transforming robots. The Burns serve as their partners in this endeavor, with each Rescue Bot teaming up with an adult Burns family member while the youngest Burns, Cody, helps the Bots learn more about Earth culture. While they are usually called upon to defend Griffin Rock and its citizens from man-made and natural disasters, the Rescue Bots occasionally engage human villains eager to exploit their advanced technology.

At four seasons and 104 episodes, it is the longest-running Transformers series, surpassing the record set by the original animated series at 98 episodes.

=== Transformers Go! (2013–2014) ===
Transformers Go! is a Japanese exclusive sequel to Transformers: Prime - Beast Hunters. There are two chapters: Samurai and Shinobi. Both, however, share the same basic plot. Two humans, one descended from a line of samurai and one from ninjas, encounter the Predacons who are attempting to steal the legendiscs-powerful ancient artifacts-to revive their leader, Dragotron. However, the discs summon two teams of Autobot Swordbots, each corresponding to the human partner's ancestry. From then on, with the help of Optimus Prime, they combat the Predacons while attempting to retrieve all the legendiscs.

=== Transformers: Robots in Disguise (2015–2017) ===
Transformers: Robots in Disguise is a sequel series to Transformers: Prime, and it ran from March 14, 2015, to November 11, 2017. Years after the conclusion of Transformers: Prime, Bumblebee leads his own team of Autobots, including Sideswipe, a Mini-Con named Fixit, the Dinobot Grimlock and a female Elite Guard cadet named Strongarm. The Autobots are summoned back to Earth to defend it from a new faction of Decepticons.

=== Transformers: Rescue Bots Academy (2018–2021) ===
Transformers: Rescue Bots Academy is the sequel series to Transformers: Rescue Bots, aimed at a younger audience than its predecessor. After a sneak peek on December 8, 2018, the series officially premiered on January 8, 2019, on Discovery Family.

The series focuses on Hot Shot, Whirl, Hoist, Medix and Wedge, five young Cybertronians who enroll as the first students of the Rescue Bots Training Center, where they learn from the now-famous original Rescue Bots how to respond in emergency situations and become true heroes.

== Mystery of Convoy ==
In collaboration with the 30th anniversary of Transfomers, as well as the 35th anniversary of Choro-Q, a flash anime adaptation of the 1985 game Transformers: Mystery of Convoy, produced by DLE, titled Q Transformers: Mystery of Convoy Returns (キュートランスフォーマー 帰ってきたコンボイの謎, Kyū Toransufōmā Kaettekita Konboi no Nazo), began airing in Japan on January 6, 2015. The opening theme is "physical" by Oldcodex. A second season titled Q Transformers: The Road to Additional Popularity (キュートランスフォーマー さらなる人気者への道, Kyū Toransufōmā Saranaru Ninkimono e no Michi) premiered in Japan on July 6, 2015. The ending themes of the second season are "Destiny ~ 400 Man-nen Mae Kara Itoshi teru" (~DESTINY～400万年前から愛してる～) by Yoshimasa Hosoya and "SHOCK ~ Kono Omoi wa Hikari no Yōni ~" (SHOCK～この想いは光のように～) by Kaito Ishikawa.

== Transformers: Prime Wars Trilogy ==
=== Transformers: Combiner Wars (2016 series) ===
Transformers: Combiner Wars is an animated web series, based on the G1-centric toyline of the same name, and created by Machinima, Inc. in partnership with Hasbro for the go90 streaming media format from Verizon. It aired from August 2, 2016, to September 20, 2016.

=== Transformers: Titans Return (2017 series) ===
Like Combiner Wars before it, Titans Return is also an Internet-based series for go90, supporting the Titans Return toyline. It aired from November 14, 2017, to January 9, 2018, and features Peter Cullen and Judd Nelson as Optimus Prime and Hot Rod, reprising their respective characters from The Transformers 30 years previous.

=== Transformers: Power of the Primes (2018 series) ===
Like Combiner Wars and Titans Return, Power of the Primes is also an Internet-based series for go90 and is also the final installment of the Prime Wars Trilogy, supporting the Power of the Primes toyline. It aired from May 1, 2018, to July 3, 2018.

== Transformers: Cyberverse ==
Debuting in 2018 on Cartoon Network and produced by Boulder Media Limited and Hasbro's Allspark Animation, Transformers: Cyberverse is a series where Bumblebee lost his voicebox and his memory of the special mission given to him by Optimus Prime. With the help of his friend, Windblade, they will encounter challenges to recover Bumblebee's memory.

The seasons are dubbed "Chapters", with the first aired in 2018, the second, subtitled Power of the Spark, aired in 2019–2020 and the third and final chapter, in which the show's title changed into Transformers: Bumblebee: Cyberverse Adventures, was aired in 2020. The series concluded with two extended-length Netflix television final episodes in 2021.

The show uses elements and characters across all eras of the franchise, specifically G1, Animated, Aligned and the live-action films continuities. It is, however, the first stand-alone Transformers show not connected to any larger continuity since Transformers: Animated.

== Transformers: War for Cybertron Trilogy ==
Transformers: War for Cybertron Trilogy is a CGI anime-influenced animation series that was first released on Netflix on July 30, 2020.

F.J. DeSanto, the showrunner of the Prime Wars Trilogy animated series, returns in the same position, alongside writers George Krstic, Gavin Hignight and Brandon M. Easton and voice actors Jake Foushee, Jason Marnocha and Frank Todaro reprising their roles as Optimus Prime, Megatron and Starscream.

Three seasons, dubbed "Chapters", were released, in conjunction with the eponymous toyline: Siege, Earthrise and Kingdom, accumulating to a total of 18 episodes.

== Transformers: BotBots ==
An animated series based on the 2018 BotBots collectable was released. Like the War for Cybertron Trilogy animated series, Transformers: BotBots was released as a Netflix original series, premiering on March 25, 2022. It is the first comedy series of the Transformers franchise, and has minimal ties and references to the wider franchise.

== Transformers: EarthSpark ==
In late 2020, Hasbro announced that a new animated Transformers series was in development for 2022. The series was later officially titled Transformers: EarthSpark and premiered on November 11, 2022, on the Paramount+ streaming service and Nickelodeon and concluded on December 5, 2025.

== Transformers: Cyberworld ==
Transformers: Cyberworld is an ongoing British-American animated web series based on the Transformers toy line by Takara Tomy and Hasbro. It is produced by Omens Studios and Hasbro Entertainment, and debuted on July 12, 2025, on YouTube.
