= Power of the Primes =

2018 American television series

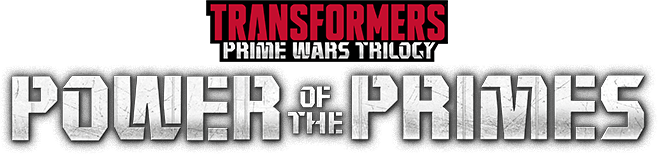
- Type: Action figure
- Company: Hasbro
- Country: United States
- Slogan: Anything is possible and everything is at stake when the power of the Primes is unleashed!
- Official website

Power of the Primes is the third and final installment of the Transformers: Prime Wars Trilogy, a toyline and transmedia series created by Hasbro as part of the Transformers franchise. It consists of the toy line, as well as the animated web series of the same name.

Development of the franchise began in November 2016 with the announcement of an animated web series by Machinima, based on the upcoming toyline. In January 2017, Hasbro held a fan-vote to decide which character would become the next Prime in the franchise. In February, it was decided that Optimus Primal would become the next Prime.

== Development ==
Power of the Primes was first announced on November 29, 2016. Hasbro announced that it would once again partner with Machinima—after having previously worked with them on the animated web series adaptation of Transformers: Combiner Wars—to produce the adaptations for Transformers: Titans Return and Transformers: Power of the Primes. Eric Calderon, showrunner of Combiner Wars, was confirmed to have returned for both Titans Return and Power of the Primes.

In January 2017, Hasbro created a poll allowing fans to vote which Transformer will become the next Prime. The vote occurred in two stages. During the first, fans voted for the leaders of three different personality factions: honor, order, and chaos. Honor was represented by Arcee, Ultra Magnus, and Hound; Order by Megatron, Star Saber, and Shockwave; and Chaos by Thunderwing, Optimus Primal, and an Unknown Evil (Deathsaurus). The winners of the first round were Ultra Magnus, Star Saber and Optimus Primal, advancing into the second round alongside the Unknown Evil as a wildcard. The poll ended a month later on February 18, and Optimus Primal was chosen as the next Prime.

At the 2017 San Diego Comic-Con on July 20, Hasbro revealed during their panel some of the figures of the toyline. The figures shown were those of Liege Maximo, Dreadwind, Blackwing, Starscream, Jazz and Rodimus Prime. During Hasbro's first HasCon fan convention in September, the new Combiner Volcanicus was revealed. The combiner is composed of the five Dinobots: Grimlock, Slug, Sludge, Snarl and Swoop.

=== Controversy ===
In November 2017, a fan noticed that a tiny print found on the vehicle mode of Jazz featured scribbles that, when translated from the Cybertronian alphabet, read out "MAGA", which is an abbreviation for "Make America Great Again", the slogan of both former President Ronald Reagan and then-President Donald Trump. Hasbro soon released a statement that the issue had been investigated and that a vendor had placed the acronym without authorization. The company also clarified that they are addressing the issue with the vendor and that they "do not intend for [their] products to carry political messages, apologiz[ing] to anyone who was offended by this message".

== Animated web series ==
Transformers: Power of the Primes
- Official teaser poster featuring Optimus Primal
- Genre: Science fiction
- Based on: Transformers by Hasbro and Takara Tomy
- Developed by: F. J. DeSanto; Adam Beechen; Jamie Iracleanos
- Written by: F. J. DeSanto; Adam Beechen; Jamie Iracleanos
- Directed by: Yuzo Sato
- Voices of: Gregg Berger; Mark Hamill; Samoa Joe; Jaime King; Ron Perlman; Mikey Way
- Countries of origin: United States; Japan
- Original language: English
- No. of seasons: 1
- No. of episodes: 10

Production
- Running time: 10–12 minutes
- Production companies: Machinima, Inc. Hasbro Studios; Tatsunoko Production

Original release
- Network: go90 (U.S.); Tumblr (worldwide)
- Release: May 1 – July 3, 2018

Related
- Transformers: Titans Return; Transformers: Prime Wars Trilogy

Transformers: Power of the Primes is an animated web series developed by F.J. DeSanto, Adam Beechen and Jamie Iracleanos, and produced by Machinima, Inc. and Hasbro Studios, with the animation provided by Tatsunoko Production. It is the final installment of the Transformers: Prime Wars Trilogy series, being the direct sequel to Transformers: Titans Return. The series premiered on May 1, 2018 in the United States on go90, and on Tumblr internationally.

Power of the Primes is the final Transformers animated series to feature Peter Cullen voicing Optimus Prime due to his death in August 2026.

In the aftermath of the Titans' conflict that concluded with Optimus Prime's death, Megatron and the rest of the Transformers must stand together in order to stop Megatronus from wiping out their species forever. During their search for the Requiem Blaster, more mysteries about Cybertron's past will be uncovered, and a new Prime will be chosen.

=== Casting ===
On January 9, 2018, it was announced that Mark Hamill, who had previously voiced Megatronus in Transformers: Titans Return, would resume his role for Transformers: Power of the Primes. It was also confirmed that Ron Perlman would voice Optimus Primal, after the character was voted by fans to become the next Prime, while Gregg Berger also reprised his role as Grimlock in addition to Volcanicus, the combined robot form of the five Dinobots. Other voice actors include Jaime King, Mikey Way, Peter Cullen, and Samoa Joe. Judd Nelson, Kari Wahlgren and Wil Wheaton also reprised their roles.

==== Voice cast ====
The series features returning actors and newcomers as part of the cast.

- Gregg Berger as Grimlock and Volcanicus
- Peter Cullen as Optimus Prime
- Rob Dyke as Devastator
- Charlie Guzman as Menasor
- Mark Hamill as Megatronus / The Fallen
- Nuufolau Joel "Samoa Joe" Seanoa as Predaking
- Jaime King as Solus Prime
- Jason Marnocha as Megatron
- Judd Nelson as Hot Rod / Rodimus Cron / Rodimus Unicronus and Unicron
- Matthew Patrick as Computron and Swoop
- Ron Perlman as Optimus Primal / Optimal Optimus
- Patrick Seitz as Overlord
- Frank Todaro as Sludge and Starscream
- Abby Trott as Windblade
- Kari Wahlgren as Victorion
- Mikey Way as Snarl
- Wil Wheaton as Perceptor

=== Episodes ===
No. overall	No. in season	Title	Directed by	Written by	Original release date	Prod. code
19	1	"The Swamp"	Yuzo Sato	F.J. DeSanto, Adam Beechen, and Jamie Iracleanos	May 1, 2018	TBA
Megatronus hunts for the Requiem Blaster as we learn about its mysterious past. Elsewhere, Megatron and his team are also searching for the weapon, hoping to get to it first, when they encounter Grimlock and his fellow Dinobots.
20	2	"Volcanicus"	Yuzo Sato	F.J. DeSanto, Adam Beechen, and Jamie Iracleanos	May 8, 2018	TBA
Megatron awakens miles away to find a mysterious structure. Curious, he makes his way there, leaving his team to fend for themselves. Vulnerable without him, the team is on the brink of defeat at the hands of Volcanicus when another threat arrives hoping to destroy them.
21	3	"Without Warning"	Yuzo Sato	F.J. DeSanto, Adam Beechen, and Jamie Iracleanos	May 15, 2018	TBA
Still without Megatron, the team must now fend off both Volcanicus and Predaking. Meanwhile, Megatronus arrives at the Well of Sparks to forge a new device that will help him accomplish his nefarious plan.
22	4	"Primal"	Yuzo Sato	F.J. DeSanto, Adam Beechen, and Jamie Iracleanos	May 22, 2018	TBA
With our heroes cornered, Predaking demands Victorion hand over the Enigma of Combination while unaware that Megatronus took away the Enigma of Combination. Inside the mysterious dome, Megatron finds the Requiem Blaster, but is confronted by a mysterious figure guarding it.
23	5	"Athenaeum Sanctorum"	Yuzo Sato	F.J. DeSanto, Adam Beechen, and Jamie Iracleanos	May 29, 2018	TBA
Hot on the heels of our heroes, Overlord and Rodimus Cron confront the Dinobots and gain vital information as to the teams whereabouts. Meanwhile, the team learns the tragic fate of one of the Thirteen.
24	6	"Countdown"	Yuzo Sato	F.J. DeSanto, Adam Beechen, and Jamie Iracleanos	June 5, 2018	TBA
Overlord and Rodimus Cron finally confront the protagonists, while Optimus Primal makes a tough decision that changes the course of the battle. Alas, having found Megatron, Overlord is determined to get his revenge.
25	7	"Consequences"	Yuzo Sato	F.J. DeSanto, Adam Beechen, and Jamie Iracleanos	June 12, 2018	TBA
Megatron finally figures out Megatronus’ plan, but fears it may be too late to stop him when Megatronus arrives to claim the Requiem Blaster for himself.
26	8	"Collision Course"	Yuzo Sato	F.J. DeSanto, Adam Beechen, and Jamie Iracleanos	June 19, 2018	TBA
With the Requiem Blaster in his possession, Megatronus launches his now completed device, draining the sparks of Transformers everywhere. With their fate at risk, our heroes must fight Megatronus one last time.
27	9	"Megatronus Unleashed"	Yuzo Sato	F.J. DeSanto, Adam Beechen, and Jamie Iracleanos	June 26, 2018	TBA
To save their race, our heroes must destroy Megatronus’ machine, but first they must fend off a possessed Rodimus Cron.
28	10	"Saga's End"	Yuzo Sato	F.J. DeSanto, Adam Beechen, and Jamie Iracleanos	July 3, 2018	TBA
The final battle between Megatronus and the Transformers leads to unforeseen consequences that will have a startling impact on Cybertron and the entire universe.

== Comic book ==
According to John Barber, editor of IDW Publishing, the ongoing Transformers comics published by the company will not feature a crossover event based on Power of the Primes. IDW had previously published crossover events based on Combiner Wars and Titans Return.
