= Transformers: Titans Return =

- Official poster
- Genre: Science fiction Action
- Based on: Transformers by Hasbro and Takara Tomy
- Developed by: Eric S. Calderon; Adam Beechen; F.J. DeSanto
- Written by: Eric S. Calderon; Adam Beechen; F.J. DeSanto
- Directed by: Yuzo Sato
- Voices of: Peter Cullen; Michael Dorn; Jason David Frank; Judd Nelson; Matthew Patrick; Abby Trott; Kari Wahlgren; Wil Wheaton; Tay Zonday
- Countries of origin: United States; Japan
- Original language: English
- No. of seasons: 1
- No. of episodes: 10

Production
- Running time: 11–12 minutes
- Production companies: Machinima, Inc. Hasbro Studios; Tatsunoko Production

Original release
- Network: go90
- Release: November 14, 2017 – January 9, 2018

Related
- Transformers: Combiner Wars; Transformers: Power of the Primes; Transformers: Prime Wars Trilogy

Transformers: Titans Return is an animated web series developed by Eric S. Calderon, Adam Beechen and F.J. DeSanto, and produced by Machinima, Inc. and Hasbro Studios, with the animation handled by Tatsunoko Production. Based on the Transformers franchise, it is the sequel to Transformers: Combiner Wars and the second installment of the Prime Wars Trilogy.

The series premiered in the United States on November 14, 2017 on go90, and was later streamed internationally on YouTube on January 9, 2018.

== Premise ==
After the Combiner Wars ended, Cybertron started to be rebuilt. However, an undead Starscream has been reincarnated as Trypticon, wreaking havoc around him. To combat this menace, Windblade gathers up a ragtag team of Transformers, including Optimus Prime and Megatron, to resurrect an ancient ally. And while some may be forever changed by the events, others may not emerge with their sparks intact.

== Cast ==
For this series, various actors return from Combiner Wars alongside new cast members, including Transformers veterans Peter Cullen, reprising his role as Optimus Prime, and Judd Nelson, reprising his role as Rodimus Prime / Hot Rod from The Transformers: The Movie and Transformers: Animated.

- Peter Cullen as Optimus Prime
- Charlie Guzman as Menasor
- Michael Dorn as Fortress Maximus
- Rob Dyke as Devastator
- Jason David Frank as Emissary
- Mark Hamill as Megatronus / The Fallen
- Jason Marnocha as Megatron
- Lana McKissack as the Mistress of Flame
- Judd Nelson as Rodimus Prime / Hot Rod
- Nolan North as Metroplex
- Matthew Patrick as Computron
- Patrick Seitz as Overlord
- Frank Todaro as Starscream / Trypticon
- Abby Trott as Windblade
- Kari Wahlgren as Victorion
- Wil Wheaton as Perceptor
- Tay Zonday as the Chorus of the Primes

== Episodes ==
The series consists of roughly ten-minute episodes. The first two episodes premiered for the American audience on November 14, 2017, via go90, followed by a weekly release of new episodes every Tuesday. For international viewers, the first two episodes were released on January 9, 2018, on Machinima's official YouTube channel (as well as Hasbro's, but their uploads were since privatized), and all remaining episodes later appeared on YouTube on January 23, 2018.

No. overall	No. in season	Title	Original release date	Prod. code	US viewers (millions)
9	1	"Aftermath and Rebirth"	November 14, 2017	TBA	N/A
As the Transformers recover from the Combiner Wars, Rodimus Prime makes a life changing decision, while Windblade finds herself at odds yet again with Optimus Prime. Unbeknownst to all of them, a new threat awakens in the form of a mysterious and long dormant Titan.
10	2	"Our Heroes Respond"	November 14, 2017	TBA	N/A
The Transformers are forced into action after the gigantic and destructive Titan Trypticon returns to wreak havoc on Cybertron. At the Primal Basilica, Perceptor proposes a daring plan to resurrect an ancient ally, while Mistress of Flame orders an all-out assault on the brutal lizard-like Titan.
11	3	"The Fight Begins"	November 21, 2017	TBA	N/A
Metroplex and Trypticon square off in a massive encounter that will shake Cybertron to its core. Meanwhile, Mistress of Flame reaches out to the newly liberated Hot Rod for help as Perceptor launches the Primal Basilica's defenses.
12	4	"Overlord and Emissary"	November 28, 2017	TBA	N/A
Overwhelmed by the ferocious Trypticon, Metroplex finds help from the smallest of Transformers, Titan Master Emissary. Back at the Primal Basilica, the Mistress of Flame is confronted by a brutal Decepticon who is determined to kill anything standing in the way of his revenge.
13	5	"At the Last Second"	December 5, 2017	TBA	N/A
Megatron uncovers a sinister plan after finding the Mistress of Flame close to death.
14	6	"Desperate Actions"	December 12, 2017	TBA	N/A
While searching for the answers behind the mysterious return of the Titans, Megatron is confronted by the Combiners who are determined to kill him.
15	7	"Run for Our Lives"	December 19, 2017	TBA	N/A
Victorion, now the Ultimate Combiner, is forced to use her new powers to take on Trypticon. Back at the Primal Basillica, Optimus Prime entrusts the Matrix of Leadership to the one person he knows will never betray the Transformers.
16	8	"In Good Hands"	December 26, 2017	TBA	N/A
Trypticon, closing in on the Matrix of Leadership, wages war on Victorion. Awakened by Windblade and Emissary, Fortress Maximus returns to help our heroes before Cybertron is lost forever to Trypticon's destruction.
17	9	"Consumed"	January 2, 2018	TBA	N/A
After rescuing Optimus Prime from certain doom, Fortress Maximus arrives to fight Trypticon. Elsewhere on the battlefield, Windblade forces Megatron to choose a side once and for all. Will Perceptor's dangerous plan work or will life on Cybertron cease to exist once and for all?
18	10	"All Things Must Pass"	January 9, 2018	TBA	N/A
Fueled by the ancient artifacts of the Primes, the unstoppable Trypticon prepares to deliver a final blow to the Transformers. Perceptor's dangerous plan successfully works and Starscream's ghost leaves Trypticon's body. The Enigma of Combination and the Matrix of Leadership reveals a new threat: Megatronus "The Fallen". While Megatron tries to stall the new reformed Megatronus, Optimus and Fortress Maximus try to attack Megatronus leading to Optimus Prime's death by the Fallen. Now the remaining Autobots and Decepticons must trust Megatron to survive. Meanwhile, Overlord and his newest ally the corrupted Rodimus Cron wonder "What is Megatron up to?"

== Sequel ==
Titans Return was followed by a third and final instalment titled Transformers: Power of the Primes, which was released from May 1, to July 3, 2018. Mark Hamill, Ron Perlman, Mikey Way, Jaime King, Gregg Berger, and Samoa Joe lent their voices to Megatronus / The Fallen, Optimus Primal, Snarl, Solus Prime, Grimlock, and Predaking respectively.
