= Transformers: Combiner Wars =

- Genre: Science fiction Action
- Based on: Combiner Wars by Hasbro
- Developed by: Eric S. Calderon; George Krstic; F.J. DeSanto
- Written by: Eric S. Calderon; George Krstic; F.J. DeSanto
- Directed by: Kenji Nakamura
- Voices of: Jon Bailey; Jason Marnocha; Frank Todaro; Lana McKissack; Ben Pronsky; Abby Trott
- Composer: Jingle Punks Music
- Countries of origin: United States; Japan
- Original language: English
- No. of seasons: 1
- No. of episodes: 8

Production
- Executive producers: Chad Gutstein; Eric Calderon; F.J. DeSanto; George Krstic; Jamie Iracleanos
- Producers: Yuzo Kuwahara; Toshiyuki Watanabe; Hiroshi Kumada; Micah Brooks
- Running time: 6–7 minutes
- Production companies: Hasbro Studios; Machinima, Inc.; Tatsunoko Production

Original release
- Network: go90
- Release: August 2 – September 20, 2016

Related
- Transformers: Titans Return; Transformers: Prime Wars Trilogy

Transformers: Combiner Wars is an animated web series developed by Eric S. Calderon, George Krstic, and F.J. DeSanto. Part of the Transformers franchise, it is the first installment of the Transformers: Prime Wars Trilogy, featuring elements taken from the Generation 1 continuity family and the comic books by IDW Publishing.

The series was co-produced by Machinima, Inc. and Hasbro's Allspark Animation for go90, and was animated by Tatsunoko Production. Prior to its launch, a set of four prelude videos was released that detailed some of the events which had transpired in this continuity prior to the start of the series.

== Premise ==
Four decades after the Great War between the Autobots and the Decepticons on Earth, the two factions have disbanded and a three-member ruling council rules in place of the absent leaders Optimus Prime and Megatron. An uneasy peace has been created on Cybertron, but the rise of the Combiners threatens to bring it to an end.

Prior to the events of the series, Optimus Prime and Megatron have engaged each other in a final duel, while the new combiner Victorion has been born from the Enigma of Combination. The new ruling council consists of Starscream, Rodimus Prime, the Mistress of Flame (a new female Transformer from the planet Caminus); Caminus has been devastated by the Combiner Wars, which has set the formidable Windblade on a quest for vengeance. Windblade, once an official "City Speaker" to the gigantic "Titans" is tired of the bureaucratic non-action of the council, who seem to sit idly while her people and her cities on Caminus perish. She decides that the only way to end the Combiner Wars is to take matters into her own vengeful hands.

== Cast and characters ==
Members of the cast were revealed at a panel at San Diego Comic Con 2016:

- Anna Akana as Victorion, a female Autobot Combiner who shares her name with a Brave Saga 2 robot.
- Jon Bailey as Optimus Prime, former leader of the disbanded Autobots.
- Michael Green as Metroplex, one of the legendary Titans for whom Windblade speaks.
- Charlie Guzman as Menasor, combined form of the Stunticons.
- Ricky Hayberg as Computron combined form of the Technobots.
- Amy Johnston as Maxima, a new character created for the series and ally of Windblade.
- Jason Marnocha as Megatron, former leader of the Decepticons.
- Lana McKissack as the Mistress of Flame, former ruler of the planet Caminus and current member of Cybertron's ruling council.
- Ben Pronsky as Rodimus Prime, Autobot member of Cybertron's ruling council.
- Patrick Seitz as Devastator, combined form of the Constructicons.
- Frank Todaro as Starscream, Megatron's former lieutenant and a member of the ruling council.
- Abby Trott as Windblade, vengeful female Transformer and former Cityspeaker.

== Episodes ==
The series consists of roughly five minute episodes.

| No. overall | No. in season | Title | Written by | Original release date | Prod. code | US viewers (millions) |
|---|---|---|---|---|---|---|
| 1 | 1 | "The Fall" | Eric S. Calderon, George Krstic, and F.J. DeSanto | August 2, 2016 | TBA | N/A |
Computron and Menasor emerge from a Space Bridge above the planet Caminus, locked in a grueling battle that ends in Computron's defeat and apparent demise. Menasor is then attacked by Windblade and Maxima, who succeed in defeating the Combiner; however, Maxima is killed. Before going offline, Menasor accuses Windblade of being a killer like him and informs her that the Council has the Enigma of Combination and plan to build an army of Combiners. Windblade then departs for Cybertron, leaving behind Computron's body with lights flickering.
| 2 | 2 | "The Council" | Eric S. Calderon, George Krstic, and F.J. DeSanto | August 9, 2016 | TBA | N/A |
The Council - Starscream, Rodimus Prime, and the Mistress of Flame - meet to discuss Menasor and Computron's recent clash and apparent demise, and Rodimus and the Mistress consider employing the Enigma of Combination to create their own Combiners in order to destroy the ones currently existing. Despite his own history, Starscream advocates against such action, reminding his colleagues that they lack a full understanding of the Enigma's workings. Unbeknownst to them, they are being observed by Windblade using Maxima's sniper rifle, and her attempt to destroy the Enigma is foiled by a most unexpected figure: Optimus Prime.
| 3 | 3 | "The Duel" | Eric S. Calderon, George Krstic, and F.J. DeSanto | August 16, 2016 | TBA | N/A |
Enraged by Prime's interference, Windblade attacks him, only to find herself unable to land a single blow on the veteran Autobot, who believes she was attempting to assassinate Starscream. After swiftly defeating her, Optimus advises Windblade to return to Caminus to help her people rebuild, until she informs him that the council has the Enigma of Combination, which she was attempting to destroy. Fearing that such a feat may be impossible, Optimus notes grimly that there may be only one being who can help them.
| 4 | 4 | "Unforgotten" | Eric S. Calderon, George Krstic, and F.J. DeSanto | August 23, 2016 | TBA | N/A |
Optimus Prime and Windblade find Megatron battling several of the Constructicons on an unknown planet, where he taunts the both of them and initially wants nothing to do with them. After learning that Starscream is in possession of the Enigma, however, he agrees to join their mission, and the three set off together. Unbeknownst to Windblade, however, the Constructicons have overheard their conversation.
| 5 | 5 | "Homecoming" | Eric S. Calderon, George Krstic, and F.J. DeSanto | August 30, 2016 | TBA | N/A |
As the council look upon the recovered bodies of Computron and Menasor, Optimus Prime's team make their way towards the Council chamber where the Enigma is being kept, with Megatron and Windblade expressing willingness to kill all the Council members while Optimus Prime condemns such a violent course. Learning of their approach, the Council members panic, with the Mistress of Flame suggesting that they threaten the intruders with the Enigma. The two groups confront each other, and after a heated exchange in which Megatron blasts Starscream, Optimus' team are forced to engage the Council's automated defenses; Devastator then breaches the Council chamber and grabs Rodimus, ripping off his arm and laughing maniacally.
| 6 | 6 | "A War of Giants" | Eric S. Calderon, George Krstic, and F.J. DeSanto | September 6, 2016 | TBA | N/A |
Optimus' team confronts Devastator, who is after the Enigma of Combination, and Megatron attempts to order his former minion to stand down; Devastator refuses, eager to claim the Enigma for himself. Victorion then arrives unannounced in search of the Enigma herself, and clashes with Devastator to prevent him from laying claim to it. The Council unlock the Enigma in desperation, and it falls to Starscream to activate it; unfortunately, this enables him to enact a scheme that he has had in the works all along. Fused with the Enigma's power, he takes control of the fallen Menasor and Computron and then enslaves Victorion and Devastator when they confront him, and uses the Enigma's power to merge all four with himself in order to form the Ultimate Combiner.
| 7 | 7 | "Darkest Hour" | Eric S. Calderon, George Krstic, and F.J. DeSanto | September 13, 2016 | TBA | N/A |
Starscream revels in the newfound power he has been granted by the Enigma of Combination, only to be overwhelmed by it, causing him to change form from a towering giant into a shapeless mass with the individual components of the Combiners he has enslaved floating in the midst of it. Driven mad, he begins unleashing attacks that level the Council's city, with the Mistress and Rodimus being blasted away while Megatron vainly tries to flee. In a desperate effort, Windblade attacks the maddened Decepticon only to be overwhelmed by his attack, leaving her unconscious at the feet of her allies as Starscream moves in for the kill.
| 8 | 8 | "Destruction's Dawn" | Eric S. Calderon, George Krstic, and F.J. DeSanto | September 20, 2016 | TBA | N/A |
Windblade finds herself in a white void speaking to Metroplex, who reminds her of her true role as City Speaker; linked with the ancient Titan, she calls upon him to grasp the monstrous form of Starscream in his massive arm, which emerges from beneath the Council City. With Starscream immobilized, Optimus and Megatron work together to finish him, with Megatron transforming into a giant cannon which Optimus then wields. Optimus is then stunned to find Windblade alive, and both of them are surprised when Megatron gives Windblade the recovered Enigma of Combination before departing, expressing only the desire that they not disturb him again. Windblade then presents the Enigma to Victorion, saying it belongs to the Combiners, and Victorion thanks her before departing with Devastator and the revived Menasor and Computron. The Mistress of Flame praises her actions, but Windblade then reveals that an even greater threat now looms with the end of the Combiner Wars: the return of the Titans.

== Sequel ==
On November 11, 2016, Machinima announced a sequel series titled Transformers: Titans Return. The series premiered in 2017.

The cast introduced Peter Cullen as Optimus Prime, Judd Nelson as Rodimus Prime, Michael Dorn as Fortress Maximus, Wil Wheaton as Perceptor, Nolan North as Metroplex, Jason David Frank as Emissary, MatPat as Computron and Kari Wahlgren as Victorion. Meanwhile, Abby Trott, Jason Marnocha, Frank Todaro, Lana McKissack, and Charlie Guzman reprised their previous roles as Windblade, Megatron, Starscream, the Mistress of Flame, and Menasor from Combiner Wars.
