= Abby Trott =

American voice actress

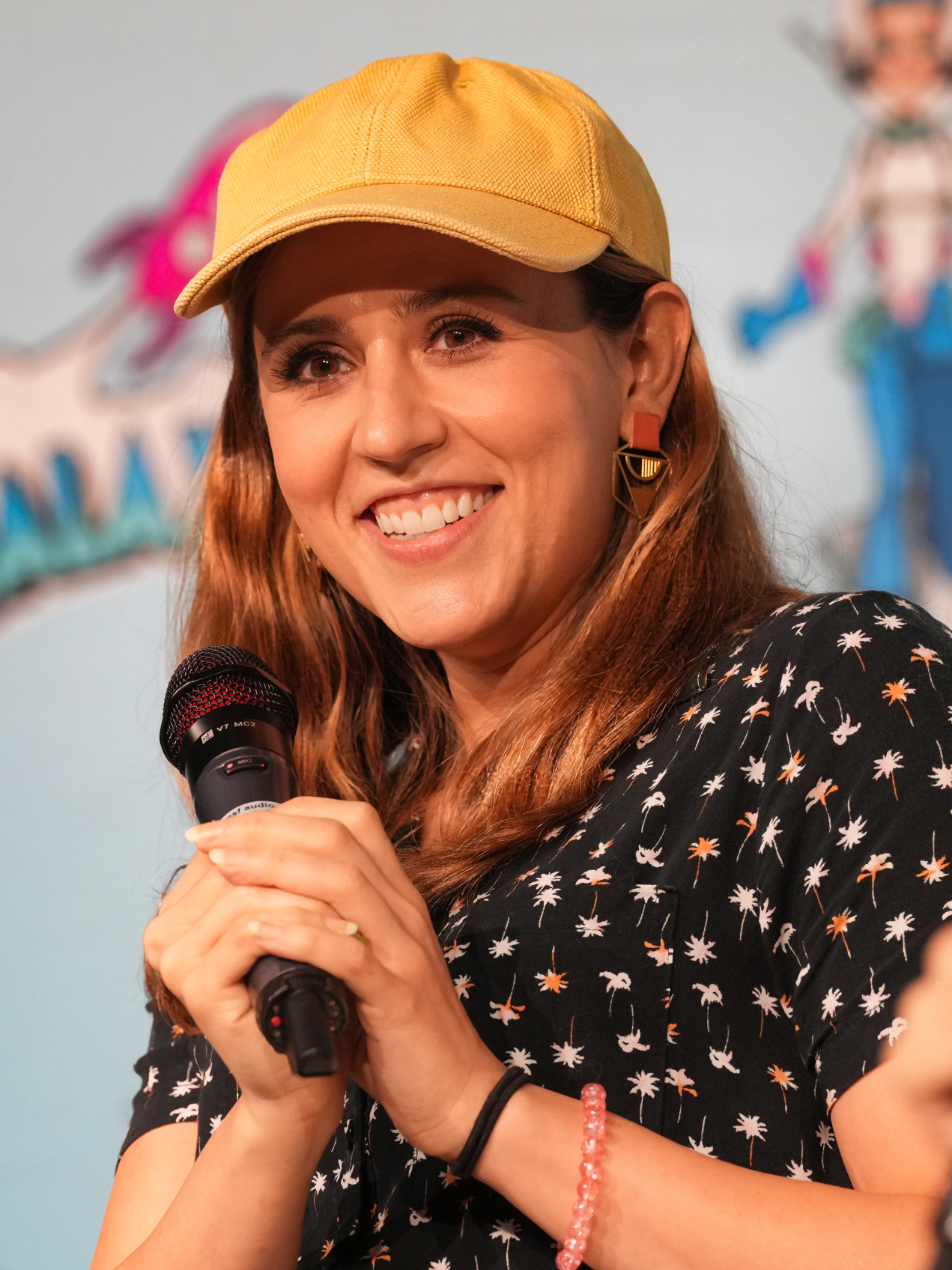
- Trott in 2024
- Born: Attleboro, Massachusetts, U.S.
- Occupation: Voice actress
- Years active: 2013–present
- Website: www.abbytrott.com

Abby Trott is an American voice actress. She started out by acting in puppet shows in Japan, before moving to the United States and joining Bang Zoom! Entertainment, where she has worked on numerous anime, animation, and video game series. Some of her major roles include Nezuko Kamado in Demon Slayer: Kimetsu no Yaiba, Momo Ayase in Dandadan, Shizuka Mikazuki in Zom 100: Bucket List of the Dead, Yoh Asakura in the Shaman King remake, Windblade in Transformers: Combiner Wars, and Maya Fey in Phoenix Wright: Ace Attorney – Spirit of Justice. She also performed the English version of the main theme music of Super Smash Bros. Ultimate.

== Biography ==
Abby Trott was born in Attleboro, Massachusetts. She graduated from Attleboro High School in 2004. Trott would later move to Tokyo, where she started professionally voice acting in puppet shows. In order to pursue a career in voice acting, she moved to New York City. In New York, she entered an online voice acting contest hosted by Bang Zoom! Entertainment, which she won. After winning, she moved to Los Angeles and began working as a voice actress.

In 2018, she performed the English version of "Lifelight", the song used as the main theme for the video game Super Smash Bros. Ultimate.

== Filmography ==
=== Anime ===
List of voice performances in anime
Year	Title	Role	Notes	Source
2015–21	The Seven Deadly Sins	Veronica Liones, Puora, Cath, Glariza		
2016–17	Hunter × Hunter	Machi	2011 series	
2016	Tales of Zestiria the X	Laphicet Crowe		
2016–19	Mob Psycho 100	Ichi Mezato		
2017	Anohana	Tetsudo "Poppo" Hisakawa (young)		
2017	Kabaneri of the Iron Fortress	Yukina		
2018–19	Bungo Stray Dogs	Kirako Haruno, Yamagiwa, Huckleberry Finn		
2018	Rokka: Braves of the Six Flowers	Nachetanya		
2019	Neon Genesis Evangelion	Hikari Horaki	Netflix dub	
2019–22	Rilakkuma and Kaoru	Kaoru, Ghost Girl		
2019	Cells at Work!	Lactic Acid Bacterium (Panda)		
2019–24	Demon Slayer: Kimetsu no Yaiba	Nezuko Kamado, Chuntaro, Hand Demon's Brother		
2019	Teasing Master Takagi-san	Hojo		
2019–20	Fate/Grand Order - Absolute Demonic Front: Babylonia	Fou		
2020	Sword Art Online	Lipia Zancale		
2020	Ghost in the Shell: SAC_2045	Nurse, Bank App Voice, Woman in Bar		
2020–21	Aggretsuko	Inui		
2020	Persona 5: The Animation	Tae Takemi		
2020–24	The Misfit of Demon King Academy	Eleonore Bianca		
2021	Kuroko's Basketball	Riko Aida		
2021	The Way of the Househusband	Ryota's Mother		
2021–22	Shaman King	Yoh Asakura	2021 series	
2021	Vinland Saga	Snorri	Netflix dub	
2021	Super Crooks	Kasey Ann		
2022	Engage Kiss	Linhua Hachisuka		
2022	Fate/Grand Carnival	Ibaraki-Douji, Operator		
2023–24	Nier: Automata Ver1.1a	Pod 153		
2023–24	Zom 100: Bucket List of the Dead	Shizuka Mikazuki		
2023	My Love Story with Yamada-kun at Lv999	Akane Kinoshita		
2024–25	Ishura	Kia		
2024–present	Mission: Yozakura Family	Mutsumi Yozakura		
2024	Uzumaki	Kirie Goshima		
2024–present	Dandadan	Momo Ayase		
2024–present	The Elusive Samurai	Hōjō Tokiyuki		
2025	Übel Blatt	Altea		
2025	Mono	Satsuki		
2025	Secrets of the Silent Witch	Rosalie		
2025	Sanda	Ichie Ono		
2025	The Summer Hikaru Died	Yoshiki Tsujinaka (Young), Ron		
2026	Akane-banashi	Akane Osaki		
2026	Steel Ball Run: JoJo's Bizarre Adventure	Marco		

=== Films ===
List of voice performances in films (including anime films)
Year	Title	Role	Notes	Source
2019	Evangelion Death (True)^{2}	Hikari Horaki	Netflix dub	
2019	Sherlock Holmes and the Great Escape	Little Rabbit	Shout Factory dub	
2019	Millennium Actress	Chiyoko Fujiwara (young)	Eleven Arts dub	
2020	NiNoKuni	Kotona Takashina, Astrid		
2021	Demon Slayer: Kimetsu no Yaiba – The Movie: Mugen Train	Nezuko Kamado		
2022	The Orbital Children	Nasa Houston		
2022	Drifting Home	Reina Hama		
2023	Suzume	Aya		
2025	Demon Slayer: Kimetsu no Yaiba – The Movie: Infinity Castle	Nezuko Kamado		

=== Animation ===
List of voice performances in animation
Year	Title	Role	Notes	Source
2016	Bunnicula	Veronica Rabbit		
2016	Transformers: Combiner Wars	Windblade	Transformers: Prime Wars Trilogy	
2017	Transformers: Titans Return	Windblade	Transformers: Prime Wars Trilogy	
2018	Transformers: Power of the Primes	Windblade	Transformers: Prime Wars Trilogy	
2018	Treehouse Detectives	Millie, Bat, Beatrice Beaver, Baby Condor, Lizard		
2019-2021	Carmen Sandiego	Ivy, Train Voice, Model 3, Cashier		
2019-2022	The Casagrandes	Becky, Various	Recurring role	
2020	Animaniacs	Ellie Sattler		
2022	The Croods: Family Tree	Dawn Betterman		
2024	X-Men '97	Spiral		
2024-2025	Barbie Mysteries	Barbie "Malibu" Roberts		
2025	LEGO Disney Frozen: Operation Puffins	Anna		

=== Video games ===
List of voice performances in video games
Year	Title	Role	Notes	Source
2013	Killer Instinct	Kim Wu		
2015	Lego Dimensions	Clarke "Mouth" Devereaux		
2016	Phoenix Wright: Ace Attorney – Spirit of Justice	Maya Fey		
2017	Tales of Berseria	Laphicet Crowe		
2017	Nier: Automata	Pod 153		
2018	Naruto to Boruto: Shinobi Striker	Avatar		
2018	Epic Seven	Clarissa, Mistychain, Merurin, Haste		
2019	Fire Emblem: Three Houses	Annette		
2019	Ace Combat 7: Skies Unknown	Avril Mead	English dub, Uncredited	
2019	Fortnite: Save the World	Swashbuckler Keelhaul		
2020	Bugsnax	Chippie, Eggler, Hunnabee, Ribblepede, Mt Sodie, Dr Sodie, La Sodieux, Sodie D, Sherbie		
2020	Persona 5 Royal	Tae Takemi	Replaces Kirsten Potter.	
2020	Fire Emblem Heroes	Annette	Post-launch role	
2020	Fortnite Battle Royale	Jules		
2021	League of Legends	Gwen		
2021	Nickelodeon All-Star Brawl	April O'Neil	Voiceover added in the June 2022 update	
2021	Demon Slayer: Kimetsu no Yaiba – The Hinokami Chronicles	Nezuko Kamado		
2022	My Little Pony: A Maretime Bay Adventure	Zipp Storm, Various		
2022	MultiVersus	Wonder Woman		
2022	Fire Emblem Warriors: Three Hopes	Annette		
2022	Disney Dreamlight Valley	Anna	while Kristen Bell was unavailable	
2022	Nickelodeon Kart Racers 3: Slime Speedway	April O'Neil		
2022	Tactics Ogre: Reborn	Sherri Phoraena		
2023	The Legend of Heroes: Trails into Reverie	Noel Seeker		
2023	Nickelodeon All-Star Brawl 2	April O'Neil, Computer Voice		
2023	Granblue Fantasy Versus: Rising	Karyl		
2024	Infinity Nikki	Nikki		
2024	Marvel Rivals	Magik, Lady Loki		
2024	Stranger Things VR	Nancy Wheeler		
2024	Teenage Mutant Ninja Turtles: Mutants Unleashed	Leatherhead		
2025	Date Everything!	Shelley		
2025	Double Dragon Revive	Marian Kelly		
2026	Castlevania: Belmont's Curse	Rose Belmont		
2027	Persona 4 Revival	Rise Kujikawa		

== Awards and nominations ==
Year	Award	Category	Work/Recipient	Result	Ref.
2024	8th Crunchyroll Anime Awards	Best Voice Artist Performance (English)	Nezuko Kamado (Demon Slayer: Kimetsu no Yaiba Swordsmith Village Arc)	Nominated	
