= Transformers Go! =

Japanese anime series and toy line

- Genre: Adventure, mecha
- Created by: Takara Tomy
- Original video animation
- Directed by: Toshifumi Kawase
- Written by: Toshifumi Kawase
- Studio: Tatsunoko Production
- Released: July 1, 2013 – April 1, 2014
- Runtime: 13 minutes
- Episodes: 10

Transformers Go! (参乗合体 トランスフォーマーGo!, Sanjou gattai Transformer Go!) is a Transformers anime series and toyline exclusive to Japan. It features several Autobots teaming up to battle the evil Predacons seeking to conquer Earth. It is the only animated series in the franchise to be produced in Japan since Transformers: Cybertron in 2005.

== Summary ==
The series is set within the same continuity as Transformers: Prime, and takes place in Japan. The main antagonists, the Predacons, aim to collect several energy sources called Legend Disks in order to resurrect their leader, Dragotron (the Japanese name for Predaking). Groups of Predacons attack locations in Japan where the Legend Disks are located. During these attacks, two cousins, Isami Tatewaki and Tobio Fuma, revive the Samurai and Shinobi Autobot teams, respectively. They are then tasked by Optimus Prime to retrieve the Legend Disks before the Predacons do, however, complications arise when it is discovered that the Disks are in fact scattered throughout different time periods. The rest of the series follows an episodic format, with either the Samurai or Shinobi teams and their respective child sidekicks traveling to different time periods, trying (and usually failing) to retrieve the disks.

== Characters ==
=== Autobots ===
- Optimus Prime - the superheroic leader of the Autobots. He appears later in the series as Optimus ExPrime, a triple changer consisting of a bullet train and dragon alt mode who can combine with other Autobots.
- Samurai Swordbot Team - a trio of Samurai Autobots with the ability to merge, with their form being dubbed "Go" in addition to whichever of them is in charge of the combination, i.e. "GoKenzan."
  - Kenzan - Transforms into a Police car. While there is no clear chain of command among the Samurai Autobots, Kenzan seems to take a leadership role.
  - Jinbu - Transforms into a Fighter Jet. Specialises in scouting and aerial combat.
  - Ganoh - Transforms into a Fire engine. Functions as the team's 'muscle'.
- Shinobi Swordbot Team - a trio of Ninja Autobots who can combine into various forms.
  - Gekisomaru - Transforms into a Lion. While there is no clear chain of command among the Shinobi Autobots, Gekisoumaru seems to take a leadership role.
  - Hishoumaru - Transforms into an Eagle. Like Jinbu, he is the team's air support.
  - Sensuimaru - Transforms into a Shark. Specialises in underwater combat. Oddly, he has been seen submerged 'underwater' while on dry land.

=== Predacons ===
- Dragotron - the evil leader of the Predacons who has been imprisoned on Earth for centuries.
- Oni-a group of four elite generals subservient to Dragotron:
  - Budora - Second in command of the Predacons. While not openly traitorous, he has stated that he would prefer it that Dragotron never wake up and he remain leader of the Predacons. He is a repaint of the toy exclusive Predacon, Grimwing
  - Gaidora - A hulking, brutish Predacon who functions as the team's muscle. He is a repaint of the toy exclusive Lazerback
  - Bakudora - A swift and loyal Predacon who functions as the team's air support. He is a repaint of the toy exclusive Ripclaw
  - Judora - Another flying Predacon, who acts as second to Budora. He is a repaint of the toy exclusive Skystalker
- Jaki - a quintet of lesser Predacons who can combine into the gestalt Goradora: They are all based on the Transformers Prime Abominous set
  - Dorara
  - Barara
  - Burara
  - Garara
  - Jurara

== Toyline ==
The Go! toyline consists of several new Autobot figures, while the Predacons and other figures are repaints or Japanese introductions of toys from the Transformers: Prime toyline.

=== Autobots ===
- G11 Hunter Optimus Prime - a redeco of Beast Hunters Optimus Prime
- G26 Optimus Prime EX - a new figure with dragon and bullet train alternate modes, capable of combining with other Autobot figures
- Samurai Autobots
  - G01 Kenzan - transforms into a police car
  - G02 Jinbu - transforms into a jet fighter
  - G03 Ganoh - transforms into a fire truck
- Shinobi Autobots
  - G05 Gekisomaru - transforms into a lion
  - G10 Hishomaru - transforms into an eagle
  - G20 Sensuimaru - transforms into a shark
- G06 Hunter Smokescreen - redeco of Beast Hunters Smokescreen
- G14 Hunter Bumblebee - redeco of Beast Hunters Bumblebee
- G15 Hunter Bulkhead - redeco of Beast Hunters Bulkhead
- G15 Hunter Wheeljack - redeco of Beast Hunters Wheeljack
- G19 Hunter Ratchet - redeco of Beast Hunters Ratchet
- G25 Go Prime - a redeco of Prime Thundertron and Leo Prime

=== Predacons ===
- G12 Dragotron (ドラゴトロン) - redeco of Prime Predaking
- G23 Gurren Dragotron (グレンドラゴトロン) - Dragotron's New form, redeco of Beast Fire Predaking
- Oni Predacons(プレダコン四鬼衆)
  - G04 Gaidora (ガイドーラ) - redeco/retool of Prime Lazerback/Vertebreak
  - G07 Bakudora (バクドーラ) - redeco/retool of Prime Ripclaw/Ser-Ket
  - G08 Budora (ブドーラ) - redeco/retool of Prime Grimwing/Darksteel
  - G21 Judora (ジュドーラ) - redeco/retool of Prime Skystalker/Sky Lynx/Backbite
- Jaki Predacons(プレダコン邪鬼軍団) / G09 Gorādora(ゴラードラ)
  - Dorara (ドララ) - redeco of Prime Hun-Gurrr
  - Barara (バララ) - redeco of Prime Windrazor
  - Burara (ブララ) - redeco of Prime Blight
  - Garara (ガララ) - redeco of Prime Twinstrike
  - Jurara (ジュララ) - redeco of Prime Rippersnapper

=== Decepticons ===
- Hunter Nemesis Prime - a black redeco of Beast Hunters Optimus Prime.
- G13 Hunter Shockwave - redeco of Beast Hunters Shockwave
- G17 Hunter Starscream - redeco of Beast Hunters Starscream
- G18 Hunter Soundwave - redeco of Beast Hunters Soundwave

== Other merchandise ==
In 2014, special edition Transformers Go! toys were distributed with chewing gum by Kabaya Foods, to mark the 30th anniversary of the Tranformers franchise.
