= Allspark =

American production and distribution company

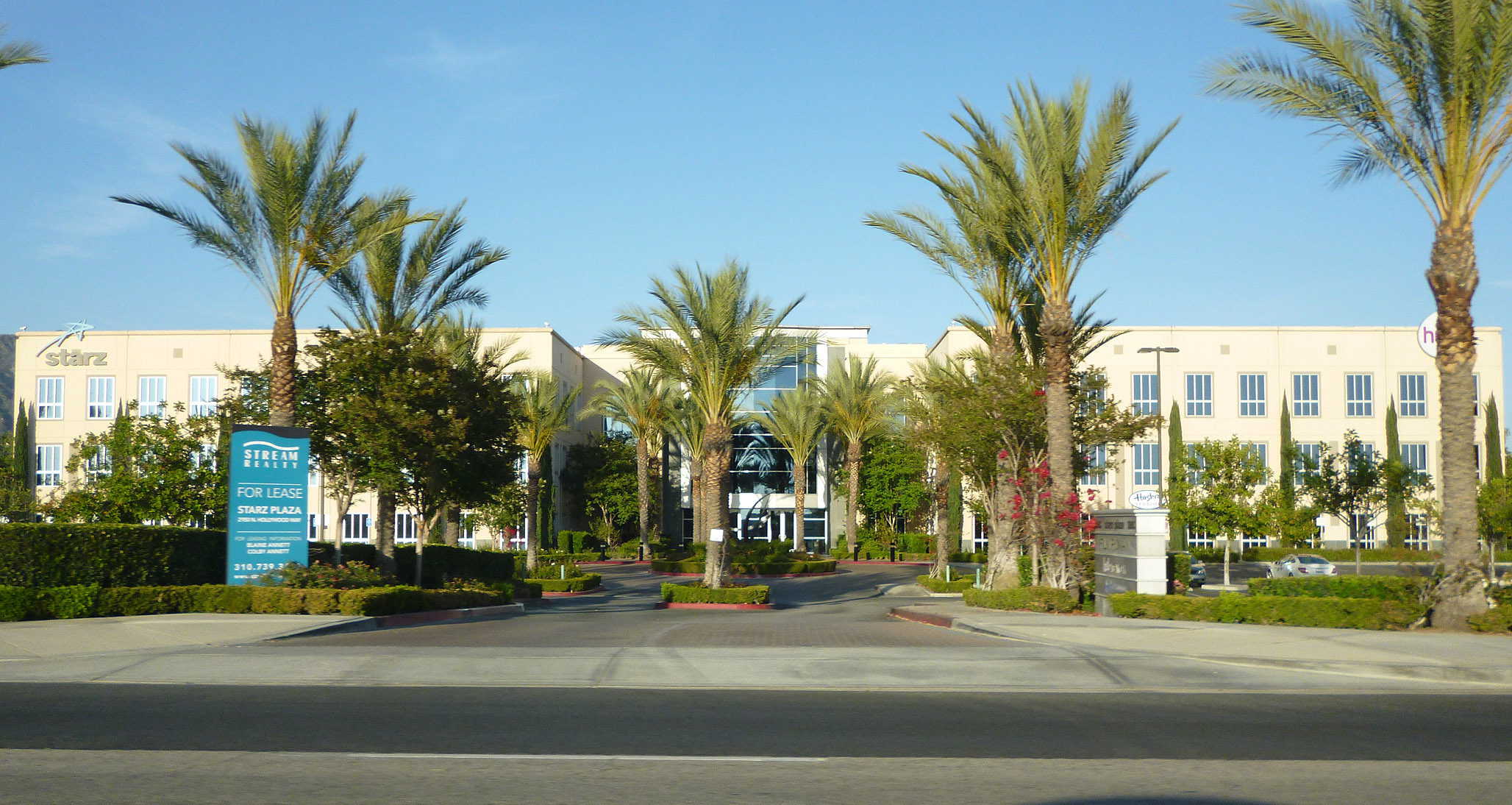
- Hasbro Studios (Burbank headquarters at Starz Plaza pictured)
- Formerly: Hasbro Studios, LLC (2009–2019)
- Type: In-name-only unit of Hasbro Entertainment
- Industry: Entertainment
- Predecessors: Claster Television; Hasbro Entertainment (first incarnation)
- Founded: March 6, 2009; 17 years ago in Los Angeles, California, United States
- Defunct: October 9, 2020; 6 years ago
- Fate: Absorbed into eOne (now Lionsgate Canada) with its library integrated into Hasbro Entertainment
- Successor: Lionsgate Canada (2020–2023); Hasbro Entertainment (second incarnation) (2023–present)
- Headquarters: Burbank, California, United States
- Number of locations: 3
- Production output: Animation; Game shows; Television shows; Films
- Services: Licensing
- Parent: Hasbro
- Divisions: Allspark Animation; Allspark Pictures; Cake Mix Studios
- Website: Official website (now redirected to Lionsgate website)

Allspark, formerly known as Hasbro Studios, LLC, was an American production and distribution company owned by toy and multimedia company Hasbro and based in Burbank, California that was in operation from 2009 to 2019. Originally just a television division, many of its shows were based on Hasbro properties and were broadcast on multiple media platforms, including Hasbro's joint venture Discovery Family.

Allspark Pictures was Allspark's live-action production label, while Allspark Animation was its animation production label. Cake Mix Studio was the company's Rhode Island–based producer of commercials and short form content.

Production and distribution of film and television content based on Hasbro properties shifted to Entertainment One (or eOne for short) following its acquisition by Hasbro on December 30, 2019 and under the leadership of Entertainment One president Darren Throop, president of family brands Olivier Dumont and former HBO head of programming Michael Lombardo. As a result, Allspark was absorbed into Entertainment One. However, in late-2022, Hasbro announced their intent to sell eOne with companies such as Fremantle (who dropped out of the bid), Lionsgate, Legendary, CVC Capital Partners and GoDigital Media Group bidding for the acquisition, a transaction that would place the distribution rights to the Allspark library and newer content back to Hasbro. It was ultimately decided that on August 3, 2023, Lionsgate announced that it would acquire Entertainment One for $500 million. The deal closed on December 27, 2023 and Entertainment One got renamed to Lionsgate Canada on June 7, 2024.

In August 2023, Hasbro announced a new banner titled Hasbro Entertainment.

== Background ==
In the early 1980s, when Hasbro began creating animated series based on their properties, they hired Sunbow Productions, who was already producing commercials for them, to create such series as G.I. Joe and The Transformers which would be syndicated by Hasbro's Claster Television subsidiary. In May 2008, Hasbro reacquired the Sunbow-produced animated series based on their properties from TV-Loonland AG for $7 million. The funds would help TV-Loonland AG (the owner of the Sunbow catalogue) to pay off its debts, and for Hasbro to create programs in-house.

== History ==
=== Hasbro Studios (2009–2019) ===
Hasbro Studios' logo.

Hasbro Studios was founded in 2009 for TV development, production and distribution, with Stephen J. Davis as president. On October 10, 2010, Hasbro Studios and Discovery Communications relaunched the channel formerly known as Discovery Kids as The Hub (Now known as Discovery Family). On November 9, 2010, Hasbro Studios signed an agreement with Canadian media company Corus Entertainment to broadcast their productions on YTV and Teletoon. On October 6, 2011, Hasbro Studios signed an agreement with seven US and international airlines, such as Continental Airlines and Qantas, to broadcast shows on their planes. In March 2012, the studio started venturing into foreign co-productions starting with Play-Doh (DoPei Le Doh), mixed animation and live action series with Toonmax, part of the Shanghai Media Group.

In December 2012, Hasbro transferred all entertainment divisions to Hasbro Studios, including their Los Angeles–based film group, and Cake Mix Studio, the company's Rhode Island–based producer of commercials and short form content. On February 28, 2013, the studio laid off three staffers in its Game & Reality Show Production & Development department, which was moved under vice president Kevin Belinkoff along with the animation department's management and outside creative consultants.

In August 2014, Josh Feldman was appointed as head of development for Hasbro Studios, as he will oversee live-action and TV series. On October 20, the studio announced the new film finance production label Allspark Pictures.

Hasbro Studios released its first non-soundtrack album, Truly Outrageous: A Tribute to Starlight Records, with Legacy Recordings on August 7, 2015. This promotion album for Jem film consisted of remakes of classic Jem TV series songs.

On December 15, 2015, Hasbro Studios and Paramount Pictures have signed a deal to create a five-property movie universe produced by Hasbro's Allspark Pictures and distributed by Paramount Pictures. The properties in this movie-verse are G.I. Joe, Micronauts, Visionairies, M.A.S.K. and Rom.

After two attempted films for Stretch Armstrong, the property was picked up by Netflix in January 2016 for a full order as a 26-episode animated series, making it the first deal between the company and the streaming service. By March 2017, Hasbro Studios' executive staff and its animation and toy prototyping teams moved to the Burbank office building. In 2017, Hasbro Studios launched its first franchise through YouTube called Hanazuki: Full of Treasures.

On November 3, 2017, Hasbro Studios and Paramount extended their relationship, with an exclusive five year production deal for Allspark Pictures and Allspark Animation to create original and franchise-based films. Both Allspark units were newly formed (Allspark Pictures was formerly a film finance label), with the film unit led by Greg Mooradian and the animation unit led by Meghan McCarthy. Paramount and Hasbro would also work together on TV series.

With the loss of the Jurassic Park license in 2016, Hasbro launched a new dinosaurs based franchise, its second new studio property, with its Chomp Squad animated series on January 6, 2018. On May 1, 2018, Hasbro announced that they were acquiring Power Rangers and other entertainment assets from Saban Capital Group, which was completed on June 12, 2018. At the time, Power Rangers was renewed for three more seasons until 2021, and the animated series Treehouse Detectives had nearly two seasons produced.

=== Allspark (2019–2020) ===
On March 26, 2019, Stephen Davis announced that Hasbro Studios would be rebranded as "Allspark", named after the fictional artifact featured in the Transformers franchise.

On May 7, 2019, Allspark and Boulder Media announced a new feature animation studio. The companies had bid on an old ferry terminal for the studio, but were turned down by the Dún Laoghaire-Rathdown County Council in previous attempts.

On December 30, 2019, Hasbro completed the acquisition of the Canadian entertainment company Entertainment One.

=== Entertainment One era (2020–2023) ===
On October 9, 2020, eOne took over as Hasbro's new production arm and began development and distribution of content based on Hasbro properties from the toy company, resulting in Allspark being absorbed into the acquired company.

On August 22, 2022, Bloomberg reported that Hasbro was seeking to sell or restructure its media assets, including eOne, On the same day Darren Throop was announced to be stepping down as the company's CEO by the end of the year. On November 1, 2022, Hasbro sold Boulder Media to Australian media company Princess Pictures.

On November 17, 2022, Hasbro announced they were putting the entirety of Entertainment One up for sale, including all of their non-Hasbro assets ranging from scripted and unscripted television and films, but would exclude the company's ex-children's properties, which were already consolidated under Hasbro. Four months later, it was reported that Fremantle, Lionsgate and Legendary Entertainment are interested in the buyout.

The following month, it was reported Lionsgate and Legendary remained among the four potential buyers, the other two being CVC Capital Partners and GoDigital Media Group. Fremantle however dropped out of contention following an increase in the selling price, which was beyond what the company was willing to pay for the assets.

However, on April 20, 2023, Hasbro entered talks to sell eOne back to its founder Darren Throop. On July 17, 2023, Deadline reported that Lionsgate was a frontrunner to acquire Entertainment One. On August 3, 2023, Lionsgate announced that it would acquire Entertainment One for $500 million. The deal closed on December 27, 2023.

== Allspark Pictures ==
Allspark Pictures
- Formerly: Hasbro Films; Hasbro Film Group
- Type: Division
- Industry: Film production
- Founded: May 2008; 18 years ago
- Defunct: 2020; 6 years ago
- Fate: Merged with Entertainment One
- Headquarters: Burbank, California, United States
- Area served: Worldwide
- Key people: Greg Mooradian (president, Allspark Pictures)
- Production output: Film
- Services: Film development
- Parent: Entertainment One

Allspark Pictures, formerly Hasbro Films, or Hasbro Film Group, was a film production within Allspark, a subsidiary of Hasbro tasked with developing films for Hasbro properties.

In 1986, The Transformers: The Movie and My Little Pony: The Movie, animated theatrical films based on Hasbro properties, were released. Waddingtons, later purchased by Hasbro in 1994, Clue's US licensee, licensed a Clue film, released in 1985. Hasbro had previously licensed Transformers to DreamWorks for a live action film released in 2007. The Transformers franchise continued solely with Paramount Pictures, the distribution of and acquirer of DreamWorks, with the addition of the G.I. Joe property.

Hasbro and Universal Pictures signed an agreement in February 2008 to derive and produce four films from seven Hasbro properties: Battleship, Candy Land, Clue, Magic: The Gathering, Monopoly, Ouija, and Stretch Armstrong. Hasbro was to pay for all development costs for the films and Universal was supposed to pay $5 million per property not made into films. In May, Bennett Schneir was hired to lead its film division while Hasbro also reacquired animated series based on their properties from Sunbow Productions.

By January 2012, all Hasbro properties at Universal — except for Battleship and Ouija — were halted in development. While Hasbro's film division continued to have an office on the Universal lot, Hasbro was able to take the Universal agreement properties to any studio. Universal paid a multimillion-dollar fee instead of the $5 million per property to depart from the agreement.

On 31 January 2012, it was announced that Columbia Pictures, Happy Madison, and Adam Sandler were in final negotiations to develop the Candy Land film. In February, Stretch Armstrong was set up with Relativity Media. In October, Hasbro signed a three picture co-production two-year deal which includes a first look provision with Emmett/Furla for Monopoly, Action Man, and Hungry Hungry Hippos, with Envision Entertainment's partners Stepan Martisoyan and Remington Chase as co-financiers. In December, Hasbro transferred the feature films division into Hasbro Studios along with its other short film division. By October 10, 2013, Relativity and Hasbro had removed the Stretch Armstrong movie from their schedules.

Hasbro filed suit against Sweetpea Entertainment and Warner Bros. on May 12, 2013, regarding the announced Dungeons & Dragons (D&D) movie based on Chainmail. Hasbro had asserted that rights had reverted to Hasbro, while Sweetpea felt they had the rights under a 1994 agreement with TSR. Hasbro had reportedly just agreed to license D&D movie rights to Universal. On August 3, 2015, Warner Bros. announced that they will be developing a Dungeons & Dragons movie as a resolution to the lawsuit. The film will be based on the Forgotten Realms campaign world with Courtney Solomon and Roy Lee producing, David Leslie Johnson writing the screenplay, and produced by Sweetpea Entertainment and Allspark Pictures.

In January 2014, Hasbro announced a franchise film deal with 20th Century Fox for Magic: The Gathering by its subsidiary Wizards of the Coast. In October 2014, the studio announced its film self-finance/co-finance label Allspark Pictures with its first existing project Jem and the Holograms, along with My Little Pony: The Movie.

Hasbro's first original film project, Hacker Camp, was assigned to writer Tripper Clancy in February 2015. By July 2015, the Monopoly satire film with Emmett/Furla was set aside with Hasbro announcing that Lionsgate will distribute a Monopoly film with Andrew Niccol writing the film as a family-friendly action adventure film co-financed and produced by Lionsgate and Hasbro's Allspark Pictures.

Films' parent unit, Hasbro Studios, on December 15, 2015, agreed with Paramount Pictures to a deal creating a five-property movie universe by financing unit Allspark Pictures and distributed by Paramount Pictures. The properties in this movie-verse are G.I. Joe, Micronauts, Visionaries, M.A.S.K. and Rom. A writers’ room was organized to develop a "creative roadmap". On April 21, 2016, The Hollywood Reporter has reported that Michael Chabon, Brian K. Vaughan, Nicole Perlman, Lindsey Beer, Cheo Coker, John Francis Daley & Jonathan Goldstein, Joe Robert Cole, Jeff Pinkner, Nicole Riegel and Geneva Robertson has joined the writers room.

On November 2, 2016, The Weinstein Company has announced that a Furby movie is in development as a live action/CG-animated movie produced under the TWC-Dimension label.

After two attempts to purchase or merge with a filmed entertainment company, DreamWorks Animation and Lionsgate, fell apart due to pricing differences, Hasbro Studios moved to create a full-fledged movie studio. Thus in October 2017, the company hired Greg Mooradian, currently working at Fox 2000, as president of Allspark Pictures starting January 2018. Variety's sources also indicated that the company was looking for financing for a while in the hundred million dollars range.

By November 2017, a five-year exclusive distribution and production pact was signed between Hasbro and Paramount Pictures for Allspark Pictures and Allspark Animation films. Plus Meghan McCarthy was promoted to head up for Allspark Animation.

== Filmography and discography ==
=== Television filmography ===
==== Animated television series (under Allspark Animation) ====
Title	Production partner	Premiere	Finale	Channel
Pound Puppies (2010)	Paul & Joe Productions (season 1); 9 Story Entertainment (episodes 1 to 7); DHX Media/Vancouver (episodes 8 to 65)	October 10, 2010	November 16, 2013	The Hub; Hub Network
My Little Pony: Friendship Is Magic	DHX Media/Vancouver	October 10, 2010	October 12, 2019	The Hub; Hub Network; Discovery Family
Bluey	HIT Entertainment	October 10, 2010	present	The Hub
G.I. Joe: Renegades	Darby Pop Productions	November 26, 2010	July 23, 2011	The Hub
Transformers: Prime	K/O Paper Products; Darby Pop Productions	November 29, 2010	July 26, 2013	The Hub; Hub Network
Transformers: Rescue Bots	Atomic Cartoons; Darby Pop Productions (season 1); Vision Animation; Moody Street Kids (season 2); DHX Media (seasons 3 to 4)	February 18, 2012	October 22, 2016	The Hub; Hub Network; Discovery Family
Kaijudo	Moi Animation	June 2, 2012	December 28, 2013	The Hub; Hub Network
Littlest Pet Shop (2012)	DHX Media/Vancouver	November 10, 2012	June 4, 2016	The Hub; Hub Network; Discovery Family
Transformers: Robots in Disguise (2015)	Darby Pop Productions (seasons 1 to 2)	March 14, 2015	November 11, 2017	Cartoon Network
Blazing Team: Masters of Yo Kwon Do	Alpha Animation	November 13, 2015	September 9, 2017	Discovery Family
Stretch Armstrong and the Flex Fighters	Digital eMation	November 17, 2017	September 7, 2018	Netflix
Littlest Pet Shop: A World of Our Own	Boulder Media Limited	April 14, 2018	January 26, 2019	Discovery Family
Transformers: Cyberverse	Boulder Media Limited	September 1, 2018	June 7, 2020	Cartoon Network
Hanazuki: Full of Treasures	Titmouse, Inc.	December 1, 2018	May 4, 2019	Discovery Family
Transformers: Rescue Bots Academy	Boulder Media Limited	January 5, 2019	June 5, 2021	Discovery Family
My Little Pony: Pony Life	Boulder Media Limited; Entertainment One	June 21, 2020	May 22, 2021	Discovery Family
Transformers: War for Cybertron Trilogy	Rooster Teeth Studios; Polygon Pictures	July 30, 2020	July 29, 2021	Netflix
Zoids Wild	OLM, Inc.; Takara Tomy	August 14, 2020	October 3, 2020	Netflix

==== Animated web series ====
Title	Production partner	Premiere	Finale	Platform
Transformers: Combiner Wars (Prime Wars Trilogy – season 1)	Machinima, Inc.	August 2, 2016	September 20, 2016	go90
Transformers: Titans Return (Prime Wars Trilogy – season 2)	Machinima, Inc.	November 14, 2017	January 9, 2018	go90
Transformers: Power of the Primes (Prime Wars Trilogy – season 3)	Machinima, Inc.	May 1, 2018	July 3, 2018	go90
Hanazuki: Full of Treasures	Titmouse, Inc.	January 12, 2017	July 14, 2017	YouTube
Littlest Pet Shop: A World of Our Own	Boulder Media Limited	October 4, 2017	April 24, 2018	YouTube
My Little Pony: Equestria Girls	DHX Media/Vancouver	November 17, 2017	June 23, 2020	YouTube
Chomp Squad	Flying Bark Productions, Huminah Huminah Animation	January 5, 2018	June 2, 2018	YouTube

==== Live-action television series ====
Title	Production partner	Premiere	Finale	Channel
Taylor Swift: Journey to Fearless	Big Machine; Shout! Factory	October 22, 2010	October 24, 2010	The Hub
Hubworld	Natural 9 Entertainment	November 5, 2010	October 29, 2011	The Hub
Clue	Metzner Films; Slow Genius	November 14, 2011	January 1, 2012	The Hub
Power Rangers Beast Morphers	Power Rangers Productions, Ltd.; Toei Company, Ltd.	March 2, 2019	December 12, 2020	Nickelodeon
Power Rangers Dino Fury	Power Rangers Productions, Ltd.; Toei Company, Ltd.	February 20, 2021	September 29, 2022	Nickelodeon
Power Rangers Cosmic Fury	Power Rangers Productions, Ltd.; Toei Company, Ltd.	September 29, 2023	September 29, 2023	Netflix

==== Live-action game shows ====
Title	Production partner	Premiere	Finale	Channel
Trivial Pursuit: America Plays	Wheeler/Sussman Productions; Debmar-Mercury	September 22, 2008	May 22, 2009	CBS (Syndicated)
Family Game Night	ZOO Productions	October 10, 2010	November 9, 2014	The Hub; Discovery Family
Pictureka!	Linda Ellman Productions	October 11, 2010	January 3, 2011	The Hub
The Game of Life	Andrew Golder Productions; 1/17 Productions	September 3, 2011	April 15, 2012	The Hub
Scrabble Showdown	Rubicon Entertainment	September 3, 2011	April 15, 2012	The Hub
Monopoly Millionaires' Club	Entertain The Brutes; Scientific Games	February 7, 2015	April 30, 2016	Syndication

=== Cinematic filmography ===
==== Feature-length films ====
Title	Production by	Year	Budget	Box office	Note
Transformers	DreamWorks Pictures; Paramount Pictures; di Bonaventura Pictures	July 3, 2007	$150 million	$709.7 million	—N/a
Transformers: Revenge of the Fallen	DreamWorks Pictures; Paramount Pictures; di Bonaventura Pictures	June 24, 2009	$200 million	$836.3 million	—N/a
G.I. Joe: The Rise of Cobra	Paramount Pictures; Spyglass Entertainment; di Bonaventura Pictures	August 7, 2009	$175 million	$302.5 million	—N/a
Transformers: Dark of the Moon	Paramount Pictures; di Bonaventura Pictures	June 29, 2011	$195 million	$1.12 billion	—N/a
Battleship	Universal Pictures; Bluegrass Films; Film 44	May 18, 2012	$209–220 million	$303 million	—N/a
G.I. Joe: Retaliation	Paramount Pictures; Metro-Goldwyn-Mayer Pictures; Skydance Productions; di Bonaventura Pictures	March 28, 2013	$155 million	$375.7 million	—N/a
Transformers: Age of Extinction	Paramount Pictures; di Bonaventura Pictures; China Movie Channel; Jiaflix Enterprises	June 27, 2014	$210 million	$1.104 billion	—N/a
Ouija	Universal Pictures; Blumhouse Productions; Platinum Dunes	October 24, 2014	$5 million	$103.6 million	—N/a
Jem and the Holograms	Universal Pictures; Blumhouse Productions; SB Projects; Allspark Pictures	October 23, 2015	$5 million	$2.3 million	
Ouija: Origin of Evil	Universal Pictures; Blumhouse Productions; Platinum Dunes; Allspark Pictures	October 21, 2016	$9–12 million	$81.7 million	
Transformers: The Last Knight	Paramount Pictures; di Bonaventura Pictures	June 21, 2017	$217 million	$605.4 million	
My Little Pony: The Movie	Allspark Pictures; DHX Media; Lionsgate	October 6, 2017	$6.5 million	$61.3 million	Animated
Bumblebee	Paramount Pictures; di Bonaventura Pictures; Allspark Pictures; Tencent Pictures	December 21, 2018	$100–137 million	$468 million	

==== Television films and specials ====
Title	Production partner	Premiere	Released	Notes
My Little Pony: Equestria Girls	DHX Media/Vancouver	June 16, 2013	Theaters; Hub Network	—N/a
Transformers Prime Beast Hunters: Predacons Rising	K/O Paper Products; Darby Pop Productions	October 4, 2013	Hub Network	Series finale of Transformers: Prime.
My Little Pony: Equestria Girls – Rainbow Rocks	DHX Media/Vancouver	September 27, 2014	Theaters; Discovery Family	Originally planned to be broadcast on Hub Network.
My Little Pony: Equestria Girls – Friendship Games	DHX Media/Vancouver	September 26, 2015	Discovery Family	—N/a
My Little Pony: Equestria Girls – Legend of Everfree	DHX Media/Vancouver	October 1, 2016	Netflix; Discovery Family	First premiered on Netflix, launched on Blu-ray and DVD on November 1, 2016, and premiered on Discovery Family following Netflix's premiere.
My Little Pony: Equestria Girls – Magical Movie Night	DHX Media/Vancouver	June 24 – July 8, 2017	Netflix; Discovery Family	Three 22-minute TV specials: "Dance Magic", "Movie Magic" and "Mirror Magic".
My Little Pony: Equestria Girls – Forgotten Friendship	DHX Media/Vancouver	February 17, 2018	Discovery Family	44-minute special episode.
Stretch Armstrong and the Flex Fighters: The Breakout	Digital eMation	March 13, 2018	Netflix	Interactive special episode.
My Little Pony: Equestria Girls – Rollercoaster of Friendship	DHX Media/Vancouver	July 6, 2018	Discovery Family	44-minute special episode.
Power Rangers Legacy Wars: Street Fighter Showdown	Lionsgate Games; Bat In The Sun; nWay Games	October 8, 2018	YouTube	Live-action crossover short film between Power Rangers and Capcom's Street Fighter, based on the video game Power Rangers: Legacy Wars.
My Little Pony: Best Gift Ever	DHX Media/Vancouver	October 27, 2018	Discovery Family	44-minute Christmas-themed special episode.
My Little Pony: Equestria Girls – Spring Breakdown	DHX Media/Vancouver	March 30, 2019	Discovery Family	44-minute special episode.
My Little Pony: Rainbow Roadtrip	Boulder Media Limited	June 29, 2019	Discovery Family	60-minute special episode.
My Little Pony: Equestria Girls – Sunset's Backstage Pass	DHX Media/Vancouver	July 27, 2019	Discovery Family	44-minute special episode.
My Little Pony: Equestria Girls – Holidays Unwrapped	DHX Media/Vancouver	November 2, 2019	Discovery Family	44-minute Christmas-themed special episode.

=== Discography ===
Title	U.S. release date	Length	Composer(s)	Label
Truly Outrageous: A Tribute to Starlight Records	August 7, 2015	—N/a	—N/a	Legacy Recordings
A Pony Kind of Christmas	November 6, 2015 (original); October 7, 2016 (expanded edition)	27:45 (original); 37:44 (expanded edition)	—N/a	Legacy Recordings
