= Transformers: Prime Wars Trilogy =

Multimedia toy storyline by Hasbro

- Original work: Transformers: Generation 1 by Hasbro and Takara
- Owner: Hasbro

Print publications
- Book: Titans Return - The Power of the Titan Masters
- Comics: Transformers: Windblade - Combiner Wars; Transformers: Combiner Hunters; Transformers: Titans Return

Games
- Video game(s): Transformers: Battle Tactics; Transformers: Devastation

Miscellaneous
- Toy: Transformers: Generations
- Web series: Transformers: Combiner Wars; Transformers: Titans Return; Transformers: Power of the Primes

Official website
- Hasbro official website

Transformers: Prime Wars Trilogy is a toyline and transmedia series that is part of the Transformers franchise by Hasbro.

== Premise ==
The main story line is set in an alternate Transformers: Generation 1 continuity.

=== Arc 1: "Combiner Wars" ===
Forty years after the Great War between the Autobots and the Decepticons on Earth, the two factions returned to Cybertron, where Optimus Prime defeated Megatron in a final duel, ending their war permanently. A Council of Worlds was forged, consisting of Rodimus Prime, Starscream and the Mistress of Flame, ruling Cybertron and Caminus in an uneasy peace. However, the rise of the Combiners caused destruction and death on Caminus, setting Windblade, the Cityspeaker of the Titans, on a quest for vengeance. Meanwhile, the Combiner Victorion is on her own mission to find the Enigma of Combination.

=== Arc 2: "Titans Return" ===
Following the end of the Combiner Wars, the Titans are awakened and Trypticon begins to wreak havoc on Cybertron. To combat Trypticon, Windblade gathers up a ragtag team of Transformers to resurrect an "ancient ally". And while some may be forever changed by the events, others may not emerge with their sparks intact.

=== Arc 3: "Power of the Primes" ===
Following the death of Optimus Prime, the rest of the Transformers must band together to survive before Megatronus / The Fallen can wipe out their species forever.

== Media ==
=== Video games ===
Title	Developer(s) / Publisher(s)	Platform(s)	Release date(s)
Transformers: Battle Tactics	DeNA	Android and iOS	January 30, 2015
Transformers: Devastation	PlatinumGames and Activision	Microsoft Windows, PlayStation 3, PlayStation 4, Xbox 360, and Xbox One	NA: October 6, 2015; EU: October 9, 2015
Transformers: Earth Wars	Backflip Studios	Android and iOS	June 2, 2016

=== Comics ===
Various comic book issues from The Transformers by IDW Publishing make reference to the Prime Wars Trilogy.

Title	Issue(s)	Writer(s)	Artist(s)	Premiere date	Finale date
"Combiner Wars"
The Transformers: Robots in Disguise	#39-42	John Barber	Livio Ramondelli	March 18, 2015	June 17, 2015
The Transformers: Windblade Vol. 2	#1-4	Mairghread Scott	Sarah Stone	March 25, 2015	June 24, 2015
Transformers: Combiner Hunters	One-shot	Mairghread Scott	Sara Pitre-Durocher	July 29, 2015	
"Titans Return"
Transformers: Titans Return	One-shot	Mairghread Scott; James Roberts; John Barber	Livio Ramondelli	July 27, 2016	
The Transformers: More than Meets the Eye	#56-57	James Roberts	Priscilla Tramontano	August 17, 2016	September 28, 2016
The Transformers: Robots in Disguise	#56-57	John Barber	Livio Ramondelli	August 31, 2016	September 28, 2016 (digital); October 5, 2016 (print)

=== Book ===
In July 2016, the Hasbro Pulse website published a book titled The Power of the Titan Masters to promote the Titans Return toyline.

=== Web series ===
On 2016, Machinima, Inc. and Hasbro Studios created an animated web series titled Transformers: Combiner Wars which started airing from August 2 to September 20 for Verizon's go90 streaming media format. Prior to the premiere on go90, a set of four prelude videos was released that detailed some of the events which had transpired in this continuity prior to the start of the series. The second season titled Transformers: Titans Return was released for November 2017. The third and final web season was titled Transformers: Power of the Primes and was announced for May 1, 2018. Rooster Teeth is no longer streaming the complete Prime Wars Trilogy on their website for audiences in the US & internationally.

== Future ==
Hasbro and Machinima announced a new trilogy of web series titled Transformers: War for Cybertron Trilogy, which is not related to the video game of the same name. The first installment is titled Transformers: Siege and was scheduled for 2019.

After Machinima closed down in February 2019, Hasbro Studios and Netflix closed a deal for War for Cybertron Trilogy animated series, produced by Allspark Animation, Rooster Teeth and Polygon Pictures for 2020. F. J. DeSanto returned as showrunner while George Krstic, Gavin Hignight, and Brandon M. Easton contributed as writers.

== Characters ==
This is a list of the characters from the Transformers: Prime Wars Trilogy.

=== Autobots ===
- Optimus Prime (voiced by Jon Bailey (Combiner Wars), Peter Cullen (Titans Return and Power of the Primes) - The leader of the Autobots. He is killed by Megatronus/The Fallen, until he was revived following Megatron's sacrifice.
- Rodimus Prime/Hot Rod/Rodimus Cron (voiced by Ben Pronsky (Combiner Wars), Judd Nelson (Titans Return, Power of the Primes) - A former member of the Council of Worlds. He turned back into Hot Rod after he failed at being a leader, saying that he didn't see the threat that Starscream planned. He is later corrupted by Overlord using the Matrix of Chaos, becoming Rodimus Cron. As Rodimus Cron, he can sense any presence of any Transformer, hidden or not. Eventually, the Matrix of Chaos gets removed from his chest, turning him back into Hot Rod, though physical and mental trauma remained after.
- Perceptor (voiced by Wil Wheaton) - An Autobot scientist Optimus suggested for a seat on the Council of Worlds.
- Combiners
  - Volcanicus (voiced by Gregg Berger) - Volcanicus is the combined robot form of the five Dinobots - Grimlock (also voiced by Gregg Berger), Snarl (voiced by Mikey Way), Sludge (voiced by Frank Todaro) He is sadly killed by Rodimus Cron, Slug (voiced by Jamie Iracleanos), and Swoop (voiced by Matthew Patrick).
  - Computron (voiced by Ricky Hayberg (Combiner Wars), Matthew Patrick (Titans Return)) - Computron is the combined robot form of the five Technobots - Scattershot, Strafe, Afterbreaker, Nosecone, and Lightsteed. He is killed by Rodimus Cron.
- Titans
  - Metroplex (voiced by Michael Green (Combiner Wars), Nolan North (Titans Return)) - Metroplex is a Titan stationed in Cybertron who is connected with Cityspeaker Windblade. He is killed by Trypticon.
  - Fortress Maximus (voiced by Michael Dorn, with grunts and screams by Nolan North) - Fortress Maximus was a decommissioned Titan, who was reawakened to fight Trypticon.
    - Emissary (voiced by Jason David Frank) - The Autobot Titan Master of Fortress Maximus, who grants additional powers to any linked Titan.
- Optimus Primal/Optimal Optimus (voiced by Ron Perlman) - Protector of the Requiem Blaster, and an agent to the gods. He eventually gains the Matrix of Leadership, becoming Optimal Optimus.

=== Decepticons ===
- Megatron (voiced by Jason Marnocha) - The leader of the Decepticons. Dies sacrificing himself to allow Optimal Optimus to use the Requiem Blaster to destroy the Matrix of Chaos.
- Starscream (voiced by Frank Todaro) - A Seeker who became a member of the Council of Worlds. After being killed by Metroplex, Starscream's spirit causes Trypticon to come back to life. Later, after Megatronus's death and Unicron's defeat, Starscream's spirit reappears behind Optimal Optimus and Optimus Prime, saying that he will be there as well for the new age of peace and prosperity of Cybertron.
- Elite Air Resistance Squadron - Seekers who are ordered to attack Trypticon, but are overwhelmed and killed.
  - Thundercracker
  - Skywarp
  - Sunstorm
  - Hotlink
- Overlord (voiced by Patrick Seitz) - A Decepticon whose robot form is the combined form of a tank and a jet. Defeated by Megatron in the past, Overlord sought revenge and pledged his loyalty to Megatronus. Using the Matrix of Chaos he uncovered from within the remains of Unicron, he corrupted Hot Rod into becoming Rodimus Cron. Killed by Megatron using the Requiem Blaster.
- Combiners
  - Devastator (voiced by Patrick Seitz (Combiner Wars), Rob Gavagan (Titans Return, Power of the Primes))- Devastator is the combined robot form of the six Constructicons - Scrapper, Long Haul (voiced by Frank Todaro), Scavenger, Mixmaster, Bonecrusher, and Hook. Killed by Rodimus Cron.
  - Menasor (voiced by Charlie Guzman) - Menasor is the combined robot form of the five Stunticons - Motormaster, Dead End, Breakdown, Drag Strip, and Brake-Neck. Killed by Overlord.
  - Predaking (voiced by Samoa Joe) - Predaking is the combined robot form of the five Predacons - Razorclaw, Rampage, Headstrong, Divebomb, and Tantrum. He is killed by Megatronus.
- Soundblaster
- Trypticon (voiced by Frank Todaro) - Decepticon Titan who is awakened by Starscream's ghost. Killed by the Power of the Matrix.

=== Camiens ===
- Mistress of Flame (voiced by Lana McKissack) - A Camien leader who served as a member of the Council of Worlds. She is killed by Overlord.
- Windblade (voiced by Abby Trott) - Cityspeaker from Caminus who became bloodthirsty after Caminus succumbed to the Combiner Wars.
- Maxima (voiced by Amy Johnston) - A comrade of Windblade. She is killed by Menasor.
- Victorion (voiced by Anna Akana (Combiner Wars), Kari Wahlgren (Titans Return, Power of the Primes)) - Victorion is the combined robot form of the six Torchbearers - Pyra Magna, Stormclash, Skyburst, Dust Up, Jumpstream, and Rust Dust. She is given the Enigma of Combination by Windblade, but is later killed by Rodimus Cron. Shares a name with a robot from Brave Saga 2.

=== Others ===
- Thirteen
  - Solus Prime (voiced by Jamie King) - A member of the Thirteen and the first female Transformer. She is accidentally killed by Megatronus. Appearing as a spirit, she sacrifices herself to kill Megatronus once and for all, as falling with him into the Well of Sparks.
  - Megatronus (voiced by Mark Hamill) - Also known as "The Fallen", Megatronus is a former member of the Thirteen and the First Decepticon. He searches for the Requiem Blaster with help from Overlord and Rodimus Cron. He plans to use the Enigma of Combination to merge the Matrix of Leadership and the Requiem Blaster into a doomsday device to kill every Transformer in the universe to try and revive Solus Prime. He is finally killed by Solus Prime, who appeared as a spirit, who falls with him into the Well of Sparks.
- Chorus of the Primes (voiced by Tay Zonday) - A council consisting of the deceased Primes who reside in the Primal Basilica. They help Rodimus Prime remove the Matrix of Leadership from him, turning him back into Hot Rod.
