= Adam Beechen =

American comic book writer

- Area: Writer
- Notable works: Hench, Robin, Countdown to Final Crisis

Adam Beechen is an American screen and comic book writer.

== Career ==
=== Animation ===
Beechen has written scripts for various cartoons, such as Teen Titans, The Wild Thornberrys, Rugrats, Pink Panther and Pals, Scooby-Doo! Mystery Incorporated, Transformers: Power of the Primes, The Batman, Edgar and Ellen, Littlest Pet Shop, Little Bill, The VeggieTales Show, Thomas & Friends: All Engines Go and the Ben 10 franchise. He was also the story editor on Hi Hi Puffy AmiYumi for Cartoon Network. He was an executive producer on The Adventures of Chuck and Friends. He was also the head writer for the Transformers: Robots in Disguise robot superhero TV series which ended in 2017.

Beechen has written for the Nickelodeon live-action series, Ned's Declassified School Survival Guide, and for the short-lived drama Savannah.

=== Comics ===
Beechen wrote several Rugrats, The Wild Thornberrys and Rocket Power comic strips for Nickelodeon Magazine.

Beechen's first credited published work was a graphic novel named Hench, with artist Manny Bello, was published by AiT/Planet Lar in 2004. He has also written scripts for Teen Titans Go! and Justice League Unlimited for DC Comics.

Currently, Beechen freelances for DC. He wrote issues of DC's weekly mini-series Countdown to Final Crisis and the mini-series Countdown to Adventure, featuring Animal Man, Starfire, and Adam Strange, for DC. He wrote a Batgirl mini-series that detailed why she acted out of character in previous appearances written by Beechen.

His follow-up original graphic novel with Bello, Dugout, was released by AiT/Planet Lar in 2008. At the New York Comic Con, Wildstorm announced he would be writing a new series, Killapalooza, with Trevor Hairsine on art duties. Also at Wildstorm he took over writing Wildcats during the World's End storyline.

== Bibliography ==
=== AiT/Planet Lar ===
- Hench (graphic novel) (with Manny Bello, tpb, 134 pages, June 2004, ISBN 1-47764-957-3)
- Dugout (graphic novel) (with Manny Bello, tpb, 88 pages, July 2008, ISBN 1-93205-154-6)

=== DC Comics ===
- Teen Titans Go! #8, "Naked City" (with Eric Vedder, June 2004) collected in Heroes on Patrol (tpb, 112 pages, 2004, ISBN 1-4012-0334-5)
- Justice League Unlimited (September 2004 – March 2007)
  - United They Stand (tpb, 104 pages, 2005, ISBN 1-4012-0512-7) collects:
    - "Divide & Conquer" (with Carlo Barberi, in #1, 2004)
    - "Pokerface" (with Ethen Beavers, in #2, 2004)
    - "Small Time" (with Carlo Barberi, in #3, 2004)
    - "Local Hero" (with Carlo Barberi, in #4, 2004)
    - "Monitor Duty" (with Carlo Barberi, in #5, 2005)
  - World's Greatest Heroes (tpb, 104 pages, 2006, ISBN 1-4012-1014-7) collects:
    - "In the Dimming Light" (with Carlo Barberi, in #6, 2005)
    - "Orphans" (with Ethen Beavers, in #7, 2005)
    - "The Island" (with Carlo Barberi, in #8, 2005)
    - "Castle Perilous" (with Carlo Barberi, in #9, 2005)
    - "Madness... Madness... They Call It Madness!" (with Carlo Barberi, in #10, 2005)
  - Champions of Justice (tpb, 104 pages, 2006, ISBN 1-4012-1015-5) collects:
    - "Postcard from the Edge" (with Carlo Barberi, in #11, 2005)
    - "Old School" (with Carlo Barberi, in #12, 2005)
    - "Nuts and Bolts" (with Carlo Barberi, in #13, 2005)
    - "Everybody Limbo!" (with Carlo Barberi, in #14, 2005)
    - "Urban Legend" (with Carlo Barberi, in #15, 2005)
  - The Ties That Bind (tpb, 144 pages, 2008, ISBN 1-4012-1691-9) collects:
    - "Smashing Through the Snow" (with Carlo Barberi, in #16, 2005)
    - "Let Freedom Ring" (with Carlo Barberi, in #17, 2006)
    - "Fare 48" (with Ethen Beavers, in #18, 2006)
    - "The Justice Rangers Ride Again!" (with Gordon Purcell, in #19, 2006)
    - "Just Us Girls" (written by Paul Storrie and drawn by Rick Burchett, in #20, 2006)
    - "Stormy Weather" (with Carlo Barberi, in #21, 2006)
    - "Outside Looking In" (with Rick Burchett, in #22, 2006)
  - Heroes (tpb, 144 pages, 2008, ISBN 1-4012-2202-1) collects:
    - "Heroes" (written by Mike McAvennie and drawn by Leigh Gallagher, in #23, 2006)
    - "Alone Among The Stars" (with Carlo Barberi, in #24, 2006)
    - "Devil May Care" (with Rick Burchett, in #25, 2006)
    - "The Ghosts of Atlantis" (written by Bill Williams and drawn by Carlo Barberi, in #26, 2006)
    - "Climb the Mountain" (with Carlo Barberi, in #27, 2006)
    - "Season's Greetings, Justice League" (written by Mike McAvennie and drawn by Sanford Greene, in #28, 2006)
    - "Untamed" (with Carlo Barberi, in #29, 2007)
  - "One-Man Justice League" (with Dave Santana, in #31, 2007)
- Robin vol. 4 (March 2006 – September 2008)
  - Wanted (tpb, 144 pages, 2007, ISBN 1-4012-1225-5) collects:
    - "Robin: Boy Wanted, Part One: Out Go the Lights" (with Karl Kerschl, in #148, 2006)
    - "Robin: Boy Wanted, Part Two: Assault on Precinct Nine" (with Freddie E. Williams II, in #149, 2006)
    - "Hard Answers" (with Freddie E. Williams II, in #150, 2006)
    - "Harder Questions" (with Freddie E. Williams II, in #151, 2006)
    - "It All Comes Back Around" (with Freddie E. Williams II, in #152, 2006)
    - "Run Through the Jungle" (with Freddie E. Williams II, in #153, 2006)
  - Teenage Wasteland (tpb, 208 pages, 2007, ISBN 1-4012-1480-0) collects:
    - "Ransom Demands" (with Freddie E. Williams II, in #154, 2006)
    - "Teenage Wasteland" (with Freddie E. Williams II, in #155, 2006)
    - "The High Dive" (with Freddie E. Williams II, in #156, 2006)
    - "Things That Go Bump in the Night" (with Frazer Irving, in #157, 2006)
    - "Strange Brew" (with Frazer Irving, in #158, 2007)
    - "First Date" (with Freddie E. Williams II, in #159, 2007)
    - "Freedom of the Press" (with Freddie E. Williams II, in #160, 2007)
    - "Little White Lies" (with Freddie E. Williams II, in #161, 2007)
    - "Paid in Full" (with Freddie E. Williams II, in #162, 2007)
  - The Big Leagues (tpb, 128 pages, 2008, ISBN 1-4012-1673-0) collects:
    - "Twelve Very Angry Men" (with Freddie E. Williams II, in #163, 2007)
    - "Making The Band" (with Freddie E. Williams II, in #164, 2007)
    - "The Other Hand" (with Freddie E. Williams II, in #165, 2007)
    - "The Big Leagues" (with Freddie E. Williams II, in #166, 2007)
    - "The Promise" (written by Brandon Thormas and drawn by Freddie E. Williams II, in #167, 2007)
- Batman: Legends of the Dark Knight #212, "A Legend of the Dark Knight" (with Steve Scott, November 2006)
- Teen Titans vol. 3 (March 2007 – July 2007)
  - Volume 7: Titans East (tpb, 144 pages, 2007, ISBN 1-4012-1447-9) collectS:
    - "Devil May Care" (written by Geoff Johns and drawn by Peter Snejbjerg, in #42, 2006)
    - "Titans East" (with Geoff Jones, Tony S. Daniel and Al Barrionuevo, in #43–46, 2007)
    - "Of Clowns and Clones" (with Chis Batista, in #47, 2007)
  - "Flags of Our Mothers" (with Al Barrionuevo, in #48, 2007)
  - "Life During Wartime" (with Al Barrionuevo, in #49, 2007)
- Countdown (March 2007 – January 2008)
  - "Death from Above" (with Paul Dini and David López, in #48, 2007)
  - "Changes of Address" (with Paul Dini and Carlos Magno, in #44, 2007)
  - "Another Fine Mess" (with Paul Dini and Dennis Calero, in #41, 2007)
  - "Forbidden Fruit" (with Paul Dini, Keith Giffen, David López and Mike Norton, in #37, 2007)
  - "Let's Make a Deal" (with Paul Dini, Keith Giffen and Carlos Magno, in #33, 2007)
  - "Bedlam Below!" (with Paul Dini, Keith Giffen and Ron Lim, in #25, 2007)
  - "Loneliest Number" (with Paul Dini, Keith Giffen and Howard Porter, in #20, 2007)
  - "Gone Tomorrow" (with Paul Dini and Tom Derenick, in #7, 2008)
  - "Outbreak" (with Paul Dini and Mike Norton, in #6, 2008)
  - "End Times" (with Paul Dini and Jim Starlin, in #5, 2008)
- Countdown to Adventure (mini-series) (August 2007 – March 2008)
  - Countdown to Adventure (tpb, 192 pages, 2008, ISBN 1-4012-1823-7) collects:
    - "The Home Front: New Kids on the Block" (with Eddy Barrows, in #1, 2007)
    - "The Home Front: Working Man's Blues" (with Eddy Barrows, in #2, 2007)
    - "The Home Front: In the Time of the Plague" (with Eddy Barrows, in #3, 2007)
    - "The Home Front: First, Do No Harm" (with Allan Goldman, in #4, 2007)
    - "The Home Front: Patient Zero" (with Allan Goldman, in #5, 2007)
    - "The Home Front: Rescue Parties" (with Allan Goldman, in #6, 2008)
    - "The Home Front: To Serve Rann" (with Allan Goldman, in #7, 2008)
    - "The Home Front: Heroic Measures" (with Allan Goldman, in #8, 2008)
- Countdown to Mystery (March 2008 – April 2008)
  - "More Pain Comics, Part VII: Untethered" (with Steve Gerber and Justiniano, in #7, 2008)
  - "More Pain Comics, Part VIII: Small Magic" (with Stephen Jorge Segovia, in #8, 2008)
- Batgirl vol. 2 (July 2008 – December 2008)
  - Redemption (tpb, 144 pages, 2009, ISBN 1-4012-2275-7) collects:
    - "Redemption Road, Part I: Square One" (with Jim Calafiore, in #1, 2008)
    - "Redemption Road, Part II: Trust is a Ghost" (with Jim Calafiore, in #2, 2008)
    - "Redemption Road, Part III: Daughters" (with Jim Calafiore, in #3, 2008)
    - "Redemption Road, Part IV: Daddy Issues" (with Jim Calafiore, in #4, 2008)
    - "Redemption Road, Part V: My Father made me" (with Jim Calafiore, in #5, 2008)
    - "Redemption Road, Part VI: The Great Gray Dragon" (with Jim Calafiore, in #6, 2008)
- Brave and the Bold vol. 3 #25, "System Compatibility" (with Roger Robinson, July 2009) collected in Milestone (tpb, 160 pages, 2010, ISBN 1-4012-2654-X)
- Batman Beyond vol. 3 (mini-series) (June 2010 – November 2010)
  - Hush Beyond (tpb, 144 pages, 2011, ISBN 1-4012-2988-3) collects:
    - "Hush Beyond, Part I: History Repeats" (with Ryan Benjamin, in #1, 2010)
    - "Hush Beyond, Part II: Past Crimes" (with Ryan Benjamin, in #2, 2010)
    - "Hush Beyond, Part III: Close Encounters" (with Ryan Benjamin, in #3, 2010)
    - "Hush Beyond, Part IV: The Other Side of the Mirror" (with Ryan Benjamin, in #4, 2010)
    - "Hush Beyond, Part V: Blood in Black Alleys" (with Ryan Benjamin, in #5, 2010)
    - "Hush Beyond, Part VI: Deep Down" (with Ryan Benjamin, in #6, 2010)
- Bruce Wayne: The Road Home: Commissioner Gordon (one-shot), "Gotham's Finest" (with Szymon Kudranski, October 2010) collected in Batman: Bruce Wayne – The Road Home (hc, 200 pages, 2011, ISBN 1-4012-3081-4)
- Nightmaster: Monsters of Rock (one-shot) (with Kieron Dwyer, November 2010)
- Batman Beyond vol. 4 (January 2011 – August 2011)
  - Industrial Revolution (tpb, 176 pages, 2012, ISBN 1-4012-3374-0) collects:
    - "The Heart of the Matter, Part 1 of 3: Madness, Mayhem & Mentachem" (with Ryan Benjamin, in #1, 2011)
    - "The Heart of the Matter, Part 2 of 3: Rough Justice" (with Ryan Benjamin, in #2, 2011)
    - "The Heart of the Matter, Part 3 of 3: Collateral Damage" (with Ryan Benjamin, in #3, 2011)
    - "Legends Of The Dark Knight: Max" (with Eduardo Pansica, in #4, 2011)
    - "Industrial Revolution, Part One of Three: A Riot Going On" (with Ryan Benjamin, in #5, 2011)
    - "Industrial Revolution, Part Two of Three: Industrial Disease" (with Ryan Benjamin, in #6, 2011)
    - "Industrial Revolution, Part Three of Three: Bad for Business" (with Ryan Benjamin, in #7, 2011)
    - "Legends of the Dark Knight: Inque" (with Chris Batista, in #8, 2011)
- Zatanna vol. 3 (January 2011 – August 2011)
  - "Shades" (with Chad Hardin, in #7, 2011)
  - "Brace Yourself" (with Jamal Igle, in #9, 2011)
  - "Wingman" (with Jamal Igle and Travis Moore, in #14, 2011)
  - "The Sorceress' Apprentice" (with Victor Ibáñez, in #16, 2011)
- JSA 80-Page Giant 2011 (one-shot), "Duty, Honor, Country" (with Howard Chaykin, June 2011)
- Batman Beyond vol 5 (February 2012 – July 2013)
  - 10,000 Clowns (tpb, 200 pages, 2013, ISBN 1-4012-4034-8) collects:
    - "10,000 Clowns (Prelude)" (with Norm Breyfogle, in #1–2, 2012)
    - "The Trigger Man" (with Norm Breyfogle, in #3–6, 2012)
    - "Legends of the Dark Knight" (with Norm Breyfogle, in #7–8, 2012)
    - "10,000 Clowns" (with Norm Breyfogle, in #9–18, 2012–2013)
  - Batgirl Beyond (tpb, 168 pages, 2014, ISBN 1-4012-4753-9) collects:
    - "Legends of the Dark Knight: Dana" (with Peter Nguyen, in #19–20, 2013)
    - "Undercloud" (with Norm Breyfogle and Adam Archer, in #21–26, 2013)
    - "Batgirl Beyond" (with Annie Wu, in #27–29, 2013)

=== Komikwerks ===
- What I Did on My Hypergalactic Interstellar Summer Vacation (graphic novel) (with Dan Hipp, tpb, 129 pages, September 2006, ISBN 0-97428-036-4)

=== WildStorm Productions ===
- Killapalooza (mini-series) (May 2009 – October 2009)
  - Killapalooza (tpb, 144 pages, 2010, ISBN 1-4012-2758-9) collects:
    - "A-One-Two-Three-Four!" (with Trevor Hairsine, in #1, 2009)
    - "...And Party Every Day!" (with Trevor Hairsine, in #2, 2009)
    - "Everybody Wants You (Dead)" (with Trevor Hairsine, in #3, 2009)
    - "Untitled" (with Trevor Hairsine, in #4, 2009)
    - "The Show Must Go On" (with Trevor Hairsine, in #5, 2009)
    - "You've Been A Great Audience... Thank You. Good Night!" (with Trevor Hairsine, in #6, 2009)
- Gen 13 vol. 4, #33–34 (with Cruddie Torian, December 2009 – February 2010)
- WildCats: World's End (January 2010 – December 2010)
  - "Red Blade" (with Tim Seeley, in #19–21, 2010)
  - "Foundations" (with Tim Seeley, in #22, 2010)
  - "The Protectorate" (with Tim Seeley, in #23–25, 2010)
  - "Desert Storms" (with Tim Seeley, in #26, 2010)
  - "Bad Medicine" (with Tim Seeley and Mike S. Miller, in #27–30, 2010)

== Screenwriting ==
- series head writer denoted in bold

=== Television ===
- Savannah (1996)
- The Wild Thornberrys (1998–2000)
- Little Bill (1999–2004)
- The Famous Jett Jackson (1999)
- Rocket Power (1999–2000)
- Rugrats (1999–2000)
- X-Men: Evolution (2001–2002)
- ¡Mucha Lucha! (2002) Episode: "Not So Buena Girl"
- Totally Spies! (2002)
- Jackie Chan Adventures (2002–2005)
- Static Shock (2003)
- Teen Titans (2003–2004)
- The Batman (2004-05)
- Hi Hi Puffy AmiYumi (2005–2006)
- Ben 10 (2006)
- Teenage Mutant Ninja Turtles (2006)
- Johnny Test (2006–2007)
- **Edgar & Ellen** (2007–2008)
- The Secret Saturdays (2008–2010)
- Batman: The Brave and the Bold (2008–2010)
- Ben 10: Alien Force (2008–09)
- Gormiti (2010)
- Generator Rex (2010)
- **Pink Panther and Pals** (2010)
- The Adventures of Chuck and Friends (2010–2012)
- Scooby-Doo! Mystery Incorporated (2010–2012)
- Ben 10: Ultimate Alien (2011)
- Voltron Force (2011)
- Hero Factory (2012–2014)
- Teen Titans Go! (2013)
- Hulk and the Agents of S.M.A.S.H. (2013–2014)
- Littlest Pet Shop (2013–2016)
- Beware the Batman (2014)
- The Tom and Jerry Show (2014)
- Sonic Boom (2014)
- **Transformers: Robots in Disguise** (2015–2017)
- The Stinky & Dirty Show (2016–2019)
- Ninjago: Hands of Time (2017)
- Miles from Tomorrowland (2017)
- Transformers: Titans Return (2017–2018)
- MacGyver (2018)
- Transformers: Power of the Primes (2018)
- Guardians of the Galaxy (2019)
- The VeggieTales Show (2019)
- **Lego Jurassic World: Legend of Isla Nublar** (2019–2020)
- T.O.T.S. (2020)
- Thomas & Friends: All Engines Go (2021–2025)

=== Film ===
- Dino Time (2012)

Preceded by Bill Willingham	Robin writer 2006–2007	Succeeded by Brandon Thomas
Preceded by Geoff Johns	Teen Titans writer 2007	Succeeded by Sean McKeever
Preceded by Andersen Gabrych	Batgirl writer 2008–2009	Succeeded by Bryan Q. Miller
Preceded by Hilary J. Bader	Batman Beyond writer 2010–2013	Succeeded by Kyle Higgins
