= Windblade =

Transformers character

- Transformers character
- First appearance: Transformers: Windblade
- Created by: Mairghread Scott
- Voiced by: Abby Trott, Kristy Wu, others

In-universe information
- Affiliation: Autobot

Windblade is a character from the Transformers franchise. She was the result of a fan poll Hasbro held in 2013 and subsequently was featured in her own comic miniseries.

== History ==
Windblade was created as the result of the fan poll held by Hasbro in 2013 in anticipation of the Transformers franchise's 30th anniversary in 2014. The poll allowed fans to choose her design, personality, and abilities. She transforms into a VTOL jet and is a powerful swordswoman. As a result of the poll, she featured in a four-issue comic miniseries written by Mairghread Scott, illustrated by Sarah Stone, and published by IDW Publishing. She also got a toy produced.

The comic miniseries was the first Transformers comic to feature both a female writer and a female illustrator. Scott stated that she wanted the story to emphasize Windblade's optimism and goal to improve Cybertron. Scott described Windblade as "a little bit more of a lone wolf" and more of an ambassador than a fighter.

After her comic debut, Windblade made her television debut in a 2015 episode of Transformers: Robots in Disguise. In the show, she is voiced by Kristy Wu, who described the character as having "stoicism and honor". At the 2015 San Diego Comic-Con, Windblade appeared in a toy set alongside two other female Transformers, Arcee and Chromia, as a team of "Combiner Hunters". The set included an exclusive comic about the trio. Beginning in 2016, Windblade appeared in the Prime Wars Trilogy, in which she is voiced by Abby Trott. She also appears in Transformers: Cyberverse and is the best friend of Bumblebee in this show.

== Reception ==
Upon her reveal, the character saw some online backlash for being a female Transformer. Detractors argued that female Cybertronians should not exist because they are sexless robots, although there have been female Cybertronians in the franchise since the original cartoon. Sarah Carroll, the senior brand manager for Hasbro, stated that "Our female fans have demanded to be part of the story. To have them be represented as well is something that's only natural."
