= List of television programs based on Hasbro properties =

List of television shows

This is a list of television series produced, owned, and/or distributed by Hasbro. Entertainment One was a subsidiary of Hasbro from 2019 to 2023, when the company was sold to Lionsgate in December of that year, and it was renamed as Lionsgate Canada.

== Hasbro Entertainment ==
=== Released series ===
Title	Original run	Network	Co-production with
Dungeons & Dragons (Note: Acquired from The Walt Disney Company.)	1983–1985	CBS	Dungeons & Dragons Entertainment Corp. Marvel Productions; Toei Animation
Spiral Zone (Note: Acquired from Tonka.)	1987	Syndication	Atlantic/Kushner-Locke; The Maltese Companies
Monopoly (Note: Acquired from Parker Brothers.)	1990	ABC	Merv Griffin Enterprises; King World Productions
Toby Terrier and His Video Pals (Note: Acquired from Tiger Electronics.)	1993	Syndication; Direct-to-video	Sid & Marty Krofft Television Productions
Pick Your Brain	1993–1994	Syndication	Marc Summers Productions The Summit Media Group
Beast Wars: Transformers (Note: Rights co-owned with WildBrain.)	1996–1999	Syndication; YTV	Mainframe Entertainment; Alliance Films (seasons 1–2); Alliance Atlantis (season 3)
Beast Machines: Transformers	1999–2000	Fox Kids; YTV	Mainframe Entertainment
Transformers: Armada	2002–2003	TV Tokyo; Cartoon Network	Actas; Studio Galapagos; NAS; Takara
Transformers: Energon	2004–2005	TV Tokyo; Cartoon Network	Actas; Studio A-CAT; Studio Galapagos; Takara
Duel Masters	2004	TV Tokyo; Cartoon Network	Studio Hibari
Peppa Pig (Note: Continued from Contender Entertainment Group (season 1), Rubber Duck Entertainment (season 2), and eOne Family & Brands (seasons 3–7).)	2004–present	Channel 5 Nick Jr.	Astley Baker Davies (series 1–7); Karrot Animation (series 8–present)
Duel Masters: Sacred Lands	2005–2006	Cartoon Network	Studio Hibari
Battle B-Daman	2005–2007	TV Tokyo; Jetix	Nippon Animation
G.I. Joe: Sigma 6	2005–2006	TV Tokyo; 4Kids TV	Gonzo; 4Kids Productions
Transformers: Cybertron	2005–2006	TV Tokyo; Cartoon Network	Gonzo; Takara
Idaten Jump	2005–2006	TV Tokyo; Cartoon Network	Trans Arts; Production I.G
Transformers: Animated	2007–2009	Cartoon Network	Cartoon Network Studios
Trivial Pursuit: America Plays	2008–2009	CBS	Wheeler-Sussman Productions; Debmar-Mercury
G.I. Joe: Resolute	2009	Adult Swim	Titmouse, Inc.
My Little Pony: Tell Your Tale (Note: Continued from eOne Family and Brands.)	2022–2024	YouTube	Lil Critter Workshop
Transformers: EarthSpark (Note: Continued from eOne Family and Brands.)	2022–2024	Paramount+ Nickelodeon	Nickelodeon Animation Studio
Odd-Paw Vet	2023–present	YouTube	Amuse Studios
Power Rangers: Cosmic Fury	2023	Netflix	Power Rangers Productions, Ltd. Toei Company, Ltd.
Scrabble	2024–present	The CW	Mattel Television; Lionsgate Alternative Television
Trivial Pursuit	2024–present	The CW	LeVar Burton Entertainment; Talpa Studios; Lionsgate Alternative Television

=== Upcoming series ===
- Clue (Sony Pictures Television Nonfiction)
- Dungeons & Dragons
- Energon Universe (Skybound Entertainment)
- Magic: The Gathering (Netflix, Legendary Television and Wizards of the Coast)
- Monopoly (Sony Pictures Television Nonfiction)
- Nerf (Sony Pictures Television Nonfiction)
- Risk (Westward)
- My Little Pony: Forever Friendship (Lil Critter Workshop)

== Acquired series ==
=== Sunbow Entertainment ===
Title	Original run	Network	Co-production with
G.I. Joe: A Real American Hero	1983–1986	Syndication	Marvel Productions; Toei Animation
The Transformers	1984–1987	Syndication	Marvel Productions; Toei Animation (seasons 1–3); AKOM (seasons 2–4)
Super Sunday	1985–1986	Syndication	Marvel Productions
Jem and the Holograms	1985–1988	Syndication	Toei Animation; AKOM; Marvel Productions
My Little Pony 'n Friends	1986–1987	Syndication	Marvel Productions
Inhumanoids	1986	Syndication	Marvel Productions; Toei Animation
The Glo Friends	1986–1987	Syndication	Marvel Productions
Potato Head Kids	1986–1987	Syndication	Marvel Productions
MoonDreamers	1986–1987	Syndication	Marvel Productions
Visionaries: Knights of the Magical Light	1987	Syndication	Abrams/Gentile Entertainment, inc. TMS Entertainment
G.I. Joe: A Real American Hero	1989–1992	Syndication	DIC Enterprises
My Little Pony Tales	1992	The Disney Channel	Graz Entertainment; AKOM
Conan the Adventurer	1992–1993	Syndication	Graz Entertainment (season 1); Créativité & Développement (season 2); AB Productions (season 2)
Conan and the Young Warriors	1994	CBS	Graz Entertainment
G.I. Joe Extreme	1995–1997	Syndication	Gunther-Wahl Productions, inc. Graz Entertainment

=== Saban Brands ===
Title	Original run	Network	Co-production with
Mighty Morphin Power Rangers	1993–1995	Fox Kids	Saban Entertainment; Renaissance Atlantic Entertainment; Toei Company, Ltd. MMPR Productions, Inc.
VR Troopers	1994–1996	Syndication	Saban Entertainment; Toei Company, Ltd. Cyberprod, Inc.
Masked Rider	1995–1997	Fox Kids; Syndication	Saban Entertainment; Renaissance Atlantic-Films; Toei Company, Ltd. Bugboy Productions, Inc.
Mighty Morphin Alien Rangers	1996	Fox Kids	Saban Entertainment; Renaissance Atlantic Entertainment; Toei Company, Ltd. MMPR Productions, Inc.
Power Rangers Zeo	1996	Fox Kids	Saban Entertainment; Renaissance Atlantic Entertainment; Toei Company, Ltd. MMPR Productions, Inc.
Big Bad Beetleborgs	1996–1998	Fox Kids	Saban Entertainment; Renaissance Atlantic-Films; Toei Company, Ltd. Bugboy Productions, Inc.
Power Rangers Turbo	1997	Fox Kids	Saban Entertainment; Renaissance Atlantic Entertainment; Toei Company, Ltd. MMPR Productions, Inc.
Ninja Turtles: The Next Mutation (Note: Characters owned by Paramount Global (via Nickelodeon).)	1997–1998	Fox Kids	Saban Entertainment; Mirage Studios
Power Rangers in Space	1998	Fox Kids	Saban Entertainment; Renaissance Atlantic Entertainment; Toei Company, Ltd. MMPR Productions, Inc.
Power Rangers Lost Galaxy	1999	Fox Kids	Saban Entertainment; Renaissance Atlantic Entertainment; Toei Company, Ltd. MMPR Productions, Inc.
Power Rangers Lightspeed Rescue	2000	Fox Kids	Saban Entertainment; Renaissance Atlantic Entertainment; Toei Company, Ltd. MMPR Productions, Inc.
Power Rangers Time Force	2001	Fox Kids	Saban Entertainment; Renaissance Atlantic Entertainment; Toei Company, Ltd. MMPR Productions, Inc.
Cubix: Robots for Everyone	2001–2004	SBS; KBS; Kids' WB	Cinepix; Daewon Media; 4Kids Entertainment
Power Rangers Wild Force	2002	Fox Kids; ABC Kids	Disney Enterprises; BVS Entertainment; Saban Entertainment; Renaissance Atlantic Entertainment; Toei Company, Ltd. MMPR Productions, Inc.
Power Rangers Ninja Storm	2003	ABC Family; ABC Kids	BVS Entertainment; Renaissance Atlantic Entertainment; Toei Company, Ltd. Village Roadshow KP Productions Limited
Power Rangers Dino Thunder	2004	ABC Family; Toon Disney (Jetix); ABC Kids	BVS Entertainment; Renaissance Atlantic Entertainment; Toei Company, Ltd. Village Roadshow KP Productions Limited
Power Rangers S.P.D.	2005	ABC Family; Toon Disney (Jetix); ABC Kids	BVS Entertainment; Renaissance Atlantic Entertainment; Toei Company, Ltd. Ranger Productions, Ltd.
Power Rangers Mystic Force	2006	Toon Disney (Jetix); ABC Kids	BVS Entertainment; Renaissance Atlantic Entertainment; Toei Company, Ltd. Ranger Productions, Ltd.
Power Rangers Operation Overdrive	2007	Toon Disney (Jetix); ABC Kids	BVS Entertainment; Renaissance Atlantic Entertainment; Toei Company, Ltd. Ranger Productions, Ltd.
Power Rangers Jungle Fury	2008	Toon Disney (Jetix); ABC Kids	BVS Entertainment; Renaissance Atlantic Entertainment; Toei Company, Ltd. Ranger Productions, Ltd.
Power Rangers RPM	2009	ABC Kids	BVS Entertainment; Renaissance Atlantic Entertainment; Toei Company, Ltd. Ranger Productions, Ltd.
Mighty Morphin Power Rangers (re-version)	2010	ABC Kids	BVS Entertainment; Renaissance Atlantic Entertainment; Toei Company, Ltd. MMPR Productions, Inc.
Power Rangers Samurai	2011–2012	Nickelodeon	SCG Power Rangers; Power Rangers Productions, Ltd. Toei Company, Ltd.
Power Rangers Megaforce	2013–2014	Nickelodeon	SCG Power Rangers; Power Rangers Productions, Ltd. Toei Company, Ltd.
Digimon Fusion	2013–2015	Nickelodeon; Nicktoons; Vortexx	Toei Animation; Saban Brands; Studiopolis
Julius Jr.	2013–2015	Nick Jr.	Saban Brands; BrainPower Studio
Power Rangers Dino Charge	2015–2016	Nickelodeon	SCG Power Rangers; Power Rangers Productions, Ltd. Toei Company, Ltd.
Popples	2015–2016	Netflix; Discovery Family	Saban Brands; Method Animation; Zagtoon; Umedia; Netflix
Glitter Force	2015–2016	Netflix	Toei Animation; Saban Brands; Studiopolis
Luna Petunia	2016–2018	Netflix; Discovery Family	Cirque du Soleil; Saban Brands; BrainPower Studio
Power Rangers Ninja Steel	2017–2018	Nickelodeon	SCG Power Rangers; Power Rangers Productions, Ltd. Toei Company, Ltd.
Kibaoh Klashers	2017	Netflix	Saban Brands
Glitter Force: Doki-Doki	2017	Netflix	Toei Animation; Saban Brands; Studiopolis

=== eOne Kids & Family ===
Title	Original run	Network	Co-production with
Tractor Tom	2002–2004	CITV	Contender Entertainment Group; Hibbert Ralph Entertainment
Humf	2008–2011	Nick Jr.	King Rollo Films; Rubber Duck Entertainment
Ben & Holly's Little Kingdom (Note: Continued from Rubber Duck Entertainment (season 1), and eOne Family & Brands (seasons 1–2).)	2009–2013	Channel 5 Nick Jr.	Astley Baker Davies; The Elf Factory Limited (season 1); Gaston's Cave Ltd (season 2)
PJ Masks	2015–present	Disney Channel & Disney Junior; France 5 & TF1	Frog Box; TeamTO
Winston Steinburger and Sir Dudley Ding Dong	2016–2017	ABC Me; Teletoon	Sticky Pictures
Cupcake & Dino: General Services	2018–2019	Netflix; Teletoon	Birdo Studio; Atomic Cartoons; Corus Entertainment
Transformers: Cyberverse (Note: Continued from Allspark Animation (seasons 1–3).)	2018–2021	Cartoon Network (seasons 1–3); Netflix (season 4); YouTube	Boulder Media
Ricky Zoom	2019–2021	Gulli; Rai; Youku Kids; Nick Jr.	TeamTO; Youku Kids; Frog Box; Rai Ragazzi; Maga Animation Studio
Alien TV	2019–2021	9Go! Netflix	Pop Family Entertainment; Snowball Studios
My Little Pony: Pony Life	2020–2021	Discovery Family; Treehouse TV	Boulder Media
Transformers: War for Cybertron Trilogy (Note: Continued from Allspark Animation (season 1).)	2020–2021	Netflix	Rooster Teeth Studios; Polygon Pictures
Power Rangers Dino Fury	2021–2022	Nickelodeon (season 1); Netflix (season 2)	Power Rangers Productions, Ltd. Toei Company, Ltd.
Ninja Express	2021–2022	Ketnet; Gulli; CBBC	Frog Box; Creative Conspiracy
Transformers: BotBots	2022	Netflix	Boulder Media
My Little Pony: Make Your Mark	2022–2023	Netflix	Atomic Cartoons
Kiya and the Kimoja Heroes	2023–2024	Disney Jr.	Triggerfish Animation Studios; Frog Box; TeamTO
Power Rangers: Cosmic Fury	2023	Netflix	Power Rangers Productions, Ltd. Toei Company, Ltd.

== See also ==
- List of films based on Hasbro properties
- List of Lionsgate Television programs

Studios

- Hasbro Entertainment
  - Claster Television
  - Allspark
  - Saban Brands
