= List of Transformers: Robots in Disguise (2015 TV series) episodes =

Episode list for an animated series

Transformers: Robots in Disguise is an American animated television series, developed by Adam Beechen, Duane Capizzi and Jeff Kline. The series' first 13 episodes were released online on December 31, 2014, on 1905.com in mainland China (excluding Hong Kong) and dubbed in Mandarin Chinese. The series first premiered on television on February 9, 2015, on Canal J in France. In the United States, the series has been broadcast on Cartoon Network since its debut on March 14, 2015. The series serves as a stand-alone sequel to Transformers: Prime, taking place a few years after it with an overall more lighthearted tone.

The series focuses on Bumblebee who, following the events of Prime, has become a police officer on Cybertron. While on a mission, he sees a vision of Optimus Prime telling him to go to Earth as a terrible evil is coming. Joining him on the mission are his cadet partner Strongarm and the rebellious Sideswipe. Following their arrival on Earth, the three of them are tasked with capturing Decepticons who were released from their stasis pods when their prison ship, the Alchemor, crash landed. The trio is also aided by the humans Russell and Denny Clay, the Dinobot Grimlock, and the Minicon Fixit. Later, they are joined by the former Decepticon-turned-Autobot bounty hunter Drift, with his Minicon pupils Slipstream and Jetstorm, and the spiritual Windblade who is on a mission by the Transformers' god Primus. The first season, consisting of 26 episodes, concluded with the revival of Optimus.

A second season, consisting of 13 episodes began airing on February 20, 2016, and saw Bumblebee's team, or Bee Team, attempting to apprehend the remaining escaped Decepticons and the discovery that the Alchemor was cut in half upon crashing on Earth, leading to the creation of a different Decepticon group. The season also features the return of Soundwave and Ratchet from Transformers: Prime—the former appearing for one episode while the latter appears in the two-part finale. A miniseries, consisting of six episodes, premiered in October 2016 and features the return of Starscream, placing him as the main antagonist. In April 2017, the series' third season, entitled Combiner Force, began airing and focuses on Bee Team's realization that they can combine into the Combiner, Ultra Bee, as well as the arrival of the Stunticons, who are also capable of combining. Soundwave also plans to return with the help of Activators, a new breed of Minicons.

The series concluded with its third season and was replaced with the new series, Transformers: Cyberverse. Presently, only the first season of the series has been released as a complete DVD set, in 3 Regions, which are Region 1, Region 2 and Region 4.

== Series overview ==
Season	Episodes	Originally released	
Season	Episodes	First released	Last released
1	26	March 14, 2015	September 12, 2015
2	13	February 20, 2016	May 14, 2016
Miniseries	6	October 22, 2016	December 3, 2016
3	26	April 29, 2017	November 11, 2017

== Episodes ==
=== Season 1 (2015) ===
No. overall	No. in season	Title	Directed by	Written by	Original release date	US viewers (millions)
1	1	"Pilot, Part 1"	David Hartman	Adam Beechen & Duane Capizzi	December 31, 2014 (Mainland China); March 14, 2015 (United States)	1.02
While helping Strongarm to apprehend Sideswipe, Bumblebee gets a vision of Optimus Prime that draws him back to Earth with Strongarm and Sideswipe along for the ride. He finds that the Decepticon prison ship Alchemor has crash-landed on Earth and its Decepticon inmates have escaped. After using a Space Bridge to arrive on Earth, the three discover a lone Chompazoid called Underbite. They eventually engage in a brawl with him, but they unwittingly endanger two humans, Denny Clay and his son Russell.
2	2	"Pilot, Part 2"	David Hartman	Adam Beechen & Duane Capizzi	December 31, 2014 (Mainland China); March 14, 2015 (United States)	1.01
Upon allying with the Minicon Fixit and the Decepticon prisoner Grimlock, Bumblebee leads them, Strongarm and Sideswipe in rounding up the escaped Decepticon prisoners, starting with the car-dinosaur Underbite. Their hunt for Underbite leads to them befriending Denny Clay and his son Russell. All of them must struggle to stop the metal-eating Decepticon, who intends on devouring the nearby Crown City.
3	3	"Trust Exercises"	Scooter Tidwell	Adam Beechen & Marsha Griffin	December 31, 2014 (Mainland China); April 4, 2015 (United States)	0.72
While Bumblebee works to get Grimlock and the rest of the team to trust each other, they two of them must work together when the pirate Sharkticon Hammerstrike has been targeting oil tankers to recreate his home environment. Meanwhile, the rest of the team has an encounter with Steeljaw, a charismatic Decepticon who wishes to make Earth the inhabitation of all the Alchemor inmates.
4	4	"More Than Meets the Eye"	Vinton Heuck	Nicole Dubuc & Steven Melching	December 31, 2014 (Mainland China); April 11, 2015 (United States)	0.97
As Russell nervously tries befriending the neighborhood kids playing football, Fixit, who wishes to get his first field assignment gets in over his head when it comes to catching the combiner Decepticon prisoner Chop Shop, who plans to construct a spaceship to take-off the Earth and wreak havoc.
5	5	"W.W.O.D.?"	Todd Waterman	Guy Toubes	December 31, 2014 (Mainland China); April 18, 2015 (United States)	0.90
Bumblebee must learn to lead in his own way as the team struggles to bring in a brutish Decepticon prisoner named Terrashock, whose stasis pod has been discovered by human authorities.
6	6	"As the Kospego Commands!"	Scooter Tidwell	Michael Ryan	December 31, 2014 (Mainland China); April 25, 2015 (United States)	0.71
Sideswipe's loyalty to the team comes into question as he and Bumblebee track down a Decepticon crime boss named Thunderhoof, who wishes to complete a Space Bridge to Cybertron.
7	7	"Collect 'Em All"	Vinton Heuck	Steven Melching	December 31, 2014 (Mainland China); May 2, 2015 (United States)	1.00
As Denny and Russell work to stave off a greedy memorabilia collector named Larry LaRue, Bumblebee's team must chase a collector of their own in the form of a kleptomaniac, avian Decepticon named Filch who has an impulsive urge to hoard all things "shiny".
8	8	"True Colors"	Todd Waterman	Mairghread Scott	December 31, 2014 (Mainland China); May 9, 2015 (United States)	1.06
When Grimlock suddenly starts attacking his teammates, Bumblebee must figure out why their Dinobot teammate has turned from friend to foe. They discover that the prisoner Minitron, who has been working for Steeljaw to retrieve the stasis cell of Underbite, is behind Grimlock's rampage.
9	9	"Rumble in the Jungle"	Scooter Tidwell	Dean Stefan	December 31, 2014 (Mainland China); May 16, 2015 (United States)	0.90
While Strongarm's first "solo" mission in South America to catch the Decepticon prisoner Springload, who is obsessed with finding the mythical, lost city of Doradus to claim its treasure, is marred by an over-protective Bumblebee, Denny and Fixit's rivalry comes to a head.
10	10	"Can You Dig It?"	Vinton Heuck	Stan Berkowitz	December 31, 2014 (Mainland China); May 23, 2015 (United States)	0.80
Bumblebee's group welcomes a visiting Autobot veteran named Jazz just in time to fend off the Decepticon fugitive Ped who is bent on monopolizing one of the Bots' most precious commodities, the Energon cubes.
11	11	"Adventures in Bumblebee-Sitting!"	Todd Waterman	Michael Ryan	December 31, 2014 (Mainland China); May 30, 2015 (United States)	0.63
While in pursuit of the rebellious Decepticon anarchist Quillfire, Bumblebee is exposed to one of Quillfire's toxic quills that impacts his maturity, leaving the rest of the team to deal with both an escaped fugitive and a hyperactive leader.
12	12	"Hunting Season"	Scooter Tidwell	David McDermott	December 31, 2014 (Mainland China); June 6, 2015 (United States)	0.78
When the Autobot bounty hunter Drift, his Minicons Jetstorm and Slipstream, and the Decepticon bounty hunter Fracture, with his Minicons Airazor and Divebomb, land on Earth, Bumblebee discovers that there is a price on his head. Drift and Bumblebee retain a short alliance while they are being targeted by Fracture.
13	13	"Out of Focus"	Vinton Heuck	Adam Beechen	December 31, 2014 (Mainland China); June 13, 2015 (United States)	0.85
Bumblebee's group works to bring in a group of Skunkticon Thieves led by Malodor. Meanwhile, in the Realm of the Primes, Optimus Prime prepares himself for an evil that will threaten both Earth and Cybertron while being trained by the first Minicon, Micronus Prime.
14	14	"Sideways"	Frank Marino	Steven Melching	June 20, 2015	0.74
Bumblebee's group encounter the crab-like Decepticon Clampdown, who inadvertently leads them to Steeljaw, who has Underbite, Thunderhoof, and Fracture on his side. A battle ensues in one of Crown City's landfills, in which Bumblebee faces a near-death experience.
15	15	"Even Robots Have Nightmares"	Vinton Heuck	John Loy	June 27, 2015	0.83
Denny and the Autobots are captured by a murderous, vampire Deception called Nightstrike in the cave system outside Crown City who brings their worst fears to life with his sonic scream. Now, a panic-stricken Russell has to race against time to rescue them.
16	16	"Some Body, Any Body"	Todd Waterman	Mairghread Scott	July 4, 2015	0.65
After Sideswipe is abducted by an insane scientist called Vertebreak, in the Crown City subway, Vertebreak performs a surgery to graft his head into Sideswipe's body. As the other members of Bumblebee's team must find Vertebreak in order to get Sideswipe's head back onto his body, the young Autobot must learn that he can’t always rely on his physical prowess.
17	17	"One of Our Mini-Cons Is Missing"	Scooter Tidwell	Zac Atkinson	July 11, 2015	0.70
Drift returns to Earth in pursuit of a disgruntled, runaway Jetstorm, who left without reason. At the same time, Bumblebee's team faces Springload and Quillfire who have escaped from their stasis cells. Springload's madness for the search of Doradus leads Quillfire to steal a giant experimental tank form a military base, proving a difficult challenge for the team.
18	18	"Deep Trouble"	Frank Marino	Howie Nicoll	July 18, 2015	0.85
Unaware that Grimlock hides a serious injury, Bumblebee and the team make their way to the ocean in pursuit of an escaped aquatic Decepticon named Octopunch, who retreats to a Cybertronian spacecraft to activate its engines and leave Earth.
19	19	"The Champ"	Vinton Heuck	Steven Melching	July 25, 2015	0.70
Former gladiator-turned-Decepticon Groundpounder escapes and takes part in a televised fight in the Rumbledome stadium and the Autobots have to depend on Grimlock and his brawn to help defeat him and his devious coach Headlock.
20	20	"The Trouble with Fixit"	Todd Waterman	Alex Irvine	August 1, 2015	0.60
Fixit becomes increasingly buggy. Denny tries to repair him but it goes horribly wrong, wakes his guard program and converts Fixit into a fully weaponized and lethal prison guard who mistakes the Bee Team for Decepticon fugitives. Armed with an arsenal, he tries to attack the others. Meanwhile, Chop Shop's right arm component makes another attempt to free the rest of Chop Shop and succeeds in causing more troubles for Bumblebee's group.
21	21	"Lockout"	Scooter Tidwell	Guy Toubes	August 8, 2015	0.83
Steeljaw and his group manage to get into the scrapyard to release their fellow Decepticon prisoners that the Autobots have captured up to now and establish a sonic field around the scrapyard which the Autobots cannot penetrate. Our heroes will have to show cunning to thwart the Decepticons' plan and regain control of the scrapyard.
22	22	"Similarly Different"	Frank Marino	Derek Dressler	August 15, 2015	0.79
Grimlock discovers another Dinobot fugitive named Scowl with whom he sympathizes. A restless Grimlock ponders returning to his old habits and decides to help Scowl flee but it does not take long for Scowl to start causing destruction and terrorizing the humans, having been hired by Thunderhoof on Cybertron. The heroes will have to join forces to stop Scowl. Meanwhile, Denny redecorates a motor home for Russell who is afraid that his father will build it his own way.
23	23	"The Buzz on Windblade"	Todd Waterman	Mairghread Scott	August 22, 2015	0.86
Sideswipe meets an ancient Autobot named Windblade on a mission for Primus after she has just defeated a Decepticon. She agrees to team up with Bumblebee's group to bring in a Decepticon named Zizza, who desires to spread her toxin through airports in order to hypnotize humans and take over the world.
24	24	"Ghosts and Impostors"	Scooter Tidwell	John Loy	August 29, 2015	0.72
When Bumblebee decides to show his team the beauty of Earth, he takes them to a ghost town called Edmond Ville in the Far West where the shape-shifting Decepticon Pseudo awaits them. As they wander through the town, Bumblebee's group gets into various hijinks and trigger multiple traps. Afterwards, Bumblebee finds his team fighting something that isn not really there and stops them. They are informed by Fixit that they are dealing with a Decepticon that is able to change his appearance. Despite Pseudo opening up various holes in the ground, in an attempt to trap Bumblebee's team, they manage to escape and defeat him.
25	25	"Battlegrounds, Part 1"	Frank Marino	David McDermott	September 5, 2015	0.70
Bumblebee's team finds themselves in trouble when Strongarm, Windblade and Sideswipe are captured by Steeljaw's pack. In the wake of a coming threat to Earth the Primes decide to send Optimus there despite his training not being yet complete. The Bee Team must prevent Steeljaw's pack from teleporting that same threat onto Earth.
26	26	"Battlegrounds, Part 2"	Vinton Heuck	Adam Beechen	September 12, 2015	0.73
Megatronus, the Fallen, has returned from exile and prepares to send both Earth and Cybertron into oblivion. Bumblebee's team, reunited with newly revived Optimus Prime must use everything they have learned to save both worlds from annihilation.

=== Season 2 (2016) ===
No. overall	No. in season	Title	Directed by	Written by	Original release date	US viewers (millions)
27	1	"Overloaded, Part 1"	Scooter Tidwell	Adam Beechen	February 20, 2016	0.66
Optimus is weakened when Micronus suddenly strips him of the power of the Primes. Despite the rest of the Autobots' worry, Optimus insists that he can continue to be of service. A Decepticon shows up in the Arctic Circle, with Optimus, Drift, Windblade, and Sideswipe heading after him while Bumblebee, Strongarm, Fixit, and Grimlock stay behind and are soon ambushed by an ancient Decepticon named Overload, who holds a grudge against Optimus for defeating him several years ago. The Autobots thus have to cope with a global Decepticon threat and a weakened Optimus.
28	2	"Overloaded, Part 2"	Frank Marino	Adam Beechen	February 27, 2016	0.58
Bumblebee continues to chase after Overload with Grimlock and Strongarm not too far behind, while Optimus and his group continue to pursue Polarclaw and battle against the elements in the Arctic.
29	3	"Metal Meltdown"	Vinton Heuck	Guy Toubes	March 5, 2016	0.80
While the team tries to apprehend a new Decepticon named Saberhorn, Strongarm and Grimlock try to recreate the teamwork she and Sideswipe had. Meanwhile, Steeljaw, who survived the disaster with Megatronus, discovers another group of escaped prisoners led by two new Decepticons.
30	4	"Suspended"	Todd Waterman	Mairghread Scott	March 12, 2016	0.79
After making a mistake in the field, Strongarm removes herself from active duty just as the team contends with the Decepticon arsonists Crazybolt and Slicedice.
31	5	"Cover Me"	Scooter Tidwell	Len Wein	March 19, 2016	0.70
Windblade's concern for Optimus' well being puts the Away Team at risk as they battle Razorpaw and his Minicons, Swelter and Glacius, who have the ability to manipulate temperature.
32	6	"Brainpower"	Frank Marino	David McDermott	March 26, 2016	0.75
Grimlock attempts to make himself smarter by absorbing information from a Cybertronian data cylinder into his processor, but something goes wrong and puts the team at a disadvantage as they battle the Decepticon scientist Simacore and his Minicons Axiom and Theorem.
33	7	"Misdirection"	Vinton Heuck	Guy Toubes	March 27, 2016 (United Kingdom); April 2, 2016 (United States)	0.61
The team obtains more clues that lead them to Decepticon Island as Steeljaw has a clever plan to infiltrate the scrapyard. Bumblebee, Grimlock and Strongarm confront Scorponok and his Minicons Bludgeon and Clout, the leader of the island, as well as Crazybolt and Slicedice.
34	8	"Bumblebee's Night Off"	Todd Waterman	Mairghread Scott	April 2, 2016 (United Kingdom); April 9, 2016 (United States)	0.73
Bumblebee is persuaded to go to a concert of one of his favorite bands, hoping for a relaxing evening outside of the scrapyard. Unfortunately, when Bisk and his Minicons Hammer and Anvil attack the stadium, he attempts to prevent them from harming anyone while also trying to remain unnoticed by the humans in the stadium.
35	9	"Impounded"	Scooter Tidwell	Johnny Hartmann	April 3, 2016 (United Kingdom); April 16, 2016 (United States)	0.62
While Bumblebee and Strongarm are stuck in an impound lot, Grimlock's search for a better camouflage is running at full speed when Quillfire returns with Minicons Back and Forth.
36	10	"Portals"	Frank Marino	David McDermott	April 9, 2016 (United Kingdom); April 23, 2016 (United States)	0.76
Fixit's attempt to carry out groundbridge repairs goes wrong when he, to his dismay, accidentally summons Soundwave and Laserbeak to the scrapyard. Meanwhile, Bumblebee is banished and trapped within the Shadowzone.
37	11	"Graduation Exercises"	Vinton Heuck	Martin Fisher	April 10, 2016 (United Kingdom); April 30, 2016 (United States)	0.71
Slipstream and Jetstorm accidentally expose Drift to danger when attempting to prove that they can work effectively without their teacher, as the Away Team battles Stockade and his troops.
38	12	"Decepticon Island, Part 1"	Todd Waterman	Adam Beechen	April 16, 2016 (United Kingdom); May 7, 2016 (United States)	0.66
As the two Autobot teams are reunited, Ratchet returns with the Minicon Undertone as they find the Decepticons' headquarters and that Steeljaw is leading a Decepticon guerilla army.
39	13	"Decepticon Island, Part 2"	Scooter Tidwell	Adam Beechen	April 16, 2016 (United Kingdom); May 14, 2016 (United States)	0.64
As the severely outnumbered Autobots fight to bring Steeljaw's army down, tensions rise between Bumblebee and Optimus, which could jeopardize the mission and put the world at risk.

=== Miniseries (2016) ===
No. overall	No. in season	Title	Directed by	Written by	Original release date	US viewers (millions)
40	1	"History Lessons"	Todd Waterman	Adam Beechen	September 10, 2016 (Canada); October 22, 2016 (United States)	0.64
A visit to an old Autobot base, reveals a new enemy with plans of his own.
41	2	"Strongarm's Big Score"	Vinton Heuck	David McDermott	September 17, 2016 (Canada); October 29, 2016 (United States)	0.64
An attempt to impress Fixit turns dangerous when Strongarm encounters another member of the Scavengers.
42	3	"Pretzel Logic"	Scooter Tidwell	Will Friedle	September 24, 2016 (Canada); November 5, 2016 (United States)	0.57
As the Bee Team continues their relic hunt, Grimlock encounters a surprising new ally.
43	4	"Mighty Big Trouble"	Frank Marino	Johnny Hartmann	October 1, 2016 (Canada); November 12, 2016 (United States)	0.64
The Scavengers come across the long discarded Dark Star Saber, which Starscream is more than happy to put to his own use.
44	5	"Mini-Con Madness"	Todd Waterman	Adam Beechen	October 8, 2016 (Canada); November 19, 2016 (United States)	0.66
Optimus Prime returns and leads the Bee Team to rescue Bumblebee, Fixit, Slipstream, and Jetstorm from Starscream and his bounty hunters. The team split up and end up teaming up with the Mini-Con Weaponizers. Unfortunately the Scavengers get in the way of the group"s rescue efforts. Meanwhile, Fixit and Drift's students try to escape and Starscream reveals his revenge plans to Bumblebee.
45	6	"Worthy"	Vinton Heuck	Adam Beechen	October 15, 2016 (Canada); December 3, 2016 (United States)	0.56
The Autobots battle to stop Starscream from Power Surge linking with all seven of the Mini-Con Weaponizers and gaining ultimate power.

=== Season 3 (2017) ===
No. overall	No. in season	Title	Directed by	Written by	Original release date	US viewers (millions)
46	1	"King of the Hill, Part 1"	Scooter Tidwell	Adam Beechen	April 25, 2017 (France); April 29, 2017 (United States)	0.73
Overconfidence leaves the Bee Team unprepared when they face a Stunticon that can fire guided missiles on the desert ground above a nuclear waste disposal site.
47	2	"King of the Hill, Part 2"	Frank Marino	Adam Beechen	April 25, 2017 (France); April 29, 2017 (United States)	0.71
The harried Autobots' Stunticon enemy proves more formidable and crafty than they anticipated, using his guided missiles to threaten a nuclear waste disposal site. Soundwave also show signs of an imminent return when he sends Stuntwing, a Mini-Con, to steal Bumblebee's Decepticon Hunter.
48	3	"Defrosted"	Todd Waterman	Guy Toubes	April 25, 2017 (France); May 6, 2017 (United States)	0.63
Grimlock begs to learn new fighting methods from reluctant teacher Drift and puts them into action when the Autobots travel to the Antarctic to battle the Decepticon Crustacion, who has been unfrozen from a melting glacier. Soundwave also sends Trickout, another Mini-Con, to Earth to retrieve the other Decepticon Hunters from Strongarm and Sideswipe.
49	4	"Blurred"	Vinton Heuck	Johnny Hartmann	April 25, 2017 (France); May 13, 2017 (United States)	0.54
After his reckless actions cause the Sharkticon scientist Ragebyte to go free, Sideswipe works to capture him in fear of being replaced by the Rescue Bot Blurr.
50	5	"Sphere of Influence"	Scooter Tidwell	David McDermott	May 20, 2017	0.57
After taking down a Skunkticon named Zorillor, the Bee Team discovers a mysterious sphere that alters the minds of any Cybertronian in its vicinity, turning the Autobots against one another. Things escalate when Springload gets his hands on it, hoping that the sphere will finally lead him to the mythical city of Doradus.
51	6	"Bee Cool"	Frank Marino	Zac Atkinson	May 27, 2017	0.58
Bumblebee, trying to prove that he can be as cool as Sideswipe and his intern Blurr, struggles to lead the Autobots against two Stunticons who stole a trailer full of Cybertronian weapons.
52	7	"The Great Divide"	Todd Waterman	Andrew R. Robinson	June 3, 2017	0.49
A freak combiner accident causes Sideswipe to split into two individuals, causing problems when the Bee Team tries to take in Dragstrip, who has acquired a gravitic adjuster. Meanwhile, thanks to Trickout, Soundwave acquires Sideswipe's Decepticon hunter.
53	8	"Get a Clue"	Vinton Heuck	Matt Wayne	June 10, 2017	0.68
Strongarm flexes her detective muscles to solve a baffling series of Decepticon thefts; she may need to stand up to her teammates in order to bring a couple of perps to justice.
54	9	"Out of the Shadows"	Scooter Tidwell	Brian Hohlfeld	June 17, 2017	0.69
The Bee Team learns about Drift's past when his former mentor Shadow Raker comes to Earth to recover something Drift has taken from him - Slipstream and Jetstorm.
55	10	"Disordered Personalities"	Frank Marino	Shannon Eric Denton	June 24, 2017	0.58
An experiment in combining accidentally causes the Autobots to temporarily swap personalities. Temporarily stuck in the wrong bodies, the team is called on a mission to defeat the Stunticons in a road race.
56	11	"Guilty as Charged"	Todd Waterman	David McDermott	July 15, 2017 (United Kingdom); July 29, 2017 (United States)	0.56
Strongarm worries that her Academy classmate Nightra may still harbor a grudge, but when a powerful foe comes after her old friend, Strongarm and the Bee Team put their sparks on the line to protect her. Soundwave also swears revenge on Hi-Test, one of his former Activator Mini-Cons, when he failed to acquire Strongarm's Decepticon Hunter.
57	12	"The Golden Knight"	Vinton Heuck	Dan Salgarolo	July 16, 2017 (United Kingdom); August 12, 2017 (United States)	0.45
An ancient Cybertronian signal sends Bumblebee and chivalry-obsessed Fixit to a remote English island for a routine scouting mission that quickly turns into the duo's very own call to adventure.
58	13	"The Fastest Bot Alive!"	Scooter Tidwell	Eric Lewald & Julia Lewald	July 22, 2017 (United Kingdom); August 12, 2017 (United States)	0.44
Grimlock acquires uncontrollable Super Speed, which proves to be a problem when the Autobots have to deal with a revenge-minded Simacore and his army of Mini-Con clones.
59	14	"Railroad Rage"	Frank Marino	Len Uhley	August 5, 2017 (Canada); August 19, 2017 (United States)	0.69
A runaway train's fusion engine is up for grabs and the Stunticons are in pursuit, so the Bee Team must do all it can to prevent them from getting the cargo. An additional threat arises as the train could potentially crash into Crown City Train Station. Soundwave also acquires Strongarm's Decepticon Hunter, thanks to another one of his Activator Minicons, Goldgear, inadvertently tipping off Bumblebee and his team.
60	15	"Combine and Conquer"	Todd Waterman	Guy Toubes	August 12, 2017 (Canada); August 26, 2017 (United States)	0.55
Bee’s new leadership style is put to the test when Motormaster and the Stunticons go after a Meteorite Deflector Dish; the Bee Team is forced to combine and improvise together to take on Menasor.
61	16	"Moon Breaker"	Vinton Heuck	Johnny Hartmann	August 19, 2017 (Canada); September 2, 2017 (United States)	0.52
Optimus Prime arrives to recruit Drift for a special mission, sparking a competition between Sideswipe and Strongarm over who would be better suited to take Drift’s spot; the Autobots go to the Moon to recover a dangerous weapon.
62	17	"Exiles"	Scooter Tidwell	Mairghread Scott	August 26, 2017 (Canada); September 9, 2017 (United States)	0.56
Steeljaw and his pack return and launch an attack on the Scrapyard, forcing the Autobots to abandon their home base; Sideswipe’s fear of abandonment threatens the Bee Team when they face their foes again at the Crown River Dam.
63	18	"Breathing Room"	Frank Marino	Julie McNally Cahill & Tim Cahill	September 16, 2017	0.54
Bumblebee, Sideswipe, and Strongarm are captured by Steeljaw's Decepticons; Fixit works to keep Steeljaw and the 'Cons at bay while the captured Autobots attempt to escape.
64	19	"Prepare for Departure"	Todd Waterman	Len Wein	September 23, 2017	0.46
The Bee Team struggle to recover a canister with radioactive fuel rods from Steeljaw and his pack, while Grimlock struggles to learn the difference between work and play.
65	20	"Prisoner Principles"	Vinton Heuck	Zac Atkinson	September 30, 2017	0.50
Strongarm struggles with the correct way to treat a prisoner while also helping the Bee team keep Steeljaw and his pack from wreaking havoc at the nuclear power plant. Soundwave contacts Steeljaw and his Pack, ordering that the terms of their freedom, as a reward for the deal they struck with their mysterious 'Benefactors' on Cybertron, and their command would be transferred to him.
66	21	"Collateral Damage"	Scooter Tidwell	Paul Giacoppo	October 7, 2017	0.47
Soundwave finally escapes the Shadowzone to set up a Beacon Generator intended to summon Megatron. While the Bee Team engages the notorious Decepticon atop a skyscraper, Optimus Prime takes on Laserbeak in the skies over Crown City. Sideswipe learns a lesson in considering the consequences of his actions. Optimus also makes contact with Hi-Test, the Renegade Activator, who now lives in the Shadowzone with his fellow Activators, free from those who would dare threaten them.
67	22	"Something He Ate"	Frank Marino	David McDermott	October 14, 2017	0.52
When Underbite eats part of the Autobots' GroundBridge, the Bee Team has to chase the teleporting Decepticon through various locations.
68	23	"Sick as a Bot"	Todd Waterman	Will Friedle	October 21, 2017	0.56
After the Energon seeker Wingcode infects the Autobots with a virus, Bulkhead joins Grimlock in his hunt for the Decepticon.
69	24	"Five Fugitives"	Vinton Heuck	Matthew Wilson	October 28, 2017	0.55
The Autobots' pursuit of Steeljaw hits an unexpected roadblock when Strongarm's old mentor Detective Dropforge arrives from Cybertron with orders to arrest the Bee Team.
70	25	"Enemy of My Enemy"	Scooter Tidwell	Adam Beechen	October 29, 2017 (United Kingdom); November 4, 2017 (United States)	0.56
When Optimus returns with old friends and dire warnings of a Cybertronian invasion of Earth, the Autobots must split up to defend their old home and their new one, with the Bee Team returning to Cybertron, while Optimus and his All-Stars stay behind to defend against the invasion's advanced force. Steeljaw also offers assistance, but can he be trusted?
71	26	"Freedom Fighters"	Frank Marino	Adam Beechen	November 4, 2017 (United Kingdom); November 11, 2017 (United States)	0.57
As the Bee Team struggles to liberate Cybertron from the High Council, Optimus and his All-Stars fight back the advance force of an Earth-bound Cybertronian invasion.

== Online shorts ==
No.	Title	Original release date
1	"Fixit Jam"	April 29, 2015
Russell and Grimlock try to find Fixit.
2	"To Catch a Phrase"	May 13, 2015
Bumblebee's search for a catchphrase continues.
3	"Sticky Situation"	May 26, 2015
Denny gets sauce all over Bumblebee.
4	"Carjacked!"	June 23, 2015
A car thief has a bad night after stealing a sports car.
5	"Perfect"	June 23, 2015
Grimlock discovers his signature weapon.
6	"Knock, Knock!"	October 28, 2015
Fracture discovers some new Mini-Cons.
7	"The Power of Dibs"	October 28, 2015
Slipstream and Jetstream learn about an ancient ritual.
8	"Back and Forth"	November 6, 2015
Airazor and Divebomb try to recruit the Cyclones.
9	"The Tragedy of Slipstream"	November 6, 2015
Slipstream remembers why he became a criminal.
10	"A Level Playing Field"	November 6, 2015
It's a Mini-Con melee as both sides vie for control of the Cyclones.
11	"Two Plus Two Equals More"	November 6, 2015
The Autobot and Decepticon Mini-Cons form a temporary truce.

== DVD releases ==
DVD releases of Transformers: Robots in Disguise
Season	DVD release dates	
Season	Region 1	Region 2
Season 1 (2015)	May 10, 2016	October 15, 2017
Season 2 (2016)	None	None
Miniseries (2016)	None	None
Season 3 (2017)	None	None
