= Trivial Pursuit (disambiguation) =

Trivial Pursuit is a board game based on a player's ability to answer general knowledge and popular culture questions.

Trivial Pursuit may also refer to:

- Television shows based on the board game
  - Trivial Pursuit (American game show)
  - Trivial Pursuit (British game show)
  - Trivial Pursuit: America Plays
- Trivial Pursuit: Unhinged, 2004 video game

== See also ==
- List of Trivial Pursuit editions
