= Trivia (disambiguation) =

Trivia is information and data that are considered to be of little value.

Trivia may also refer to:

- Trivia (album), a 1986 album by Utopia
- Trivia (gastropod), a genus of small sea snails in the family Triviidae
- Trivia, an epithet of the Roman goddesses Diana and Hecate, in their shared role as protector of the crossroads (trivia, “three ways”).
- Trivia (poem), a poem by John Gay
- "Trivia" (The Office), an episode of The Office

== See also ==
- Triviality (mathematics), technical simplicity of some aspects of proofs
- Quantum triviality, a trait of classical theories that become trivial when viewed in quantum terms
- Parkinson's law of triviality
- Trivial (film), a 2007 film
- Trivial name, a type of name in chemical nomenclature
- Trivialism
- Trivial Pursuit (disambiguation)
- Trivium (disambiguation)
