= Transformers: Cyberworld =

American animated web series

- Genre: Action; Adventure; Comedy; Science Fiction; Isekai
- Based on: Transformers by Hasbro and Tomy
- Developed by: Ali Lightfoot
- Written by: Ali Lightfoot; Ryan Denham; Gretchen Mallorie; Tom Gidman
- Voices of: Kyle Kaczmarczyk; Jessica Carroll; James Alexander; Jack Ayres; Shogo Miyakita; Andres Williams; Si Rawlinson
- Composer: Daniel Dobbs
- Countries of origin: United Kingdom; United States; Singapore
- Original language: English
- No. of seasons: 2
- No. of episodes: 78

Production
- Executive producers: Tom Hartley; Tayhan Mustafa; Rob Doherty ^{(Season 2)}
- Producers: Lili Shi (creative producer); Charles Agbaje (consulting creative producer) ^{(Season 1)}
- Running time: 5 minutes
- Production companies: Omens Studios; Hasbro Entertainment

Original release
- Network: YouTube
- Release: July 12, 2025 – present

Transformers: Cyberworld (stylised as Transformers: CYBERWORLD) is an animated web series based on the Transformers toy line by Hasbro and Tomy. It is produced by Omens Studios and Hasbro Entertainment, and debuted on July 12, 2025 on YouTube (via the official Transformers channel run by Hasbro, renamed as Transformers HQ in 2026).

== Premise ==
Autobots and Decepticons alike find themselves flung into the mysterious and unknown Cyberworld. There they find themselves needing to compete in a gauntlet of extreme games and challenges, where victory is rewarded with power and enhancements, while failure drains the very energon from them. Alliances are made and broken as some seek a way to escape while others seek power, glory, and the creation of new empires. Meanwhile, the question hangs over them: how did they get here, and who or what is behind it all?

== Voice cast ==
- Kyle Kaczmarczyk as Optimus Prime and Bumblebee
- James Alexander as Megatron, Grimlock, Snarl, Galvatron, Chop Shop, Soundwave and Cheetor
- Jack Ayres as Scorponok, Sky-Byte, Mirage and Wheeljack
- Jessica Carroll as Elita-1, Airachnid and NPC Narrator
- Shogo Miyakita as Starscream and Optimus Primal
- Andres Williams as Hound
- Si Rawlinson as Jazz

== Episodes ==
Season	Episodes		Originally released
1	36		July 12, 2025 - July 11, 2026
2	42	14	August 22, 2026
2	42	28	2027

=== Season 1 (2025-26) ===
Episode	Title	Written by	Publication date
01	"Commence Program"	Ali Lightfoot	July 12, 2025
Optimus Prime lands on a mysterious new planet. As he attempts to explore, he has dangerous encounters with both Scorponok and Grimlock.
02	"Prime Target"	Ryan Denham	July 12, 2025
A very confused Bumblebee forms an unlikely team up with Megatron to face the challenge like “programs” scattered across Cyberworld.
03	"Crate Point, Well Fought"	Gretchen Mallorie	July 26, 2025
Deep in the jungle, Bumblebee and Optimus Prime face off against Grimlock and Snarl as they fight for a new weapon drop.
04	"River Race Ruckus"	Ali Lightfoot	August 2, 2025
In the Jungle region, Elita-1 races Sky-Byte in a dangerous challenge - but when Optimus Prime and Bumblebee intervene, everything spirals into an explosive battle.
05	"Smoke & Mirrors"	Gretchen Mallorie and Ali Lightfoot	August 16, 2025
Optimus Prime, Bumblebee, and Elita-1 sneak into Cyber City on a covert mission for crucial intel - but the shadows hide surprises and secrets alike.
06	"Screamer City Arena"	Ryan Denham	August 23, 2025
The team attempt to obtain the intel, but things don't go as planned - instead finding themselves forced into a last-bot-standing challenge against the Cyber City's self-proclaimed emperor.
07	"Hunter vs Hunted"	Ryan Denham	August 30, 2025
To stand a chance against Scorponok, Optimus Prime and the team set out to recruit the Dinobots. But things don't go as planned and Optimus is forced into 1 on 1 showdown with Grimlock.
08	"What Goes Up"	Gretchen Mallorie	September 6, 2025
Optimus Prime and his team enter a vertical race program - first team to reach the top for the Energon. However, they must compete against an old enemy.
09	"Storm the Desert"	Ali Lightfoot	September 17, 2025
Having lost their last program, Optimus leads the team on a desperate assault to capture the crashed ship in the Desert Region. If successful, they could finally make their way home.
10	"A Bug's Lie"	Ryan Denham	October 4, 2025
Looking to recoup the team's losses, Bumblebee embarks on secret side-mission for hidden treasure - deep in the underground tunnels of CYBERWORLD - but can he trust the sneaky bot leading him to the prize?
11	"Game-a-Tron"	Ali Lightfoot	October 11, 2025
In need of more energon, Elita-1 suggests that the team split up to earn energon faster, separately. This leads to a friendly competition to see which of them can gain the most energon the fastest.
12	"Oh Scrap!"	Ali Lightfoot	October 18, 2025
Caught in a sandstorm Optimus Prime, Elita-1 and Bumblebee are saved by a chance encounter with Junkyard Ron - a lone survivor hiding more than just scrap metal. When a strange creature begins to hunt them, the truth about Ron's past may change everything.
13	"Carousel Chaos"	Ali Lightfoot	October 25, 2025
Out of Energon and out of luck, Optimus Prime and his team jump at the chance to recharge in and easy program... but instead, they find themselves dragged into a dark and twisted Trick or Treat challenge - against some of their greatest foes!
14	"Shoot 'N' Loot"	Gretchen Mallorie	November 8, 2025
Two squads drop into an all-out team shooter showdown! Bumblebee struggles with playing support, leaving his teammates to feel the pain. Meanwhile, Mirage carries game-changing intel that could turn the tide, but convincing Optimus Prime to believe him might be the toughest mission yet.
15	"Heading to New Heist"	Ryan Denham	November 15, 2025
Optimus Prime and the team launch a high-stakes heist, with the aid of Mirage, to steal back their missing intel. But what they uncover might be even more valuable.
16	"That's Gotta Sting - Part 1"	Ryan Denham	November 22, 2025
It's NOW or never! Optimus Prime and his team face Scorponok in an epic final battle on Cyberworld. With time running out, they'll need every trick in the book to make it to the ship and escape.
17	"That's Gotta Sting - Part 2"	Ali Lightfoot	November 22, 2025
The fight in the Desert Region continues as Scorponok converts into his terrifying bot mode for a more deadly assault. Optimus Prime and his team must use all their resolve to come out on top.
18	"Escape Velocity"	Ryan Denham	December 6, 2025
In the final moments after the battle Optimus Prime and the team try to escape Cyberworld before a huge energy storm engulfs them. A race against time ensues to make it aboard the abandoned Autobot ship and secure their freedom.
19	"Torn Apart"	Ali Lightfoot	December 13, 2025
After the revelations during Optimus Prime, Bumblebee and Elita-1's attempt to escape from CYBERWORLD, the events of Elita's past altercation with Sky-Byte may hold clues to lead their next move.
20	"Over the Sea"	Tom Gidman	January 10, 2026
Seeking the truth about Wheeljack, Elita-1, Optimus Prime and Bumblebee take on a relentless co-op platformer over the open ocean - against the clock - where the slightest mistake can send them straight down to the watery depths.
21	"Beyond Repair"	Ryan Denham	January 24, 2026
Lamenting his losses and failure to expand his empire, Starscream sees an opportunity to reassert his dominance when Wheeljack enters his Cyber City. Forcing the two bots into an intense head to head repair challenge!
22	"Drone Alone"	Tom Gidman	February 7, 2026
Optimus Prime, Elita-1 & Bumblebee stage a daring rescue mission straight into enemy territory. Outnumbered by attack drones, the team must fight fast and escape before the Cyber City forces overwhelm them.
23	"Hider & Seeker"	Ali Lightfoot	February 21, 2026
No time for reunions as Optimus Prime, Elita-1, Wheeljack, Mirage & Bumblebee find themselves being hunted through the Cyber City by Starscream and his squadron of Seeker-Drones. Tensions are high and secrets unfold as the group try to get to the bottom of what's happening on CYBERWORLD.
24	"Oh Crate, This Again"	Ryan Denham	March 7, 2026
Optimus Prime and his team seek out another mysterious crate drop - but, once again, they're not alone. Forced to face off with a desperate Snarl, and with even more surprise loot hunters joining the fight, the struggle is on to claim the prize.
25	"Pride Before the Fall"	Ryan Denham	March 21, 2026
Grimlock volunteers to enter a program to recoup his lost Energon. But what starts as a simple desert race quickly spirals into a high-risk mission as Snarl is forced to keep him alive against relentless hazards and Grimlock's own stubborn drive to prove he's still at full strength.
26	"What Lies Beneath"	Tom Gidman	April 4, 2026
Optimus Prime leads the team into a hidden system beneath Cyberworld: and this isn't just a discovery mission. It's a trap. As they push deeper, every step triggers something new: laser grids, collapsing paths, and environments designed to stop anyone from reaching the truth. Wheeljack warns them to turn back, but Optimus is certain there's something important buried below. With no clear way out and danger escalating at every turn, the team is forced into a race through a gauntlet that was never meant to be beaten.
27	"Waves of Guilt"	Ali Lightfoot	April 18, 2026
Optimus Prime leads the team across a dangerous ocean program route where the path ahead is unstable, the pace keeps increasing, and one mistake could mean being swallowed whole. As the pressure builds, cracks begin to show. Optimus is distracted, the memories he's been experiencing are getting stronger, and the team must decide whether to trust their leader or question what's really happening.
28	"Everybody Dance, Ow!"	Ryan Denham	May 2, 2026
The team is forced into a rhythm-based challenge, and there's no way out but to keep moving. What starts as a strange program quickly turns into a test of timing, coordination, and teamwork as Optimus Prime, Elita-1, Bumblebee, and Wheeljack try to survive a deceptively difficult dance gauntlet.
29	"One Last Byte"	Tom Gidman	May 16, 2026
After tensions split the team apart, Optimus Prime races to find Bumblebee before things spiral any further. But while they're gone, Wheeljack and Elita-1 are forced into a dangerous showdown across the Ocean Region with their old enemy Sky-Byte.
30	"Twisted Webs"	Ali Lightfoot	May 30, 2026
Snatched by an unknown assailant Elita-1 and Wheeljack have been captured! Thankfully Optimus Prime and Bumblebee arrive just in time to rescue the pair - but as a fight breaks out with their vengeance-fueled captor, things might not be as simple as they first appear.
31	"Alley-O.P."	Ryan Denham	June 6, 2026
Taking the new line-up out for some morale boosting Energon gains, Optimus Prime and his team face-off against some familiar faces in a heated "basketrek" program. Meanwhile Wheeljack makes some unnerving discoveries about happenings on CYBERWORLD.
32	"Woeful Recall"	Ali Lightfoot	June 12, 2026
As the team goes over recent discoveries while Airachnid probes Optimus's mind for answers, a startling revelation ends up being far more sinister than they could've ever imagined.
33	"Help Wanted"	Tom Gidman	June 19, 2026
Bumblebee's fractured ability to trust others ends up causing friction with the others as Cyberworld starts losing energon, and on his mission to follow a trail, Optimus discovers a dastardly find.
34	"For the Win I: Dragon's Lair"	Tom Gidman	June 26, 2026
With Galvatron's scheme now out in the open, Optimus and everyone in the vicinity all begin a last-ditch effort to stop the crazed Decepticon from utterly destroying Cyberworld.
35	"For the Win II: Threat from Above"	Ali Lightfoot	July 4, 2026
Galvatron isn't slowing down. Optimus Prime and his ragtag team are in a race to save everyone, but to stop him, they'll need a new plan executed to perfection before it's too late.
36	"For the Win III: For Cyberworld"	Ryan Denham	July 11, 2026
All of Cyberworld hangs in the balance as Galvatron makes his final stand, but Bumblebee's newfound hatred of Optimus Prime brings the yellow autobot all the way to a fever pitch.

=== Season 2 (2026) ===
Episode	Title	Written by	Publication date
01	"Next Level"	Ryan Denham	August 22, 2026
Elita-1 & Wheeljack express concern about Bumblebee's increasingly erratic behaviour in a program, whilst elsewhere Optimus Prime laments the division of his former team.
02	"Magnetic Revulsion"	Ali Lightfoot	August 22, 2026
Face-to-face for the first time since the events of last season, Elita-1's team compete against Optimus Prime and the Dinobots in an intense magnetic program. But Bumblebee struggles to contain his fury with his old friend.
03	"Waves in the Water"	Tom Gidman	September 5, 2026
Feral, super-powered and almost unrecognisable, sea monster Soundwave has been transformed by a mysterious energy, and Elita-1 is caught in his clutches. Meanwhile, Bumblebee continues his mission alone... but not for long.
04	"Plan Bee"	Tom Gidman	September 19, 2026
Embracing his darker side, Bumblebee leads a team of Chop Shop & Mirage underground through a gruelling gauntlet of traps - in search of more power. The further they descend, the more danger they encounter - but not necessarily from the traps.
05	"Sound Off"	Ali Lightfoot	October 3, 2026
Elita-1 catches up with old ally Jazz as he reveals the story of his past with Soundwave. Doing so, she discovers a worrying connection to what's happening with Bumblebee. Meanwhile Optimus Prime and the others continue their search for her.
06	"Clash of the Mighty 'Uns"	Tom Gidman	October 10, 2026
Optimus Prime’s team continues their search to reunite with Elita-1. But when they are ambushed by the monstrous Soundwave, Grimlock stays behind, forcing the corrupted sea monster to a 1v1 program so the others can escape.
07	"Robots in the Ice"	Ryan Denham	October 24, 2026
Jazz returns to the Snow Region to report to his allies there about what he learned from his run-in with Elita-1, but his harsh drill sergeant leader Hound has no plans to make it easy, insistent on carrying out a gruelling training regime.
08	"Star to Fall"	Tom Gidman	November 7, 2026
Bumblebee (now calling himself Power Spark) leads his ragtag crew to the Cyber City, confronting Starscream in a battle for supremacy of the Region.
09	"That's Just Prime"	Ali Lightfoot	November 21, 2026
Optimus Prime, Elita-1 & Wheeljack continue their race to save Bumblebee from his growing corruption, but a run-in with a mysterious new arrival on CYBERWORLD could change everything!
