= Hasbro Entertainment =

American production and distribution company

- Logo used since 2023
- Type: Division
- Industry: Entertainment
- Predecessors: Claster Television; Hasbro Entertainment (first incarnation); Allspark; eOne Family & Brands; Saban Brands
- Founded: August 16, 2023; 3 years ago
- Founders: Oliver Dumont; Zev Foreman; Gabriel Marano
- Headquarters: 3333 West Empire Ave., Burbank, California, United States
- Products: Film production; Television series; Animated series
- Parent: Hasbro
- Subsidiaries: Lumee

Hasbro Entertainment is an American production and distribution company owned and operated by Hasbro. It succeeds Allspark (previously known as Hasbro Studios) as Hasbro's primary media production and distribution company, and is also a successor to the family brands division of Canadian company Entertainment One, which Hasbro acquired along with the rest of the company on December 30, 2019, before selling all non-family assets to Lionsgate on December 27, 2023.

== History ==
=== Background ===
Under the leadership of Brian Goldner as the chairman and chief executive officer (CEO), American toy company Hasbro was expanding into the audiovisual media industry, especially theatrical feature film productions. On August 22, 2019, Hasbro announced its purchase of the Canadian company Entertainment One (eOne) for about US$4 billion; Goldner led the acquisition. The deal was completed on December 30, 2019. Following the acquisition of eOne, Hasbro's own media production and distribution company Allspark (formerly known as Hasbro Studios) was folded into the acquired Canadian subsidiary, which was under the leadership of Darren Throop, president of family brands Olivier Dumont, and former HBO head of programming Michael Lombardo.

However, following the death of Goldner on October 12, 2021, the subsequent promotion of Chris Cocks (who was previously with another Hasbro division, Wizards of the Coast) as the CEO in early-2022, and after defeating a board challenge from a hedge fund company in June 2022 over the management of WotC, Hasbro announced in late-2022 their intent to sell most eOne assets with companies such as Fremantle (who dropped out of the bid), Lionsgate, Legendary, CVC Capital Partners and GoDigital Media Group bidding for the acquisition, a transaction that would place the distribution rights to the Hasbro Studios/Allspark library and newer Hasbro-related content back to Hasbro. It was ultimately decided that on August 3, 2023, Lionsgate would acquire the eOne assets for $500 million. The deal closed on December 27, 2023.

=== Development ===
During its 2023 Q2 Earnings Conference Call in August 2023, Hasbro announced a new banner titled Hasbro Entertainment. The studio is being overseen by former Entertainment One executives Olivier Dumont as president, Zev Foreman as head of film, and Gabriel Marano as head of television. Dumont was quoted as saying, "We are thrilled to embark on this new chapter, building upon our rich heritage of storytelling to continue delighting audiences across generations. Gabe, Zev, and I look forward to working with the industry's best creative talent, studios, and distribution platforms to push the envelope with innovative storytelling that will let fans engage with their favorite brands like never before, while also building exciting new worlds and the next wave of Hasbro franchises for a growing audience."

Additionally, Tim Kilpin, President of Toy Licensing and Entertainment for Hasbro, was quoted as saying, "Entertainment is core to Hasbro's strategy and its mission to entertain and connect generations of fans through the wonder of storytelling and exhilaration of play. Audiences can count on Hasbro to keep creating compelling and fun entertainment that brings to life our wide array of iconic brands, including Peppa Pig, PJ Masks, My Little Pony, and Transformers, reaching audiences through varied platforms in ways that resonate in today's fast-paced world."

On October 3, 2024, in the same day of the premieres of its revival versions of the Scrabble and Trivial Pursuit game shows on The CW, Hasbro Entertainment launched an unscripted division, which is headed by Zach Edwin, who reports to head of television Gabriel Marano.

On November 22, 2024, following the underperformance of Transformers One, Hasbro announced that they would be no longer be co-financing films based on its properties, in order to focus on video games and digital entertainment, leaving external studios to exclusively fund such projects. However, Hasbro Entertainment would continue to co-produce the film adaptations of their brands.

== Staff ==
- Zev Foreman (head of film)
- Gabriel Marano (head of television)
  - Cort Lane (kids' television VP)
  - Zach Edwin (head of unscripted)
  - Rob Doherty (VP of production)
  - Tom Hartley (VP of animation and digital content)

== Subsidiaries ==
- Lumee (joint venture with Animaj SAS)

== Television ==
=== Current ===
Title	Original run	Network	Co-production with	Note(s)
Inherited from Entertainment One, now Lionsgate Canada
Peppa Pig	2004–present	Channel 5 Nick Jr.	Astley Baker Davies Ltd (Series 1–8) (Note: Did not animate the last four episodes of Series 7, but did animate the first four episodes of Series 8); Karrot Animation (Series 8–present) (Note: Animated the last four episodes of Series 7, but did not animate the first four episodes of Series 8)	Series 8 onward
PJ Masks	2015–2024	CBC Television; Disney Jr. France 5	Frog Box; TeamTO; The Walt Disney Company EMEA	
My Little Pony: Tell Your Tale	2022–2024	YouTube	Lil Critter Workshop	Season 2 onward
My Little Pony: Make Your Mark	2022–2023	Netflix	Entertainment One	Season 2 onward
Transformers: EarthSpark	2022–2025	Paramount+ Nickelodeon	Nickelodeon Animation Studio	Season 2 onward
Hasbro Entertainment productions
Odd-Paw Vet	2023–2025	YouTube	Amuse Studios	
Scrabble	2024–present	The CW	Mattel Studios; Lionsgate Alternative Television	
Trivial Pursuit	2024–present	The CW	LeVar Burton Entertainment; Talpa Studios; Lionsgate Alternative Television	
Transformers: Cyberworld	2025–present	YouTube	Omens Studios	

=== Upcoming ===
Title	Network	Co-production with	Note(s)
Ravenloft	Netflix	Esperanto Filmoj	
Planeswalker	Netflix	Wizards of the Coast	
Monopoly	Netflix	Studio Lambert	
Clue	Netflix	Sony Pictures Television; The Intellectual Property Corporation; B17 Entertainment	
Untitled Magic: The Gathering live-action series	TBA	Legendary Television; Warner Bros. Television	
Untitled Energon Universe series	TBA	Skybound Entertainment	
Untitled Baldur's Gate 3 live-action series	HBO	TBA	
Untitled Jem and the Holograms live-action series	Prime Video	Amazon MGM Studios; Kilter Films	
My Little Pony: Forever Friendship	YouTube	Lil Critter Workshop	

== Films ==
=== Released films ===
Title	Release date	Production by	Distributed by	Note(s)
Transformers One	September 20, 2024	Paramount Animation; Di Bonaventura Pictures; New Republic Pictures; Bayhem Films	Paramount Pictures	

=== Upcoming films ===
Title	Co-produced by	Distributed by	Note
Untitled G.I. Joe film	Di Bonaventura Pictures; Rough House Pictures	Paramount Pictures	
Monopoly	LuckyChap Entertainment eOne Films	Lionsgate	
Clue	TriStar Pictures; Blink Wink Productions; Maximum Effort; Aggregate Films	Sony Pictures Releasing	
Untitled Magic: The Gathering film	Legendary Entertainment	TBA	
Untitled My Little Pony live-action film		Amazon MGM Studios	
Untitled G.I. Joe film	Di Bonaventura Pictures	Paramount Pictures	
Untitled The Game of Life film	Chernin Entertainment	Amazon MGM Studios	
Untitled Transformers film	Di Bonaventura Pictures, Bayhem Films	Paramount Pictures	

== See also ==
- List of films based on Hasbro properties
- List of television programs based on Hasbro properties
