= David Sheinkopf =

American actor (born 1970)

- Born: August 15, 1970 (age 55)
- Occupation(s): Television actor, author
- Years active: 1988–present

David Sheinkopf (born August 15, 1970) is an American actor and author, best known for playing Danny Sharpe during the final (1989–1990) season of the television program Falcon Crest.

== Career ==
Sheinkopf appeared in episodes of Quantum Leap, Party of Five, JAG and Diagnosis: Murder. As of 2006, he appears on HGTV's Design on a Dime. He also portrayed Morris Delancy in the Disney movie, Newsies.

In 2022, he wrote a book titled Village Idiot: A Manhattan Memoir that chronicles his time growing up in New York's Greenwich Village in the 1980s.

== Filmography ==
=== Film ===
Year	Title	Role	Notes
1992	Newsies	Morris Delancey	
1998	Anarchy TV	Reporter	
2001	Forbidden City	Billy	
2013	Cloudy with a Chance of Meatballs 2	Additional voices	
2013	Planes	ADR voice	
2014	Planes: Fire & Rescue	ADR voice	
2014	The Pirate Fairy	ADR voice	
2014	Lack of Cockery	Tristan Thomas	
2016	Ben-Hur	Voice	
2020	Dolittle	Don Carpenterino	

=== Television ===
Year	Title	Role	Notes
1988	As the World Turns	Arnie Gephart	Episode #1.8496
1989–1990	Falcon Crest	Danny Sharpe	12 episodes
1990	Ferris Bueller	Tony	Episode: "Between a Rock and Rooney's Place"
1990	Quantum Leap	Mike	Episode: "One Strobe Over the Line"
1991	For the Very First Time	Goldstein	Television film
1993	CBS Schoolbreak Special	Russ Barker	Episode: "Crosses on the Lawn"
1994	Party of Five	Jason	Episode: "Good Sports"
1995	Ned and Stacey	Bob	Episode: "Accountus Interruptus"
1997	Pacific Blue	Willy Either	Episode: "The Last Ride"
1997	JAG	Lt. Cmdr. 'Monk' Decker	Episode: "Vanished"
1998	Blade Squad	Grinnell	Television film
1998	Diagnosis: Murder	Philip Evans Cobler	Episode: "Till Death Do Us Part"
2017	Transformers: Robots in Disguise	Dropforge	2 episodes
2021–2022	I Met My Murderer Online	Narrator	26 episodes

=== Video games ===
Year	Title	Role
2006	Saints Row	Radio Voice
2009	Command & Conquer: Red Alert 3 – Uprising	Voice
2016	Deus Ex: Mankind Divided	Additional voices
2016	Titanfall 2	Legion Titan

== Publication ==
- Sheinkopf, David (2022). Village Idiot: A Manhattan Memoir. New York: Full Court Press. ISBN 9781946989963.
