= Transformers: Robots in Disguise (2015 TV series) =

American animated TV series

- Genre: Action; Adventure; Science fiction
- Based on: Transformers by Hasbro and Takara Tomy
- Developed by: Adam Beechen; Duane Capizzi; Jeff Kline
- Voices of: Stuart Allan; Darren Criss; Will Friedle; Ted McGinley; Khary Payton; Mitchell Whitfield; Constance Zimmer
- Theme music composer: Kevin Kiner; Anne Bryant; Clifford Kinder
- Composers: Kevin Manthei (season 1); Kevin Kiner
- Countries of origin: United States; Japan
- Original language: English
- No. of seasons: 3
- No. of episodes: 71 (list of episodes)

Production
- Executive producers: Jeff Kline (seasons 1–2); Stephen Davis
- Producer: Adam Beechen
- Production companies: Hasbro Studios; Polygon Pictures; Darby Pop Productions (seasons 1–2)

Original release
- Network: Cartoon Network
- Release: March 14, 2015 – November 11, 2017

Related
- Transformers: Prime; Transformers: Rescue Bots; Transformers: Rescue Bots Academy

Transformers: Robots in Disguise is a science-fiction animated television series for children produced by Hasbro Studios and Darby Pop Productions in the United States for Cartoon Network and animated by Polygon Pictures in Japan. It is the stand-alone sequel to Transformers: Prime that ran from 2010 to 2013 on The Hub Network, featuring characters (most of whose voice actors reprise their roles) and storylines mostly self-contained from the events of its predecessor as well as an overall more lighthearted tone. Roberto Orci and Alex Kurtzman (the executive producers of Prime) did not return to the new series. In the United States, the series ran on Cartoon Network from March 14, 2015, to November 11, 2017.

The show's second season, featuring guest appearances from some returning Transformers: Prime characters, premiered on February 20, 2016. A six-episode mini-series centered on the return of Starscream premiered in Canada on September 10, 2016, before debuting on U.S. television the following month. The third and final season, subtitled Combiner Force, aired from April 29, 2017, to November 11, 2017.

It was the first Transformers series to feature Bumblebee as the main protagonist rather than Optimus Prime, the leader of the Autobots and the main protagonist in most of the other series (though Optimus appears in a semi-regular role throughout Robots in Disguise).

== Plot ==
=== Season 1 ===
Three years after Megatron's exile, the Predacons' defeat, and life being restored to the planet Cybertron, a new generation of Transformers enjoy a new age of prosperity. Earth no longer remembers the Decepticon-Autobot conflict as the Cybertronians stopped visiting the planet. Bumblebee has since become a seasoned Cybertronian police officer and despite his fame, he chooses to be a humble peacekeeper. Things change when he is summoned by the vision of Optimus Prime. Thought to be long dead after restoring Cybertron's population, Optimus Prime calls for Bumblebee to return to Earth as a new threat appears.

With the help of Sideswipe (a rebel punk "bad boy bot") and Strongarm (an Elite Guard cadet partnered with him), the trio makes it to Earth to discover a crashed maximum security prison ship called the Alchemor and its steward Fixit (a hyperactive Mini-Con with faulty wiring). They soon learn the Alchemor had "a couple hundred" Decepticon prisoners within Stasis Pods, but all of its inmates have escaped. They now must recapture all the escaped Decepticon prisoners before they cause further harm on Earth. With the aid of humans Russell and Denny Clay and the Dinobot Grimlock (who was a prisoner of Alchemor for committing property damage before siding with Bumblebee), Bumblebee leads this unlikely team to protect Earth from the Decepticon prisoners and restore order. During their mission they often clash with Steeljaw who soon forms his own group of fellow Decepticon prisoners (consisting of the metal-eating Underbite, crime boss Thunderhoof, stranded bounty hunter Fracture and his Mini-Con partners Airazor and Divebomb, and cowardly informant Clampdown) to contend with the Autobots and attempt to conquer Earth.

The Autobots are later joined by the likes of former Decepticon turned Autobot bounty hunter and samurai Drift, his Mini-Con partners and students Slipstream and Jetstorm, the female warrior Windblade, and Optimus Prime, who returns from the dead in the wake of the arrival of the Fallen and traitorous prime Megatronus, who was the one that crashed the Alchemor to free the prisoners (and subsequently blackmailed Steeljaw into helping him escape his imprisonment) and who the Thirteen Primes have been preparing Optimus for. During the battle against Megatronus, Bumblebee, Sideswipe, and Strongarm realize they can combine their Decepticon hunters and become more powerful. With this new knowledge, the Autobots prevail, seemingly destroying Megatronus with a powerful energy beam, and apprehending Underbite, Thunderhoof, Fracture, and Clampdown, though Steeljaw escapes. Bumblebee then finally overcomes his insecurities of being a worthy leader, finding his perfect rallying cry ("Rev up and Roll out!"), and chooses to remain on Earth to protect it from any other potential future threats, as do the rest of his team, including Optimus, who states that from now on he will be Bumblebee's equal rather than leader, to which Bumblebee agrees.

=== Season 2 ===
Weeks after Megatronus' defeat, the Autobots continue to deal with the threat of the Decepticon fugitives that are still on Earth. While Steeljaw is still at large, he eventually discovers another group of Decepticons stationed on the crashed remains of the second half of the Alchemor that is dubbed "Decepticon Island" and led by Glowstrike, Scorponok, and Saberhorn. As Optimus is weakened when the immense power he was lent from the Primes is drained by them, the Autobots split into two teams: an Away Team led by Optimus and consisting of Drift, Slipstream, Jetstorm, Sideswipe, and Windblade, and another team led by Bumblebee that remains at their scrapyard base. Along the way, the Autobots run into a strange occurrence in the form of Decepticon criminals who are not listed in the Alchemor prisoner manifest yet have criminal records on Cybertron. At the same time, Steeljaw attempts to prove himself to the Decepticon Island by not only freeing Thunderhoof and Clampdown, but also new prisoners, including criminal Bisk, wrestler Groundpounder, saboteur Overload, anarchist Quillfire, and mythical city hunter Springload, to be his "elite warriors."

During this time, Optimus slowly recovers his strength and teaches his team valuable lessons about teamwork. Fixit eventually repairs the Autobots' Ground Bridge, which was destroyed by an explosion that occurred after he originally dispatched the Away Team; however, a malfunction allows the Decepticon Soundwave (who was trapped in the Shadowzone - a parallel dimension where anyone and anything becomes completely invisible and can't interact with normal space, as if they were out of phase - in the season 3 finale of Transformers: Prime) to escape. Soundwave then attempts to contact the former Decepticon leader Megatron (who went into a self-induced exile following the events of Predacons Rising) and have him return to Earth, but is thwarted by Team Bee and returned to the Shadowzone.

As the two Autobot teams are reunited, they pair up with the Autobot medical officer and Optimus and Bumblebee's old friend and teammate Ratchet, along with his Mini-Con Undertone, to apprehend the rest of the Decepticons on Decepticon Island. Using a Stasis Bomb, they manage to place Decepticons in stasis, while Bumblebee and Optimus, aided by Fixit and his fellow Caretaker Mini-Cons who were enslaved, defeat Steeljaw. Following their victory, Optimus Prime, Ratchet, Windblade, and the Caretaker Mini-Cons repair the ship and return all Decepticon prisoners to Cybertron, as Bumblebee and his team reside on Earth.

=== Miniseries ===
Shortly after the Autobots' victory on Decepticon Island, a group of Decepticon Scavengers arrive on Earth looking for relics from the Great War; they have been partnered with Weaponizer Mini-Cons, a type of Mini-Con who can control the bodies of their wielder and grant team great powers. At the same time, Starscream (who was presumed dead after the events of Predacons Rising) makes an unexpected return, revealing that he killed the Predacons (minus Predaking) using weapons hoarded by Megatron; he is aided by a trio of bounty hunters - Shadelock, RoughEdge, and Razorhorn - in his quest for the powerful Dark Star Saber and the Weaponizer Mini-Cons, intending to use them to rebuild the Decepticon Empire and exact revenge on Megatron for all of the abuse he inflicted upon him. Upon learning the truth from the Mini-Con Sawtooth, the Weaponizers abandon the Scavengers and later ally themselves with the Autobots, aiding them in their battle against Starscream. Ultimately, all the Decepticons, including Starscream, are defeated and placed onto Optimus's ship alongside the Dark Star Saber, who leaves to deliver them to the Cybertronian Authorities. The Weaponizers thank the Autobots for saving them and then they leave in their Sub-Orbital Craft (which Fixit both fixed and modified for space travel) with the intent of "going where they will never be found".

=== Season 3 ===
Sometime after their victory against Starscream and the Scavengers, Team Bee crosses paths with the Stunticons, a group of Decepticons consisting of Motormaster, Dragstrip, Slashmark, Heatseeker, and Wildbreak, who can combine to form the massive Menasor. To combat this new threat, the Autobots need to learn how to combine themselves, becoming Ultra Bee.

Following the Stunticons' defeat, Optimus Prime has them and several other Decepticons that have been captured recently stored away in his ship so he can return them to Cybertron. He also enlists Drift and his Mini-Con students to accompany him on a special mission. Meanwhile, Soundwave attempts to escape from the Shadowzone once again, aided by a group of Activator Mini-Cons, and Steeljaw, Underbite, Thunderhoof, Quillfire, and Clampdown also return to cause more problems for the Autobots, attempting to capture Team Bee for their mysterious benefactors on Cybertron who arranged for them to be pardoned of their respective crimes. Soundwave eventually escapes from the Shadowzone and is revealed to also be allied with Steeljaw's mysterious benefactors, but is defeated by Team Bee before he can activate a beacon to summon Megatron, and subsequently taken back to Cybertron by Optimus Prime to stand trial. Soundwave and Steeljaw's mysterious benefactors are later revealed to be the Autobot High Council, who are Decepticon infiltrators, usurpers, controllers, and manipulators Cyclonus, Cyberwarp, Riotgear, Skyjack, and Treadshock who have plans to invade Earth. After a battle for the fate of both Earth and Cybertron, the High Council, in their combined form of Galvatronus, are ultimately defeated by Ultra Bee, and the Autobots restore order to Cybertron.

As a new Autobot High Council is formed, Team Bee returns to live on Earth as ambassadors and continues protecting it from any possible future threats while working to find Steeljaw, who is still at large.

== Characters ==
=== Autobots ===
- Bumblebee (voiced by Will Friedle) - The main protagonist of the series who transforms into a yellow and black Griffin Motors 1995 Windblazer, which is similar to the Chevrolet Camaro, and also forms the head and torso of Ultra Bee. At the start of the series, Bumblebee is working on the Cybertron police force due to the Autobot High Council having issues with the Autobots. While helping Strongarm to apprehend Sideswipe, Bumblebee gets a vision of Optimus Prime that draws him back to Earth. As the leader of the Autobot team on Earth, he is constantly worried about living up to Optimus' legacy, shown when leading his team, especially when he is trying to keep order in the group. Bumblebee wields a Decepticon Hunter, a device that takes the form of any weapon a bot can think of; he primarily uses the Hunter in the form of a battle staff.
- Optimus Prime (voiced by Peter Cullen) - The last of the Primes, the leader of the Autobots, and Bumblebee's mentor who transforms into a red and blue semi-truck with an accompanying trailer. Originally thought to have died after the events of Transformers Prime Beast Hunters: Predacons Rising, he was resurrected by the Primes of the past to help stop their rogue brother Megatronus, whose evil would result in the destruction of both Earth and Cybertron. Following his return to Earth, he co-leads the Autobots alongside Bumblebee as his equal. In season two, he becomes leader of the Away Team, leading Sideswipe, Windblade, Drift, Slipstream, and Jetstorm.
- Strongarm (voiced by Constance Zimmer) - A cadet in the Cybertronian Elite Guard and Bumblebee's subordinate who transforms into a blue and white police-modified pickup truck and also forms the right arm of Ultra Bee. She often worries about abiding by the law and following protocol, which in certain cases jeopardizes the mission. She is essentially the complete opposite of Sideswipe and the two often argue with each other. Strongarm's Decepticon Hunter takes the form of a crossbow.
- Sideswipe (voiced by Darren Criss) - The rebellious "bad boy" of the Bee Team who transforms into a red street racing-ready sports car and also forms the left arm of Ultra Bee. He has authority issues due to the regulations the "High Council" has enforced. Despite being reckless and seemingly uncaring, Sideswipe will dive into a fight to protect his friends, using his speed and agility to battle the Decepticons, sharing a strong friendship with Grimlock and Russell. Sideswipe's Decepticon Hunter takes the form of a sword.
- Fixit (voiced by Mitchell Whitfield) - A hyperactive yet faulty-wired Mini-Con who originally served as the steward and guard of the Alchemor and later serves as the Autobots' caretaker and medic. He also provides the identification of the escaped Decepticons and reports their location. He develops a close friendship with Russell and Denny as he is rarely out in the field. Because Fixit is so small, he does not have a proper vehicle mode and instead turns into a variety of tools and weapons. However, he transforms into a drill-type vehicle in the toyline.
- Grimlock (voiced by Khary Payton) - A Dinobot serving as the team's muscle who transforms into a mechanical Tyrannosaurus and also forms the legs of Ultra Bee. Originally recruited as a Decepticon for committing property damage, he ended up imprisoned on the Alchemor, he later becomes an Autobot after gaining the team's trust, and eventually gains Autobot symbols in place of his Decepticon logos. He is not very bright and often attempts to solve problems with his fists rather than strategy, but he has shown that he can learn from his mistakes and can be relied upon whenever the team needs him.
- Drift (voiced by Eric Bauza) - Formerly a Decepticon known as Deadlock, Drift is an Autobot bounty hunter who transforms into an orange samurai-like car resembling a cross between a Bugatti Veyron and a Gumpert Apollo and also forms the sword of Ultra Bee. Drift has a samurai motif and is very honorable, which includes fighting fairly (much to his occasional disadvantage). Although it is not seen very often early on, Drift has shown that he is capable of being both a strict yet fair sensei and a caring father figure. He wields two Cybertronian ninjatos in battle.
  - Slipstream and Jetstorm (both voiced by Roger Craig Smith) - Drift's Mini-Con students who can both transform into buzzsaws that can attach themselves onto Drift's wrists. Both of them were originally ex-criminals and students of Shadow Raker before being taken in by Drift. Splitstream wields a battle staff while Jetstorm wields nunchucks.
- Jazz (voiced by Arif S. Kinchen) - A friend of Bumblebee and Sideswipe's idol who transforms into a race car. By the end of the series, Jazz remains on Cybertron as a temporary member of the High Council.
- Windblade (voiced by Kristy Wu in Season 1–2, Erica Lindbeck in Season 3) - A charming yet somewhat arrogant female Autobot with a kabuki women motif who transforms into a red and black VTOL jet. Prior to meeting the Bee Team, Windblade spent her time capturing Decepticons solo as well as gathering supplies and storing them at her various caches.

==== Returning Autobots ====
- Ratchet (voiced by Jeffrey Combs) - A veteran Autobot medic and a long-time friend of Optimus Prime who transforms into a white and red ambulance resembling a Ford E-350. He was sent by the new Autobot High Council to hunt down the war criminals, resulting in him encountering Bumblebee's group.
  - Undertone - A silent Mini-Con partnered with Ratchet who transforms into a buzzsaw vehicle.
- Bulkhead (voiced by Kevin Michael Richardson) - An Autobot Wrecker and one of Bumblebee's old teammates who transforms into a green SUV resembling a Lamborghini LM002. After Wingcode's defeat, Bulkhead sticks around on Earth to await for Optimus Prime and joins Grimlock in punching rocks in a quarry. At the end of the series, Bulkhead becomes a temporary member of the Autobot High Council.

==== Other Autobots ====
- Toolbox (voiced by Mitchell Whitfield) - One of the older model Mini-Cons who were assigned to guard the Alchemor alongside Fixit. When the Alchemor crashes on Earth, Toolbox and the Mini-Cons with him are enslaved by Glowstrike and Scorponok so that they can repair the Alchemor in their plans to plunder the galaxy. Toolbox and the Mini-Cons escape from Glowstrike and Scorponok in the episode "Decepticon Island" and leave Earth for Cybertron.
  - Cinch (voiced by Mitchell Whitfield) - A Mini-Con worker on the Alchemor who was enslaved by Glowstrike's group. Following the episode "Decepticon Island", he and the rest of his co-workers leave Earth for Cybertron in the repaired Alchemor.
- Blurr (voiced by Max Mittelman) - A Velocitronian Autobot recruit originally on the Rescue Bots team who transforms into a blue and white Ferrari FXX Evoluzione racing car. He serves as Sideswipe's intern from "Blurred" until "Bee Cool".
- Nightra (voiced by Lori Petty) - A former Autobot cadet at the Kaon Police Academy who was a fellow student of Strongarm until she was expelled by the academy's proctors for swiping a keyfile. Afterwards, she became a bounty hunter.
- Blastwave (voiced by Roger Craig Smith) - An Autobot bounty hunter who, like Bumblebee once was, is unable to speak. He utilizes sign language to communicate.
- Dropforge (voiced by David Sheinkopf) - An Autobot Mini-Con detective and Strongarm and Nightra's former mentor at the Kaon Police Academy who is portrayed as a stereotypical hard-boiled detective.

=== Decepticons ===
Most of the Decepticons in this series were originally prisoners on a maximum security prison ship called the Alchemor. Most of them have animal motifs in their robot modes or have animalistic forms as their alternate mode. At the beginning of the series, the Alchemor crashlands on Earth because of Megatronus and the Decepticon prisoners are freed. It is now the mission of Bumblebee's team to re-capture them.

- Steeljaw (voiced by Troy Baker) - A wolf-motif Decepticon who transforms into a wolf snout-like off-road vehicle. He is the recurring antagonist of the series and is Bumblebee's new nemesis in a vein which echos the rivalry with Optimus Prime and Megatron. As revealed in "Lockout", Steeljaw was imprisoned on the Alchemor for trying to incite a rebellion. He wishes to rule Earth as a safe and peaceful haven for Decepticons.
- Glowstrike (voiced by Grey Griffin) - A female Insecticon who transforms into a robotic firefly and serves as an antagonist in the second season. She possesses the ability to fire energy blasts from her hands and skirt-like feature and is frustrated by the apparent incompetence of her various underlings.
  - Scorponok (voiced by Victor Brandt) - A Decepticon gladiator who can transform into a robotic scorpion and is capable of using his bladed tail in robot or animal mode. Scorponok was imprisoned on the Alchemor for terrorizing outlying communities on Cybertron that are largely outside the reach of the law by tearing them down and intimidating the inhabitants for simple enjoyment.
  - Saberhorn (voiced by Fred Tatasciore) - An Insecticon pirate who transforms into a robotic rhinoceros beetle. He wields dual sabers and relishes "sporting" combat against worthy adversaries. He was imprisoned on the Alchemor for plundering cargo vessels.
- Starscream (voiced by Steve Blum) - The Air Commander of the Decepticon Seekers and Megatron's former second-in-command who transforms into a fighter jet.
- Soundwave (voiced by Frank Welker) - A Decepticon spy and communications officer who transforms into a blue UAV drone aircraft resembling an MQ-9 Reaper and later a futuristic truck based on his Generation One counterpart, although he retains his head design in both bodies. He was trapped in an alternate dimension known as the Shadowzone by the end of Transformers: Prime until he returned in "Portals" when Fixit had an accident with the Groundbridge. Bumblebee's group were able to send him back into the Shadowzone before he could contact Megatron. Soundwave returns in the "Combiner Force" season as a major antagonist. In "Collateral Damage", Soundwave is defeated by Bumblebee and taken to Cybertron to stand trial.
  - Laserbeak - A bird-like Decepticon-allied Mini-Con surveillance drone under the command of Soundwave who can detach from his chest.

==== Scavengers ====
The Scavengers are a group of Decepticon relic hunters who arrived on Earth to look for relics from the Great War and struck up a partnership with some Weaponizer Mini-Cons, who are not pleased with their violent ways. They were eventually abandoned by the Weaponizers, who defected to the Autobots.

- Clawtrap (voiced by André Sogliuzzo) - The leader of the Scavengers. He is a recycled, recolred, and altered version of Clampdown.
- Paralon (voiced by Jason Spisak) - A Decepticon Scavenger who is known for looking to find his next big score before somebody else can beat him to it and steal the glory that is rightfully his. To this end, he will do just about anything to gain a reputation, even brutalize his own kind to get what he wants. He is a recycled, recolored, and altered version of Scorponok.
- Scatterspike (voiced by Robin Weigert) - A rowdy female Decepticon Scavenger who possesses quills that make anything that are struck by them magnetic. He is a recycled and recolored version of Quillfire.
- Thermidor (voiced by Jim Cummings) - A pirate-mannered Decepticon Scavenger who was the original owner of the Scavengers' ship before it was commandeered by Clawtrap. He is a recycled, recolored, and altered version of Bisk

==== Stunticons ====
The Stunticons are a team of stunt vehicle Decepticons who are the main antagonists of the "Combiner Force" season until Cyclonus took place as the main antagonist for the rest of the "Combiner Force" season. The Stunticons can combine to form Menasor (voiced by Travis Willingham), a destructive yet unstable and unbalanced combiner.

- Motormaster (voiced by Travis Willingham) - The leader of the Stunticons who transforms into a silver and purple futuristic tanker truck and forms the torso of Menasor. He arrived on Earth in order to claim its roads for himself and his minions.
- Heatseeker (voiced by Mikey Kelley) - A Stunticon whose wild and crazed personality is based on Wildrider, the resident insane Stunticon in most Transformers series. He can shoot guided missiles, and transforms into an SUV whose color scheme is based on Offroad, Wildrider's present-day replacement from the "Combiner Wars" toy line. Heatseeker also forms the top half of Heatmark and the left leg of Menasor.
- Dragstrip (voiced by Maurice LaMarche) - The self-proclaimed second-in-command of the Stunticons who can use nitro boosts, and transforms into a yellow and purple futuristic sports car. He also forms both the top half of Dragbreak and the right arm of Menasor.
- Wildbreak (voiced by Dave Wittenberg) - A nervous and cowardly Stunticon who is based on Breakdown, the cowardly Stunticon in most Transformers series, mainly the Transformers: Generation One and Transformers: Animated continuities. He can create friction waves and forms the bottom half of Dragbreak and the left arm of Menasor.
- Slashmark (voiced by David Kaye) - A Stunticon based on Dead End, the gloomy Stunticon in most Transformers series. He can summon energy rings and forms the bottom half of Heatmark and the right leg of Menasor.

==== Galvatronus ====
Galvatronus (voiced by Harry Lennix) - Galvatronus is the combined form of Cyclonus, Cyberwarp, Skyjack, Treadshock, and Riotgear, five Decepticons who infiltrated the High Council.

- Cyclonus (voiced by Harry Lennix) - The leader of the High Council. He can transform into a Cybertronian starfighter and forms the torso of Galvatronus.
- Cyberwarp (voiced by Brooke Goldner) - A female member of the High Council. She can transform into a Cybertronian VTOL-pod and forms the right arm of Galvatronus. After Galvatronus is defeated, Cyberwarp expresses hope that both sides can work together instead of fighting.
- Skyjack - A female member of the High Council. She can transform into a Cybertronian VTOL-pod and forms the left arm of Galvatronus.
- Treadshock - A member of the High Council. He can transform into a Cybertronian off-road vehicle and forms the right leg of Galvatronus.
- Riotgear - A member of the High Council. He can transform into a Cybertronian off-road vehicle and forms the left leg of Galvatronus.

==== Other Decepticons ====
- Underbite (voiced by Liam O'Brien) - A Texan-accented Decepticon Chompazoid (a Gorgonopsia-motif Cybertronian) who transforms into a Cybertronian tank-like vehicle. Underbite eats metal to become more powerful, and was imprisoned on the Alchemor for devouring Nuon City.
- Hammerstrike (voiced by David Kaye) - A hammerhead shark-motif Sharkticon pirate who transforms into a submarine and wishes to rule Earth's seas.
- Bisk (voiced by Khary Payton) - A cocky and arrogant lobster-motif Decepticon who transforms into a futuristic muscle car and has a strong affinity for video games.
- Chop Shop (voiced by David Hunt) - A Decepticon combiner who is able to split his body into five spider-like Mini-Cons.
  - "Righty" (voiced by Will Friedle) - The right arm component of Chop Shop who evades capture in "More Than Meets the Eye". In "The Trouble with Fixit," the right arm component is reunited with Chop Shop.
- Terrashock (voiced by Kevin Michael Richardson) - A brutish Buffaloid (a bison-like Cybertronian) who transforms into an armored truck and was an enforcer for the Decepticon Contrail prior to his incarceration on the Alchemor.
- Thunderhoof (voiced by Frank Stallone) - An elk-motif Decepticon and a former crime lord back on Cybertron who transforms into a tractor with a thresh attachment. Back on Cybertron, Thunderhoof had Scowl and Silverhound as his mob enforcers.
- Filch (voiced by Constance Zimmer) - A Corvicon (a crow-like Decepticon) who transforms into a robotic crow has an obsession to collect anything shiny.
- Minitron - A Cyber-Tick who can control Cybertronians by biting them. In "True Colors", he worked for Steeljaw to possess Grimlock and is captured by the Autobots.
- Springload (voiced by John Steven Rocha) - An insane Amphiboid (a frog-type Cybertronian) who transforms into a compact pickup truck. He is obsessed with finding the lost city of Doradus, though everyone claims that it a myth. Springload was incarcerated on the Alchemor for attacking museum staff and guards. He is built with acidic skin as a defense mechanism.
- Ped (voiced by Eddie Deezen) - A worm-motif Decepticon who transforms into a tanker truck and was apparently bullied by others of his kind. Ped has the ability to create sinkholes when underground, can dig at high speeds with his giant claws, and possesses pincers that deliver a paralyzing sting.
- Quillfire (voiced by Andy Milder) - A rebellious porcupine-motif Decepticon anarchist who transforms into an armored pick-up truck and wields toxic quills.
- Fracture (voiced by Kevin Pollak) - A Decepticon bounty hunter and Drift's rival who transforms into a purple motorcycle. He originally came to Earth to collect the bounty placed on Bumblebee in "Hunting Season". Fracture later joins Steeljaw's team sometime prior to the episode "Sideways".
  - Airazor and Divebomb (voiced by Roger Craig Smith and Khary Payton respectively) - Fracture's Mini-Con servants who can both transform into torpedoes that attach to Fracture's shoulders.
- Malodor (voiced by Daniel Roebuck) - The leader of a group of four striped skunk-motif Decepticons known as the Skunkticons who can spray a liquid chemical out of their tails that blinds their target. He and his crew all transform into muscle cars resembling the 1969 Chevrolet Nova.
- Clampdown (voiced by Jim Cummings) - A cowardly crab-motif Decepticon who transforms into a modified Ford Focus hatchback. As an informant on Cybertron, Clampdown will rat anyone out to get out of jail including Thunderhoof. Clampdown eventually ended up on Alchemor for trying to blackmail a member of the Autobot High Council.
- Nightstrike (voiced by Tom Kenny) - A polite but murderous Decepticon who transforms into a robotic vampire bat and uses sound waves to entice the worst fears of his prey, so that he can suck their Energon.
- Vertebreak (voiced by Charlie Schlatter) - A snake-motif Decepticon mad scientist who can transform into a train. He was imprisoned on the Alchemor for his illegal cyber-grafting experiments.
- Octopunch (voiced by Ted Biaselli) - An octopus-motif Decepticon pirate who transforms into a submarine. Octopunch was imprisoned on the Alchemor for crashing ships just so he can raid them.
- Groundpounder (voiced by John DiMaggio) - A hot-headed gorilla-motif Decepticon who transforms into an excavator. He was a former Cybertronian gladiator and pro-wrestler of which Fixit was a fan of. Groundpounder was arrested for going on a rampage after being accused of cheating and was incarcerated on Alchemor.
  - Headlock (voiced by Eric Bauza) - Groundpounder's devious coach who transforms into a forklift truck. Along with Overload, Headlock is one of a few prisoners that does not have an animal motif in robot mode or a beast mode.
- Kickback (voiced by Liam O'Brien) - A psychotic, yet idiotic grasshopper-themed Insecticon who can transform into a Blown Top Drag racing car. Going by his namesake, Kickback is highly trained in karate due to his powerful kicks.
- Scowl (voiced by Mark Hildreth) - A Dinobot who transforms into a mechanical Ankylosaurus and uses a Kaboomer, which is a giant sledgehammer. He was a former mob enforcer who worked for Thunderhoof. Much like Grimlock, Scowl likes to smash things for his own entertainment.
- Scratch - A mountain lion-motif Decepticon with laser claw attacks who can transform into a modified 1987 Ford Mustang with monstrous tires.
- Zizza (voiced by Jackée Harry) - A tyrannical queen bee-motif Decepticon who uses a toxin to control the minds of her victims. Both her robot and beast modes are bee-themed. Zizza was incarcerated on the Alchemor for mind-controlling Cybertronians into doing her bidding.
- Pseudo (voiced by Eric Bauza) - A silent, but sneaky ladybug larva-themed Decepticon Shifter and spy with the ability to shapeshift into anything or anyone he desires.
- Overload (voiced by Dave Fennoy) - A Shakespearean-mannered Deception who transforms into a Cybertronian tank. Overload was a Decepticon spy during the Cybertronian War whose efforts greatly damaged the Autobot installations until he was discovered by Optimus Prime which led to him by getting incarcerated aboard the Alchemor.
  - Backtrack and Ransack (both voiced by Steve Blum) - A pair of Cyclone Mini-Cons who join Overload in the two-part "Overloaded". They can both transform into spheres that can attach to Overload's wrists. Bumblebee later convinces the two to turn against Overload.
- Polarclaw (voiced by Steve Blum) - A ballistic polar bear-motif Decepticon with a sonic roar who transforms into an SUV-type snowmobile with a snowplow attached to the front. His appearance and behavior are a homage to the Beast Wars character of the same name. Polarclaw was imprisoned on the Alchemor for his activities as a crime boss on Cybertron.
- Crazybolt (voiced by James Arnold Taylor) - A horned lizard-motif Decepticon arsonist who can transform into a monstrous muscle car resembling a cross between a 1969 Pontiac Firebird and a 1983 Chevrolet Monte Carlo. Crazybolt ended up on the Alchemor for leveling Steel City as the buildings there were impending his mobility.
  - Slicedice (voiced by Gary Anthony Williams) - Crazybolt's devoted monitor lizard-motif Mini-Con partner who can transform into a torpedo.
- Razorpaw (voiced by Jonathan Adams) - A bossy yet nefarious and intimidating puma-motif Decepticon who is Swelter and Glacius' current boss. Razorpaw has the ability to siphon Energon from other Transformers.
  - Swelter and Glacius (voiced by Robbie Rist and Yuri Lowenthal respectively) - A pair of Decepticon Mini-Cons who can both transform into torpedoes and share the same body-type as Divebomb. Swelter possesses fire-elemental abilities while Glacius possesses ice-elemental abilities.
- Torpor - A one-eyed Decepticon Mini-Con who can transform into a torpedo.
- Simacore (voiced by Matthew Yang King) - A temperamental orangutan-motif Decepticon scientist whose shared the same body-type as Groundpounder. Simacore was incarcerated on the Alchemor after an experiment of his went wrong and he took his frustration out on his colleagues.
  - Axiom and Theorem (both voiced by Jeff Bennett) - Simacore's monkey-motif Mini-Con partners who can transform into torpedoes. Axiom is a chimpanzee-motif Mini-Con who has a haughty personality whereas Theorem is a howler monkey-motif Mini-Con who has a snooty personality.
- Decepticon Island Decepticons - The generic inhabitants of Decepticon Island that work for Glowstrike and Scorponok.
  - Decepticon Island Chompazoids - A pair of unnamed Chompazoids residing in Decepticon Island who serve as Glowstrike and Scorponok's "guard dogs".
  - Decepticon Island Insecticon - An unnamed Insecticon soldier residing in Decepticon Island with a black, bright-green, and teal color scheme who shares the same body-type as Razorhorn.
  - Decepticon Island Cyclones - A pair of unnamed Cyclone Mini-Cons residing in Decepticon Island who share the same body-type as Ransack and Backtrack. One is purple while the other is black and green.
  - Kickback's Crush - An unnamed female Decepticon residing in Decepticon Island who transforms into an orange and blue helicopter resembling an RAH-66 Comanche.
  - Decepticon Island Sharkticon #1 - A Sharkticon residing in Decepticon Island who is identical in design to Hammerstrike, but with yellow eyes and a silver and purple color scheme based on the Generation 1 Sharkticons.
  - Decepticon Island Sharkticon #2 - Another Sharkticon residing in Decepticon Island who is also identical in design to Hammerstrike, but with a brown and tan color scheme while also sharing the same yellow eyes as the other Decepticon Island Sharkticon.
- Bludgeon and Clout (both voiced by Dee Bradley Baker) - A pair of medieval-themed Cyclone Mini-Cons partnered with Scorponok who can transform into spiked spheres.
- Hammer and Anvil (both voiced by Carlos Alazraqui) - A pair of Cyclone Mini-Cons who accompanied Bisk into committing a heist during a Rear Axle concert. Hammer's alternate form is a dragon/phoenix creature and can transform into a sphere while Anvil's alternate form has a gargoyle-motif and can transform into a spiked sphere.
- Silverhound (voiced by Eric Bauza) - Silverhound is a bulldog-motif Decepticon who served as a mob enforcer of Thunderhoof.
- Back and Forth (both voiced by Eric Bauza) - A pair of Cyclone Mini-Cons with magnetic abilities who can transform into spheres. Back's robot mode resembles a four-legged creature with stubby arms while Forth's robot mode resembles a lizard-like creature.
- Stockade (voiced by Gregg Berger) - A badger-motif decorative Decepticon general. He tried to stage a military coup, but failed after he was defeated by Optimus Prime and was incarcerated on the Alchemor.
  - Major Mayhems (collectively voiced by Eric Bauza, Gregg Berger, Roger Craig Smith, and Mitchell Whitfield) - A legion of identical Cyclone Mini-Con foot soldiers under the command of Stockade who can all transform into spheres.
- Vehicons (collectively voiced by Jim Cummings and Fred Tatasciore) - A legion of identical Decepticon foot soldiers residing in Decepticon Island that make up the bulk of Glowstrike's army. Some transform into sports cars resembling the EcoJet Concept and others transform into Cybertronain fighter jets.
- Shadelock (voiced by Kirk Thornton) - A Decepticon bounty hunter under the command of Starscream.
  - RoughEdge - A rogue Autobot under the command of Starscream.
  - Razorhorn - An Insecticon soldier under the command of Starscream who transforms into a robotic Hercules beetle.
- Crustacion (voiced by Chris Edgerly) - A shrimp-like Decepticon thief.
- Ragebyte (voiced by Christopher Swindle) - A Sharkticon scientist who can shoot electricity from his mouth. Ragebyte was known for his experiments that involve meshing Cybertronian technology with whatever he can find to invent destructive weapons.
- Zorillor (voiced by Michael Yurchak) - A lone wolf Skunkticon gangster who was incarcerated in the Alchemor while in possession of the Sphere of Doradus.
- Boostwing (voiced by James Arnold Taylor) - A Corvicon who resembles Filch, but with a different color scheme, a beak-like kibble on his head, and a smaller size. With the aid of his two brothers, Boostwing hatched a plan to acquire the gold, the brightest shinies, from the Crown City Gold Depository.
  - Jacknab and Pilfer (both voiced by Robin Atkin Downes) - A pair of Corvicons and Boostwing's brothers who share the same body-type as him but with different color schemes, beak-like kibbles on their heads, and a smaller size.
- Shadow Raker (voiced by Ian James Corlett) - An Insecticon who transforms into a beetle and can generate webbing from his mouth. He is Drift's former mentor as well as the former master of Slipstream and Jetstorm.
- Flamesnort (voiced by Robin Atkin Downes) - A noble bearded dragon-like Decepticon who has been on Earth since the Great War and guards the seismic-shock warhead which would be used against the "evils of the Autobots."
- Mini-Con Clones - An army of sparkless clones of Axiom and Theorem created by Simacore.
- Wingcode (voiced by Constance Zimmer) - A Decepticon who turns into a robotic vampire bat and specializes in using malware on Cybertronians.

=== Thirteen ===
The Thirteen are the original Cybertronians that were created by Primus during his fight with Unicron. Most of the Thirteen currently reside in the Realm of the Primes.

- Micronus Prime (voiced by Adrian Pasdar) - The first Mini-Con who was among the original thirteen Cybertronians created by Primus during his fight with Unicron and currently resides in the Realm of the Primes.
- Vector Prime (voiced by Troy Baker) - A member of the Thirteen who is the guardian of time and space.
- Megatronus Prime / The Fallen (voiced by Gil Gerard) - One of the original Primes of Cybertron who, alongside his twelve colleagues, was created at the beginning of time by Primus to defeat Unicron. Megatronus betrayed the group, murdered Solus Prime, and became the first Decepticon. Originally banished to another realm, Megatronus later escapes and plans to combined the AllSpark and the Anti-Spark to control the universe. His plan fails and he is apparently killed in the process.
- Alpha Trion - A member of the Thirteen who appears in "Enemy of My Enemy" as one of the Autobots that the Decepticons making up the Autobot High Council had blacklisted for helping Optimus Prime.

=== Weaponizer Mini-Cons ===
The Weaponizer Mini-Cons are a type of Mini-Cons who can empower their hosts while in weapon mode while controlling their bodies. They originally sided with the Decepticon Scavengers while being hunted down by Starscream. During the majority of their appearances, they are unaligned. The Weaponizer Mini-Cons eventually allied themselves with the Autobots in "Mini-Con Madness", though they become Autobots themselves by the end of "Worthy." In that same episode, the Weaponizers leave Earth in search of a new home.

- Aerobolt (voiced by Steve Blum) - The bird of prey-motif leader of the Weaponizer Mini-Cons who can transform into a white and blue shield, which doubles as a breastplate that creates a suit of energy armor around its host. He is partnered with Optimus Prime.
- Buzzstrike (voiced by Rick Pasqualone) - A Weaponizer Mini-Con who can transform into a red axe.
- Sawtooth (voiced by Crispin Freeman) - A good-hearted fish monster-motif Weaponizer Mini-Con who can transform into a dark blue trident.
- Tricerashot (voiced by Robbie Rist) - A Triceratops-motif Weaponizer Mini-Con who can transform into an orange blaster cannon.
- Bashbreaker - A Weaponizer Mini-Con who can transform into a large blue hammer.
- Windstrike - A Weaponizer Mini-Con who can transform into a blue sword.
- Lancelon - A knight-themed Weaponizer Mini-Con who can transform into a yellow and purple sword.

=== Activator Mini-Cons ===
The Activators are a type of Mini-Con who can empower a host in vehicle mode, enabling them with flight capabilities and other enhancements.

- Stuntwing - An Activator Mini-Con employed by Soundwave to steal Bumblebee's Decepticon Hunter.
- Trickout - An Activator Mini-Con with wheels for feet employed by Soundwave to retrieve a Decepticon Hunter.
- Hi-Test - An Activator Mini-Con employed by Soundwave to retrieve a Decepticon Hunter. Hi-Test fails to do so and flees from Soundwave to avoid being killed. After Soundwave is defeated, Hi-Test departs to the Shadowzone, where he is able to live without fear of being hunted.
- Goldgear - An Activator Mini-Con who is employed by Soundwave to retrieve Strongarm's Decepticon Hunter.

=== Humans ===
- Russell Clay (voiced by Stuart Allan) - A 10-year-old boy who was sent by his mother to live with his father, Denny. He first encounters Sideswipe which leads him and his father to befriend the Autobots. He is headstrong and constantly begs to join the team on their missions. He is also an avid watcher of horror movies. His father often gives him the nickname "Rusty". Russell has shown he can learn from the Autobots and he becomes a valuable member of the team, alongside his father Denny.
- Denny Clay (voiced by Ted McGinley) - Russell's father who own a scrapyard of collectible items which becomes the Autobot's base of operations. He is also handy with tools and construction which allows him to work alongside Fixit, who in turn allows him to study Cybertronian technology. He also runs interference with the Autobots, using several disguises to help prevent other humans from discovering the Autobot's and Decepticon's existence. Denny tries to be a good father for Russell but does encounter problems. The Autobots, mainly Bumblebee and Fixit, help him overcome these problems. Overall, Denny & Russell become valuable members of the Bee Team.|
- Henrietta "Hank" (voiced by Bailey Gambertoglio) - A neighborhood girl whom Russell befriends while trying to find others to socialize. She is a fan of football and plays it along with her other friends, including Russell.
- Butch (voiced by Will Friedle) - A neighborhood boy whom Russell befriends while trying to find others to socialize.
- Larry LaRue (voiced by John Katovsich) - A greedy collector who will stop at nothing to obtain various items. He apparently has a history with Denny.
- Arnold (voiced by Troy Baker in "As the Kospego Commands!," James Arnold Taylor in "Suspended") - A man who believes in mythological creatures.

== Episodes ==
Season	Episodes	Originally released	
Season	Episodes	First released	Last released
1	26	March 14, 2015	September 12, 2015
2	13	February 20, 2016	May 14, 2016
Miniseries	6	October 22, 2016	December 3, 2016
3	26	April 29, 2017	November 11, 2017

== Cast ==
=== Main cast ===
- Stuart Allan - Russell Clay, Toddler Son (ep. 35)
- Darren Criss - Sideswipe, Son (ep. 28)
- Will Friedle - Bumblebee, Ultra Bee, Butch, Righty, Dispatcher (ep. 1), Motorist (ep. 5), Junior (ep. 7), Security Guard (ep. 10), Game Voice (ep. 12), Father (ep. 28), Security Guard (ep. 34)
- Ted McGinley - Denny Clay, Sea Captain (ep. 3)
- Khary Payton - Grimlock, Bisk, Divebomb, Newsman (ep. 1, 54), Dad (ep. 7), Operator (ep. 10), Bot (ep. 15), Anchorman (ep. 30), Stadium Announcer (ep. 34), Impound Lot Guard (ep. 35), Dispatcher (ep. 46), Proctor #1 (ep. 56)
- Mitchell Whitfield - Fixit, Toolbox, Cinch, Groundskeeper (ep. 4), Museum Staff Member (ep. 5), TV Announcer (ep. 11), Major Mayhem (ep. 37)
- Constance Zimmer - Strongarm, Filch, Wingcode, Matronly Docent (ep. 1, 46), Ship's Computer (ep. 18)

=== Additional voices ===
- Jonathan Adams - Razorpaw
- Carlos Alazraqui - Hammer, Anvil, Nigel (ep. 34)
- Dee Bradley Baker - Bludgeon, Clout
- Troy Baker - Steeljaw, Vector Prime, Arnold (ep. 6), Blue Car Driver (ep. 14)
- Eric Bauza - Drift, Headlock, Pseudo, Silverhound, Back, Forth, Lt. Ziegler (ep. 17), Look-Out (ep. 23), Male Tourist (ep. 24), Police Officer (ep. 26), Scoutmaster #2 (ep. 28), Major Mayhem (ep. 37), Scientist (ep. 48), Radio Commercial Announcer (ep. 51), Instructor (ep. 55), Computer Voice (ep. 56)
- Jeff Bennett - Axiom, Theorem
- Gregg Berger - Stockade, Major Mayhem (ep. 37)
- Ted Biaselli - Octopunch
- Steve Blum - Starscream, Backtrack, Ransack, Polarclaw, Aerobolt
- Kate Bond - Casey (ep. 19, 55)
- Victor Brandt - Scorponok
- Jeffrey Combs - Ratchet
- Ian James Corlett - Shadow Raker
- Peter Cullen - Orion Pax/Optimus Prime
- Jim Cummings - Clampdown, Thermidor, Vehicon Sentry #1 (ep. 38)
- Eddie Deezen - Ped
- Trevor Devall - Hermit (ep. 46, 47), Patrolman #2 (ep. 46)
- John DiMaggio - Groundpounder, Farnum (ep. 19)
- Robin Atkin Downes - Jacknab, Pilfer, Flamesnort
- Chris Edgerly - Crustacion, Video Game Voice (ep. 48)
- Dave Fennoy - Overload
- Crispin Freeman - Sawtooth
- Bailey Gambertoglio - Hank
- Gil Gerard - Megatronus Prime/The Fallen
- Brooke Goldner - Cyberwarp
- Grey Griffin - Glowstrike
- Jackée Harry - Zizza
- Mark Hildreth - Scowl, Automated Announcer (ep. 22)
- David Hunt - Chop Shop
- Danny Jacobs - Brother Gunter (ep. 42)
- John Katovsich - Larry LaRue (ep. 7)
- David Kaye - Hammerstrike, Slashmark, Announcer (ep. 55)
- Mikey Kelley - Heatseeker, Heatmark, Opposing Captain (ep. 46)
- Tom Kenny - Nightstrike, Police Officer (ep. 15)
- Arif S. Kinchen - Jazz
- Matthew Yang King - Simacore, Computer Voice (ep. 32)
- Maurice LaMarche - Dragstrip, Dragbreak
- Harry Lennix - Cyclonus
- Erica Lindbeck - Windblade (season 3)
- Yuri Lowenthal - Glacius
- Edie McClurg - Realtor (ep. 41)
- Andy Milder - Quillfire, Father (ep. 35)
- Max Mittelman - Blurr
- Liam O'Brien - Underbite, Kickback, Cybertron Museum Guard #1 (ep. 1)
- Adrian Pasdar - Micronus Prime
- Rick Pasqualone - Buzzstrike
- Lori Petty - Nightra
- Kevin Pollak - Fracture, Tour Boat Captain (ep. 14)
- Kevin Michael Richardson - Bulkhead, Terrashock, Gallery Narrator (ep. 5)
- Robbie Rist - Tricerashot, Swelter
- John Steven Rocha - Springload
- Daniel Roebuck - Malodor, Computer Voice (ep. 13)
- Charlie Schlatter - Vertebreak
- David Sheinkopf - Dropforge
- Roger Craig Smith - Slipstream, Jetstorm, Airazor, Blastwave, Scoutmaster #1 (ep. 28), Major Mayhem (ep. 37)
- André Sogliuzzo - Clawtrap
- Kath Soucie - Tour Guide (ep. 24)
- Jason Spisak - Paralon
- Frank Stallone - Thunderhoof
- Raymond Stein - Police Officer (ep. 7)
- Christopher Swindle - Ragebyte
- Fred Tatasciore - Saberhorn, Night Watchman (ep. 29), Vehicon Guard #1 (ep. 38)
- James Arnold Taylor - Crazybolt, Boostwing, Arnold (ep. 30), Teenage Boy (ep. 53)
- Kirk Thornton - Shadelock
- Robin Weigert - Scatterspike
- Frank Welker - Soundwave, Mayor's Secretary (ep. 66)
- Gary Anthony Williams - Slicedice, Dad (ep. 30)
- Travis Willingham - Motormaster, Menasor
- Dave Wittenberg - Wildbreak
- Kristy Wu - Windblade (seasons 1–2), Newswoman (ep. 5), Woman's Voice (ep. 10), Pilot (ep. 23), Mother (ep. 28)
- Michael Yurchak - Zorillor

== Broadcast ==
=== United States ===
The series was originally planned to premiere on what was known as the Hub Network (a joint venture between Hasbro and Discovery Communications). However, on October 7, 2014, just days before the channel's re-branding as Discovery Family that took place on October 13, it was announced that the series would premiere on Cartoon Network instead. Hasbro Studios president Stephen Davis felt that Cartoon Network was a more appropriate home for a Transformers series due to its male-oriented demographics, having felt that Hub Network had been skewed towards girls. Previous animated Transformers series had also aired on Cartoon Network before the launch of the joint venture and Hasbro Studios.

The series debuted with a special prime time premiere of the two-part pilot on March 14, 2015, followed by the regular time slot debut, starting with an encore of "Pilot" Pt. 1, on March 21.

Season 2 ran from February 20 to May 14, 2016. The six-part miniseries premiered on October 22 and concluded on December 3.

Season 3 ran from April 29 to November 11, 2017. It was the third and final season.

=== Japan ===
In Japan, the series premiered in Japan on Animax, where it was known as Transformers Adventure for its first two seasons, and Transformers Adventure: Prime of Micron for the special miniseries between seasons 2 and 3. Season 1 took a break after episode 13 on June 14 and picked up again on September 20 with episode 14.

The songs "Save the Future!!" and "Try (Transformers: Adventure)" replace the original opening and closing themes, respectively.

=== International ===
On January 13, 2015, it was announced that Cartoon Network has acquired the rights to broadcast the series worldwide, similarly to the global distribution of Prime before it.

Several countries have premiered the series before the United States. On February 9, Canal J premiered the series in France, making it the first in the world to broadcast it on television. On March 2, Biggs premiered it in Portugal. In Italy, K2 aired the pilot on March 7, followed by the official premiere on March 9. On March 13, Cartoon Network Arabic premiered the Arabic version of the series.

Among English-speaking countries, Cartoon Network in Australia was first to debut the series, having premiered it on February 21. On March 7, the series debuted in the United Kingdom. In Canada, the show premiered on Teletoon on March 21. The series premiered on May 23, 2015, on Cartoon Network India. as well as on Cartoon Network Southeast Asia. The series also aired on Toonami in India in English. In Croatia, the series debuted on April 23, 2018, in RTL Kockica channel.

Season 1 made its debut on CITV weekday morning lineup on January 4, 2016. Season 2 first aired on CITV in March 2016 in the UK.

== Home media ==
Shout Factory released the first five episodes onto DVD titled A New Autobot Mission on October 27, 2015. They released the complete first season on May 10, 2016.

In Australia, Beyond International released the complete first season onto DVD on September 1, 2015; they also released a single-disc DVD comprising the first seven episodes on the same day.
