= Trivium (disambiguation) =

The trivium is the lower division of the seven liberal arts and comprises grammar, logic, and rhetoric.

Trivium may also refer to:

- Trivium (band), an American metal band from Orlando, Florida
- Trivium (cipher), a synchronous stream cipher
- Trivium (journal), a scientific journal

== See also ==
- Trivia (disambiguation)
