= Trivial Pursuit (British game show) =

- Genre: Game show
- Presented by: Rory McGrath; Tony Slattery
- Country of origin: United Kingdom
- Original language: English
- No. of series: 1 (BBC1); 2 (The Family Channel)
- No. of episodes: 16 (BBC1) ?? (The Family Channel)

Production
- Running time: 30 minutes (inc. adverts)
- Production companies: Initial (1990); Action Time (1993–1994)

Original release
- Network: BBC1 (1990); The Family Channel (1993–1994)
- Release: 4 September 1990 – 1994

Related
- Trivial Pursuit

Trivial Pursuit is a game show loosely based on the board game of the same name. The show first aired on BBC1 from 4 September to 18 December 1990 hosted by Rory McGrath. It was revived on The Family Channel from 6 September 1993 to 1994 hosted by Tony Slattery.

== Gameplay (1993-94) ==
On each episode, three contestants compete for the chance to win a holiday trip. Each contestant has a scoreboard divided into six wedges in the style of the board game playing pieces, with each wedge further subdivided into outer and inner halves. Whenever a contestant correctly answers a question in a given category, one half-wedge in that colour lights up on their board as long as they do not already have both. An incorrect answer allows either opponent to buzz-in and respond, but they must wait to do so until an audible signal has been played; buzzing-in too early freezes the contestant out.

=== Round 1 ===
This round uses the same six categories as in the original Trivial Pursuit board game:

- Geography (Blue)
- Entertainment (Pink)
- History (Yellow)
- Art & Literature (Red)
- Science & Nature (Green)
- Sport & Leisure (Orange)

On each turn, the contestant in control selects an available category and is given first chance to answer a question in it. Each category is removed from play after being chosen once, after which the list is reset and all six become available on every turn. Contestants receive three turns apiece in this round.

=== Round 2: Film and TV ===
Categories for this round are as follows:

- Personalities (Blue)
- Titles (Pink)
- Classics (Yellow)
- Portrayals (Red)
- Drama (Green)
- Wild Card (Orange)

One pass is played through the list as in Round 1, with two turns per contestant and some questions incorporating visual elements in the form of photographs or film/television footage. Some categories are secretly designated as Bonus Questions, asked in two parts. If a contestant answers the first part correctly, they earn a half-wedge and can then attempt to take one away from an opponent by answering the second.

The contestant in control may not choose a category for which they have already earned both half-wedges.

=== Round 3: Trivia Tactics ===
A new set of categories is used for this round, and the contestant with initial control must choose one for the next opponent in sequence. However, they may not choose a category that the opponent no longer needs. Each contestant receives three turns, and all six categories are available throughout the round.

=== Round 4: Control Round ===
The original Trivial Pursuit categories are used again and remain available throughout. The host asks a toss-up question open to all on the buzzer, and the first contestant to respond correctly may then choose a category and have first chance to answer a question. They keep control as long as they continue answering correctly, but a miss allows either opponent to buzz in and claim the half-wedge at stake as well as control. If no one answers a question correctly, the host asks a new toss-up to award control.

The first contestant to light all 12 half-wedges on their board wins the game and advances to the Final.

=== Final ===
The contestant has 60 seconds to answer one question in each of the six original categories, starting with Geography and proceeding through the list in the above order. Passed or missed categories can be replayed after going through all six if time allows, with a new question being asked. Completing all categories within the time limit awards a holiday.

== Transmissions ==
=== BBC1 ===
Series	Start date	End date	Episodes
1	4 September 1990	18 December 1990	16

=== The Family Channel ===
Series	Start date	End date	Episodes
1	1 September 1993	1993	??
2	1994	1994	65
