= Grimlock =

Transformers character

- Transformers character
- G1 design for Grimlock
- First appearance: The Transformers
- Based on: Dinosaur Robo by Takara
- Voiced by: Gregg Berger, Takurō Kitagawa, others

In-universe information
- Affiliation: Autobots

Grimlock is a fictional character of the Transformers franchise. He is usually portrayed as the leader of the Dinobots, a faction of Autobots who can transform into dinosaurs. Grimlock is able to transform into a mechanical Tyrannosaurus and is known for his brutish personality and opposition to authority, including that of Optimus Prime.

== History ==
The original Generation 1 Grimlock toy in its dinosaur mode

The original Grimlock Transformers toy by Hasbro was a re-release of a Japanese Dinosaur Robo toy from Takara. Dinosaur Robo was itself a spin-off of Takara's Diaclone toy line. When they were released into the US, Grimlock and the other Dinobots were the best-selling toys of 1985.

In the Generation 1 continuity, as depicted in the 1980s cartoon, Grimlock is the king of the Dinobots. He debuted in the episode "S.O.S. Dinobots". The Dinobots are a faction of Autobots that can transform into mechanical dinosaurs, with Grimlock being able to transform into a Tyrannosaurus. Despite being Autobots, they act independently of the rest of their faction and are noted for their violent and rebellious attitudes. In the 1980s cartoon, Grimlock and the Dinobots are invented by the Autobot scientist Wheeljack, who intentionally gives them low intelligence, resulting in them speaking in the third person and having voices similar to stereotypical cavemen. Because of their brute strength, the Dinobots often fight against combined Transformers such as Devastator. Grimlock is voiced in the original cartoon by Gregg Berger in English and by Takurō Kitagawa in Japanese.

After the original cartoon, Grimlock returns in the Beast Wars: Transformers toy line. In this toy line, Grimlock is a member of the Maximals that transforms into a Velociraptor similar to the character Dinobot. This version of Grimlock is white with black spots, which caused fans to nickname him "Dalmatian Grimlock". The English localization of the 2000 Robots in Disguise anime uses Grimlock's name for the Japanese character Build Hurricane, although this character has little resemblance to the original version. He transforms into a green excavator instead of a dinosaur. Grimlock returns again in the 2015 Robots in Disguise cartoon, this time more closely resembling his original counterpart, but using the green color scheme of the 2000 version. Grimlock appears in Transformers: Cyberworld as an opponent of Optimus Prime.

Michael Bay initially did not want the Dinobots to appear in the live-action Transformers series, saying that he "hated" them. Despite this, Grimlock and the Dinobots are included in the live-action film Transformers: Age of Extinction. In the film, Optimus Prime rides on the back of Grimlock's Tyrannosaurus mode for transportation.

While Grimlock is most well-known for transforming into a dinosaur, he has had other forms in different adaptations. In the Transformers: Alternators toy line, Grimlock transforms into a Ford Mustang, while in the Device Label line he transforms from a dinosaur into a functioning computer mouse. The Transformers: the War Within comic depicts Grimlock as transforming into an artillery tank prior to his arrival on Earth. In Transformers: the Beast Within, Grimlock combines with the other Dinobots into a misshapen, zombie-like creature called the Beast. In some continuities, Grimlock can also combine with the Dinobots to form a large robot called Volcanicus.

== Bibliography ==
- Furman, Simon (2004). Transformers: The Ultimate Guide. DK Publishing Inc. pp. 30, 65. ISBN 1405304618.
