= My Little Pony: Forever Friendship =

Animated web series

- Forever Friendship logo as of 2026
- Genre: Fantasy; Adventure
- Created by: Gretchen Mallorie
- Based on: My Little Pony: Friendship Is Magic by Lauren Faust
- Showrunner: Gretchen Mallorie
- Directed by: Tayhan Mustafa
- Voices of: Jenna Weir; Ava Preston; Kayla Samson; Kaya Kanashiro
- Theme music composer: Jessica Charlotte Vaugn
- Opening theme: "Forever Friendship"
- Ending theme: "What's Next?"

Production
- Running time: 9 minutes
- Production companies: Lil Critter Workshop; Hasbro Entertainment,

Original release
- Network: YouTube

My Little Pony: Forever Friendship is an upcoming animated web series created by Gretchen Mallorie and directed by Tayhan Mustafa. It is based on Hasbro's My Little Pony franchise and animated by Lil Critter Workshop. It is scheduled for release on YouTube in early 2027. It will serve as the sixth installment of the My Little Pony franchise, also referred to as "G6", and each episode will have a run time of about 9 minutes.

== Cast and characters ==
- Jenna Weir as Twilight Sparkle, a studious and socially naïve unicorn who loves to read.
- Kayla Samson as Fluttershy, a timid pegasus who loves animals.
- Kaya Kanashiro as Pinkie Pie, an energetic earth pony who enjoys throwing parties.
- Ava Preston as Rainbow Dash, an egotistical, sporty pegasus.

== Music ==
The show will have a new theme song, titled "Forever Friendship", sung by singer Cali Rodi, and produced by Super Weirdo Productions. The current theme song is a special cover performed by the voice actors and featured within the show.
