= Trivial Pursuit (American game show) =

US television series

- Genre: Game show
- Developed by: Bill Hillier; Wink Martindale; Peter R. Berlin; Rob Fiedler
- Directed by: Rob Fiedler; John Adams
- Presented by: Wink Martindale; LeVar Burton
- Announcer: Randy West
- Country of origin: United States
- No. of seasons: 2 (1993–1994 version); 2 (2024 version)
- No. of episodes: 130 (1993–1994 version); 41 (2024 version)

Production
- Executive producers: Bill Hillier; Wink Martindale; LeVar Burton; David Garfinkle; Gabriel Marano; John de Mol; Matt Pritchard; Matt Walton
- Producers: Peter R. Berlin; Rob Fiedler
- Running time: 22 minutes
- Production companies: LeVar Burton Entertainment (2024–present); Talpa Studios (2024–present); Lionsgate Alternative Television (2024–present); Hasbro Entertainment (2024–present)

Original release
- Network: The Family Channel
- Release: June 7, 1993 – December 30, 1994
- Network: The CW
- Release: October 3, 2024 – present

Related
- Trivial Pursuit

Trivial Pursuit is an American game show that ran on The Family Channel from June 7, 1993 to December 30, 1994. Loosely based on the board game of the same name, it was initially hosted by Wink Martindale with Randy West announcing.

A revival hosted by LeVar Burton premiered on October 3, 2024, on The CW. On May 19, 2025, the revival was renewed for a second season, which premiered on January 22, 2026. On August 3, 2026, the revival was renewed for a third season which is expected to air in 2027.

== Format ==
The show is played in two halves. The first half is an interactive game show, while the other half is a traditional game show.

=== Interactive game ===
Nine players (originally twelve) compete for three spots in the second half of the show.

In the first round, five questions with four multiple-choice answers are asked by the host. The players have 10 seconds to answer by pressing a number from 1–4 on a keypad in front of them. They score points based on how fast they answer the question correctly, with a maximum of 1,000 points available. After five questions, the six players with the highest scores play round two and the other players are eliminated.

In the second round, the scores are reset and the three highest-scoring players win a prize and a chance to play Trivial Pursuit in the next half-hour show.

=== Classic game ===
==== First three rounds ====
As in the board game, the object for each player is to fill in all of the colored wedges on a large pie-shaped game board in front of them. Each wedge is a different color and represents a different category, with the categories requiring two correct answers to fill a wedge. Red replaces the brown (now purple) wedge from the board games.

In the first three rounds, each player receives two turns consisting of a category choice followed by a question posed by host Martindale. A correct answer lights up a wedge, but an incorrect answer gives the two opponents a chance to ring-in and steal the wedge with a correct answer.

The categories that are used for the first three rounds are listed below. The first round used the categories of the original version of the Trivial Pursuit board game, while the second round used the categories from Trivial Pursuit: Movie Edition or Trivial Pursuit: Television Edition. In the third round, a new set of categories is played; these categories are borrowed from multiple versions of the board game. (In early episodes, the questions related to a certain year in history.)

Color	Round 1	Round 2		Round 3					
Color	Round 1	Movies Edition	Television Edition	Set A	Set B	Set C	Set D	Set E	Set F
Blue	Geography	Settings	Classics	Personalities	People & Places	Personalities	People & Places	World of Places	Products & Progress
Pink	Entertainment	Titles	Sitcoms	Entertainment	Entertainment	Entertainment	Good Times	World of Music	Sports & Leisure
Yellow	History	Off Screen	Drama	In the News	History	Headlines	Science & Technology	World of People	History
Red	Art & Literature	On Screen	Kids & Games	Around the World	Science & Nature	Music	Art & Culture	World of Fantasy	Personalities
Green	Science & Nature	Production	Stars	Sports & Leisure	Sports & Leisure	Sports & Leisure	Natural World	World of Science	Entertainment
Orange	Sports & Leisure	Portrayals	Wild Card	Wild Card	Wild Card	Wild Card	Games & Hobbies	World of Leisure	Wild Card

Rounds 2 and 3 include three bonus questions hidden behind three of the categories—one in one half of the round and two in the other. When chosen, the first part of the bonus question would involve a photo, an audio or video clip. Whichever player answered the first part of the question correctly earned a wedge and an opportunity to answer a follow-up question, which awards the player $100 and another half-wedge in the color of their choice with a correct answer.

===== Final round =====
The final round again uses the traditional basic categories as in the first round, but the round is played in a different manner. The round starts with a toss-up question, and the first player to ring-in and answer correctly is given control of the game, keeping it as long as he/she keeps answering questions correctly.

If the player in control misses a question, the question is fielded as a toss-up for the other two players, and the one who answers correctly receives control and the half-wedge, if it has not already been filled in on their pie. If nobody answers correctly, another toss-up is played to determine control.

The final round continues in this manner until either a player completely fills in their pie, therefore becoming the day's champion, or time is called, whichever happens first (a warning tone chimes 4 times signaling one minute left in the final round if it occurs). If time is called, the player who has filled in the most wedges in their pie is declared the champion.

The winner of the game receive $500 and a bonus prize and advances to the Trivial Pursuit Challenge Round.

==== The Trivial Pursuit Challenge Round ====
The day's champion plays the bonus for a trip and $1,000 in cash.

To accomplish this, the champion needs to correctly answer one question in each of the six basic categories within 45 seconds. Each category is played one question at a time in sequence, starting with Geography and ending in Sports & Leisure.

Answering a question in a category correctly causes its respective wedge to light up in the pie. Answering incorrectly or passing leaves the wedge blank until a question is answered correctly.

Each wedge lit up awards the contestant $100. The grand prize is awarded if the champion manages to fill the pie within the time limit.

==== Audience game ====
If there is extra time at the end of the show, an audience member is called on stage and given the opportunity to answer five multiple-choice questions (much like the "Interactive" portion of the show) worth $20 apiece, for a maximum payoff of $100.

== Interactive components ==
The show launched a series of "interactive" games called playbreaks, all produced by Martindale and his associates. Originally, ten "Trivial Pursuit" playbreaks were interspersed throughout FAM's game show block. Three of them were during Trivial Pursuit: The Interactive Game and one was during Trivial Pursuit: The Classic Game.

During playbreaks, a question is shown on screen with four choices, and the answer is revealed 10 seconds later. During its original run, home viewers were given an opportunity to call a special 1–900 number ($4.98 per call) and play a "TP: Interactive Game", using a slightly modified scoring system, and players answered by using their touch-tone telephone. The winner of each "playbreak" won a prize and competed on Friday in a playoff game against the other winners for a vacation. The ad would last about 100 seconds, as seen by an on-screen clock (even though the clock read ":99" as it faded in).

On New Year's Day 1994, all of the weekly playoff winners up to that point were given the opportunity to compete in a "Tournament of Champions"-style grand playoff for a 1994 Ford Explorer, which aired in between a Trivial Pursuit marathon FAM was running that day. The winner of the Ford Explorer was Alisa Standow.

Trivial Pursuit proved popular in its initial airing during the summer of 1993, as The Family Channel's ratings vastly increased during the 12:30–1:00 pm time slot. MTM Entertainment, an independent distribution company owned by the network's parent organization, International Family Entertainment, planned to syndicate a new version of the show to local stations for the 1994–1995 season. The plan was to produce 130 new episodes and air them along with the 130 episodes already taped for The Family Channel. However, efforts to interest local stations were largely unsuccessful, and the syndicated version never materialized.

Other interactive games aired on the network – a board-game adaptation of Boggle, the list-oriented Shuffle, and an adaptation of the newspaper game Jumble.

== Home game ==
A home version of the game was released by Parker Brothers in 1993 as Trivial Pursuit Game Show. Some question material was taken directly from the show, and the box cover featured Martindale on the slightly different set of the show's 1993 pilot (which was intended for syndication; producer Jay Wolpert also produced at least one pilot in 1987 with Worldvision Enterprises that was not picked up; Martindale posted both pilots to his YouTube channel in 2014). This was the second home version that was based on a board game itself; the first was TV Scrabble by Selchow & Righter in 1987 and then Celebrity Name Game (based on the board game Identity Crisis) by PlayMonster (formerly Patch) in 2016.

== 2024 revival ==
In February 2024, it was announced that Trivial Pursuit would be revived and air on The CW, with LeVar Burton as host. The first season, which consists of twenty-six half-hour episodes presented as thirteen hour-long broadcasts, premiered on October 3, 2024.

Each game is played in three rounds, all using the standard colors and Trivial Pursuit categories as follows:

Color	Category
Pink	Entertainment
Blue	Geography
Orange	Sports & Leisure
Green	Science & Nature
Yellow	History
Purple	Art & Literature

Round 1: Around the Board

One category is chosen at random to start the game, and the host asks a toss-up question for which any player may buzz in. A correct answer awards 100 points and a wedge in that category's color, and the player may choose the category for the next question. From this point on, a contestant who correctly answers a question scores the points and earns the appropriate wedge if they do not already have it. Three passes are played in this round, and each category may only be used once per pass. During the first season, contestants received 200 additional points for each wedge obtained (up to a maximum of 1200) after all eighteen questions were asked. Beginning with the second season, bonus points were no longer awarded; contestants who obtained all six wedges instead received a $1,000 prize.

The player with the lowest score at the end of the third pass is eliminated. If a tie occurs for second place at the end of the round, one final question is asked; the first player to buzz in with the correct answer advances.

Round 2: Category Paths

Each player selects five of the six categories and arranges them in any desired order. The host alternates between players, starting with the player with the lowest score (or the player who had obtained the fewest wedges in the slowest time in the event of a tie at the end of the first round), and asks one question at a time in the chosen category sequence. All questions in this round are multiple-choice, with three answer options. A player's first question is worth 200 points, and the value increases by 200 per successive question to 1,000 on the fifth. After all 10 questions have been played, or if it becomes impossible for one player to catch up, the high scorer advances to the Final Pursuit. Ties at the end of the round are broken in the same manner as in the first round.

Final Pursuit

The player has a set time limit (60 seconds in the first season; 45 from the second season onward) to correctly answer one question in each of the six categories, starting with the one of their choice and moving clockwise around the circle. The clock begins to run once the host finishes asking the first question. A correct answer lights that wedge, while a pass or miss leaves it in play; in either case, the host moves on to the next category in sequence. Passed/missed categories can be played again once the player proceeds around the circle to them, if time allows. The player wins $20,000 for lighting all six wedges before time runs out, or $1,000 per lit wedge otherwise.

Beginning in the second season, returning champions were introduced; contestants continued to play until they were defeated or have won a total of five consecutive games.

== International versions ==
Country	Name	Presenter(s)	Channel(s)	Premiere	Finale
Austria	Trivial Pursuit	Bernadette Schneider	ORF	February 9, 1991	December 28, 1991
France	Trivial Pursuit	Fabrice and Marie-Ange Nardi	Antenne 2	1988	1990
France	Trivial Pursuit	Georges Beller and Marie-Ange Nardi	Antenne 2	1988	1990
France	Trivial Pursuit	Gaël Leforestier	France 2	2002	2003
France	Trivial Pursuit	Frédéric Joly	France 2	2002	2003
Germany	Trivial Pursuit	Birgit Lechtermann	VOX	1993	1994
Soviet Union; Russia	Счастливый случай Schastlivyy sluchay	Larisa Verbitskaya (1989–1990); Mikhail Marfin (1989–2000)	Programme One (1989–1991); Channel 1 Ostankino (1991–1995); ORT (1995–1999); TV Centre (2000)	September 9, 1989	August 26, 2000
Spain	Trivial Pursuit	Silvia Jato	Veo7	January 24, 2011	May 2011
Spain	Trivial Pursuit	Egoitz Txurruka	La 1	February 13, 2026	March 20, 2026
Spain	Trivial Pursuit	Egoitz Txurruka	La 2	March 23, 2026	present
United Kingdom	Trivial Pursuit	Rory McGrath	BBC1	September 4, 1990	December 18, 1990
United Kingdom	Trivial Pursuit	Tony Slattery	The Family Channel	September 6, 1993	1994

== See also ==
- Trivial Pursuit
- Board game
- Game show
- Счастливый случай – analog in Russia
