= List of My Friends Tigger & Pooh episodes =

My Friends Tigger & Pooh is an American animated children's television series that aired on the Playhouse Disney block on Disney Channel. Inspired by A. A. Milne's Winnie-the-Pooh, the series was developed by Walt Disney Television Animation. It originally aired in the United States from May 12, 2007, to October 9, 2010.

Voice actors in the series included child actor Oliver Dillon as the voice of Lumpy the Heffalump.

== Series overview ==
| Season | Episodes | Originally aired | |
| Season | Episodes | First aired | Last aired |
|---|---|---|---|
| 1 | 26 | May 12, 2007 | September 1, 2008 |
| 2 | 19 | September 27, 2008 | July 12, 2009 |
| 3 | 18 | September 8, 2009 | October 9, 2010 |
| Films | 3 films | December 6, 2008 | April 10, 2010 |

== Episodes ==
=== Season 1 (2007–08) ===
| No. overall | No. in season | Title | Directed by | Written by | Storyboarded by | Original release date |
|---|---|---|---|---|---|---|
| 1 | 1 | "Rabbit's Ruta-wakening" "Tigger's Shadow of a Doubt" | Don MacKinnon David Hartman | Dean Stefan Nicole Dubuc | Roy C. Meurin Kirk Van Wormer | May 12, 2007 |
| 2 | 2 | "How to Say I Love Roo" "Piglet's Small Predicament" | David Hartman Don MacKinnon | Brian Hohlfeld Nicole Dubuc | Ken Laramay Phil Weinstein | May 13, 2007 |
| 3 | 3 | "Piglet's Piglet's Echo Echo" "Roo's Kite-Tastrophy" | Don MacKinnon David Hartman | Brian Hohlfeld | Bob Foster Jay Oliva | May 19, 2007 |
| 4 | 4 | "Eeyore's Tale of the Missing Tail" "Pooh, Light up My Life" | Don MacKinnon David Hartman | Dean Stefan Brian Hohlfeld | Jason A. Dorf Kurt Anderson | May 20, 2007 |
| 5 | 5 | "Lumpy Spends the Night" "Good Night to Pooh" | David Hartman Don MacKinnon | Brian Hohlfeld Nicole Dubuc | Kirk Van Wormer Roy Meurin | May 26, 2007 |
| 6 | 6 | "Eeyore's Sad Day" "Tigger's Bedtime For Bouncer" | David Hartman Don MacKinnon | Brian Hohlfeld Nicole Dubuc | Kirk Van Wormer Roy Meurin | June 2, 2007 |
| 7 | 7 | "No Rumbly in Pooh's Tumbly" "Pooh Sticks Get Stuck" | David Hartman Don MacKinnon | Dean Stefan | Kurt Anderson Jason Dorf | June 9, 2007 |
| 8 | 8 | "Buster’s Ruff Day" "Lumpy’s Pet Project" | David Hartman Don MacKinnon | Brian Hohlfeld Nicole Dubuc | Phil Weinstein Ken Laramay | June 16, 2007 |
| 9 | 9 | "You Ain’t Just Whistlin' Tigger" "Piglet's Hole Problem" | Don MacKinnon David Hartman | Dean Stefan | Bob Foster Jay Oliva | June 23, 2007 |
| 10 | 10 | "Tigger Goes For the Jagular" "Rabbit's New Roomie" | Don MacKinnon David Hartman | Nicole Dubuc and Dean Stefan Brian Hohlfeld | Phil Weinstein Ken Laramay | July 7, 2007 |
| 11 | 11 | "Pooh-Rates of the Hundred Acre Wood" | David Hartman | Nicole Dubuc | Jay Oliva | July 21, 2007 |
| 11 | 11 | "Tigger's Hiccup Pick-Up" | Don MacKinnon | Eileen Cabiling and Erika Grediaga | Bob Foster | July 21, 2007 |
| 12 | 12 | "Darby's Tail" | Don MacKinnon | Cate Lieuwen | Roy C. Meurin | August 4, 2007 |
| 12 | 12 | "Tigger's Delivery Service" | David Hartman | Dean Stefan | Kirk Van Wormer | August 4, 2007 |
| 13 | 13 | "Super-Sized Darby" | David Hartman | Eileen Cabiling & Erika Grediaga | Jay Oliva | September 1, 2007 |
| 13 | 13 | "Piglet's Lightning Frightening" | Don MacKinnon | Nicole Dubuc | Daniel Riba | September 1, 2007 |
| 14 | 14 | "Chasing Pooh's Rainbow" | David Hartman | Nicole Dubuc | Kirk Van Wormer | September 7, 2007 |
| 14 | 14 | "Lumpy Mixes a Mystery" | Don MacKinnon | Janna King Kalichman | Roy Meurin | September 7, 2007 |
| 15 | 15 | "Porcupine's Pen Pal" | Don MacKinnon | Brian Hohlfeld | Sharon Forward | September 22, 2007 |
| 15 | 15 | "Piglet's Thousand and One Watermelons" | David Hartman | Eileen Cabiling and Erika Grediaga | Kurt Anderson | September 22, 2007 |
| 16 | 16 | "Eeyore's Trip To The Moon" | Don MacKinnon | Brian Hohlfeld | Dan Kubat | October 6, 2007 |
| 16 | 16 | "The Incredible Shrinking Roo" | David Hartman | Dean Stefan | Jay Oliva | October 6, 2007 |
| 17 | 17 | "Eeyore's Home Sweet Home" | Don MacKinnon | Nicole Dubuc | Broni Likomanov | October 20, 2007 |
| 17 | 17 | "Rabbit's Prize Pumpkin" | David Hartman | Dean Stefan | Ken Laramay | October 20, 2007 |
| 18 | 18 | "Many Thanks for Christopher Robin" | Don MacKinnon | Nicole Dubuc | Roy Meurin | November 10, 2007 |
| 18 | 18 | "Turtle's Need for Speed" | David Hartman | Brian Hohlfeld | Kirk Van Wormer | November 10, 2007 |
| 19 | 19 | "Pooh's Double Trouble" | Don MacKinnon | Nicole Dubuc | Sharon Forward | November 10, 2007 |
| 19 | 19 | "Eeyore Sleeps on It" | David Hartman | Brian Hohlfeld | Kurt Anderson | November 10, 2007 |
| 20 | 20 | "Darby's Tooth and Nothin' But the Tooth" | Don MacKinnon | Dean Stefan | Bob Foster | December 1, 2007 |
| 20 | 20 | "Snow Problem Roo" | David Hartman | Dean Stefan | Jay Oliva | December 1, 2007 |
Note: This episode first aired on Playhouse Disney Europe and Playhouse Disney Asia in October 2007, almost two months before it premiered in North America.
| 21 | 21 | "Symphony for a Rabbit" | Don MacKinnon | Dean Stefan | Jason Dorf and Wendy Grieb | January 19, 2008 (Note: This episode was first released in Super Sleuth Christmas Movie DVD on November 20, 2007.) |
| 21 | 21 | "Tigger Goes Snowflaky" | David Hartman | Brian Hohlfeld | Kurt Anderson | January 19, 2008 |
| 22 | 22 | "Buster's Bath" | David Hartman | Brian Hohlfeld | Kurt Anderson | February 16, 2008 |
| 22 | 22 | "Once in a Pooh Moon" | Don MacKinnon | Greg Pincus | Wendy Grieb | February 16, 2008 |
| 23 | 23 | "Lumpy's Alvin Goes to Pieces" | David Hartman | Eileen Cabiling and Erika Grediaga | Kurt Anderson | March 21, 2008 |
| 23 | 23 | "Rabbit's Eggcellent Adventure" | Don MacKinnon | Nicole Dubuc | Wendy Grieb | March 21, 2008 |
| 24 | 24 | "Flowers From Roo" | David Hartman | Nicole Dubuc | Ken Laramay | May 16, 2008 |
| 24 | 24 | "Peck Peck Peckin' on Rabbit's Door" | Don MacKinnon | Eileen Cabiling and Erika Grediaga | Phil Weinstein | May 16, 2008 |
| 25 | 25 | "Christopher Froggin'" | David Hartman | Brian Hohlfeld | Ken Laramay | August 31, 2008 |
| 25 | 25 | "Piglet's Rocky Problem" | Don MacKinnon | Greg Pincus | Broni Likomanov | August 31, 2008 |
| 26 | 26 | "Darby, Solo Sleuth" | Don MacKinnon | Dean Stefan | Broni Likomanov | September 1, 2008 (Note: This episode was first released in Friendly Tails DVD on March 4, 2008.) |
| 26 | 26 | "Doggone Buster" | David Hartman | Nicole Dubuc | Ken Laramay | September 1, 2008 |

=== Season 2 (2008–09) ===
| No. overall | No. in season | Title | Directed by | Written by | Storyboarded by | Original release date |
|---|---|---|---|---|---|---|
| 27 | 1 | "Darby Goes Woozle Sleuthin'" "How The Tigger Lost His Stripe" | David Hartman Don MacKinnon | Eileen Cabiling & Erika Grediaga Dean Stefan | Jay Oliva Sharon Forward | September 27, 2008 |
| 28 | 2 | "Tigger Gets Bounced" "Super Sleuths Wait for Ever" | David Hartman Don MacKinnon | Nicole Dubuc Brian Hohlfeld | Ken Laramay Wendy Grieb | September 27, 2008 |
| 29 | 3 | "Pooh's Cookie Tree" "Lumpy Joins In" | David Hartman Don MacKinnon | Eileen Cabiling & Erika Grediaga Nicole Dubuc | Kurt Anderson Troy Adomitis | September 28, 2008 |
| 30 | 4 | "Small's World After All" "Darby's Fog-Gone Mystery" | Don MacKinnon David Hartman | Brian Hohlfeld Dean Stefan | Holly Forsyth Robert Griffith | September 28, 2008 |
| 31 | 5 | "Rabbit's Sound of Silence" "Eager Beaver" | David Hartman Don MacKinnon | Eileen Cabiling & Erika Grediaga | Jay Oliva Sharon Forward | October 4, 2008 |
| 32 | 6 | "Pooh's Bees Buzz Off" "Buster's Buried Treasure" | David Harrtman Don MacKinnon | Nicole Dubuc Dean Stefan | Robert Griffin Holly Forsyth | October 18, 2008 |
| 33 | 7 | "No More Honey for Pooh" "Stuck Be a Piglet" | Don MacKinnon David Hartman | Dean Stefan Cate Lieuwen | Troy Adomitis Kurt Anderson | November 8, 2008 |
| 34 | 8 | "Piglet's Nutty Problem" "Missing Lumpy" | Don MacKinnon David Hartman | Dean Stefan | Sharon Forward Jay Oliva | December 14, 2008 |
| 35 | 9 | "Darby's Lost and Found" "Piglet's Mystery Pet" | Don MacKinnon David Hartman | Dean Stefan Eileen Cabiling & Erika Grediaga | Wendy Grieb Ken Laramay | December 15, 2008 |
| 36 | 10 | "Piglet's Lost Voice" "Funny Rabbit" | Don MacKinnon David Hartman | Eileen Cabiling & Erika Grediaga Eugene Son | Holly Forsyth Kurt Anderson | January 3, 2009 |
| 37 | 11 | "Tigger's Day at the You-See-Um" "Skunk's Non-Scents" | Don MacKinnon David Hartman | Mark Valenti Dean Stefan | Roy Meurin Robert Griffith | January 31, 2009 |
| 38 | 12 | "It's Eeyore Birthday" "The Tiglet and Pigger Switcher-Roo" | Don MacKinnon David Hartman | Nicole Dubuc Dean Stefan | Eugene Salandra Kurt Anderson | February 14, 2009 |
| 39 | 13 | "Flowers for Eeyore" "Easter Rabbit" | Don MacKinnon David Hartman | Elizabeth Otero Nicole Dubuc | Holly Forsyth Robert Griffin | March 27, 2009 |
| 40 | 14 | "Darby's Wheelie Big Problem" "Turtle Comes Out of His Shell" | David Hartman Don McKinnon | Dean Stefan Nicole Dubuc | Robert Griffith Holly Forsyth | May 11, 2009 |
| 41 | 15 | "Darby's Pony" "Rabbit's Not So-Scary Crow" | David Hartman Don MacKinnon | Dean Stefan Kim Beyer-Johnson | Robert Griffith Holly Forsyth | June 27, 2009 |
| 42 | 16 | "Down Woodpecker's Memory Lane" "Darby's Lost Friend" | Don MacKinnon David Hartman | Eileen Cabiling & Erika Grediaga Brian Hohlfeld | Sharon Forward Jay Oliva | July 11, 2009 |
| 43 | 17 | "Beaver's Taste Buddies" "Too Many Helpings of Tigger" | Don MacKinnon David Hartman | Corey Powell Elizabeth Otero | Troy Adomitis Ken Laramay | July 11, 2009 |
| 44 | 18 | "Darby the Plant Sitter" "Pooh's Nightingale" | David Hartman Don MacKinnon | Ron Holsey Dean Stefan | Jay Oliva Sharon Forward | July 12, 2009 |
| 45 | 19 | "Home for the Holly Days" "Piglet's Found Art" | Don MacKinnon David Hartman | Nicole Dubuc Matt Wayne | Holly Forsyth Robert Griffith | July 12, 2009 |

=== Season 3 (2009–10) ===
| No. overall | No. in season | Title | Directed by | Written by | Storyboarded by | Original release date |
|---|---|---|---|---|---|---|
| 46 | 1 | "Rabbit's Song for a Pumpkin" "Pooh's Blues" | David Hartman Don MacKinnon | Brian Hohlfeld Elizabeth Otero | Ken Laramay Mark Pudleiner | September 8, 2009 |
| 47 | 2 | "Rabbit Gets Squashed" "Topsy Turvy Tigger" | David Hartman Don MacKinnon | Eileen Cabiling & Erika Grediaga Brian Hohlfeld | Kurt Anderson Kirk VanWormer | September 26, 2009 |
| 48 | 3 | "Pooh's Badful Day" "Sleuthin' in the Wind" | David Hartman Don MacKinnon | Kim Beyer-Johnson Eileen Cabiling & Erika Grediaga | Kurt Anderson Eugene Salandra | September 26, 2009 |
| 49 | 4 | "You're a Big Boy, Roo" "Turtle's for the Birds" | Don MacKinnon David Hartman | Dean Stefan | Troy Adomitis Ken Laramay | September 27, 2009 |
| 50 | 5 | "Darby's Prickly Predicament" "Piglet's Monster Under the Bed" | David Hartman Don MacKinnon | Kim Beyer-Johnson Eileen Cabiling & Erika Grediaga | Jay Oliva Sharon Forward | September 27, 2009 |
| 51 | 6 | "Tigger's Invitation Frustration" "Darby's Halloween Case" | Don MacKinnon David Hartman | Eric Shaw Brian Hohlfeld | Troy Adomitis Ken Laramay | October 24, 2009 |
| 52 | 7 | "Tigger Cleans House" "Sleuth Buster" | David Hartman Don MacKinnon | Eileen Cabiling & Erika Grediaga Travis Oates | Jay Oliva Sharon Forward | November 3, 2009 |
| 53 | 8 | "Roo's Pebble in the Pond" "Darby's Super Sleuth Surprise" | David Hartman Don MacKinnon | Brian Hohlfeld Dean Stefan | Kurt Anderson Eugene Salandra | November 17, 2009 |
| 54 | 9 | "Bursting Pooh's Bubble" "Beaver Gets Skunked" | Don MacKinnon David Hartman | Eileen Cabiling & Erika Grediaga Dean Stefan | Troy Adomitis Ken Laramay | December 1, 2009 |
| 55 | 10 | "Porcupine Comes To Her Senses" "Rabbit and Turtle's Re-Run" | Don MacKinnon David Hartman | Eileen Cabiling & Erika Grediaga Nicole Dubuc | Sharon Forward Jay Oliva | December 15, 2009 |
| 56 | 11 | "Piglet's Wish Upon a Star" "Squirrels Will Be Squirrels" | David Hartman Don MacKinnon | Kim Beyer-Johnson Elizabeth Otero | Robert Griffith Holly Forsyth | January 2, 2010 |
| 57 | 12 | "Lumpy's Downhill Battle" "Darby's Squirmy Worms" | Don MacKinnon David Hartman | Kim Beyer-Johnson Dean Stefan | Kirk Van Wormer Kurt Anderson | January 2, 2010 |
| 58 | 13 | "Pooh and Piglet Misplace Their Place" "Eeyore's Dark Cloud" | David Hartman Don MacKinnon | Eileen Cabiling & Erika Grediaga Dean Stefan | Ken Laramay Troy Adomitis | January 3, 2010 |
| 59 | 14 | "Porcupine's Missing Flute" "Darby's Picture Perfect Day" | Don MacKinnon David Hartman | Eileen Cabiling & Erika Grediaga Dean Stefan | Holly Forsyth & Stark Howell Robert Griffith | January 3, 2010 |
| 60 | 15 | "Darby-Saurus" "Darby's Im-Possum-Ible Case" | David Hartman Don MacKinnon | Nicole Dubuc Kim Beyer-Johnson | Jay Oliva Sharon Forward | July 3, 2010 |
| 61 | 16 | "Darby Gets Lemons, Makes Lemonade" "Dancing With Darby" | David Hartman Don MacKinnon | Dean Stefan Nicole Dubuc | Jay Oliva Sharon Forward | October 3, 2010 (Note: This episode was first released in Super Duper Super Sleuths DVD on April 6, 2010.) |
| 62 | 17 | "Tigger A Yo-Yo" "Pooh Loses His Shirt" | Don MacKinnon David Hartman | Dean Stefan Eileen Cabiling & Erika Grediaga | Kirk Van Wormer Kurt Anderson | October 6, 2010 |
| 63 | 18 | "Pooh's Honey Of A Problem" "Darby's Favorite Place" | David Hartman Don MacKinnon | Brian Hohlfeld Eileen Cabiling & Erika Grediaga | Ken Laramay Troy Adomitis | October 9, 2010 |

== Films ==
| No. | Title | Directed by | Written by | Original release date |
|---|---|---|---|---|
| Film–1 | "Super Sleuth Christmas Movie" | Don MacKinnon | Story by : Nicole Dubuc and Brian Hohlfeld; Written by : Nicole Dubuc, Brian Hohlfeld and Jeff Kline; Storyboarded by : Bob Foster, Broni Likomanov, Roy C. Meurin, Jay Oliva and Kirk Van Wormer | December 6, 2008 |
| Film–2 | "Tigger & Pooh and a Musical Too" | David Hartman | Story by : Brian Hohlfeld; Written by : Nicole Dubuc, Brian Hohlfeld and Dean Stefan; Storyboarded by : Kurt Anderson, Sharon Forward, Holly Forsyth, Robert Griffith, Ken Laramay and Jay Oliva | April 11, 2009 |
| Film–3 | "Super Duper Super Sleuths" | Don MacKinnon | Written by : Kim Beyer-Johnson; Storyboarded by : Kurt Anderson, Holly Forsyth, Robert Griffith and Kirk Van Wormer | April 10, 2010 |
