= Tigger & Pooh and a Musical Too =

- DVD cover
- Directed by: Don MacKinnon; David Hartman
- Written by: Dean Stefan; Nicole Dubuc; Brian Hohlfeld
- Produced by: Dorothy McKim
- Starring: Chloë Grace Moretz; Dee Bradley Baker; Jim Cummings
- Edited by: Jhoanne Reyes
- Music by: Andy Sturmer
- Production company: Walt Disney Television Animation
- Distributed by: Walt Disney Studios Home Entertainment
- Release date: April 7, 2009
- Running time: 60 minutes
- Country: United States
- Language: English

Tigger & Pooh and a Musical Too is a 2009 American animated direct-to-video musical film produced by Walt Disney Television Animation, based on the Playhouse Disney television series My Friends Tigger & Pooh. It was released on DVD on April 7, 2009 and first aired on Playhouse Disney on April 11, 2009.

In the film, Darby, Tigger and Pooh organize a musical concert for Hundred Acre Wood. The events of the film take place during the second season of My Friends Tigger & Pooh.

== Plot ==
Rabbit is named the first mayor of the Hundred Acre Wood for his great effort on planning their best friends picnic. Unfortunately, when Darby says that a mayor is in charge of everything, this goes to his head and he makes up a lot of rules, like "No Bouncing," "No Honey," and everything is by a schedule. Everyone gets annoyed by the new rules. Finally, when everyone (especially Tigger) can't follow the rules, Rabbit and Beaver, who becomes the vice-mayor, gives Tigger a break of bouncing, and no honey for Pooh, but it doesn't work making Rabbit upset. Rabbit decides that Tigger can be mayor on his half of the wood, while Rabbit continues being mayor on his side.

He has Beaver paint a white line down the middle of the Hundred Acre Wood and even divides Piglet's house in two. The problem is that the white line separates the people on each side from their friends. Everyone, except Darby and Buster, is to stay on their side which results to problems and chaos. Tigger and Pooh can no longer sleuth, Roo and Lumpy can't visit each other, Tigger can no longer be friends with Roo and Rabbit, and goods, supplies and materials can't be traded (which means no thistles for Eeyore and no cookies made by Kanga). Rabbit sees the sadness and decides to cheer everyone up by having a picnic on his side and Tigger does the same. But the picnics are no fun due to everyone being separated especially trying to sing a song. After a storm hits and everyone feeling overwhelmed and sad for not being able to see each other because of the line, Darby hatches a plan to reunite the Hundred Acre Wood and have everything go back to normal, and it worked. Rabbit and Tigger, having seen the error of their ways, both step down from being mayor and order Beaver to remove the white line, restoring peace to the Hundred Acre Wood.

== Voice cast ==
- Chloë Grace Moretz as Darby
- Dee Bradley Baker as Buster, and Woodpecker
- Jim Cummings as Winnie-the-Pooh, Tigger, and Beaver
- Travis Oates as Piglet
- Peter Cullen as Eeyore
- Ken Sansom as Rabbit
- Kath Soucie as Kanga
- Max Burkholder as Roo
- Oliver Dillon as Lumpy
- Tara Strong as Porcupine
- Mark Hamill as Turtle
- Brenda Blethyn as Mama Heffalump

== Soundtrack ==
The soundtrack was released on April 10, 2009, with 12 songs, three of these being instrumental tracks. As of 2026, the soundtrack is also available on iTunes Store.

1. "One Big Happy Family" (performed by the cast)
2. "A Few Simple Rules" (performed by Rabbit and the cast)
3. "Super Sleuths Theme" (instrumental)
4. "Bouncin" (performed by Tigger and ensemble)
5. "The Grass is Greener" (performed by Tigger and Rabbit)
6. "The Password Song" (performed by Tigger and Beaver)
7. "Underneath the Same Sky" (performed by Pooh with Andy Sturmer)
8. "Think, Think, Think" (instrumental)
9. "The Question Song" (instrumental)
10. "One Big Happy Family" (Reprise) (performed by the cast)
11. "Together Again" (End Credits Theme) (performed by Susanna Benn)
12. "Underneath the Same Sky" (Extended Version) (performed by Kenny Loggins)

== Reception ==
=== Critical response ===
Emily Ashby of Common Sense Media gave Tigger & Pooh and a Musical Too a grade of four out of five stars, praised the depiction of positive messages, citing friendship and accepting others' individuality, and wrote, "And if that's not enough reason to tune in, the seven catchy songs that underscore these messages should do the trick."

=== Sales ===
Year	Film	Number	Gross (US$ sales)	Units (US sales)	Ref.
2009	Tigger & Pooh and a Musical Too	1	$11,616,281		
