= Transformers: EarthSpark =

American animated television series

- Genre: Science fiction comedy; Action
- Based on: Transformers by Hasbro; Takara Tomy
- Developed by: Dale Malinowski; Ant Ward; Nicole Dubuc
- Directed by: Kristi Reed (voice director)
- Voices of: Sydney Mikayla; Zion Broadnax; Kathreen Khavari; Zeno Robinson; Danny Pudi; Benni Latham; Jon Jon Briones
- Composer: Crush Effect
- Countries of origin: Canada (season 1); United States
- Original language: English
- No. of seasons: 4
- No. of episodes: 46

Production
- Executive producers: Ant Ward; Ciro Nieli; Nicole Dubuc; Cort Lane
- Running time: 23–45 minutes
- Production companies: Entertainment One (S1); Hasbro Entertainment (S2–S4); Nickelodeon Animation Studio

Original release
- Network: Paramount+
- Release: November 11, 2022 – December 5, 2025

Transformers: EarthSpark is an American animated action comedy television series based on the Transformers toyline by Hasbro. It was developed by Dale Malinowski, Ant Ward and Nicole Dubuc for the streaming service Paramount+ and sister cable network Nickelodeon. The series is produced by Entertainment One in partnership with Nickelodeon Animation Studio, with animation services provided by Icon Creative Studio.

The first season (consisting of 26 episodes) premiered on November 11, 2022. The second season, produced by Hasbro Entertainment, (consisting of 10 episodes) premiered on June 7, 2024. The third season (consisting of 8 episodes) premiered on October 25, 2024. The fourth and final season, which consisted of two specials, premiered on December 5, 2025.

== Premise ==
Fifteen years after the space bridge to Cybertron is destroyed, ending the civil war between the Autobots and the Decepticons, the Malto family relocates from Philadelphia to the small town of Witwicky, Pennsylvania. There, siblings Robby and Mo Malto witness the birth of a new breed of Earth-born Transformers called Terrans, who become emotionally bonded to the two via special cyber-sleeves on their arms. Now adopted into the family and being mentored by Bumblebee, the Terrans work with the Autobots, the former Decepticon leader Megatron, the organization G.H.O.S.T., and the children to protect their new life from the remaining rogue Decepticons and other villains while finding their place in the world.

Season 2 starts one year later following the defeat of Mandroid. A group of Decepticons led by Starscream goes rogue sometime after the shattering of the Emberstone. It is now up to the Terrans, the Autobots, and the humans to collect the shards before the Decepticons do. This leads to the creation of the Chaos Terrans and the discovery of secrets about Witwicky itself.

Season 3 starts right where Season 2 left off. The stakes get higher when the Quintessons get involved and threaten both the Maltos and Earth.

Season 4 starts right where Season 3 left off. A terrible threat affects the entire universe, with the appearance of a powerful enemy from Cybertron, leading the Terrans, the Autobots and Maltos to their final battle.

== Characters ==
=== Humans ===
- Robby Malto (voiced by Sydney Mikayla in the TV series, Joshua Evans in Expedition) is a 13-year-old boy (14 in Season 2) who gladly adjusted to his new life after being forced to move to a small town.
- Morgan Violet "Mo" Malto (voiced by Zion Broadnax in the TV series, Tunisia Hardison in Expedition) is Robby's optimistic 9-year-old sister (10 in Season 2).
- Dorothy "Dot" Malto (voiced by Benni Latham) is Robby and Mo's mother and Alex's wife, who is a park ranger, ex-soldier and former member of G.H.O.S.T. who lost her lower right leg in the Great Cybertronian War and wears a prosthestic leg.
- Dr. Alex Malto (portrayed by Jon Jon Briones in the TV series, Alex Christian in Expedition) is Robby and Mo's father and Dot's husband who is a college professor with a Ph.D. in Cybertronian History.
- Dr. Meridian / Mandroid (voiced by Diedrich Bader in the TV series, Bill Rogers in Expedition) is a mad scientist and roboticist who seeks to destroy all Cybertronians. His real name is Dr. Meridian and was given the nickname "Mandroid" against his wishes by Thrash. Mandroid had lost his original right arm in the Cybertronian war back when he used to work for G.H.O.S.T. and begins replacing his body parts with those of the Transformers he captures like Hardtop's right arm and Brawl's left arm. Mandroid was later approached by Croft where she allowed him to use one of the G.H.O.S.T. facilities. In "The Last Hope" Pt. 1, Mandroid recruits two Sharkticons to his side and later kills Croft. In "The Last Hope" Pt. 2, Mandroid activated a super-weapon to shut down all Cybertronian lifeforms and died due to the side effect of energon infusion making him vulnerable to the weapon while falsely believing that he won (he readily accepted his timely death and glady moved on afterwards). His victory was short-lived as Robby and Mo Malto used their cyber-sleeves to revive all the Autobots, Decepticons, and Terrans. Mandroid managed to survive as a head where he lies to Olive that the Decepticons have banished Croft to Cybertron. His head gets free and takes control of Starscream up to the pont where his head is removed from Starscream by Megatron. Both Mandroid's head and Starscream are returned to their cells.
  - The Arachnamechs are the spider-like creations of Mandroid.
- Mr. Smelt (voiced by Daran Norris) is a teacher at Witwicky Charter School.
- Fairmaestro (voiced by Richard Ayoade) is a collector of Cybertronian technologies and artifacts, whom he keeps in his tent at the carnival. Though Fairmaestro is defeated by the Maltos, he gets away when Agent Schloder botches his arrest on him. In "The Great Escape", Fairmaestro opens an escape room as part of his revenge on the Maltos. He is defeated when he fails to solve his own escape room.
- Olive Croft (voiced by Ryan Bartley) is the daughter of Karen Croft and niece of Jon Schloder.
- Hoagie (voiced by Jonny Cruz) is a friend of Olive.

==== G.H.O.S.T. ====
Short for Global Hazard Ordinance Strike Team, this human organization originally had the goal of rebuilding the relationship between humans and the Cybertronians. By "The Last Hope" Pt. 2, the organization was disbanded because of Karen Croft's death and Mandroid's evil attitudes.

- Executive Agent Karen Croft (voiced by Kari Wahlgren) is a former high-ranking member of G.H.O.S.T. She is shown to be obsessed with keeping the rogue Decepticons from causing havoc where she even went far as to secretly be behind an illegal Bot Brawl and secretly allow Mandroid to access some of the Decepticon prisoners in one of the G.H.O.S.T. facilities as seen in "Home" Pt. 2. Croft's treachery is revealed in "Stowed Away, Stowaways". Karen is subsequently killed by Mandroid in "The Last Hope" Pt. 1 where he used his super-weapon to disintegrate Croft due to the device he gave her had poisoned her body with Energon.
- Special Agent Jon "No H" Schloder (voiced by Marc Evan Jackson) is a former member of G.H.O.S.T. and the brother of Agent Croft. While he is familiar with some of the Autobots and Megatron, he does get suspicious when it comes to the sighting of the Terran Transformers who are in the Malto family's possession and the fact that Bumblebee faked his death. He eventually figures out about the Terrans and that Bumblebee is still alive and also readily helps them defeat Mandroid. After G.H.O.S.T. was disbanded, Schloder attempted to arrest Fairmaestro only to botch the arrest.
- Agent Bala (voiced by Krizia Bajos) is a former member of G.H.O.S.T.
- Agent Bagheri (voiced by Kathreen Khavari) is a former member of G.H.O.S.T.
- Kwan (voiced by Sherry Cola) is a former G.H.O.S.T. cadet. She is named and modeled after series storyboarder Alex Kwan.
- Conway (voiced by Jason Marsden) is a former G.H.O.S.T. cadet. He is named and modeled after series storyboarder J.J. Conway.
- Rosato (voiced by Kaitlyn Robrock) is a former G.H.O.S.T. cadet. She is named and modeled after series storyboarder Jordan Rosato.

=== Terrans ===
- Twitch Malto (voiced by Kathreen Khavari in the TV series, Farah Rishi in Expedition) is an inquisitive and competitive Terran Transformer and Robby's partner, as well as the leader of the Terrans. She transforms into a flying Cybertronian drone and her weapons are a pair of laser blades.
- Thrash Malto (voiced by Zeno Robinson in the TV series, Chris Long in Expedition) is a fun-loving and impulsive Terran Transformer and Mo's partner. Hs transforms into a motorcycle with a sidecar and his weapons are a shield and a throwing disk.
- Hashtag Malto (voiced by Stephanie Lemelin in the TV series, Lauren Weisman in Expedition) is an excitable media-savvy second-generation Terran Transformer. In the show's first season, she transforms into a G.H.O.S.T. surveillance van. While she does not have a weapon, she makes up for it with the ability to hack into electronic systems via wireless networks. In the show's second season, she upgrades her alt mode to a pickup truck due to her viewing her previous vehicle mode obsolete.
- Jawbreaker Malto (voiced by Cyrus Arnold in the TV series, Bill Rogers in Expedition) is a sensitive second-generation Terran Transformer. He transforms into a Stygimoloch (now referred to as a younger Pachycephalosaurus), which makes him the Dinobot of the group. Though he does not have a weapon, he makes up for it with brute strength and durability.
- Nightshade Malto (voiced by Z Infante in the TV series, Aaron Landon in Expedition) is a creative and scientifically minded second-generation Terran Transformer. Nightshade is the first character in the Transformers franchise to be identified as non-binary, using singular they pronouns. They transform into a Northern hawk-owl and their weapons are a pair of greaves on their forearms that function as blades and dart launchers while also having clawed fingers.
- Aftermath (voiced by Flea of Red Hot Chili Peppers) is a Chaos Terran who was created by a corrupted shard from the Emberstone and can transform into a tow truck. Despite being deactivated at the end of "Witwicky, Part 2”, Aftermath was later reactivated in "Judgment Day, Part 2” to help fight and defeat the Quintessons.
- Spitfire (voiced by Zelda Williams) is a Chaos Terran who was created by a corrupted shard from the Emberstone and shares a strong resemblance to Twitch. Like her, she also transforms into a flying Cybertronian drone. Despite being deactivated at the end of "Witwicky, Part 2”, Spitfire was later reactivated in "Judgment Day, Part 2” to help fight and defeat the Quintessons.
- Terratronus (voiced by Claudia Black) is the first Terran and a Titan who is the progeny of Quintus Prime where she guards his legacy. Her inert body was covered in mounds of soil that later became the site of Witwicky. She helps the Autobots, the Maltos, and the Terrans defeat the Quintessons in the two-part season 3 finale "Judgement Day".

=== Autobots ===
- Optimus Prime (voiced by Alan Tudyk in the TV series, Bill Rogers in Expedition) is the leader of the Autobots who transforms into a semi-trailer truck. He is one of the Cybertronians to be brought back to life by Robby and Mo's cyber-sleeves in the episode, "The Last Hope, Part 2". He helps the Autobots, the Maltos, and Terratronus defeat the Quintessons in the season 3 finale "Judgment Day". He also helps his team win the final battle in the series finale.
- Bumblebee (voiced by Danny Pudi in the TV series, Joe Zieja in Expedition) is a former Autobot scout and current veteran in hiding who becomes the Terrans' mentor and transforms into a yellow sports car with black racing stripes, though it was shown he originally scanned a similarly colored Compact car. He is among the Cybertronians to be restored to life by Robby and Mo Malto's cyber-sleeves in "The Last Hope" Pt. 2. He also helps his team defeat the Quintessons in the two-part season 3 finale "Judgment Day". He also helps assist his team during the series finale to win the final battle.
- Elita-1 (voiced by Cissy Jones) is the Autobots' second-in-command who transforms into an all-terrain SUV. She is one of the Cybertronians to be brought back to life by Robby and Mo Malto's cyber-sleeves in "The Last Hope" Pt. 2. Elita-1 later helps the Autobots, Terratronus, and the Maltos defeat the Quintessons in the two-part season 3 finale, "Judgment Day". She also successfully helps her team win the final battle of the series finale.
- Wheeljack (voiced by Michael T. Downey) is an Autobot mechanic engineer inventor and scientist who transforms into a rally car. Wheeljack was responsible for the drones that were scanned by Twitch, who would later nickname him "Dad 2". He is one of the Cybertronians brought back to life by Robby and Mo's cyber-sleeves. Wheeljack also helps his team defeat the Quintessons in the two-part season 3 finale "Judgment Day". He also helps his team win the final battle during the series finale.
- Arcee (voiced by Martha Marion) is an Autobot soldier who transforms into a muscle car. She is among the Cybertronians to be restored to life by Robby and Mo Malto's cyber-sleeves. Arcee also helps the Autobots, the Maltos, and Terratronus defeat the Quintessons during the season 3 finale "Judgment Day". She also assists her team to win the final battle during the series finale.
- Grimlock (voiced by Keith David in the TV series, Barron Bass in Expedition) is a Dinobot warrior who transforms into a Tyrannosaurus. In the first part of the episode "Home", Grimlock was mind-controlled by Mandroid in fighting in an illegal Bot Brawl. After the Autobots freed Grimlock and ended the illegal Bot Brawl, they found that Grimlock had already left. In "A Stygi Situation" after recovering from the mind-control, Grimlock becomes Jawbreaker's mentor, especially after the Terran becomes a Dinobot and seeks help in controlling his beast mode. Grimlock is also one of the Cybertronians to be restored to life by Robby and Mo Malto's cyber-sleeves in "The Last Hope" Pt. 2. He also helps his team defeat the Quintessons in the season 3 finale "Judgment Day". He also helps assist his team in the final battle of the series finale.
- Cosmos (voiced by "Weird Al" Yankovic) is an Autobot who was kept trapped in his alt mode by Fairmaestro until he was freed by the Maltos and transforms into a flying saucer that served as a carnival ride. He later helps the Autobots, the Maltos and Terratronus defeat the Quintessons in the season 3 finale "Judgment Day". He also helps them win the final battle during the series finale.
- Prowl (voiced by Eric Bauza) is an Autobot soldier who transforms into a police car. He was distrustful of Megatron at first, but readily accepts the fact that Megatron is always willing to help out the Autobots. Prowl also helps the Autobots, the Maltos, and Terratronus defeat the Quintessons in the season 3 finale "Judgment Day" Pt. 2. He also helps his team win the finale battle in the series finale.
- Hot Rod (voiced by Eric Bauza) is an Autobot soldier who was stranded on Cybertron the day when the Space Bridge was destroyed and ended up under the control of Liege Maximo. He would later turn against Liege Maximo during the final battle.
- Mirage (voiced by Troy Baker) is an Autobot spy with holographic projections who was stranded on Cybertron the day when the Space Bridge was destroyed and ended up under the control of Liege Maximo.

=== Decepticons ===
- Megatron (voiced by Rory McCann) is the former leader of the Decepticons and new member of the Autobots who has readily renounced his evil ways to ensure the survival of the Cybertronians by sending the Allspark through the Space Bridge to Cybertron and has occasionally collaborated with Dorothy Malto. This move put Megatron at odds with some of the Decepticons. This incarnation of Megatron transforms into an armored tiltrotor which pays homage to Transformers: Animated. He is among the Cybertronians to be brought back to life by Robby and Mo's cyber-sleeves in "The Last Hope" Pt. 2. Megatron also helps the Maltos, Terratronus, and the Autobots defeat the Quintessons in the two-part season 3 finale, "Judgement Day". He also helps his team win the final battle during the series finale and ends up badly shot by Liege Maximo. The Blades of Time revive Megatron with him regressed back to his hostile wartime self as he escapes. The Autobots roll out to find Megatron as Twitch states that they'll find a way to make him good again.
- Starscream (voiced by Steve Blum) is a Decepticon who transforms into a jet, formerly serving as the faction's Air Commander in the great war. After the war ended, Starscream was seen in the custody of G.H.O.S.T. by the time Soundwave was incarcerated. In "What Dwells Within", Starscream escapes from G.H.O.S.T. custody alongside Skywarp and Nova Storm. After Starscream and Hashtag were saved from the Dweller, Starscream teleported away after Megatron offered him, Skywarp, and Nova Storm a safe place. In "The Last Hope" Pt. 2, Starscream was among the Decepticons who helped the Autobots and the Terrans fight Mandroid. He does try to get revenge on Megatron before Mandroid's super-weapon briefly deactivates him. Starscream is one of the Cybertronians to be revived by Robby and Mo Malto's cyber-sleeves. He later becomes the new leader of the Decepticons in Season 2, though he is secretly using them for his own personal gain. His treachery is revealed to the Decepticons in "Witwicky" Pt. 2 and would later get trapped behind Terratronus' eye until the Season 3 episode "Judgement Day" Pt. 1 where he was taken back into custody for his crimes. Starscream is later taken over by Mandroid's head. He is defeated again by the Maltos and the Autobots during the series finale specials as both Starscream and Mandroid's head are returned to their cells. Blum reprises his role from Transformers: Prime and Robots in Disguise.
- Tarantulas (voiced by Alfie Allen) is a Decepticon scientist who transforms into a tarantula and only appears in the episode "Missed Connection". Residing under a Witwicky cemetery, Tarantulas wants to be left alone and is shown to be caring when it comes to protoforms. He even readily gives Nightshade some advice regarding alt-modes. Tarantulas' appearance in this show is based on his Transmetal form from Beast Wars: Transformers.
- Swindle and Hardtop (both voiced by Nolan North) are a pair of criminal Decepticon brothers who transform into an SUV and a dune buggy, respectively. Swindle was detained and Hardtop's right arm was stolen by Mandroid into a prosthetic replacement for his own. When Mandroid got away after his first fight with the Autobots, Hardtop was among those detained as he claims to Megatron that he was not himself. Swindle would later try to dupe Thrash and Mo into helping find Hardtop by stealing the Energon Scanner only to be repelled by Bumblebee. Hardtop was among those accidentally freed by Hashtag as G.H.O.S.T. worked to contain him and the other escapees. In "Disarmed" and "What Dwells Within", Swindle was detained and placed in G.H.O.S.T. custody where he tried to escape with Starscream, Soundwave, Skywarp, and Nova Storm only to be thwarted by a forcefield barrier. In "The Last Hope", Swindle and Hardtop are among the Decepticons that help the Autobots fight and defeat Mandroid. In "No Soldier Left Behind", Swindle, Hardtop and the rest of Decepticons steal Prowl's ship so they could leave Earth.
- Shrapnel and Bombshell are Insecticons who were in the possession of Mandroid and can transform into a stag beetle and Japanese rhinoceros beetle, respectively. They were later put into G.H.O.S.T. custody after their defeat by the Maltos and the Autobots. In "The Last Hope" Pt. 1, Shrapnel and Bombshell were freed by Nightshade and Twitch where they were uninterested in helping to fight Mandroid. They also leave Earth with the other Decepticons on Prowl's ship in "No Soldier Left Behind".
- Skullcruncher is a Croctobot who was in the possession of Mandroid and can transform into a crocodile. He was later put into G.H.O.S.T. custody after his defeat by the Maltos and Autobots. Skullcruncher was among those accidentally freed by Hashtag as G.H.O.S.T. worked to contain him and the other escapees, but he was defeated by Bumblebee. In "The Last Hope" Pt. 1, Skullcruncher was freed by Nightshade and Twitch and left where he was unwilling to help fight Mandroid. In the episode "No Soldier Left Behind", Skullcruncher and the other Decepticons leave the Earth aboard Prowl's ship.
- Soundwave (voiced by Sean Kenin) is a Decepticon who works with his cassette-bots minions, transforms into a stealth Cybertronian aircraft and has a particular grudge against Megatron, falsely believing he has abandoned the Decepticons. Soundwave was among those that were accidentally freed by Hashtag as G.H.O.S.T. worked to contain him and the other escapees. In "What Dwells Within," Soundwave tried to escape with Starscream, Skywarp, and Nova Storm only to be thwarted by a forcefield barrier. In "The Last Hope", Soundwave was among the Decepticons that help the Autobots and the Terrans fight and defeat Mandroid. He and his mini-cassette bots also leave Earth with the other Decepticons on Prowl's ship in "No Soldier Left Behind".
  - Ravage is one of Soundwave's mini-cassette minions, taking on a jaguar-like robot mode.
  - Laserbeak (voiced by Jake Green) is one of Soundwave's mini-cassette minions, taking on a bird-like robot mode.
  - Frenzy (voiced by Tiana Camacho) is one of Soundwave's mini-cassette minions and the only one with a traditionally humanoid robot mode.
- Skywarp and Nova Storm (both voiced by Nicole Dubuc in the TV series, Alex Cazares in Expedition) are a pair of female Decepticon Seekers who were forced to work for Mandroid prior to the human villain's death and both transform into jets, with Skywarp being able to teleport. Nova Storm wanted to be an Autobot, but Skywarp talked her out of it. In "What Dwells Within," Skywarp and Nova Storm escape from G.H.O.S.T. custody with Starscream. In "The Last Hope" Pt. 2, Skywarp and Nova Storm are among the Decepticons that help the Autobots and the Terrans fight Mandroid. In "No Soldier Left Behind", they and the other Decepticons steal Prowl's ship to leave Earth.
- Breakdown (voiced by Roger Craig Smith) is a Stunticon who is one of a few Decepticons to renounce his evil ways and is close friends with Bumblebee. He transforms into a race car and ended up in GHOST custody as of "Security Protocols" as he sacrifices himself to save Bumblebee. In "The Last Hope", Breakdown is among the Decepticons that help the Autobots and the Terrans fight Mandroid. Breakdown also leaves Earth with the other Decepticons on Prowl's ship in "No Soldier Left Behind".
- Shockwave (also voiced by Troy Baker) is the Decepticons' former chief scientist who has a vendetta against Megatron ever since he readily sided with the Autobots in keeping the Allspark safe and trapping him in stasis. He transforms into a Cybertronian four-legged walking tank and has referred to the Terrans as "Cybrids". In "The Last Hope", Shockwave was briefly drained of his Energon by Mandroid. He was among the Cybertronians that were revived by the cyber-sleeves of Robby and Mo. He and the other Decepticons leave Earth on Prowl's ship in "No Soldier Left Behind".
- Brawl is a Decepticon who only appears in the two-part episode "Home" in which he was forced to fight in an illegal Bot Brawl. He was later found dead after having been drained of his Energon alongside the other generic Cybertronians. This was caused by Mandroid who later took his left arm.
- Scorponok (voiced by Roger Craig Smith) is a giant Decepticon who can transform into a mechanical scorpion. He was stranded on Cybertron the day when the Space Bridge was destroyed.
- Octopunch is a Decepticon. He was stranded on Cybertron the day when the Space Bridge was destroyed.

=== Quintessons ===
- The Quintesson Judge (voiced by Betsy Sodaro) is the five-faced leader of the Quintessons who wish to take Quintus Prime's power from Robby and Mo. They are defeated by Terratronus, the Maltos and the Autobots in the two-part episode "Judgement Day".
- The Quintesson Executioners (voiced by Fred Tatasciore) are the soldiers of the Quintessons. One Quintesson Executioner has a bad history with Quintus Prime. They are defeated by Terratronus, the Maltos, and the Autobots in the two-part episode "Judgement Day".
- "Isabel/Izzy" (voiced by Siena Agudong) is a girl that Robby befriends at a carnival. It turns out they have a lot in common and he has a crush on her which she repricocates. However, Izzy is soon revealed to be a shape-shifting Quintesson spy in season 3 and shows no remorse in hurting Robby's friends and the Autobots. She is eventually defeated by the Maltos and the Autobots.

=== Sharkticons ===
The Sharkticons are a race of shark-like Cybertronian beings from another planet that were oppressed by the Quintessons until Mandroid liberated it. Some Sharkticons remain on board the Quintesson ship to eat those who are guilty.

- Blitzwave (voiced by Nolan North) is a Sharkticon recruited by Mandroid in the two-part season one finale. Despite the fact that Blitzwave was deactivated by Mandroid's super-weapon, he was among those revived by Robby and Mo's cyber-sleeves.
- Razor-Fin (voiced by Steve Blum) is a Sharkticon recruited by Mandroid in the two-part season one finale. Despite the fact that Razor-Fin was deactivated by Mandroid's super-weapon, he was among those revived by Robby and Mo's cyber-sleeves.

=== Other ===
- Liege Maximo (voiced by Nolan North) is one of the original Thirteen Primes created by Primus. He is defeated by the Maltos and the Autobots in the series finale.
- Quintus Prime (voiced by Clancy Brown) is an ancient Cybertronian and one of the original Thirteen Primes created by Primus who served as the scientist of the group. His artifact the Emberstone is responsible for bringing the Terrans (and the Quintessons) into existence as he is shown to speak through it. Following the events of the episodes "Disarmed" and "What Dwells Within", Quintus Prime readily helps the Maltos to restore Robby's health and repair his cyber-sleeve in the episode "Prime Time", and he also gladly helps Robby and Mo use their cyber-sleeves to restore all the Autobots, Decepticons, and Terrans to life following the defeat and death of Mandroid in "The Last Hope, Part 2".
- V.A.L. (voiced by Cissy Jones) is an A.I. who is part of Hashtag's new upgrade. Her name is short for Virtual Assistant Liaison.

== Episodes ==
Season	Episodes		Originally released
1	26	10	November 11, 2022
1	26	8	March 3, 2023
1	26	8	July 28, 2023
2	10		June 7, 2024
3	8		October 25, 2024
4	2		December 5, 2025

=== Season 1 (2022–23) ===
No. overall	No. in season	Title	Directed by	Written by	Storyboarded by	Original release date	Nickelodeon air date	Prod. code	U.S. linear viewers (millions)
1	1	"Secret Legacy"	Alex Kwan & Jordan Rosato	Nicole Dubuc & Dale Malinowski	Aaron Brewer, Alex Nyerges, Carl Peterson, Nathan Jones, Marvin Madrid Rodriguez & Sol Choi	November 11, 2022	November 11, 2022	101-102	0.20
2	2	"Secret Legacy"	Alex Kwan & Jordan Rosato	Nicole Dubuc & Dale Malinowski	Aaron Brewer, Alex Nyerges, Carl Peterson, Nathan Jones, Marvin Madrid Rodriguez & Sol Choi	November 11, 2022	November 11, 2022	101-102	0.20
The Malto family recently moves into Witwicky, though when Robby attempts to run away for Philadelphia, the first Transformers born on planet Earth become involved in both family drama and the start of a new conflict when they run into the mysterious Mandroid who has made use of his Arachnamechs and some Decepticons.
3	3	"Moo-ving In"	J.J. Conway	Isabel Galupo	India Swift, Meg Lloyd, Milo Gould & Veronica Liu	November 11, 2022	February 10, 2023	103	0.12
As Bumblebee moves in with the Maltos to train the Terrans, he quickly discovers that the task at hand is far more difficult than what he had originally expected. He then gets few lessons by other Autobots, which include trying to scare them so they listen (from Megatron) and do what makes them happy (by Elita-1).
4	4	"House Rules"	Jordan Rosato	Ian Busch	Carl Peterson, Marvin Madrid Rodriguez & Sol Choi	November 11, 2022	February 10, 2023	104	N/A
A number of incidents involving Mo and Thrash results in the pair being tricked by Swindle as he tries to find and rescue Hardtop while targeting an Energon Scanner, but the family's previous relation strains quickly comes under fire.
5	5	"Classified"	Alex Kwan	Nathan Ramos-Park	Aaron Brewer & Nathan Jones	November 11, 2022	February 17, 2023	105	0.18
A series of nightmares from Robby results in the entire family getting involved in a number of situations involving G.H.O.S.T. including keeping the Terrans safe from their triggerhappy agents led by Agent Schloder. Upon finding out, Optimus Prime works to hide Robby, Mo, Twitch, and Thrash while Bumblebee helps Alex to stall Agent Schloder.
6	6	"Traditions"	Jordan Rosato & Matthew Humphreys	Maasai Singleton	Carl Peterson, Marvin Madrid Rodriguez, Sol Choi & Stephanie Ressler	November 11, 2022	February 17, 2023	106	0.15
During the day of a family tradition that involve hunting for a vampire bird called the Wakwak, Twitch discovers Wheeljack while looking for Alex as Wheeljack learns that Twitch scanned one of his drones. Though they and Robby quickly get ambushed by the Arachnamechs sent by Mandroid to find more Cybertronians as he finds difficulty operating a laser with Hardtop's arm.
7	7	"Friends and Family"	J.J. Conway	Brian Hohlfeld	David Maximo, Kevin Reed, Milo Gould, Stephanie Ressler, Veronica Liu & Zheping Xu	November 11, 2022	February 24, 2023	107	0.16
It is the first day of school for Robby and Mo and they are nervous about it and so are Thrash and Twitch, whom fear that they might get replaced by new friends. After a falling out, more similarities between Humans and Terrans are revealed.
8	8	"Decoy"	Alex Kwan	Isabel Galupo	Aaron Brewer, Alex Nyerges, Michael Nanna, Nathan Jones & Rachel Buecheler	November 11, 2022	February 24, 2023	108	0.14
While Optimus and Megatron argue about the current situation regarding the treatment of former Decepticons, Bumblebee pawns off his duties to Arcee so he can get back in the field - a decision he finds to be a very bad idea when Soundwave releases Ravage into a G.H.O.S.T. facility where some Decepticon inmates are imprisoned.
9	9	"Age of Evolution"	J.J. Conway	Nicole Dubuc & Dale Malinowski	Anissa Espinosa, India Swift, Kevin Molina-Ortiz, Meg Lloyd, Milo Gould & Veronica Liu	November 11, 2022	March 3, 2023	109-110	0.16
10	10	"Age of Evolution"	J.J. Conway	Nicole Dubuc & Dale Malinowski	Anissa Espinosa, India Swift, Kevin Molina-Ortiz, Meg Lloyd, Milo Gould & Veronica Liu	November 11, 2022	March 3, 2023	109-110	0.16
The Autobots and the Maltos begin to search for the origin of the Terrans, but Mandroid sends Skywarp and Nova Storm to target Optimus Prime's left arm. This causes a hostage situation and a rescue operation is in effect - with reinforcements.
11	11	"Hashtag: Oops"	Matthew Humphreys	Bernard Badion	Kalvin Lee, Marvin Madrid Rodriguez, Byron Penaranda, Carl Peterson & Sam Syszmanski	March 3, 2023	June 12, 2023	111	0.22
Bumblebee charges Twitch and Thrash to help the new Terrans find alt modes. After Twitch convinces Hashtag to pick one, the latter chooses a G.H.O.S.T. van and inadvertently causes mischief in their headquarters where Hashtag accidentally frees Soundwave, Hardtop, Bombshell, Shrapnel, and Skullcruncher from their cells. Meanwhile, Nightshade is preparing a surprise for the family.
12	12	"Outtakes"	Alexandria Kwan	Maasai Singleton	Aaron Brewer, Nathan Jones & Alex Nyerges	March 3, 2023	June 13, 2023	112	0.15
Jawbreaker is struggling to find an alt mode for himself. Hashtag tries to help him by interviewing other Transformers like Bumblebee, Megatron, and Elita-1 and making a film out of it. he learns about the T-Cog that enables Cybertronians to transform into their alt-modes. Things go wrong when Alex's camera gets snatched by a reactivated Arachnamech and now they must stop it before the footage is revealed.
13	13	"Missed Connection"	Matthew Humphreys	Mae Catt	Rachel Buecheler, Marvin Madrid Rodriguez, Carl Peterson, Stephanie Ressler & Samuel Syszmanski	March 3, 2023	June 14, 2023	113	N/A
Nightshade has trouble communicating with the family when Robby and Malto have a day off from school as Nightshade works to make a Smart Trainer. After meeting the lone Decepticon scientist Tarantulas beneath a Witwicky cemetery, they bond over their mutual passion for science and later the fact that both are hiding from G.H.O.S.T. while also getting advice on picking alt modes.
14	14	"Security Protocols"	J.J. Conway	Lorin Williams	Julia Braid, Jules Bridgers, Milo Gould, Karen Guo, Veronica Liu, Kevin Molina-Ortiz, Ifesinachi Orjiekwe & Nas Pasha	March 3, 2023	June 15, 2023	114	0.15
G.H.O.S.T. has been doing some Cybertronian hunting at the Witwicky Raceway as Bumblebee trains for the Witwicky 500 in order to find his old Decepticon friend, Breakdown. Agent Schloder is suspicious that Bumblebee didn't get lost during the war when he visits the Maltos as Robby, Mo, and the Terrans get trapped in their hideout's lockdown mode for ten hours. G.H.O.S.T. discovers Bumblebee who manages to escape thanks to Breakdown, but leaves the Maltos in order to keep them safe.
15	15	"Bear Necessities"	Alex Kwan	Isabel Galupo	Aaron Brewer, Nathan Jones & Alex Nyerges	March 3, 2023	August 19, 2023	115	0.16
On Mother's Day, the Malto family throw a party for Dot. Twitch's misunderstanding of getting a gift for Dot causes the Malto family mishaps involving an American black bear cub when she mistakes it for a teddy bear which Robby listed as one of the suggestions. When Dot, Robby, and Twitch go to return the bear cub, its mother shows up at the Malto farm to look for its cub while the others are working on a special play for Dot. Dot, Robby, and Twitch discover a toxic threat to nature when they find discarded G.H.O.S.T. items that end up mutating the mother bear upon eating the infected larva.
16	16	"Warzone"	Matthew Humphreys	Greg Johnson	Matthew Kim, Marvin Madrid Rodriguez, Carl Peterson & Stephanie Ressler	March 3, 2023	August 19, 2023	116	0.13
Megatron takes Robby, Mo, and the Terrans into the Space Bridge Memorial Park where the Transformers war ended and contains the memorial wall for those who perished. He explains that if the Allspark, and by extension Cybertron, is lost in the Space Bridge explosion. In addition, Megatron states the Terrans are their race's hope for the future and must not repeat their mistakes. The Decepticon's mad scientist Shockwave, who was put into stasis by Megatron at the end of the war, reawakens and plans his revenge on Megatron while his special laser called the Immobilizer on the Terrans.
17	17	"Home"	J.J. Conway & Alex Kwan & Sebastian Montes	Teleplay by : Mae Catt, Nicole Dubuc & Dale Malinowski; Story by : Mae Catt, Nicole Dubuc, Isabel Galupo, Dale Malinowski & Maasai Singleton	Aaron Brewer, Milo Gould, Nathan Jones, Veronica Liu, Kevin Molina-Ortiz, Alex Nyerges & India Swift	March 3, 2023	August 26, 2023	117-118	0.08
18	18	"Home"	J.J. Conway & Alex Kwan & Sebastian Montes	Teleplay by : Mae Catt, Nicole Dubuc & Dale Malinowski; Story by : Mae Catt, Nicole Dubuc, Isabel Galupo, Dale Malinowski & Maasai Singleton	Aaron Brewer, Milo Gould, Nathan Jones, Veronica Liu, Kevin Molina-Ortiz, Alex Nyerges & India Swift	March 3, 2023	August 26, 2023	117-118	0.08
Bumblebee participates in the underground Bot Brawl on a mission to find Grimlock, unaware that it is hosted by Mandroid who is looking for more Cybertronian parts and energon for himself. The Malto siblings decide to have nighttime stroll at the city where they realize that the transformers are not welcome on Earth by everyone and later accidentally become involved in Bumblebee's mission and their familial bond is tested when the madman brainwashes Hashtag with his recent project. Luckily, the Maltos and their Terran siblings use the energy from the Terran's birthplace cave to rescue Hashtag from Mandroid's mind control. The Maltos and Terrans carry an exhausted Bumblebee back to Witwicky, and Mandroid meets up with G.H.O.S.T., making an alliance.
19	19	"A Stygi Situation"	Matthew Humphreys	Isabel Galupo	Marvin Madrid Rodriguez, Carl Peterson & Stephanie Ressler	July 28, 2023	April 6, 2024	119	N/A
With Grimlock back on the Autobots' side, Jawbreaker is eager to learn how to fight from the Dinobot, but his questions and comments end up sparking some unpleasant memories from the bot brawls.
20	20	"Disarmed"	Matthew Humphreys	Maasai Singleton	James Nguyen, Florent LaGrange & Steve Go	July 28, 2023	April 6, 2024	120	N/A
The Autobots and Maltos seek to expand upon the powers of the Cyber-Sleeves after Swindle is detained in his latest attempt to spring Hardtop from his imprisonment. When Mandroid begins eavesdropping, the group discovers that their training sessions have just become a fight for survival. They mangage to win the battle against Mandroid, but Robby gets injured and his cyber-sleeve gets damaged.
21	21	"What Dwells Within"	Sebastian Montes & Alex Kwan	Mae Catt	Aaron Brewer, Nathan Jones & Alex Nyerges	July 28, 2023	April 13, 2024	121	0.09
A series of coincidences leaves Robby, Mo and the Terrans trapped underground with the Seekers when the Maltos are trying to use the cave water to repair Robby and Mo's cyber-sleeves, though Starscream is constantly irked by their positive view of Megatron at the time when he, Skywarp, Nova Storm, and Soundwave plan their escape. This leads to an encounter with a spacefaring Energon-eating creature called the Dweller. The Maltos and the Seekers defeat and destroy the Dweller with cave water, but Robby reveals that he has some a strange infection spreading through his body.
22	22	"Prime Time"	J.J. Conway	Isabel Galupo	Milo Gould & India Swift	July 28, 2023	April 13, 2024	122	0.06
Robby's worsening condition from the infection in his body causes Mo to break down in fear for his health, but Mandroid's possession of the Emberstone end up putting the entire family in jeopardy. Luckily, Quintus Prime readily helps the Maltos defeat Mandroid and use the Emberstone to successfully restore Robby's health along with repairing the cyber-sleeves.
23	23	"Stowed Away, Stowaways"	Matthew Humphreys	Gavin Hignight	Marvin Madrid Rodriguez, Carl Peterson & Stephanie Ressler	July 28, 2023	April 20, 2024	123	0.08
The Terrans give Bumblebee some secret assistance as he goes to infiltrate G.H.O.S.T. HQ, but everyone discovers that the organization harbors some dark secrets.
24	24	"The Battle of Witwicky"	Sebastian Montes & Alex Kwan	Mae Catt	Aaron Brewer, Nathan Jones & Alex Nyerges	July 28, 2023	April 20, 2024	124	0.08
Agent Croft's true colors are revealed after Bumblebee's failed mission, and every Cybertronian available is quick to come to the rescue when she attacks the Malto farm.
25	25	"The Last Hope"	Matthew Humphreys & J.J. Conway	Dale Malinowski	Marvin Madrid Rodriguez, Carl Peterson, Stephanie Ressler, Milo Gould, India Swift, Veronica Liu & Kevin Molina-Ortiz	July 28, 2023	April 20, 2024	125-126	0.09
26	26	"The Last Hope"	Matthew Humphreys & J.J. Conway	Dale Malinowski	Marvin Madrid Rodriguez, Carl Peterson, Stephanie Ressler, Milo Gould, India Swift, Veronica Liu & Kevin Molina-Ortiz	July 28, 2023	April 20, 2024	125-126	0.09
The Maltos and Terrans begin the fight of a lifetime to rescue their family when Mandroid begins his final plan to eliminate all Cybertronians on Earth. After a lot of battles, Mandroid shuts down all Cybertronian lifeforms, killing himself in the process. Fortunately, Robby and Mo use their cyber-sleeves to restore all the Autobots, Decepticons, and Terrans to life.

=== Season 2 (2024) ===
No. overall	No. in season	Title	Directed by	Written by	Storyboarded by	Original release date	Nickelodeon air date	Prod. code	U.S. linear viewers (millions)
27	1	"Aftermath"	Sheldon Vella	Dale Malinowski	Kevin Molina-Ortiz, Christopher Luc & Alan Wan	June 7, 2024	September 28, 2024	201	N/A
One year after the defeat and death of Mandroid, the Autobots and the Decepticons work together to locate the scattered shards of the Emberstone, but the latter under Starscream's command betray them and seek the shards for their conquest. A fight over a shard causes the creation of a new Terran (dubbed Chaos Terran by the Maltos) named Aftermath who joins the Decepticons. Robby hatches a plan to lure the Decepticons away from their base and take their shards, but it fails and they are forced to retreat.
28	2	"In Ruins"	William Ruzicka	Ian Busch	Cheska Anilao, Craig Yamamoto, Veronica Liu & J.J. Conway	June 7, 2024	October 5, 2024	202	N/A
Mo and Thrash come across a ruin where a Quintesson executioner lies. After awakening him, the executioner seeks to capture Mo and have her stand trial for what the Quintessons falsely believe are Quintus' crime against them.
29	3	"Control Alt Delete"	Vinton T. Heuck	Gavin Hignight	Eric Meister, Milo Gould, Josh McKenzie & Adam Van Wyk	June 7, 2024	October 12, 2024	203	0.08
Hashtag readily agrees to find a new alt.mode after hearing the G.H.O.S.T. vehicles are being repurposed; with the help of her new upgrade V.A.L (Virtual Assistant Liaison) she manages to find the new alt.mode of a pickup truck while trying to keep a data file belonging to Croft from Shockwave's reach.
30	4	"The Butterfly Effect"	William Ruzicka & Scooter Tidwell	Jen Bardekoff	Cheska Anilao, Richard Chi, Lillian Fiedler & Craig Yamamoto	June 7, 2024	October 19, 2024	204	0.06
Robby, Mo, Twitch and Thrash go into an amusement park and find an Emberstone shard in the possession of an evil collector called Fairmaestro who also has the Autobot Cosmos as prisoner. Robby also meets a girl named Isabel and falls in love with her.
31	5	"Togetherness"	Vinton T. Heuck	Matt Wayne	Josh McKenzie, Eric Meister & Adam Van Wyk	June 7, 2024	October 26, 2024	205	N/A
While the Maltos try to find the secret behind Twitch and Thrash combining, Jawbreaker comes across Aftermath who requires nutrition. The two of them combine as well and after dealing with mutant mushrooms come across some cave water. The Maltos' reserve runs out due to combining taking energy and they realize Aftermath took it all.
32	6	"Spitfire"	Sheldon Vella	Halima Lucas	Kevin Molina-Ortiz, Christopher Luc & Richard Chi	June 7, 2024	January 18, 2025	206	0.07
Twitch and Wheeljack are testing new drones when they discover a new shard where a scuffle with Soundwave results in the creation of a new Chaos Terran named Spitfire who, despite having a striking resemblance to Twitch, turns out to be the exact opposite.
33	7	"The Imposters"	William Ruzicka & Scooter Tidwell	Ian Busch	Cheska Anilao, Michael Borkowski, Christian Gossett Vilá & Lillian Fiedler	June 7, 2024	January 18, 2025	207	0.04
After lightning strikes them during their fight, Twitch and Spitfire swap bodies. Twitch is taken by Aftermath to the Decepticons where she learns they intend to take Mandroid's cyber slayer and tries to warn the Autobots while Spitfire wishes to take it for herself.
34	8	"Dude Where's My Trailer"	Scooter Tidwell	Russ Carney & Ron Corcillo	Cheska Anilao, Michael Borkowski & Christian Gossett Vilá	June 7, 2024	January 25, 2025	208	0.08
Robby and Hashtag take Optimus's trailer for a car wash to prepare it for a trailer photo shoot, but it is stolen and damaged by the Decepticons multiple times.
35	9	"Witwicky"	Vinton T. Heuck & Sheldon Vella	Dale Malinowski, Amy Wolfram & Matt Wayne	Eric Meister, Josh McKenzie, Samuel Montes, Kevin Molina-Ortiz, Christopher Luc, Richard Chi & J.J. Conway	June 7, 2024	February 1, 2025	209-210	0.06
36	10	"Witwicky"	Vinton T. Heuck & Sheldon Vella	Dale Malinowski, Amy Wolfram & Matt Wayne	Eric Meister, Josh McKenzie, Samuel Montes, Kevin Molina-Ortiz, Christopher Luc, Richard Chi & J.J. Conway	June 7, 2024	February 1, 2025	209-210	0.06
While the family is celebrating the finding of all of the Emberstone shards, Mo is forced to finish her school project and along with Hashtag learns a big secret about Witwicky and more about the origin of the Emberstone. Meanwhile, Starscream is preparing to put his plan in motion.

=== Season 3 (2024) ===
No. overall	No. in season	Title	Directed by	Written by	Storyboarded by	Original release date	Nicktoons air date	Prod. code	U.S. linear viewers (millions)
37	1	"The Need for Read"	Vinton T. Heuck	Dale Malinowski	Eric Meister, Josh McKenzie & Samuel Montes	October 25, 2024	November 9, 2025	211	N/A
Bumblebee tries to save Breakdown from the barrier containing the Decepticons and Terratronus and seizes the opportunity when Mo and Thrash decide to go in it and retrieve the final issue of a comic for Robby inside the dome. He convinces the Maltos that Breakdown is friend but before they manage to leave, they are intercepted by the Decepticons led by Shockwave who were informed by Breakdown. They decide to have a race, if Bumblebee wins they leave with the comic and if Breakdown wins they take the Decepticons with them.
38	2	"Attack of the Drive-In Movie"	Sheldon Vella	Ian Busch	Kevin Molina-Ortiz, Christopher Luc & Richard Chi	October 25, 2024	November 16, 2025	212	N/A
For Robby and Izzy's date, the Malto family sets up a drive-in theater with a horror movie. the movie night turns out more exciting than expected when the movie's creatures become real.
39	3	"The Great Escape"	Scooter Tidwell	Jen Bardekoff	Cheska Anilao, Michael Borkowski & Christian Gossett Vilá	October 25, 2024	November 23, 2025	213	N/A
Fairmaestro returns to get revenge on the Maltos by challenging them to complete an escape room he has rigged for them to lose within an hour and threatens to turn the Terrans into his new ride if they fail. Luckily, Twitch Malto rescues her family by destroying the tickets and to pay Fairmaestro back for his evil sins, she offers to be a fairground ride if Fairmaestro could finish the challenges himself; Fairmaestro readily agrees, but runs afoul and is defeated in the first challenge.
40	4	"No Soldier Left Behind"	Vinton T. Heuck	Marty Isenberg	Eric Meister, Samuel Montes & Josh McKenzie	October 25, 2024	November 30, 2025	214	N/A
An Autobot ship crashes inside the barrier, so Optimus, Megatron, and the Maltos arrive to investigate, and discover Optimus' old friend Prowl, who has come on a quest to protect a valuable object. The heroes are able to protect the valuable object, but the Decepticons steal Prowl's ship and leave Earth.
41	5	"Fire and Ice"	Sheldon Vella	Aiko Hilkinger	Kevin Molina-Ortiz, Christopher Luc, Richard Chi, Veronica Liu & Sol Choi	October 25, 2024	December 7, 2025	215	N/A
After the Maltos go outside to play in the snow, Bumblebee arrives in an aggressive manner and infects the Autobots with a strange rage virus. Only Twitch is the only one who can save the day. Luckily, Twitch and her family use a liquid coolant gas to cure the Autobots for good.
42	6	"The Truth Is Out There"	Scooter Tidwell	Ian Busch	Cheska Anilao, Michael Borkowski & Christian Gossett Vilá	October 25, 2024	December 14, 2025	216	N/A
Robby, Thrash and Prowl investigate what caused the Rage Virus to infect Bumblebee. Analyzing some suspects, the team also discovers a shape-shifting Quintesson spy, who came to Earth. Faced with this terrible truth, the team discovers that Izzy was actually the spy Quintesson, who was the one who infected Bumblebee with the virus and her mission was to get Robby and Mo's manga. While imprisoned, Izzy says that this is only the beginning.
43	7	"Judgment Day"	Vinton T. Heuck & Sheldon Vella	Dale Malinowski	Eric Meister, Josh McKenzie, Samuel Montes, Richard Chi, Kevin Molina-Ortiz, Christopher Luc & Alexandra Nyerges	October 25, 2024	December 21, 2025	217-218	N/A
44	8	"Judgment Day"	Vinton T. Heuck & Sheldon Vella	Dale Malinowski	Eric Meister, Josh McKenzie, Samuel Montes, Richard Chi, Kevin Molina-Ortiz, Christopher Luc & Alexandra Nyerges	October 25, 2024	December 21, 2025	217-218	N/A
On the worst day of Robby's life, he and Mo must fight for their lives against a new Invader falsely claiming to be the rightful heir to the power of Quintus Prime. To protect Earth from the ruthless invaders, the Maltos and the Autobots must seek help and put their trust in unexpected allies. With their combined powers, the Autobots, Terratronus, the Terrans and the Maltos defeat the Quintessons for good so that the Quintessons will never harm anybody or anything on the planet Earth anymore.

=== Season 4 (2025) ===
No. overall	No. in season	Title	Directed by	Written by	Storyboarded by	Original release date	Nicktoons air date	Prod. code	U.S. linear viewers (millions)
45	1	"Hometown Heroes"	Vinton T. Heuck & Scooter Tidwell	Ian Busch & Greg Weisman	Cheska Anilao, Gene Goldstein, Morgan Hillebrand, Kai Lynn Jiang, Max Lawson & Rwoyu Wen	December 5, 2025	April 4, 2026	221-222	N/A
Every victory comes at a price, and the Maltos will face the consequences. Robby "abuses" his powers because of two bullies named Olive and Hoagie, but Mo and Thrash successfully prove his innocence. Meanwhile, Twitch becomes their worst enemy, and the Autobots face Mandroid again, this time with Hot Rod's help....or is it because he's searching for something valuable?
46	2	"Legacy of Hope"	Abe Audish, Vinton T. Heuck & Scooter Tidwell	Ian Busch, Dale Malinowski & Greg Weisman	Cheska Anilao, Andy Cung, Gene Goldstein, Morgan Hillebrand, Kai Lynn Jiang, Christopher Jones, George Kaprielian, Max Lawson & Rwoyu Wen	December 5, 2025	April 11, 2026	223, 224, 225	N/A
The Maltos and Autobots search for their missing allies upon arriving on Cybertron. Thrash helps his sister Twitch lead the mission, while Robby and Mo search for the traitor Hot Rod and make a new friend, Mirage. Optimus faces an old enemy named Liege Maximo, a former Prime, who wants to recreate Cybertron as his seat of power and transform other planets into sources of Energon. With each Malto and Autobot in defeat, Twitch is the only one it depends on to lead the team to victory, until the whole truth is revealed. Luckily, the Maltos and the Autobots successfully defeat Liege Maximo for good so that he will never harm anybody or anything in the universe anymore.

== Production ==
In February 2021, Hasbro announced two animated series based on the Transformers brand. The first was a series based on the BotBots line for Netflix, and the other was a then-untitled series set to air on Nickelodeon in 2022. The animated series' official title, Transformers: EarthSpark, was revealed one year later with a release window set for the fourth quarter of 2022. In March 2022, it was announced that the series would debut on the Paramount+ streaming service in November 2022. The voice cast and a preview for the series was later revealed during the 2022 San Diego Comic-Con. Owned and distributed by Hasbro, the series is a co-production between Nickelodeon Animation Studio and Entertainment One (later Hasbro Entertainment). The former's Conrad Montgomery and the latter's Kari Rosenberg and Mikiel Houser, oversaw production on behalf of both companies. It was executive-produced by Ant Ward and Nicole Dubuc, and co-executive-produced by developer Dale Malinowski. Claudia Spinelli of Nickelodeon developed the series for television.

=== Release ===
The first season consists of twenty-six episodes, the first ten of which debuted on Paramount+ in the U.S. on November 11, 2022. The second batch of the season one episodes began streaming on March 3, 2023, bringing the total episode count to eighteen. The remaining episodes of season 1 were released on July 28, 2023. In February 2023, the series was renewed for a second season, which premiered on June 7, 2024. The series was licensed to Netflix internationally in June 2023. The first ten episodes were released on DVD on May 16, 2023, by Paramount Home Entertainment. The rest of the sixteen episodes was released on DVD on February 13, 2024.

== Video game ==
An action-adventure game developed by Tessera Studios, titled Transformers: EarthSpark – Expedition, was revealed in June 2023 by its publisher Outright Games. The game received a North and South American release on October 13, 2023, for the Nintendo Switch, PlayStation 4, PlayStation 5, Windows via Steam, Xbox One, Xbox Series X and Series S. A single-player video game, the player controls Bumblebee and can explore three biomes in a three-dimensional environment with the goal of defeating the evil Mandroid. Bumblebee uses physical attacks and attack combos to defeat enemies and enhance his skills.

== Reception ==
=== Controversy ===
In May 2023, the character Nightshade and their designation as non-binary received backlash. The controversy arose on X, on which the account Libs of TikTok shared a clip from the episode "Home" which showed Nightshade talking to a human character named Sam (voiced by Alisha Mullally), who uses she/they pronouns. During the conversation, Sam addressed Nightshade as "non-binary", leading to Nightshade's confusion as they didn't know the term. Sam apologized and explained that non-binary people identify as neither male nor female, to which Nightshade expressed gratitude and excitement on learning a word that accurately describes their experience.

Several commentators, such as Megyn Kelly derided the series for the show's LGBT message. Laura Ingraham likewise panned the show on The Ingraham Angle for teaching children about being non-binary and because she thought incredibly ham-fisted and forced. In Japan, there was controversy surrounding Nightshade being referred to as a female in their debut, though later episodes of the dub do refer to Nightshade as nonbinary. The scene with Nightshade explaining their gender was later edited out of the BBC airing of the episode.

=== Accolades ===
Year	Award	Category	Recipient	Result	Ref.
2023	Golden Reel Awards	Outstanding Achievement in Sound Editing – Sound Effects, Foley, Music, Dialogue and ADR for Short Form Animation Broadcast Media	"Age of Revolution" - Brad Meyer (supervising sound editor); Natalia Saavedra Brychcy (sound effects editor); Christine Gamache (dialogue editor); Carol Ma (foley editor)	Nominated	
2024	Golden Reel Awards	Outstanding Achievement in Sound Editing – Sound Effects, Foley, Music, Dialogue and ADR for Short Form Animation Broadcast Media	"Security Protocols" – Brad Meyer (supervising sound editor); Natalia Saavedra Brychcy (sound effects editor); Christine Gamache (dialogue editor); Carol Ma (foley editor)	Nominated	
2024	GLAAD Media Awards	Outstanding Kids and Family Programming	Transformers: EarthSpark	Nominated	
