= Kath Soucie =

American voice actress

- Born: Cleveland, Ohio, U.S.
- Education: Valley Forge High School; American Academy of Dramatic Arts
- Occupation: Voice actress
- Years active: 1978–present
- Agent: AVO Talent

Kath Soucie (/ˈsuːsi/ SOO-see) is an American voice actress.

== Life and career ==
Soucie was born in Cleveland, Ohio.

She first studied acting under drama teacher Manu Tupou. After graduating from Valley Forge High School, she attended the American Academy of Dramatic Arts graduating in 1976 and began a successful career on the New York stage.

In the late 1970s, Soucie appeared in several television films, including The Incredible Journey of Doctor Meg Laurel. However, she soon experienced disappointment with the physical restrictions of on-camera acting. In 1986 came her first voice-over job, for three different girls on Rambo: The Force of Freedom. Having started her voice acting career, the following year, Soucie played Janine Melnitz on The Real Ghostbusters, taking over the role from Laura Summer.

Over time Soucie took on many roles including voicing Phil, Lil and their mother Betty DeVille in Rugrats, Lola Bunny in the Looney Tunes franchise, Fifi La Fume and Li'l Sneezer in Tiny Toon Adventures, Maddie Fenton in Danny Phantom, Linka in Captain Planet and the Planeteers, Minx in Jem, Bea in Mighty Max, Dexter's Mom in Dexter's Laboratory, Agent K in The Replacements, Princess Sally Acorn in Sonic the Hedgehog, Cadpig and Rolly in 101 Dalmatians: The Series, Kat Harvey in The Spooktacular New Adventures of Casper, Morgana Macawber in Darkwing Duck, and Kanga in the Winnie the Pooh franchise. She also voiced Bubbles in What a Cartoon! before Tara Strong permanently took the role, Tuffy Mouse in The Tom and Jerry Show, Perdita in the 101 Dalmatians franchise, since 101 Dalmatians II: Patch's London Adventure (2003), Ray Ray Lee in The Life and Times of Juniper Lee, Kappei in Ninjala, and Miriam Pataki in Hey Arnold!.

Soucie also voiced Jek Lawquane in Star Wars: The Bad Batch, and a younger Nick Wilde in Zootopia, with the adult version voiced by Jason Bateman.

== Filmography ==
=== Feature films ===
Year	Title	Voice role	Notes
1991	Beauty and the Beast	Bimbettes	
1993	Hollyrock-a-Bye Baby	Pebbles Flintstone	
1996	Space Jam	Lola Bunny	
1998	Kiki's Delivery Service	Kokiri	Disney English dub
1998	The Rugrats Movie	Phil DeVille, Lil DeVille, Betty DeVille	
2000	Rugrats in Paris: The Movie	Phil DeVille, Lil DeVille, Betty DeVille	
2000	The Tigger Movie	Kanga	
2000	The Life & Adventures of Santa Claus	Natalie	
2001	The Trumpet of the Swan	Young Serena, Newscaster, Paramedic	
2001	Recess: School's Out	Counselor	
2002	Return to Never Land	Wendy Darling	
2002	Hey Arnold!: The Movie	Miriam Pataki, Mona, Reporter	
2002	Lilo & Stitch	Hawaiian Woman	
2002	The Santa Clause 2	Chet	
2003	Rugrats Go Wild	Phil DeVille, Lil DeVille, Betty DeVille	
2003	Piglet's Big Movie	Kanga	
2003	The Animatrix	Pudgy, Masa, Sara	
2004	Clifford's Really Big Movie	Jetta Handover, Madison Wolfsbottom	
2005	Pooh's Heffalump Movie	Kanga	
2005	My Neighbor Totoro	Mrs. Ogaki	Disney English dub
2005	Stuart Little 3: Call of the Wild	Forest Animals, Scouts	
2006	Curious George	Animal Control Receptionist	
2007	Happily N'Ever After	Baby, Little Red Riding Hood, Stepsisters	
2008	Space Chimps	Dr. Smothers	
2012	Wreck-It Ralph	Additional voices	
2012	Back to the Sea	Shaobao	
2013	I Know That Voice	Herself	Documentary
2016	Zootopia	Young Nick Wilde	
2019	Wonder Park	Bus Counselor Shannon	

=== Television films ===
Year	Title	Voice role	Notes
1989	Dixie's Diner	Peggy Sue	
1993	Nick & Noel	Noel	
1995	The Tale of Tillie's Dragon	Tillie	
1997	Annabelle's Wish	Annabelle	
1999	Dexter's Laboratory: Ego Trip	Dexter's Mom, Head Secretary	
2003	Kim Possible: A Sitch in Time	Preschool teacher	
2007	Hellboy: Blood and Iron	Erzsebet Ondrushko	
2013	Curious George: Swings Into Spring	Mrs. Renkins, Mrs. Quint, Mint Quint	
2013	Curious George: A Halloween Boo Fest	Mrs. Renkins, Mrs. Quint	
2016	Toasty Tales	Waffle	
2017	Hey Arnold!: The Jungle Movie	Miriam Pataki	

=== Direct-to-video films ===
Year	Title	Voice role	Notes
1991	The Little Engine That Could	Tillie, Missy	
1992	Tiny Toon Adventures: How I Spent My Vacation	Fifi La Fume, Little Boo, Little Sneezer	
1997	Beauty and the Beast: The Enchanted Christmas	Enchantress	
1997	A Christmas Carol	Mrs. Cratchit, Ghost of Christmas Past, Fan	
1998	The Brave Little Toaster Goes to Mars	Tinselina	
1998	Pocahontas II: Journey to a New World	Additional voices	
1998–2003	The Wacky Adventures of Ronald McDonald	Fry Kid	
2000	An Extremely Goofy Movie	Co-ed	
2000	Gen^{13}	Rachel	
2000	Tweety's High-Flying Adventure	Lola Bunny	
2001	Lady and the Tramp II: Scamp's Adventure	Collette, Danielle	
2001	Mickey's Magical Christmas: Snowed in at the House of Mouse	Kanga	
2002	A Very Merry Pooh Year	Kanga	
2003	101 Dalmatians II: Patch's London Adventure	Perdita	
2003	Recess: All Growed Down	Hector, Cindy, Gus's Mom	
2003	Recess: Taking the Fifth Grade	Hector	
2004	Winnie the Pooh: Springtime with Roo	Kanga	
2004	Kangaroo Jack: G'Day U.S.A.!	Jessie Carbone, Mrs. Sperling	
2005	The Legend of Frosty the Snowman	Tommy Tinkerton, Old Sara Simple	
2005	Pooh's Heffalump Halloween Movie	Kanga	
2005	Kronk's New Groove	Additional voices	
2006	Bratz: Passion 4 Fashion Diamondz	Mrs. Jones	
2006	Bambi II	Thumper's mother	
2006	The Fox and the Hound 2	Zelda	
2007	Super Sleuth Christmas Movie	Kanga	
2007	Futurama: Bender's Big Score	Cubert Farnsworth	
2008	Futurama: Bender's Game	Cubert Farnsworth	
2009	Green Lantern: First Flight	Arisia Rrab	
2009	Tigger & Pooh and a Musical Too	Kanga	
2010	Super Duper Super Sleuths	Kanga	
2010	Tom and Jerry Meet Sherlock Holmes	Tuffy	
2011	Tom and Jerry and the Wizard of Oz	Tuffy	
2013	Tom and Jerry's Giant Adventure	Tuffy	
2016	Tom and Jerry: Back to Oz	Tuffy	
2017	Tom and Jerry: Willy Wonka and the Chocolate Factory	Tuffy	
2022	Tom and Jerry: Cowboy Up!	Tuffy	
2022	Tom and Jerry: Snowman's Land	Tuffy	

=== Live-action television ===
Year	Title	Role	Notes
1979	The Incredible Journey of Doctor Meg Laurel	Becca	Live action; television film
1998	Home Improvement	Claire Taylor – screams	1 episode; uncredited
2008–2009	Imagination Movers	Voicemail	3 episodes

=== Animated television ===
Year	Title	Role	Notes
1986	Rambo: The Force of Freedom	Additional voices	
1986–1987	My Little Pony	Princess Tiffany, Princess Starburst	
1986–1989	The Smurfs	Additional voices	
1987	Pound Puppies	Arf, Mrs. Vanderspiff	
1987	Foofur	Additional voices	
1987–1991	The Real Ghostbusters	Janine Melnitz, various voices	
1988	Jem	Ingrid "Minx" Kruger	
1988	A Pup Named Scooby-Doo	Prestina	
1988	The New Yogi Bear Show	Little Yog	
1988–1990	Denver, the Last Dinosaur	Casey, Heather, Marsha Mylar, Joy, Jeremy's Crush, Betty, Mrs. Baxter, Heidi	
1988–1990	The Adventures of Raggedy Ann and Andy	Raggedy Cat	
1989	X-Men: Pryde of the X-Men	Kitty Pryde	Television pilot
1989–1990	Dink, the Little Dinosaur	Jerry, Melodi	
1989–1991	Adventures of the Gummi Bears	Princess Marie	
1990–1991	TaleSpin	Clementine Clevenger, Princess Lotta L'Amour, Phonograph Voices	
1990–1991	Fox's Peter Pan & the Pirates	The Girl in the Moon	
1990–1991	Wake, Rattle, and Roll	Cindy Bear	
1990–1991	Timeless Tales from Hallmark	Teddy Bear, Rapunzel's mother, Baby Rapunzel	
1990–1992	Attack of the Killer Tomatoes	Tara Boumdeay, additional voices	
1990–1992	Widget, the World Watcher	Brian, Kristine, Nat Elephant	
1990–1992	Pretty Piggies	Patricia	
1990–1993	Tom & Jerry Kids	Babysitter, Baby, Mom, Sugar Belle	
1990–1995	Tiny Toon Adventures	Fifi La Fume, various voices	
1990–1996	Captain Planet and the Planeteers	Linka	
1991	Toxic Crusaders	Yvonne	
1991, 1999	Little Dracula	Mrs. Dracula, Millicent	
1991–1992	Darkwing Duck	Morgana Macawber	
1991–1992	Yo Yogi!	Cindy Bear, Secret Squirrel	
1991–1992	James Bond Jr.	Goldie Finger, Barbella, Marcie Beaucoup	
1991–1992	Space Cats	Yvette Meow, Lollipop	
1991–2004	Rugrats	Phil DeVille, Lil DeVille, various voices	
1992	Raw Toonage	Girl	
1992	The Plucky Duck Show	Fifi La Fume	
1992–1993	Goof Troop	Debbie	
1992–1993	Wild West C.O.W.-Boys of Moo Mesa	Carly	
1992–1993	Super Dave	Additional voices	
1992–1994	The Little Mermaid	Attina, Flo	
1993	Animaniacs	Fifi La Fume	Episode: "Survey Ladies"
1993–1994	Mighty Max	Bea	
1993–1994	Sonic the Hedgehog	Sally Acorn, NICOLE	
1993–1995	2 Stupid Dogs	Martha, Granny Fanny, Youngest Daughter	
1993–1996	SWAT Kats: The Radical Squadron	Turmoil	
1993–1996	The Pink Panther	Thelma, Cleopatra	
1994	Where on Earth Is Carmen Sandiego?	Maria, Claire E. Net, Cora Net	
1994–1995	Aladdin	Poor village mother	
1994–1995	Beethoven	Alice Newton, Teacher 2, Teacher 3	
1994–1995	Superhuman Samurai Syber-Squad	Elizabeth Collins, Sexy Synthesizer Voice	
1994–1995	The Critic	Old Lady, Billy, Paulina Simms, Madonna, Faye Dunaway, Rosie Perez Robot	
1994–1996	Phantom 2040	Various voices	
1994–1997	Aaahh!!! Real Monsters	Dusty, Stewardess, Boy, Whiney Boy	
1994–1997	Gargoyles	Cornelia Stallman, Maggie "the Cat" Reed, Ophelia, Princess Katherine, The Weird Sisters, Princess Elena, Mary	
1995	Biker Mice from Mars	Harley	
1995–1996	Dumb and Dumber	Waitress, Allie Mae, #27	
1995–1996	Savage Dragon	Alex Wild, Ma	
1995–1996	The Hot Rod Dogs and Cool Car Cats	Baby Bumper, Spare Parts	
1995–1996	Earthworm Jim	Princess What's-Her-Name, Evil Princess, Johnny's mom	
1995–1997	What a Cartoon!	Bubbles, Ms. Keane, Dexter's Mom, additional voices	
1995–1997	The Mask: Animated Series	Evelyn, Dragon Lady	
1995–1998	Timon & Pumbaa	Lara, Suzie	
1996	Quack Pack	Daisy Duck, Agent X, Nelly The Dragon	
1996–1997	Mighty Ducks: The Animated Series	Lucretia DeCoy	
1996–1997	Bruno the Kid	Grace	
1996–1998	The Spooktacular New Adventures of Casper	Kathleen "Kat" Harvey, Marilyn Krump	
1996–1998	Jungle Cubs	Winifred, Leah, Mother Duck, Mother Mouse, Mountain Sheep	
1996–2000	Adventures from the Book of Virtues	Various voices	
1996–1999, 2001–2003	Dexter's Laboratory	Dexter's Mom, various voices	
1996–2004	Hey Arnold!	Miriam Pataki, various voices	
1997–1999	Todd McFarlane's Spawn	Cyan Fitzgerald	
1997–1999	101 Dalmatians: The Series	Cadpig, Rolly, Anita Dearly, Young Cruella	
1997–1999	Cow and Chicken	Additional voices	
1997–2000	Pepper Ann	Cissy Rooney, Mrs. Little	
1997–2001	Recess	Butch, Cindy, Jeffery, Baby, Various Kindergartners	
1997–2004	Johnny Bravo	Various voices	
1997–2006	Space Goofs	Hank's Wife	
1998	Toonsylvania	Ashley Deadman	
1998	Invasion America	Rita Carter, Sonia Lear	
1998	I Am Weasel	Timmy's Mom, Squirrel	
1998–1999	The Secret Files of the Spy Dogs	Collar Communicator Voice	
1998–1999	The Magician	Mona, Angel	
1998–1999	Hercules	Andromeda, Additional Voice Talent	
1998–2000	CatDog	Lorraine	
1998–2000	Oh Yeah! Cartoons	Dot, various voices	
1999	The Powerpuff Girls	Julie Smith, Maryanne Smith, Reporter, additional voices	
1999	The Kids from Room 402	Desk Clerk, Reporter	
1999	Courage the Cowardly Dog	Little Muriel, Carmen the Serpent	
1999	Mickey Mouse Works	Clarabelle's Instructor	
1999–2000	Mike, Lu & Og	Margery, Pig	
1999–present	Futurama	Cubert Farnsworth, Albert, Nina, Punk Kid	
2000; 2002	Clerks: The Animated Series	Lady with Dead Baby, Jay's granddaughter	
2000–2001	Buzz Lightyear of Star Command	Various voices	
2000–2011	God, the Devil and Bob	Andy Alman	
2000–2002	Baby Blues	Rodney Bitterman, Megan Bitterman	
2000–2003	Clifford the Big Red Dog	Jetta Handover, Mrs. Handover, Mary	
2000–2003	As Told by Ginger	Blake Gripling, various voices	
2000–2004	The Weekenders	Pedratishkovna "Tish" Katsufrankis, Ruby, various voices	
2001	Time Squad	Additional voices	
2001–2002	Grim & Evil	Old Lady	
2001–2002	Crayon Shin-chan	Shinnosuke Nohara, Misae Nohara (name changed to "Mitsy")	English dub
2001–2003	House of Mouse	Bimbettes, Perdita	
2001–2003	The Book of Pooh	Kanga	
2001–2004	Samurai Jack	Various voices	
2001–2004	Totally Spies!	Stella, Jason Hightower, Toll, Shirley Rogers, Barber, Redhead Girl	
2002	ChalkZone	Yadda Yadda Yeti	
2002	What's New, Scooby-Doo?	Susan Dinwiddie	Episode: "It's Mean, It's Green, It's the Mystery Machine"
2002	The Sylvester & Tweety Mysteries	Sniffles	Episode: "The Tail End"
2002–2003	Butt-Ugly Martians	Angela Young, Shaboom Shaboom, Mrs. Ellis	
2002–2006	The Cramp Twins	Lucien Cramp, Mrs. Phelps, Innocent Girl	
2002–2006	The Adventures of Jimmy Neutron, Boy Genius	Betty Quinlan	
2002–2007	Kim Possible	Kaitlin, Co-pilot, French girl, Moopey Girl, Spirit Squad Weekly Interviewer, Rocket Booster #1	
2003	Ozzy & Drix	Naurine, Celly Katz	Episode: "Lights Out!"
2003	Duck Dodgers	Handmaiden	Episode: "Quarterback Quack"
2003	Lilo & Stitch: The Series	Trick or Treater	Episode: "Spooky"
2003–2006	Clifford's Puppy Days	Daffodil, George	
2003–2007	Jakers! The Adventures of Piggley Winks	Millie, Missy Sue	
2003–2009	My Life as a Teenage Robot	XJ-2, XJ-4, XJ-5, Man, Kid, Machine Voice	
2003–2008	All Grown Up!	Phil DeVille, Lil DeVille, Betty DeVille	
2004	Static Shock	El Gata	Episode: "Hoop Squad"
2004	Justice League Unlimited	Young Boy	Episode: "The Greatest Story Never Told"
2004	Detroit Docona	Suzy Anders	
2004–2005	Stroker & Hoop	Ashley Brittany, Brittany Ashley, Doctor	
2004–2005	The Batman	Yelena Klimanov, Melanie Bromwell	2 episodes
2004–2006	Justice League Unlimited	Additional voices	
2004–2006	W.I.T.C.H.	Nerissa, Sandpit	
2004–2007	Danny Phantom	Maddie Fenton, various voices	
2005	The Grim Adventures of Billy & Mandy	Happy Huggy Stuffy Teddy Bear	
2005–2007	The Life and Times of Juniper Lee	Ray Ray Lee	
2005–2008	Ben 10	Edwin Grandsmith, Little Boy, Tiffany, Joan, Teen, Cowgirl	
2006	Ben & Izzy	Izzy	
2006–2007	My Gym Partner's a Monkey	Deidre Koala, Deb Ape	
2006–2007	Lola & Virginia	Haide	
2006–2009	The Replacements	Karen Daring / Agent K, additional voices	
2006–2011	Handy Manny	Dusty, Mrs. Bouffant, Steven, Kevin, Junior	
2006–2015	Curious George	Mrs. Renkins, Mrs. Quint	
2007	Codename: Kids Next Door	Lizzie's sister ("Operation: "G.I.R.L.F.R.I.E.N.D.")	
2007–2009	Transformers: Animated	Professor Princess, Dispatcher, Trisha	
2007–2010	My Friends Tigger & Pooh	Kanga	
2008–2009	The Spectacular Spider-Man	Martha Connors, Anna Watson, Trina	
2008–2013	Star Wars: The Clone Wars	Mon Mothma, Mina Bonteri, Jek	
2009	Chowder	Ms. Butterscotch, Pelican Lady, Unicorn, Lady	
2010–2013	Scooby-Doo! Mystery Incorporated	Nan Blake, additional voices	
2011	Generator Rex	Mouse, Female Party Goer	Episode: "Lost Weekend"
2011–2021	Young Justice	Joan Garrick, Lori Lemaris, Mera, Artur	
2011–2012	Winx Club	Countess Cassandra	
2011–2013	Pound Puppies	Flip, Blip, additional voices	
2012	Special Agent Oso	Dusty	
2012–2013	Mad	Rainbow Dash, Starfire, Magic Magic Marker Boy, Wyatt Bernstein	
2012–2016	Transformers: Rescue Bots	Professor Anna Baranova, Celine Greene, Elma Hendrickson, Lady of Griffin Rock, Ghost Cook, Young Mrs. Neederlander, Technician, Ms. Lima	
2014	Sofia the First	Queen Avery	Episode: "Scrambled Pets"
2014	Doc McStuffins	Celeste	
2014–2021	The Tom and Jerry Show	Tuffy, Mimi, Aunt Claire, Cozette, Gigi	
2014–2018	Star Wars Rebels	Minister Maketh Tua, Mira Bridger	
2015	Transformers: Robots in Disguise	Tour Guide	Episode: "Ghosts and Imposters"
2015	Bear in Underwear	Rossman	
2015–2018	Goldie & Bear	Twigs	
2015–2018	Lost in Oz	Cyra, various voices	
2015–2020	New Looney Tunes	Lola Bunny, additional voices	
2016	Kulipari	Rainbow Serpent, Pippi, Additional voices	
2017	The Lion Guard	Fujo's Mom	
2017	OK K.O.! Let's Be Heroes	Peej, Gnarlio Jr.	Episode: "We've Got Pests"
2018	The Loud House	Mrs. Vaporciyan, Club Manager	
2018	Stretch Armstrong and the Flex Fighters	Sandy Violette	Episode: "Masters of Order"
2019	If You Give a Mouse a Cookie	Mail Lady	
2020	Ninjala	Kappei	
2021	Star Wars: The Bad Batch	Jek	Episode: "Cut and Run"
2021–present	Rugrats	Phil DeVille, Lil DeVille	
2025–present	Horton!	Greta, Mama Poogle, Selma ZipperZee	

=== Video games ===
Year	Title	Role	Notes
1993	Freddy Pharkas: Frontier Pharmacist	Penelope Primm	
1995	Full Throttle	Maureen	
1995	Stonekeep	Lament / Sparkle	
1996	Space Jam	Lola Bunny	
1997	Fallout	Laura, The Master (female voice)	
1997	Outlaws	Sarah Anderson, Young James	
1997	JumpStart Adventures 5th Grade: Jo Hammet, Kid Detective	Jo Hammet	
1998	Detective Barbie In the Mystery of the Carnival Caper!	Becky	
1998	The Rugrats Movie Activity Challenge	Phil DeVille, Lil DeVille	
1998	Rugrats: Search for Reptar	Phil DeVille, Lil DeVille	
1999	Rugrats: Studio Tour	Phil DeVille, Lil DeVille	
1999	Rugrats Adventure Game	Phil DeVille, Lil DeVille, Betty DeVille	
2000	Baldur's Gate II: Shadows of Amn	Aerie	
2000	Disney's 102 Dalmatians: Puppies to the Rescue	Priscilla the Pig	
2000	Rugrats in Paris: The Movie	Phil DeVille, Lil DeVille	
2000	Looney Tunes Racing	Lola Bunny	
2000	Looney Tunes: Space Race	Lola Bunny	
2000	Bugs Bunny & Taz: Time Busters	Baladi Princess	
2000	Warriors of Might and Magic	Various	
2000	Sacrifice	Voice	
2001	Dexter's Laboratory: Science Ain't Fair	Quadraplex T-3000 Computer	
2001	Rugrats: Totally Angelica	Phil DeVille, Lil DeVille	
2001	Baldur's Gate II: Throne of Bhaal	Aerie, Young Sarevok, Alianna, Asana, Haraad, Ghostly Apparition	
2001	Clifford the Big Red Dog Learning Activities	Jetta Handover	
2002	JumpStart Advanced Preschool	Eleanor Elephant	
2002	JumpStart Advanced 1st Grade	Eleanor	
2002	JumpStart Advanced 2nd Grade	Eleanor, Lucy	
2002	Star Wars Jedi Knight II: Jedi Outcast	Tavion	
2002	Dexter's Laboratory: Mandark's Lab?	Quadraplex T-3000 Computer	
2002	The Lord of the Rings: The Fellowship of the Ring	Goldberry	
2002	Kingdom Hearts	Sally, Shock, Sora's mother	
2002	Rugrats: Royal Ransom	Phil DeVille, Lil DeVille	
2002	Final Fantasy X	Taro	
2002	Icewind Dale II	The Narrator, Maralie Fiddlebender	
2002	Jurassic Park: Dinosaur Battles	Olivia, Sabrina, Dr. Irene Corts	
2003	Arc the Lad: Twilight of the Spirits	Choco	
2003	Clifford the Big Red Dog: Phonics	Jetta	
2003	Star Wars Jedi Knight: Jedi Academy	Tavion	
2003	The Cat in the Hat	Thing 1, Thing 2	
2003	Piglet's Big Game	Kanga	
2003	Ratchet & Clank: Going Commando	Angela Cross	
2003	Final Fantasy X-2	Taro	
2004	World of Warcraft	Whitemane, Undead females	
2005	The Nightmare Before Christmas: Oogie's Revenge	Sally, Shock	
2005	Gun	Jenny	
2005	Robots	Additional voices	
2005	Winnie the Pooh's Rumbly Tumbly Adventure	Kanga	
2006	Star Wars: Empire at War	Mara Jade	
2006	Kingdom Hearts II	Sally, Shock	
2006	Tomb Raider: Legend	Amanda Evert	
2006	Cartoon Network Racing	Dexter's Mom	
2006	Thrillville	Adult Females	
2007	Thrillville: Off the Rails	Molly Noodles, Lady Shop Boss, Adult Females	
2007	Mass Effect	Rachni Queen, Kaira Stirling, Greta Reynolds	
2008	Lost Odyssey	Cooke	
2008	Tomb Raider: Underworld	Amanda Evert	
2009	Brütal Legend	Lita Halford	
2009	Dragon Age: Origins	Additional voices	
2010	StarCraft II: Wings of Liberty	Mira Han	
2011	Star Wars: The Old Republic	Female smuggler	
2012	Syndicate	Dart	
2013	StarCraft II: Heart of the Swarm	Mira Han	
2013	Lightning Returns: Final Fantasy XIII	Additional voices	
2014	The Elder Scrolls Online	Naryu Virian	
2016	King's Quest - Chapter III: Once Upon A Climb	Hagatha, Valanice, Royal Knight #3	
2016	World of Final Fantasy	Vivi Ornitier	
2018	Heroes of the Storm	Mira Han	
2018	Fallout 76	Nuclear Launch Silo, Terminals, Topher	
2019	Rage 2	Mako Kuro, Deadwood Civilians	
2019	Star Wars: The Old Republic - Onslaught	Female Smuggler	
2020	Ninjala	Kappei	
2022	Chocobo GP	Vivi Ornitier	
2024	Looney Tunes: Wacky World of Sports	Lola Bunny	
