= Travis Oates =

American voice actor (born 1978)

- Born: July 23, 1978 (age 48); Modesto, California, United States
- Occupation: Voice actor
- Years active: 2001–present

Travis Oates (born July 23, 1978) is an American voice actor. He was born in Modesto, California. He took over the voice role of Piglet in Disney's Winnie the Pooh-related media after the death of the original voice actor John Fiedler in 2005. Oates started voicing Piglet in Pooh's Heffalump Halloween Movie as an understudy actor for Fiedler finishing his recording work due to his death during production, and he later became the character's official voice actor full time beginning with Kingdom Hearts II and continuing in other Winnie the Pooh productions. He and Jim Cummings were the only two voice actors to return for the 2011 film. He also was one of the original co-hosts of the G4TV original program Arena, a competitive gaming show with Wil Wheaton in 2002. Oates owns and manages the ACME Comedy Theatre in Costa Mesa, California. He directed the 2014 film Don't Blink.

== Filmography ==
=== Television ===
- Arena - Co-host (2002)
- Doc McStuffins - Piglet (2017)
- My Friends Tigger & Pooh - Piglet
- Piper's QUICK Picks - Himself - Guest
- The Emperor's New School - Additional voices
- Mini Adventures of Winnie the Pooh - Piglet

=== Film ===
- Deadly Lessons - Bulwart
- Engaging Peter - Jack
- Fish in a Barrel - Hippie Cashier
- Poet Heads - Club Manager
- Pooh's Heffalump Halloween Movie - Additional voices
- Kronk's New Groove - Additional voices
- Winnie the Pooh: Shapes and Sizes - ADR Loop Group
- Winnie the Pooh: Wonderful Word Adventure - ADR Loop Group
- Super Sleuth Christmas Movie - Piglet
- Tigger & Pooh and a Musical Too - Piglet
- Super Duper Super Sleuths - Piglet
- Winnie the Pooh - Piglet

=== Video games ===
- Kinect Disneyland Adventures - Piglet
- Kingdom Hearts II - Piglet
- Kingdom Hearts III - Piglet
- The Lego Movie Videogame - Additional voices
- Turning Point: Fall of Liberty - Farrel
- White Knight Chronicles - Amir

Preceded by John Fiedler	Voice of Piglet; 2005–present	Succeeded by Incumbent
