= Don't Blink (film) =

- Film poster
- Directed by: Travis Oates
- Written by: Travis Oates
- Produced by: Carl W. Lucas; Alan Trever; Zack Ward
- Starring: Mena Suvari; Brian Austin Green; Joanne Kelly; Zack Ward; Robert Picardo
- Cinematography: Jayson Crothers
- Edited by: Travis Oates; Lana Wolverton
- Music by: Mike Verta
- Production companies: Echo Wolf Productions; Moorlock Machinations; Compelling Entertainment
- Distributed by: Vertical Entertainment
- Release date: September 18, 2014
- Running time: 92 minutes
- Country: United States
- Language: English

Don't Blink (also known as Last Stop) is a 2014 American psychological horror film written and directed by Travis Oates. The film stars Mena Suvari, Brian Austin Green, Joanne Kelly, and Zack Ward, who also served as producer.

The plot follows a group of 10 friends who visit a remote resort, only to discover that the place is deserted. As they attempt to uncover the mystery behind the missing guests, they are horrified to find that they too begin to disappear one by one.

Don't Blink was released on September 18, 2014, in a limited release.

== Plot ==
A group of ten friends—Jack, his girlfriend Tracy, her brother Lucas, Alex, his friend Sam, and Sam's girlfriend Charlotte, among others—arrive at a remote, isolated resort. After a long journey, they discover the resort completely deserted, with signs of sudden abandonment, such as half-eaten food and unpacked luggage. They soon realize their phones don't work, the gas pumps are locked, and the strange occurrences start to unsettle the group.

As they explore the area to search for answers, Tracy suddenly disappears, prompting increasing panic. Lucas and Noah follow, disappearing in mysterious circumstances as well. When tensions rise, Sam steals a gun from Alex and accidentally shoots him. In desperation, Sam drives away with Charlotte, but Sam vanishes, leaving Charlotte in shock.

Back at the resort, Jack and Ella grow closer, but Ella too disappears after an intimate moment. Meanwhile, there's a knock on the door, Jack answers it to find its Noah, claiming he must have fallen down a ditch. Alex grows more paranoid and violent, torturing Noah in a misguided attempt to gain answers. He then drags Noah outside and leaves him, Noah then vanishes. Alex eventually kills himself, convinced that he can at least leave behind proof of his existence. However, even his body vanishes.

As Jack and Claire wait for the authorities, the situation grows more dire. Claire is left alone when Jack disappears after a brief moment of microsleep. She is briefly reassured when emergency responders arrive, but she soon finds herself utterly alone once again, with no sign of the emergency workers, leaving her isolated in the resort.

== Cast ==
- Mena Suvari as Tracy
- Brian Austin Green as Jack
- Joanne Kelly as Claire
- Zack Ward as Alex
- Fiona Gubelmann as Ella
- David de Lautour as Noah
- Leif Gantvoort as Sam
- Emelie O'Hara as Amelia
- Curtiss Frisle as Lucas
- Samantha Jacober as Charlotte
- Robert Picardo as Man in Black

== Production ==
Filming for Don't Blink took place in Ruidoso, New Mexico, from January 9 to February 1, 2010. Director Travis Oates, a fan of Alfred Hitchcock, incorporated homages to Hitchcock's style throughout the film. Oates aimed to create a horror film with a unique twist—there is no traditional villain, no blood, and no on-screen deaths. The role of Alex was specifically written for Zack Ward, a close friend of Oates. The director intentionally left the film's ending ambiguous, believing that the lack of explicit answers would divide audiences but ultimately enhance the fear factor. During production, unplanned snowfall occurred and was cleverly incorporated into the film's script.

== Release ==
Don't Blink was given a limited release by Vertical Entertainment on September 18, 2014.

== Reception ==
Mark L. Miller of Ain't It Cool News praised Don't Blink for its unique approach, stating that "Some may be frustrated with the lack of answers here, but if you're willing to look a little outside of the box in terms of movie monsters, this one is going to be a pleaser." Sarah Boslaugh of Playback noted that while Don't Blink isn't a "cinematic masterpiece," it serves as an "OK horror movie perfect for home viewing with a group of friends." Gordon Sullivan of DVD Verdict added that the film is "an okay little supernatural mystery," though it may leave some viewers wanting more from its plot.

== Home media ==
Don't Blink was released on DVD by Vertical Entertainment on October 14, 2014. The company later re-released the film on August 28, 2019
