= Super Sleuth Christmas Movie =

- DVD cover
- Directed by: Don MacKinnon; David Hartman
- Written by: Nicole Dubuc; Jeff Kline; Brian Hohlfeld
- Produced by: Dorothy McKim
- Starring: Chloë Grace Moretz; Jim Cummings; Dee Bradley Baker; Travis Oates; Peter Cullen; Ken Sansom; Kath Soucie; Max Burkholder; Oliver Dillon; Jeffrey Tambor; Mikaila Baumel; Tara Strong
- Cinematography: Jeremy Lasky; Sharon Calahan
- Edited by: Jhoanne Reyes
- Music by: Andy Sturmer (score/songs)
- Production companies: Walt Disney Home Entertainment; Walt Disney Television Animation
- Distributed by: Buena Vista Home Entertainment
- Release date: November 20, 2007
- Running time: 43 minutes
- Country: United States
- Language: English

Super Sleuth Christmas Movie is a 2007 American Christmas-themed featurette film directed by Don MacKinnon and David Hartman, and written by Nicole Dubuc, Jeff Kline and Brian Hohlfeld. It is the first film in the Winnie the Pooh film series and is based on the hit Playhouse Disney television series My Friends Tigger & Pooh.

The first film in the series, it was released direct-to-video on November 20, 2007 and first aired on Playhouse Disney on December 6, 2008. The events of the film take place during the first season of My Friends Tigger & Pooh.

== Plot ==
On Christmas Eve, Darby and Buster spend the evening at Winnie the Pooh's house with their friends from the Hundred Acre Wood.

Playing outside, Roo and Lumpy the Heffalump find a red sack, and a reindeer named Holly stuck in a thicket patch. Holly explains that she is one of Santa's reindeer, and she's looking for Santa Claus' magical sack after it fell off his sleigh during a practice run. Roo and Lumpy have the sack, but Holly doesn't know how to get home.

All of the friends set off towards the North Pole. After some difficulties, including the loss of Tigger's mask, the group considers giving up, but Darby convinces them to persevere and to keep on going. They discover giant snowpeople, who come to life and open the path to the North Pole. They return the sack to Santa Claus, and he takes them all out in his sleigh to deliver presents. Santa Claus brings the friends home in time to celebrate Christmastime at Winnie the Pooh's house.

== Voice cast ==
- Chloë Grace Moretz as Darby
- Jim Cummings as Winnie-the-Pooh, Tigger and the Singing Snowmen
- Dee Bradley Baker as Buster and Frost the Reindeer
- Mikaila Baumel as Holly the Reindeer
- Max Burkholder as Roo
- Oliver Dillon as Lumpy the Heffalump
- Travis Oates as Piglet
- Peter Cullen as Eeyore
- Ken Sansom as Rabbit
- Kath Soucie as Kanga
- Tara Strong as Vixen the Reindeer
- Jeffrey Tambor as Santa Claus

== Songs ==
All songs written and composed by Andy Sturmer.

- "Christmas Comes Tomorrow"
- "Time to Go (On a Trek Through the Snow)"
- "Welcome to the Most Christmassy Place on Earth"

== Reception ==
=== Critical response ===
Carrie R. Wheadon of Common Sense Media gave Super Sleuth Christmas Movie a grade of three out of five stars and complimented the depiction of positive messages, calling it a "Gentle saving-Christmas tale for preschoolers." Time Out included Super Sleuth Christmas Movie in their "Christmas movies to watch this month" list of December 2020, saying, "If you’ve got tiny tots in the house, you can’t go wrong with a classic, and this is it."

=== Sales ===
Year	Film	Number	Gross (US$ sales)	Units (US sales)	Ref.
2009	Super Sleuth Christmas Movie	1	$21,923,541		

== See also ==
- List of Christmas films
