= Nicole Dubuc =

American actress and writer

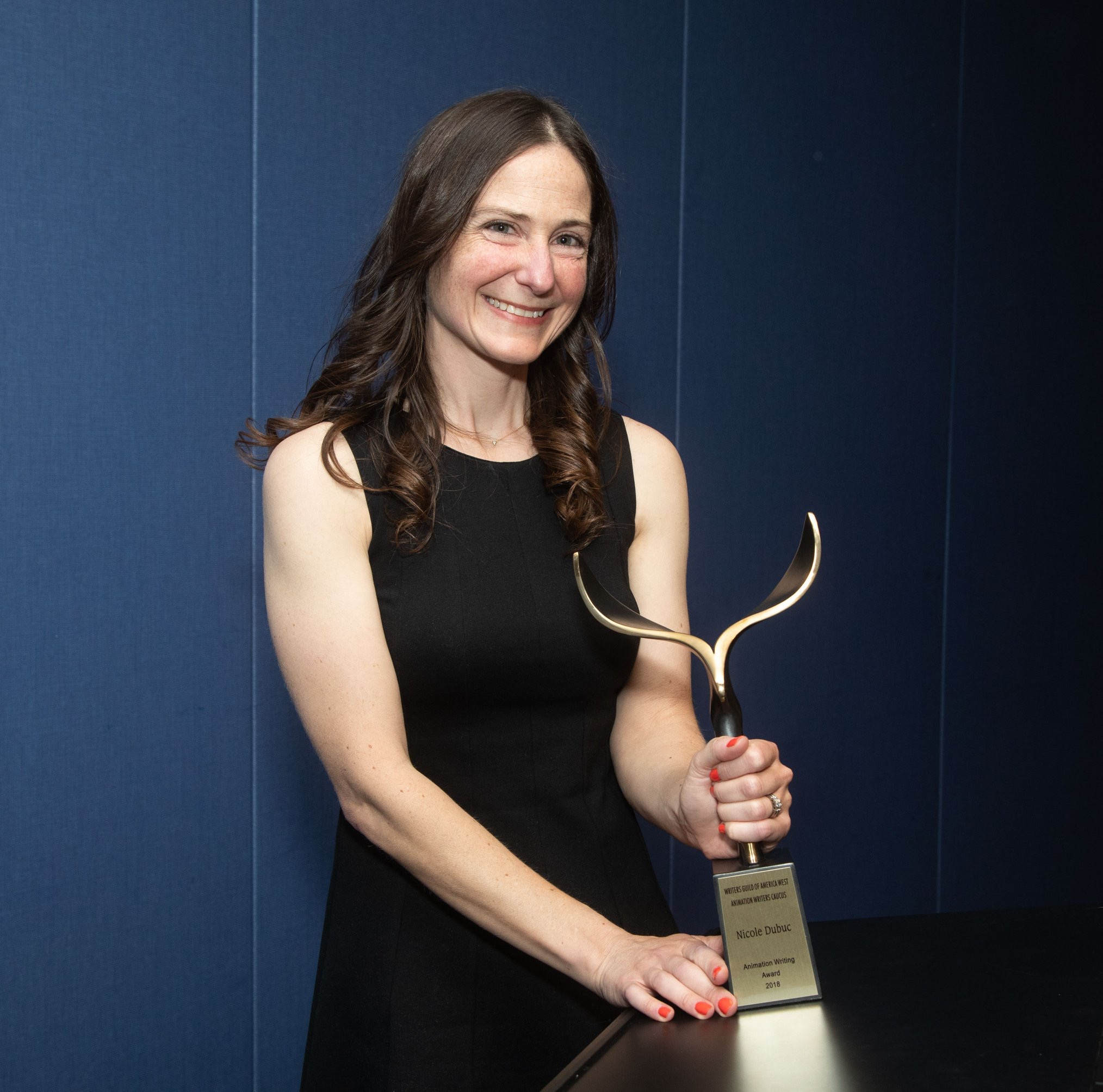
- Dubuc receiving the AWC WGA Award (2018)
- Occupations: Actress, writer
- Years active: 1983–present
- Spouse: Brian Hohlfeld (m. 2014)

Nicole Dubuc is an American actress and writer, known for her work on the Transformers franchise, including Transformers: Prime, Rescue Bots, Rescue Bots Academy, Robots in Disguise and Transformers: EarthSpark.

== Child actress ==
As a child actress, Dubuc had a recurring role as Bertha on the television series Our House and a guest appearance on the television series ALF. She starred in the popular sitcom Major Dad (1989–1993), appearing as Robin Cooper MacGillis in all 96 episodes.

She worked as a child actress for 11 years, including background voices for Prince of Tides and Searching for Bobby Fischer.

== Adult career ==
After graduating from college, Dubuc got her first work as an apprentice staff writer on the hit series, Kim Possible. She continues to act as an adult and voiced Iris West-Allen in Young Justice.

She was recently cast as Skywarp and Nova Storm in Transformers: EarthSpark.

=== As a crew member ===
She has more than 200 television and feature writing credits, including Jackie Chan Adventures, W.I.T.C.H., The Spectacular Spider-Man and Young Justice. She was the story editor and writer on the Disney series, My Friends Tigger & Pooh. She co-created Transformers: Rescue Bots with Brian Hohlfeld and Jeff Kline, served as story editor and writer, then became executive producer as of the show's fourth season. She created, executive produced, and story edited the show's spinoff, Transformers: Rescue Bots Academy.

She was an executive producer and story editor on My Little Pony: Friendship Is Magic, where she also wrote some of the songs and episodes. She was the showrunner for The Rocketeer, a series she developed for Disney Junior.

She is the first woman to write for The Flash in DC Comics, with the story "Details" appearing in 2013's The Flash Annual (volume 4) #2 of the publisher's relaunch, The New 52.

She and Michael Vogel are co-writers of a new series of books titled My Little Pony: Ponyville Mysteries, under the pen name "Penumbra Quill".

She served on the executive board of the Animation Guild, I.A.T.S.E. Local 839 for nine years (six as a trustee and three as recording secretary).

She has written the lyrics for four theme songs, including Transformers: Rescue Bots, Transformers: Rescue Bots Academy, The Rocketeer, and Hello Megan (co-written with Greg Weisman for the show-within-the-show in Young Justice).

Dubuc served as an executive producer on Transformers: Rescue Bots Academy and Transformers: EarthSpark. She is showrunner on the 2026 show HexVet for Nickelodeon. Dubuc is currently showrunning Unicorn Academy for Spin Master.

== Awards ==
Dubuc has earned eight Emmy nominations, in 2005, 2006 and 2007 for Outstanding Children's Animated Program for ToddWorld, in 2011 for "Outstanding Writing in Animation" for Transformers: Prime, in 2014 for "Outstanding Writing in a Children's Series" for R.L. Stine's The Haunting Hour, in 2015 for "Outstanding Writing in Children's Series" for Spooksville, in 2016 for "Outstanding Writing in an Animated Program" for Transformers: Rescue Bots and in 2020 for "Outstanding Writing for a Preschool Animated Program" for The Rocketeer.

She recently won the Writers Guild of America West's 2018 Animation Writers Caucus Animation Writing Award for her lifetime achievement in animation.

As a child actress, she won a Clio Award for the commercial, "Buffy's Bedtime".

== Personal life ==
Dubuc grew up in Orange County, California. She attended Yale University as a premed and graduated with a degree in English. She is married to Brian Hohlfeld.

== Filmography ==
=== Television ===
- Our House (1986–1988) - Bertha
- ALF (1988) - Hannah (Ep. "You Ain't Nothin' But a Hound Dog")
- Major Dad (1989–1993) - Robin Cooper MacGillis
- Young Justice (2011–2019) - Iris West-Allen (voice)
- Transformers: Rescue Bots (2014–2016) - Mrs. Luskey, C.A.T., Poopsie (voices)
- Miles from Tomorrowland (2015–2016) - Nuala (voice)
- The Rocketeer (2019–2020) - Honey (voice)
- Transformers: EarthSpark (2022–2025) - Skywarp, Nova Storm (voice)

=== Film ===
- Mike DA Mustang (2011) - Aileron (voice)
- The Hunted (2015) - Intern

== Crew work ==
=== Writer ===
- series head writer denoted in bold

==== Television writing ====
- Kim Possible (2003–2005)
- ToddWorld (2004–2005)
- Dragon Tales (2005)
- Jackie Chan Adventures (2005)
- The Zula Patrol (2005)
- Pinky Dinky Doo (2005)
- W.I.T.C.H. (2006)
- JoJo's Circus (2006)
- Catscratch (2006–2007)
- **My Friends Tigger & Pooh** (2007–2008)
- Care Bears: Adventures in Care-a-Lot (2007–2008)
- Tak and the Power of Juju (2007–2008)
- Mickey Mouse Clubhouse (2008)
- The Spectacular Spider-Man (2009)
- Ben 10: Alien Force (2009)
- The Super Hero Squad Show (2009–2011)
- Transformers: Prime (2010–2012)
- Jake and the Never Land Pirates (2011)
- Gaspard and Lisa (2011)
- Young Justice (2011–2013, 2019)
- Hero: 108 (2012)
- **Transformers: Rescue Bots** (2012, 2014–2016)
- Teenage Mutant Ninja Turtles (2013)
- The Haunting Hour: The Series (2013–2014)
- Spooksville (2014)
- Transformers: Robots in Disguise (2015)
- **Miles from Tomorrowland** (2015–2016)
- Star Wars Rebels (2016–2017)
- The Octonauts (2016–2017)
- **Lego Elves: Secrets of Elvendale** (2017)
- Sunny Day (2017)
- My Little Pony: Friendship Is Magic (2017–2019)
- Star Wars Forces of Destiny (2018)
- The Rocketeer (2019–2020)
- **Transformers: Rescue Bots Academy** (2019–2021)
- Pacific Rim: The Black (2021-2022)
- **Transformers: EarthSpark** (2022–2025)

==== Film writing ====
- Super Sleuth Christmas Movie (2007)
- Tigger & Pooh and a Musical Too (2009)
- Mike DA Mustang (2011)
- Postman Pat: The Movie (2014)

=== Producer ===
==== Television producing ====
- Transformers: Rescue Bots (2016)
- Lego Elves: Secrets of Elvendale (2017)
- My Little Pony: Friendship Is Magic (2018–2019)
- The Rocketeer (2019-2020)
- Transformers: Rescue Bots Academy (2019–2021)
- Transformers: EarthSpark (2022–2024)
- HexVets and Magic Pets (2025/2026)

==== Film producing ====
- My Little Pony: Best Gift Ever (2018)
- My Little Pony: Rainbow Roadtrip (2019)
