= My Friends Tigger & Pooh =

American animated children's television series

- Based on: Winnie-the-Pooh, The Red House Mystery and Four Days Wonder by A. A. Milne Pooh's Heffalump Movie by Walt Disney Animation Studios
- Directed by: Ginny McSwain (dialogue director)
- Voices of: Chloë Grace Moretz; Jim Cummings; Dee Bradley Baker; Travis Oates; Peter Cullen; Ken Sansom; Kath Soucie; Max Burkholder; Oliver Dillon; Brenda Blethyn; Rob Paulsen; James Arnold Taylor; Sydney Saylor; Mark Hamill; Struan Erlenborn
- Theme music composer: Andy Sturmer
- Composer: Andy Sturmer
- Country of origin: United States
- Original language: English
- No. of seasons: 3
- No. of episodes: 63 (list of episodes)

Production
- Executive producers: Jeff Kline (season 1); Brian Hohlfeld
- Producer: Angi Dyste
- Running time: approx. 22 minutes
- Production company: Walt Disney Television Animation

Original release
- Network: Playhouse Disney
- Release: May 12, 2007 – October 9, 2010

Related
- Super Sleuth Christmas Movie; Tigger & Pooh and a Musical Too

My Friends Tigger & Pooh is an American animated children's television series that aired on the Playhouse Disney block on Disney Channel. Inspired by A. A. Milne's Winnie-the-Pooh, the series was produced by Walt Disney Television Animation, with Brian Hohlfeld serving as executive producer. It originally aired in the United States from May 12, 2007 to October 9, 2010.

== Premise ==
The series features Winnie the Pooh and other characters from Disney's adaptations of Winnie-the-Pooh and introduces two new characters: Darby, an imaginative 6-year-old girl, and her dog, Buster. Darby is the main protagonist and an amateur sleuth. She teams up with Pooh and Tigger to form the Super Sleuths, a trio that investigates mysteries in the Hundred Acre Wood. Christopher Robin, Darby's older friend, is now a 10-year-old boy and is largely absent from the daily adventures because he is away at school or his own home and due to different grades, only appears twice throughout the series.

== Episodes ==
Season	Episodes	Originally aired	
Season	Episodes	First aired	Last aired
1	26	May 12, 2007	September 1, 2008
2	19	September 27, 2008	July 12, 2009
3	18	September 8, 2009	October 9, 2010
Films	3 films	December 6, 2008	April 10, 2010

== Voice cast ==
- Chloë Grace Moretz as Darby
- Jim Cummings as Winnie the Pooh, Tigger and Beaver
- Dee Bradley Baker as Buster and Woodpecker
- Travis Oates as Piglet
- Peter Cullen as Eeyore
- Ken Sansom as Rabbit
- Kath Soucie as Kanga
- Max Burkholder as Roo
- Oliver Dillon as Lumpy
- Brenda Blethyn as Mama Heffalump
- Tara Strong as Porcupine and Vixen
- Rob Paulsen as Raccoon
- James Arnold Taylor as Skunk
- Mark Hamill as Turtle
- Sydney Saylor as Possums
- Mikaila Baumel as Holly
- Jeffrey Tambor as Santa Claus
- Struan Erlenborn as Christopher Robin

== Production ==
In December 2005, Disney announced the creation of a new television series featuring a new female character who would replace Christopher Robin as the protagonist. My Friends Tigger & Pooh was developed by Walt Disney Television Animation. The series was the first in the Winnie the Pooh franchise to be computer-animated. The animation was handled by the Japanese animation studio Polygon Pictures. The series was executive produced and story edited by Brian Hohlfeld. After voicing Piglet in Pooh's Heffalump Halloween Movie, Travis Oates reprised his role for the series, succeeding John Fiedler, who had died on June 25, 2005. Likewise, Kyle Stanger and Jimmy Bennett were replaced by Oliver Dillon and Max Burkholder respectively in the roles of Lumpy and Roo. The series also marked the final time Peter Cullen, Ken Sansom, and Kath Soucie voiced Eeyore, Rabbit, and Kanga, respectively, before these characters were recast for the 2011 film Winnie the Pooh.

== Music ==
The show's theme song was written by Jellyfish lead singer Andy Sturmer. It was sung in the first season by Letters to Cleo singer Kay Hanley, and in the second and third seasons by Chloe Grace Moretz.

== Release ==
=== Broadcast ===
The series premiered on Disney Channel's Playhouse Disney block on May 12, 2007. It was renewed for a second season in June 2007 and for a third season in March 2008. In 2018, My Friends Tigger & Pooh was released on the UK streaming platform England and later became available series 1 and series 2 and 65 episodes of My Friends Tigger and Pooh on Disney+.

=== Home media ===
Title	Episode count	Release date	Episodes	Ref.
The Many Adventures of Winnie the Pooh: Friendship Edition	2	June 19, 2007	Rabbit's Ruta-Wakening, Tigger's Shadow of a Doubt	
Super Sleuth Christmas Movie	3	November 20, 2007	Super Sleuth Christmas Movie, Symphony for Rabbit, and Tigger Goes Snow-flaky	
Friendly Tails	6	March 4, 2008	Darby, Solo Sleuth, Doggone Buster, Darby's Tail, Tigger's Delivery Service, Pooh-Rates of the Hundred Acre Wood, and Tigger's Hiccup Pickup	
Hundred Acre Wood Haunt	6	September 2, 2008	Super-Sized Darby, Piglet's Lightning Frightening, Eeyore's Trip to the Moon, The Incredible Shrinking Roo, Eeyore's Home Sweet Home, Rabbit's Prized Pumpkin, and Halloween/Ice Cream Team (Handy Manny)	
Tigger & Pooh and a Musical Too	1	April 7, 2009	Tigger & Pooh and a Musical Too	
Super Duper Super Sleuths	3	April 6, 2010	Super Duper Super Sleuths, Darby Gets Lemons Makes Lemonade, and Dancing with Darby	
Bedtime with Pooh	6	August 17, 2010	Eeyore's Sad Day, Tigger's Bedtime for Bouncer, Buster's Bath, Once in a Pooh Moon, Pooh's Double Trouble, Eeyore Sleeps on It, and Tool for Sale (Handy Manny)	

== Reception ==
=== Critical response ===
Marilyn Moss of the Associated Press called My Friends Tigger & Pooh a "charming series," noting that "the animation is splendid, and the characters retain their charm." Emily Ashby of Common Sense Media gave the show four out of five stars, praising its positive messages and writing, "Overall, this is a delightful show that encourages kids to think critically about the world around them by involving them in fun puzzle solving. Plus, it's got upbeat songs, which kids are sure to love."

=== Ratings ===
During its first season, My Friends Tigger & Pooh was the top-ranked television series for kids aged 2–5, earning a 5.2 rating. It also performed well with women aged 18–49, achieving a 0.7 rating, according to Disney Channel. The series continued to be the top-rated show for kids aged 2–5 throughout its second season.

=== Accolades ===
Year	Award	Category	Nominee(s)	Result	Ref.
2008	Annie Awards	Best Directing in an Animated Television Production	David Hartman	Nominated	
2008	Annie Awards	Best Storyboarding in an Animated Television Production	Roy Meurin	Nominated	
2008	Humanitas Prize	Children's Animation	Brian Hohlfeld	Won	
2008	Daytime Emmy Awards	Outstanding Special Class Animated Program	Brian Hohlfeld, Angi Dyste	Nominated	
2008	Daytime Emmy Awards	Outstanding Directing in an Animated Program	David Hartman and Don MacKinnon	Nominated	
2008	Daytime Emmy Awards	Outstanding Main Title Design	Kurt Anderson, David Hartman and Kirk Van Wormer	Nominated	
2008	Young Artist Awards	Best Performance in a Voice-Over Role - Young Actress	Chloë Grace Moretz	Nominated	
2009	Daytime Emmy Awards	Outstanding Performer in an Animated Program	Jim Cummings	Nominated	
2009	Daytime Emmy Awards	Outstanding Sound Mixing - Live Action and Animation	Michael Beiriger, Ray Leonard	Nominated	
2009	Daytime Emmy Awards	Outstanding Directing in an Animated Program	Don MacKinnon, David Hartman, Ginny McSwain	Nominated	
