= Oliver Dillon =

English actor (born 1998)

- Born: Oliver Nicholas Anthony Dillon; 11 April 1998 (age 28); Henley-on-Thames, Oxfordshire, England
- Occupation: Actor
- Years active: 2006–2018
- Known for: Raa Raa the Noisy Lion

Oliver Nicholas Anthony Dillon (born 11 April 1998) is an English actor. He is best known for his role as Huffty in the CBeebies shows Raa Raa the Noisy Lion from 2011 to 2018 and as Nok Tok in Waybuloo. Dillon also voiced Lumpy the Heffalump in My Friends Tigger & Pooh airing on Playhouse Disney Channel.

== Career ==
Dillon's first job was in the Basil Brush Show as a band member in Bingo's band, but he is best known for being the voice talent of Lumpy the Heffalump in My Friends Tigger & Pooh. In November, Disney Television Animation released the DVD Pooh's Super Sleuth Christmas Movie, where Oliver also provided the voice of Lumpy. In 2008 Oliver was cast in a new animated pre-school show due to air in May 2009 Waybuloo where he voices the character of Nok Tok. He also played Fizzy the leader of a gang in The Sparticle Mystery in 2011 and voiced Hufty in the animation Raa Raa the Noisy Lion.

Dillon was born with cystic fibrosis.

== Filmography ==
Year	Category	Title	Role	Notes
2006	Children's comedy	Basil Brush Show	Bingos Band member	
2007	Disney DVD	My Friends Tigger & Pooh: Super Sleuth Christmas Movie	Lumpy	
2007	Situation comedy	My Family	Extra	
2007-2010	Animation series	My Friends Tigger & Pooh	Lumpy	Voice
2008	Game	My Friends Tigger and Pooh, Internet Game	Lumpy	Voice
2009	TV	Waybuloo	Nok Tok	Voice
2011-2018	TV	Raa Raa the Noisy Lion	Hufty	Voice
2011–2015	TV	The Sparticle Mystery	Fizzy	
2018	TV	Plebs	Barney	Episode: "Lupercalia"
