= Brian Hohlfeld =

American screenwriter

- Hohlfeld at the 2008 Daytime Emmys.
- Born: March 30, 1957 (age 69); St. Louis, Missouri, U.S.
- Occupation: Screenwriter
- Spouse: Nicole Dubuc (m. 2014)

Brian Hohlfeld (born March 30, 1957) is an American screenwriter who is best known for writing He Said, She Said and work with Disney's Winnie the Pooh franchise.

Hohlfeld is responsible for numerous uncredited feature rewrites including work on The Mighty Ducks. Before moving to Los Angeles, California, he taught film appreciation at Webster University in his hometown of St. Louis, Missouri. He wrote and produced the preschool television series My Friends Tigger & Pooh for which he received the 2008 Humanitas Prize for Children's Animation.

== Filmography ==
- Sesame Street Presents: Follow That Bird (1985; voice)
- He Said, She Said (1991; screenwriter)
- On the 2nd Day of Christmas (1997; writer)
- Winnie the Pooh: A Very Merry Pooh Year (2002; screenwriter)
- Piglet's Big Movie (2003; screenwriter)
- Pooh's Heffalump Movie (2005; screenwriter)
- Abdul Loves Cleopatra (2005; screenwriter, editor, director, and producer)
- Pooh's Heffalump Halloween Movie (2005; screenwriter)
- My Friends Tigger & Pooh (2007; writer and executive producer)
- Transformers: Rescue Bots (2012; writer and supervising producer)
- Transformers: Robots in Disguise (2017; writer)
- Sunny Day (2017, writer)
- Stretch Armstrong and the Flex Fighters (2017–2018, writer)
- Lego Elves: Secret of Elvendale (2017, writer)
- Chomp Squad (2018, writer and story editor)
- My Little Pony: Friendship Is Magic (2018–2019, writer)
- Esme & Roy (2018–2019, writer)
- The Rocketeer (2019–2020, writer)
- Transformers: Rescue Bots Academy (2019, writer)
- Young Justice (2021, writer)

== Personal life ==
Hohlfeld was born in St. Louis, Missouri.

He is married to actress, screenwriter, and producer Nicole Dubuc.
