= List of Transformers: Rescue Bots episodes =

The following is a list of episodes for the children's television series Transformers: Rescue Bots. The series is based on Hasbro's Transformers franchise and mainly one of Transformers's subdivisions Transformers: Rescue Bots.

== Series overview ==
Season	Episodes	Originally released		
Season	Episodes	First released	Last released	Network
1	26	December 17, 2011	August 18, 2012	The Hub/Hub Network
2	24	March 1, 2014	August 2, 2014	The Hub/Hub Network
3	28	November 1, 2014	June 13, 2015	Discovery Family
4	26	April 23, 2016	October 22, 2016	Discovery Family

== Episodes ==
=== Season 1 (2011–12) ===
No. overall	No. in season	Title	Directed by	Written by	Original release date
1	1	"Family of Heroes"	Patrick Archibald & Nathan Chew	Nicole Dubuc	December 17, 2011
A spaceship carrying four members of Rescue Force Sigma-17 receives a distress call from Autobot leader Optimus Prime. The spaceship self-navigates its way to Earth, on the island of Griffin Rock, near Maine, where Optimus Prime assigns the Rescue Bots on a mission: work with the Burns family and learn human customs, while concealing their status as aliens from Cybertron. Heatwave grows enraged to their mandated subservience to the humans and contemplates on leaving Earth. This changes when the Burns must stop an animatronic dinosaur that is attacking the island.
2	2	"Under Pressure"	Nathan Chew	Nicole Dubuc	December 17, 2011
When called to assist Chase and Chief Burns, the rest of the team arrives late at the scene because the siblings are not accustomed to alien robots disguised as their new vehicles. They head out to the inactive volcano Mount Magma and work together to alleviate pressure of the magma, to their success. But the lava is still being drained to tunnels that lead directly to the bunker of the fire house, where Cody is inside. Dani and Blades spot a water tower and dump its water to stop the lava flow.
3	3	"Hotshots"	Patrick Archibald	Nicole Dubuc	February 25, 2012
Dani gives Blades a new scoop claw in order to take a more integral part of the rescue missions. However, the pair manage to complete subsequent missions by themselves, leaving the others out of the action. Kade and Graham argue with Dani about this, while the Rescue Bots threaten to remove the scoop claw from Blades. Blades goes on patrol with Dani and Cody, but are struck by lightning during a storm. The rest of the group settle their differences aside and head out to save them.
4	4	"Flobsters on Parade"	Nathan Chew	Brian Hohlfeld	March 3, 2012
After Heatwave grows fed up with maintaining his robot disguise, Chase, Blades, and Boulder must battle hundreds of jagged claws when an enormous swarm of snapping lobsters overruns the annual Griffin Rock summer festival.
5	5	"The Alien Invasion of Griffin Rock"	Patrick Archibald	Greg Johnson	March 10, 2012
Huxley Prescott is determined to dig up scoop about aliens invading planet earth. However he finds that his enthusiasm could indeed put many people in danger. The Rescue Bots also question their disguise to sustain that 'robot' image for the public instead of revealing their true identity.
6	6	"Cody on Patrol"	Patrick Archibald	Bob Forward	March 17, 2012
When Cody super-charges his go-kart to help in the team's rescue missions, he accidentally unleashes a swarm of futuristic nanites.
7	7	"Four Bots and a Baby"	Nathan Chew	Dean Stefan	April 14, 2012
Cody begrudgingly volunteers to watch over Doc Greene's "Robo-Baby", a robotic baby that simulates the demeanor and actions of a real baby. While playing back at the fire station, Robo-Baby throws a rubber ducky into the sink, where the toy clogs a sewer pipe, eventually causing a sinkhole to appear in front of the town's bank. While the Rescue Bots leave to rescue the people inside the falling building and Cody monitors the situation, the Robo-Baby becomes missing, leaving everyone alarmed. Heatwave uses his olfactory sensors to locate the Robo-Baby climbing up a windmill at the town's windmill farm, and save it from the sharp rotors.
8	8	"Walk on the Wild Side"	Nathan Chew	Nicole Dubuc	April 21, 2012
Boulder decides that the team needs an animal mascot, but maybe a zoo isn't the best place to find one when they obtain a lion from the zoo.
9	9	"Christmas in July"	Patrick Archibald	Brian Hohlfeld	April 28, 2012
The Burns family and the Rescue Bots have to stop a snow storm in July when Doc Greene's weather machine goes haywire.
10	10	"Deep Trouble"	Nathan Chew	Christopher J. Gentile	May 5, 2012
A shark targeting high-tech ocean equipment is spotted off the Griffin Rock shore.
11	11	"Return of the Dinobot"	Patrick Archibald	Luke McMullen	May 12, 2012
An intruder hacks into Griffin Rock's central computer by using Doc Greene's pet Dinobot Trex and wreaks havoc.
12	12	"The Other Doctor"	Nathan Chew	Ken Pontac & Warren Graff	May 19, 2012
A scientist named Dr. Morocco introduces his latest invention, the MorBot, which saves the town from disasters, but also leaves everyone else out of the action. Dr. Morocco successfully convinces Mayor Lusky into decommissioning the Rescue Bots in favor of his invention.
13	13	"The Reign of Morocco"	Patrick Archibald	Greg Johnson	May 19, 2012
With the Rescue Bots no longer allowed to save the town, Dr. Morocco terrorizes the town with his invention, for the purpose of getting revenge on Charlie Burns, Doc Greene, and Mayor Luskey. The Rescue Bots take on new hobbies during their downtime. Meanwhile, Cody and Frankie manage to find evidence at Doc Greene's laboratory proving that Dr. Morocco's invention has all been part of a villainous plan.
14	14	"Small Blessings"	Nathan Chew	Ed Valentine	June 9, 2012
During Myles and Evan's attempt to rob Doc Greene's lab, Heatwave, Blades, and Boulder are accidentally shrunk and the Burns family must work without their partners.
15	15	"The Griffin Rock Triangle"	Patrick Archibald	Mairghread Scott	June 16, 2012
The Burns family watches film reels of the Griffin Rock Triangle phenomenon taped by Professor Anna Baranova. They embark on an underwater investigation and stumble upon the Midgard, an underwater laboratory trapped near an ocean trench. They scope the laboratory's interior, where they find Baranova, who has been inside for 28 years. Baranova initially refuses to leave her new home, but, after being persuaded by Cody's reasoning to move back to Griffin Rock, detonates her laboratory.
16	16	"Rules and Regulations"	Nathan Chew	Dean Stefan	June 23, 2012
When Heatwave leads his team into a lethal situation against Chief Burn's orders, Chase must find a way to help them while following the rules.
17	17	"The Lost Bell"	Patrick Archibald	Greg Johnson	June 30, 2012
The Rescue Bots and Cody get separated from the Burns family during a thunderstorm and drift to a remote island. There, the team learns how to survive like pioneers. They also locate a pirate ship, and inside lays a bell that was stolen from Griffin Rock by pirates about 200 years ago. The next morning, the team departs the island on their way back to Griffin Rock, with the bell on their pirate boat, and they are able to locate and reunite with the family.
18	18	"Bumblebee to the Rescue"	Nathan Chew	Brian Hohlfeld	July 7, 2012
The Rescue Bots and the Burns family investigate a meteor that has landed on Wayward Island. Bumblebee arrives at the island to join the group. Receiving directions from Optimus Prime remotely, the Autobots successfully destroy the meteor, but its particle components act as a parasite, causing a paralytic effect on them. Using a meteor sample they obtained, the Burns create an antidote that reverses said effect.
19	19	"You've Been Squilshed"	Patrick Archibald	Thomas Pugsley & Greg Klein	July 14, 2012
Doc Greene acquires a slimy green compound, the "Squilsh", from Mars, and summons it to life with a mild electric shock. The Squilsh devours anything in its path and grows progressively bigger after each meal, and it eventually rampages through Griffin Rock. Graham and Boulder apply their engineering skills to hands-on experience of defeating the creature.
20	20	"Countdown"	Nathan Chew	Catherine Clinch	July 21, 2012
Doc Greene accidentally releases a swarm of bugs from the town's museum, the Hall of Inspiration. As the bugs disperse throughout Griffin Rock, the citizens mysteriously disappear and are teleported to a cavern. Cody and Frankie contact Professor Anna Baranova, who explains that these bugs are called "tracers", programmed to protect the town's population from a forthcoming cataclysm. The location of the cavern, however, has never been disclosed historically, so the Rescue Bots are forced to figure out such location in order to save the fettered citizens.
21	21	"The Haunting of Griffin Rock"	Patrick Archibald	Steve Aranguren	July 28, 2012
The Burns receive mass calls of ghosts supposedly haunting Griffin Rock. In an analysis conducted by Frankie, these supposed phantoms are revealed to be merely holograms depicting the town's pioneers. These holograms were also used as a ruse for two escaped convicts to engage in criminal actions unnoticed. Pioneer Charlotte Wayne (also known as the Lady of Griffin Rock) however is witnessed to be a potentially real ghost, because she has never been registered into the town museum's database, so there exists no corresponding hologram for her.
22	22	"Little White Lies"	Nathan Chew	Brian Hohlfeld	August 4, 2012
The kids are covertly planning a surprise birthday party for their father. Chief Burns tells them he is heading to the docks, but actually takes a trip to the bakery for a cake, as a present for his family, thinking that they forgot his birthday. Chase discovers this to be a lie and is confounded by this. While setting up the party back home, the kids and the other Rescue Bots realize that Chase and Chief Burns are missing, and search the entire town. Eventually they discover the two trapped inside an underground mine, and save them from the flooding water and falling rocks.
23	23	"Shake Up"	Patrick Archibald	Nicole Dubuc	August 11, 2012
Seismic waves shake Griffin Rock, but they are artificial and caused by a reverberating woofer hidden underground. Such a loudspeaker is inadvertently connected remotely to Doc Greene's jukebox, where Doc Greene is practicing his dance moves. Meanwhile, Frankie creates a music video that includes footage of the Rescue Bots. Suspicious, she follows them into a tunnel during their mission to remove the loudspeaker inside, and attempts to converse with Heatwave. When the rocks are falling from the tunnel ceiling, Heatwave breaks from his "robot" character to save her, during which she finally learns of the Rescue Bot's secret.
24	24	"Rescue Boy"	Nathan Chew	Marty Isenberg	August 11, 2012
Doc Greene invents a repulsor badge that allows the wearer to be invincible, and after he saves the mayor from danger, he is then deemed a superhero, by the name "Rescue Boy". Cody uses it to participate more on the front lines, in missions with the rest of his family (who feel jealous about the badge and him taking over missions), against Chief Burns' concern of his safety. His superhero status, however, is halted when his repulsor badge is overloaded and projects a nonstop field, enclosing him inside. Boulder uses neutralizing gloves, also invented by Doc Greene, to bypass the repulsive field and successfully remove the badge from Cody, shortly before it detonates. Cody then announces that he has given up being a superhero.
25	25	"It's a Bot Time"	Patrick Archibald	Nicole Dubuc	August 18, 2012
Doc Greene calls the entire Burns family to demonstrate testing of an abandoned time machine. He sends his helper bot Dither into the time warp, which takes the Rescue Bots, Cody, and Frankie along with them. They are transported into the year 1939, with no discernible method of returning to the present. Optimus Prime—informed by Chief Burns of the dilemma—and Bumblebee also travel back to 1939, to provide their Energon (the predominant energy of the Autobots) needed to repower the machine. All the time travelers manage to return to the present, but much to their devastation discover that the timeline has been altered, as they had inadvertently left Dither behind in the past.
26	26	"Bot to the Future"	Nathan Chew	Greg Johnson	August 18, 2012
The present-day town of Griffin Rock, renamed "Moropolis", is ruled by Doctor Morocco and his MorBots. The protagonists scourge the town and arrive at the Hall of Inspiration, where they encounter Chief Burns, who, despite having no memories of them, takes them to his fire station. Morocco calls upon an entire armada of his MorBots to launch a mass attack. The Burns family retaliate with their Mobile Headquarters (MHQ) vehicle; the Autobots partake in smashing the MorBots. The group returns to the past with the MHQ, where Heatwave reclaims Dither, and travel back to the present day, with their original timeline restored. Chief Burns says at the end of the episode that the MHQ might come in handy.

=== Season 2 (2014) ===
No. overall	No. in season	Title	Directed by	Written by	Original release date	US viewers (millions)
27	1	"Road Trip"	Patrick Archibald & Tim Maltby	Brian Hohlfeld	March 1, 2014	0.11
Doc Greene and Frankie are now aware of the Rescue Bots' secret. A transporter tube invented by Doc Greene takes Cody for a crazy ride and it's up to Kade to save the day while everyone else is unavailable. Later, they find out the transporter is taking Cody where Kade had planned to have the date with Haley.
28	2	"Sky Forest"	Nathan Chew	Greg Johnson	March 1, 2014	0.11
The friendship between Cody and Frankie is threatened when they both enter a young inventors contest and Frankie's Sky Forest project wins (Cody created a sprinkler suit). Upon Mayor Lusky using special experimental fertilizer from the "Best Left Forgotten" room to increase the plant growth, Cody and Frankie must work to help the Rescue Bots stop the sentient plants.
29	3	"One for the Ages"	Patrick Archibald & Tim Maltby	Dean Stefan	March 8, 2014	0.28
Chief Burns is sick with the flu and after Myles and Evan steal a shipment of new tech from the government, Kade takes over while his father recuperates. Then, an accident with Doc Greene's stasis machine ages Cody into an adult and turns Kade into a little kid.
30	4	"Tip of the Iceberg"	Nathan Chew	Brandon M. Easton	March 15, 2014	0.20
An iceberg brings danger to Griffin Rock. The Rescue Bots and the Burns family find the S.S. Isolde which was driven by Cody's Great-Grandpa Zachary and there is some cargo that is being targeted by Dr. Morocco (who had patched things up with the mayor after returning his boat to him).
31	5	"A Virtual Disaster"	Tim Maltby	Nicole Dubuc	March 22, 2014	0.18
During a snow day, Cody and Blades play a virtual reality game called "Griffin Rock Element Quest 1.0." When the virtual reality game becomes real, Heatwave learns that Blades has what it takes to be a true hero.
32	6	"Spellbound"	Nathan Chew	Mairghread Scott	March 29, 2014	0.16
The Bots and the Burns family are in mind-controlled stupors upon finding a strange golden cellphone. When the rest of the town is affected as well, Cody and Boulder scramble to snap them out of it before they're sucked in.
33	7	"Prescott's Bots"	Tim Maltby	Zac Atkinson	April 5, 2014	0.31
Huxley Prescott's reality show called "Huxley Prescott's Bots" puts the Rescue Bot team in grave danger.
34	8	"Blame the Gremlins"	Nathan Chew	Amy Gershwin	April 12, 2014	0.17
In order to deal with his recurring gremlin nightmares, Kade goes to Doc Greene who uses a special device that manifests live holograms of the gremlins. Graham and Dani also make fun of Kade, which does not help his nightmare situation. When the gremlins break out and start draining energy from different devices, Cody and the Rescue Bots find a way to rescue Kade and Griffin Rock from gremlins. In the end, Kade's nightmares vanish, while Graham and Dani's nightmares have just begun.
35	9	"Feed the Beast"	Kevin Altieri	Greg Weisman	April 19, 2014	0.08
Cody and the Rescue Bots hunt down a Bigfoot-like beast called the Maine Ridge Monster. They soon discover that the Maine Ridge Monster sightings have a connection with a synthetic non-expiring food called Fo-Foo (short for "Forever Food") which was among the things in the "Best Left Forgotten" Room. They also discover that the identities of the Maine Ridge Monsters are Mayor Luskey and Graham, all because they ate the Fo-Foo. Can Mayor Luskey and Graham return to normal, or will Cody and the rest of the Burns family be the Maine Ridge Monsters's dinner?
36	10	"What Lies Below"	Nathan Chew	Brian Hohlfeld	April 26, 2014	0.34
When Cody's Uncle Woodrow comes to visit the Burns family, he claims that there are aliens living underground. When Cody and Uncle Woodrow are trapped underground, the Burns family and the Rescue Bots enlist the help of Optimus Prime (who is in Griffin Rock on an Energon-mining mission) to rescue them. In the end, the Burns family tell Woodrow the truth about the Rescue Bots and Cybertron.
37	11	"What Rises Above"	Kevin Altieri	Steven L. Sears	May 3, 2014	0.09
The Burns family, the Rescue Bots, and Optimus Prime must find a way back to the surface of the Earth. They also find a subterranean location filled with prehistoric animals and a cave filled with Energon.
38	12	"Space Bots"	Nathan Chew	Greg Johnson	May 10, 2014	0.10
Doc Greene and Graham test out a space elevator called the Asgard for Professor Anna Baranova which will go to outer space. When the experiment with the Asgard goes wrong, Cody and the Rescue Bots must find a way to save Doc Greene and Graham Burns from being stranded in outer space forever.
39	13	"The Island of Misfit Tech"	Kevin Altieri	Greg Weisman	May 17, 2014	TBA
An out-of-control mechanical bull leads Cody and the Rescue Bots on an adventure through the mysterious "Beam Box" (where Doc Greene is unsure who built it) to the Island of Misfit Technology, an island where the most dangerous technology is stored.
40	14	"The Vigilant Town"	Nathan Chew	Atul N. Rao	May 24, 2014	TBA
After some accidents, Mayor Luskey replaces Griffin Rock's computer system with a super-computer called the Vigilant Computer that calls itself Vigil. Soon, Griffin Rock is being taken over by Vigil who plans to make Griffin Rock 100% safe.
41	15	"Buddy System"	Kevin Altieri	Nicole Dubuc	May 31, 2014	TBA
Chief Charlie Burns heads up the Lad Pioneers scout group while using the buddy system in their hike. A bunch of snakes break loose from their crates that were bound for the Griffin Rock Zoo. Due to the keys to the Buddy Bracelets accidentally getting broken by Jerry's truck, the hiking group now has to head to the EMP Zone to get them off while the Rescue Bots round up all the escaped snakes.
42	16	"In Search of the Griffin's Nest"	Nathan Chew	Zac Atkinson	June 7, 2014	TBA
While on a hike on Mount Griffin with his fellow Lad Pioneers, a brief earthquake occurs where a flying car crashes into Mount Griffin. While Cody, Graham, and the Rescue Bots go on a quest to Wayward Island to find the mythical Griffin's nest, Chief Burns and Chase investigate a series of metal objects that are being drawn towards Wayward Island.
43	17	"Bots and Robbers"	Kevin Altieri	Chris "Doc" Wyatt & Kevin Burke	June 14, 2014	TBA
Myles and Evan steal mechanite from the museum where they use it to power their Tech Wrecker to disable all of Griffin Rock's technology. While the Burns family tries to save Griffin Rock at the expense of modern technology, Chase learns about the detective movies and uses his imagination to be like a film detective where he goes undercover upon Myles and Evan carjacking him.
44	18	"Rescue Dog"	Nathan Chew	Brian Hohlfeld	June 21, 2014	TBA
While the Burns family are taking care of their boat, the Rescue Bots save a stranded stray dog from being hit by a high tide and give him shelter at the Griffin Rock Firehouse at the time when the 39th Annual Griffin Rock Dog Show is occurring. Following a fire at the dog show where the stray dog saves a dog owned by Mayor Luskey's wife, it is shown that the stray dog is a lost dog named Buster who worked for the Coast City Fire Department where it was lost at sea during a rescue. Now the Rescue Bots must find a way to reunite Buster with the Coast City Fire Department.
45	19	"Changes"	Kevin Altieri	Nicole Dubuc	June 28, 2014	TBA
Optimus Prime calls Heatwave to the mainland in order to go through an energy-harnessing training for a vehicle rescan. Meanwhile, Dr. Morocco uses the prototype weather machine found on Great-Grandpa Zachary's ship to cause various weather phenomenons as a diversion to find out where the Rescue Bots came from.
46	20	"Movers and Shakers"	Kevin Altieri	Jackson Grant & Shannon McKain	July 5, 2014	TBA
Following an incident with the Power Planter during Griffin Rock's "Plant-A-Tree Day" event, various ants, badgers, groundhogs, porcupines, and skunks start entering town where they start causing havoc. Afterwards, the Rescue Bots go up against the Power Planter when it starts collecting every heat source on Griffin Rock.
47	21	"Odd Bot Out"	Kevin Altieri	Dean Stefan	July 12, 2014	TBA
Bumblebee is returning to Griffin Rock for a mission. Blades feels left out when Dani recruits Bumblebee for a top secret mission that involves finding the Liquifier that has been activated upon Madeline Pynch establishing an ocean drilling platform against Mayor Luskey's orders. As a result, the entire island is being liquified with water geysers and sinkholes occurring. When Bumblebee is busy helping the other Rescue Bots with the water rescues, Optimus Prime arrives to help Blades locate the Liquifier.
48	22	"The Griffin Rock Express"	Nathan Chew	Greg Johnson	July 19, 2014	TBA
A mysterious superhero arrives in Griffin Rock where he saves Graham from a boulder that came off of one of the mining trucks that was working on the train tunnels for a hover-train the Griffin Rock Express. Cody discovers that Frankie is wearing Cody's Rescue Boy costume and using the Phase Bit (a phasing technology) in order to help out in Griffin Rock while the Rescue Bots were busy. Things get worse when the Griffin Rock Express malfunctions and becomes a runaway train.
49	23	"Double Villainy"	Kevin Altieri	Nicole Dubuc	July 26, 2014	0.22
Dr. Morocco and Madeline Pynch conspire to not only keep the Rescue Bots for themselves, but also to get to the gold that is underneath Griffin Rock.
50	24	"Rise of the Heroes"	Nathan Chew	Greg Johnson	August 2, 2014	TBA
With the Rescue Bots being mindless slaves to Dr. Morocco and Madeline Pynch, the Burns family must find a way to get their memories back before Griffin Rock sinks into the ocean from the resulting methane gas explosion underground.

=== Season 3 (2014–15) ===
A third season has been announced. In addition, Michael Bell is returning to the Transformers franchise for the third season as High Tide. A third season was also the first Hasbro Studios and DHX Media co-production not to have a TV-Y rating (which DHX Media also later acquired library of children's and Family TV content for Beast Wars: Transformers in November 2014.)

No. overall	No. in season	Title	Directed by	Written by	Original release date	US viewers (millions)
51	1	"Land Before Prime"	Nathan Chew	Nicole Dubuc	November 1, 2014	TBA
During a training session overseen by Optimus Prime, a Pterodactyl disrupts the training session where it is suspected to be the same one from the prehistoric caverns. Upon Doc Greene placing a tracking device on it, the Rescue Bots trace it to Wayward Island which is now filled with dinosaurs upon finding a sinkhole there. When the Rescue Bots end up trapped in a tar pit, Optimus Prime learns to become a Dinobot to save them.
52	2	"Big Game"	Kevin Altieri	Greg Johnson	November 1, 2014	TBA
As Optimus Prime works to get used to his Primal Mode, the Rescue Bots work to keep him from causing havoc on Griffin Rock. A big-game hunter named Colonel Quint Quarry arrives on Griffin Rock to target Optimus Prime where he hunts him on Quarry Safari Land. Now the Rescue Bots must rescue Cody and Optimus Prime.
53	3	"Too Many Kades"	Frank Squillace	Brian Hohlfeld	November 8, 2014	TBA
A charity game is occurring at Griffin Rock at the same time when Doc Greene's Imaging Chamber starts making clones of Kade's waking thoughts. After Doc Greene's Imaging Chamber creates exact replicas of him with different personalities as part of the demonstration, Cody and the Rescue Bots show Kade a valuable lesson in teamwork when it comes to a gas leak at the Natural Gas Reserve.
54	4	"Phantom of the Sea"	Nathan Chew	Greg Johnson	November 15, 2014	TBA
The Rescue Bots and the Burns family get on the S.S. Phantom Voyager, a ghost ship that emerges on the west side of Griffin Rock once every ten years. When Cody, Dani, Kade, Graham, and the Rescue Bots end up on the ship when it disappears to an unknown location, they find Captain Ansel Ambrose and the cause of the ship's disappearance in the form of a time machine that was being transported on the S.S. Phantom Voyager by Dr. Morocco and was damaged when the ship was struck by lightning. After a visit to 10 years into the future, the Rescue Bots and the Burns must find a way to get back to their own time and deactivate the time machine.
55	5	"Unfinished Business"	Kevin Altieri	Nicole Dubuc	November 22, 2014	TBA
Recalling a mission left unaccomplished prior to their arrival on Earth, Chase and Boulder return to space to complete the rescue where they have to deal with an Energon Eater.
56	6	"No Place Like Dome"	Kevin Altieri	Steve Granat & Cydne Clark	November 29, 2014	TBA
When Doc Greene creates a giant dome to shield Griffin Rock from Hurricane Opie, he inadvertently gives Vigil a second chance to "protect" the island. Now the Rescue Bots must stop Vigil before he gains full control of the giant dome and makes everyone in Griffin Rock asleep for good.
57	7	"Bugs in the System"	Nathan Chew	Andrew Robinson	December 6, 2014	TBA
According to Dr. Morocco, Griffin Rock is threatened by mutant metal-eating army ants he had purchased. What the Burns family and the Rescue Bots don't know is that the metal-eating army ants are part of a diversion so that one of his MorBots can spring him from his jail cell.
58	8	"Switcheroo"	Kevin Altieri	Brian Hohlfeld	December 13, 2014	TBA
The bodies of the Burns family, the Greene family, and the Rescue Bots are switched by a dangerous nebula in outer space. Now they must adapt to their switched bodies and handle their recent rescue missions while trying to find a way to get back into their own bodies.
59	9	"The Riders of Midwinter"	Nathan Chew	Greg Johnson	December 13, 2014	TBA
The Rescue Bots take on new responsibilities during a terrible snowstorm.
60	10	"Bot-Tastic Voyage"	Frank Squillace	Zac Atkinson	December 20, 2014	TBA
Following the bio-electric chip incident in Dither where he swipes some toasters, Doc Greene discovers some bacteria on the bio-electric chip where it was created in Doc's bacteria-free clean room. Kade accidentally ingests Doc's Scrub-Mites (a group of microscopic bacteria-eating robots) that are on a doughnut and the Rescue Bots must go inside his body to save him before the Scrub-Mites eat all the good bacteria and the bad bacteria in him.
61	11	"Quarry vs. Quarry"	Nathan Chew	Mairghread Scott	December 27, 2014	TBA
Colonel Quarry returns and seeks additional robotic dinosaurs from Doc Greene after he holds Professor Baranova hostage during a fishing/picnic trip. Quint has mistook Optimus Prime's Dinobot form for one of Doc Greene's inventions. With help from Optimus Prime and Boulder (who both have Dinobot forms), Heatwave, Chase, and Blades transform into Dinobots with Energon Patches in order to save Professor Baranova. The rest of the Burns family must find a way to rescue Optimus Prime, Doc Greene, Frankie, Cody, and the Rescue Bots before Colonel Quarry can sell them to his clients.
62	12	"Chief Woodrow"	Nathan Chew	Greg Johnson	January 18, 2015	TBA
While Charlie Burns is away at a Police Conference, Woodrow Burns returns to watch over the rest of the Burns family. Woodrow then takes command of the Rescue Bots team without the entire Burns family knowing about it where they have trouble with his cooking that involves things he made in the rainforest. After Woodrow's successful rescue strategy save Mayor Luskey's boat, Mayor Luskey makes Woodrow the acting police chief where he eventually helps the Rescue Bots when some beacons Mayor Luskey was using to improve the Dolphin Wonder Festival gets some dolphins stuck in Griffin Rock's wetlands.
63	13	"Did You See What I Thaw?"	Kevin Altieri	Dean Stefan	February 28, 2015	TBA
On Wayward Island, the Burns family and the Rescue Bots look for Energon and find a caveman frozen in ice within a defrosting ice cave. After the caveman is thawed out in Doc Greene's lab where it is discovered that he is wearing an Energon necklace, Cody and the Rescue Bots try to help the caveman that Boulder named Ira adjust to life in Griffin Rock. Blades and Heatwave look for Energon and the Burns family and Doc Green works to keep Ira's true nature from Mayor Luskey and the visiting Mrs. Dumont.
64	14	"The Attack of Humungado"	Frank Squillace	Jackson Grant & Shannon McKain	March 7, 2015	TBA
Following a fire at the drive-in theater's projection booth, Doc Green gives Mr. Bunty a Holomorphic Projector to replace the movie projector as Kade plans to find a copy of his favorite Kaiju movie "Attack of Humungado" (a movie about the Godzilla-like monster Humungado) to give it a test run. During the test run, a power surge from Mr. Bunty's microwave interacts with the Holomorphic Projector bring Rayvenous out. When they catch Rayvenous (a flying ice-spewing manta ray monster) and plan to return it into the movie, the Holomorphic Projector's control knob falls off causing Humungado to come out of the movie as well. Now the Rescue Bots must fight Humungado and Rayvenous.
65	15	"Thieves Like Us"	Nathan Chew	Marty Isenberg	March 14, 2015	0.11
On the first day of Spring, the Burns family and the Rescue Bots stop a mudslide. Mayor Luskey establishes Bot Appreciation Day where anyone who attends will each get a miniature action figure made by Doc Greene's 3-D printer. When Myles and Evan reprogram the action figures to steal for them, the Rescue Bots must deal with the action figures while the Burns family is stuck at sea due to the kelp and the poisonous jellyfish.
66	16	"Time After Time"	Kevin Altieri	Claire Yorita Lee	March 21, 2015	0.13
Cody experiences the same day twice which is caused by the renovated Mayor Luskey Clock Tower that is powered by magno-fusion technology. Cody needs help discovering what is causing the time loop that's only affecting him.
67	17	"Pirates Ahoy"	Frank Squillace	Greg Weisman	March 28, 2015	TBA
During Griffin Rock's "Founder's Day" event, the Burns family are suspended from their duties by Mayor Luskey when a connection with Horace Burns and the pirates that is led by Horace's wife Bertha Carnahan is discovered by Huxley Prescott who got the info from a visiting Woodrow. While Mayor Luskey, Milo, Mr. Alper, and Mr. Harrison form the Citizen Safety Board to take the place of the Burns family, the Rescue Bots and the Burns family search the Griffin Keys to find evidence that would clear the Burns family's name.
68	18	"Turning the Tide"	Nathan Chew	Steve Granat & Cydne Clark	April 11, 2015	TBA
Optimus Prime's old acquaintance High Tide arrives on Earth to teach the Rescue Bots how to rescue people from the ocean at the time when Mayor Luskey wants the Burns family to investigate the abandoned oil platform. High Tide puts the Rescue Bots through different drills while Cody is partnered with High Tide to teach him about Earth's customs. When an oil spill occurs at the oil platform with Doc Greene and Frankie trapped there upon the faulty wiring setting the oil on fire, the Rescue Bots and High Tide must work to save them.
69	19	"The Last of Morocco"	Kevin Altieri	Kevin Burke & Chris Wyatt	April 18, 2015	TBA
Frankie has been accepted by a summer science camp while Cody wasn't. Cody, Frankie, and Blades encounter Jules Verne who has traveled through time to find his old friend Dr. Thaddeus Morocco. The Rescue Bots, the Burns family, and High Tide help Jules Verne find an aged Dr. Morocco where he wants Jules Verne to help reconstruct the Verne device to power his Youth Chamber. When Jules Verne doesn't want to help after hearing of his criminal activities, Dr. Morocco uses force to get Jules to help him by using a control device to control some sperm whales and a giant squid into attacking High Tide's ship.
70	20	"The New Recruits"	Frank Squillace	Mairghread Scott	April 25, 2015	TBA
Graham, Cody, and Frankie investigate the earthquake on Wayward Island, where they find a Cybertronian ship in the same cave where the Burns family and the Rescue Bots found Ira the Caveman frozen in ice. They awaken the Rescue Bots Blurr and Salvage and bring them to Griffin Rock to meet Optimus Prime. While on a training session with Blurr and Salvage, the Rescue Bots decide to keep an eye on them.
71	21	"Rescue Bots Academy"	Nathan Chew	Zac Atkinson	May 2, 2015	TBA
Cody and the Rescue Bots teach Blurr and Salvage everything they need to know about Griffin Rock and the planet Earth by showing footage of previous rescues.
72	22	"A New Hero"	Kevin Altieri	Marty Isenberg	May 9, 2015	TBA
After an incident where Heatwave condemns him to remain in the firehouse until further notice, Blurr takes his leave from the Burns family. A solar flare affects all of Griffin Rock's technology. When a satellite threatens to crash to Earth, Blurr must spring into action to help the Rescue Bots.
73	23	"Four-Legged Hero"	Frank Squillace	Dean Stefan	May 16, 2015	TBA
The undercover status of the Rescue Bots is put in danger by Servo when Mrs. Luskey's dog Poopsie starts to get involved with Servo which causes some mayhem in Griffin Rock.
74	24	"Endangered Species"	Nathan Chew	Andrew R. Robinson	May 23, 2015	TBA
While birdwatching with Cody, Frankie, and Kade in Blossom Vale, Boulder finds the golden-crested woodpeckers that were thought to be extinct. When news of this reaches Mayor Luskey where he plans to take advantage of this with visiting birdwatchers, the Rescue Bots and the Burns family must protect the golden-crested woodpeckers at any cost.
75	25	"More Than Meets the Eye"	Kevin Altieri	Gregory Bonsignore	May 30, 2015	TBA
Doc Greene's sister Maura the Magnificent, who is also a magician, pays a visit to Griffin Rock as an injured Chase works to uncover many mysteries. Chase finds that Maura is unaware that her new assistants are Myles and Evan who are using Maura's invisible cloaks to commit their latest crime spree.
76	26	"I Have Heard the Robots Singing"	Frank Squillace	Brian Hohlfeld and Nicole Dubuc	June 6, 2015	TBA
During the auditions for Griffin Rock Idol and the Rescue Bots' broadcast to the Rescue Bots' new recruits, everyone on Griffin Rock starts singing thanks to Doc's new invention called the Tone-O-Tuner after an accident with Huxley Prescott's van where Priscilla Pynch placed the Tone-O-Tuner she took to improve her singing. Near the climax of the episode, the Burns family roll to the rescue by singing a remix of their theme song.
77	27	"Now and Then"	Kevin Altieri	Greg Johnson	June 13, 2015	TBA
Griffin Rock's time capsule is about to be dug up at the same time when Woodrow comes to visit. Griffin Rock does its disappearing act to the Arctic Circle with the Quantum Crystal being found in the time capsule getting struck by lightning and exposing it to the Reactilyne. Meanwhile, Woodrow's ship sinks in the storm and he meets High Tide, Blurr, and Salvage upon being saved by them.
78	28	"Today and Forever"	Nathan Chew	Nicole Dubuc	June 13, 2015	TBA
The Burns family, Doc Greene, and the Rescue Bots must do everything they can to restore Griffin Rock back to Maine's coast. Meanwhile, Woodrow, Optimus Prime, High Tide, Blurr, and Salvage work to clear the hole that was left by Griffin Rock's unexpected teleportation.

=== Season 4 (2016) ===
On March 31, 2015, Discovery Family announced via press release that the series was renewed for a fourth season.

No. overall	No. in season	Title	Directed by	Written by	Original release date	US viewers (millions)
79	1	"New Normal"	Kevin Altieri	Nicole Dubuc	April 23, 2016	TBA
Three years after the end of season 3, an alien attack by the Velgrox forces the Rescue Bots to expose themselves to the citizens of Griffin Rock.
80	2	"Bridge Building"	Patrick Archibald	Brian Hohlfeld	April 23, 2016	TBA
A GroundBridge malfunction splits the entire Rescue Bots team apart. Meanwhile, the inhabitants of Griffin Rock decide if they should let the Rescue Bots live amongst them or not.
81	3	"Arrivals"	Frank Squillace	Nicole Dubuc	April 30, 2016	TBA
Frankie must deal with a new presence in her family: her new baby half-sister CeCe. Meanwhile, the Rescue Bots receive a new arrival in the form of Quickshadow.
82	4	"Plus One"	Kevin Altieri	Brian Hohlfeld	May 7, 2016	TBA
Quickshadow disrupts the leadership of the Rescue Bots team when Heatwave allows her a chance to lead the team.
83	5	"Back to Virtual Reality"	Patrick Archibald	Zac Atkinson	May 14, 2016	TBA
While playing a virtual reality game called "Element Quest 2.0", Cody and the Rescue Bots team search for a way to save the real Griffin Rock from being destroyed by a virtual version of Dr. Morocco.
84	6	"Vanishing Returns"	Frank Squillace	Claire Yorita Lee	May 21, 2016	TBA
Cody tries to deal with being left out while the Rescue Bots team are in a difficult position with a group of vacation resort investors that were invited to Griffin Rock by Madeline Pynch.
85	7	"Ghost in the Machine"	Kevin Altieri	Len Uhley	May 28, 2016	TBA
On Early Halloween night, Myles and Evan carjack Quickshadow and threaten to expose the secret of the Rescue Bots.
86	8	"Enemy of My Enemy"	Patrick Archibald	Nicole Dubuc	June 4, 2016	TBA
In order to save the Rescue Bots from danger at the hands of Lord Thurston Chumley, the Burns family turns to Colonel Quint Quarry for help.: NOTE: Introduces Lord Thurston Chumley, a villain based on a character of the same name from The Transformers.
87	9	"Mayor May Not"	Frank Squillace	Dean Stefan	June 11, 2016	TBA
Things get very complicated when Chase is elected as the new mayor of Griffin Rock.
88	10	"All Spark Day"	Kevin Altieri	Kim Beyer-Johnson	June 18, 2016	TBA
During All Spark Day, the Rescue Bots have a difficult time taking care of an overtired baby when CeCe Greene is actually grown to giant size.
89	11	"Part Time Heroes"	Patrick Archibald	Gregory Bonsignore	June 25, 2016	TBA
Cody and the Rescue Bots team work very hard at different part-time jobs to replace Griffin Rock's communication tower.
90	12	"The More Things Change..."	Frank Squillace	Zac Atkinson	July 2, 2016	TBA
Cody and the Rescue Bots team have a difficult time with the Mainland Training Center.
91	13	"The More Things Stay the Same"	Kevin Altieri	Brian Hohlfeld	July 9, 2016	TBA
Cody and the Rescue Bots team attempt to save the Mainland Training Center from being discovered.
92	14	"Hot Rod Bot"	Patrick Archibald	Jackson Grant and Shannon McKain	July 23, 2016	TBA
Dani helps Blurr find a balance between being a winning race car and being a working member of the Rescue Bots team.
93	15	"King Burns"	Frank Squillace	Doug Molitor	July 30, 2016	TBA
While helping Woodrow save some gorillas from danger, Chief Charlie Burns learns that their sons are heirs to Griffin Rock's kingdom.
94	16	"Pizza Pi Party"	Kevin Altieri	Carin Davis	August 6, 2016	TBA
Doc Greene's new yeast invention causes trouble at Griffin Rock's Pizza Pi Festival.
95	17	"Uninvited Guest"	Patrick Archibald	Kevin Burke and Chris "Doc" Wyatt	August 13, 2016	TBA
When Bumblebee makes an unexpected appearance at the Rescue Bots Training Center, it causes problems for the Rescue Bot team in the form of an Energon Eater.: NOTE: Features Will Friedle as the voice of Bumblebee.
96	18	"Camp Cody"	Frank Squillace	Kim Beyer-Johnson	August 27, 2016	TBA
Graham and Cody disguise Blades while helping him participate in a Lad Pioneer ceremony at Camp Itsa Craftsee where it is run by a woman named Chickadee.
97	19	"Once Upon a Time"	Kevin Altieri	Gregory Bonsignore	September 3, 2016	TBA
Cody and the Rescue Bots attempt to solve the mystery of the falling Griffin Spruces.
98	20	"The Need for Speed"	Patrick Archibald	Mairghread Scott	September 10, 2016	TBA
Blurr's future as a Rescue Bot becomes very complicated when the Mini-Con criminal Bounce arrives in Griffin Rock with Sideswipe in hot pursuit.: NOTE: Features Sideswipe from Transformers: Robots in Disguise.
99	21	"Cody's 11"	Frank Squillace	Joseph Kuhr	September 17, 2016	TBA
Cody, the Burns family and the Rescue Bots risk life and limb to save both stolen technology from Madeline Pynch and the Energon which she has turned into batteries.
100	22	"A Brush with Danger"	Frank Squillace	Dean Stefan	October 1, 2016	TBA
A no-good movie star Murray Dorfhauser arrives at Griffin Rock for his next "Maven Danger" film as his stunt double Skip Scobble secretly causes trouble for Cody and the Rescue Bots by targeting rare books.
101	23	"To Infinity...and Back"	Kevin Altieri	Zac Atkinson	October 8, 2016	TBA
Cody and the Rescue Bots find a way to bring Dani back from her unscheduled test flight in space in the Echinoderm One.
102	24	"Family Business"	Patrick Archibald	Brian Hohlfeld	October 15, 2016	TBA
Cody rides along with each of the Bots to decide what kind of rescue worker he wants to be -- but when a member of his family is in danger, Cody's true calling becomes clear.
103	25	"Upgrades"	Kevin Altieri	Nicole Dubuc	October 22, 2016	TBA
While the Rescue Bots go on new missions given to them by Optimus Prime, the Morocco Virus hatches a new plan to destroy them once and for all.
104	26	"Transformations"	Patrick Archibald	Greg Johnson	October 22, 2016	TBA
The Morocco Virus uploads himself into a robot, captures Cody, and mind controls him to do Morocco's bidding (using the golden phones from season 2, episode 6) in order to destroy the Rescue Bots.
