= Definition Please =

American comedy-drama film

- Directed by: Sujata Day
- Screenplay by: Sujata Day
- Produced by: Sujata Day; Cameron Fife; Datari Turner; Ahmad Cory Jubran; Hiren C. Surti
- Starring: Sujata Day; Ritesh Rajan; Jake Choi; Lalaine; Parvesh Cheena; Tim Chiou; Katrina Bowden; LeVar Burton
- Cinematography: Brooks Ludwick
- Edited by: Emilie Aubry; Niles Howard
- Music by: Amanda Delores; Patricia Jones
- Production companies: Atajus Productions; Datari Turner Productions; June Street Productions
- Distributed by: ARRAY; Netflix
- Release dates: August 2020 (Bentonville); October 2020 (AAIFF); January 21, 2022
- Running time: 91 minutes
- Country: United States
- Language: English

Definition Please is a 2020 American comedy-drama film written, produced, directed by and starring Sujata Day. It is Day's feature directorial debut.

== Cast ==
- Sujata Day as Monica Chowdry
- Ritesh Rajan as Sonny
- Jake Choi as Richie
- Anna Khaja as Jaya
- Lalaine as Krista
- LeVar Burton as himself
- Katrina Bowden as Crystal Cane
- Eugene Byrd as Wayland Pines
- Parvesh Cheena as Jimit Uncle
- Sonal Shah as Dr. Ali
- Tim Chiou as Dr. Chiou
- Kunal Dudheker as Rahul
- Meera Simhan as Mrs. Gandhi
- Maya Kapoor as Payal

== Plot ==
A former Scripps spelling bee champion must reconcile with her estranged brother when he returns home to help care for their sick mother.

== Release ==
The film premiered in August 2020 at the Bentonville Film Festival and in October 2020 at the Asian American International Film Festival. ARRAY acquired the distribution rights to the film in the United States, Canada, United Kingdom, Australia and New Zealand, and it was released on January 21, 2022 on Netflix.

== Reception ==
Beandrea July of The Hollywood Reporter gave the film a positive review, calling it "A funny, reflective good time of a debut."
