= If That Mockingbird Don't Sing =

- Directed by: Sadie Bones
- Written by: Sadie Bones
- Starring: Aitana Doyle
- Release date: June 19, 2024 (Bentonville Film Festival)
- Running time: 95 minutes
- Country: United States
- Language: English

If That Mockingbird Don't Sing is a 2024 American comedy drama film written and directed by Sadie Bones and starring Aitana Doyle.

== Cast ==
- Nadia Dajani as Liz
- David Krumholtz as Alfonso
- Aitana Doyle as Sydnie
- Ava Bodnar as Iris
- Braxton Fannin as Lucas
- Andrew Michael Fama as Daniel
- Kevin Corrigan as Bob
- Galadriel Stineman as Nevon
- Catherine Curtin as Carrie
- Natalie Carter as Dr. Jones
- Suzanne DiDonna as Zoe
- Stuart Rudin as Father Hank
- Michael Buscemi as Immanuel Jacobs

== Release ==
The film premiered at the Bentonville Film Festival on June 19, 2024.

== Reception ==
Josh Bell of Crooked Marquee graded the film a B.

Liz Whittemore of the Alliance of Women Film Journalists gave the film a positive review and wrote, “Bones should team up with Sex Ed classes, because the way this film is crafted should scare the sh*t out of any sensible teen into respecting themselves enough not to endure the emotional abuse of a careless and immature partner.”

Fletcher Powell of KMUW also gave the film a positive review and wrote, “It's an impressive thing just to let the movie come to you when you're a young director, but Sadie Bones shows she’s got the ability.”
