= Anna Khaja =

American actress and playwright

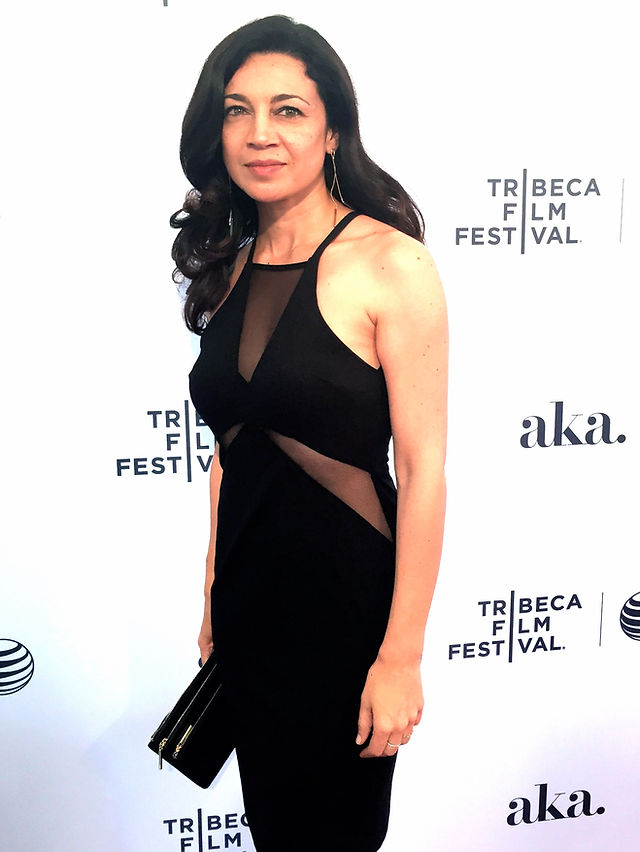
- Occupations: Actress & Playwright
- Known for: Role of Indira in The Walking Dead: World Beyond and Manisha in Good Place
- Spouse: Chris Rossi

Anna Khaja is an American actress and playwright. She is known for her roles as Indira in AMC's post-apocalyptic horror drama The Walking Dead: World Beyond, Manisha Al-Jamil in the NBC comedy series The Good Place, Sita Parrish in Quantico, and Rachel in Silicon Valley. Khaja also wrote and starred in the off-Broadway play Shaheed: The Dream and Death of Benazir Bhutto.

== Early life and education ==
Khaja attended Castro Valley High School, where she starred in theater productions such as The Diary of Anne Frank and graduated in 1992. Khaja graduated from UCLA's School of Theater, Film, and Television in 1997.

Khaja is one of the recipients of the 2020-21 Black List and Google Assistant Storytelling Fellowship.

== Career ==
After graduating, Khaja played roles in TV series such as NUMB3RS, Weeds, FlashForward, and House. She also appeared in the Mark Taper Forum's production of the play Stuff Happens by David Hare. Khaja also originated the role of Nerjas in the U.S. premiere of the play Palace of the End. She received an LA Weekly Theater Award for Solo Performance for her work in the play.

== Personal life ==
Khaja is married to screenwriter Chris Rossi.

== Filmography ==
=== Film ===
Year	Title	Role	Notes	Ref(s)			
Year	Title	Role	Notes	Ref(s)	1999	Man Woman Film	Anastasia X
2006	Yasin	Role	Amina	Short film			
2006	No. 6	Role	Milena Petrescu	Short film			
2007	King of California	Officer Contreras					
2008	Yes Man	Faranoush					
2009	Reunion	Anna					
2009	Post Grad	Juanita					
2010	Order of Chaos	Meter Maid					
2011	Admissions	Daphna	Short film				
2012	California Solo	Anna					
2014	The Pink Sorrys	Bandit Queen	Short film				
2014	Pyromance	Rose	Short film				
2014	Faith	Ouriel	Short film				
2015	How I Do Math	Anna	Short film				
2015	Meadowland	Fatimah					
2015	The Party Is Over	Rania					
2015	He Said	Dr. Miller	Short film				
2016	$hitty Job$	Boss	Short film				
2016	The Caretaker	Dr. Patel					
2016	Holy	Minister	Music video for Danielle LoPresti				
2017	Oscar	Marijuana	Short film				
2017	Surefire	Luha	Music video for John Legend				
2017	Khol	Ranjan	Short film				
2018	The Bride		Short film				
2019	Heroines		Short film				
2020	Rumble Strip	Carmen					
2020	Definition Please	Jaya					

=== Television ===
Year	Title	Role	Notes	Ref(s)			
Year	Title	Role	Notes	Ref(s)	2002	For the People	Lupe
2005	Strong Medicine	Role	ER Receptionist				
2006	NUMB3RS	Role	Saida Kafaji				
2006	Sleeper Cell	N.O.C. Agent					
2007	Weeds	Female Agent					
2008	Dirt	Nurse					
2009	FlashForward	Older Woman					
2009	Private Practice	Cooper's Lawyer					
2009	House	Dr. D'Razio					
2009	This Might Hurt		Television movie				
2010	The Real Girl's Guide to Everything Else	Aliyah					
2010	The Closer	Mrs. Mota					
2012	Bent	Dr. Patel					
2012	True Blood	Zaafira	Recurring role, 6 episodes				
2013	Criminal Minds	Francie Kendall					
2013	The Newsroom	Shanon Hammid					
2013	NCIS: Los Angeles	Talita Pambakian					
2014	The Mentalist	Ellen					
2015	The Fosters	Joan					
2015	Bones	Principal Anne Franklin					
2015–2016	Stitchers	Getti Ahluwalia	Recurring role, 5 episodes				
2015–2018	Silicon Valley	Rachel	Recurring role, 9 episodes				
2015–2018	Quantico	Sita Parrish	Recurring role, 6 episodes				
2016	Conviction	Kadisha Abdullah					
2016	Elementary	Nazria Durrani					
2016	Powerhouse	Maxine Mazari					
2016–2020	The Good Place	Manisha Al-Jamil	Recurring role, 5 episodes				
2017	The Good Fight	Zeinah Abdoulafia					
2017	Training Day	Kathy Meyers					
2017	Shooter	Gabina	Recurring role, 2 episodes				
2017–2019	Madam Secretary	Amina Salah	Recurring role, 3 episodes				
2018	S.W.A.T.	Agent Abby DuBois					
2018	Shameless	Doctor Padma Singh					
2018–2019	For the People	Vera Simmons	Recurring role, 4 episodes				
2018–2019	Lethal Weapon	Senator Donna Malick	Recurring role, 2 episodes				
2019	Last Seen	Kat	Web series				
2019	Brooklyn Nine-Nine	Theresa Moore					
2019	NCIS	Eliza Hutchins					
2019	The Boys	Lydia Parker					
2020	FBI: Most Wanted	Yara Mahmoud					
2020	FBI	Yara Mahmoud					
2020	Tommy	Rima Fayed					
2020	The Baker and the Beauty	Betsi					
2021	The Resident	Himaya Pravesh					
2021	The Walking Dead: World Beyond	Indira	Recurring Role, 7 Episodes				
2021	The Sex Lives of College Girls	Professor Levin					
2022	The Blacklist	Helen Maghi	Episode: "Helen Maghi (No. 172)"				
2022	The Lincoln Lawyer	Dr. Miriam Arslanian					
2022	The Young and the Restless	Dr. Malone					
