= Nadia Dajani =

American actress (born 1965)

- Born: December 26, 1965 (age 60)
- Occupation: Actress
- Years active: 1990–present

Nadia Dajani (born December 26, 1965) is an American actress. She hosts the baseball comedy web series Caught Off Base with Nadia.

== Early life and education ==
Dajani attended I.S. 70 junior high school in New York City with fellow actor Liev Schreiber.

== Acting career ==
From 1995 to 1997, Dajani starred as Amanda Moyer in the Fox sitcom Ned & Stacey for two seasons. She starred in numerous television pilots. She appeared on Emily's Reasons Why Not opposite Heather Graham and the Adult Swim cult hit Delocated, as well as successful appearances on Aaron Sorkin projects such as Tina Lake on Sports Night and as the First Lady's Chief of Staff, Lily Mays, on The West Wing.

Dajani has appeared in a variety of television episodes on such shows as Sex and the City ("Critical Condition") and its prequel The Carrie Diaries (where she played a completely different, yet more major, role), Ugly Betty, The King of Queens, Body of Proof, Curb Your Enthusiasm, and Law & Order: Special Victims Unit, and starred in the CBS film The Lost Valentine alongside Betty White. She played Gerry Red Wilson's sister-in-law Catherine in ABC's That's Life in 1998. She had a recurring role on the Showtime series The Big C.

She has had roles in films such as This Is Not a Film, Flirting with Disaster, Happy Accidents, View from the Top, and the Edward Burns' film Sidewalks of New York.

Dajani is a founding member of Malaparte Theatre Company, whose artistic director was Ethan Hawke. In 1993 she appeared alongside Calista Flockhart, Ethan Hawke, Steve Zahn in an off-Broadway play, Sophistry. In 2002 Dajani appeared as Bev in Tom Donaghy's Boys and Girls.

She sings backing vocals on Jimmy Fallon's album The Bathroom Wall. Dajani appears in Brady Kiernan's 2011 romantic drama film Stuck Between Stations, alongside Josh Hartnett and Michael Imperioli. She had a recurring role on USA Network's Necessary Roughness. In 2011, Dajani appeared in the Body of Proof episode "Society Hill". The following year, she guest-starred in an episode of the CBS series The Good Wife.

== Personal life ==
Dajani is an avid baseball fan. She created and starred in a baseball comedy web series titled Caught Off Base with Nadia (2010–2013).

== Filmography ==
Film
Year	Title	Role	Notes
1996	Flirting with Disaster	Jill	
1996	Breathing Room	Claire	
1997	Tupperware Party	Becca	Short film
1997	Dinner and Driving	Samantha	
1999	Seven Girlfriends	Naomi	
2000	Happy Accidents	Gretchen	
2001	Sidewalks of New York	Hilary	
2002	Balkanization	Nadia Harding	Short film
2002	You Stupid Man	Jasmine	
2003	This Is Not a Film	Nadia / Grace / Patty	
2003	View from the Top	Paige	
2005	Game 6	Renee Simons	
2005	Alchemy	Jane	
2008	Gone to the Dogs	Bianca	Short film
2009	Bob Funk	Jean	
2010	A Little Help	Angela Behar	
2011	Stuck Between Stations	Sheila	
2014	Take Care	Fallon	
2014	The Opposite Sex	Nancy	
2019	Almost Love	Nurse Hame	
2024	If That Mockingbird Don't Sing	Liz	Film festivals only

Television
Year	Title	Role	Notes
1990	CBS Schoolbreak Special	Nancy	Episode: "Flour Babies"
1991	A Woman Named Jackie	Christina Onassis	Miniseries, main cast
1995–1997	Ned & Stacey	Amanda Moyer	Main cast, cancelled and pulled from broadcast middle of season 2
1997	Dellaventura	Marybeth Fallon	Episode: "Joe Fallon's Daughter"
1998	That's Life	Catherine	Main cast, cancelled and pulled from broadcast after 5 episodes
1998	Conrad Bloom	—N/a	Episode: "Pilot"
1999	The King of Queens	Sophia	Episode: "Maybe Baby"
1999	Sports Night	Tina Lake	Episode: "Kyle Whitaker's Got Two Sacks"
1999	Oh, Grow Up	Emily	Episode: "Duckboy Flies Again"
2000	The West Wing	Lilli Mays	Episode: "The White House Pro-Am"
2000	The King of Queens	Lisa	Episode: "Class Struggle"
2000	Welcome to New York	Cathy	Episode: "It's Hard to Meet Intelligent Women"
2002	Sex and the City	Nina Katz	Episode: "Critical Condition"
2002	MDs	—N/a	Episode: "Time of Death"
2006	Emily's Reasons Why Not	Reilly Harvey	Main cast, 1 episode, then cancelled and pulled from broadcast
2006	Law & Order	Ellie Harper	Episode: "Public Service Homicide"
2007	Curb Your Enthusiasm	Paula	Episode: "The Bat Mitzvah"
2009–2010	Delocated	Susan	Main cast (seasons 1–2)
2009	Sherri	Tonya	Episode: "There Is No 'I' in Church"
2009–2010	Ugly Betty	Denise Ludwig	2 episodes
2010–2011	The Big C	Tina	4 episodes
2011	Body of Proof	Lauren Matthews	Episode: "Society Hill"
2011	Necessary Roughness	Margo Ciccero	3 episodes
2011	The Lost Valentine	Julie Oliver	TV movie
2012	The Good Wife	Sara Gardner	Episode: "After the Fall"
2012	Delocated	Mom	Episode: "Reunion Show"
2012	Suits	Elaine Cohen	Episode: "The Choice"
2013	The Carrie Diaries	Deb	Recurring role
2013	Law & Order: Special Victims Unit	Officer Ryan Quinn	Episode: "Internal Affairs"
2014, 2016	Elementary	Dr. Grannis	Episode: "Rip Off"
2015	2 Broke Girls	Marie Prower	2 episodes
2015	Younger	Megyn Vernoff	Episode: "Hot Mitzvah"
2016	Odd Mom Out	Amy	Episode: "The High Road"
2016–2019	Jon Glaser Loves Gear	Dr. Ellen Trammell	Recurring role
2017	Girlfriends' Guide to Divorce	Linda	4 episodes
2018	Bull	Thalia Macera	Episode: "Survival Instincts"
2021–2023	The Other Two	Mackenzie	Recurring role (seasons 2–3)
2023–2025	Power Book III: Raising Kanan	Teresa Boselli	3 episodes
2024	Elsbeth	Wendy Wexler	Episode: "Reality Shock"
2026	Best Medicine	Gina Marie Afragola	Episode: "Breakin' in Is Hard to Do"

Web
Year	Title	Role	Notes
2011	Paul the Male Matchmaker	Maureen	2 episodes
