= Happy Accidents (film) =

2000 American science fiction romantic comedy film

- Theatrical release poster
- Directed by: Brad Anderson
- Written by: Brad Anderson
- Produced by: Caroline Kaplan
- Starring: Vincent D'Onofrio; Marisa Tomei; Nadia Dajani; Richard Portnow; Anthony Michael Hall; Holland Taylor
- Cinematography: Terry Stacey
- Edited by: Brad Anderson
- Music by: Evan Lurie
- Distributed by: IFC Films
- Release dates: January 25, 2000 (Sundance); August 24, 2001 (United States)
- Running time: 110 minutes
- Country: United States
- Language: English

Happy Accidents is a 2000 American science fiction romantic comedy film starring Marisa Tomei and Vincent D'Onofrio. The film follows Ruby Weaver, a New York City woman with a string of failed relationships, and Sam Deed, a man who claims to be from the year 2470. The film was shot almost entirely in Brooklyn, New York.

== Plot ==
Ruby Weaver is weary of her long history of failed relationships with men when she meets Sam Deed in a park. But after the two fall in love, Ruby becomes suspicious of Sam's past, his obsession with a "Chrystie Delancey", and "causal effect". Under pressure from her, he finally explains that he is really from the year 2470 and is what he calls a "back traveler". Ruby initially ignores this story, but after Sam's persistence, she begins to wonder. She takes him to see her therapist Meg Ford. Ruby becomes worried as to Sam's sanity when he reveals that everything he has done was a deliberate attempt to change her life. In the end, both Deed and Ford turn out to be time travelers and the fatal accident that would have killed Ruby is avoided.

== Cast ==
- Marisa Tomei as Ruby Weaver
- Vincent D'Onofrio as Sam Deed
- Nadia Dajani as Gretchen
- Holland Taylor as Maggie Ann "Meg" Ford
- José Zúñiga as Jose
- Richard Portnow as Trip
- Sean Gullette as Mark
- Tamara Jenkins as Robin
- Sam Seder as Ned
- Tovah Feldshuh as Lillian Weaver
- Anthony Michael Hall as Himself
- Larry Fessenden as Junkie
- Michael McGlone as Tab

== Reception ==
Happy Accidents was first shown at the Sundance Film Festival on January 25, 2000. The film later opened in limited release on August 24, 2001 to 2 screens in New York City, New York earning $14,840 on its opening weekend, and (the weekend before 9/11) reaching a widest release of 49 screens and grossing a total of $688,523 domestically in the United States.

On the review aggregator website Rotten Tomatoes, 69% of 62 critics' reviews are positive. The website's consensus reads: "Happy Accidents has enough quirkiness and charm to rise above the more formulaic entries in the romantic comedy genre." Metacritic, which uses a weighted average, assigned the film a score of 60 out of 100, based on 22 critics, indicating "mixed or average" reviews.

In his review of the film Roger Ebert describes it as being "essentially silliness crossed with science fiction", giving the film a rating of 3 out of 4 stars. Ebert's co-host on Ebert & Roeper, Richard Roeper, ranked it #8 on his top ten films of the year list.
