= Gregory Bonsignore =

American dramatist

Gregory Bonsignore (born 1983) is an American playwright, television program creator, director for theatre, television and film, producer, novelist, musical theatre librettist and lyricist, screenwriter, comedian and actor.

== Life and career ==
Bonsignore grew up in Houston, Texas. He earned his bachelor's degree in storytelling at New York University, trained at the BBC in London, and is a graduate of The "BMI Lehman Engel Musical Theatre Workshop".

Bonsignore was Playwright in Residence at The Library of Alexandria in Egypt. His play "A Derbyshire Pub Quiz", a collaboration with Cultural Geographer George Jaramillo on Imagined Landscapes, premiered at The Royal Geographical Society's Annual Conference in Exeter, September 2015. And a Director in Residence at the Director's Lab in Beirut - an extension of the Lincoln Center Directors' Workshop.

Off-Broadway, he wrote the Book and Lyrics for the musical Atomic, behind the scenes of The Manhattan Project, (World-Premiere in Sydney - Winner Best Musical, Australia), Three (Clurman Theatre, Sam French Prize finalist), premiere at City Theatre's Best American Shorts Festival - Miami, and wrote book/lyrics & directed "Gorgonzola: A Cautionary Sicilian Tale" a new musical, that premiered Off-Broadway in 2016, and won Best Musical, Best Music and Best Lyrics, Best Actor & Best Actress - more than any show in the festival's history. Most recently his Broadway workshop of The Talented Mr. Ripley was selected for development by Stephen Schwartz in his ASCAP Workshop.

During Covid, Bonsignore drove emergency vehicles for The Red Cross. In 2020, Bonsignore was deputy director for Michigan's Get Out the Vote campaign, where Grand Rapids' historically-Republican Kent County flipped Democratic, and again in Georgia for the 2021 Senate Run-Off Election. And again in 2024, in Maryland for the senate campaign of Angela Alsobrooks, making history as the state's first Black senator.

Bonsignore created the critically acclaimed cult comedy series Squad 85 (for Executive Producer Justin Lin), Writer/Director of the satirical film "...or Die" (Best Short - HBO Film Festival), credited as a writer for "The Webby Awards" and "Side by Side with Susan Blackwell", worked for three years in NYC as a stand-up, and worked on many TV series, including Transformers: Rescue Bots, Homeland, Lie to Me, Three Rivers, In Plain Sight, Hustle, and a musical episode of My Little Pony: Friendship Is Magic - voted by fans as their Favorite Episode of the Series

His feature, for Oprah Winfrey's HARPO Films - "Can You Tell Me How" about Sesame Street Creator Joan Ganz Cooney and Jim Henson was selected for The Black List. His children's illustrated book, "That's Betty: The Story of Betty White" was sold to Henry Holt and Company for a Fall 2021 release, and banned in Florida. The book follows a boy tasked with doing a presentation on a trailblazing woman, and for him, there's only one choice: Betty White. He gets a helping hand from a certain pioneer and icon who happens to be in the library on the same day.

== Books ==
- An Island of An Island (In Development)
- That's Betty (Henry Holt, 2021)
- The Nothing We Know (Adaptive, 2016)

== Theatre ==
- The Talented Mr. Ripley (In Development)
- Raul Julia Is Dead (Reading, 2021)
- Gorgonzola (2016)
- Atomic (2014)

== Film ==
=== Screenwriting ===
- Drawn That Way (In Development)
- Can You Tell Me How (2018)

=== Director ===
- American Cheese (Documentary) (In Production)
- Or Die (Short) (2012)

== Television ==
=== Screenwriting ===
- My Little Pony: Friendship Is Magic (2018)
- The Academy (Pilot) (2016)
- Transformers: Rescue Bots (2015–2016)
- Squad 85 (2012)
- Lie to Me (2010)

=== Director ===
- Squad 85 (2012)

=== Producer ===
- Squad 85 (2012)
- Hustle (2007): production assistant
- Chasing Farrah (2005): production coordinator

=== Script coordinator ===
- Homeland (2013)
- Bunheads (2013)
- Lie to Me (2010–2011)
- Three Rivers (2009–2010)
- In Plain Sight (2009)
