= Galadriel Stineman =

American actress and model

- Born: Cincinnati, Ohio, U.S.
- Education: Northern Kentucky University
- Occupations: Actress, model
- Years active: 2009–present
- Spouse: Kevin Joy
- Children: 2

Galadriel Stineman is an American actress and model. She is best known for her roles as Gwen Tennyson in Ben 10: Alien Swarm and as Cassidy Finch in The Middle. In 2015, Stineman was cast as one of eight playable characters, Ashley Brown, in an interactive drama horror game, Until Dawn, developed by Supermassive Games.

== Early life ==
Stineman was born in Cincinnati and named after the character Galadriel in The Lord of the Rings, which her mother read while pregnant. She graduated from Newport Central Catholic High School, in Newport, Kentucky in 2002. She was a cheerleader, dancer and horseback rider, and also participated in drama club while at school.

She grew up in Northern Kentucky, where her father was a tennis player as well as a teacher and her mother, a nurse. She then attended Northern Kentucky University. As a very involved undergrad, she was president of Delta Zeta sorority, vice president of student government and named "Outstanding Senior of the Year". It was during her time at NKU that she became involved in student films and eventually signed with a couple local talent agencies to pick up extra money. She graduated magna cum laude in 2007 from the College of Informatics.

== Career ==
Stineman moved to Los Angeles after graduation and made her debut in Fame (2009) as a dancer. Her breakthrough came when she portrayed Gwen Tennyson in Ben 10: Alien Swarm (2009), a science fiction action film by Alex Winter based on the Cartoon Network animated series Ben 10: Alien Force. She was the second actress to play the part of Gwen. Stineman had been involved in major projects since 2009. She played Audra in Junkyard Dog (2010) and Cassidy in The Middle (2012–14). She also provided the voice and motion capture for Ashley Brown in the Sony Interactive Entertainment video game Until Dawn (2015).

== Personal life ==
Stineman is married to actor Kevin Joy and they have two sons, Atticus and Sawyer.

== Filmography ==
=== Film ===
Year	Title	Role	Notes
2009	Fame	Dancer	
2009	Ben 10: Alien Swarm	Gwen Tennyson	
2010	Junkyard Dog	Audra	
2011	Betrayed at 17	Brooke Brandeis	Television film
2012	Walking the Halls	Emma	
2012	Operation Cupcake	Kim Carson	
2012	The 4 to 9ers	Beth	Television film
2013	Plan C	Girl	Short film
2014	Knock Knock	Hanna	Short film
2015	Man Up	Madison	
2015	The Party Is Over	Sarah	
2017	A Moving Romance	Lily	Television film
2018	Runaway Romance	Sarah Miller	Television film
2018	The Art of Murder	Casey	Television film
2019	Blowing Up Right Now	Beth	
2019	The Teleios Act	Sarah / Mrs. Teleios	Short film
2020	Follow Your Heart	Kathy Yoder	Television film
2022	Plus One at an Amish Wedding	Dr. April Monroe	Television film
2022	Hot Take: The Depp/Heard Trial	Tess	
2022	Murder, Anyone?	Bridgette	
2022	The Christmas Challenge	Michale	
2023	Night Train	Commercial Actress	
2023	LaRoy, Texas	Angie	
2023	Hometown Remedy	Dr. Adele Clark	Television film
2024	Darkness of Man	Dana	
2024	If That Mockingbird Don't Sing	Nevon	
2025	Sugarcreek Amish Mysteries: Blessings in Disguise	Cheryl Cooper	Television film

=== Television ===
Year	Title	Role	Notes
2011	True Blood	Joyce Watney	2 episodes
2011–2014, 2017	The Middle	Cassidy Finch / Lucy Howard	Recurring role (seasons 4–5), guest (seasons 3 and 8); 13 episodes
2012	Community	Woman with Baby	Episode: "Digital Estate Planning"
2012	Good Luck Charlie	Molly	Episode: "Team Mom"
2012	Bones	Brooke Guminski	Episode: "The Method in the Madness"
2013	Shameless	Wendy	Episode: "The Helpful Gallaghers"
2013	Austin & Ally	Didi Wade	Episode: "Family & Feuds"
2014	Glee	Vanessa	Episode: "Tested"
2015	Major Crimes	Lisa Sloan	Episode: "Turn Down"
2015	Rizzoli & Isles	Krista	Episode: "Love Taps"
2016	NCIS: Los Angeles	Jessica Moore	Episode: "Angels & Daemons"
2017	Law & Order True Crime	Annie	Miniseries
2019	9-1-1	Nina Sutton	Episode: "Broken"
2019	The Kids Are Alright	Fiona	2 episodes
2019	This Is Us	Donna	Episode: "The Club"
2022	NCIS	Sierra Kruger	Episode: "First Steps"
2024	Georgie & Mandy's First Marriage	Cynthia	Episode: "A Regular Samaritan"

=== Video games ===
Year	Title	Role	Notes
2015, 2024	Until Dawn	Ashley "Ash" Brown	Voice and motion capture
