= Blowing Up Right Now =

- Directed by: Tom Morris
- Written by: Chris Lee Hill
- Produced by: Tom Morris; Chris Lee Hill; Jaz Kalkat; Tyler MacIntyre; Aaron Webman
- Starring: Sujata Day; Danny Jolles; Maria Blasucci; Corey Sorenson; Galadriel Stineman
- Cinematography: Brooks Ludwick
- Edited by: Tyler MacIntyre
- Music by: Russ Howard III
- Production companies: Tomkat Films; Infinite Lives Entertainment
- Release date: June 15, 2019
- Running time: 84 minutes
- Country: United States
- Language: English

Blowing Up Right Now is a 2019 American adventure romantic comedy film written by Chris Lee Hill, directed by Tom Morris and starring Sujata Day, Danny Jolles, Maria Blasucci, Corey Sorenson and Galadriel Stineman.

== Cast ==
- Danny Jolles as Shep
- Sujata Day as Mandy
- Maria Blasucci as Kim
- Corey Jantzen as Nick
- Galadriel Stineman as Beth
- Kelli Maroney as Ruth
- Pete Gardner as John
- Corey Sorenson as Fred Marzulla

== Release ==
The film was released on June 15, 2019.

== Reception ==
Caryn James of The Hollywood Reporter gave the film a negative review, calling it "painless and pleasant enough to watch, but there’s nothing to set this comedy above a gazillion other, fresher works streaming all around us."

Nick Rocco Scalia of Film Threat rated the film an 8 out of 10 and wrote, "this smart, fun, heartfelt little indie film deserves to blow up, right now."
