= Sujata Day =

American actress

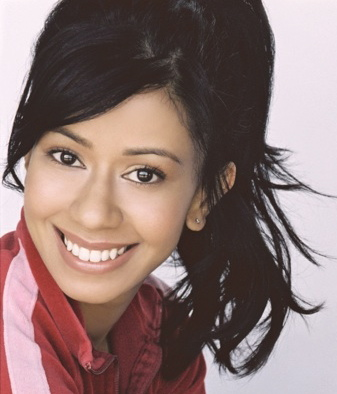
- Born: Sujata Choudhury; June 27, 1984 (age 42); Greensburg, Pennsylvania, United States
- Other name: Sujata Ray
- Occupations: Actress, model, screenwriter

Sujata Choudhury (born June 27, 1984), credited professionally as Sujata Day, is an American actress, model and screenwriter. She is best known for her roles as CeeCee in the Issa Rae web series, The Misadventures of Awkward Black Girl (2011-2013) and Sarah in Insecure. Day made her directorial debut with the 2020 comedy-drama, Definition Please.

== Early life ==
Day is of Bengali descent. The daughter of an Indian-born mechanical engineer and a housewife, Day became involved in the performing arts at a very young age. She was involved with dance (ballet, jazz, modern, hip hop, and East Indian folk and classical dance) and later with acting, singing and musical theater. Of her childhood, she has stated that if she had seen more Brown representation on television, she might have had more inspiration to pursue a career in the arts. She nevertheless studied the arts and performed in school and community productions before pursueing a professional acting career in Hollywood.

== Career ==
Day has appeared in a wide variety of television shows such as The Secret Life of the American Teenager, Campus Ladies, Buffy the Vampire Slayer, 7th Heaven, Greek, and The Loop. In 2007, she played a supporting role in the Warner Bros.-produced Sublime. She can be seen alongside Danny Glover and Snoop Doggy Dogg in the independent film Down for Life which premiered to rave reviews at the 2009 Toronto International Film Festival.

In 2009 she appeared in the horror/comedy film The Last Lovecraft: Relic of Cthulhu, which screened at the 2010 Slamdance Film Festival.

She starred as CeCe in the Issa Rae-created web comedy series The Misadventures of Awkward Black Girl. She continued her work with Rae on the HBO series, Insecure.

In 2017, Day wrote, produced, directed and starred in a film called Cowboy and Indian, to be developed into a television series.

On May 30, 2019, it was announced that Day will direct a film called Definition Please, for which she also wrote the script. It stars Ritesh Rajan and Jake Choi and was shot on location in Day's hometown of Greensburg, Pennsylvania in the summer of 2019.

== Filmography ==
=== Film ===
Year	Title	Role	Notes
2004	Weapon of Mass Destruction	The Virgin	
2006	Alien Secrets	Leena Gupita	Video
2007	Sublime	Quechan Indian Girl	Video
2008	Extremely Hermosa	Jugadamba	Short
2009	Struggle	Park Girl	Short
2009	Down for Life	Melissa	
2009	The Last Lovecraft: Relic of Cthulhu	Stacy Rahman	
2011	Big Breakin'	Vanessa	Short
2012	Nesting	Sasha	
2012	Directing Reality	TV Reporter	Short
2013	Wallflower	Herself	Short
2014	Facebook Fatigue	Single Girl	Short
2014	Words with Girls	Ari	TV movie
2015	Hello Again	Sophie	Short
2016	9 Rides	Sleepy Woman	
2016	Tiny House	Priya	TV movie
2017	20 Weeks	Ruby	
2017	Parts	Herself	Short
2017	A Little Bit Pregnant	Amina	Short
2017	Since We've Been Apart	Brielle	Short
2017	Cowboy and Indian	Indian	Short
2018	Wrong Side of 25	Katie	Short
2018	Killing Diaz	Claire	
2018	Lemonade	Liz	Short
2018	Ganja Mama	Sunita	Short
2018	The Homestay	Nina	Short
2018	Revenge Tour	Jamila	TV Short
2018	Bender	Reveler	Video Short
2018	Leadwell	Liz	Short
2018	Bull Mountain Lookout	Erin	Short
2019	Blowing Up Right Now	Mandy	
2019	Ring Ring	Marion	
2019	Signal	Amy	Short
2019	Bill, the Alien	Mya	Short
2020	The Bellman	Stacey	
2020	aTypical Wednesday	Heather	
2020	Death of a Telemarketer	Shelly	
2020	Definition Please	Monica Chowdry	
2021	For the Hits	Layla	
TBA	Thud †		Post-production

=== Television ===
Year	Title	Role	Notes
2003	Russians in the City of Angels	Tiffany	Episode: "Papa"
2003	Buffy the Vampire Slayer	Shy Girl	Episode: "Storyteller"
2004	The Tonight Show with Jay Leno	East Indian Girl	Episode: "Episode # 12.69"
2006	7th Heaven	Student #1	Episode: "Got MLK"
2006	The Underground	Dancer	-
2007	Campus Ladies	Hot Girl	Episode: "Foreign Policy"
2007	The Loop	Veronica	Episode: "Lady Business"
2007	Greek	College Student #2	Episode: "Depth Perception"
2009	The Secret Life of the American Teenager	Student #1	Episode: "Ciao"
2010	Desperate Housewives	Dancer	Episode: "You Gotta Get a Gimmick"
2010	Raveena and the Vampire	Raveena	Main cast
2011–13	Awkward Black Girl	CeCe	Main cast
2012–13	The Guild	Sula Morrison	Main cast: season 6
2013	Sistah Did What?	Agent	Episode: "The Best View Is the Rear View"
2013	The Slutty Years	Cats Girl	Episode: "Party"
2013	Arrested Development	Flight Attendant #2	Episode: "A New Start"
2013	True Friendship Society	Bestie	Episode: "Pilot Part 1 & 2"
2013	Little Horribles	Sad Sack	Episode: "Spinning"
2014	Naked Problems	Jessie	Main cast
2014	Don't Talk in the Kitchen Presents	Sujata	Episode: "Justin Bieber: Never Say N@Gger"
2014–16	Larry & Lucy	Lucy	Main cast
2015	Big Breakin'	Vanessa	Main cast
2015	The Grinder	Dawn	Episode: "A Hero Has Fallen"
2015	Namaste, Bitches	Trina	Episode: "High Low Flow"
2015	Unfollowers	Sujata	Main cast
2015	Get Your Life	Lady in Blackish	Episode: "Girl Get Your Blackish"
2016	Smoky Knights	Erika	Episode: "Everyone Gets Seth Laid"
2016	Brian Remus: Science Genius	Lindsey	Episode: "Mister Butters"
2016–21	Insecure	Sarah	Recurring cast: season 1-3, guest: season 5
2017	Life in Pieces	Hostess	Episode: "#TBT: Y2K Sophia Honeymoon Critter"
2017	Brooklyn Nine-Nine	Sarah	Episode: "Serve & Protect"
2018	Dell: Tales of Transformation	-	Episode: "Rio Grande Steams Into the Future"
2018	Solve	Julia	Episode: "Deal With the Devil"
2019	I Think You Should Leave with Tim Robinson	Laura	Episode: "It's the Cigars You Smoke That Are Going to Give You Cancer"

=== Video games ===
Year	Title	Role	Notes
2019	NBA 2K20	Stacy Gibralto	MyCAREER Story

=== Production ===
Year	Title	Role	Notes
2003	An American Idol Christmas	Script coordinator	Television film
2010	Raveena and the Vampire	Writer, producer	2 episodes
2011	Wallflower	Writer, director, producer	Short film
2014–15	Larry & Lucy	Writer, executive producer	3 episodes
2015	Big Breaking'	Executive producer	5 episodes
2015	Unfollowers	Producer	
