= That's Life (1998 TV series) =

- Genre: Sitcom
- Created by: Eric Gilliland; Brian Burns
- Directed by: Michael Lembeck; Robin Bextor
- Starring: Gerry Red Wilson; Kellie Overbey; Nadia Dajani; Ron Livingston; Pauley Perrette
- Composers: Mark McAdam; Jonathan Wolff; Paul Buckley
- Country of origin: United States
- Original language: English
- No. of seasons: 1
- No. of episodes: 5 (plus 1 unaired)

Production
- Executive producers: Eric Gilliland; Sid Youngers
- Producer: Lisa Albert
- Production companies: Eric Gilliland Productions; 20th Century Fox Television

Original release
- Network: ABC
- Release: March 10 – April 7, 1998

That's Life is an American television sitcom that premiered March 10, 1998, on ABC. The series is about a blue-collar family living in Queens. It was cancelled by ABC after only a little more than a month, airing its final episode on April 7, 1998, leaving one episode unaired.

== Summary ==
Mike is head of the meat department at the supermarket. He has been married to Patty for ten years, and the two live in their own duplex in Queens. Patty's sister Catherine and her son Kieran move into the apartment above Mike and Patty. Lisa is Patty's college-aged sister, and Mitch is Mike's best friend.

== Cast ==
- Gerry Red Wilson as Mike
- Kellie Overbey as Patty
- Nadia Dajani as Catherine
- Ron Livingston as Mitch
- Pauley Perrette as Lisa
- Michael Charles Roman as Kieran

== Episodes ==
| No. | Title | Directed by | Written by | Original release date | Prod. code |
|---|---|---|---|---|---|
| 1 | "The First One" | Michael Lembeck | Story by : Brian Burns & Eric Gilliland; Teleplay by : Eric Gilliland | March 10, 1998 | 1ABK01 |
| 2 | "The Second One, Believe It or Not" | Gordon Hunt | Pat Bullard & Rich Kaplan | March 17, 1998 | 1ABK03 |
| 3 | "Actually, the Third One" | Unknown | Norma Vela & Lisa Albert | March 24, 1998 | 1ABK02 |
| 4 | "94 to Syndication" | Unknown | Janet Leahy & Lisa Albert & Pat Bullard & Rich Kaplan | March 31, 1998 | 1ABK06 |
| 5 | "The Easter Story" | Michael Lembeck | Eric Gilliland | April 7, 1998 | 1ABK04 |
| 6 | "The Sixth One to Air" | TBD | Sid Youngers & Norma Vela & Stacie Lipp & Mark McAdam | unaired | 1ABK05 |

== Reception ==
Rick Lyman of The New York Times called the series "an affable car wreck of a sitcom". Ray Richmond of Variety said that it is "an uncomfortably crude" series that "looks to be a jarringly insular, Hollywood vision of how the gentiles must live". Tom Shales of The Washington Post panned the show, describing it as a "pathetic attempt by ABC to do a blue-collar sitcom in the tradition of 'Roseanne'. . . . It's not imitated, of course, in ways that matter or in terms of quality and credibility." In response to the Easter episode, which aired on April 7, 1998, the series was denounced by the Catholic League for Religious and Civil Rights as "the most anti-Catholic television show ever".
