= Parvesh Cheena =

American actor

- Born: Parvesh Singh Cheena; Elk Grove Village, Illinois, U.S.
- Occupation: Actor
- Years active: 2002–present

Parvesh Singh Cheena is an American actor. He is best known for his roles as Gupta in the TV series Outsourced and as Sunil Odhav on Crazy Ex-Girlfriend. He also voices Bodhi in T.O.T.S. and Blades in Transformers: Rescue Bots.

== Early life ==
Cheena was born in Elk Grove Village, Illinois and is of Punjabi descent. He grew up in Naperville, Illinois, a suburb of Chicago, and went to Waubonsie Valley High School. He studied musical theatre at the Chicago College of Performing Arts.

== Career ==
Cheena's first feature film role was in Barbershop as Samir. He reprised the role in the 2004 sequel, Barbershop 2: Back in Business. His other film roles include Because I Said So (2007), The Other End of the Line and The Ode (2008), House Broken (2009), Just Before I Go (2014), Everything Before Us (2015), Time Toys (2016), Literally, Right Before Aaron (2017), Lady and the Tramp (2019), Definition Please (2020), Music (2021), The Bob's Burgers Movie (2022), and Sometimes I Think About Dying (2023).

== Personal life ==
Cheena is gay. He told Michael Jensen of AfterElton in September 2010 that he came out in college, told his family at age 21, and was in a relationship with a script coordinator at the time. In August 2021, he criticized representation of gay characters in media, telling Insider that "White people were allowed to be gay, in a sense, or be queer as an identifier. People see our color and ethnicity first before our sexuality."

He is also a member of the Democratic Socialists of America.

He currently resides in Los Angeles, California.

== Filmography ==
=== Film ===
Year	Title	Role	Notes
2002	Barbershop	Samir	
2004	Barbershop 2: Back in Business	Samir	
2007	Because I Said So	Foreign Guy	
2007	Universal Remote	Sammy, Baliff	
2008	The Other End of the Line	NY cabbie	
2008	The Ode	Salman	
2009	House Broken	Zerban	
2014	Just Before I Go	Abhay	
2015	Everything Before Us	Eric	
2016	Time Toys	Franklin	
2017	Literally, Right Before Aaron	Rohan	
2019	Lady and the Tramp	Mr. Richland	
2020	Definition Please	Jimit Uncle	
2021	Music	Electronics Store Manager	
2022	The Bob's Burgers Movie	Potential Customer	Voice
2023	Sometimes I Think About Dying	Garrett	
TBA	Astrological	Astrologer	Post-production

=== Television ===
Year	Title	Role	Notes
2004	ER	Dr. Agbo	Episode: "Twas the Night"
2006	The Suite Life of Zack & Cody	Mr. Babalabaloo	Episode: "Boston Holiday"
2006	The West Wing	Barista	Episode: "The Last Hurrah"
2006	The O.C.	Passerby	Episode: "The Avengers"
2006–2007	Help Me Help You	Parvesh	5 Episodes
2008	Brothers & Sisters	Jordan	2 Episodes
2007–2008	'Til Death	Ken, Leo	3 Episodes
2009	My Name Is Earl	Savage Indian in Jungle	Episode: "My Name is Alias"
2010	Sons of Tucson	Stewart	Episode: "Father's Day"
2010	Criminal Minds	Father	Episode: "A Rite of Passage"
2010–2011	Outsourced	Gupta	22 episodes
2011	The Fresh Beat Band	Genie	Episode: "Bollywood Beats – Jai Ho"
2011–2016	Transformers: Rescue Bots	Blades, additional voices	Voice, main role
2012	Squad 85	Alan Rickman	Episode: "It's Not the Work, It's the Stares"
2013	Arrested Development	Kabir	Episode: "Indian Takers"
2013–2014	Randy Cunningham: 9th Grade Ninja	Pradeep	Voice, 4 episodes
2013	Sean Saves the World	Jerry	7 episodes
2014	A to Z	Dinesh	13 episodes
2015–2018	The Goldbergs	Andy Cesunda	3 episodes
2016	TripTank	Sajeep	Voice, episode: "Crime Steve Investigation"
2016	Better Things	Voiceover Director	Episode: "Woman is the Something of the Something"
2016–2019	Crazy Ex-Girlfriend	Sunil Odhav	8 episodes
2017	The Odd Couple	Neil Armstrong	Episode: "Conscious Odd Coupling"
2017	Fresh Off The Boat	Mr. O'Connor	Episode: "Pie vs. Cake"
2018	The Big Bang Theory	Marcus	Episode: "The Tenant Disassociation"
2018	Alone Together	Neel	Episode: "Pootie"
2018–2022	Craig of the Creek	Raj	Voice, 10 episodes
2018	The Guest Book	Sabu	2 episodes
2019	Mr. Mom	Jerry	Episode: "Pilot"
2019	All Rise	Sai Dalal	2 episodes
2019–2022	T.O.T.S.	Bodhi	Voice, recurring role
2019–2020	The Rocketeer	Deany	Voice, recurring role
2020	Code-Switched	Parvesh	Episode: "Soft Brown Boys"
2020–2022	Mira, Royal Detective	Manish	Voice, 13 episodes
2020–2022	The Owl House	Tibbles Grimm Hammer	Voice, 3 episodes
2020	Connecting	Pradeep	8 episodes
2021	Mythic Quest	Zach	2 episodes
2021	Centaurworld	Zulius	Voice, main role
2021–2022	Central Park	Taylor	Voice, 2 episodes
2022	Raven's Home	Conductor	Episode: "A Streetcar Named Conspire"
2022–2023	Shining Vale	Laird	7 episodes
2022	The Resort	Ted	2 episodes
2022	The Rookie: Feds	Ross	Episode: "Face Off"
2022	Oddballs	Principal Loudspeaker	Voice, episode: "Breaking and Entering"
2023	The Legend of Vox Machina	Waylon Amaredda	Voice, episode: "The Trials of Vasselheim"
2023	History of the World, Part II	Publisher	Episode: "I"
2023	The Mandalorian	Nevarro Copper Droid	Voice, 3 episodes
2023	Frasier	Dev Sharma	2 episodes
2023	That Girl Lay Lay	Mr. Kimes	Episode: "How Zelda Got Her Groove Back Back"
2023–2024	Pupstruction	Rusty Whiskers	Voice, recurring role
2024	The Conners	Trivia Game Host	Episode: "When Sisters Collide and The Return of the Grifters"
2024	Ariel	Ravi	Voice, recurring role
