= Squad 85 =

- Genre: Comedy
- Created by: Gregory Bonsignore
- Theme music composer: Jeff Bowen
- Country of origin: United States
- Original language: English
- No. of seasons: 1
- No. of episodes: 6

Production
- Executive producers: Justin Lin; Gregory Bonsignore
- Producers: Andrew Beck; Reena Dutt; Parvesh Cheena
- Production locations: Hollywood, California; Sunset Gower Studios; New York City
- Camera setup: Single-camera
- Production company: YOMYOMF

Original release
- Network: YOMYOMF
- Release: November 13, 2009 – present

Squad 85 is an American comedy web series created by Gregory Bonsignore that premiered on November 13, 2012, on Justin Lin's YOMYOMF Network. The series premise establishes that, "In 1985 the Los Angeles Police Department experimented with a secret Time-Travel division, catapulting four of L.A.'s finest 25 years into the future. That future... is NOW!" Wherein four cops from 1985 time travel to present day, meeting their Chief and Bobby a new recruit to form their own police squad. The series satirizes many 1980s Cop tropes as well as other movies and shows.

Squad 85 has received acclaim from critics and has gained a cult following. They have finished photography on Series 1.

The Trailer debuted November 5, 2012.

== Cast and characters ==
The show focuses on an ensemble of police working out of an old graffiti-tatted L.A. squad house.

=== The Squad ===
- Bobby "The Rookie" (Christopher Larkin)
- Rusty "The Heartthrob" (Travis Van Winkle)
- Tori "...disguises?" (Ceci Fernandez)
- Bronx "The Muscle" (Gregory Bonsignore)
- Wheels "The Brains" (Milauna Jemai)
- The Chief "Undercover Asian Woman" (Jeff Biehl)

=== Additional cast ===
- Arch-Villain "Alan" Rickman (Parvesh Cheena)
- The Commissioner (Diedrich Bader)
- Special Needs Nathan (RJ Mitte)
- Luis (Armand Vasquez)
- The Assistant Principal (Rizwan Manji)
- Rogers (Bryan Coffee)
- Macey (Jeff Hiller)
- Rachel (Jen Winters)
- The Reporter (Sonal Shah)
- The Scientist (Danny Pudi)
- The Dancer (Ethan Zachery Scott)

== Episodes ==
- Episode 1: Out With the New:

A Police Academy grad is assigned to a top-secret Squad, and is immediately on the case of a new drug ring at Dukakis High.

- Episode 2: It's Not the Work, It's the Stares:

To see the crime scene, the Squad goes undercover, unnecessarily, as 80's-themed call girls.

- Episode 3: Special Ops:

The Squad heads back to Dukakis High to interrogate the most surprising of drug dealers (Guest star: RJ Mitte – Breaking Bad).
