= Transformers: Rescue Bots =

Children's animated television-series

- Transformers: Rescue Bots logo
- Genre: Science fiction; Adventure
- Based on: Transformers by Hasbro and Takara Tomy
- Developed by: Nicole Dubuc; Brian Hohlfeld; Jeff Kline
- Voices of: Jeff Bennett; Steve Blum; LeVar Burton; Lacey Chabert; Parvesh Cheena; D. C. Douglas; Élan Garfias; Maurice LaMarche; Jason Marsden; Shannon McKain; Diamond White; Imari Williams
- Theme music composer: Starr Parodi; Jeff Eden Fair
- Opening theme: "Transformers: Rescue Bots (Main Title)" performed by Josh Ramsay
- Composers: Starr Parodi (season 1); Jeff Eden Fair (season 1); Christopher Elves (seasons 2–4)
- Countries of origin: United States; Canada
- Original language: English
- No. of seasons: 4
- No. of episodes: 104 (list of episodes)

Production
- Executive producers: Jeff Kline (season 1); Brian Hohlfeld (seasons 2–4); Frank Molieri (seasons 2–4); Nicole Dubuc (season 4); Stephen Davis; For DHX Media: Kirsten Newlands (seasons 3–4)
- Producer: Judge Plummer (seasons 3–4)
- Running time: 22 minutes
- Production companies: Darby Pop Productions (season 1); Atomic Cartoons (season 1); Vision Animation (season 2); Moody Street Kids (season 2); DHX Media (seasons 3–4); Hasbro Studios

Original release
- Network: Hub Network (seasons 1–2); Discovery Family (seasons 3–4)
- Release: December 17, 2011 – October 22, 2016

Related
- Transformers: Rescue Bots Academy; Transformers: Prime; Transformers: Robots in Disguise

Transformers: Rescue Bots (or simply Rescue Bots) is an animated television series that aired on The Hub Network / Discovery Family and aimed at a younger generation of Transformers fans based on toy manufacturer Hasbro's Transformers franchise. Rescue Bots is the successor of Transformers: Robot Heroes and is based on the same concept as the Marvel Superhero Adventures and Star Wars Jedi Force franchises, it also has similar traits to Mattel's toyline, Rescue Heroes. Rescue Bots mainly focuses on educating children regarding hazards and safety. Relating to other Transformers series/continuities, Rescue Bots features human and Autobot allies as well as a toy line.

The original toy line and the storybook series feature the team of Chief Charlie Burns (Optimus Prime's and Hoist's partner), an adult Cody Burns (Heatwave's partner), Sawyer Storm (Blades' and Medix's partner), Walker Cleveland (Boulder's partner), Billy Blastoff and Jack "Hunter" Tracker (Chase's partners), and Axel Frazier (Bumblebee's partner); the TV series features Blades, Boulder, Chase, and Heatwave - the original group of Autobots - who are joined by Chief Charlie Burns (Chase's partner), Cody Burns as a child (Optimus Prime's and Salvage's partner), Dani Burns (Blades's partner), Kade Burns (Heatwave's partner), and Graham Burns (Boulder's partner), as well as Doc Greene and Francine Greene as supporting characters (who later in the series become temporary partners to the Autobot High Tide). Season 1 is available for streaming via Roku. Hasbro has also made seasons 1–3 available digitally on iTunes and on YouTube through a paid subscription.

The trailer for the fourth season was released on January 22, 2016 which shows an older Cody Burns and a female rescue bot named Quickshadow. Season 4 first aired on April 23, 2016 and ended on October 22, 2016, lasted for four years.

104 episodes have been produced. As of its fourth season, Rescue Bots is the longest-running Transformers series, surpassing The Transformers, which aired for 98 episodes. On June 6, 2017, it was announced that the series had ended production and would be succeeded by Transformers: Rescue Bots Academy. None of the cast members reprised their roles in the series.

== Synopsis ==
Set on the fictional island of Griffin Rock somewhere off the coast of Maine, the Rescue Bots (a group of Autobots designed for rescue missions) named Heatwave, Boulder, Blades, and Chase respond to Optimus Prime's message for any active Autobots in outer space to come to Earth. Coming out of a long stasis, the Rescue Bots learn what became of Cybertron and that they are one of the only Rescue Bot teams remaining. Deeming them too valuable for them to join the fight against the Decepticons, Optimus Prime partners them with the Burns Family composed of first response rescuers. Together, they learn teamwork and heroism alongside their human friends as they deal with various disasters while also getting themselves familiar with Earth's cultures. Rescue Bots is set in the franchise's Aligned continuity, which features contemporary fiction such as the concurrently-running Transformers: Prime and Transformers: Robots in Disguise series, alongside other media such as Transformers: Exodus, Transformers: War for Cybertron, Transformers: Rise of the Dark Spark, Transformers: Fall of Cybertron, Transformers: Exiles, and Transformers: Retribution.

== Characters ==
=== Rescue Bots ===
The Rescue Bots are a group of Cybertronians that are used for Rescue Missions.

==== Rescue Force Sigma-17 ====
Rescue Force Sigma-17 is the main Rescue Bot team in the series. Among its members are:

- Heatwave (voiced by Steve Blum) is a Rescue Bot who transforms into a fire engine and is partnered with Kade Burns. He is second in command after Optimus Prime and is equal rank with High Tide. Heatwave dislikes the fact the Rescue Bots have to pretend they are mindless robots whenever they are around Griffin Rock's citizens. In "Changes", Heatwave scans a sunken fireboat, giving him the ability to transform into a fireboat. In "Quarry vs. Quarry", Heatwave gains an Apatosaurus form upon scanning an Apatosaurus model.
- Chase (voiced by D.C. Douglas) is a Rescue Bot that transforms into a police car and is partnered with Chief Charlie Burns the leader. Chase has a "by-the-book" personality and tends to fuss over any new concept that violates any law he is familiar with, though at times his dry sense of humor and understanding emerges. He gets along well with Charlie Burns, though the two occasionally disagree due to the Chief's compassion-based response to police work and Chase's letter-of-the-law personality. In "Quarry vs. Quarry", Chase gains a Stegosaurus form upon scanning a Stegosaurus model with electricity powers in the tail .
- Blades (voiced by Parvesh Cheena) is a Rescue Bot who transforms into a rescue helicopter and is partnered with Dani Burns. Back on Cybertron, Blades had a land-based vehicle mode and is not used to flying, thus culminating in a slight fear of heights. Out of the Rescue Bots, he is the most expressive emotionally, and develops a love of human television and film. In "Quarry vs. Quarry", Blades gains a Pteranodon form upon scanning a Pteranodon model.
- Boulder (voiced by Imari Williams) is a Rescue Bot who transforms into a bulldozer and is partnered with Graham Burns. Boulder is fascinated with Earth culture and is always eager to learn more from books and other sources. He has a very kind and friendly demeanor, and enjoys gardening, interacting with animals, and painting. In "Big Game", Boulder works on an Energon Patch to use on Optimus Prime's Primal Form and tests it by scanning a Triceratops model to assume this Primal Form, thus making him the second Rescue Bot to be a Triple Changer.

==== New Recruits ====
- Blurr (voiced by Max Mittelman) is a Rescue Bot who transforms into a race car. He and Salvage crash-landed on Earth during a meteor shower over 10,000 years ago in their cargo ship. Blurr was the pilot of the ship. He loves being fast and takes pride in his speed, but he is also extremely reckless and impatient.
- Salvage (voiced by Jason Marsden) is a Rescue Bot who transforms into a garbage truck. He and Blurr crash-landed on Earth during a meteor shower over 10,000 years ago in their cargo ship. Unlike Blurr, Salvage quickly began to enjoy living on Earth and gained the respect of the other Rescue Bots, after successfully taking charge during his first rescue.
- Quickshadow (voiced by Alex Kingston) is a female Rescue Bot who transforms into a car. Kade refers to it as an "Austly Benton" and it first appears in season 4. She was first seen in the desert of North Africa when Heatwave and Chase had a problem with the Groundbridge in "Bridge Building" (which was caused by her) and introduces herself in "Arrivals". In "Plus One", it is revealed that she has many other names used to cover her identity, with the name "Quickshadow" being one of them. It is unknown what her real name is.

=== Autobots ===
==== Bee Team ====
- Bumblebee (vocal effects provided by Nicole Dubuc, voiced by Will Friedle in "Uninvited Guest") is the legendary Autobot Scout, war hero, and a member of Optimus Prime's team of Autobots. As seen in Transformers: Prime, Bumblebee lost his voice box while being tortured by Megatron and possesses a unique form of speech. In "Bumblebee to the Rescue", he pays a visit to Griffin Rock while tracking a meteor that landed on a nearby uninhabited island and meets the Rescue Bots and the Burns family (who were also investigating the meteor). He is later briefly assigned by Optimus Prime to observe the Rescue Bots and Burns family working together. Later on, he teams up with Blades and the Burns family to destroy the meteor after the other Rescue Bots are infected by a mysterious substance contained within the fallen meteor.
- Sideswipe (voiced by Darren Criss) is a member of Bumblebee's bee team. After intercepting Bounce on the mainland, the Mini-Con escaped through the team's GroundBridge and teleported to the island of Griffin Rock, forcing Sideswipe to pursue him. While chasing him down, he encountered Blurr, and immediately believed that he was a Decepticon. The misunderstanding was instantly cleared up after the other Rescue Bots arrived. Heatwave filled him in on their mission on Earth. Blurr was impressed by Sideswipe and asked him for some rescue tips - but Sideswipe wasn't particularly interested in helping humans. However, he promised Blurr that he would recommend him to Bumblebee once he returned to the mainland, and offered him the opportunity to join the Bee Team.

==== Other Autobots ====
- Optimus Prime (voiced by Peter Cullen) is the leader of the Autobots who transforms into a semi-trailer truck. He gave the Rescue Bots their mission and mainly appears via view-screen. In "Land Before Prime", Optimus Prime arrives on Wayward Island to help the Rescue Bots. He scans Trex as a secondary form where gains a Tyrannosaurus form (with this form being referred to in the toyline as Optimus Primal).
- High Tide (voiced by Michael Bell) is an Autobot veteran and master seaman who is Optimus Prime's old acquaintance. He transforms into a submarine and can combine with his rescue rig to form a larger robot.
  - Servo is a dog-like Autobot Helper-Bot who is kept in High Tide's chest compartment. He can transform himself depending on what task he is needed to carry out and even transform his limbs independently for minor tasks.

=== Burns Family ===
- Charlie Burns (voiced by Maurice LaMarche) is Griffin Rock's chief of police and the leader of its Rescue Team. Charlie Burns is the father of Cody, Kade, Dani, and Graham and the older brother of Woodrow Burns.
- Cody Burns (voiced by Elan Garfias as a child, Oliver Vaquer as an adult in "One for the Ages") is the youngest member of the Burns family and one of the main characters in the show. Despite his age (9 years in season 1-3, 12-13 in season 4), Cody acts as the team's communications officer. He also acts to help the bots become accustomed to life on Earth and guide them. He acts as a mediator between them and his older siblings.
- Kade Burns (voiced by Jason Marsden) is Cody's oldest brother who works as a firefighter. Kade is somewhat of a glory-hog and isn't too keen on working with Heatwave at first; they eventually come to respect each other.
- Dani Burns (voiced by Lacey Chabert) is Cody's older sister who works as a rescue helicopter pilot. Unlike her partner Blades, Dani loves flying and has trouble getting along with Blades due to his fear of heights, but eventually learns how to work with him.
- Dr. Graham Burns (voiced by Shannon McKain) is Cody's older brother who works as a construction engineer. At first, Graham has trouble working with Boulder due in part to his own misconceptions. Though Graham is fascinated by Boulder and wishes to learn about Cybertron, he mistakenly believes that because Boulder is from an advanced alien civilization, there is little he (someone from a more primitive civilization like Earth's) could possibly teach him.
- Woodrow "Woody" Burns (voiced by Mark Hamill) is the free-spirited younger brother of Charlie Burns and the uncle of Cody, Kade, Dani, and Graham. Both an inventor and an adventurer, Woodrow has a keen interest in the mysterious and paranormal, spending his time hunting for evidence of aliens and other creatures.

=== Greene Family ===
- Dr. Ezra "Doc" Greene (voiced by LeVar Burton) is Griffin Rock's top inventor, scientist, and the father of Francine Greene. Though many of his inventions he creates are meant to be helpful or with good intention, they have a tendency to go haywire or cause trouble.
- Francine "Frankie" Elma Greene (voiced by Diamond White) is Ezra Greene's daughter and Cody's best friend. She is somewhat suspicious of the Rescue Bots. Near the end of season 1, Frankie learns the truth about the Rescue Bots after she was saved by Heatwave. She subsequently becomes a frequent companion of the Rescue Bots on their adventures.
- Professor Anna Baranova (voiced by Kath Soucie) is a scientist who lives on Griffin Rock and is a colleague of Ezra Greene. She had resided in the underwater laboratory called Midgard which had since been trapped near an ocean trench following a methane explosion. Although Anna was reluctant to leave Midgard, Cody convinced her to leave Midgard as she blows it up. Afterwards, Anna moves back to Griffin Rock, taking up residence in a replica of Midgard.
- CeCe Greene (voiced by Kath Soucie) is Doc Greene and Professor Baranova's daughter and Frankie Greene's baby half-sister. She was born during the three-year gap between seasons 3 and 4.
- Dither (voiced by LeVar Burton) is Doc Greene's robot assistant, who seems obsessed with offering people toast – most likely because Doc is a big fan of the food. While a helpful assistant, Dither is also an occasional source of trouble.
- Aristotle and Edison are Ezra Greene's pet Doberman Pinschers. They are named after the philosopher Aristotle and the inventor Thomas Edison.
- Trex (voiced by LeVar Burton) is a robotic Tyrannosaurus who was damaged by a fire at the Griffin Rock Natural History Museum. It was reactivated and went on a rampage until it was subdued by the Rescue Bots and returned to the museum. After some break-ins at the lab, Ezra Greene took the Tyrannosaurus robot and reprogrammed it into "Trex" to guard the lab.

=== Antagonists ===
- Dr. Thaddeus Morocco (voiced by Tim Curry in 2012, Greg Ellis in 2014-2016) is a mad scientist who plotted revenge against Chief Charlie Burns, Mayor Luskey, and Ezra Greene for making him an outcast by sabotaging a road roller, starting a fire, and using more nanites to control a toy rocket and Doc Greene's solar car and sending his MorBot to save the day. This allowed him to take over the Rescue Team's job but they eventually discover his true natures. Even though the Rescue Bots managed to thwart him, Dr. Morocco managed to get away on Mayor Luskey's schooner. In "The Last of Morocco", it is revealed that Morocco had known Jules Verne, the two of them having met in the past. It was from Verne that Morocco obtained the Verne device, the machine that serves to power his chamber of youth; Verne invented it and gave Morocco one of the two prototypes. Morocco soon set out on his path of self-service and villainy, while Verne set out to explore time and space.
  - The MorBots (voiced by Maurice LaMarche) are a group of robots that were created by Dr. Morocco. They are Morocco's version of the Rescue Bots, and capable of transforming between vehicle and robot modes and flight and fire fighting .
  - The Morocco Virus (voiced by Greg Ellis) is a sentient computer virus that manifests in the form of Dr. Morocco and was hidden in an Expansion pack of the in-series video game Griffin Rock: Element Quest, which went undiscovered until some years after Morocco took up residence in the future.
- Madeline Pynch (voiced by Stacy Darrow) is a rich woman who is the mother of Priscilla Pynch, works at an as-yet-unnamed company, and is good friends with Mayor Luskey. In "Double Villainy", Pynch works with Dr. Morocco to capture the Autobots one-by-one to make their slaves and replace them with robotic copies of the Rescue Bots as part of a plot to get the gold that is underneath Griffin Rock. Pynch appears throughout the series as an ally of Morocco.
- Evan & Myles (both voiced by Robbie Daymond) are two local troublemakers who reside in Griffin Rock and engage in criminal activity. Evan does most of the talking while Myles makes sounds.
- Vigil (voiced by Bill Mumy) is a vigilant-model computer programmed to protect humans. It can invade and control technology, track people by accessing their mobile phones, and even listen in on conversations. However, Vigil obtains sentience, becomes too overprotective and is dedicated to the point of obsession, enforcing heavy restrictions and even acting to prevent the Rescue Bots from performing their duties since it is incapable of taking control of them.
- The Energon Eaters are eel-like aliens that feed on Energon, the primary power source used by Transformers. They hunt largely by scent, being able to smell flowing Energon and can also channel Energon through their tails.
- Colonel Quint Quarry (voiced by Jim Cummings) is a big-game hunter who holds illegal safaris for hunting wildlife. Colonel Quarry has a wide array of gadgetry and vehicles at his command including the Heli-Jet (a helicopter with jet engines), a jeep equipped with net-launchers and camouflage features, and Q-Drones.
  - The Q-Drones (voiced by Jim Cummings) are tiki-like drones who work for Colonel Quint Quarry and Thurston Chumley.
    - Amber Drone is a flying robot that works for Colonel Quint Quarry and is larger than the Q-Drones.
- The Velgroxs (voiced by Jeff Bennett) are an alien race that has been known enemies of the Cybertronians and are known for eating sentient organisms. In "New Normal", a ship of Velgrox intercepts a transmission from Cody Burns and Frankie Greene, alerting them to the presence of food on Earth. The Velgrox land in Griffin Rock and set about capturing as many humans as possible. The Velgrox abduct a good deal of the island's population until the Rescue Bots intervened. Believing that Earth is controlled by Cybertronians, the Velgrox surrender.
- Lord Thurston Chumley (voiced by Jim Cummings) is Colonel Quint Quarry's brother and also a big-game hunter. Unlike his family, he has taken great pride in having built up a huge menagerie of trophy animals where they are all kept in stasis and maintains a vicious rivalry with his brother.
- Chickadee (voiced by Kristen Schaal) is the "head honcho and bear wrestler" of Camp Itsa Craftsee who had been searching for the emeralds hidden within a nearby cave. When Graham, Cody, and a disguised Blades visit her camp for the elevation ceremony, they discover her true motives and she forces them to find the emeralds by trapping them in the cave. When the Rescue Team arrive, Chickadee attempts to flee in a dune buggy, only to be startled by Blades and crash into a tree. She is arrested by Chief Burns after this.
- Bounce (voiced by Steve Blum) is a rogue Cyclone Mini-Con who focuses on destruction but isn't very intelligent. His spherical alternate mode is fast enough to make a speedy getaway whenever in pursuit.
- Skip Scobble (voiced by Eric Bauza) is Maven Danger's agent.

=== Griffin Rock townspeople ===
- Mayor H.B. Luskey (voiced by Jeff Bennett) – The mayor of Griffin Rock. Luskey is particularly obsessed with drawing tourists to Griffin Rock and employing unwise or unsafe methods of doing so which causes the Burns family to work in saving everyone.
- Mrs. Luskey (voiced by Nicole Sullivan) – The wife of Mayor Luskey.
  - Poopsie (vocal effects provided by Dee Bradley Baker) – The pet poodle of Mrs. Luskey.
- Huxley Prescott (voiced by Jeff Bennett) – A TV reporter. Prescott believes that the Rescue Bots are spies who were sent to Griffin Rock as part of a mission to take over Earth.
- Mr. Harrison (voiced by D.C. Douglas) – Mr. Harrison is a resident of Griffin Rock. He owns a heli-pack that has a few technical issues and is a recurring beneficiary of the team's efforts.
- Mr. Rubio (voiced by Jeff Bennett) – Mr. Rubio is a resident of Griffin Rock and the husband of Mrs. Rubio. He is known to be a slow driver.
- Mrs. Rubio (voiced by Lacey Chabert) – Mrs. Rubio is a resident of Griffin Rock and the wife of Mr. Rubio.
- Mrs. Neederlander (voiced by Billie Hayes) – An elderly resident of Griffin Rock who runs a bed and breakfast and also is the rider of mid winter.
  - Mister Pettypaws – Mrs. Neederlander's pet cat.
- Mr. Alper (voiced by Steve Blum) – Mr. Alper is a resident of Griffin Rock who is a member of its city council.
- Mr. Levy (voiced by Jason Marsden) – Mr. Levy is a fisherman at Griffin Rock.
- Edgar Prewett (voiced by Maurice LaMarche) – Edgar Prewett is a truck driver in Griffin Rock who has an imaginary wife.
- Mr. Bufkin – Mr. Bufkin is a Griffin Rock cow farmer farmer who owns many cows.
- Mr. Hunter (voiced by Maurice LaMarche) – Mr. Hunter is a Griffin Rock newsdealer and vendor.
- Mr. Bunty (voiced by Steve Blum) – Mr. Bunty is a resident of Griffin Rock. He works at the Griffin Rock Drive-In as revealed in "The Attack of Humungado."
- Don (voiced by Robbie Daymond) – Don is a resident of Griffin Rock who has a need for speed which often gets him in trouble with Chief Burns and Chase.
- Mr. Perkins (voiced by Steve Blum) – Mr. Perkins is a Griffin Rock farmer who grows corn.
- Milo (voiced by Jason Marsden) – Milo is an excitable resident of Griffin Rock. He has a tendency to break out the helium balloons and pitchforks
- Captain Arthur Shaw (voiced by Maurice LaMarche) – Captain Arthur Shaw is a sea captain who runs the Griffin Rock ferry. He has a tendency to want to go down with his ship but has also shown be very capable under pressure.
- Hayley (voiced by Lacy Chabert in "Under Pressure", Danica McKellar in later episodes) – Hayley is a Griffin Rock resident who works as a pre-school teacher. She has often gone out with Kade on different occasions, though initially she was put off by his attitude. In "Buddy System," it is revealed that Hayley has studied botany.
- Nancy Morrison – Nancy Morrison is a resident of Griffin Rock.
- Pfeiffer – Mr. Pfeiffer is a baker who runs a bakery in Griffin Rock.
- Captain Wild (voiced by Steve Blum) – Captain Wild is a resident of Griffin Rock who is a keen fisherman. He is frequently seen with Captain Shaw.
- Mr. Sharma (voiced by Parvesh Cheena) – Mr. Sharma is a Griffin Rock resident.
- Taylor (voiced by Roger Craig Smith) – Taylor is a young pilot in Griffin Rock who is a love interest for Dani. He first appears-unnamed-in "The Lost Bell," where Dani and Blades save him from his own plane as it is being blown about by an intense storm, and he displays almost immediate interest in Dani which she reciprocates. In "Vanishing Returns" it is indicated that he and Dani are friends or possibly dating as a result of the three-year interval between seasons.
- Deputy Barney (voiced by Jeff Bennett) – A deputy who works in the Griffin Rock Police Department. He means well but is often outwitted by the highly intelligent criminals Griffin Rock's police department works against.
- Jerry (voiced by Shannon McKain) – A resident of Griffin Rock who works as a bus driver and a truck driver. He is one of several citizens who are rescued by the team on a regular basis.
- Priscilla Pinch (voiced by Katherine McNamara) – Priscilla Pinch is the spoiled daughter of Madeline Pinch, but is apparently unaware of her mother's illegal activities. She takes part in various contests aimed at Griffin Rock youth and becomes irritated when she fails to secure first prize.
- Amy (voiced by Hynden Walch) – An engineering student who moves to Griffin Rock with her pet monkey. Graham quickly becomes interested in her, but has difficulty overcoming his shyness to approach her until he takes a leadership role during a rescue mission.
  - Tesla – Tesla is Amy's pet monkey who has a tendency to get loose. He is named after Nikola Tesla.
- Carin (voiced by Nancy Linari) – Carin is a woman who formerly worked as a police dispatcher on the mainland. She is the sister of Jerry and the aunt of Timmy.
- Virginia (voiced by Billie Hayes) – A woman who works as a zookeeper at the Griffin Rock Zoo.
- Lad Pioneers – The Lad Pioneers is a boy scout organization for young lads to teach them the finer points of camping and knot tying. Cody Burns is a member of the Griffin Rock Lad Pioneer troop and owns a copy of the Lad Pioneers Handbook. Given the book is the 1959 edition, it is likely other members of his family were Lad Pioneers as well.
  - Billy (voiced by Jason Marsden) – A member of the Lad Pioneers.
  - Corey – A member of the Lad Pioneers.
  - George (voiced by Shannon McKain – A member of the Lad Pioneers.
  - Jimmy (voiced by Jason Marsden) – A member of the Lad Pioneers.
  - Kyle (voiced by Jay Mohr) – A member of the Lad Pioneers.
  - Timmy (voiced by Jason Marsden) – The son of Jerry who is a member of the Lad Pioneers and nephew of Carin.
- Mrs. Lima (voiced by Kath Soucie) – The strict librarian at the Mayor Luskey Library.
- Foster (voiced by Greg Ellis) – A balloon vendor that lives in Griffin Rock.
- Miss Frederick (voiced by Lacey Chabert) – The owner of a florist shop in Griffin Rock.
- Dr. McSwain (voiced by Ginny McSwain) – A doctor who works in Griffin Rock. She is named after her voice actor.

=== Historical figures ===
- Chester A. Arthur (voiced by Jeff Bennett) – The 21st President of the United States. A hologram of him is displayed in Griffin Rock's Hall of Inspiration museum.
- Elma Hendrickson (voiced by Kath Soucie) – Griffin Rock's first female scientist who lived in Griffin Rock around the same time that Dr. Morocco first took up resident on the island.
- Charlotte Wayne (voiced by Kath Soucie) – A resident of Griffin Rock two hundred years ago, but now she is known as the Lady of Griffin Rock. Some two hundred years ago, Wayne's husband and sons left for the mainland during a storm. Their boat went missing, and thereafter Charlotte Wayne was said to haunt the island in search of her family.
- Horace Burns – Horace Burns is the founder of Griffin Rock.
- Bertha Burns – Bertha Burns is an ex-pirate to whom Dani bears more than a passing resemblance. Bertha stole from the townspeople of Griffin Rock, but left her pirate past behind where she hid her true identity for fear of bringing shame to the family of the man she loved. However, she left clues for her descendants to find her ship and stolen loot in the hope that they would do the right thing with it. Bertha's past was later discovered by Woodrow Burns and Dani led her family in the search. Once Bertha's ship was found in the ground, the Burns family turned Bertha's stolen fortune over to charity.
- Jules Verne (voiced by Diedrich Bader) – An 18th century author and time traveler who long ago befriended Dr. Morocco, and provided him with one of the prototypes of his Verne device. While Morocco employed his to keep himself young up until the present day, Verne was able to use Energon to power his as part of a time machine, which he has used to explore the past and future. At some point prior to returning to his own time and before writing 20,000 Leagues Under the Sea, Verne was contacted by Morocco and traveled to the present, where he met the Rescue Bots. Together, they located Morocco's submarine, the search for which inspired him to write his famous work upon returning to his own time. After Morocco was captured and restored to his youthful state, Verne and the Burnses came up with a plan to erase Morocco's memories of being a villain and transport him to the future so that he could have a fresh start. Morocco escaped and nearly succeeded in stealing Verne's time machine, but the Rescue Bots managed to thwart him, allowing Verne to escape to the future with Morocco. They are last seen exploring the future, with Morocco's memories apparently erased.

== Episodes ==
Season	Episodes	Originally released		
Season	Episodes	First released	Last released	Network
1	26	December 17, 2011	August 18, 2012	The Hub/Hub Network
2	24	March 1, 2014	August 2, 2014	The Hub/Hub Network
3	28	November 1, 2014	June 13, 2015	Discovery Family
4	26	April 23, 2016	October 22, 2016	Discovery Family

== Broadcast and release ==
A television series was produced independently from the earlier released storybooks, set in the same story continuity as Transformers: Prime and Transformers Robots in Disguise with occasional crossovers. The show aired on Hasbro's and Discovery's television network, Discovery Family. Rescue Bots is developed for television by Nicole Dubuc, Brian Hohlfeld, and Jeff Kline. The series had a sneak peek on December 17, 2011, and officially premiered on February 18, 2012. It premiered on Discovery Kids in India.

== Home video release ==
Shout! Factory have released several DVDs in the US, featuring random episodes:

Title	Release Date	Episodes
Roll To The Rescue	October 2, 2012	"Family of Heroes" (season 1, episode 1); "Under Pressure" (season 1, episode 2); "Hotshots" (season 1, episode 3); "Flobsters on Parade" (season 1, episodes 4); "The Alien Invasion of Griffin Rock" (season 1, episode 5); "Four Bots and a Baby" (season 1, episode 7)
Energize	June 11, 2013	"Cody on Patrol" (season 1, episode 6); "Walk on the Wild Side" (season 1, episode 8); "Christmas in July"(season 1, episode 9); "Deep Trouble" (season 1, episode 10); "Return of the Dinobot" (season 1, episode 11)
Griffin Rock Rescue	October 22, 2013	"The Other Doctor" (season 1, episode 12); "The Reign of Morocco" (season 1, episode 13); "Small Blessings" (season 1, episode 14); "The Griffin Rock Triangle" (season 1, episode 15); "Rules and Regulations" (season 1, episode 16)
Heroes on the Scene	March 18, 2014	"The Lost Bell" (season 1, episode 17); "You've Been Squilshed" (season 1, episode 19); "Little White Lies" (season 1, episode 22); "Shake Up" (season 1, episode 23); "Rescue Boy" (season 1, episode 24)
Mystery Rescue	September 2, 2014	"Countdown" (season 1, episode 20); "The Haunting of Griffin Rock" (season 1, episode 21); "Spellbound" (season 2, episode 5); "Blame the Gremlins" (season 2, episode 8); "Feed the Beast" (season 2, episode 9)
Jurassic Adventure	February 10, 2015	"Family of Heroes" (season 1, episode 1); "Return of the Dinobot" (season 1, episode 11); "What Lies Below" (season 2, episode 10); "What Rises Above" (season 2, episode 11); "In Search of the Griffin's Nest" (season 2, episode 16); "Movers and Shakers" (season 2, episode 20)
Return of the Heroes	May 12, 2015	"Bumblebee to the Rescue" (season 1, episode 18); "Bot to the Future" (season 1, episode 26); "A Virtual Disaster" (season 2, episode 6); "Changes" (season 2, episode 19); "Rise of the Heroes" (season 2, episode 24)
Dinobots	August 25, 2015	"Land Before Prime" (season 3, episode 1); "Big Game" (season 3, episode 2); "Quarry vs. Quarry" (season 3, episode 11); "Did You See What I Thaw?" (season 3, episode 13); "The Attack of Humungado" (season 3, episode 14)
Adventures in Time and Space	February 23, 2016	"It's a Bot Time" (season 1, episode 25); "Unfinished Business" (season 3, episode 5); "Switcheroo" (season 3, episode 8); "Time After Time" (season 3, episode 16); "The Last of Morocco" (season 3, episode 19)
Heroes of Tech	June 21, 2016	"One For The Ages" (season 2, episode 3); "Space Bots" (season 2, episode 12); "The Island Of Misfit Tech" (season 2, episode 13); "Too Many Kades" (season 3, episode 3); "I Have Heard The Robots Singing" (season 3, episode 26)
Battle for Justice	October 25, 2016	"Rescue Dog" (season 2, episode 18); "The Griffin Rock Express" (season 2, episode 22); "Double Villainy" (season 2, episode 23); "Bugs In The System" (season 3, episode 7); "Pirates Ahoy" (season 3, episode 17)
Protect and Explore	February 21, 2017	"Tip Of The Iceberg" (season 2, episode 4); "Buddy System" (season 2, episode 15); "No Place Like Dome" (season 3, episode 6); "Thieves Like Us" (season 3, episode 15); "The New Recruits" (season 3, episode 20)
Rescue Family	June 20, 2017	"Road Trip" (season 2, episode 1); "Odd Bot Out" (season 2, episode 21); "Chief Woodrow" (season 3, episode 12); "More Than Meets the Eye" (season 3, episode 25); "Prescott's Bots" (season 2, episode 7)
Outdoor Adventures	January 30, 2018	"The Riders Of Midwinter" (season 3, episode 9); "Phantom Of The Sea" (season 3, episode 4); "Turning The Tide" (season 3, episode 18); "A New Hero" (season 3, episode 22); "Endangered Species" (season 3, episode 24)
Team Rescue Bots!	May 22, 2018	"Sky Forest" (season 2, episode 2); "The Vigilant Town" (season 2, episode 14); "Bots and Robbers" (season 2, episode 17); "Rescue Bots Academy" (season 3, episode 21); "A New Hero" (season 3, episode 22); "Four-Legged Hero" (season 3, episode 23); "Bot-Tastic Voyage" (season 3, episode 10)

Beyond Home Entertainment have released the first two seasons on DVD in Australia:

Title	Release Date	Episodes
V1: Hot Shots	November 6, 2013	"Family of Heroes" (season 1, episode 1); "Under Pressure" (season 1, episode 2); "Hotshots" (season 1, episode 3); "Flobsters on Parade" (season 1, episode 4); "The Alien Invasion of Griffin Rock" (season 1, episode 5)
V2: Cody on Patrol	November 6, 2013	"Cody on Patrol" (season 1, episode 6); "Walk on the Wild Side" (season 1, episode 8); "Four Bots and a Baby" (season 1, episode 7); "Christmas in July" (season 1, episode 9); "Deep Trouble" (season 1, episode 10)
V3: Return of the Dino Bot	February 5, 2014	"Return of the Dino Bot" (season 1, episode 11); "The Other Doctor" (season 1, episode 12); "The Reign of Morocco" (season 1, episode 13); "Small Blessings" (season 1, episode 14); "The Griffin Rock Triangle" (season 1, episode 15)
V4: Bumblebee to the Rescue	June 4, 2014	"Rules and Regulations" (season 1, episode 16); "The Lost Bell" (season 1, episode 17); "Bumblebee to the Rescue" (season 1, episode 18); "You've Been Squilshed" (season 1, episode 19); "Countdown" (season 1, episode 20)
V5: Bot to the Future	January 2, 2015	"The Haunting of Griffin Rock" (season 1, episode 21); "Little White Lies" (season 1, episode 22); "Shake Up" (season 1, episode 23); "Rescue Boy" (season 1, episode 24); "It's a Bot Time" (season 1, episode 25); "Bot to the Future" (season 1, episode 26)
Season 2 V1: Serve and Protect	March 2, 2015	"Road Trip" (season 2, episode 1); "Sky Forest" (season 2, episode 2); "One for the Ages" (season 2, episode 3); "Tip of the Iceberg" (season 2, episode 4); "Spellbound" (season 2, episode 6); "A Virtual Disaster" (season 2, episode 5); "Prescott's Bots" (season 2, episode 7)
Season 2 V2: Space Bots	June 3, 2015	"Blame the Gremlins" (season 2, episode 8); "Feed the Beast" (season 2, episode 9); "What Lies Below" (season 2, episode 10); "What Rises Above" (season 2, episode 11); "Space Bots" (season 2, episode 12); "The Island of Misfit Tech" (season 2, episode 13)
Season 2 V3: Bots and Robbers	August 5, 2015	"The Vigilant Town" (season 2, episode 14); "Buddy System" (season 2, episode 15); "In Search of the Griffin's Nest" (season 2, episode 16); "Bots and Robbers" (season 2, episode 17); "Rescue Dog" (season 2, episode 18); "Changes" (season 2, episode 19)
Season 2 V4: Rise of the Heroes	December 2, 2015	"The Riders of Midwinter" (season 2, episode 20); "Movers and Shakers" (season 2, episode 21); "Chief Woodrow" (season 2, episode 22); "Odd Bot Out" (season 2, episode 23); "The Griffin Rock Express" (season 2, episode 24); "Double Villainy" (season 2, episode 25); "Rise of the Heroes" (season 2, episode 26)
Season 3 V1: Land Before Prime	April 1, 2016	"Land Before Prime" (season 3, episode 1); "Big Game" (season 3, episode 2); "Too Many Kades" (season 3, episode 3); "Phantom of the Sea" (season 3, episode 4); "Unfinished Business" (season 3, episode 5); "No Place Like Dome" (season 3, episode 6)
Season 3 V2: Bot-Tastic Voyage	July 1, 2016	"Bugs in the System" (season 3, episode 7); "Switcheroo" (season 3, episode 8); "Bot-Tastic Voyage" (season 3, episode 9); "Quarry vs. Quarry" (season 3, episode 10); "Did You See What I Thaw?" (season 3, episode 11); "The Attack of Humungado" (season 3, episode 12)

Miracle Media in the United Kingdom have rights for the first two seasons through Region 2, including most of Western Europe and the Middle East.
