= Bentonville Film Festival =

Film festival

- Opening film: East of Wall by Kate Beecroft
- Closing film: Karate Kid: Legends by Jonathan Entwhistle
- Location: Bentonville, Arkansas, US
- Founded: 2015
- Most recent: 2025
- Hosted by: BFFoundation
- Festival date: Opening: 16 June 2025; Closing: 22 June 2025
- Website: bentonvillefilmfestival.com

The Bentonville Film Festival (BFF) is an American film festival held annually in Bentonville, Arkansas, that focuses on diversity.

== Foundation ==
The Bentonville Film Festival was founded by actress Geena Davis and ARC Entertainment executive Trevor Drinkwater. Bentonville was chosen as the location after Walmart, the founding sponsor, suggested it. After Drinkwater learned Walmart was interested in supporting diversity initiatives, he brought in Davis, whom he knew would be interested because of her work with the Geena Davis Institute on Gender in Media.

The BFF is the only film festival in the world to offer guaranteed multi-platform distribution to its winners. Films that win the Audience, Jury, and Best Family Film awards receive theatrical distribution from AMC Theatres, are shown on Lifetime television, and get a DVD or video-on-demand release from Walmart and Vudu. In 2015, 87% of the films shown were distributed in some way.

The festival is notable in that until 2018, there was no functioning movie theater in Bentonville. This has led to the practice of turning any gathering area in the city into a potential screening location, including the use of "Cinetransformer" mobile theaters throughout the city.

The festival has experienced attendance growth each year, welcoming 85,000 attendees and showing over 90 feature films, 33 short films and 13 episodes in 2018.

== See also ==
- Athena Film Festival
