= List of Transformers audio releases =

This is a list of audio releases in the Transformers media franchise.

== The Transformers: The Movie music ==
=== Til All Are One ===
Til All Are One

Soundtrack album by Stan Bush and Vince DiCola
- Released: 1997
- Genre: Soundtrack
- Length: Disc 1 36:04; Disc 2 70:13
- Label: 3H Enterprises

Til All Are One is a soundtrack that contains musical compositions from The Transformers: The Movie. The release is a 2-CD set, the first contains tracks from Stan Bush's album Call to Action. The second CD contains the whole music score of The Transformers: The Movie (minus the three score pieces featured in the Motion Picture soundtrack release). It was released by 3H Enterprises as a BotCon '97 exclusive but after the album sold out in a short few months the album was reissued for BotCon '98. The song "Ground Zero" was rewritten and re-recorded by Bush as "Till All Are One" for his 2007 album In This Life. This newer version was used as the ending theme of the 2010 video game Transformers: War for Cybertron.

Disc One (Stan Bush: Call to Action):

1. The Touch (1997 Remix)
2. Never Surrender [1997 Remix]
3. Hold Your Head Up High
4. Straight to the Top
5. Dare (1997 Remix)
6. Critical Mass [featuring Vince DiCola]
7. Ground Zero (BotCon Theme)
8. Capture the Dream
9. Total Surrender
10. Highest Calling

Disc Two (Vince DiCola: The Transformers: The Movie musical score):

1. Unicron's Theme
2. Transformers: The Movie Main Title (Alternate)
3. 2005
4. More Luck Than You Imagine
5. Attack on the Shuttle
6. Gone Fishin'
7. City Under Siege
8. Showdown
9. Witness to a Funeral
10. Contest for Leadership
11. Transformation
12. Coronation
13. Destruction of the Outer Moon
14. Pursuit
15. Arrival on Junk
16. Unwelcome Visitors
17. The Matrix Survives
18. An Unexpected Friend
19. Destruction of the Inner Moon (Part I)
20. Destruction of the Inner Moon (Part II)
21. Ambush
22. Another Leader Dies
23. Rescue
24. All Hope is Lost
25. Unusual Allies
26. The Enemy Revealed
27. Seizure
28. United Against the Enemy
29. In the Belly of the Monster
30. Their Darkest Hour
31. Legacy

=== Lighting Their Darkest Hour ===
Lighting Their Darkest Hour

Soundtrack album by Vince DiCola
- Released: 2001
- Genre: Soundtrack
- Length: 75:57
- Label: 3H Enterprises

Lighting Their Darkest Hour is a soundtrack album from the film The Transformers: The Movie. It was released as an exclusive at the 2001 BotCon convention. It features the complete score from the film by the film's composer Vince DiCola. This album is considered a complete soundtrack score as it includes all the compositions heard in the final film. Tracks 7, 10, and 18 were first released on The Transformers: The Movie (Original Motion Picture Soundtrack) in 1986 and the rest were released on the BotCon'97 exclusive two-disc album Til All Are One.

Track listing:

1. Unicron's Theme
2. TF:TM Main title (Alternate) featuring Stan Bush [track written for but not used in the final cut of the movie]
3. 2005
4. More Luck Than You Imagine
5. Attack on the Shuttle [track written for but not used in the final cut of the movie]
6. Gone Fishin'
7. Autobot/Decepticon Battle
8. City Under Siege
9. Showdown
10. Death of Optimus Prime
11. Witness to a Funeral
12. Contest for Leadership
13. Transformation
14. Coronation
15. Destruction of Moon Base One
16. Destruction of Moon Base Two (I)
17. Destruction of Moon Base Two (II)
18. Escape
19. Pursuit
20. Arrival on Junk
21. Unwelcome Visitors
22. An Unexpected Friend
23. The Matrix Survives
24. Ambush
25. Another Leader Dies
26. Judgement/Rescue
27. All Hope is Lost
28. Unusual Allies
29. The Enemy Revealed
30. Confrontation
31. United Against the Enemy
32. In the Belly of the Monster
33. Their Darkest Hour

=== The Protoform Sessions ===
The Protoform Sessions

Soundtrack album by Vince DiCola
- Released: 2001
- Length: 57:10
- Label: 3H Enterprises

The Protoform Sessions is a soundtrack by composer Vince DiCola. It was first released at the BotCon 2001 convention exclusive. But, it is now commercially available to buy. The album is a collection of early demos, out-takes and alternative themes from The Transformers: The Movie music score. Included are intro tracks called "Transitions" that include commentary by Vince DiCola himself. As he explains, these early recordings were produced with instrumentation that was of lower quality than that which would be heard in the final film.

Track listing:

1. Greetings from Vince
2. Unicron's Theme (demo)
3. Transition #1
4. TF:TM Title Theme (Ed Fruge version) (0:50)
5. Transition #2
6. TF:TM Title Theme (Gary Falcone version)
7. Transition #3
8. Attack on the Shuttle (demo) (2:16)
9. Transition #4
10. Matrix Theme (2:19)
11. Transition #5
12. Dare (Gary Falcone demo) (3:59)
13. Transition #6
14. Escape (demo)
15. Transition #7
16. No Mercy (unused TFTM song piece) (3:39)
17. Transition #8
18. Evil Decepticon Theme (unused TFTM song piece) (1:22)
19. Transition #9
20. Legacy (demo)
21. Transition #10
22. Gone Fishin' Suite (3:59)
23. Transition #11
24. Attack on the Shuttle (BotCon 1997 concert rehearsal version)
25. Transition #12
26. Death of Optimus Prime Suite (BotCon 1997 concert rehearsal version)
27. Transition #13
28. Dare Suite (BotCon 1997 concert rehearsal version) (15:12)
- After the "Dare Suite", there is a hidden extra suite performance of the Rocky IV score tracks, "War" and "Montage".

=== Artistic Transformations: Themes and Variations ===
Artistic Transformations: Themes and Variations

Soundtrack album by Vince DiCola
- Released: 2001
- Genre: Soundtrack
- Label: 3H Enterprises

Artistic Transformations: Themes and Variations is a compilation soundtrack made up of music from The Transformers: The Movie all performed on piano by the film's composer Vince DiCola. It was first released as an exclusive at the 2001 BotCon convention. However, it is now commercially available.

Track listing:

1. "Unicron's Theme"
2. "2005"
3. "Attack on the Shuttle"
4. "Gone Fishin'"
5. "Autobot/Decepticon Battle"
6. "City Under Siege/Showdown"
7. "Death of Optimus Prime"
8. "Contest for Leadership"
9. "The Suite"
10. "Dare (excerpts)"

== Compilations ==
=== Transformers: Theme Song Collection ===
Transformers: Theme Song Collection

Soundtrack album by Various Artists
- Released: August 20, 2003
- Genre: Anime
- Length: Disc 1 60:02; Disc 2 60:02
- Language: Japanese
- Label: Columbia Music Entertainment, inc.

Transformers: Theme Song Collection (トランスフォーマー テーマソング・コレクション, Toransufōmā Tēma Songu Korekushion)is a two disc CD soundtrack . It was released by Columbia Music Entertainment on August 20, 2003 in Japan Only. This set features the Japanese theme songs, opening and closing, that span all of the G1, Beast era, Car Robots, and Micron Legend TV series.

Disc One:

1. TRANSFORMER
  トランスフォーマー
2. Peace Again
  ピース・アゲン
3. TRANSFORMER 2010
  トランスフォーマー2010
4. WHAT'S YOU
  ホワッツ・ユー
5. ザ・ヘッドマスターズ
  Za Heddomasutāzu / The Headmasters
6. 君はトランスフォーマー
  Kimi wa Toransufōmā / You are a Transformer
7. 超神マスターフォースのテーマ
  Chôjin Masutāfōsu no Tēma / Theme of Super God Masterforce
8. 燃えろ!トランスフォーマー
  Moero! Toransufōmā / Burn! Transformer
9. トランスフォーマーV(ビクトリー)
  Toransufōmā V (Bikutorī) / Transformer V (Victory)
10. サイバトロンばんざい
  Saibatoron Banzai / Cybertron Banzai, a.k.a. Hooray for the Autobots
11. トランスフォーマーZのテーマ
  Toransufōmā Z no Tēma / Theme of Transformer Z (Zone)
12. 未来の君へ
  Mirai no ni Mukau / Head For the Future
13. WAR WAR! STOP IT
14. FOR THE DREAM
15. GET MY FUTURE
16. SUPER VOYAGER
17. 夢のいる場所
  Yume no Iru Bashyo / Where the Dreams Are
18. SPACE DREAMER―遥かなるビーストウォーズ―
  SPACE DREAMER-Kanaru Bīsuto Wōzu- / Space Dreamer: Distant Beast Wars
19. MY SHOOTING STAR

Disc Two:

1. 始まりの唄
  Hajimari no Uta / Song of the Beginning
2. 果てしないこの宇宙(SORA)へ
  Hateshinai kono (Sora) e / To the Never-ending Skies
3. Hello！タフネス
  Hello! Tafunesu / Hello! Toughness
4. Love For Ever ―君を守るために―
  Love For Ever-Kimi o Mamoru Tame ni- / Love for Ever: To Protect You
5. 手の中の宇宙
  Teno Naka no Uchū / The Universe in Your Hands
6. あの夢の彼方へ
  Ano Yume no Kanata e / Off to That Dream
7. WA! WA! ワンダーランド
  Wa! Wa! Wandārando / Wa! Wa! Wonderland
8. 魂のエヴォリューション
  Tamashii no Evoryūshon / Evolution of Spirit
9. 千年のソルジャー
  Sen-nen no Sorujā / Millennium Soldier
10. バ・ビ・ブ・べ ビーストウォーズ
  Ba Bi Bu Be Bīsuto Wōzu / BA-BI-BU-BE Beast Wars
11. HALLELUYAH
12. 炎のオーバードライブ ～カーロボットサイバトロン～
  Honō no Ōbādoraibu ~Kārobotto Seibatoron~ / Blaze the Overdrive: Car Robot Cybertron
13. マリオネット
  Marionette
14. TRANSFORMER -Dream Again-
15. Never Ending Road
16. Transformers ～鋼鉄の勇気～
  TRANSFORMERS~Kôtetsu no Yūki~ / Transformers: Steel of Courage
17. Don't Give Up!!

=== Transformers: History of Music 1984–1990 ===
Transformers: History of Music 1984–1990

Soundtrack album by Various Artists
- Released: March 31, 2004
- Genre: Anime
- Length: Disc 1: 60:01; Disc 2: 60:02; Disc 3: 60:03; Disc 4: 60:00; Disc 5: 60:00
- Language: Japanese
- Label: Columbia Music Entertainment

Transformers: History of Music 1984–1990 (changed from the original Japanese title of 超ロボット生命体トランスフォーマー) is a five disc soundtrack boxset. It was released by Columbia Music Entertainment on March 31, 2004 in Japan only. As the title suggests, the set spans all of the Japanese G1 series. Including theme songs with corresponding karaoke versions, image score inspired by Fight! Super Robot Lifeform by composer Shiro Sagisu which was previously released in Japan as "Transformers: Original Soundtrack" in 1984. Scores straight from Headmasters, Masterforce, by composer Ishida Katsunori. Plus the Victory and Zone score which was by Michiaki Watanabe. However, this set does include the first two versions of the US opening theme song by Anne Bryant and the suites to two of the 1984 and 1985 US toy commercials. But these theme songs include their sound effects that played along with the song. Unfortunately, the original score from the "More Than Meets The Eye" series by composer Robert J. Walsh is absent from this set.

Disc One:

1. 4TH DIMENSION
2. GRUESOME WARS
3. TRANSFORMER
4. CAR WALKIN’
5. CYBERTRON I
6. PEACE OF MIND
7. SPINNIN’
8. CYBERTRON II
9. YOU CAN FIGHT
10. MEChANICAL VOICE
11. BATTLE
12. WHO’S GOD
13. CHASE
14. DESTRON
  Decepticon
15. PEACE AGAIN
16. FUTURIST’S DREAM
17. TRANSFORMER(TV SIZE)
18. Peace Again(TV SIZE)
19. TRANSFORMER(OFF VOCAL VERSION)
20. Peace Again(OFF VOCAL VERSION)
21. TRANSFORMER2010(TV SIZE)
22. ウルトラマグナスの歌唱指導 I
  Urutora Magunasu no Kashôshidô Wan/Ultra Magnus' Song of Leadership I
23. TRANSFORMER2010(OFF VOCAL VERSION)
24. WHAT’S YOU(TV SIZE)
25. ウルトラマグナスの歌唱指導 II
  Urutora Magunasu no Kashôshidô Tzu/Ultra Magnus' Song of Leadership II
26. WHAT’S YOU(OFF VOCAL VERSION)

Disc Two:

1. ザ・ヘッドマスターズ
  Za Heddomasutāzu/The Headmasters
2. 僕等のヘッドマスター
  Bokutō no Heddomasutāzu/Of Our Headmasters
3. TRANSFORM!
4. 臆病者同盟
  Okubyômomo Dômei/Coward Alliance
5. 戦士の休息
  Senshi no Yasumi/Rest of a Warrior
6. 立て!怒りのヘッドマスター
  Tatsu! Ikari no Heddomasutāzu/Stand! Anger of a Headmaster
7. 宇宙には国境がない
  Uchū ni wa Kokkyō ga Nai/A Universe Without Borders
8. デストロン讃歌
  Destron Sanka/Decepticon Hymn
9. 宇宙に架かる虹
  Uchū ni Kakaru Niji/A Rainbow Hanging in Space
10. 君はトランスフォーマー
  Kimi wa Toransufōmā/You are a Transformer
11. ザ・ヘッドマスターズ(OFF VOCAL VERSION)
  Za Heddomasutāzu/The Headmasters
12. TRANSFORM!(OFF VOCAL VERSION)
13. 臆病者同盟(OFF VOCAL VERSION)
  Okubyômomo Dômei/Coward Alliance
14. 戦士の休息(OFF VOCAL VERSION)
  Senshi no Yasumi/Rest of a Warrior
15. 立て!怒りのヘッドマスター(OFF VOCAL VERSION)
  Tatsu! Ikari no Heddomasutāzu/Stand! Anger of a Headmaster
16. 宇宙には国境がない(OFF VOCAL VERSION)
  Uchū ni wa Kokkyō ga Nai/A Universe Without Borders
17. デストロン讃歌(OFF VOCAL VERSION)
  Destron Sanka/Decepticon Hymn
18. 宇宙に架かる虹(OFF VOCAL VERSION)
  Uchū ni Kakaru Niji/A Rainbow Hanging in Space
19. 君はトランスフォーマー(OFF VOCAL VERSION)
  Kimi wa Toransufōmā/You are a Transformer

Disc Three:

1. 超神マスターフォースのテーマ
  Chôjin Masutāfōsu no Tēma/Theme of Super God Masterforce
2. 進め!超神マスターフォース
  Shinpo! Chôjin Masutāfōsu/Advance! Super God Masterforce
3. 奇跡のトランスフォーマー
  Kiseki no Toransufōmā/Transformer of Miracles
4. 変身!ゴッドマスター
  Henshin! Goddomasutā/Transform! God Master
5. 小さな勇士~ヘッドマスターJRのテーマ~
  Chiisai Senshi~Heddomasutāzu JR no Tēma~/Little Warrior: Theme of Headmasters JR
6. スーパージンライのテーマ
  Sūpā Ginrai no Tēma/Theme of Super Ginrai
7. See See シーコンズ
  See See Sīkonzu/See See Seacon
8. 宇宙の支配者・デビルZ
  Uchū no Shihaisha: Debiru Z/Ruler of the Universe: Devil Z
9. WE BELIEVE TOMORROW
10. 燃えろ!トランスフォーマー
  Moero! Toransufōmā/Burn! Transformer
11. 超神マスターフォースのテーマ(OFF VOCAL VERSION)
  Chôjin Masutāfōsu no Tēma/Theme of Super God Masterforce
12. 進め!超神マスターフォース(OFF VOCAL VERSION)
  Shinpo! Chôjin Masutāfōsu/Advance! Super God Masterforce
13. 奇跡のトランスフォーマー(OFF VOCAL VERSION)
  Kiseki no Toransufōmā/Transformer of Miracles
14. 変身!ゴッドマスター(OFF VOCAL VERSION)Henshin! Goddomasutā/Transform! God Master
15. 小さな勇士~ヘッドマスターJRのテーマ~(OFF VOCAL VERSION)
  Chiisai Senshi~Heddomasutâzu JR no Tēma~/Little Warrior: Theme of Headmasters JR
16. スーパージンライのテーマ(OFF VOCAL VERSION)Sūpā Ginrai no Tēma/Theme of Super Ginrai
17. See See シーコンズ(OFF VOCAL VERSION)
  See See Sīkonzu/See See Seacon
18. 宇宙の支配者・デビルZ(OFF VOCAL VERSION)
  Uchū no Shihaisha: Debiru Z/Ruler of the Universe: Devil Z
19. WE BELIEVE TOMORROW(OFF VOCAL VERSION)
20. 燃えろ!トランスフォーマー(OFF VOCAL VERSION)
  Moero! Toransufōmā/Burn! Transformer

Disc Four:

1. ザ・ヘッドマスターズ(TV SIZE)
  Za Heddomasutāzu/The Headmasters
2. 西暦2011年
  Seireki 2011 Nen/Year 2011 AD
3. マトリクスを探せ!
  Matorikusu o Sagasu!/Look for the Matrix!
4. 夢のダブルコンボイ誕生
  Yume no Daburu Konboi Tanjô/Dream of the Birth of Double Convoy
5. ヘッドオン!!フォートレスマキシマス
  Hetudo On!! Fōtoresu Makisimasu/Head On! Fortress Maximus
6. ザ・ヘッドマスターズ(INSTRUMENTAL VERSION)
  Za Heddomasutāzu/The Headmasters
7. 戦え!フォートレスマキシマス
  Tatakai! Fōtoresu Makisimasu/Fight! Fortress Maximus
8. 君はトランスフォーマー(INSTRUMENTAL VERSION)
  Kimi wa Toransufōmā/You are a Transformer
9. デストロン最終計画発動
  Destron Saishū Keikaku Ugoki/Decepticons Final Plan Goes Into Action
10. 最後の地球大決戦
  Saigo no Chikyū Kettei-teki Tatakai/Last of Earth's Decisive Battles
11. 予告編用音楽
  Yokoku-hen yô Ongaku/Music for Preview
12. 君はトランスフォーマー(TV SIZE)
  Kimi wa Toransufōmā/You are a Transformer
13. 超神マスターフォースのテーマ(TV SIZE)
  Chôjin Masutāfōsu no Tēma/Theme of Super God Masterforce
14. デストロン復活
  Destron Fukkatsu/Decepticon Revival
15. 燃えろ!トランスフォーマー(INSTRUMENTAL VERSION)
  Moero! Toransufōmā/Burn! Transformer
16. 立て!!プリテンダー
  Tatsu!! Puritendā/Stand! Pretender
17. 超神マスターフォースのテーマ(INSTRUMENTAL VERSION)
  Chôjin Masutāfōsu no Tēma/Theme of Super God Masterforce
18. その名はジンライ
  Sono na ha Ginrai/His Name is Ginrai
19. ジンライ怒りのゴッドオン!!
  Ginrai Ikari no Gotudo On!!/Angry God on of Ginrai!!
20. 月面の死闘
  Desperate Struggle on the Surface of Moon
21. 竒跡のトランスフォーマー(INSTRUMENTAL VERSION)
  Kiseki no Toransufōmā/Transformer of Miracles
22. ゴッドジンライの帰還
  Gotudo Ginrai no Kitaku/Return of God Ginrai
23. 戦闘......そして
  Sentô...Sosite/Battle...and then
24. 進め!超神マスターフォース(INSTRUMENTAL VERSION)Susume! Chōjin Masutāfōsu/Advance! Super God Masterforce
25. ファイナルファイヤーガッツ!
  Fuainaru Fuaiyā Gatusu/Final Fire Guts!
26. 予告編用音楽
  Yokoku-hen yô Ongaku/Music for Previews
27. 燃えろ!トランスフォーマー(TV SIZE)
  Moero! Toransufōmā/Burn! Transformer

Disc Five:

1. トランスフォーマーV(TV SIZE)
  Toransufōmā V/Transformer V
2. 宇宙の勇者・スターセイバー
  Uchū no Yūsha Sutā Seibā/Star Saber: Hero of the Universe
3. ビクトリー戦争開始!
  Bikutorī Sensô Kaishiten!/Victory War, Start!
4. マイクロ星・謎の戦士
  Maikuro-sei Nazo no Senshi/Micron Planet: Warriors of Mystery
5. 合体!ライオカイザー
  Gattai! Raio Kaizā/Unite! Lio Kaizer
6. ビクトリーレオ誕生
  Bikutorī Reo Tanjô/Birth of Victory Leo
7. 逆転!必殺のビクトリー合体
  Gyakuten! Hissatsu no Bikutorī Gattai/Inversion! Final Blow of the Victory Unite
8. デストロン巨大要塞
  Destron Kyodai Yôsai/ Decepticon Giant Fort
9. スターセイバーVSデスザラス
  Sutā Seibā VS Desuzarasu/Star Saber VS Deathsaurus
10. トランスフォーマーV(INSTRUMENTAL VERSION)
  Toransufomā V/Transformer V
11. サイバトロンばんざい(INSTRUMENTAL VERSION)
  Saibatoron Banzai/Cybertron Banzai
12. 勝利のスターセイバー
  Shôri no Sutā Seibā/Victory of Star Saber
13. サイバトロンばんざい(TV SIZE)
  Saibatoron Banzai/Cybertron Banzai
14. トランスフォーマーV(OFF VOCAL VERSION)
  Toransufōmā V/Transformer V
15. サイバトロンばんざい(OFF VOCAL VERSION)
  Saibatoron Banzai/Cybertron Banzai
16. トランスフォーマーZのテーマ(ONE CHORUS VERSION)
  Toransufōmā Z no Tēma/Theme of Transformer Z
17. 未来の君へ(ONE CHORUS VERSION)
  Mirai no ni Mukau/Head For the Future
18. トランスフォーマーZのテーマ(INSTRUMENTAL VERSION)
  Toransufōmā Z no Tēma/Theme of Transformer Z
19. 未来の君へ(INSTRUMENTAL VERSION)
  Mirai no ni Mukau/Head For the Future
20. トランスフォーマーZのテーマ(OFF VOCAL VERSION)
  Toransufōmā Z no Tēma/Theme of Transformer Z
21. 未来の君へ(OFF VOCAL VERSION)
  Mirai no ni Mukau/Head For the Future
22. THE TRANSFORMERS(VERSION 1)
23. THE TRANSFORMERS(VERSION 2)
24. THE TRANSFORMERS TVCF用音楽(VERSION 1)
25. THE TRANSFORMERS TVCF用音楽(VERSION 2)
26. SURVIVAL

=== Transformers: Song Universe ===
Transformers: Song Universe

Soundtrack album by Various Artist
- Released: August 8, 2007
- Genre: Anime
- Length: Disc 1 58:07; Disc 2 67:03; Disc 3 75:64; Disc 4 72:35; Disc 5 74:58
- Language: Japanese
- Label: Columbia Music Entertainment

Transformers: Song Universe (トランスフォーマー･ソング･ユニバース, Toransufōmā Songu Yunibāsu) is a five disc compilation soundtrack box set. It was released by Columbia Music Entertainment, inc. on August 8, 2007 in Japan only. Unlike the previous set History of Music which focuses on compositions from the G1 series this set contains every Japanese vocal song from G1 through Galaxy Force along with the then recent "Kiss Players♥" radio dramas and karaoke versions of the featured theme songs and bonus songs that were exclusive to each theme song's single release. Its release coincided with the live action Transformers film's Japanese release.

Disc One:

1. Transformer
2. Peace Again
3. Transformer 2010
4. What's You
5. ザ・ヘッドマスターズ
  Za Heddomasutāzu/The Headmasters
6. 僕等のヘッドマスター
  Bokutō no Heddomasutāzu/Of Our Headmasters
7. Transform!
8. 臆病者同盟
  Okubyōmono Dōmei/Coward's Alliance
9. 戦士の休息
  Senshi no Kyūsoku/The Soldier's Rest
10. 立て!怒りのヘッドマスター
  Tate! Ikari no Heddomasutāzu/Stand! The Angry Headmasters
11. 宇宙には国境がない
  Uchū ni wa Kokkyō ga Nai/A Universe Without Borders
12. デストロン讃歌
  Destron Sanka/Decepticon Hymn
13. 宇宙に架かる虹
  Uchū ni Kakaru Niji/A Rainbow Hanging in Space
14. 君はトランスフォーマー
  Kimi wa Toransufōmā/You Are a Transformer
15. TRANSFORMER～トランスフォーマーキスぷれバージョン～
  Transformer~Toransufōmā Kisu Pure Bājion~/Transformer: Transformer Kiss Players Version

Disc Two:

1. 超神マスターフォースのテーマ
  Chōjin Masutāfōsu no Tēma/Theme of Super God Masterforce
2. 進め!超神マスターフォース
  Susume! Chōjin Masutāfōsu/Advance! Super God Masterforce
3. 奇跡のトランスフォーマー
  Kiseki no Toransufōmā/Transformer of Miracles
4. 変身!ゴッドマスター
  Henshin! Goddomasutā/Transform! God Master
5. 小さな勇士～ヘットマスターJRのテーマ～
  Chiisana Yūshi~Heddomasutāzu Junia no Tēma~/Little Brave Warriors: Theme of Headmasters Jr.
6. スーパージンライのテーマ
  Supā Jinrai no Tēma/Theme of Super Ginrai
7. See See シーコンズ
  See See Sīkonzu/See See Seacons
8. 宇宙の支配者・デビルZ
  Uchū no Shihaisha Debiru Zetto/Ruler of the Universe Devil Z
9. WE BELIEVE TOMORROW
10. 燃えろ!トランスフォーマー
  Moero! Toransufōmā/Burn! Transformer
11. トランスフォーマーV
  Toransufōmā Bi/Transformer V
12. サイバトロンばんざい
  Saibatoron Banzai/Autobots Banzai
13. トランスフォーマーZのテーマ
  Toransufōmā Zetto no Tēma/Theme of Transformer Z
14. 未来の君へ
  Ashita no Kimi e/To the You of Tomorrow
15. War War! Stop It
16. Can We Play Off
17. For the Dream
18. For the Dream (Extended super remix)

Disc Three:

1. Get My Future
2. Silent Moon
3. Super Voyager
4. Thank You, Mama
5. 夢のいる場所
  Yume no Iro Basho/The Place Where Dreams Are
6. こんな気持ち
  Konna Kimochi/Such Feelings
7. Get My Future (Full Power Trance Mix)
8. Super Voyager (Universal Doctor Mix)
9. Space Dreamer ～遥かなるビーストウォーズ～
  Space Dreamer~Haruka naru Bīsuto Wōzu~/Space Dreamer: Distant Beast Wars
10. My Shooting Star
11. 始まりの唄
  Hajimari no Uta/Song of The Beginning
12. 果てしないこの宇宙へ
  Hateshinai no Kono Sora E/Toward This Neverending Sky
13. Hello!タフネス
  Hello! Tafunesu/Hello! Toughness
14. Love For Ever ～君を守るために～
  Love For Ever~Kimi wo Mamoru Tame ni~/Love Forever: In Order to Protect You
15. Da Da Da
16. 手の中の宇宙
  Te no Naka no Uchū/The Universe in My Hand
17. magique musique

Disc Four:

1. あの夢の彼方へ
  Ano Yume no Kanata e/To That Dream Over There
2. WA! WA! ワンダーランド
  Wa! Wa! Wandārando/Wa! Wa! Wonderland
3. 魂のエヴォリューション
  Tamashii no Evoryūshon/Evolution of the Soul
4. バ・ビ・ブ・ベ ビーストウォーズ
  Ba Bi Bu Be Bīsuto Wōzu/Ba Bi Bu Be Beast Wars
5. 千年のソルジャー
  Sennen no Sorujā/Soldier of the Millennium
6. Halleluyah
7. 炎のオーバードライブ～カーロボットサイバトロン～
  Honō no Ōbādoraibu~Kārobotto Saibatoron~/Blaze the Overdrive: Car Robot Cybertron
8. 君色の未来
  Kimi Iro no Yume/The Future of Your Colors
9. マリオネット
  Marionetto/Marionette
10. Midnight Cinderella
11. TRANSFORMER-Dream Again
12. 胸いっぱいの・・・
  Mune Ippai no.../Chest Full of...
13. Never Ending Road
14. No Name Heroes
15. Transformers～鋼鉄の勇気～
  Transformers~Kōtetsu no Yūki~/Transformers: Steel of Courage
16. Don't Give Up!
17. SURVIVAL

Disc Five:

1. 太陽のtransform!!
  Taiyō no Transform!!/Solar Transform!!
2. Calling you
3. Call You ・・・君と僕の未来
  Call You... Kimi to Boku no Mirai/Call You... The Future of Me and You
4. いつも
  Itsumo/Always
5. Ignition -イグニッション!
  Ignition-Igunisshon!/Ignition: Ignition!
6. Growing up!!
7. メガトロン音頭
  Megatoron Ondo/Megatron March
8. War War! Stop It オリジナル・カラオケ）
  War War! Stop It (Orijinaru Karaoke)/War War! Stop It (Original Karaoke)
9. For the Dream（オリジナル・カラオケ）
  For the Dream (Orijinaru Karaoke)/For the Dream (Original Karaoke)
10. Get My Future（オリジナル・カラオケ）
  Get My Future (Orijinaru Karaoke)/Get My Future (Original Karaoke)
11. Super Voyager（オリジナル・カラオケ）
  Super Voyager (Orijinaru Karaoke)/Super Voyager (Original Karaoke)
12. 夢のいる場所 （オリジナル・カラオケ）
  Yume no Iro Basho (Orijinaru Karaoke)/The Place Where Dreams Are (Original Karaoke)
13. Love For Ever ～君を守るために～ （オリジナル・カラオケ）
  Love For Ever~Kimi wo Mamoru Tame Ni~(Orizinaru Karaoke)/Love Forever: In Order to Protect You (Original Karaoke)
14. 手の中の宇宙 （オリジナル・カラオケ）
  Te no Naka no Uchū (Orijinaru Karaoke)/The Universe in My Hand (Original Karaoke)
15. 魂のエヴォリューション （オリジナル・カラオケ）
  Tamashii no Evoryūshon (Orizinaru Karaoke)/Evolution of the Soul (Original Karaoke)
16. バ・ビ・ブ・ベ ビーストウォーズ （オリジナル・カラオケ）
  Ba Bi Bu Be Bīsuto Wōzu (Orizinaru Karaoke)/Ba Bi Bu Be Beast Wars (Original Karaoke)
17. 千年のソルジャー （オリジナル・カラオケ）
  Sennen no Sorujā (Orijinaru Karaoke)/Soldier of the Millennium (Original Karaoke)
18. Halleluyah（オリジナル・カラオケ）
  Halleluyah (Orijinaru Karaoke)/Halleluyah (Original Karaoke)

== Live-action film series ==
- Transformers: The Album
- Transformers: The Score
- Transformers: Revenge of the Fallen – The Album
- Transformers: Revenge of the Fallen – The Score
- Transformers: Dark of the Moon – The Album
- Transformers: Dark of the Moon – The Score
- Transformers: Age of Extinction – The Score
- Transformers: The Last Knight – Music from the Motion Picture
- Bumblebee (soundtrack)
- Transformers: Rise of the Beasts (soundtrack)
