= Transformers: The Score =

Film score by Steve Jablonsky
- Released: October 9, 2007
- Recorded: April 2007
- Studio: Remote Control Productions
- Genre: Film score
- Length: 59:57
- Label: Warner Bros.
- Producer: Steve Jablonsky

Professional ratings
Review scores
Source	Rating
iTunes	4.5/5 stars

A short excerpt from Track Seven - "Bumblebee"; this track is stylistically representative of much of the score.

Transformers: The Score is a soundtrack that features the musical score composed and arranged by Steve Jablonsky, conducted by Nick Glennie-Smith and performed by the Hollywood Studio Symphony for the 2007 film Transformers. It was released October 9, 2007, on Jablonsky's 37th birthday and exactly one week before the film's DVD release date. According to the back of the CD cover, 11 of the 20 tracks are arranged differently from what is heard in the actual film, resulting in extended but accurately complete soundtracks.

== History ==
Transformers: The Album did not contain any of the instrumental music (score) composed and arranged by Steve Jablonsky featured in the movie, instead featuring only 12 songs from various rap and rock music groups; four of those songs did not even appear in the film itself. Sony Music Entertainment announced early in July 2007 that, "at this time, there are no immediate plans regarding the release of the Transformers soundtrack score". This received criticism from some fans of the movie. An unofficial online petition was set up at The Knight Shift to persuade Sony Records to release just Jablonsky's score as a CD soundtrack. (Warner Bros. Records, however, actually owned the rights to the music.) At the end of the opening month for Transformers in July 2007, the petition had over two thousand signatures. At the end of August, when Warner Bros. Records announced that a CD containing the score was going to be released (only two months after the petition had been created), 5,505 signatures had been registered.

On July 25, 2007, Chandra Cogburn, the score engineer who worked on the Transformers score, announced via email to The Knight Shift that "there will be an album of Transformers score coming out soon. I do not know the details, as I am not working on it. Thanks so much for appreciating the music, and all our hard work!..." On August 6, 2007, Sony BMG Customer Service confirmed in an e-mail that they "...have no information because this is not a Sony BMG release". Also, Diamond Select confirmed not to be associated with a score release on the 2007 score. According to Michael Bay's official website in late July 2007, there were plans to release the score sometime in the future, though probably not by Sony Music since this was a Paramount/DreamWorks film. The possible source of this confusion may be that Sony owns the rights to the 1986 Transformers animated film, but they do not own the rights to the 2007 Transformers live-action film. Thus, previously mentioned Sony releases may refer to the 1986 score.

On August 26, 2007, The Knight Shift first reported and confirmed that Transformers: The Score would be released on October 9, 2007, by Warner Bros. Records. On September 2, 2007, Steve Jablonsky submitted an e-mail to the owner of The Knight Shift, thanking the website and everyone who signed the petition for their support. In the message, he mentioned that a CD containing his music was always in the works, but had simply taken longer to get out. This message can be found on the front page of the online petition, though it was not along the inside of the cover art for the soundtrack disc itself as was rumored before its release.

Steve Jablonsky's score was released on October 9, 2007, where it debuted as the 32nd best selling album on Amazon.com and was the third best selling soundtrack. For unknown reasons, the score just as quickly went out of print, causing prices to skyrocket as scalpers cashed in on the overwhelming demand. Bootleg copies also popped up occasionally on online auctions and dealers. A second petition requesting a reissue of the score from Warner Bros. Records was initiated on April 24, 2008, in view of the high demand for this album. On the first day alone, over 100 signatures were logged.

The score continues to be available for purchase online from the iTunes Store and from Amazon.com's MP3 store, as well as streaming on Spotify.

== CD track listing ==
#	Title	Key Scenes/Notes	Duration
1	"Autobots"	The extended introduction theme accompanying Optimus Prime's narration explaining the origins of the All Spark Cube as the viewer sees it fall to Earth thousands of years before the events of the film. Portions of this track are also used in the scene where naval ships are deployed at sea during Defense Secretary John Keller's debriefing.	2:33
2	"Decepticons"	Parts of this track are used throughout the film to emphasize the threat of the Decepticons, even if they are not seen on-screen. It is primarily heard in full when Frenzy infiltrates Air Force One to hack the U.S. Defense Network. Also played when Defense Secretary Keller is briefed by Agent Banachek at the NMCC, and when Agent Banachek leads the group at the Hoover Dam into the area where Megatron is being held. There is no pause between this track and the next, so the echoing last note carries for 1–2 seconds into track #3. (It is incorrectly assumed that this track is used for when Starscream mobilizes the other Decepticons; that is an unreleased piece of music).	3:51
3	"The All Spark"	Sam Witwicky, Mikaela Banes, and all of the other major human characters are introduced to the giant All Spark Cube hidden inside Hoover Dam.	3:34
4	"Deciphering the Signal"	Defense Secretary John Keller debriefs Congress on the mysteriously fatal attack in Qatar, and reveals a foreign communication signal as their only clue. It is also used in the Chevrolet Autobot Headquarters website. The track includes solos by Martin Tillman.	3:08
5	"Frenzy"	The main human characters gather inside a locked room inside Hoover Dam and witness the power of the All Spark Cube to create (and destroy) Cybertronian life. (The character Frenzy actually does not appear until the next scene, after this music has ended. The title of the track may, instead, refer to the crazed and uncontrollable actions of the tiny "newborn" Cybertronian inside the hardened glass box. Hints of the Decepticons theme can be heard but is noticeably changed).	1:56
6	"Optimus"	The Autobots retreat to the Griffith Observatory after Bumblebee, Sam Witwicky and Mikaela Banes are captured by Sector-7 agents. Here, Optimus Prime confirms the location of the All Spark. The beginning portion of the track is also played when Sam and Mikaela talk to Bumblebee after his fight with Barricade. During both scenes, the flute heard in the album track is not used, and the guitar heard in the background is not used in the Observatory scene. The opening portion of the track with the flute solo is used as the ending theme for the Transformers: Beginnings video (an adaptation of the Transformers: Movie Prequel).	3:15
7	"Bumblebee"	Heard primarily when Bumblebee is freed from confinement inside Hoover Dam, and is taken to the All Spark where he shrinks it down. Parts of this track are also played when Bumblebee shatters the windows of the other used cars at Bobby Bolivia's lot, and during his fight against Barricade. The music is reflective of its usage in the film; it builds and builds, culminating in a full-orchestra version of an extension of the melody from "The All Spark".	3:58
8	"SOCCENT Attack"	Blackout and Scorponok attack the SOCCENT U.S. military base in Qatar. Also used when Megatron breaks free from his frozen state inside the Hoover Dam and escapes outside the Dam.	2:07
9	"Sam at the Lake"	Sam Witwicky goes with his friend Miles and meet up with Mikaela Banes and their classmates. Part of it is also used before this when he first returns home after purchasing his car (actually Bumblebee) and is checking his eBay auctions.	1:59
10	"Scorponok"	The showdown between Scorponok and the surviving U.S. soldiers at a small desert village in Qatar. Also used in part when Frenzy breaks into the alien archives through the air ducts inside the Hoover Dam and when the Autobots drive to Mission City. It is also used in Transformers: Revenge of the Fallen, when NEST enters Egypt and Capt. Lennox pushes Theodore Galloway out. (The title of the track is misspelled "Skorpinok" in the electronic listings inside the CD itself, but appears normally on the CD cover and case booklet).	4:57
11	"Cybertron"	Optimus Prime tells Sam Witwicky and Mikaela Banes the history of the planet Cybertron, where the Transformers come from, and how Captain Witwicky found Megatron and went insane afterwards. The beginning portion of the track is played when Mikaela tells Sam about why she was called a "criminal" after unlocking his handcuffs.	2:46
12	"Arrival to Earth"	The Autobots enter Earth's atmosphere and assume their alternate modes before rendezvousing with Bumblebee, Sam Witwicky and Mikaela Banes. A portion is played when the signal decipherers are being briefed by the Secretary of Defense at The Pentagon. Also, the first 20 seconds of the track [up to where the stringed instruments take over from the choir] are played when Sam first talks about Captain Witwicky's Arctic Circle expedition. It is also used in Transformers: Revenge of the Fallen, when Optimus Prime arrives in Shanghai and in the "Matrix of Leadership" track of the film's score. Also used in the "There is No Plan" track from Transformers: Dark of the Moon – The Score, in "The Legend Exists" track from Transformers: Age of Extinction – The Score and at the end of "Your Voice" from Transformers: The Last Knight – Music from the Motion Picture.	5:26
13	"Witwicky"	Though broken into several sequential parts in the film, it is heard primarily at the beginning of the scene where the Autobots hide in the Witwicky backyard- particularly from when Sam's dad confronts him on the back porch, up to when Sam runs into the house with Mojo. (The title of the track is misspelled "Whitwicky" in the electronic listings inside the CD itself, but appears normally on the CD cover and case booklet. Ironically, a running gag through the film is various characters mispronouncing the name Witwicky).	1:57
14	"Downtown Battle"	The Air Force is preparing to launch for Mission City upon orders from Secretary Keller, and when the Sector 7 vehicles & Autobots arrive there. Also used when Starscream fires upon the group of humans and Autobots.	1:33
15	"Sector 7"	The Autobots help Sam Witwicky and Mikaela Banes escape from Sector 7's clutches and run off. (Tracks # 15 and 16 are actually one song which is 4:25 min long that is broken into two separate tracks. Hence, there is no pause between them).	2:05
16	"Bumblebee Captured"	Bumblebee is captured after he saves Sam Witwicky and Mikaela Banes, who both slipped and fell off Optimus Prime while hiding under a bridge.	2:17
17	"You're a Soldier Now"	Megatron arrives and Jazz attempts to hold him off; Mikaela Banes brings a tow truck to help Bumblebee; Sam Witwicky is told by Captain William Lennox to run with the All Spark away to an old abandoned building; Optimus Prime arrives in the city after being delayed by Bonecrusher on the highway.	3:27
18	"Sam on the Roof"	Sam Witwicky is cornered by Megatron on the roof of an old abandoned building after Starscream shoots down the Black Hawk helicopter sent to receive the All Spark from him.	2:02
19	"Optimus vs. Megatron"	The final showdown between Optimus Prime and Megatron in the city. Blackout is also destroyed by Captain William Lennox and some F-22s during this scene, and Starscream attacks the Air Force's incoming Raptors.	3:59
20	"No Sacrifice, No Victory"	The surviving Autobots collect themselves together at the end of the Mission City battle, paying thanks to the humans, and Secretary Keller announces that Sector 7 is to be disbanded, with the remains of the Decepticons will be sunken at the bottom of the Laurentian Abyss. Also used in the "I Rise, You Fall" track from Transformers: Revenge of the Fallen – The Score, "There is No Plan" track from Transformers: Dark of the Moon – The Score' and "Calling All Autobots" track from "Transformers: The Last Knight - Music from the Motion Picture".	2:57

Tracks 1, 2, 3, 4, 5, 6, 7, 10, 12, 18, and 20 are marked (*) on the CD cover, case backing, and inner booklet with a subtext of "different version in film". This may refer to the fact that these tracks, though complete on the CD as originally scored, are not heard in their entirety in the film or are broken up.

=== Other unreleased music ===
Approximately one month before its release, ten soundtracks were provided free of charge as a downloadable file over the Internet, requiring the use of DirectX software to be heard. However, with the exception of the track that would become Track #19: "Optimus vs. Megatron", they were all altered, shortened, or mixed-together and of what would be released onto the official CD, though indeed containing original score music heard in the film:

- Aftermath (Track #20: "No Sacrifice, No Victory")
- Blackout Attacks (Track #8: "SOCCENT Attack")
- Bumblebee Captured (Track #16: "Bumblebee Captured")
- Scorponok (Track #10: "Scorponok")
- The Final Battle (Track #17: "You're a Soldier Now")
- The Final Battle, Part 2 (Track #19: "Optimus vs. Megatron")

Four tracks included in this file were not included in any way at all in the official CD release:

- "Autobots to the Rescue" – played right after Optimus Prime rips the roof off a Sector 7 truck, and all of the Autobots come to take Sam Witwicky and Mikaela Banes away.
- "Barricade" – played during the scene where Decepticon Barricade confronts Sam Witwicky in the parking lot overpass, and Bumblebee arrives to carry him and Mikaela Banes away from the police car 'monster'.
- "Bumble-Stumble" – just after Starscream shoots at the Autobots in Mission City and Bumblebee has lost the use of his legs; it also covers Brawl's opening attack, and ends just before Ironhide transforms in slow-motion.
- "Soldiers Arrive" – played during the scene where the soldier Captain William Lennox and his team land on the Soccent Airbase in Qatar.
