= Daniel Taylor =

Daniel, Dan, or Danny Taylor may refer to:

== Sportspeople ==
- Dan Taylor (shot putter) (born 1982), American shot putter
- Dan Taylor (cricketer) (1887–1957), South African cricketer
- Dan Taylor (footballer, born 1993), English footballer
- Dan Taylor (Australian footballer) (1922–2005), Australian rules footballer
- Dan Taylor (rodeo) (1923–2010), rodeo calf-roper
- Danny Taylor (footballer) (born 1991), English footballer
- Danny Taylor (ice hockey) (born 1986), British ice hockey goaltender
- Danny Taylor (baseball) (1900–1972), American baseball player
- Danny Taylor (rower), Irish Olympic rower and New Zealand university administrator

== Others ==
- Daniel C. Taylor (born 1945), American scholar and practitioner of social change
- Daniel Taylor (Baptist pastor) (1738–1816), founder of the New Connexion of General Baptists
- Daniel Taylor (countertenor) (born 1969), Canadian countertenor
- Daniel Taylor (environmentalist) (born 1938), American nature protection specialist (California, Hawaii)
- Daniel Taylor (painter) (born 1955), Canadian painter
- Daniel Taylor (politician) (1825–1889), Irish Liberal Member of Parliament for Coleraine 1874–1880
- Daniel Taylor (writer) (born 1948), Christian writer and academic
- Daniel G. Taylor (1819–1878), mayor of St. Louis, Missouri
- Danny Gordon Taylor, visual effects supervisor
- Daniel Lawrence Taylor, English comedy actor and writer
- Daniel Taylor (journalist), British football journalist

== Fictional characters ==
- Dan Taylor, character in the film American Empire
- Captain Dan Taylor, a character in the game The House of the Dead III
- Danny Taylor, a fictional character on the CBS television crime drama Without a Trace
- Lieutenant Dan Taylor, a fictional character from the book and film Forrest Gump
