= On My Soul (disambiguation) =

"On My Soul" is a 2026 song by Bruno Mars.

On My Soul may also refer to:

- "On My Soul", a 2014 song by G Herbo featuring Lil Reese from Welcome to Fazoland
- "On My Soul", a 2024 song by Lay Bankz from After 7
- "On My Soul", a 2021 song by Meek Mill from Expensive Pain
- "On My Soul", a 2019 song by Moneybagg Yo featuring Lil Durk from 43va Heartless
- "On My Soul", a 2023 song by Tobe Nwigwe and Nas featuring Jacob Banks from Transformers: Rise of the Beasts (soundtrack)
- "On My Soul", a 2015 song by Add-2 and produced by Khrysis
- "On My Soul", a 2023 song by J-Milla
- "On My Soul", a 2025 song by Smif-N-Wessun featuring Buckshot (rapper) and Young Strickland
