= BotCon =

Annual convention

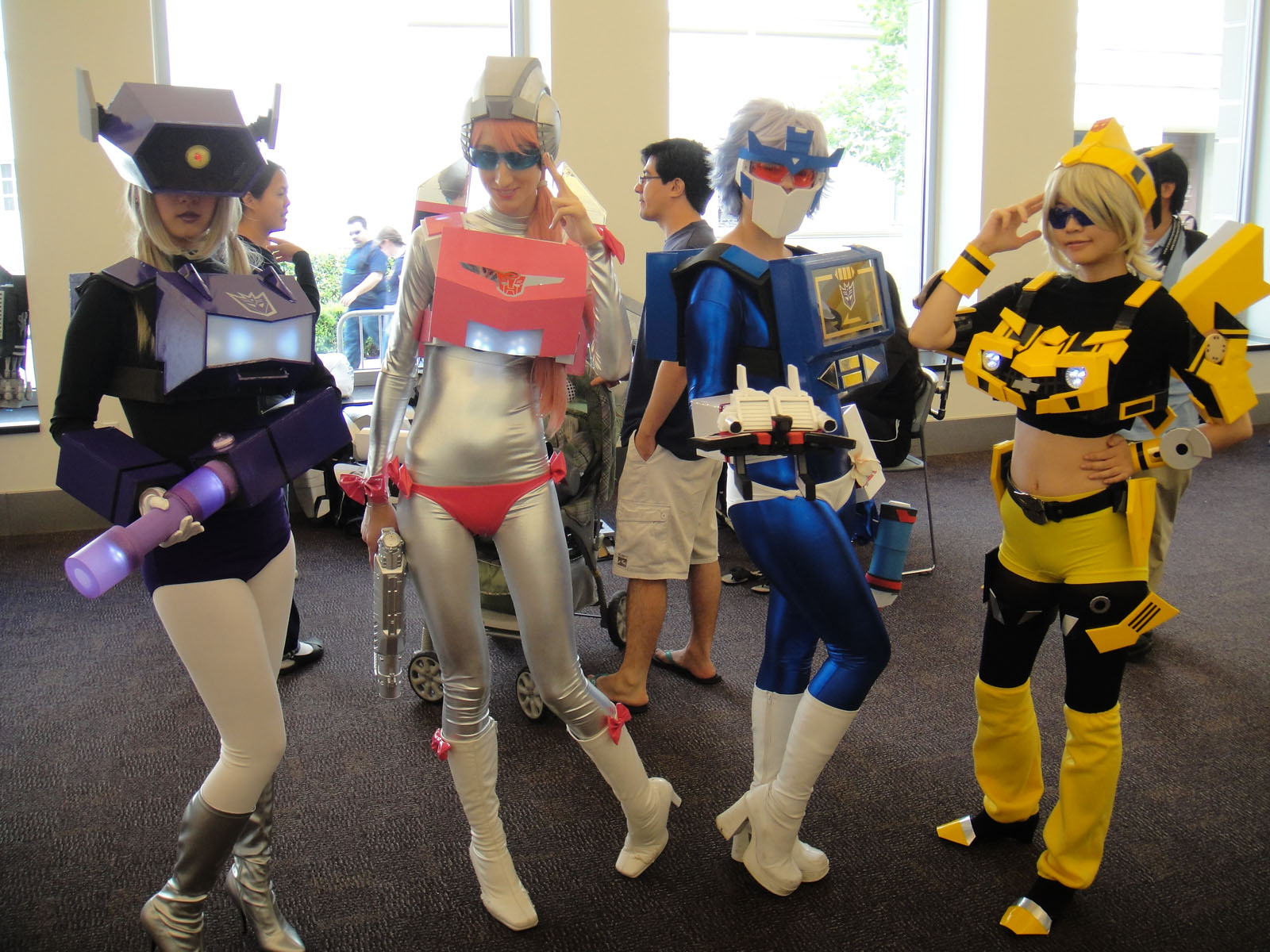
- Cosplayers at BotCon 2011
- Status: Active
- Genre: Transformers fan convention
- Inaugurated: 1994
- Most recent: 2026
- Organizer: Agabyss Enterprises LLC
- Filing status: Private company
- Website: https://www.botcon.com/

BotCon, previously known as the Official Transformers Collectors' Convention (OTFCC), is an annual convention for fans and collectors of the Transformers multimedia franchise and related merchandise.

The first BotCon was held in Fort Wayne, Indiana, United States in 1994. It had 120 attendees. In 2015, BotCon was recognized by Guinness World Records as the "longest-running Transformers convention".

Featured BotCon guests are usually involved in the creation of Transformers media in some respect, whether as voice actors from the animated series, artists or writers from the comic books, or Hasbro employees. Fun Publications held the convention for a number of years, with 2016 being its final year. BotCon remained defunct until returning in 2022.

BotCon has had numerous event-exclusive toys, including the first version of the character Apelinq. Apelinq debuted at BotCon 2000 and was designed by organizer Glen Hallit. The character would later appear in the 2023 film Transformers: Rise of the Beasts.

== Event history ==
=== BotCon ===
Year	Date(s)	Venue	City	Guests	Notes
1994	July 16	Grand Wayne Center	Fort Wayne, Indiana	Tom Bowman and Carl Fritz	
1995	August 5-6	Dayton Convention Center	Dayton, Ohio	N/A	
1996	July 12-14	Clarion Resort Rosemont	Rosemont, Illinois	George Boznos and Anthony Gaud	
1997	August 5-6	Dayton Convention Center	Dayton, Ohio	Dawn Berryman, George Boznos, Stan Bush, Peter Cullen, Vince DiCola, Bob Forward, Simon Furman, David Kaye, Jerry Palmer, Venus Terzo, and Andrew Wildman	
1998	June 19-20	Anaheim Convention Center	Anaheim, California	Susan Blu, Garry Chalk, Vince DiCola, Larry DiTillio, Jennifer Donahoe, Andy Espenshade, Bob Forward, Simon Furman, David Kaye, Bryce Malek Scott McNeil, Doug Parker, Rob Tokar, Andrew Wildman, and David Wise	
1999	July 16–18	St. Paul RiverCentre	St. Paul, Minnesota	Asaph Fipke, Jim Byrnes, Scott McNeil, and Brian Chapman	
2000	July 28-30	Grand Wayne Convention Center	Fort Wayne, Indiana	Ian James Corlett, John Moschitta, Venus Terzo, Alec Willows, Vince DiCola, Chris Tang, Joe Mattiko, and Jamie Overbey	
2001	July 13-15	Durham Marriott Civic Center	Durham, North Carolina	Michael Bell, Gregg Berger, Garry Chalk, Scott McNeil, John Stephenson, Paul Davids, Simon Furman, Ernie Burns, Vince DiCola, Gary Falcone, and Joe Mattiko	
2002	July 26-28	Grand Wayne Convention Center	Fort Wayne, Indiana	Dick Gautier, Neil Kaplan, Steve Kramer, Michael McConnohie, Peter Spellos, Wayne C. Lewis, Tom Wyner, Derek Choo-Wing, Richard Epcar, Adam Fortier, Simon Furman, Bob Forward, Pat Lee, Chris Sarracini, Michelle Field, Andrew Frankel, Joe Mattiko, and Aaron Archer	
2004	June 19-20	Pasadena Convention Center	Pasadena, California	Fumihiko Akiyama, Wally Burr, Peter Cullen, Paul Davids, Tom DeSanto, Flint Dille, Dan Gilvezan, Bryce Malek, Michael McConnohie, Tadao Tomomatsu, David Wise, Bob Prupis, and Alison Segebarth	
2005	September 21-25	Embassy Suites Dallas-Frisco Hotel & Conference Center	Frisco, Texas	Eric Siebenaler, Wally Burr, Michael Chain, Brian Dobson, Michael Dobson, Paul Dobson, Colton Dearing, Greg Lombardo, and Aaron Archer	
2006	September 28-October 1	Lexington Center	Lexington, Kentucky	Richard Newman, Blu Mankuma, Pauline Newstone, Scott McNeil, Peter Cullen, Chris Ryall, Dan Taylor, Simon Furman, Don Figueroa, Alex Milne, Dan Khanna, Jake Isenberg, Drew Eiden, and Marcelo Matere, Greg Lombardo, Forest Lee, Aaron Archer, and Eric Siebenaler	
2007	June 27-July 1	Rhode Island Convention Center	Providence, Rhode Island	Peter Cullen, Roberto Orci, Alex Kurtzman, Rachael Taylor, Tyrese Gibson, David Kaye, Daniel Ross, Stan Bush, Ernie Petrangelo, Brian Goldner, Vickie Stratford, Joe Kyde, Greg Lombardo, Aaron Archer, Eric Siebenaler, Jared Wade, and William Rawley	
2008	April 24-27	Duke Energy Center	Cincinnati, Ohio	Simon Furman, David Kaye, Alex Milne, Tara Strong, Derrick J. Wyatt, and Aaron Archer	
2009	May 28-31	Pasadena Convention Center	Pasadena, California	Gregg Berger, Stan Bush, Peter Cullen, Paul Davids, Vince DiCola, Flint Dille, David Kaye, Bryce Malek, Michael McConnohie, Alex Milne, David Wise, and Derrick J. Wyatt	
2010	June 24-27	Walt Disney World Dolphin Resort	Lake Buena Vista, Florida	Bob Budiansky, Jeff Kline, Kōjin Ōno, Peter Cullen, Hideaki Yoke, Paul Eiding, Scott McNeil, Drew Eiden, Karl Hartman, Lanny Lathem, Greg Sepelak, Pete Sinclair, Trent Troop, Jesse Wittenrich, Ben Yee, Rik Alvarez, Aaron Archer, Joe Kyde, Forest Lee, Greg Lombardo, Chris Oliveri, Lenny Panzica, Matthew Proulx, Bill Rawley, Eric Siebenaler, Tomoya Miyake, Brian Wilk, Jeff Kline, Mike Vogel, Casey Coller, Bill Forster, Dan Khanna, Marcelo Matere, Alex Milne, Chris Mowry, Jim Sorenson, Stan Bush, Matt Tieger, and Hironori Kobayashi	
2011	June 2-5	Pasadena Convention Center	Pasadena, California	Jack Angel, Arlene Banas, Gregg Berger, Stan Bush, Flint Dille, David Kaye, Jeff Kline, Morgan Lofting, Michael McConnohie, and Neil Ross	
2012	April 26-29	Hyatt Regency Dallas	Dallas, Texas	N/A	
2013	June 27-30	Town and Country Resort	San Diego, California	Wally Burr, Jason Jansen, and David Sobolov	
2014	June 19–22	Pasadena Convention Center	Pasadena, California	Jack Angel, Susan Blu, Steve Blum, David Kaye, Morgan Lofting, Michael McConnohie, and Derrick J. Wyatt	
2015	June 18-21	Pheasant Run Resort	St. Charles, Illinois	Susan Blu, John Moschitta Jr., Frank Welker, and Derrick J. Wyatt	
2016	April 7-10	Galt House Hotel	Louisville, Kentucky	Gregg Berger, David Kaye, Judd Nelson, Venus Terzo, Winston Bolen, Josh Burcham, Brendan Cahill, Ken Christiansen, Casey Coller, Archie Cunningham, Thomas Deer, Brandy Dixon, Matt Frank, Andrew Hall, Adam Hicks, Dan Khanna, Marcelo Matere, Alex Milne, Robby Musso, Josh Perez, Sara Pitre-Durocher, Rob Roberts, Hayato Sakamoto, Brian Shearer, Derrick J. Wyatt, Silas Zee, Stan Bush, Vince DiCola, Kenny Meriedeth, Ken Rose, Pete Sinclair, Aaron Archer, and John-Paul Bove	This would be the last year BotCon was held until 2022
2022	August 25-28	Embassy Suites Nashville Downtown	Nashville, Tennessee	Gregg Berger, Bob Budiansky, Jeanne Carr, Simon Furman, Laurie Hymes, David Kaye, Michael McConnohie, Melodee M. Spevack, Frank Welker	
2023	August 24-27	American Dream Mall	East Rutherford, New Jersey	Travis Artz, Susan Blu, Bob Budiansky, Garry Chalk, Jessica DiGiovanni, Simon Furman, Scott McNeil, Robby Musso, and Venus Terzo	
2024	June 27-30	Grand Wayne Convention Center	Fort Wayne, Indiana	Aaron Archer, Gregg Berger, Paul Eiding, Robby Musso, and Alec Willows	

=== BotCon Japan ===
Year	Date(s)	Venue	City	Guests	Notes
1997	June 8	Science and Technology Hall	Tokyo, Japan	N/A	
1998	December 12-13	Sevencity Hall	Tokyo, Japan	Hirotaka Suzuoki	
2000	December 17	Tokyo Trade Center Taito Hall	Tokyo, Japan	Tesshō Genda	

=== BotCon Europe ===
Year	Date(s)	Venue	City	Guests	Notes
1999	August 13-14	St. Barnabas Center	London, England	Simon Furman	
2002	November 3	Wolsey Hall	Cheshunt, England	Simon Furman, Neil Kaplan, and Wayne C. Lewis	

=== Official Transformers Collectors Convention ===
BotCon was renamed the Official Transformers Collectors Convention in 2003 after organizers Jon Hartman and Karl Hartman had departed 3H Productions.

Year	Date(s)	Venue	City	Guests	Notes
2003	July 25-July 27	Hyatt Regency O'Hare	Rosemont, Illinois	Vince DiCola, Gregg Berger, Garry Chalk, David Kaye, Josh Blaylock, Mike Norton, Clayton Brown, Mark Brooks, Simon Furman, Jerry Jivoin, Eric Siebenaler, and Aaron Archer	
2004	July 31-August 1	Donald E. Stephens Convention Center	Rosemont, Illinois	Michael McConnohie, Dan Gilvezan, Scott McNeil, Bob Budiansky, Simon Furman, Andrew Wildman, Vince DiCola, Greg Lombardo, Aaron Archer, Eric Siebenaler, and Tony Beard	This would be the last convention organized by 3H Productions before filing for Chapter 7 Bankruptcy.

== See also ==
- TFcon
