= Transformers: Dark of the Moon – The Score =

Soundtrack album by Steve Jablonsky
- Released: June 24, 2011
- Recorded: 2011
- Genres: Soundtrack, film score, experimental
- Length: 59:47
- Label: Reprise
- Producers: Steve Jablonsky; Alex Gibson

Transformers: Dark of the Moon – The Score is a soundtrack that features the musical score composed and arranged by Steve Jablonsky for the 2011 film Transformers: Dark of the Moon. It was released on June 24, 2011, five days before the actual release of the film. The song "Heed Our Warning" features in the Transformers: Revenge of the Fallen score but was featured in the film when Sentinel Prime, the Decepticons and spaceships attacked Chicago.

The score was once available on iTunes, but was later removed, along with its sequel, Transformers: Age of Extinction - The Score, once it reached a limit of having sold 15000 units before re-use fees would have to be paid. Jablonsky hopes to eventually re-release the score along with the score for Age of Extinction (which shared a similar fate regarding reaching aforementioned limit) at some point in the future.

== Track listing ==
No.	Title	Length
1.	"Dark Side of the Moon"	3:49
2.	"Sentinel Prime"	3:16
3.	"Lost Signal"	4:08
4.	"In Time You'll See"	3:16
5.	"Impress Me"	3:00
6.	"We Were Gods Once"	4:22
7.	"Battle"	3:40
8.	"There Is No Plan"	3:36
9.	"We All Work for the Decepticons"	1:51
10.	"The Fight Will Be Your Own"	4:41
11.	"Shockwave's Revenge"	2:00
12.	"No Prisoners, Only Trophies"	3:32
13.	"The World Needs You Now"	1:59
14.	"It's Our Fight"	6:32
15.	"I'm Just the Messenger"	4:25
16.	"I Promise"	1:58
17.	"Our Final Hope"	3:42
Total length:		59:47
