= Transformers: Rise of the Beasts (soundtrack) =

Transformers: Rise of the Beasts (Music from the Motion Picture)

Film score by Jongnic Bontemps
- Released: June 9, 2023
- Recorded: 2021–2023
- Studios: Newman Scoring Stage, 20th Century Studios, Los Angeles; Eastwood Scoring Stage, Warner Bros., Burbank; Larrabee Sound Studios, North Hollywood; Chappy Studios, Burbank
- Genres: Film score; electronic
- Length: 65:44
- Labels: Milan; Paramount Music
- Producers: Jongnic Bontemps; Steve Jablonsky; Michael Bay; Lorenzo di Bonaventura (exec.)

Jongnic Bontemps chronology
Redfall (2023)	Transformers: Rise of the Beasts (2023)	Jagged Mind (2023)

Transformers: Rise of the Beasts (Music from the Motion Picture) is the soundtrack to the 2023 film of the same name. The score was written by Jongnic Bontemps, the third composer to work on the Transformers film series after Steve Jablonsky and Dario Marianelli. Recording of the film score began in November 2021 and ended in May 2023. It was released by Milan Records and Paramount Music alongside the film on June 9, 2023.

The score references Jablonsky's themes from Transformers (2007) and Vince DiCola's theme from The Transformers: The Movie (1986). Bontemps felt that the main goal was to influence Jablonsky's score for the first five films directed by Michael Bay, but he also needed to provide fresh music for Rise of the Beasts, as the film is set in 1990s Brooklyn and Peru. Accordingly, Bontemps handled the elements for the Brooklyn-based scenes and employed several prominent soloists from Latin America and Africa for the Peruvian portions. The music received generally positive reviews from critics.

== Background ==
Bontemps first worked with the film's director, Steven Caple Jr., while both were students at the University of Southern California in 2011. Their continued relationship saw him also score Caple's debut film The Land (2016), and work on Creed II (2018), where he provided additional music alongside lead composer Ludwig Göransson. In April 2021, Bontemps wrote 10 minutes of music for the Transformers franchise and recorded it with a 40-piece orchestra at his own expense ($20,000), but received no response. According to the Vice President of Paramount Music, Randy Spendlove, the production team considered several composers as it was a big franchise with long history, but felt "Bontemps' relationships and diverse background played a role, but ultimately it was about finding a composer that understood the material". Bontemps had been associated with the Transformers franchise from a young age and developed "a deep love and respect for the music of the movies and the music that Steve Jablonsky wrote."

Since the film's original June 2022 release was delayed by a year to allow extended time for post-production, Bontemps received an offer to provide the music, with the caveat that recording would be done on the Paramount lot—a state-of-the-art recording studio was built for this purpose. He began recording in February 2022, in the same building as the director, editors, and post-production supervisor, instead of working remotely and delivering the music via virtual communication as was standard practice at the time given COVID-19 pandemic restrictions. Jablonsky was brought on near the end to consult and produce as the team, per production executives, wanted the score to be influenced by his work for Bay's first five Transformers films.

== Recording and production ==
According to Bontemps, the musicians experimented with different musical styles, initially taking a more electronics-heavy, "sound-design path" which did not serve the film. He admitted that "Even though we have this amazing CGI and the robots feel so real, that human element, the emotional element, can really be supported by the music", hence the need for an "organic, orchestral and emotional score, that sound we are all familiar with, and has such a deep history, goes a long way for we as the audience to connect with these robots". Strings, brass, and percussion combined with electronics formed the base of the score, which Bontemps refers to as "the grooves of Brooklyn".

"For me, bringing in the sound of Brooklyn meant not only the syncopated rhythms and the bounce of that music, but also bringing in the iconic Roland TR-808 drum machine, which is really the bedrock of so many hip-hop tracks from that area. You'll definitely hear it that 808 throughout the Brooklyn parts of the score. This is not a hip-hop score, this is a Transformers cinematic score, but I wanted to have a little bit of seasoning, and I decided to use that drum machine as the seasoning for that part of the score."

— Jongnic Bontemps

The film's setting takes place in Brooklyn and Peru in 1994. Having been born in Brooklyn, Bontemps felt that the particular beat of his home state was "the sound of hip-hop, the 808 drum machine...those syncopated rhythms and grooves". For Peru, he looked into Afro-Peruvian traditions and recruited prominent soloists, including Peruvian percussionist Alex Acuña, Mexican bassist Abraham Laboriel (who played the guitarron and charango), Venezuelan musician Pedro Eustache (who played Latin woodwinds), and composer Erick Del Agula as a music consultant. Having worked with composers such as Danny Elfman, Alan Silvestri, and Alexandre Desplat, who asked him to build technology in their studios so that they could write sufficient music before recording the orchestra, Bontemps felt that he could simulate the orchestra and synths and build the piece of music close to the final product he anticipated. After writing the music and playing it for the studio music department and producers, who provided insight on the score prior to its approval, Bontemps started creating the sheet music for all the musicians to play, and created the Pro Tools recording sessions, which were used as part of the recording.

Sessions took place over the course of ten days at the Newman Scoring Stage on the 20th Century Studios lot in Burbank, California and the Eastwood Scoring Stage at Warner Bros. A 74-piece orchestra, comprising six percussionists, a 25-piece brass section, twelve horns, six trombones, three brass trombones, three cimbasso and tubas, a rare brass tubax, a modified contrabass saxophone, and a drum set built almost entirely out of rubber tires (used to create a unique sound), performed the score. Bontemps first recorded the string elements then layered them with the pre-recorded synths and drum machines. Later, John Chapman was brought in to mix the score. When recording was nearing completion, the producers hired Jablonsky to serve as the score consultant and producer; he also scored three of the cues in the score. Bontemps has stated that Jablonsky "was really wonderful in helping me craft some of this music and really think about how it should play in the entire soundscape of the film".

== Track listing ==
All tracks are written by Jongnic Bontemps, except where noted.

No.	Title	Writer(s)	Length
1.	"The Maximals"		2:36
2.	"Unicron / Scourge"		3:36
3.	"Autobots Enter"		0:56
4.	"What Are You"		1:28
5.	"More Than Meets the Eye"		1:31
6.	"Mirage"		1:58
7.	"Museum Heist"		1:14
8.	"Battle at Ellis Island"		2:28
9.	"Fallen Hero"		1:48
10.	"Chris Meets Mirage"		1:55
11.	"Arriving in Peru"		2:22
12.	"Hiding in Plain Sight"		1:29
13.	"The Cave"		2:30
14.	"Switchback Chase"	Steve Jablonsky	4:21
15.	"The Village"		3:48
16.	"Saving Elena"		2:56
17.	"One Last Stand"		3:07
18.	"The Final Battle Begins"		3:19
19.	"Unicron Approaches"		1:30
20.	"Home Team"		2:22
21.	"Volcano Battle"		2:58
22.	"No Matter the Cost"		1:55
23.	"Till All Are One"	Steve Jablonsky	1:54
24.	"Humans and Autobots United"	Steve Jablonsky	2:31
25.	"Here's My Card"		2:46
26.	"A Long Time Ago"		6:26
Total length:			65:44

=== Reception ===
Frank Scheck of The Hollywood Reporter commented that the film's story and setting provided "plenty of opportunity for the soundtrack inclusion of classic '90s-era hip-hop cuts to complement the thundering score by Jongnic "JB" Bontemps". Calling the music one of the important aspects, Melissa Thompson of We Are Movie Geeks wrote that "The score from film composer Jongnic "JB" Bontemps is fantastic, but what really connects is the early 90's hip hop tracks that are used to pump up the action sequences. They fit nicely into the time frame and has the audience moving in their seats. This fun film will delight fans of the classic '90s animated television series Beast Wars: Transformers." Conversely, Jeremy Mathai of /Film felt that Bontemps' score "largely recedes into the background".

== Curated soundtrack ==
Rise of the Beasts, also featured hip hop and electronic music from popular artists. Caple Jr. announced the inclusion of rap groups Wu-Tang Clan and A Tribe Called Quest, being brought in to be authentic to the film's setting. In an interview to The Hollywood Reporter, he mentioned an unreleased song that comes along with the film, and a legacy artist from the 1990s would contribute to the track. The aforementioned track was titled as "On My Soul"; composed and performed by Tobe Nwigwe and Nas and featuring Jacob Banks, the track was released by Mass Appeal Records on May 19, 2023. Similar to Age of Extinction (2014) and The Last Knight (2017), no official soundtrack album for the songs featured in the film has been released. A separate playlist was released by Paramount Pictures to music streaming platforms.

No.	Title	Writer(s)	Original album	Length
1.	"C.R.E.A.M. (Cash Rules Everything Around Me)" (Wu-Tang Clan feat. Buddha Monk, Inspectah Deck, Method Man and Raekwon)	David Porter, RZA and Wu-Tang Clan	Enter the Wu-Tang (36 Chambers) (expanded edition)	4:12
2.	"Check the Rhime" (A Tribe Called Quest)	Ali Shaheed Muhammad, Q-Tip and Malik Taylor	The Low End Theory	3:36
3.	"Anything" (SWV, Allen Gordon Jr. and Arty Skye)	Brian Alexander Morgan	It's About Time	4:07
4.	"Represent" (Nas)	Christopher Martin and Nas	Illmatic	4:12
5.	"Rebirth of Slick (Cool Like Dat)" (Digable Planets)	Digable Planets	Reachin' (A New Refutation of Time and Space)	4:21
6.	"The Choice Is Yours" (Black Sheep)	Dres and William McLean	A Wolf in Sheep's Clothing	3:23
7.	"Mama Said Knock You Out (Sam Wilkes Remix)" (LL Cool J and Sam Wilkes)	Bob Erwin, James Mccants, Leroy Mccants and Marlon Williams	Mama Said Knock You Out	4:25
8.	"Hypnotize" (The Notorious B.I.G.)	Andy Armer, Deric Angelettie, Sean Combs, Randy Alpert, Slick Rick and Ronald Lawrence	Greatest Hits	3:50
9.	"On My Soul" (Tobe Nwigwe and Nas featuring Jacob Banks)	Tobe Nwigwe, Nas and Jacob Banks	—	2:40

== Album credits ==
Credits adapted from Paramount Music.

Recorded at Newman Scoring Stage, 20th Century Studios; Eastwood Scoring Stage, Warner Bros.; and Larrabee Studios. Mixed at Chappy Studios, Burbank, California.

- Music composer: Jongnic Bontemps
- Music producer: Steve Jablonsky, Bontemps
- Executive soundtrack album producer: Michael Bay, Lorenzo di Bonaventura
- Additional music: DeAndre James Allen-Toole, Nathan Matthew David, Anthony Baldino
- Newman Scoring Stage recordist: Tim Lauber
- Newman Scoring Stage managers: Damon Tedesco, Hoss Yekband, Greg Dennen, Jesse Johnstone
- Newman Scoring Stage engineers: Jim Wright, Marc Gebauer
- Newman executive sound staff: Stacey Robinson, VP Post Sound Operations
- WB Scoring Stage crew: Tom Hardisty, Richard Wheeler Jr., Peter Nelson, David Clark, Jamie Olvera
- Recording and mixing engineer: John Witt Chapman
- Music assistance: DeAndre James Allen-Toole
- Score coordinators: Elisa Alloway, Sophia Blake
- Score manager: Sam Zeines
- Music consultants: Seth Waldmann, Ira Becker, Ananda Dhar-James, Erick Del Aguila (Peruvian music)
- Music contractors: Peter Rotter and Laura Jackman for Encompass Music Partners
- Pro Tools engineer: David Lukacs
- Pro Tools operator: Larry Mah
- Synth design and programming: Anthony Baldino, Nathan Matthew David, Chris Lane
- Choir contractor: Miklos Lukacs
- Score publisher: Paramount Bella Music (BMI)
- Executive in charge of music for Paramount Pictures: Randy Spendlove
- Soundtrack co-ordinator for Paramount Pictures: Michael Murphy

Orchestra

- Orchestra conductor: Anthony Parnther
- Lead orchestrator: Susie Benchasil Seiter
- Orchestrators: Chad Seiter, Jeff Tinsley, M.R. Miller, Tim Davies
- Assistant orchestrator: Grigor Abgaryan, Ryan Humphrey, Lorenzo Carrano
- Supervising copyist: Booker White
- Music preparation: Chris Anderson-Bazzoli, Brandon Bailo, Marshall Bowen, Joshua Britt, Leslie Buttars, Nicholas Cazares, Matt Franko, David Giuli, Jennifer Hammond, Lisa Janacua, Samantha Keefer, Valarie King, Martin McClellan, Aaron Meyer, Melissa Orquiza, James Sale, Karen Smith

Choir

- Budapest Art Choir recorded at East Connection Music Recording, Studio 22
- Choir conductor: Peter Pejtsik
- Choir recording: Gabor Buczko

Musicians

- Violins: Alyssa Park, Luanne Homzy, Stephanie Matthews, Kyle Gilner, Wynton Grant, Chris Woods, Nadira Kimberly, Charlie Bisharat, Tereza Stanislav, Ben Jacobson, Josefina Vergara, Maya Magub, Grace Oh, Max Karmazyn, Dennis Kim, Jordan Martone, Phillip Levy, Molly Rogers, Roberto Cani, Ana Landauer, Helen Nightengale, Eun Mee Ahn, Tamara Hatwan, Jessica Guideri, Shalini Vijayan, Natalie Leggett, Songa Lee, Neil Samples, Joel Pargman, Irina Voloshina
- Violas: Andrew Duckles, Stefan Smith, Drew Forde, Nikki Shorts, Zach Dellinger, Meredith Crawford, Matt Funes, Jerome Gordon, Luke Maurer, Lynne Richberg, Alma Fernandez
- Celli: Evgeny Tonkha, Jacob Braun, Tim Loo, Seth Parker Woods, Caleb Jones, Adrienne Woods, Marza Wilks, Vanessa Freebairn-smith, Ross Gasworth, Ben Lash, Jean Paul Barjon, Hillary Smith
- Basses: Mike Valerio, Timothy Eckert, William “BJ” Johnson, Karl Vincent, Thomas Harte, Geoff Osika, Steve Dress, Stephanie Payne
- French Horns, Dylan Hart, Malik Taylor, Ben Jaber, Laura Brenes, Kaylet Torres, Teag Reaves, Amy Jo Rhine, Katie Faraudo, Mike McCoy, Steve Becknell, Allen Fogle, Adam Wolf, Emily Pesavento, Amy Sanchez, Paul Klintworth, Adedeji Ogunfolu, Dave Everson, Jacklyn Rainey, Jennifer Kummer, Stephanie Thomas
- Trombones: Alan Kaplan, Alex Iles, Steve Holtman, Lemar Guillery, David Rejano, Todd Eames, Ido Meshulam, Ryan Dragon, John Lofton, Byron Sleugh, Craig Gosnell, Nick Daley, Steve Trapani
- Cimbasso: Doug Tornquist, Devon Taylor
- Tuba: Joseph Jackson, Blake Cooper
- Tubax: Pat Posey
- Latin percussion: Alex Acuña, Luis Conte, Walter Rodriguez, Richard “Tiki” Pasillas
- Peruvian woodwinds: Pedro Eustache
- Percussion: MB Gordy, Hal Rosenfeld, Wesley Sumpter, Sidney Hopson, Raynor Carroll, Wade Culbreath
- Guitarron: Abe Laboriel Sr.
