= Battle Cry (Imagine Dragons song) =

Single by Imagine Dragons

from the album Transformers: Age of Extinction (soundtrack) and Smoke + Mirrors (Super deluxe)
- B-side: "All for You"
- Released: June 2, 2014
- Recorded: 2014 at Imagine Dragons Studio (Las Vegas, Nevada)
- Genre: Electronic rock; arena rock; progressive rock
- Length: 4:34
- Label: KIDinaKORNER; Interscope
- Songwriters: Ben McKee; Daniel Platzman; Dan Reynolds; Wayne Sermon
- Producers: Imagine Dragons; Alex Da Kid; Hans Zimmer; Steve Jablonsky

Imagine Dragons singles chronology
"Radioactive" (remix ft. Kendrick Lamar) (2014)	"Battle Cry" (2014)	"Warriors" (2014)

Audio
- "Battle Cry" on YouTube

"Battle Cry" is a song by American rock band Imagine Dragons. It was released on June 2, 2014, as a single promoting Transformers: Age of Extinction, a 2014 science fiction action film based on the Transformers franchise. The song, which appears during key action scenes in the film and in the end credits, was also included on the super deluxe version of the band’s second studio album, Smoke + Mirrors (2015). It is the first theme song in the live-action Transformers film franchise not to be performed by Linkin Park, though the latter's "Until It's Gone" is included on the accompanying video game.

== Background ==
As part of his efforts to distance Age of Extinction from the previous films in the series, Transformers director Michael Bay sought out a new musical act to soundtrack the film and hand picked Imagine Dragons for the job. "Battle Cry" was written by the group members specifically for use in the film, inspired by the story as pitched to them by Bay. Lead singer Dan Reynolds revealed to Billboard that the aim with "Battle Cry" was to write "in a more cinematic way" to compose a song that was satisfying as a piece of music but also benefited the visual it was set to accompany.

== Track listing ==
Digital download
No.	Title	Length
1.	"Battle Cry"	4:32

== Personnel ==
Imagine Dragons

- Dan Reynolds – vocals, piano
- Wayne Sermon – acoustic and electric guitars
- Ben McKee – bass guitar, keyboards
- Daniel Platzman – drums, percussion

Additional Musicians

- Hans Zimmer – production
- Steve Jablonsky – production

== Charts ==
Chart (2014)	Peak position
Australia (ARIA)	44
France (SNEP)	150
UK Singles (Official Charts Company)	111
US Hot Rock & Alternative Songs (Billboard)	24

== Certifications ==
Region	Certification	Certified units/sales
United States (RIAA)	Gold	500,000^{‡}
^{‡} Sales+streaming figures based on certification alone.
