= Falling Off a Clef =

Studio album by Vince Dicola
- Released: 2004
- Genre: Electronic

Falling Off a Clef (2004) is the first full-length album by Vince Dicola, composer to the music score of The Transformers: The Movie. The album is a selection of pieces from a project Vince and Kenny Meriedeth were approached to work on called Sci-Fighter. A full statement from Vince is posted on the Travis Dickenson website.

== Track listing ==
(Tracks 3–23 from Sci-Fighter.)

1. Castle of the Gods Suite
2. Alien Match
3. The Exhibition
4. I'm Going in
5. Daddy's Home
6. We Need to Talk
7. Into the Game
8. Choose Your Level (excerpt)
9. Something's Wrong
10. Look Out!
11. Defeat the Karate Master
12. The Monkey Man
13. King Fu Catfight
14. Help Your Brother
15. The Path to the Portal
16. Dance of the Scorpion Queen
17. Dream of the Dragon
18. Rumble Inna Gadda
19. You're Not My Father
20. Imaginary Ninjas
21. Sci-Fighter Suite
22. The Master Returns
23. Fallen Angel
24. FS #7 / Variation on a Theme
25. A.P.B.
26. Castle of the Gods (theme variation)
