= Artistically Beatles =

Studio album by Vince DiCola
- Released: 1993
- Genre: New age, easy listening
- Label: K-tel
- Producer: Vince DiCola

Vince DiCola chronology
Artistically Beatles (1993)	In-Vince-Ible! (2001)

Professional ratings
Review scores
Source	Rating
AllMusic	2.5/5 stars

Artistically Beatles is a studio album by keyboardist Vince DiCola. DiCola covers ten Beatles songs that he arranged in a New-age instrumental genre. It was released in 1993 and features Roger Voudouris on lead vocals on the first track. On the bottom, front cover of the artwork it reads, "New Contemporary Instrumental Arrangements."

== Track listing ==
All Songs are performed, arranged and produced by Vincent DiCola

No.	Title	Writer(s)	Length
1.	"Something" (featuring Roger Voudouris on vocals)	George Harrison	5:31
2.	"Eleanor Rigby"	Lennon, McCartney	4:51
3.	"You Never Give Me Your Money" (feat. Vince Dicola on vocals)	Lennon, McCartney	4:55
4.	"Here Comes the Sun"	George Harrison	3:56
5.	"Norwegian Wood (This Bird Has Flown)"	Lennon, McCartney	4:04
6.	"Penny Lane"	Lennon, McCartney	4:35
7.	"Maxwell's Silver Hammer"	Lennon, McCartney	4:03
8.	"Michelle"	Lennon, McCartney	4:34
9.	"Because"	Lennon, McCartney	3:39
10.	"Here, There and Everywhere"	Lennon, McCartney	5:57
Total length:			46:05

== Personnel ==
- Vince DiCola - keyboards, synthesizer, engineer
- Owen Husney - Executive Producer
- Jim Dryden - Cover Illustration
- Roger Voudouris - Vocals on 1st track
