= Transformers: The Last Knight (soundtrack) =

Film score by Steve Jablonsky
- Released: June 23, 2017
- Genre: Film score
- Length: 2:09:34
- Labels: La-La Land Records; Paramount Music
- Producer: Steve Jablonsky

Transformers: The Last Knight (Music from the Motion Picture) is a soundtrack album for the 2017 film of the same name. The score was written by Steve Jablonsky who composed the scores for the previous four films in the series.

== Track listing ==
Various tracks in the score reprise themes that Jablonsky wrote for the previous films. The score also features several suites, including "Purity of Heart" and "Stay and Fight". Jablonsky reused the track "Have Faith Prime”, a piece he composed for Age of Extinction; this track isn't included in the score.

In an interview, Jablonsky spoke of the unusual length of the soundtrack, citing that much of his work in the film was cut up in the editing process. As a result, he chose to release a longer score that featured much of his original, unedited music for the film. Some tracks, such as "Sacrifice" and "We Have to Go", were heavily edited for the film, while the score's version of said tracks is unedited suites. For instance, the "Sacrifice" suite runs at seven minutes but was cut down to three minutes in the film. In addition, the "Merlin's Staff" suite, which is six minutes long, was cut down to a thirty-second piece in the film. The "Quintessa" suite was cut apart into at least nine small tracks in the film.

The film's complete score (containing 83 tracks, including unreleased tracks as well as film versions of tracks found on the standard album) was released by Paramount Pictures in January 2018, as part of their "For Your Consideration" campaign. The tracks in the complete score are accurate to how they are heard in the film, with various tracks (such as “Drone Chase”) being cut into multiple parts in order to better match their use in the film. Some of the tracks also intersect with one another.

No.	Title	Length
1.	"Sacrifice"	6:47
2.	"The Coming of Cybertron"	4:59
3.	"Merlin's Staff"	5:49
4.	"No-Go Zone"	3:29
5.	"Stay and Fight"	6:26
6.	"Code Red"	2:13
7.	"Izzy"	4:00
8.	"Purity of Heart"	3:34
9.	"Megatron Negotiation"	3:38
10.	"Today We Hunt"	1:47
11.	"Running Out Of Tomorrows"	1:21
12.	"Drone Chase"	5:08
13.	"You Have Been Chosen"	2:18
14.	"Seglass Ni Tonday"	6:27
15.	"Quintessa"	6:36
16.	"Vivian"	3:52
17.	"Abduction"	3:04
18.	"History of Transformers"	4:23
19.	"Cogman Sings"	2:09
20.	"Vivian Follows Merlin"	6:41
21.	"The Greatest Mission of All"	2:19
22.	"Dive"	3:15
23.	"Two Moons"	2:03
24.	"Merlin's Tomb"	3:18
25.	"Claim the Staff"	3:36
26.	"Prime Versus Bee"	2:45
27.	"Your Voice"	4:34
28.	"I Had My Moment"	2:29
29.	"Ospreys"	1:49
30.	"Battlefield"	3:43
31.	"Did You Forget Who I Am"	1:56
32.	"We Have To Go"	5:48
33.	"Calling All Autobots"	2:55
34.	"Sir Edmund Burton"	4:10

== Complete Score Tracklist ==
The film's complete score was released in January 2018, as part of the film's For Your Consideration award campaign.

- Features music from previous films

Track Number	Track Title	Length	Film Version of:
1	Opening Battle	1:46	The Coming of Cybertron
2	Merlin	0:32	Merlin's Staff
3	Merlin Gets the Staff/Battle Won	3:12	Sacrifice
4	Troubled Times	1:57	The Coming of Cybertron
5	No-Go Zone/Kids	3:01	No-Go Zone
6	Sqweeks/Canopy Part 1*	1:05	Unreleased track
7	Sqweeks/Canopy Part 2	1:24	Unreleased track
8	Canopy Death	0:41	Unreleased track
9	Cade Arrival*	1:19	Unreleased track
10	Knight Gives Cade Medal Disk/Cade Captured	2:29	Stay and Fight
11	Stand Down	1:48	Unreleased track
12	That Voice	0:53	Unreleased track
13	Barricade/Megatron	0:44	Unreleased track
14	Quintessa Part 1	1:13	Quintessa
15	Quintessa Part 2	1:32	Quintessa
16	Cade Driving Amulet	1:03	Purity of Heart
17	Polo	0:47	Unreleased track
18	Vivian Arrives at Museum	0:28	Unreleased track
19	Vivian Museum	1:16	Vivian
20	Quintessa Part 3/Optimus Redemption	1:01	Quintessa
21	Cade's Junkyard	0:47	Unreleased track
22	Talisman (The Medal)	1:01	Unreleased track
23	No Home*	1:03	"Have Faith Prime" (*from the Age of Extinction score)
24	Too Tough to Share	1:34	Izzy
25	Horns from Hell Part 1	1:10	Quintessa
26	Horns from Hell Part 2	0:31	Quintessa
27	Dad	1:28	Unreleased track
28	Megatron Montage Front	1:39	Megatron Negotiation
29	The Tank/Megatron Names His Crew/TRF Plans	2:22	Megatron Negotiation
30	We Hunt (Decepticons Hunt)	1:45	Today We Hunt
31	Izzy and Cade Fix Voicebox	1:23	Running Out of Tomorrows
32	Lennox Mounts Up/Code Red*	2:15	Code Red
33	Standoff/TRF/Cade	1:48	Unreleased track
34	Megatron Has Sqweeks/Put Him Down	1:27	Unreleased track
35	Drone Chase Part 1	2:34	Drone Chase
36	Drone Chase Part 2	2:27	Drone Chase
37	Cade Meets Cogman*	1:22	You Have Been Chosen
38	Chosen	1:12	You Have Been Chosen
39	One True Knight/Quintessa Part 1	0:23	Quintessa
40	Freak Anomaly	0:44	Unreleased track
41	One True Knight/Quintessa Part 2	1:02	Quintessa
42	Father's Study	1:11	Abduction
43	Father's Study/Car Abduction	2:00	Abduction
44	Cade and B Arrive at Burton's	0:55	Seglass Ni Tonday
45	Keep a Secret/Viv Arrives	1:29	Seglass Ni Tonday
46	American Man/Viv and Cade Talk to Burton	1:15	Unreleased track
47	Witwiccans	1:59	History of Transformers
48	Nazis/Battle Memories	0:59	History of Transformers
49	Every Myth	0:55	Unreleased track
50	Round Table/Organ SRC	1:28	Cogman Sings
51	Cogman Choir	0:38	Cogman Sings
52	The Staff	2:27	Seglass Ni Tonday
53	Better Get Cracking	4:47	Vivian Follows Merlin
54	Planetary Vampirism	1:24	Unreleased track
55	Vivian Follows Merlin/Car Chase	3:00	Vivian Follows Merlin
56	HMS Alliance	0:57	Unreleased track
57	Too Old	1:57	The Greatest Mission of All
58	Underwater	2:56	Dive
59	Burton Visits the Prime Minister	1:12	Unreleased track
60	Submarine	2:04	Stay and Fight
61	Two Moons	1:54	Two Moons
62	Slimy Staff Search	0:44	Unreleased track
63	Merlin's Tomb Part 1	0:47	Merlin's Tomb
64	Space Station	0:39	Unreleased track
65	Merlin's Tomb Part 2	2:32	Merlin's Tomb
66	Claim the Staff	3:50	Claim the Staff
67	Ship Rise	1:16	Prime Vs. Bee
68	Top Side Fight (Prime Vs. Bee)	1:42	Prime Vs. Bee
69	Your Voice*	2:14	Your Voice
70	Knighted Part 1*	2:14	Your Voice
71	Knighted Part 2	0:28	Your Voice
72	Shut It Down	2:47	Unreleased track
73	Soldiers Take Position/Burton Dies*	2:38	I Had My Moment
74	Back In the Tank/Quintessa Shoots Blue Light	1:01	Quintessa
75	Crush Zone/Prison Ship Hangar	1:30	Unreleased track
76	Fly With Me	0:47	Unreleased track
77	Ospreys	1:42	Ospreys
78	Gunfire	3:39	Battlefield
79	Dante/Prime Kills Dante*	1:53	Did You Forget Who I Am
80	We Have to Go/Zero Gravity	5:22	We Have to Go
81	Fall and Grab	1:31	Calling All Autobots
82	Ending*	2:11	Calling All Autobots
83	Unicron	0:58	Quintessa

== Charts ==
Chart (2017)	Peak position
Belgian Albums (Ultratop Wallonia)	148
