= Dan Taylor (Australian footballer) =

Australian rules footballer

Personal information
- Full name: Dan Taylor
- Born: 8 March 1922
- Died: 13 May 2005 (aged 83)
- Original team: Sixth Melbourne Scouts
- Height: 183 cm (6 ft 0 in)
- Weight: 80 kg (176 lb)

Playing career^{1}
Years	Club	Games (Goals)
1945	Footscray	3 (3)
- ^{1} Playing statistics correct to the end of 1945.

Dan Taylor (8 March 1922 – 13 May 2005) was a former Australian rules footballer who played with Footscray in the Victorian Football League (VFL).
