= Vince DiCola =

American musician and composer

- Born: Vincent Louis DiCola; Lancaster, Pennsylvania, U.S.
- Genres: Electronic, new wave, synthpop, film score, dance
- Occupations: Musician, songwriter
- Instruments: Keyboards, synthesizer, piano, drums
- Years active: 1981–present
- Label: Scarlet Moon Records
- Website: vincedicola.com

Vincent Louis DiCola is an American composer, keyboardist and arranger. He has composed scores for films such as Staying Alive, Rocky IV and The Transformers: The Movie. DiCola also pioneered the use of sequencers on his soundtrack recording for Rocky IV, one of the first to exploit the Fairlight CMI and Synclavier II's computer's sequencing capabilities.

== Life and career ==
After majoring in percussion in college, DiCola began his professional music career upon moving to California in 1981. One of his early credits as a session musician was his synthesizer performance on Juice Newton's albums Dirty Looks and Old Flame released in 1983 and 1985, respectively. His first major break came when he was chosen to co-write several songs on the Staying Alive soundtrack (1983) with Frank Stallone. Following his work on the Staying Alive project, he was recruited by Sylvester Stallone to write the original score for Rocky IV (1985), followed by scoring The Transformers: The Movie (1986). Since then, he has been active in the capacity of producer, recorded and performed as both a solo artist and member of several bands, and continues to work as a session musician and contributor to film soundtracks as composer and performer.

DiCola counts Yes and Emerson, Lake & Palmer among his biggest influences in progressive rock music. He also admires film-music composers Thomas Newman, John Powell and Jerry Goldsmith.

== Awards ==
In 1983, DiCola was a co-nominee for the Best Album of Original Score Written for a Motion Picture or Television Special Grammy Award for co-writing the soundtrack of the movie Staying Alive, in spite of the poor critical reception of the film. He also received a Golden Globe Award nomination for Best Original Song – Motion Picture for the song "Far from Over", which he co-wrote with Frank Stallone for the same film.

At the time, critics didn't appreciate his usage of electronic music in the Rocky IV soundtrack and he received a Golden Raspberry Award for Worst Musical Score as a result.

== Transformers ==
DiCola has had enough of a cult following amongst fans of The Transformers to have warranted the release of several albums of music related to the Transformers movie, as follow-ups to the release of The Transformers: The Movie soundtrack (1986).

First released as a BotCon'97 exclusive, the two-CD set Til All Are One contains the first full score of the movie. BotCon 2001 saw the releases of The Protoform Sessions (featuring demos and rarities and including extended commentary from DiCola) and Artistic Transformations: Themes and Variations, containing solo piano renditions of songs from the soundtrack, as well as another complete score on a single disc named Lighting Their Darkest Hour.

He has been a guest at multiple Transformers conventions, including appearances at BotCon'97, BotCon'98, BotCon 2000 and The Official Transformers Collectors' Convention 2004 in Rosemont, Illinois.

An interview with DiCola was included on the Region 1 DVD release of The Transformers: The Movie released by Rhino Entertainment in the year 2000. However, this interview is not present on the 20th Anniversary Edition released by Sony and BMG in 2006.

In the crossover mobile game Angry Birds Transformers (2014), DiCola returns as a composer on the video game's soundtrack. He later returns to help score the action-adventure game Transformers: Devastation (2015). DiCola credits his work on Transformers with getting his music exposed to a much wider audience and getting him the most attention and fame he has had as an artist.

== Solo works ==
DiCola released his first solo work in 1986, an album simply titled Piano Solos. He later worked both as an arranger and performer on a 1991 multi-artist project called Artfully Beatles, which led him to release Artistically Beatles, an album of ten Beatles songs he arranged and performed, in 1993.

An additional solo album called Falling Off a Clef was released in 2004. In the same year, he completed the soundtrack to the low-rated 2004 film Sci-Fighter, collaborating with the composer Kenny Meriedeth in October 2003, using Kenny's synthesizer and sound banks. The album Falling Off a Clef contains six new tracks (Castle of the Gods suite, Alien March, Fallen Angel, FS#7, A. P.B., Castle of the Gods Variation) + a selection of 20 tracks from Sci-Fighter soundtrack.

== Other works ==
In addition to his solo work, DiCola has worked with various musical groups.

In 1991–92, he began working with the 5-piece rock band Storming Heaven, releasing the album Life in Paradise in 1996. In addition to DiCola on keyboards, guitar and vocals, the Storming Heaven lineup included lead vocalist Rick Livingston, Jethro Tull drummer Doane Perry, guitarist Curtis Taylor, and keyboardist Casey Young. Life in Paradise was written during 1991.

The band was originally formed in January 1991. They spent the first half of the year creating the start of a musical suite entitled "Jessie's Journey", an idea that later was abandoned in favor of individual songs. "It was supposed to be an entire album based on a kind of science fiction theme. Those first four songs ("Cross the Line", "Red Knight", "The Passage" and "Dream House"), they're sort of like the opening four songs of a suite."

Around the same time in 1996, DiCola, Storming Heaven bandmate Doane Perry, and Tower of Power vocalist Ellis Hall formed a soul/progressive-rock trio named Thread and released their one and only self-titled album on CD.

In 1999, he recorded experimental and largely improvisational instrumental tracks under the name of The Firing Squad. These recordings remain officially unreleased but several tracks have been posted on YouTube.

In 2001, he worked again with Perry and released In-VINCE-ible!, a collection of diverse works from various past projects, with ex-members of Santana and Chicago assisting as session musicians, and featuring several special guests including Steve Walsh of Kansas and his Storming Heaven bandmates.

DiCola appeared as keyboardist on the first Hughes Turner Project album HTP in 2003.

He and Perry once again formed a trio, this time with bassist Paul Ill and called DPI, to release a three-track EP called Found Objects in 2006. Previously the trio had worked with vocalist Vincent Kendall and guitarist Reeves Gabrels in releasing a 42-minute suite called "Pity the Rich" based on recordings made at the same time. The jam-session style recordings for these releases were originally intended to be part of a new DiCola solo instrumental release, but while editing the tracks in his home studio DiCola felt they had the feel of a project for a band and chose to expand his original plan to include the other performers.

In 2007, "Paulie's Robot" from Rocky IV was used in the episode of Family Guy, "Movin' Out", and in 2010, "Training Montage", also from the Rocky IV soundtrack, was used in the episode "Something, Something, Something, Dark Side".

In 2008, he was featured on the Gran Turismo 5 Prologue Original Soundtrack and was responsible (along with guitarist Doug Bossi) for arranging the series theme, "Moon Over the Castle", which was written by Masahiro Andoh of T-Square, with which DiCola worked on their 2001 album Truth 21c (released as T-Square Plus).

He described his work on the Gran Turismo's soundtrack's project in an interview with Music4Games, noting that he collaborated with T-Square and Doug Bossi on the project, and looks forward to becoming involved with game music in the future.

In 2009, he composed the song "Bound and Gagged" as a submission for Transformers: Revenge of the Fallen. The track featured DiCola on keyboards and drums, Kenny Meriedeth on guitars, and Rick Livingstone on vocals but was not selected by Michael Bay for the Transformers II soundtrack.

In 2011, he began composing music for the video game Saturday Morning RPG from Mighty Rabbit Studios. The game released on the iTunes App Store in March 2012.

In 2012, DiCola recorded the official theme for Chikara's King of Trios professional wrestling event, alongside Kenny Meriedeth.

In 2013, DiCola released a Christmas medley that was featured as a part of the Saturday Morning RPG soundtrack ahead of a planned full soundtrack release for the game.

In 2014, DiCola along with Kenny Meriedeth, wrote the music for Angry Birds Transformers for Rovio.

In 2015, DiCola also wrote original music for the video game Transformers: Devastation.

In 2016, DiCola also alongside Meriedeth wrote original music for the video game Teenage Mutant Ninja Turtles: Mutants in Manhattan.

In 2019, DiCola features on the song "This Isn't Love" from the album Exhibits by the rock band Work of Art. He also toured in 2019 with Glenn Hughes playing keyboards on his 'Glenn Hughes Performs Classic Deep Purple' tour.

== Filmography ==
- Staying Alive (1983)
- Rocky IV (1985)
- The Transformers: The Movie (1986)

== Discography ==
- Piano Solos (1986)
- Artistically Beatles (1993)
- Life in Paradise (1996, as member of Storming Heaven)
- Thread (1996, as member of Thread)
- In-VINCE-ible! (2001)
- Falling off a Clef (2004)
