= Ernie Burnes =

Australian rules footballer, born 1907

Personal information
- Full name: Ernie Burnes
- Born: 29 October 1907
- Died: 4 January 1969 (aged 61)
- Original team: Brighton

Playing career^{1}
Years	Club	Games (Goals)
1932	Fitzroy	4 (2)
- ^{1} Playing statistics correct to the end of 1932.

Ernie Burnes (29 October 1907 – 4 January 1969) was an Australian rules footballer who played with Fitzroy in the Victorian Football League (VFL).
