= Daniel Taylor (writer) =

American writer (born 1948)

Daniel Taylor (born 1948) is an American writer. He is the author of nine books, including The Myth of Certainty, Letters to My Children, Tell Me A Story: The Life-Shaping Power of Our Stories, In Search of Sacred Places: Looking for Wisdom on Celtic Holy Islands, and Creating a Spiritual Legacy: How to Share Your Stories, Values, and Wisdom. He speaks frequently at conferences, colleges, retreats, and churches on a variety of topics. Taylor is also co-founder of The Legacy Center, an organization devoted to helping individuals and organizations identify and preserve the values and stories that have shaped their lives. He was a contributing editor of Books and Culture.

A recurring topic in Taylor’s work is the role of stories in shaping lives. He points out that we are born into stories, live in stories, and die leaving a legacy of stories. Stories, he argues, are the single best way human beings have discovered for preserving and making sense of their experience, and understanding this increases one’s ability to make one’s own life story a rich one.

In addition to his books and articles, Taylor has served as a stylist for several Bible translations, including the New Living Translation and a revision of the New Century Version. He also co-produced The Expanded Bible (2011).

Taylor received his B.A. from Westmont College in Santa Barbara, California and an M.A. and Ph.D in English from Emory University in Atlanta, Georgia. He taught literature and writing at Bethel University for thirty-three years.

== Personal life ==
Taylor is married and the father of four children. He currently resides in Saint Paul, Minnesota.

== Selected publications ==
- The Myth of Certainty (1986, IVP Books, 1999) ISBN 0-8308-2237-2
- Letters to My Children: A Father Passes on His Values (1989, Bog Walk Press, 2010) ISBN 0-9706511-2-0
- Tell Me a Story: The Life-Shaping Power of Our Stories (Bog Walk Press, 2001) ISBN 0-9706511-0-4 (Originally published as The Healing Power of Story, Doubleday, 1996)
- Before Their Time: Lessons in Living from Those Born Too Soon (InterVarsity Press, 2000) ISBN 978-0-8308-2265-2
- Is God Intolerant?: Christian Thinking about the Call for Tolerance (Tyndale House Publisher, 2003) ISBN 0-8423-5439-5
- In Search of Sacred Places: Looking for Wisdom on Celtic Holy Islands (Bog Walk Press, 2005) ISBN 0-9706511-1-2
- The Expanded Bible (Thomas Nelson, 2009) ISBN 0-7180-1984-9
- Creating a Spiritual Legacy: How to Share Your Stories, Values, and Wisdom (Brazos Press, 2011) ISBN 1587432757
- Death Comes for the Deconstructionist (Wipf and Stock) ISBN 9781625649317

== Online writings ==
- Rest for the Weary: Eliot’s Four Quartets, Books and Culture, January/February 2009
- How to Pick a President: Why Virtue Trumps Policy, Christianity Today, June 2008
- Living with a Big Poem: Reflections on the Waste Land, Books and Culture, September/October 2005
- Many Bibles, One Scripture: The Gift of Translation, Books and Culture, September/October 2002
- Wizards and Hobbits, Books and Culture, May/June 1996
- In Pursuit of Character, Part I, Christianity Today, December 1995
- In Pursuit of Character, Part II, Christianity Today, December 1995
