= Transformers: Revenge of the Fallen – The Score =

Film score by Steve Jablonsky
- Released: June 12, 2009 (UK); June 23, 2009 (US)
- Recorded: Remote Control Productions
- Genre: Film score
- Length: 43:53
- Label: Reprise
- Producers: Steve Jablonsky; Bob Badami; Ramiro Belgardt

Transformers: Revenge of the Fallen – The Score is a soundtrack that features the musical score composed and arranged by Steve Jablonsky for the 2009 film Transformers: Revenge of the Fallen. It was released physically on June 23, 2009. The score was first released as a digital download in the United Kingdom on June 12, 2009.

== Track listing ==
The tracks were announced on June 10, 2009. The following tracks are listed in order:

#	Track name	Scene and musical description	Length
1.	"Prime"	"Prime" is the primary theme for the character Optimus Prime, as well as the Autobots as a whole. Borrowing from Optimus' theme from the 2007 Transformers film, it begins with low arpeggio strings building into a rising melody, with the choir joining the orchestra towards the end. Though not used completely in the film, it is used in various scenes including, when dead Optimus Prime arrives at NEST base and when Jetfire tells Sam, Mikaela, Leo and Simmons about the Primes.	2:14
2.	"Einstein's Wrong"	"Einstein's Wrong" serves as the theme to Sam Witwicky in this film, played with various mallet and percussion instruments, backed up by a set of cellos. This cue takes motifs from "Sam at the Lake" (from the previous score), however is much darker in tone than its predecessor. It begins with simmering mallets, with slow, dark strings providing a moving bassline. Halfway through the cue, it builds with the choir chanting the Decepticon theme (dominant in the first film) and fades back slowly into the same simmering mallet/slow string melody. It ends with the cellos slowly fading out. It is primarily used when Sam has his mental breakdown in class, Simmons briefs Sam about what he knows about Cybertronian history on Earth and when searching for Jetfire.	3:35
3.	"NEST"	"NEST" (Nonbiological Extraterrestrial Species Treaty/Networked Elements: Supporters and Transformers) contains instrumental excerpts from Linkin Park's hit single, "New Divide" that originally appeared on Transformers: Revenge of the Fallen – The Album. The cue begins with low electric guitar motifs and hi-hat stabs and quickly follows into the main theme from New Divide. It builds, with drums in full force, and choir joins in subtly. A few more guitar motifs are mentioned, and then the full orchestra joins in on the New Divide theme. The cue ends with a pulsating guitar theme and a gong stab. Used only when NEST team are searching for Decepticons and when Bumblebee and Optimus Prime save Sam, Mikaela and Leo from Megatron, Starscream and Doktor.	2:08
4.	"The Shard"	"The Shard" contains a mixture of two themes: the new Prime theme as well as a reworked theme from the track "The All Spark", found in the previous score. It begins with the string arpeggio found in the cue of "The All Spark". It generally builds into the "All Spark" theme being played backwards as it represents the evil found in the last piece found on Earth. It then builds further into a four-note string and synthesizer pulse, followed quickly by a militaristic brass and drum melody. It ends with the strings increasing, followed by a low synthesizer.Used many times in the movie including:when Sam drops the shard of the all spark into the kitchen and creates kitchen bots, when Arcee and Sideswipe chase Sideways, when Ravage steals the shard from Diego Garcia, when Alice tries to kill Sam, when Grindor kidnaps Sam and when Bumblebee fights Rampage.	2:42
5.	"The Fallen"	"The Fallen" cue serves as the main theme for the main antagonist, "The Fallen" as well as the Decepticons in this film. The track begins with a low synthesizer beat, slowly building. It quickly goes into a surrealistic version of the Fallen's theme, a four-note harmonic melody, using a mixture of human voice and synthesizer. It builds, and is followed by hard electronic pulses, found in the Decepticons' cue from the first film, ending with a bass roll. Used when Gallaway debates Optimus Prime at NEST HQ, The Fallen and Megatron talk about their next course of action aboard the Nemesis and when Doktor examines Sam.	4:03
6.	"Infinite White"	"Infinite White" is a suite taking cue from the Optimus theme found on the first track. It begins with a human voice (provided by artist Lisbeth Scott) singing and/or chanting Prime's melody. It builds with slow sweeping percussion and drums. The percussion soon ends, and a full string suite begins taking form from the All Spark theme. It ends with Middle Eastern-esque technological tones. Used when Sam, Mikaela, Leo and Simmons arrive at Petra.	3:58
7.	"Heed Our Warning"	"Heed Our Warning" This was never used in Revenge of the Fallen but was used in Transformers: Dark of the Moon when the Decepticons begin destroying Chicago. It starts off with low synth inspired beats, and rises with the choir and percussion joining in. The All Spark, Sam, Decepticon, and Fallen themes are all interwoven throughout the cue.	4:26
8.	"The Fallen's Arrival"	"The Fallen's Arrival" cue is used during the scenes when Optimus Prime dies in front of Sam and when the Fallen himself travels to Earth to complete his plans to destroy life on Earth. The track uses motifs and instrumentation found in "The Fallen", but is noticeably changed.	3:47
9.	"Tomb of the Primes"	"Tomb of the Primes" uses the Prime theme in conjunction with brass, drums, and sweeping strings. Lisbeth Scott's voice is also heard throughout the track, especially towards the beginning. Hints of the "New Divide" and "What I've Done" theme are also interwoven throughout the cue. Used in the scene where the humans discover the Tomb of the Primes, and hence find the Matrix.	2:47
10.	"Forest Battle"	"Forest Battle" begins as mixture of three themes, Sector 7 and Autobots from the first film, and the Fallen from this film. Moving into a choral chant that is stylistically reflective of the Decepticons theme, it culminates in a brass fanfare at the end of the track. Used in the scene in which Optimus fights Megatron, Starscream and Grindor.	2:04
11.	"Precious Cargo"	"Precious Cargo" uses both the new Prime theme and the Autobots' theme from the first film. It is used in the scene in which Sam and Mikaela are trying to reach the soldiers and Optimus.	1:38
12.	"Matrix of Leadership"	"Matrix of Leadership" begins with low synth and strings and Lisbeth Scott's voice chants Prime's melody. The strings soon move into a reworked version of the Bumblebee theme found from the first film, and eventually the theme is woven within the Prime theme. The track ends with a reflection of "Arrival to Earth", on the first film's score album. Used in the scene in which Sam "dies" whilst trying to get to Optimus.	3:50
13.	"I Claim Your Sun"	"I Claim Your Sun" is used during the climactic scene when the Fallen uses the Matrix to activate the Sun Harvester and fight Optimus Prime. The track begins with guitars, electronics, and strings before briefly using a motif from "New Divide". The track then fades into a quick version of the Fallen's theme, short followed by the Autobots theme. Sounds from the track, "You're a Soldier Now" (on the previous score) and "The Fallen" ends the track.	3:06
14.	"I Rise, You Fall"	"I Rise, You Fall" begins with the Fallen's theme played using an ancient instrument, called the duduk. The choir joins in on the theme, and then the theme slowly fades away leaving quiet cellos. Acoustic guitar joins in, and Prime's theme begins to play. Much of the track includes direct recomposition from the cue, "No Sacrifice, No Victory", from the first score. Used in the scene where Optimus Prime defeats the Fallen and the humans are getting together to enjoy the aftermath.	3:35

== Personnel ==
- "NEST" contains instrumental excerpt of "New Divide" written and performed by Linkin Park, produced by Mike Shinoda
- Score composed and arranged by Steve Jablonsky
- Album produced by Steve Jablonsky, Bob Badami and Ramiro Belgardt
- Executive soundtrack album producer: Michael Bay
- Executive in Charge of Music for Paramount Pictures: Randy Spendlove
- Album Compiled by Katia Lewin Palomo
- Music Recorded & Mixed by Alan Meyerson
- Orchestra Conducted by Nick Glennie-Smith
- Orchestrators: Bruce Fowler, Suzette Moriarty, Walter Fowler, Rick Giovinazzo, Penka Kouneva, Elizabeth Finch, and Kevin Kaska
- Music Consultant: Bob Badami
- Music Production Services: Steven Kofsky, Mike Shinoda
- Supervising Music Editor: Peter Snell
- Additional Music by Lorne Balfe
- Ambient Music Design by Clay Duncan, Howard Scarr, and Andrew Kawczynski
- Music Programming: Ryeland Allison
- Featured Vocalist: Lisbeth Scott
- Featured Guitarists: George Doering, Heitor Pereira
- Ethnic Winds: Pedro Eustache
- Featured Cellist: Martin Tillman
- Bass: Nico Abondolo
- Choir Conducted by: Gavin Greenaway
- Choir Coordinator: Andrew Zack
- Music Preparation by Booker White
- Music Contractors: Peter Rotter, Sandy DeCrescent
- Additional Recordings by Jeff Biggers and Albert Clay
- Engineering Assistant: Katia Lewin Palomo
- Technical Score Engineers: Doug Clow and Pieter Schlosser
- Synth Programming by Hans Zimmer and Jacob Shea
- Music Technical Assistant: Noah Sorota
- Score Mixed at Remote Control Productions
- Score Recorded at Sony Scoring Stage
- Album Mastered by Louie Teran at Marcussen Mastering
- Music published by Paramount Bella Music (BMI)/Songs of SKG (BMI)
- Album Art Direction by BLT

Bass – Bruce Morgenthaler, Christian Kollgaard, David Parmeter, Drew Dembowski*, Edward Meares, Oscar Hidalgo, Susan Ranney

Bass [1st], Soloist – Nico Abondolo*

Cello – Armen Ksajikian, Cecelia Tsan*, Christine Ermacoff, David Speltz, Dennis Karmazyn, Erika Duke Kirkpatrick*, George Kim Scholes, Paula Hochhalter, Steve Richards, Suzie Katayama, Timothy Landauer*

Cello [1st] – Steve Erdody

Cello, Soloist – Martin Tillman

Guitar, Soloist – George Doering, Heitor Pereira

French Horn – Brian O'Connor, David Duke, Phillip Yao*, Richard Todd, Yvonne S. Moriarty*

French Horn [1st] – James Thatcher*

Percussion – Brad Dutz, Danny Greco, Luis Conte, M.B. Gordy*, Paulinho DaCosta, Wade Culbreath

Trombone – Andy Martin*, Bill Reichenbach*, Phillip A. Teele*, Steven Holtman*

Trombone [1st] – Charles Loper

Tuba – Jim Self*

Tuba [1st] – Doug Tornquist

Viola – Alma L. Fernandez*, Andrew Duckles, Darrin McCann, David Walther*, Maria Newman, Marlow Fisher, Rob Brophy*, Shawn Mann, Thomas Diener

Viola [1st] – Brian Dembow

Violin – Alyssa Park, Anatoly Rosinsky, Bruce Dukov, Darius Campo, Dimitrie Leivici, Eun-Mee Ahn, Helen Nightengale, Jay Rosen, Joel Pargman*, Josefina Vergara, Katia Popov, Kenneth Yerke, Kevin Connolly, Lisa M. Sutton*, Lorenz Gamma, Miwako Watanabe, Natalie Leggett, Neil E. Samples*, Phillip Levy, Roberto Cani, Roger Wilkie, Sara Parkins, Sarah Thornblade, Searmi Park, Serena McKinney*, Shalini Vijayan, Sid Page

Violin [P2] – Julie Ann Gigante*

Violin, Concertmaster – Endre Granat

Vocals [Featured Vocalist] – Lisbeth Scott

Wind [Ethnic Winds], Soloist – Pedro Eustache
