= Daniel Taylor (environmentalist) =

American environmentalist

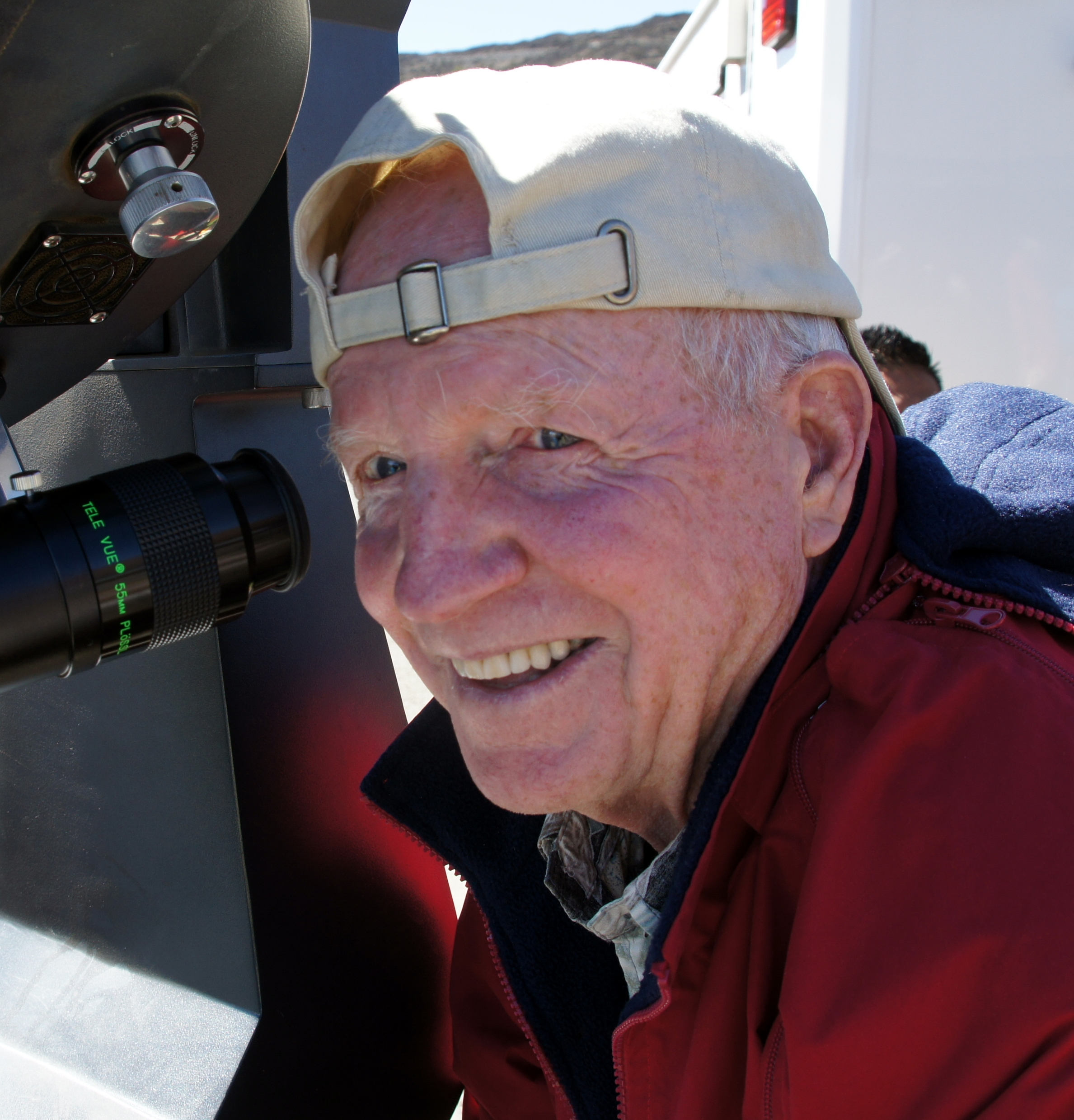
- Born: Daniel David Taylor; May 23, 1938 (age 88); Santa Fe, New Mexico, U.S.
- Known for: Nature conservation

Academic background
- Education: San Francisco State University (BS); University of California, Berkeley (MS)

Daniel David Taylor (born May 23, 1938) is an American nature protection specialist. He was the head of the resources management department at Hawaii Volcanoes National Park from 1979–1996, and is known for his environmental activities in Africa, Asia, California and Hawaii.

== Early life and education ==
Born in 1938 in Santa Fe, New Mexico, Taylor's family lived in New Mexico before moving to Colorado in 1941 and Sonoma, California in 1948.

Taylor attended San Francisco State University from 1956 to 1960 and the University of California, Berkeley.

== Career ==
After college, Taylor volunteered to teach geography for children in Ugandan for five years, in a Catholic mission school near Kampala.

=== National Park Service ===
1968 he started to work in Yosemite National Park in the Resources Management Department where he was tasked with restoring natural conditions to the forest. A lack of fire over the previous 150 had limited the growth of trees due to excess undergrowth and presence of pests. He was involved in the development of a program for controlled, periodic burning that would not damage the mature trees. The fire program was used in other national parks and Taylor transferred to the Sequoia National Park to develop a fire program there.

He worked with researcher Bruce M. Kilgore and they continued the burning research programs in other national parks such as Yosemite, Grand Canyon, North Cascades in Washington State, where he was in charge of the back country program. He then transferred to the Glaciers National Park. Taylor and his colleagues had to pay close attention to the condition of the fuel, so it would only burn materials such as dead wood, small trees, and grasses.

=== Hawaii ===
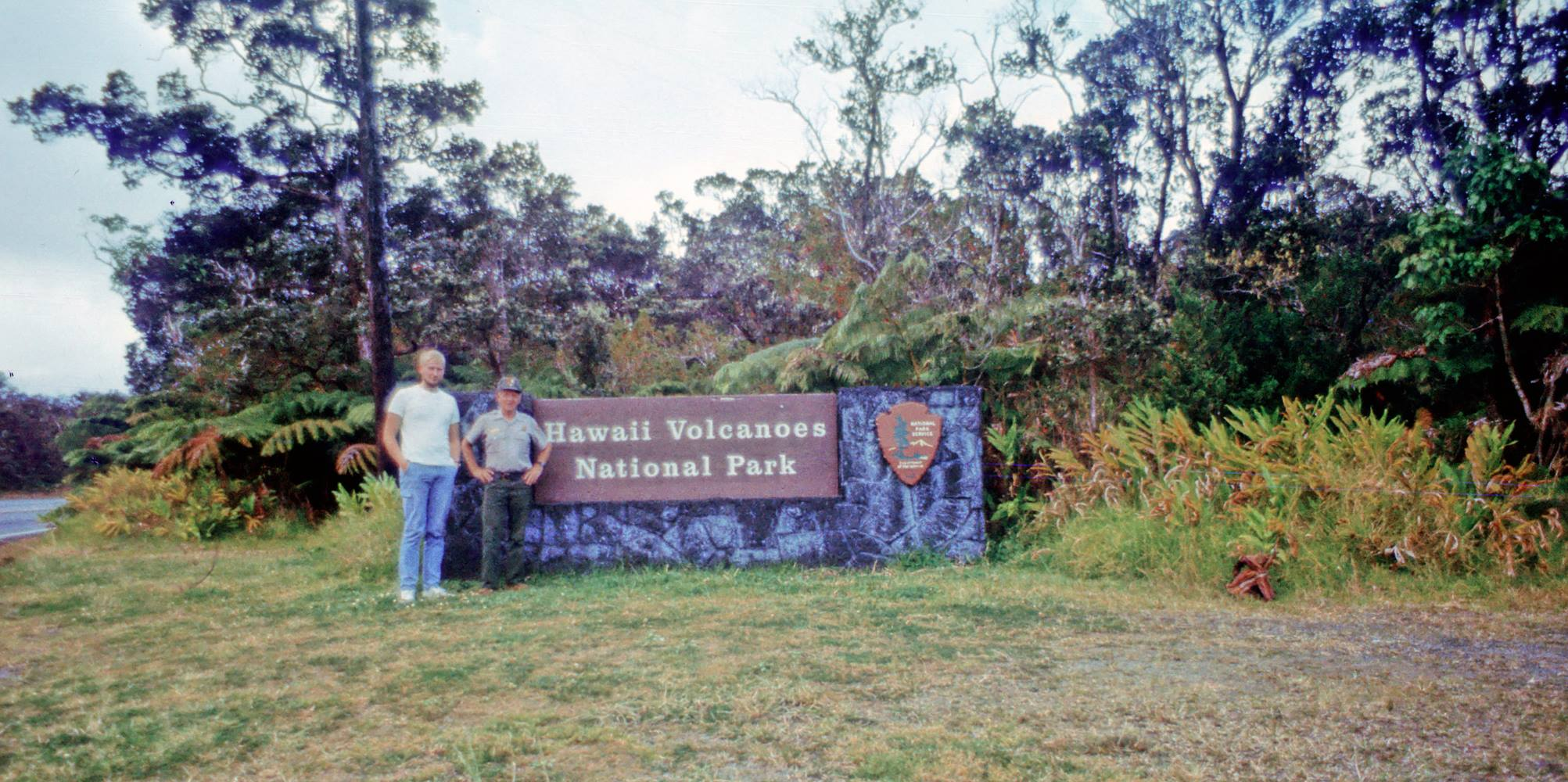
Dan Taylor, 1989

Don Reeser had transferred to Redwoods National Park, Dan Taylor succeeded him as Resources Management Division Chief in Hawaii Volcanoes National Park in fall 1979. Taylor was put in charge of the natural resources management program, focusing on the problem of controlling feral pigs, goats and other wild cattle and invasive plants. He spent the next 28 years working in this program, hoping to remove the goats and pigs and helping to put back native plants which had practically disappeared from the system and also putting back some of the rare animals.

He and Larry Katahira (Wildlife Specialist) developed new method of monitoring feral goats using radio-collared devices. They used it to track feral goats for purposes of removing remnant groups.

He managed international research programs as part of the National Park Service "Volunteers in a Park" program.

Taylor retired in 1996 and continued nature protection activities in Asia, Africa, then on the island of Hawaii, mostly around the community of Volcano.

== Awards ==
- 1991: NPS Award for Natural Resource Management

== Bibliography ==
- Kilgore B. M., Taylor D. D. Fire history of a sequoia mixed conifer forest // Ecology. 1979. Vol. 60. P. 129–142.
- Taylor D. Controlling exotic plants in Hawaii Volcanoes National Park // Proceedings, Third Conference in Natural Sciences, Hawaii Volcanoes National Park. Hawaii Field Research Center, 1980 P. 349-354.
- Stone C. P., Taylor D. D. Status of feral pig management and research in Hawaii Volcanoes National Park // Cooperative National Park Resources Studies. University of Hawaii at Manoa, 1982. P. 106-117.
- Stone C. P., Taylor D. D. Status of feral pig management and research in Hawaii Volcanoes National Park // Smith C.W editor. Proceedings of the Fifth Conference in Natural Sciences Hawaii Volcanoes National Park: [Honolulu. June 5–7, 1984]. University of Hawaii at Manoa. 1984. P. 106—117.
- Taylor D., Stone C. P. Controlling feral pigs in Hawaii Volcanoes National Park // Conference of Scientific Research of National Parks. 1986. Vol. 4. P. 193. (abstract).
- Taylor D., Katahira L. Radio telemetry as an aid in eradicating remnant feral goats // Wildl. Soc. Bull. 1988. Vol. 16. P. 297—299.
- Taylor D. Managing the people's cave in Hawaii Volcanoes National Park // Geo. 1991. Vol. 19. N 1. P. 28.
- Taylor D. Restoring endangered species in Hawaii Volcanoes National Park // Endangered species technical bulletin. 1994. Vol. 19. N 2. P. 18-19.

== See also ==
- Hawaiʻi Volcanoes National Park
- Hugo Huntzinger
- Olaa Forest
