= Transformers: Age of Extinction – The Score =

Film score / EP by Steve Jablonsky
- Released: June 30, 2014 (EP); July 3, 2014 (score)
- Recorded: December 2013 – June 2014 at Los Angeles, California and Las Vegas, Nevada
- Genres: Film score; alternative rock; symphonic rock; progressive rock
- Length: 19:33 (EP); 77:42 (score)
- Label: Paramount

Transformers: Age of Extinction – The Score is a two-part soundtrack album for the 2014 film of the same name. The score was written by Steve Jablonsky, with help from fellow composer Hans Zimmer and additional music by alternative rock band Imagine Dragons. An EP was released on June 30, 2014, which features four suites, and serves as a teaser for the score, which was released on July 3, 2014. Both albums were released through the film's distributor Paramount Pictures.

== Background ==
As with the previous three films of the franchise, Steve Jablonsky handled the film's score, and it is his sixth collaboration with director Michael Bay. Jablonsky and Bay worked on the score from December 2013 to June 2014, one month before the film's release, which exhausted Jablonsky. The two focused on creating themes for the film's new characters, although the two mutually decided to incorporate some of the themes of the first trilogy.

Jablonsky also collaborated with fellow composer Hans Zimmer and alternative rock band Imagine Dragons in the score, as well as the film's theme song, "Battle Cry". Bay wanted to work with Imagine Dragons after being "drawn to the emotion of 'Demons' and 'Radioactive' the first time [he] heard those songs, and [he] knew [he] wanted that same energy and heart for this movie." About his collaboration with the band Jablonsky said, "It immediately hit me more than some of the previous ones [I] had done...it was a much closer collaboration than I've had in the past," compared to his previous collaborations with bands Linkin Park and Goo Goo Dolls. Imagine Dragons had finished touring for two years their debut album, Night Visions (2012), and wanted to work on their next studio album, before Bay called them to work on the film's score. The band felt that working on the film could increase their music's exposure worldwide. Imagine Dragons was brought to Los Angeles for the collaboration; Jablonsky also traveled to the band's studio in Las Vegas, Nevada to record with the band. The band's lead singer Dan Reynolds recorded vocals, while drummer Daniel Platzman played the viola. Composer Joseph Trapanese also provided additional music for the film.

On June 30, 2014, Jablonsky released an extended play featuring four tracks as a teaser for the official score, which features variations of the four themes. On July 3, 2014, three days after the EP's release, the official score was released on iTunes, although Jablonsky stated that physical copies will "[take] a bit longer."

On October 7, 2014, the score was released on CD by record label La-La Land Records. It is a limited edition of 3000 units.

On November 20, 2014, Steve Jablonsky commented via Facebook that the score would no longer be sold on iTunes after it had reached its limit of 15,000 units before re-use fees would have to be paid. Jablonsky personally expressed his own disappointment in the turn of events, hoping there would be a way to eventually re-release the score, along with the score to Transformers: Dark of the Moon, which also had been removed on iTunes several months prior when it also reached the 15,000 unit limit.

== Track listing ==
=== Transformers: Age of Extinction – The EP ===
All tracks are written by Steve Jablonsky

No.	Title	Length
1.	"Hunted"	5:57
2.	"Tessa"	5:45
3.	"Autobots Reunite"	2:57
4.	"Lockdown"	4:54
Total length:		19:33

=== Transformers: Age of Extinction – The Score ===
All tracks are written by Steve Jablonsky

No.	Title	Length
1.	"Decision"	4:20
2.	"Best Thing That Ever Happened"	2:06
3.	"I'm an Autobot"	5:06
4.	"Optimus Is Alive"	2:17
5.	"Cemetery Wind"	5:53
6.	"His Name Is Shane and He Drives"	5:17
7.	"Hacking the Drone"	2:05
8.	"Transformium"	3:24
9.	"Galvatron Is Online"	1:56
10.	"Your Creators Want You Back"	3:26
11.	"The Final Knight"	4:07
12.	"Punch Hold Slide Repeat"	2:12
13.	"The Presence of Megatron"	2:51
14.	"Galvatron Is Active"	4:13
15.	"Have Faith Prime"	1:29
16.	"Hong Kong Chase"	1:43
17.	"The Legend Exists"	1:16
18.	"Dinobot Charge"	6:37
19.	"That's a Big Magnet"	2:51
20.	"Drive Backwards"	2:05
21.	"Honor to the End"	5:18
22.	"Leave Planet Earth Alone"	3:47
23.	"The Knight Ship"	3:21
Total length:		77:42

== Complete score ==
On 21 December 2014, Paramount released the complete score for the film as part of their "For Your Consideration (FYC)" campaign. This soundtrack contains the score as heard in the final film, featuring both unreleased tracks as well as film edits of previously released tracks. For unknown reasons, the track "The Legend Exists" from the standard soundtrack is absent. Two of the tracks ("Dogs Chase Tessa/Searching for Tessa" and "Weapons Room") are also listed in the tracklist but feature no audio.

No.	Title	Length
1.	"Opening/Main Title/The Past"	2:52
2.	"History is About to Change"	1:36
3.	"Didn't Make the Varsity Team"	0:42
4.	"Hey Snakeballs"	0:44
5.	"No Financial Aid"	1:06
6.	"The Age of the Transformers is Over"	1:50
7.	"Cade Brings Truck Home"	0:35
8.	"Cade Works on Truck in Barn"	0:33
9.	"Beer Bot Fails"	1:07
10.	"Tessa Complains about Being the Only Adult"	1:15
11.	"Ratchet Killed"	4:58
12.	"Attinger Talks to White House Guy"	0:40
13.	"Painter Bot Broken"	0:54
14.	"Non Dating Household"	1:14
15.	"Judgement Day"	0:24
16.	"Lucas Arrives at the House"	0:14
17.	"We Just Found a Transformer"	1:11
18.	"Optimus Prime Lives"	2:21
19.	"Attinger Talks to Lockdown"	1:29
20.	"Attinger Sends Cemetary Wind to Cade Farm/Lockdown Gets into Position"	2:30
21.	"Optimus Comes to Humans Defence"	6:15
22.	"His Name is Shane and He Drives"	1:49
23.	"Car Chase"	0:57
24.	"Car Chase Continues Through Factory"	2:39
25.	"Death of a Friend"	1:57
26.	"Cade Take Matters into His Own Hands"	0:35
27.	"Cade Takes Matters into His Own Hands Part 2"	1:37
28.	"Monument Valley/Autobots Unite"	2:29
29.	"Monument Valley Transition"	0:34
30.	"Autobots Angry with Humans"	1:25
31.	"KSI Chicago"	0:54
32.	"Transformium"	3:02
33.	"Fresh Breath When Making out with Your Daughter"	0:33
34.	"Galvatron at KSI/Joshua Gets Mad "Why Can't We Make What I Want""	1:21
35.	"Cade Gets Badge/Sneaks Into KSI"	0:56
36.	"Attacking KSI"	5:40
37.	"Respond"	0:48
38.	"Galvitron"	1:32
39.	"Highway Battle"	1:20
40.	"Galvitron Chases Optimus"	0:48
41.	"Angry Optimus" (Plays between tracks 36 and 37 in the film)	1:15
42.	"Galvitron vs. Optimus"	1:24
43.	"Lockdown"	3:08
44.	"Tessa Taken"	1:01
45.	"The Knightship/Racing to the Knightship"	3:13
46.	"Engage Dark Matter Drives"	0:34
47.	"Enter the Knightship"	2:02
48.	"Dogs Chase Tessa/Searching for Tessa" (No audio on this track)	1:17
49.	"Weapons Room" (No audio on this track)	2:07
50.	"Knightship Gunfight"	0:39
51.	"Reunited"	0:49
52.	"Highwires"	1:43
53.	"Fighter Chase"	2:10
54.	"Autobots Find Prime"	1:14
55.	"Presence of Megatron"	3:26
56.	"KSI to China"	0:47
57.	"Lockdown Goes after Prime"	0:31
58.	"Galvitron Activates Prototypes"	4:40
59.	"Cade Talks to Optimus"	1:37
60.	"Hong Kong Motorcycle Chase"	1:58
61.	"Elevator Fight"	1:31
62.	"Prototypes Entering Hong Kong"	0:29
63.	"Prototypes Arriving in Square"	0:36
64.	"Prototypes Search for the Bomb"	0:35
65.	"Battle of Hong Kong"	1:28
66.	"You Want Me"	1:04
67.	"Hong Kong Footchase"	1:40
68.	"Apartment Fight"	1:11
69.	"Hiding in the Glass House"	1:00
70.	"Dinos"	6:38
71.	"Knightship Comes into Hong Kong"	1:06
72.	"The Magnet"	1:47
73.	"Driving Backwards"	1:33
74.	"Magnet Picking Up Dinobots"	1:51
75.	"Cade Sends Tessa Away in Bumblebee"	0:51
76.	"Lockdown Surfs Down Building"	2:36
77.	"Cade Charge"	0:56
78.	"End Fight with Lockdown"	2:47
79.	"We Don't Have a Home"	1:34
80.	"Leave Planet Earth Alone"	2:42
81.	"Pebbles"	2:08
82.	"Bumblebee vs. Stinger" (Plays between tracks 70 and 71 in the film)	1:36
Total length:		2:19:10

== Personnel ==
- Backing Vocals – Imagine Dragons (tracks: 2, 7, 10, 21, 22)
- Bass – Bruce Morgenthaler, Christian Kollgaard, Drew Dembowski, Edward Meares, Michael Valerio, Oscar Hidalgo, Stephen Dress
- Bass [1st] – Nico Abondolo
- Bass, Soloist – Ben McKee, Chris Chaney
- Cello – Andrew Shulman, Armen Ksajikian, Christina Soule, Dennis Karmazyn, Eric Byers, Kim Scholes, Giovanna Clayton, John Walz, Maurice Grants, Paula Hochhalter, Steve Richards, Suzie Katayama, Timothy Landauer, Timothy Loo
- Cello [1st], Soloist – Steve Erdody
- Cello, Soloist – Cameron Stone, Vanessa Freebairn-Smith
- Conductor – Nick Glennie-Smith
- Contractor – Peter Rotter
- Coordinator [Soundtrack Album] – Jason Richmond
- Copyist [Music Preparation] – Booker White
- Drums, Soloist – Daniel Platzman, Jon Jablonsky, Matt Chamberlain
- Edited By [Music Editors] – Alex Gibson, Bryan Elliot Lawson, John Finklea, Kevin McKeever, Sam Zeines
- Engineer [Technical Score] – Lori Castro
- Erhu, Soloist – Karen Han
- Executive-Producer [For La-La Land Records] – Dan Goldwasser, MV Gerhard, Matt Verboys
- Executive-Producer [Soundtrack Album] – Lorenzo Di Bonaventura, Michael Bay
- Guitar, Soloist – Andrew Synowiec, George Doering, Wayne Sermon
- Horn – Daniel Kelley, Danielle Ondarza, Dylan Hart, Jenny Kim, Mark Adams, Steven Becknell, Teag Reaves
- Horn [1st] – James Thatcher
- Liner Notes – Steve Jablonsky
- Mastered By – Patricia Sullivan
- Music By – Steve Jablonsky
- Music By [Additional] – Dan Reynolds, Daniel Platzman, David Fleming, Hans Zimmer, Jacob Shea, Joe Trapanese, Michael Yezerski, Wayne Sermon
- Orchestrated By – Carl Rydlund, Jennifer Hammond, Walter Fowler, Yvonne S. Moriarty
- Orchestrated By [Supervising] – Bruce Fowler
- Other [Music Production Services] – Arata Music
- Percussion – Jonathan Jablonsky, Matthew Chamberlain
- Percussion [1st], Soloist – Wade Culbreath
- Percussion, Soloist – Brian Kilgore, Gregory Goodall, Gregory Ellis, John Wakefield, MB Gordy
- Producer – Randy Spendlove, Steve Jablonsky
- Recorded By, Mixed By – Jeff Biggers
- Score Editor – David Channing
- Sound Designer [Ambient] – Jon Aschalew
- Technician [Pro Tools Operator] – Kevin Globerman
- Trombone – Bill Reichenbach, Phillip Teele*, Phillip Keen, Steven Holtman, Bill Booth
- Trombone [1st] – Alex Iles
- Tuba – Gary Hickman, Lukas Storm
- Tuba [1st] – Doug Tornquist
- Viola – Alma Fernandez, Andrew Duckles, Darrin Mc Cann, David Walther, Keith Greene, Laura Pearson, Marlow Fisher, Matthew Funes, Pamela Jacobson, Scott Hosfeld, Shawn Mann, Thomas Diener, Victoria Miskolczy
- Viola [1st] – Brian Dembow
- Viola, Soloist – Daniel Platzman, Rob Brophy
- Violin – Alyssa Park, Amy Hershberger, Andrew Bulbrook, Benjamin Jacobson, Bruce Dukov, Charlie Bisharat, Darius Campo, Dimitrie Leivici, Endre Granat, Eun-Mee Ahn, Grace Oh, Helen Nightengale, Irina Voloshina, Jay Rosen, Jessica Guideri, Josefina Vergara, Karen Han, Katia Popov, Kevin Connolly, Lisa Sutton, Lorenz Gamma, Marc Sazer, Natalie Leggett, Neil Samples, Nina Evtuhov, Phillip Levy, Rafael Rishik, Rebecca Bunnell, Rhea Fowler, Roberto Cani, Roger Wilkie, Sara Parkins, Sarah Thornblade, Serena Mc Kinney, Shalini Vijayan, Songa Lee, Tamara Hatwan, Tereza Stanislav, Tiffany Hu, Yelena Yegoryan
- Violin [P2] – Julie Gigante
- Violin, Concertmaster – Belinda Broughton
- Vocals [Soloist] – Dan Reynolds (5)
- Woodwind, Soloist – Chris Bleth
