= Steve Jablonsky =

American composer (born 1970)

- Born: October 9, 1970 (age 56); Los Angeles, California, U.S.
- Genres: Film score, video game music, post-rock, alternative rock, electronic, classical
- Occupations: Film composer, video game composer
- Instruments: Piano, keyboards, guitar, drums
- Years active: 1999–present
- Website: steve-jablonsky.com

Steve Jablonsky (born October 9, 1970) is an American composer for film, television, and video games, best known for his musical scores in the Transformers film series, Desperate Housewives, and The Sims 3. Some of his frequent collaboration partners include film directors Michael Bay and Peter Berg, and fellow composer Hans Zimmer.

== Early life ==
Jablonsky's mother was born in a Japanese internment camp. He went to the University of California, Berkeley for college and studied computer science at first, but switched to music composition a year later. After graduation, he became an intern at Hans Zimmer's Remote Control Productions after cold calling the studio to ask if they needed any help. During that time, Jablonsky met Harry Gregson-Williams, a fellow composer of Zimmer, and started working as his assistant. Later, he became more engaged with Zimmer and started composing for works such as Desperate Housewives and the Transformers film series.

== Career ==
Jablonsky has composed the soundtracks to the films The Texas Chainsaw Massacre (2003), Steamboy (2004), The Island (2005), Transformers (2007), D-War (2007), Transformers: Revenge of the Fallen (2009), Transformers: Dark of the Moon (2011), Battleship (2012), Ender's Game (2013) (replacing renowned film composer James Horner), Transformers: Age of Extinction (2014), and Transformers: The Last Knight (2017). He was also a contributor on Team America: World Police (2004) among many others. In addition, he helped compose some of the music to the video game Metal Gear Solid 2: Sons of Liberty and composed the theme music for BBC's Seven Wonders of the Industrial World in 2003. He also has written music for the television show Desperate Housewives (2004 - 2012) since the fourth episode. His track "Trailblazing" served as the opening theme for WrestleMania X8 and WrestleMania XIX, as well as the soundtrack to the TNA Hall of Fame induction of Sting.

Jablonsky also wrote the music for Command & Conquer 3: Tiberium Wars, taking the place of the former Command & Conquer music composer Frank Klepacki who was unable to write the game's score due to his involvement with Universe at War: Earth Assault.

Jablonsky has worked for Harry Gregson-Williams at Media Ventures, the music production company which was conceived and founded by Jay Rifkin and Hans Zimmer, for seven years. His most recent projects include the scores for the South Korean film D-War, Gears of War 3 for the Xbox 360 gaming console, and music for The Sims 3.

Currently, Jablonsky is employed at Zimmer's studio, Remote Control Productions, having been mentored by the company's members Zimmer and Nick Glennie-Smith, as well as former members Harry Gregson-Williams and Klaus Badelt. Additionally, Jablonsky was very recently invited in September 2024 by rock band Weezer to write some of the music they performed in their Voyage to the Blue Planet Tour.

In February 2015, Jablonsky was hired to compose the score for the film The Last Witch Hunter. He also composed the soundtrack for Teenage Mutant Ninja Turtles: Out of the Shadows, the sequel to Teenage Mutant Ninja Turtles, and the 2016 Peter Berg film Deepwater Horizon, starring Mark Wahlberg and Kurt Russell.

== Discography ==
=== Charted songs ===
==== As lead artist ====
List of charted songs, with year, album and chart positions
Title	Year	Peak chart positions		Album
Title	Year	PAN Int.	PRY Air.	Album
"No Sacrifice, No Victory"	2007	1	7	Transformers: The Score (Soundtrack)

== Filmography ==
=== Film ===
Year	Film	Director	Additional music	Studio / developer	Notes
1998	Border to Border	Thomas Whelan	—N/a	Stage 15 Productions	—N/a
2003	The Texas Chainsaw Massacre	Marcus Nispel	Jay Flood	New Line Cinema	—N/a
2004	Steamboy	Katsuhiro Otomo	—N/a	Sony Pictures Entertainment	—N/a
2005	The Amityville Horror	Andrew Douglas	James Dooley; Clay Duncan; Jay Flood	Metro-Goldwyn-Mayer	—N/a
2005	The Island	Michael Bay	Ramin Djawadi; Clay Duncan; Trevor Morris; Blake Neely	Warner Bros. Pictures	—N/a
2006	The Texas Chainsaw Massacre: The Beginning	Jonathan Liebesman	Jay Flood	New Line Cinema	—N/a
2007	The Hitcher	Dave Meyers	Clay Duncan; Jay Flood; Joel J. Richard; Pieter A. Schlosser	Rogue Pictures	Incidental music by Holeg Spies
2007	Transformers	Michael Bay	Lorne Balfe; Clay Duncan	Paramount Pictures; DreamWorks Pictures	—N/a
2007	D-War	Shim Hyung-rae	Jay Flood	Freestyle Releasing	—N/a
2009	Friday the 13th	Marcus Nispel	Clay Duncan; Jay Flood; Pieter A. Schlosser; Jed Smith	New Line Cinema; Paramount Pictures	—N/a
2009	Transformers: Revenge of the Fallen	Michael Bay	Ryeland Allison; Lorne Balfe; Clay Duncan; Jay Flood; Tom Gire; Linkin Park; Matthew Margeson; William J. Parker; John Sponsler; Hans Zimmer	Paramount Pictures; DreamWorks Pictures	Featuring original song by Linkin Park "New Divide"
2010	A Nightmare on Elm Street	Samuel Bayer	Jay Flood	Warner Bros. Pictures; New Line Cinema	Themes by Charles Bernstein
2011	Your Highness	David Gordon Green	—N/a	Universal Pictures	—N/a
2011	Transformers: Dark of the Moon	Michael Bay	Andrew Kawczynski; Jacob Shea	Paramount Pictures	—N/a
2012	Battleship	Peter Berg	Thom Russo; Jacob Shea; Tom Morello	Universal Pictures	—N/a
2013	Gangster Squad	Ruben Fleischer	—N/a	Warner Bros. Pictures	—N/a
2013	Pain & Gain	Michael Bay	Clay Duncan	Paramount Pictures	—N/a
2013	Ender's Game	Gavin Hood	Jacob Shea	Summit Entertainment	Orchestra conducted by Gavin Greenaway
2013	Lone Survivor	Peter Berg	Clay Duncan; Jacob Shea (Acoustic Guitar); Jon Jablonsky (Drums)	Universal Pictures	Composed with Explosions in the Sky
2014	Transformers: Age of Extinction	Michael Bay	Imagine Dragons; Dave Fleming; Jacob Shea; Joseph Trapanese; Michael Yezerski; Hans Zimmer	Paramount Pictures	Featuring original song By Imagine Dragons "Battle Cry"
2015	The Last Witch Hunter	Breck Eisner	Gary Dworetsky	Lionsgate Films	Orchestra conducted by David Shipps and performed by Nashville Music Scoring Orchestra
2016	Keanu	Peter Atencio	Elgin Thrower Jr.	Warner Bros. Pictures	Composed with Nathan Whitehead
2016	Teenage Mutant Ninja Turtles: Out of the Shadows	Dave Green	Gary Dworetsty; David Fleming; Jay Flood; Corey Jackson	Paramount Pictures; Nickelodeon Movies	Orchestra conducted by James Sale Replaced Brian Tyler
2016	Deepwater Horizon	Peter Berg	Jon Jablonsky (Drums)	Summit Entertainment	Featuring original song by Gary Clark Jr.
2017	Transformers: The Last Knight	Michael Bay	Gary Dworetsky; David Fleming; Luke Richards	Paramount Pictures	Orchestra conducted by Nick Glennie-Smith & James Sale
2018	Game Over, Man!	Kyle Newacheck	Christian Wibe	Netflix	—N/a
2018	Skyscraper	Rawson Marshall Thurber	Jon Jablonsky (Drums); Bryce Jacobs; Christian Wibe; Luke Richards	Universal Pictures; Legendary Entertainment	Featuring original song by Jamie N Commons "Walls"
2018	Morning Express II	Randall Miller	—N/a	Mediacorp Onetree Pictures mm2 Entertainment	—N/a
2020	Spenser Confidential	Peter Berg	Jared Fly	Netflix	—N/a
2020	Bloodshot	David S. F. Wilson	Sven Faulconer; Christian Wibe	Columbia Pictures	Orchestra conducted by Nick Glennie-Smith
2021	Red Notice	Rawson Marshall Thurber	Sven Faulconer; Jared Fly; Roger Suen	Netflix	Orchestra conducted by Jasper Randall
2022	DC League of Super-Pets	Jared Stern	—N/a	Warner Bros. Pictures	Replaced Dominic Lewis
2024	The Tiger's Apprentice	Raman Hui	Elisa Alloway; Freddy Avis; Sophia Blake	Paramount+	—N/a
2024	Borderlands	Eli Roth	—N/a	Lionsgate Films	Replaced Nathan Barr
2025	Motor City	Potsy Ponciroli	—N/a	Independent Film Company	—N/a

==== Additional music credits ====
Year	Film	Director	Additional music	Studio / developer	Notes
1997	Smilla's Sense of Snow	Bille August	Nick Glennie-Smith; Steve Jablonsky; Hans Zimmer	Fox Searchlight Pictures	Score composed by Harry Gregson-Williams and Hans Zimmer
1997	Deceiver	Jonas Pate; Josh Pate	—N/a	Metro-Goldwyn-Mayer	Score composed by Harry Gregson-Williams
1998	Armageddon	Michael Bay	Harry Gregson-Williams; Steve Jablonsky; Will Kaplan; John Van Tongeren	Touchstone Pictures	Score composed by Trevor Rabin
1998	Antz	Eric Darnell; Tim Johnson	Gavin Greenaway; Steve Jablonsky; Geoff Zanelli	DreamWorks Pictures	Score composed by Harry Gregson-Williams and John Powell
1999	Light It Up	Craig Bolotin	P.J. Hanke; Steve Jablonsky	20th Century Fox	Score composed by Harry Gregson-Williams
1999	Deep Blue Sea	Renny Harlin	Tim Heintz; Steve Jablonsky; Paul Linford	Warner Bros. Pictures	Score composed by Trevor Rabin
2000	The Tigger Movie	Jun Falkenstein	Klaus Badelt; Steve Jablonsky	Walt Disney Pictures	Score composed by Harry Gregson-Williams
2000	The Magic of Marciano	Tony Barbieri	—N/a	Cape Atlantic Productions	Score composed by Harry Gregson-Williams
2000	Chicken Run	Peter Lord; Nick Park	James McKee Smith; Geoff Zanelli; Gavin Greenaway; Steve Jablonsky	DreamWorks Pictures	Score composed by John Powell and Harry Gregson-Williams
2001	Pearl Harbor	Michael Bay	Klaus Badelt; Steve Jablonsky; James S. Levine; Fiachra Trench; Geoff Zanelli; Martin Tillman; Christopher Ward	Touchstone Pictures	Score composed by Hans Zimmer
2002	Spirit: Stallion of the Cimarron	Kelly Asbury; Lorna Cook	Steve Jablonsky; Mel Wesson; Gavin Greenaway	DreamWorks Pictures	Score composed by Bryan Adams and Hans Zimmer
2003	Tears of the Sun	Antoine Fuqua	James Dooley; Steve Jablonsky; Bruce Fowler; Martin Tillman	Columbia Pictures	Score composed by Hans Zimmer and Lisa Gerrard
2003	Pirates of the Caribbean: The Curse of the Black Pearl	Gore Verbinski	Ramin Djawadi; James Dooley; Nick Glennie-Smith; Steve Jablonsky; James McKee Smith; Blake Neely; Geoff Zanelli; Trevor Morris	Walt Disney Pictures	Score composed by Klaus Badelt and Hans Zimmer
2003	Bad Boys II	Michael Bay	Toby Chu; Tony Dofat; Dr. Dre; Steve Jablonsky; Paul Linford; Trevor Morris	Columbia Pictures	Score composed by Trevor Rabin
2019	6 Underground	Michael Bay	Steve Jablonsky	Netflix	Score composed by Lorne Balfe
2023	Transformers: Rise of the Beasts	Steven Caple Jr	Steve Jablonsky	Paramount Pictures	Also score producer and consultant Score composed by Jongnic Bontemps

=== Television ===
Year	Title	Network	Notes
1999	Swing Vote	ABC	Television film Additional music only Score composed by Harry Gregson-Williams
2002	AFP: American Fighter Pilot	CBS	—N/a
2002	Live from Baghdad	HBO	Television film
2002	National Geographic Explorer	National Geographic Channel	Episode: "Lost Subs: Disaster at Sea"
2003	Seven Wonders of the Industrial World	BBC	7 episodes
2003	Threat Matrix	ABC	3 episodes
2004–2012	Desperate Housewives	ABC	157 episodes
2005	The Contender	NBC	—N/a
2005	Threshold	CBS	—N/a
2006	Him and Us	—N/a	Television film
2008	Amas de Casa Desesperadas	Univision	24 episodes
2009	WWII in HD	History	Only composed "Trailblazing"
2011	Vietnam in HD	History	Only composed "Trailblazing"
2013	The List	—N/a	Television film
2013	Occult	A&E	Television film
2014	The Last Ship	TNT	Season 1
2015	You, Me and the Apocalypse	NBC	10 episodes
2021	Why Women Kill	Paramount+	10 episodes

=== Video games ===
Year	Title	Publisher	Notes
2001	Metal Gear Solid 2: Sons of Liberty	Konami	Additional music only Music composed by Harry Gregson-Williams and Norihiko Hibino; E3 Best Original Score
2007	Command & Conquer 3: Tiberium Wars	Electronic Arts	Composed with Trevor Morris
2007	Transformers: The Game	Activision	Composed with Jonathan Flood, David Whittaker and Adam Hay
2008	Gears of War 2	Microsoft Game Studios	—N/a
2009	The Sims 3	Electronic Arts	Composed CAS, Map View, Buy and Build mode music
2009	Transformers: Revenge of the Fallen	Activision	Additional music by Julien-K and Bobby Tahouri
2010	Prince of Persia: The Forgotten Sands	Ubisoft	Main Title, Cinematics and Front Music; PlayStation 3, Windows, Xbox 360 versions
2011	Gears of War 3	Microsoft Game Studios	—N/a
2013	Gears of War: Judgment	Microsoft Game Studios	Composed with Jacob Shea
2014	Transformers: Rise of the Dark Spark	Activision	Composed with Jeff Broadbent, Bobby Tahouri and Troels Brun Folmann
