= List of Transformers video games =

This is a list of video games based on the Transformers television series and movies, or featuring any of the characters.

Transformers games have been released for the ZX Spectrum, Commodore 64, Family Computer, Family Computer Disk System, Microsoft Windows, Mac OS, PlayStation, Game Boy Color, Nintendo 64, PlayStation 2, Mobile, iOS, Android, webOS, BlackBerry OS, and Virtual Console. Hasbro sold the digital gaming rights of various properties, including My Little Pony, Magic: The Gathering, Tonka, Playskool, and The Transformers, to Infogrames for $100 million USD in 2000, and then it bought back the rights for $65 million USD in June 2005.

== Titles ==
=== Based on The Transformers ===
Game	Details
The Transformers Original release dates: 1985	Release years by system: 1985 - ZX Spectrum, Commodore 64
The Transformers Original release dates: 1985	Notes: Developed by Denton Designs, released by Ocean Software
Transformers: The Battle to Save the Earth Original release dates: 1986	Release years by system: 1986 - Commodore 64
Transformers: The Battle to Save the Earth Original release dates: 1986	Notes: Produced by Activision
The Transformers: Mystery of Convoy Original release dates: JP: December 5, 1986	Release years by system: 1986 - Famicom; 2008 - Virtual Console
The Transformers: Mystery of Convoy Original release dates: JP: December 5, 1986	Notes: Japan-exclusive game; Developed by ISCO, published by Takara
Transformers: The Headmasters Original release dates: JP: August 28, 1987	Release years by system: 1987 - Famicom Disk System
Transformers: The Headmasters Original release dates: JP: August 28, 1987	Notes: Japan-exclusive game; Produced by Takara
Transformers (2003) Original release dates: JP: October 30, 2003	Release years by system: 2003 - PlayStation 2
Transformers (2003) Original release dates: JP: October 30, 2003	Notes: Japan-exclusive game; Developed by Winkysoft, published by Takara
Transformers G1: Awakening Original release dates: November 12, 2008	Release years by system: 2008 - Mobile phone 2010 - iOS
Transformers G1: Awakening Original release dates: November 12, 2008	Notes: Mobile phone game, produced by Glu Mobile
Transformers: Devastation Original release dates: October 6, 2015	Release years by system: 2015 - Microsoft Windows, PlayStation 3, PlayStation 4, Xbox 360, Xbox One
Transformers: Devastation Original release dates: October 6, 2015	Notes: Developed by PlatinumGames; Final game to be published by Activision

=== Based on Beast Wars: Transformers ===
Game	Details
Beast Wars: Transformers Original release dates: NA: December 5, 1997; EU: 1998	Release years by system: 1997 - PlayStation; 1998 - PC, Mac
Beast Wars: Transformers Original release dates: NA: December 5, 1997; EU: 1998	Notes: Published by Hasbro Interactive; Developed by SCE Studio Cambridge.
Kettō Transformers Beast Wars: Beast Senshi Saikyō Ketteisen Original release dates: JP: April 2, 1999	Release years by system: 1999 - Game Boy Color
Kettō Transformers Beast Wars: Beast Senshi Saikyō Ketteisen Original release dates: JP: April 2, 1999	Notes: Japan-exclusive game; Published by Takara; Developed by Gaibrain.; A 2D fighting game influenced by the Fatal Fury series, with similar elements such as basic and special attacks, and characters represented by 2D sprites. Characters can transform between Beast and Robot modes at will, with each mode having different moves. Supports multiplayer for two players.; Playable roster includes characters from Beast Wars, Beast Wars II, and Beast Wars Neo.; Extra mini games are unlockable through passwords.; Features support for the Game Link Cable, Super Game Boy, Game Boy Printer, and Transfer Pak.
Transformers: Beast Wars Transmetals Original release dates: JP: October 1, 1999; NA: July 12, 2000	Release years by system: 1999 - PlayStation, Nintendo 64
Transformers: Beast Wars Transmetals Original release dates: JP: October 1, 1999; NA: July 12, 2000	Notes: Published by Takara in Japan, BAM! Entertainment in North America; PS1 version developed by WAVEDGE, N64 version developed by Locomotive.

=== Games based on the film series ===
Game	Details
Transformers: The Game Original release dates: NA: June 19, 2007 (PSP); NA: June 26, 2007 (Consoles); EU: July 20, 2007	Release years by system: 2007 - PlayStation 2, Xbox 360, PlayStation 3, PlayStation Portable, Microsoft Windows, Wii
Transformers: The Game Original release dates: NA: June 19, 2007 (PSP); NA: June 26, 2007 (Consoles); EU: July 20, 2007	Notes: Adaptation of Transformers; Console versions developed by Traveller's Tales, PlayStation Portable version by Savage Entertainment; published by Activision; Xbox 360 version had special edition entitled Transformers: The Game Cybertron Edition, exclusively sold at GameStop and EB Games
Transformers Autobots / Transformers Decepticons Original release dates: NA: June 19, 2007	Release years by system: 2007 - Nintendo DS
Transformers Autobots / Transformers Decepticons Original release dates: NA: June 19, 2007	Notes: Transformers Autobots follows the plot of the movie and focuses on the Autobots; Transformers Decepticons has an alternate storyline and focuses on the Decepticons; Developed by Vicarious Visions, published by Activision
Transformers: The Game Original release dates: NA: June 2007	Release years by system: 2007 - Mobile phone
Transformers: The Game Original release dates: NA: June 2007	Notes: Sidescrolling platform game adaptation of Transformers, by Glu Mobile; Due to the fractured handset market in 2007 (before the dominance of smartphone OSs), the game required Glu to produce 20,000 individual versions for specific matchings of handsets and languages.
Transformers: Revenge of the Fallen Original release dates: NA: June 23, 2009; AU: June 24, 2009; EU: June 26, 2009	Release years by system: 2009 - Windows, PlayStation 2, PlayStation 3, PlayStation Portable, Wii, Xbox 360
Transformers: Revenge of the Fallen Original release dates: NA: June 23, 2009; AU: June 24, 2009; EU: June 26, 2009	Notes: Adaptation of Transformers: Revenge of the Fallen; PlayStation 3 and Xbox 360 versions developed by Luxoflux, Windows version by Beenox, PlayStation 2 and Wii by Krome Studios, and PlayStation Portable by Savage Entertainment; published by Activision
Transformers Revenge of the Fallen: Autobots Transformers Revenge of the Fallen: Decepticons Original release dates: NA: June 23, 2009	Release years by system: 2009 - Nintendo DS
Transformers Revenge of the Fallen: Autobots Transformers Revenge of the Fallen: Decepticons Original release dates: NA: June 23, 2009	Notes: Transformers Revenge of the Fallen: Autobots follows the plot of the movie and focuses on the Autobots.; Transformers Revenge of the Fallen: Decepticons has an alternate storyline and focuses on the Decepticons; Developed by Vicarious Visions, published by Activision
Transformers: Revenge of the Fallen Original release dates: NA: June 2009	Release years by system: 2009 - Mobile phone
Transformers: Revenge of the Fallen Original release dates: NA: June 2009	Notes: Sidescrolling platform game adaptation of Revenge of the Fallen, by Glu Mobile
Transformers: Dark of the Moon Original release dates: NA: June 14, 2011; AU: June 29, 2011; EU: June 24, 2011	Release years by system: 2011 - PlayStation 3, Xbox 360
Transformers: Dark of the Moon Original release dates: NA: June 14, 2011; AU: June 29, 2011; EU: June 24, 2011	Notes: Adaptation of Transformers: Dark of the Moon; PlayStation 3 and Xbox 360 versions developed by High Moon Studios, published by Activision
Transformers Dark of the Moon: Autobots Transformers Dark of the Moon: Decepticons Original release dates: NA: June 14, 2011; AU: June 29, 2011; EU: June 24, 2011	Release years by system: 2011 - Nintendo DS
Transformers Dark of the Moon: Autobots Transformers Dark of the Moon: Decepticons Original release dates: NA: June 14, 2011; AU: June 29, 2011; EU: June 24, 2011	Notes: Transformers Dark of the Moon: Autobots/Decepticons serves as a prequel to the film, with both versions following the same plot.; Developed by Behaviour Interactive, published by Activision
Transformers Dark of the Moon: Stealth Force Edition Original release dates: NA: June 14, 2011; AU: June 29, 2011; EU: June 24, 2011	Release years by system: 2011 - Nintendo 3DS and Wii
Transformers Dark of the Moon: Stealth Force Edition Original release dates: NA: June 14, 2011; AU: June 29, 2011; EU: June 24, 2011	Notes: Transformers: Dark of the Moon Stealth Force Edition is the only Transformers game in which players cannot control/play as robot mode; Developed by Behaviour Interactive, published by Activision
Transformers: Dark of the Moon Original release dates: NA: June 14, 2011; AU: June 29, 2011; EU: June 24, 2011	Release years by system: 2011 - iOS (iPhone, iPod Touch, iPad)
Transformers: Dark of the Moon Original release dates: NA: June 14, 2011; AU: June 29, 2011; EU: June 24, 2011	Notes: Strategy-based platform game adaptation of Dark of the Moon, by Electronic Arts
Transformers: Dark of the Moon Original release dates: NA: June 14, 2011; AU: June 29, 2011; EU: June 24, 2011	Release years by system: 2011 - Mobile phone
Transformers: Dark of the Moon Original release dates: NA: June 14, 2011; AU: June 29, 2011; EU: June 24, 2011	Notes: Side-scrolling platform game adaptation of Dark of the Moon, by Electronic Arts
Transformers: Human Alliance Original release date: NA: 2013	Release years by system: 2013 - Arcade
Transformers: Human Alliance Original release date: NA: 2013	Notes: Rail shooter using positional light guns, by Sega
CR Pachinko Transformers (CRぱちんこトランスフォーマー) Original release date: JP: May, 2015	Release years by system: 2015 - Pachinko arcade
CR Pachinko Transformers (CRぱちんこトランスフォーマー) Original release date: JP: May, 2015	Notes: An arcade pachinko game was released only in Japan, by Kyoraku.
Transformers: Shadows Rising Original release date: NA: 2018; JP: April 16, 2020	Release years by system: 2018 - Arcade
Transformers: Shadows Rising Original release date: NA: 2018; JP: April 16, 2020	Notes: Rail shooter using positional light guns, by Sega

=== Games based on Transformers: Animated ===
Game	Details
Transformers Animated: The Game Original release dates: NA: October 21, 2008; EU: October 24, 2008; AU: November 26, 2008	Release years by system: 2008 - Nintendo DS
Transformers Animated: The Game Original release dates: NA: October 21, 2008; EU: October 24, 2008; AU: November 26, 2008	Notes: Developed by A2M, published by Activision
Transformers Animated: The Chase Original release date: JP: 2010	Release years by system: 2010 - Arcade
Transformers Animated: The Chase Original release date: JP: 2010	Notes: Developed and published by Sega; Takes advantage of the cards included in the Japanese release of the Transformers: Animated toy line.
Transformers Animated: The Shooting Original release date: JP: 2010	Release years by system: 2010 - Arcade
Transformers Animated: The Shooting Original release date: JP: 2010	Notes: Developed and published by Sega; Takes advantage of the cards included in the Japanese release of the Transformers: Animated toy line.

=== Games based on Transformers: Prime ===
Game	Details
Transformers: Prime – The Game Original release dates: NA: October 30, 2012	Release years by system: 2012 - Nintendo DS, Nintendo 3DS, Wii, Wii U
Transformers: Prime – The Game Original release dates: NA: October 30, 2012	Notes: Developed by Nowpro, published by Activision
Transformers Universe Proposed release date: 2013	Proposed system release: 2014 - Microsoft Windows
Transformers Universe Proposed release date: 2013	Notes: A multiplayer online battle arena (MOBA) developed by British game developer Jagex in partnership with American toy company Hasbro. The game was officially unveiled at Auto Assembly 2010, the game went into closed beta on March 12, 2014 and entered open beta on July 4, 2014. The game shut down on January 31, 2015.

=== War for Cybertron series ===
Game	Details
Transformers: War for Cybertron Original release dates: NA: June 22, 2010; EU: June 25, 2010	Release years by system: 2010 - Microsoft Windows, PlayStation 3, Xbox 360
Transformers: War for Cybertron Original release dates: NA: June 22, 2010; EU: June 25, 2010	Notes: Third-person shooter; Developed by High Moon Studios, published by Activision
Transformers: Cybertron Adventures Original release dates: NA: June 22, 2010; PAL: June 25, 2010	Release years by system: 2010 - Wii
Transformers: Cybertron Adventures Original release dates: NA: June 22, 2010; PAL: June 25, 2010	Notes: Rail shooter; Developed by Next Level Games, published by Activision
Transformers: War for Cybertron Autobots Transformers: War for Cybertron Decepticons Original release dates: NA: June 22, 2010; PAL: June 25, 2010	Release years by system: 2010 - Nintendo DS
Transformers: War for Cybertron Autobots Transformers: War for Cybertron Decepticons Original release dates: NA: June 22, 2010; PAL: June 25, 2010	Notes: Separate games focusing on each faction; Developed by Vicarious Visions, published by Activision
Transformers: Fall of Cybertron Original release dates: NA: August 21, 2012; EU: August 24, 2012	Release years by system: 2012 - Microsoft Windows, PlayStation 3, Xbox 360, PlayStation 4, Xbox One
Transformers: Fall of Cybertron Original release dates: NA: August 21, 2012; EU: August 24, 2012	Notes: Third-person shooter; Developed by High Moon Studios, published by Activision
Transformers: Rise of the Dark Spark Original release date: NA: June 24, 2014	Release years by system: 2014 - Microsoft Windows, PlayStation 3, PlayStation 4, Wii U, Xbox 360, Xbox One
Transformers: Rise of the Dark Spark Original release date: NA: June 24, 2014	Notes: Third-person shooter; Developed by Edge of Reality, published by Activision
Transformers: Rise of the Dark Spark Original release date: NA: June 24, 2014	Release years by system: 2014 - Nintendo 3DS
Transformers: Rise of the Dark Spark Original release date: NA: June 24, 2014	Notes: Turn-based strategy; Developed by WayForward, published by Activision

=== Other games ===
Game	Details
Transformers Cancellation date: 1995	Proposed system release:
Transformers Cancellation date: 1995	Notes: This game was originally planned to be released for the SNES and utilize the Super FX chip. In 1994 Takara announced that this version was cancelled, and that the game would be released in 1995 for the Nintendo 64 (then intended for a 1995 launch), either the Sega 32X or Sega Saturn, and possibly the PlayStation.
DreamMix TV World Fighters Original release dates: JP: December 18, 2003	Release years by system: 2003 - GameCube, PlayStation 2
DreamMix TV World Fighters Original release dates: JP: December 18, 2003	Notes: Japan-exclusive fighting game, features Optimus Prime and Megatron as playable characters; Developed by Bitstep, published by Hudson Soft
Transformers Original release dates: PAL: May 7, 2004; NA: May 11, 2004	Release years by system: 2004 - PlayStation 2
Transformers Original release dates: PAL: May 7, 2004; NA: May 11, 2004	Notes: Developed by Atari Melbourne House, published by Atari; Based on Transformers: Armada
Angry Birds Transformers Original release date: WW: October 15, 2014	Release years by system: 2014 - iOS, Android
Angry Birds Transformers Original release date: WW: October 15, 2014	Notes: A run and gun game that serves as a crossover with the Angry Birds series.; Developed by Rovio Entertainment and Exient Entertainment, published by Rovio Entertainment.
Transformers: Earth Wars Original release date: WW: June 2, 2016	Release years by system: 2016 - iOS, Android
Transformers: Earth Wars Original release date: WW: June 2, 2016	Notes: A Clash of Clans clone with Transformers.; Developed by Space Ape Games and Backflip Studios. It was released on June 2, 2016 for iOS and Android.
Transformers: Forged to Fight Original release date(s): April 17, 2017	Release years by system: 2017 - iOS, Android
Transformers: Forged to Fight Original release date(s): April 17, 2017	Notes: Fighting game developed and published by Kabam.; Shut down on January 13, 2023.; Re-released on May 10, 2023 as a Netflix exclusive game; removing all microtransactions and in-game advertisements.
Transformers Online Cancellation date: 2020	Proposed system release:
Transformers Online Cancellation date: 2020	Notes: A massively multiplayer online game which was under development by Netdragon. Beta testing started in August 2011 and the game launched in March 2012. A new Transformers Online game by Tencent Games was launched in 2017, but similarly shut down on February 13, 2020.
Transformers: Battlegrounds Original release date: October 23, 2020	Release years by system: 2020 - Microsoft Windows, Nintendo Switch, PlayStation 4, Xbox One; 2021 - Google Stadia
Transformers: Battlegrounds Original release date: October 23, 2020	Notes: Tactical role-playing game based on Transformers: Cyberverse; Developed by Coatsink, published by Outright Games
Transformers: Heavy Metal Cancellation date: 2022	Proposed system release:
Transformers: Heavy Metal Cancellation date: 2022	Notes: A location-based augmented reality game developed by Niantic and Very Very Spaceship. Development of the game was cancelled in June 2022.
Transformers: The Universes Beyond Bundle Original release date(s):	Release years by system: 2022 - Magic: The Gathering Online
Transformers: The Universes Beyond Bundle Original release date(s):	Notes: A card bundle containing 15 double-faced cards, featuring characters from Transformers. The cards are "legal" in Magic: The Gathering's Legacy, Vintage, and Commander formats.
Transformers: Earthspark — Expedition Original release date: October 13, 2023	Release years by system: 2023 - Microsoft Windows, Nintendo Switch, PlayStation 4, PlayStation 5, Xbox One, Xbox Series X/S
Transformers: Earthspark — Expedition Original release date: October 13, 2023	Notes: Third-person shooter based on Transformers: EarthSpark; Developed by Tessera Studios, published by Outright Games
Transformers: Galactic Trials Original release date: October 11, 2024	Release years by system: 2024 - Microsoft Windows, Nintendo Switch, PlayStation 4, PlayStation 5, Xbox One, Xbox Series X/S
Transformers: Galactic Trials Original release date: October 11, 2024	Notes: Arcade Racing and Combat; Developed by 3DClouds S.r.l., published by Outright Games
Transformers: Reactivate Cancellation date: 2025	Proposed system release: Microsoft Windows, consoles
Transformers: Reactivate Cancellation date: 2025	Notes: An online action game developed by Splash Damage. A closed beta was planned for 2024, though this failed to surface and the game was cancelled in January 2025.
