= Transformers Revenge of the Fallen: Autobots and Decepticons =

2009 video game

Transformers Revenge of the Fallen: Autobots Transformers Revenge of the Fallen: Decepticons
- Cover art for the Autobots version
- Developer: Vicarious Visions
- Publisher: Activision
- Composer: Jeff Rona
- Series: Transformers
- Platform: Nintendo DS
- Release: NA: June 23, 2009; AU: June 24, 2009; EU: June 26, 2009
- Genre: Action-adventure
- Modes: Single-player, multiplayer

Transformers Revenge of the Fallen: Autobots and Transformers Revenge of the Fallen: Decepticons are action-adventure video games based on the 2009 live action film Transformers: Revenge of the Fallen. They are the Nintendo DS port of Transformers: Revenge of the Fallen, but follows a different storyline. It was developed by Vicarious Visions and published by Activision. The two game share some basic similarities, but overall feature different characters, missions and locations. They received mixed reviews upon release.

== Gameplay ==
As with Transformers: The Game, the DS version of Revenge of the Fallen splits the Autobot and Decepticon campaigns into two different games. The two games feature 25 missions in total, and the ability to battle friends via the handheld's Nintendo Wi-Fi Connection. Similar to Transformers Autobots, players must customize their own Transformer, known as "Create-A-Bot", who can be furthered customized during the game using parts found in missions. The difference between this game and its predecessors is that while scanning a vehicle to choose an alternate form, players are limited to "light" vehicles, which are fast but weak, "medium" vehicles, which are fast and strong, and "heavy" vehicles, which are strong but slow, and the protoform can't scan another vehicle once one has been already chosen. Another addition is that multiple weapons, armor and upgrades can be found throughout the game.

== Synopsis ==
=== Characters ===
Similar to the first set of Transformers games for the DS, the player gets to create their own character which they play as throughout the campaign. Many of the main Transformers from the movie appear throughout the story to aid the player, and several are available to play as in challenges. The Autobots version of the game features Optimus Prime, Jetfire, Bumblebee, Ratchet, Ironhide, Sideswipe, and Breakaway. The Decepticons version include *The Fallen, Megatron, Starscream, Soundwave, Grindor, Sideways, Barricade, and Devastator

=== Plot of Autobots ===
During a mission in Brazil, Optimus Prime spots Create-A-Bot crashing on Earth. After defending him from Decepticon forces led by Starscream, Optimus sends Create-A-Bot to meet with Ratchet, who has him scan one of three vehicles to use as an alternate form, and teaches him how to drive, before having him work with Ironhide and Bumblebee to destroy several Decepticon drones in the area, including the Create-A-Bot from Transformers Revenge of the Fallen: Decepticons. Afterwards, Ratchet has Create-A-Bot transferred to one of the Autobot bases and assigns him his first mission in Eastern Europe: to help scan several NEST data vehicles to prevent the Decepticons from locating an AllSpark shard. He is then transferred to England, where he is ordered to destroy several turrets and the Decepticons guarding them, as well as disarm a bomb.

Meanwhile, Breakaway and Bumblebee help NEST defend their base and factory located on an oil rig in the Atlantic Ocean from a Decepticon attack. After Bumblebee fails to shut down the factory, he is rescued by Breakaway before it explodes. In Rome, Italy, Create-A-Bot helps NEST defend against Decepticon forces, ultimately fighting and defeating Grindor. Afterwards, he travels to Siberia to rescue several NEST troops taken as hostages by the Decepticon Sideways, before being transferred to another part of Asia to help place some supplies into an aircraft before the Decepticons can steal them. Create-A-Bot is next sent to Japan to defend Ironhide while he activates several generators in order to fend off an incoming Decepticon attack, before also going to Shanghai to stop the Decepticons from blowing the place up using bombs. After disarming the bombs, he is attacked by Sideways, whom he pursues and ultimately defeats.

Create-A-Bot later goes to Mexico to protect a communication transport from the Decepticons until the communications are re-established and backup arrives. He also travels to Canada to assist an Autobot in destroying several generators before the entire area is destroyed, and to Area 51, which he defends from a Decepticon attack. Once he is transferred to New York City, USA, Create-A-Bot is ordered to scan Energon radiation hot spots, allowing Ratchet to triangulate the source's location. He then locates and defeats Starscream, in the process saving Jetfire, who reveals himself as an ancient Seeker, formerly serving The Fallen. He also tells Create-A-Bot about the Primes and how The Fallen, a former Prime, became the first Decepticon after betraying his brothers and built a Sun Harvester, which can only be activated by the Autobot Matrix of Leadership, and can absorb power from the Sun and transform into Energon, destroying the Sun and, therefore, all life on Earth in the process. Create-A-Bot then takes Jetfire back to the Autobot base so that he could share this information with them as well. During this time, the Decepticons manage to retrieve the body of their deceased leader Megatron from the Laurentian Abyss, and revive him using a shard of the AllSpark.

The Autobots later travel to Arabia to gather intel about information transmitted by the Decepticon Soundwave by scanning several satellite dishes, allowing them to hack into the Decepticons' communication for several seconds. The information reveals an upcoming attack on a NEST base in South Africa, so Create-A-Bot is sent there to thwart it and manages to protect several newly armored NEST vehicles from the Decepticons. He then goes to the Sahara to help the NEST troops defend their base there from Decepticons, before heading to Egypt to recover the Matrix of Leadership and prevent The Fallen from using it to activate his Sun Harvester and, therefore, doom Earth. Learning that a Decepticon stole the Matrix, Create-A-Bot pursues him, while the massive Decepticon Devastator is unleashed to uncovers the Harvester from within the pyramid. Create-A-Bot manages to re-activate a Space Bridge and is teleported to the final confrontation between Optimus, The Fallen, Megatron, and the Decepticon who stole the Matrix.

Optimus instructs Create-A-Bot to pursue Megatron and retrieve the Matrix, while he battles The Fallen. After overcoming several obstacles, including the Decepticon Scorponok, Create-A-Bot faces Megatron inside the pyramid where the Harvester is located and defeats him, recovering the Matrix and contacting Ratchet afterwards to inform him of the success of his mission. Ratchet then also patches Optimus through the transmission, who reveals that he has killed The Fallen with Jetfire's help and congratulates Create-A-Bot for his bravery, saying that he has earned his respect. Optimus then states that, even though The Fallen has been defeated, the Decepticons remain a threat and the Autobots' mission on Earth is far from over.

=== Plot ===
After being informed by Soundwave about Create-A-Bot crashing on Earth in Brazil, Starscream tracks him down and introduces himself as the Decepticon leader, persuading the newly arrived Transformer to join the Decepticons. They are then attacked by a group of Autobots, led by Optimus Prime, but manage to escape, and Create-A-Bot chooses one out of three human vehicles as his alternate form. After destroying several Autobots in the area, including the Create-A-Bot from Transformers Revenge of the Fallen: Autobots, the pair return to the Decepticon base, where Create-A-Bot receives his first task in Eastern Europe: to scan and then destroy several NEST data vehicles that contain Megatron's whereabouts, as well as to help track down an AllSpark shard. He is then transferred to England, where he is ordered to destroy several turrets and the Autobots guarding them, as well as disarm a bomb.

Meanwhile, Grindor and Starscream attack and destroy an oil rig off the coast of England in order to distract NEST and the Autobots, but Grindor takes fire from the oil rig's weaponry, prompting Starscream to pick him up and escape. In Rome, Italy, Create-A-Bot destroys the force fields guarding the NEST UAVs and destroys them with a bomb. He is confronted by the Autobot Bumblebee, who calls in a NEST air strike, but Create-A-Bot hacks into the UAVs and re-directs the bombs before defeating Bumblebee and escaping. Shortly after, Create-A-Bot travels to Siberia and infiltrates a military base, where he plants a tracking device on a helicopter that is on-route to the location of the AllSpark shard. While Soundwave tracks the helicopter, Create-A-Bot heads to a part of Asia to attack a NEST airbase before heading to Japan to destroy several generators in order to weaken the Autobots' defenses. Once he succeeds, he is informed by Soundwave that the shard has been moved to an aircraft carrier on the Indian Ocean. After retrieving it, Create-A-Bot heads to the Laurentian Abyss, where Megatron's body is kept deep underwater. Grindor lowers Create-A-Bot into the water, allowing him to retrieve Megatron's remains and then revive him using the shard. Megatron subsequently assumes command of the Decepticons once again, much to Starscream's frustration.

Megatron then becomes the servant of The Fallen, a former Prime and the first Decepticon, who seeks to harvest the power from the Sun and transform it into enough Energon for the Decepticons to finally destroy the Autobots, using his old Sun Harvester, which will also destroy the Sun and all life on Earth in the process. However, the Decepticons first need to help The Fallen and his forces arrive on Earth undetected, which they do after attacking an Autobot base in Mexico and destroying its satellite defense system. Create-A-Bot meanwhile travels to Canada to gain control of an Autobot refinery while also going to Area 51 to scan Decepticon technology and self-destruct the base by overloading the ballistic missile's controls. The Fallen then orders the Decepticons to retrieve the Autobot Matrix of Leadership, which he needs in order to activate the Sun Harvester. To find it, Create-A-Bot is sent to hunt down The Fallen's former servant Jetfire, but he is protected by Autobots aboard an aircraft carrier. Create-A-Bot manages to board the carrier, where he defeats the Autobot Ironhide, before confronting Jetfire. When he refuses to reveal the Matrix's whereabouts, Create-A-Bot rips Jetfire's spark out of his body, killing him and extracting the information he wanted.

The Decepticons later travel to a NEST base in Arabia to disable the base's satellite dishes, allowing Starscream to send Soundwave a message to attack a depot in South Africa. There, Create-A-Bot destroys several NEST hardware vehicles before they can fully operate the depot, before going to the Sahara to destroy another military base by activating the missile's self-destruct systems after NEST learned of the Decepticons' presence there.

Learning that the Matrix is in Egypt, the Decepticons travel there, and The Fallen unleashes the massive Decepticon Devastator to uncover the Sun Harvester from within a pyramid. Meanwhile, Create-A-Bot is sent to retrieve the Matrix, finding it in the possession of Optimus Prime. After defeating Optimus, he claims the Matrix and returns to The Fallen, informing him of his victory, much to both his and Megatron's surprise. The Fallen then has Create-A-Bot replace Megatron as leader of the Decepticons, much to Starscream's joy, and later announces that the harvesting of the Sun was a success, providing the Decepticons with tons of Energon and allowing them to create an army large enough to conquer the known universe. But before all this, Starscream warns Create-A-Bot that he will return to being leader of the Decepticons in the near future.

== Reception ==
Reception

Aggregate score
Aggregator	Score
Metacritic	(Autobots) 64/100 (Decepticons) 66/100

Review scores
Publication	Score
GamesRadar+	2.5/5
GameZone	7/10
IGN	7/10
Nintendo Power	7/10
Nintendo World Report	7/10

Both games received "mixed or average" reviews upon release, according to review aggregator Metacritic.

Nintendo Power gave the game 7 out of 10, stating, "This may be the first time in video game history that a licensed DS title far exceeds the movie it's based on." IGN gave the game a score of 7 out of 10, stating that it "represents Transformers well".
