= Transformers: Revenge of the Fallen (video game) =

2009 video game

- Developers: Luxoflux; Beenox (PC); Vicarious Visions (NDS); Krome Studios (PS2, Wii); Savage Entertainment (PSP)
- Publisher: Activision
- Director: Christoper A. Tremmel
- Writers: Adam Foshko; Paul Golding; Micah Wright
- Composer: Steve Jablonsky
- Engine: Lux Engine (PS3, X360, PC); Merkury (PS2, Wii)
- Platforms: Microsoft Windows; Nintendo DS; PlayStation 2 PlayStation 3 PlayStation Portable; Wii; Xbox 360
- Release: NA: June 23, 2009; AU: June 24, 2009; EU: June 26, 2009
- Genre: Third-person shooter
- Modes: Single-player, multiplayer

Transformers: Revenge of the Fallen is a third-person shooter video game based on the 2009 live action film Transformers: Revenge of the Fallen. It is the sequel to 2007's Transformers: The Game, and the second video game adaptation of the live-action Transformers film series. The PlayStation 3 and Xbox 360 versions of the game were developed by Luxoflux, and ported to Microsoft Windows by Beenox. The PlayStation 2 and Wii versions were developed by Krome Studios, and the PlayStation Portable version was developed by Savage Entertainment. All versions of the game were published by Activision, and released on June 23, 2009, in the United States. Australia received the games one day later, and Europe on June 26. A sequel, Transformers: Dark of the Moon, was released in June 2011, based on the film on the same name.

All versions of the game loosely follow the plot of the film they are based on. Following the death of their leader, Megatron, the Decepticons have gone into hiding on Earth, while the Autobots have formed an alliance with humanity to hunt them down. The Decepticons are secretly being aided by a new enemy, the Fallen, who seeks to activate an ancient machine that would provide them with enough Energon to defeat the Autobots, destroying the Sun and all life on Earth in the process. The PC, PlayStation 3, and Xbox 360 versions of the game feature a split-campaign format, with players choosing to join either the Autobots or the Decepticons, and completing various missions for whichever faction they chose. The PlayStation 2 and Wii versions combine the Autobot and Decepticon stories into one campaign that alternates between the two factions.

Transformers Revenge of the Fallen: Autobots and Transformers Revenge of the Fallen: Decepticons are the Nintendo DS versions of Revenge of the Fallen, developed by Vicarious Visions. Similar to Transformers Autobots and Transformers Decepticons, the DS version is split into two separate games, following either the Autobots' or the Decepticons' perspective.

Revenge of the Fallen received mixed reviews on the PlayStation 3 and Xbox 360 systems, with criticism directed towards its bland graphics and repetitive missions in story mode; although the online mode was praised, it received criticism for its connection problems. The PlayStation 2 and Wii scored lower, while the DS iterations fared slightly better.

== Gameplay ==
=== PC, PlayStation 3 and Xbox 360 ===
As with Transformers: The Game, Revenge of the Fallen features two separate campaigns; one depicting the actions of the Autobots, and the other the actions of the Decepticons. The game expands on the movie plot with additional missions and characters. Unlike its predecessor, Revenge of the Fallen features a hub-like, non-linear mission progression. This allows the player to choose what missions they would like to accomplish and where in order to further drive the story.

Multiplayer features five different modes. "Deathmatch" allows players to choose any character in a free-for-all battle. "Team Deathmatch" features Autobots vs Decepticons. "Control Points" features gameplay with teams battling for control of specific areas to gain points. "One Shall Stand" is similar to Team Deathmatch; the difference is that the objective is for a player to take out the enemy leader (Optimus Prime or Megatron) while protecting their own. The final mode, "Battle for the Shards", features Capture the Flag-style gameplay; teams search for shards of the AllSpark and return them to their base to earn points.

=== PlayStation 2 and Wii ===
The PlayStation 2 and Wii versions of the game combine third person shooter elements with brawlers. In this version, there is only one linear campaign, with factions changing between some levels. Their ability to transform into vehicles is absent, and is instead used as a power-up that instantly defeats all enemies around the player, and costs Energon, which is displayed in the HUD, underneath the health bar. Energon is earned from defeating enemies, and can also be used to restore health. There are also several unlockables, such as concept arts and character models, and a local co-op multiplayer mode, where two players have to survive against waves of enemies for as long as possible.

== Synopsis ==
=== Setting ===
Revenge of the Fallen is set a few years after the events of Transformers: The Game. The evil Decepticon leader Megatron has been killed, and the powerful AllSpark has been shattered into numerous fragments, scattered across the Earth, to prevent it from falling into the wrong hands. Despite Megatron's death however, numerous Decepticons are still active in various places around the world, forcing the heroic Autobots, led by Optimus Prime, to work with mankind to hunt them down. Unbeknownst to the Autobots, the Fallen, a former Prime and the first Decepticon, has returned, and is aiding the current Decepticons with their plans to resurrect Megatron and defeat the Autobots.

The PC, PlayStation 3, and Xbox 360 versions of the game feature two different campaigns, one from the Autobots' perspective and the other from the Decepticons', which cross over on several occasions, while the PlayStation 2 and Wii versions feature only one campaign, which alternates between the two factions.

=== Characters ===
Autobots	Playable						
Autobots	PC	360	PS3	PS2	Wii	PSP	NDS
Optimus Prime^{a}^{b}	Yes	Yes	Yes	Yes	Yes	Yes	Yes
Jetfire^{c}	No	Downloadable	Downloadable	Yes	Yes	No	No
Bumblebee^{d}	Yes	Yes	Yes	Yes	Yes	Yes	Yes
Ironhide^{b}	Yes	Yes	Yes	Yes	Yes	Yes	No
Ratchet^{d}	Yes	Yes	Yes	No	No	Yes	No
Breakaway	Yes	Yes	Yes	No	No	No	Yes
Sideswipe^{d}^{e}	No	Downloadable	Downloadable	No	No	Yes	Yes
Aerialbot^{e}	Multiplayer	Multiplayer	Multiplayer	No	No	No	No
Protectobots	Multiplayer	Multiplayer	Multiplayer	No	No	No	No
Jazz^{e}	No	Downloadable	Downloadable	No	No	No	No
Decepticons	Playable						
Decepticons	PC	360	PS3	PS2	Wii	PSP	NDS
Megatron^{a}^{b}	Yes	Yes	Yes	Yes	Yes	Yes	Yes
Barricade	No	No	No	No	No	No	Yes
Dead End	No	No	No	No	No	Yes	No
Starscream^{a}^{b}	Yes	Yes	Yes	Yes	Yes	Yes	Yes
Grindor^{f}	Yes	Yes	Yes	No	No	Yes	No
Long Haul^{b}	Yes	Yes	Yes	No	No	No	No
Soundwave^{e}	No	Downloadable	Downloadable	No	No	No	No
Seeker	Multiplayer	Multiplayer	Multiplayer	No	No	No	No
Sideways	Yes	Yes	Yes	Yes	Yes	Yes	Yes
Sunstorm^{a}^{e}	No	Downloadable	Downloadable	No	No	No	No

^aCharacter is available in their G1 design as downloadable content in campaign and multiplayer.
^bCharacter has an unlockable alternate livery.
^cCharacter is available in multiplayer only if the DLC was downloaded.
^dCharacter has alternate appearances if the DLC is brought.
^eCharacter is available in both campaign and multiplayer once the player downloaded the downloadable content in PS3 or Xbox 360.
^fGrindor looks identical to Blackout from Transformers: The Game, and they might be the same character.

=== Plot ===
==== PC, PlayStation 3 and Xbox 360 ====
===== Autobot campaign =====
The Autobots receive reports from NEST of Decepticon presence in Shanghai, China. Upon arrival, they are alerted to numerous Decepticons in the area and fight them, with Ironhide defeating the Decepticon Sideways, though he goes missing shortly thereafter. When Optimus Prime gets word of this, Ratchet is sent to investigate and eventually finds Ironhide, recharging him and escorting him to safety. Afterwards, the massive Decepticon Demolishor attacks, but Optimus defeats him; before dying, Demolishor states that "the Fallen shall rise again".

Ironhide battles Decepticon forces in Burbank, California.

The Autobots then head to Burbank, California where a previously unknown fragment of the AllSpark has surfaced in possession of Mikaela Banes. When the Decepticons detect the fragment, Bumblebee is sent to protect Mikaela. Meanwhile, the Decepticons discover Megatron's location in the Laurentian Abyss from Soundwave. Despite Breakaway being sent to defend the carrier fleet Deep-6 which guards Megatron's body, the Decepticons manage to retrieve Megatron's remains and then resurrect him using an AllSpark fragment they had stolen.

On the East Coast, Sam Witwicky is kidnapped by Decepticons and taken to an industrial park near his college. After Ratchet locates Sam, Bumblebee rescues him and defeats Grindor. Meanwhile, Optimus decides to give the humans a Cybertronian weapon called the Axiom Gun to help combat the growing Decepticon threat, and personally escorts the weapon to the NEST headquarters. The Autobots then take Sam to meet with former Agent Simmons, who knows the whereabouts of an old Transformer, the former Decepticon Jetfire. Bumblebee brings Sam to the museum where Jetfire is located, and must fend off several waves of Decepticons attacking them. Jetfire eventually awakens and takes Sam through the trans-dimensional Space Bridge to Cairo, Egypt.

Jetfire reveals that the Dynasty of Primes have constructed a machine called the Sun Harvester hidden in an Egyptian pyramid, which Jetfire claims that can destroy stars to harvest their power, converting it into Energon. The Autobots arrive on the outskirts of Cairo looking for Sam and Jetfire, and are attacked by the Decepticons, but manage to defeat them. After locating Sam, Optimus Prime takes him to the Tomb of the Ancients and defends him from Megatron and Starscream. While helping Optimus fight them, Jetfire is mortally wounded by Megatron. After the two Decepticons are defeated, Jetfire lends his wings and other parts to Optimus to help him stop the Fallen, who by this point has activated his Star Harvester. While Optimus confronts the Fallen, the other Autobots battle the remaining Decepticons, with Bumblebee defeating the massive Devastator. Eventually, Optimus kills the Fallen and sends his body falling into the Star Harvester, causing it to explode. With the Earth and Sun saved and the Ancient Transformers avenged, Optimus salutes his fellow Autobots for their courage. Ratchet then informs them that the surviving Decepticons, including Megatron, have left the Earth and are heading to a distant galaxy, but will likely return, meaning the war is not yet over.

===== Decepticon campaign =====
While searching for Megatron's lost body in Shanghai, Sideways encounters a group of Autobots and defeats them. He is then ordered to find and rescue Grindor, who has gone missing, and attack several NEST arrays, which he infects with a virus, giving the Decepticons access to NEST communications. Meanwhile, Long Haul destroys NEST bases around Shanghai, and encounters Ironhide, whom he defeats. Starscream, who is leading the Decepticons in Megatron's absence, proclaims that their victory in Shanghai will serve as a warning to Optimus Prime.

The Decepticons next head to Burbank, where Soundwave has learned that Sam Witwicky had given a shard of the AllSpark to Mikaela. Believing that the shard can be used to revive Megatron, Long Haul is sent to capture several humans, who are then interrogated by Starscream on Mikaela's whereabouts. After discovering Mikaela's location, Long Haul is sent to retrieve her. However, Starscream then receives word that the Decepticon troops transporting Mikaela have been intercepted by the Autobots. In the wake of defeat, Starscream decides to kidnap NSA Chief Galloway. After destroying several buildings owned by the front corporation Massive Dynamics, Starscream captures Galloway and places him under Decepticon control. Meanwhile, the Autobots send Breakaway to stop the Decepticons' activities in Burbank, but Grindor intercepts and defeats him.

The Decepticons learn from Galloway that another AllSpark shard is in NEST's custody and that Megatron is buried deep in the Laurentian Abyss. After Ravage retrieves the shard, the Decepticons travel to the Atlantic, where Starscream disables the Deep-6 aircraft carriers that guard Megatron's remains, allowing the Decepticons to retrieve their former leader's body. Megatron is then revived using the AllSpark shard, and the Decepticons return to the East Coast. There, Grindor kidnaps Sam, while Megatron defeats Optimus Prime. After Sam is rescued by the Autobots, the Decepticons learn he is headed to a museum, which Starscream destroys, though this fails to kill Sam, as he was transported to Cairo via a Space Bridge created by Jetfire.

The Decepticons follow the Autobots to the outskirts of Cairo, where Megatron fights and defeats both Jetfire and Bumblebee. Meanwhile, Long Haul destroys the Axion Gun that the Autobots gave to NEST. Megatron then learns that the Fallen has betrayed him by promising to make him a Prime, as Primes are born, not made, so he exacts revenge by killing him at his Star Harvester before he can activate it. Megatron later learns from Starscream that Optimus Prime has destroyed the Harvester, and declares victory for the Decepticons, making plans to form a new army and defeat the Autobots in the future.

==== PlayStation 2 and Wii ====
The PlayStation 2 and Wii versions of the game feature stylized graphics.

The Decepticon Soundwave hacks onto a satellite and finds a Cybertronian artifact on a NEST truck in Shanghai, China. Sideways and Demolishor intercept the truck and steal the artifact, drawing the Autobots into motion to stop them. While Ironhide battles and destroys Demolishor, Bumblebee pursues Sideways through the streets and across rooftops, but the latter ultimately escapes with Starscream's help. Returning to the Decepticon base, Starscream reports back to the new Decepticon leader, the Fallen, who seeks to reactivate his old Star Harvester to create enough Energon to defeat the Autobots, and reveals that the artifact they stole is an essential component of the machine. He then sends the Decepticons to the Laurentian Abyss to retrieve Megatron's body, which is being guarded by a fleet of navy ships. After Starscream destroys the ships, Sideways is sent to retrieve Megatron's body. He is successful, and the Decepticons return to the Fallen, who resurrects Megatron and makes him his servant.

Megatron unleashes the colossal Decepticon Devastator in Shanghai to retrieve another component of the Star Harvester, but he is defeated by Optimus, who secures the component and gives it to NEST for safeguarding. However, Bumblebee was captured by Starscream during the fight, and is used as bait to lure the Autobots to the Decepticon base, where Megatron intends to kill Optimus and obtain the final component of the Harvester - the Autobot Matrix of Leadership. While Megatron fights Optimus, Bumblebee escapes from his cell with the help of Jetfire, an old Decepticon and former servant of the Fallen who had also been imprisoned. Optimus is ultimately defeated by Megatron, who takes the Matrix from his body and leaves him to die. Before escaping, Bumblebee and Jetfire place the barely alive Optimus in an escape pod that takes him to Cairo, Egypt. Elsewhere, Megatron and Starscream attack a NEST base to retrieve the Star Harvester component Devastator failed to obtain.

Jetfire attempts to stop the Decepticons and pursues them to Egypt, where he is shot down by Megatron. Though wounded, he is able to make his way to Optimus and save him from Starscream, at the cost of his own life. Before dying, Jetfire lends his wings and other parts to Optimus, restoring his power and giving him the means to stop the Fallen. Reuniting with the other Autobots, Optimus tells them to deal with the Decepticons guarding the Star Harvester while he confronts the Fallen. Ironhide is able to destroy several Decepticon turrets before being attacked by Megatron. Optimus saves Ironhide and defeats Megatron, before battling the Fallen. He prevails once again, destroying both the Fallen and the Star Harvester. Their forces defeated, Megatron and Starscream try to make their escape, but get sucked into a Space Bridge, which transports them to the Fallen's base. The game ends with the Autobots repairing the pyramid where the Star Harvester was located, while Megatron and Starscream oversee the creation of a new Decepticon army.

== Development ==
Promotional poster for downloadable content, which features Generation 1 and film characters

PlayStation 3 and Xbox 360 developer Luxoflux updated the transformation system of the game to allow for more fluid transforming of the robots. Players can now transform in mid-air, carry over momentum gained prior to transforming, and transform directly into attacks. It features online play and downloadable content, announced on July 15, 2009. New features include the following: new multiplayer characters, including G1 versions of characters and new liveries; new multiplayer maps; the ability to use new characters in the campaign; an expert difficulty mode; and new achievements (Xbox 360) and trophies (PS3). It was released August 27, 2009 for the PS3 and Xbox 360.

The PS2 and Wii versions of the game were developed by Krome Studios. These versions feature a special cooperative mode, where the second player can "man the guns", utilizing a floating shield and weapon system, which is called the "Remote Weapons System" and is controlled with an on-screen reticule. Players work together to survive against waves of enemies.

The PSP version of Transformers was developed by Savage Entertainment. In this version, the game is played from a top-down perspective while in robot mode, with driving and escort levels also added. Ad-Hoc cooperative play is supported. Gameplay in robot form is reminiscent of the arcade shooter Smash TV and the Dreamcast title Cannon Spike.

=== Audio ===
Peter Cullen reprises his role as Optimus Prime, Mark Ryan returns to the game for voice acting. Despite not returning to voice Ironhide, he instead reprises his voice role as Bumblebee from the 2007 film . Jess Harnell replaces Mark Ryan as the voice of Ironhide, reprising his role from the first and second films. Robert Foxworth as Ratchet, and Charlie Adler voices Starscream in the game. Although Revenge of the Fallen retains most of the cast from its film counterpart, there are a few exceptions. The movie's titular villain, the Fallen, is voiced by James Arnold Taylor who replaces Tony Todd from the film. Peter Jessop replaces Frank Welker as the voice of Soundwave. Hugo Weaving, who voices Megatron in the live action films, does not voice Megatron in the game. Instead Frank Welker, who voiced Megatron in The Transformers animated series returns to voice the character. Devastator, who was voiced by Welker in the film, is voiced by Fred Tatasciore in the game. Tatasciore also voices Demolishor and Grindor. Clive Revill, who voices Kickback in The Transformers, voices Jetfire replacing Mark Ryan. The game features Neil Kaplan, the voice of Optimus Prime in the series Transformers: Robots in Disguise. Kaplan does not voice Prime, but instead voices the character Long Haul as well as additional minor characters. Electronic rock band Julien-K, who contributed one track to the first movie's soundtrack, provided the score with Steve Jablonsky. John DiMaggio, who later go on to voice Leadfoot in Dark of the Moon, voices Sideways and Maj. Lennox. Andrew Kishino, who originally voiced Jazz in Transformers: The Game, would voice an Autobot flyer who was cut from the film, Breakaway. Kishino also reprises as Jazz in the DLC, and Nolan North replaces André Sogliuzzo as the voice of Sideswipe in the DLC as well.

== Reception ==
Reception

Aggregate scores
Aggregator	Score
GameRankings	(PS3) 63.55% (X360) 63.46% (PC) 56% (Wii) 53% (PS2) 46% (PSP) 36.50%
Metacritic	(PS3) 63/100 (X360) 61/100 (PC) 58/100 (Wii) 53/100 (PS2) 51/100 (PSP) 37/100

Review scores
Publication	Score
Destructoid	4.5/10
Edge	4/10
Eurogamer	4/10
Game Informer	6.25/10 (Wii) 5/10
GamePro	4/5
GameSpot	7.5/10 (PC) 6/10 (Wii) 4.5/10 (PSP) 4/10
GameSpy	3.5/5
GameTrailers	6.3/10
GameZone	(PS3) 6.9/10 (X360) 6.7/10 (Wii) 5.5/10 (PS2) 5/10 (PSP) 4.5/10
Giant Bomb	3/5
IGN	6/10 (PS2 & Wii) 4.2/10 (PSP) 2.8/10
Nintendo Power	5.5/10
Official Xbox Magazine (US)	6/10
PC Gamer (US)	38%

Transformers: Revenge of the Fallen received mixed reviews from critics, with the Xbox 360 version of the game holding a 63.46% at GameRankings and 61 out of 100 at Metacritic. The PlayStation 3 version scored similarly, with a 63.55% at GameRankings and 63 out of 100 at Metacritic. The PC version scored slightly lower at 56% and 58 out of 100, respectively. IGN's Chris Roper gave the game 6 out of 10, saying that it had a "complete and utter lack [of presentation]". 1UP.com's Thierry Nguyen gave the PS3 and X360 versions a C+, saying "Transformers 2 is a significant improvement upon its terrible predecessor". GamePro was more forgiving, giving the game four stars out of five and stating "If you like Transformers, buy this game. Even if you don't (or you just hate Michael Bay), you should still give Optimus Prime a try." Eurogamer gave the Xbox 360 version 4 out of 10, stating "It's never much fun, but nor is it wonky enough to be terrible. It's simply there, a forgettable distraction." The PC port was cited as having a number of technical issues, causing lower scores than its console counterparts. GameSpot scored the PC version 6 out of 10, whereas the 360 and PS3 versions received 7.5 out of 10. GameSpy gave the X360 version three-and-a-half stars out of five, praising the professional voice work and "strong multiplayer gameplay". They further said that "the multiplayer mode [will] keep Revenge of the Fallen relevant long after the movie has gone to DVD".

The PS2 and Wii versions received mixed to negative reviews from critics, with the PS2 version of the game holding a 46% at GameRankings and a 51 out of 100 at Metacritic. The Wii version scored a bit higher, with a 53% at GameRankings and 53 out of 100 at Metacritic. The PS2 and Wii versions of Revenge of the Fallen were panned for having awful controls. Specifically, IGN stated that "the game will often ignore what you want to do, and instead does something different", giving the game 4.2 out of 10. GameZone panned the controls of the Wii version, saying that "control problems – among other missteps – ruined this game".

The PSP version received even worse reviews, earning a 36.50% at GameRankings and a 37 out of 100 at Metacritic. GameSpot's Chris Watters gave Revenge of the Fallen four out of 10, saying that "this dull and unpleasant action game is in desperate need of a tune-up". IGN rated the game 2.8, calling it "one of the worst games on the PSP". GameZone called the game "a considerably flawed game from start to finish".

At the 2009 Spike Video Game Awards, Megan Fox won the Best Performance By A Human Female award for her portrayal as Mikaela Banes in the game.
