= Transformers (2004 video game) =

Third-person shooter for the PlayStation 2

- North American cover art depicting Optimus Prime
- Developer: Atari Melbourne House
- Publisher: Atari
- Director: Andrew Carter
- Producers: Mark Coombes; Myles Abbott; Mark Morrison
- Designers: Andrew Symons; Phil Anderson
- Programmers: Adam Boyle; Trevor Powell; Dick Hunton
- Artists: Russel Comte; Holger Liebnitz
- Writer: Thuyen Nguyen
- Composer: Gavin Parker
- Series: Transformers
- Platform: PlayStation 2
- Release: EU: May 7, 2004; NA: May 11, 2004; AU: May 13, 2004
- Genre: Third-person shooter
- Mode: Single-player

Transformers is a video game based on the Transformers: Armada animated series. It was developed by Atari Melbourne House, published by Atari and released exclusively for the PlayStation 2 in 2004. Although non-canon to the series, the game follows a similar premise, depicting the Autobots and the Decepticons' search for Mini-Cons on Earth, whose combined powers will grant either faction victory in the war for their home planet, Cybertron. The game received generally positive reviews.

== Gameplay ==
Transformers is a third-person shooter game, where players assume the role of one of three Autobots: Optimus Prime, Red Alert or Hot Shot, who are all able to transform between robot and vehicle modes at the push of the triangle button. The game revolves around the collection of Mini-Cons, which can be equipped to the Autobot and provide various weapons and abilities. These include giving their blasters secondary weapons; support items, such as glider wings; and stat-enhancements, such as an armour boost. Up to four can be equipped at once, and with the exception of stat-enhancements, they can be activated using the shoulder buttons. The primary weapon will always be assigned to R1, and its default fire can be altered by assigning certain Mini-Cons to the button (such as charging and firing blasts by holding and subsequently releasing the button). There is a limit to what Mini-Cons can be equipped with respect to power limitation, with more powerful Mini-Cons requiring more power. The more of the same colour Mini-Cons equipped, the stronger one's character will be alongside an increase in health. This is referred to as "Mini-Con linking." For the most part, the Mini-Cons do not change the aesthetics of the transformer. The three Autobots have their own Mini-Con partners who, in addition to providing minor fire support, can "Powerlinx" with the player which strengthens the Autobot at the cost of gradually draining their health. Despite being based on the Armada series, classic G1 quotes are recited throughout the game, especially quotes from The Transformers: The Movie. Garry Chalk and David Kaye are the only voice actors from the series to be in this game, as their roles of Optimus Prime and Megatron, respectively.

== Plot ==
The game doesn't follow the already established storyline of the Armada series, but has a similar premise. Millions of years ago, Mini-Cons - miniature Transformers who can grant Cybertronians special powers if merged with them - fled Cybertron and crash-landed on Earth, where they went into stasis. In the present, the Autobots, led by Optimus Prime, and the Decepticons, led by Megatron, are engaged in a deadly war for control of Cybertron. The game's opening sequence shows Megatron launching a final assault on the Autobot Headquarters on Cybertron, alongside his Decepticlones, a large army of Decepticon drones. The Decepticlones soon overpower the Autobot resistance, as Megatron and Optimus engage in a one-on-one fight. Before the winner can be decided, a Mini-Con distress beacon activates on Earth. Well-aware of what this means, Megatron and his Decepticlone forces abandon the battle and head to Earth to find the Mini-Cons, believing their powers will guarantee the Decepticons' victory. Meanwhile, Optimus, Red Alert, and Hot Shot return to their headquarters, from where they operate a Space Bridge to travel to various locations across the planet and retrieve the Mini-Cons before the Decepticons can.

They first travel to the Amazon, where they retrieve several Mini-Cons and fight Decepticlone patrols. Eventually, the Autobots encounter Cyclonus at some ancient ruins, who dispatches a Decepticlone Heavy Unit to attack them. After destroying it and chasing Cyclonus away, the Autobots find the Mini-Cons Sparkplug, Jolt, and Longarm, who send out a call to the other Mini-Cons on Earth and join the Autobots in the search for their brethren. The Autobots next go to Antarctica, making their way past icy canyons, an open glacial area, and a crashed human plane and ice breaker in order to reach a research facility, where the Decepticons have already found more Mini-Cons. They defeat the Decepticlone guards and Starscream, before planning to return to the Amazon to stop Cyclonus. The Autobots depart, unaware that Starscream is still online.

Back at the Amazon, the Autobots fight their way through the jungle and then an ancient pyramid, where they defeat Cyclonus, causing him to crash and explode. Afterwards, the Autobots spot several Decepticlone Dropships heading to the Atlantic Ocean and follow them. There, they find a massive warship, and fight their way across multiple small islands, ultimately finding a Mini-Con who grants them the ability to glide. They use this to board the ship and make their way to its control room, learning it is headed to Alaska. The ship then transforms into robot mode revealing itself to be Tidal Wave, but the Autobots defeat him, sending him plunging into the ocean.

The Autobots travel to Alaska, believing it to be the location of Megatron's base on Earth, and make their way through the snowy mountains and a cave system, before Starscream attempts to crash a ship on purpose to stop them with the Autobots barely escaping. Fighting their way through the crashed ship, the Autobots confront Starscream on the bridge, but the scuffle causes the ship to fall off a cliff and into a valley down below. After making their way out of the ship, the Autobots defeat Starscream, who is then knocked out by Optimus. With Red Alert hacking into his warp transponder, they learn that Megatron's base is actually located on a volcanic island in the Pacific Ocean, so the Autobots head there next. They fight their way to the island's center, which is an active volcano, and eventually confront Megatron. Just as the volcano erupts after a grueling fight, Optimus attempts to save Megatron, but the latter refuses his help and allows himself to fall into the lava. Escaping from the volcano, the Autobots believe they won, unaware that the planet-sized Transformer Unicron has arrived on Cybertron.

As Unicron begins destroying Cybertron, Optimus, Red Alert and Hot Shot return home alongside all the rescued Mini-Cons, whose combined powers give the three Autobots the means to stop Unicron. Equipped with jetpacks and powered up weapons, they fly into Unicron and destroy his core, causing him to explode. Afterwards, the Autobots and the Mini-Cons celebrate their victory as Cybertron is finally at peace.

In the post-credits scene, a now-repaired Tidal Wave can be seen doing push-ups ready for revenge.

== Development ==
Prior to release, the game was titled Transformers Armada: Prelude to Energon. The worldwide debut of the Transformers PlayStation 2 demo occurred at TransformersCon on March 12–13, 2004. In September 2005, Atari released a Directors Cut of the game exclusively in the EU. This version includes several "Making of" movie clips and commercials on the game disc. A playable demo was included on the disc for Driv3r. Australian band Regurgitator provided the soundtrack to the game. The song "Wishbone" by the band Dropbox was used to promote the game.

== Reception ==
Reception

Aggregate scores
Aggregator	Score
GameRankings	78%
Metacritic	75/100

Review scores
Publication	Score
Edge	8/10
Electronic Gaming Monthly	7.67/10
Eurogamer	8/10
Game Informer	7/10
GamePro	3.5/5
GameSpot	7.8/10
GameZone	7.4/10
IGN	7.5/10
Official U.S. PlayStation Magazine	3.5/5
X-Play	4/5
Entertainment Weekly	B+
The Times	4/5

The game received "generally favorable" reviews, according to video game review aggregator Metacritic. GameSpot named it the best PlayStation 2 game of May 2004.
