= Peter Jessop =

American actor

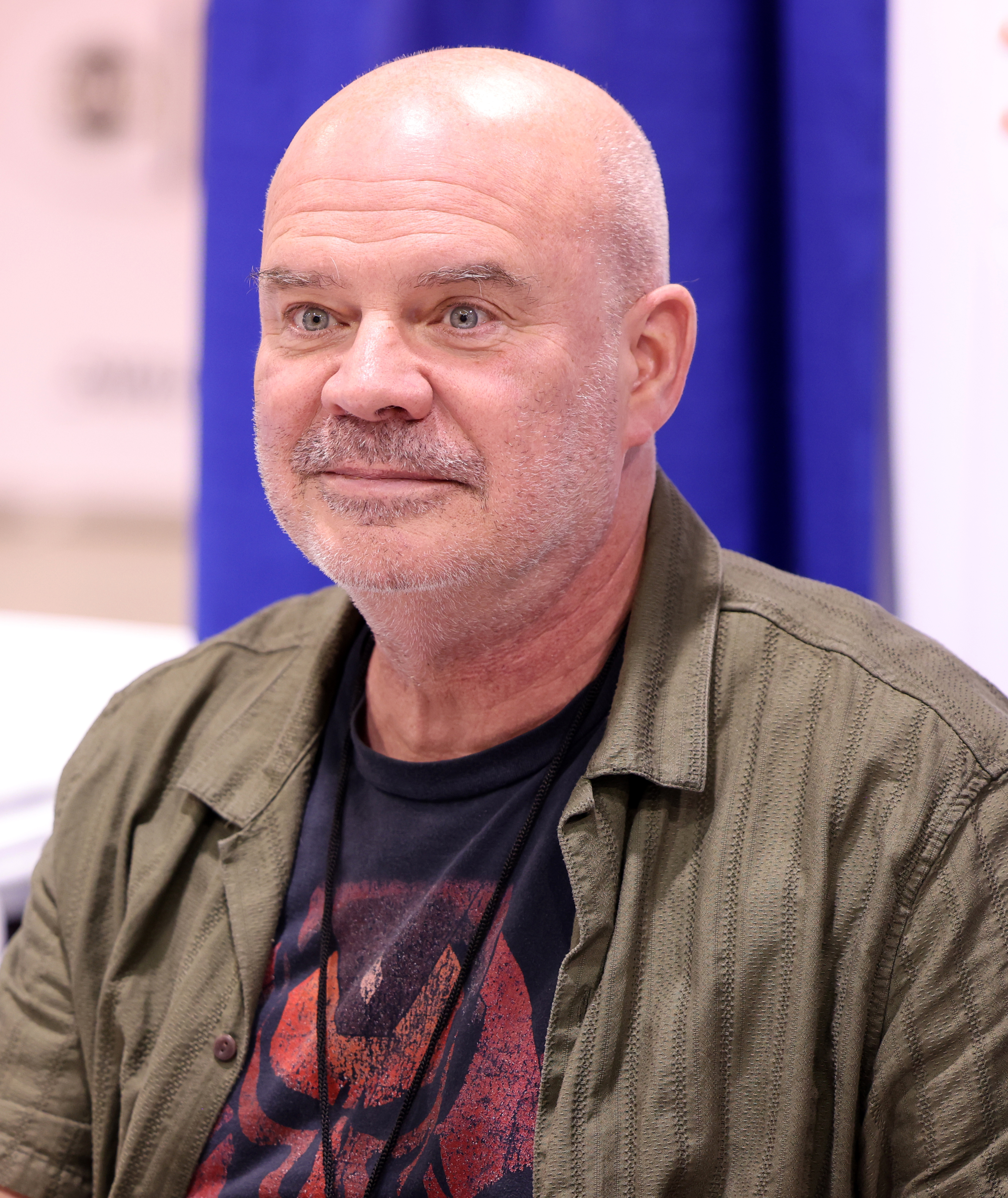
- Jessop in 2026
- Occupations: Actor; voice artist

Peter Jessop is an American actor who is known for his video game voice acting. He is known for the voice of Sovereign in Mass Effect, the voice of Miraak, the primary antagonist of The Elder Scrolls V: Skyrim – Dragonborn DLC, and the voice of Paladin Danse from the video game Fallout 4. He also voices the male exo player character in Destiny 2.

== Filmography ==
=== Film ===
Year	Title	Role	Notes
2004	De-Lovely	Sergei Diaghilev	
2009	Pig Bomb	Narrator	Voice, television film
2009	Rat Zilla	Narrator	Voice, television film
2010	Dante's Inferno: An Animated Epic	Virgil	Voice, direct-to-video
2011	Green Lantern: Emerald Knights	Salaak	Voice, direct-to-video
2013	Justice League: The Flashpoint Paradox	Nuidis Vulko	Voice, direct-to-video
2014	JLA Adventures: Trapped in Time	Superman	Voice, direct-to-video
2014	Batman: Assault on Arkham	Watch Commander	Voice, direct-to-video
2018	The Scorpion King: Book of Souls	Narrator	Voice, direct-to-video
2019	Justice League vs. the Fatal Five	Tharok	Voice, direct-to-video
2020	We Bare Bears: The Movie	Canadian Border Guard	Television film

=== Television ===
Year	Title	Role	Notes
2006–07	Avatar: The Last Airbender	Fung	2 episodes
2007	The King of Queens	Stuart	Episode: "Mild Bunch"
2008	The Batman	Curator	Episode: "What Goes Up..."
2009	Slacker Cats	Dolenzm	2 episodes
2011	Man Up	G.P.S. Voice	Episode: "Fear"
2012	30 Rock	Mayor MacCheese	Episode: "The Shower Principle"
2012	The Avengers: Earth's Mightiest Heroes	Vision	6 episodes
2013	Model Employee	Narrator	6 episodes
2015–18	Suspense	Fred Alexander, Black, Doctor Hardenstein, Jack Hardy	5 episodes
2017	Justice League Action	Steppenwolf	Episode: "Under a Red Sun"
2018	We Bare Bears	Director	Episode: "Family Troubles"
2019	SEAL Team	Commander Shaw	4 episodes
2024	Batman: Caped Crusader	Muller, Onomatopoeia's Henchman	Episode: "Moving Target"
2024	Dream Productions	Fink	Episode: "Romance!"

=== Video games ===
Year	Title	Role	Notes
1999	Battlezone II: Combat Commander	John Cooke	
2000	Starlancer	Trigger, Jordy Kruger	
2000	Escape from Monkey Island	Inspector Canard	
2002	Resident Evil	Albert Wesker	
2002	Summoner 2	Prince Neru	
2003	Command & Conquer: Generals	Col. Burton, Quad Cannon, Chinese Captain	Also Zero Hour
2003	Robin Hood: Defender of the Crown	Wilfred of Ivanhoe	
2005	Jade Empire	Inquisitor Lim, Master Smiling Hawk, Shipeng, additional voices	
2005	Medal of Honor: European Assault	Holt	
2006	Hitman: Blood Money	Vegas Guards, White House Guards	
2006	Justice League Heroes	Brainiac	
2006	Resistance: Fall of Man	Lt. Cartwright	
2006	The Lord of the Rings: The Battle for Middle-earth II: The Rise of the Witch-king	Gondorians	
2007	TimeShift	Additional voices	
2007	F.E.A.R. Perseus Mandate	Gavin Morrison	
2007	Mass Effect	Various voices	
2008	Resistance 2	Major Cartwright	
2009	Halo Wars	Additional voices	
2009	Resistance: Retribution	Steven Cartwright	
2009	Transformers: Revenge of the Fallen	Soundwave	
2009	Transformers Revenge of the Fallen: Decepticons	Soundwave	
2009	Wolfenstein	B.J. Blazkowicz	
2009	Dragon Age: Origins	Various voices	
2010	Mass Effect 2	Chesith, Daroth	
2011	Resistance 3	Haven Residents	
2011	Gears of War 3	Stranded Crew #2	
2011	Guild Wars 2	Balthazar	
2011	The Lord of the Rings: War in the North	Halbarad	
2012	Syndicate	Additional voices	
2012	Warhammer Online: Wrath of Heroes	Conrad	
2012	World of Warcraft: Mists of Pandaria	Arms Master Harlan	
2012	Dishonored	Assassin	
2012	The Elder Scrolls V: Skyrim – Dragonborn	Miraak	
2013	Aliens: Colonial Marines	Weyland Yutani Commandos	
2013	Metro: Last Light	Additional voices	
2013	Fast & Furious: Showdown	Agent Carson	
2013	The Bureau: XCOM Declassified	Myron Faulke	
2014	Destiny	Guardian: Exo Male	
2015	Evolve	Bucket	
2015	Fallout 4	Paladin Danse, Karl Oslow	
2017	Destiny 2	Guardian: Exo Male	
2018	Lego DC Super-Villains	Monsieur Mallah, Red Tornado, Steppenwolf, Two-Face	
2018	Red Dead Redemption 2	The Local Pedestrian Population	
2019	Gylt	Charon	
2020	Empire of Sin	Al Capone	
2022	Lost Judgment	Masao Igarashi	
2023	Destiny 2: Lightfall	Guardian: Exo Male	
2025	Fallout 76: Expeditions - The Pitt	Mac, Millstone	

=== Documentaries ===
- Bear Attack – Himself/narrator
- The Freemasons – Candidate
- The Science of Lust – Narrator
