= Redeco =

A redeco (from "redecorate") is a re-released version of an existing toy with a color scheme that is significantly different from the original release. Redecos normally include changes to the toy's paint application scheme, as opposed to a more straightforward repaint, which only alters the colors, not the ways in which they are applied to the toy. Redecos are an extremely popular way to create exclusive toys, allowing the new toy to look drastically different from the original, sometimes representing a different character, entity or item, without having to pay for an entirely new mold.

Examples:

- In Transformers with Decepticons, the toys of Starscream are often redecoed into Thundercracker and/or Skywarp. Similarly, toys of Optimus Prime are sometimes redecoed into Ultra Magnus or Nemesis Prime, and Megatron may be redecoed into Galvatron.
- Mighty Muggs all share essentially the same mold, with identity and characterization entirely provided only by the deco of each redeco.
