= Art doll =

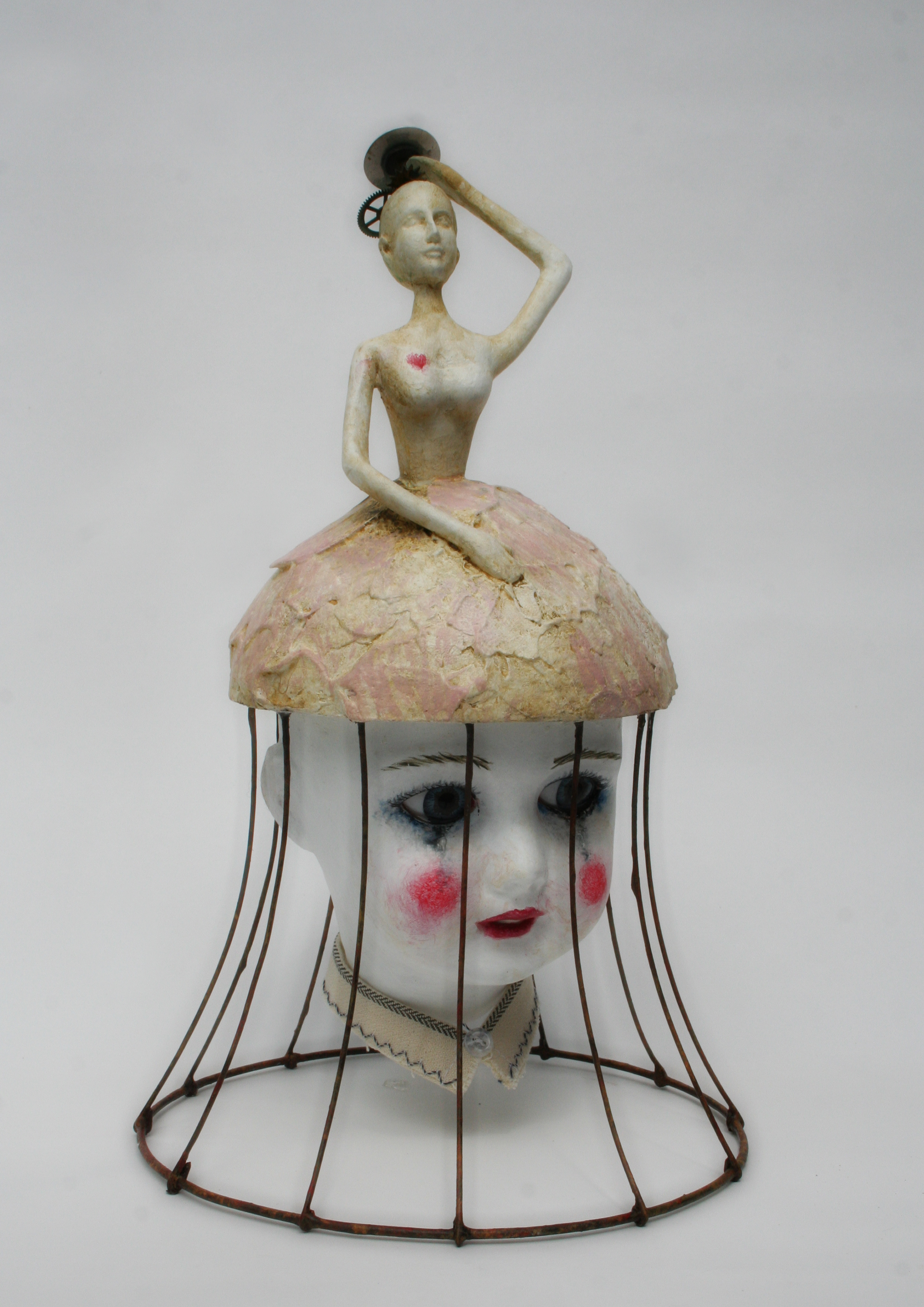
Orlando, mixed-media art doll sculpture

Art dolls are dolls created as works of fine art as opposed to toys.

== History ==
Art dolls, unlike modern toy dolls, are not mass-produced but rather hand-crafted. Historical dolls, such as kachina dolls and worry dolls, are forms of traditional folk art. In the 20th century, artists such as Hans Bellmer and Louise Bourgeois used dolls as a medium for artistic expression and to promote messages. Bellmer created sexually explicit ball-jointed dolls inspired by wooden dolls from the sixteenth century. Modern art dolls are popular among art collectors.

== Selected examples ==
2008's Melbourne Fringe Festival featured the work of Rachel Hughes and curator Sayraphim Lothian, amongst others. The elaborate ball-jointed ceramic dolls of Marina Bychkova fetch prices from $5,000 to $45,000, and are collected by the likes of Louis Vuitton designers. In 2010, Facebook banned images of an art doll by Bychkova posted by Sydney jeweller Victoria Buckley; included were images of a semi-naked doll used to display jewellery in her shop window. Eco-designer Ryan Jude Novelline created a commemorative art doll from a vintage Barbie recognizing marriage equality in the United States in June 2015.

== See also ==
- OOAK
- Repaint
