= Repaint =

Recolored toy

A repaint is a toy, typically a figure or doll, that was created entirely from a mold was previously available; however, the colors of the plastic and/or the paint operations have been changed. Repaints differ from redecos in that repaints do not alter the actual placement of paint applications while redecos do.

Since molds can be expensive to create, this is often seen as a comparatively inexpensive way for a toy company to make many different toys available in a cost-effective manner. It is also an effective way for toy manufacturers to produce exclusive figures, chase figures or other variants.

One of the many franchises that repaint their figures is Transformers. Bumblebee toys are sometimes repainted the color red to resemble another Transformers character: Cliffjumper.

In the collecting of 1:6th action figures, repainting has several methods. They can generally be narrowed down to 3 categories: paint, pastel and wash.

The term repaint also refers to fashion dolls whose original manufacturer face paint is removed and then repainted by an artist. Repaint styles include highly realistic treatments, fantasy makeovers, and celebrity likenesses. These dolls are often OOAK (one of a kind), although some artists create repaints in small limited editions.

== See also ==
- Palette swap, a comparable concept for video game characters
- Ball-jointed doll, a type of doll that is often customized and repainted
- Reborn dolls, baby dolls customized and repainted for realism
