= Transformers Autobots and Decepticons =

2007 video game

Transformers Autobots Transformers Decepticons
- Box art for Transformers Autobots
- Developer: Vicarious Visions
- Publisher: Activision
- Composers: Rod Abernethy; Jason Graves
- Series: Transformers
- Platform: Nintendo DS
- Release: NA: June 19, 2007; AU: July 4, 2007; EU: July 20, 2007
- Genre: Action-adventure
- Modes: Single-player, multiplayer

Transformers Autobots and Transformers Decepticons are two 2007 action-adventure video games developed by Vicarious Visions and published by Activision. They are both based on the science fiction action film Transformers (2007), being the Nintendo DS port of Transformers: The Game (also 2007). The two games share some basic similarities, but overall feature different characters, missions and locations. Both games received mixed reviews upon release.

== Gameplay ==
The game consists of four virtual locations, which are open world semi-destructible environments and enemies in the form of local law enforcement and opposing Transformers. "Hazard levels" denote the extent of attack the player character comes under based on how much destruction they perpetrate. Glowing spots on the map denote mission markers, which come in two varieties - twenty-three story missions, which further the game storyline, and thirty-four challenge missions, for players to test their skills. The game also features a slight RPG element in the form of XP, gained by destroying enemies and completing missions, which steadily increases players' levels (up to 20), unlocking new abilities and increasing stats. While a select number of missions allow players to take control of five of the Autobots or Decepticons featured in the movie, for the majority of the game, the player will control the "Create-A-Bot," a customizable generic Transformer whose alternate mode the player can determine by scanning any one of over thirty-five vehicles found throughout the game locations.(You can also name your Create-A-Bot.)

The games utilizes the Nintendo Wi-Fi Connection for the "AllSpark Wars" online campaign, which pits players of the two different versions of the game against each other. Players are able to download one new special single player challenge each day and earn points upon its completion. Their score is then uploaded to a server at the end of the challenge and the side with the most points at the end of the day (Autobots or Decepticons) wins the "battle". The first side to win seven battles wins the overall "war" and a new war begins. However, if the Autobots and Decepticons win at least one piece each, a "tiebreaker match" will be played until the whole Allspark is under control of either side. Players earn Wi-Fi tokens for their involvement, which will unlock additional vehicles and cheats for use while playing the main game. Despite the aforementioned Nintendo Wi-Fi Connection support, multiplayer death-matches are limited to localized wireless play. There is also a secret form for the custom character called "Skydive," which is countered by G1 Starscream, a somewhat improved Starscream, in the Decepticons game; both can be obtained by earning 2500 tokens through Wi-Fi play.

== Synopsis ==
=== Plot of Autobots ===
Upon landing on Earth, the Autobot rookie "Create-A-Bot" undergoes a basic systems check, under Ironhide's coordination, before defeating several Decepticons, including the Create-A-Bot from Transformers Decepticons, and taking on the form of a vehicle he scans. Afterwards, he arrives in Tranquility, where Optimus Prime teaches him to value the lives of the humans that all Autobots are sworn to protect, before meeting with Bumblebee, who has him scan additional vehicles, as well as the internet for information on a pair of glasses with a Decepticon code imprinted onto them. After informing the Create-A-Bot that both the Decepticon leader Megatron and the AllSpark might be on Earth, Bumblebee leaves to go to coordinates, only to discover the Decepticon Barricade has already claimed them. Bumblebee pursues and ultimately defeats Barricade, before learning from a news article that a "giant metal man" was found frozen in the Arctic.

The Create-A-Bot goes there and meets with Ironhide, before discovering that a human military organization called Sector 7 found Megatron and had him imprisoned at their base there, but later moved him to an unknown location. They also discover an encrypted file titled "Project: Ice Man" which they send to Optimus, before being attacked by the Decepticon second-in-command Starscream, whom Ironhide defeats. Returning to Tranquility, the pair rendezvous with Bumblebee, who has discovered that Sector 7 had adapted Megatron's technology into automated defenses which they have set up all over town. Once Bumblebee destroys them, Optimus Prime arrives on Earth with Jazz and Ratchet, and sends Jazz to retrieve several Sector 7 vehicles for analysis, one of which turns out to be Decepticon Blackout. After driving him off, Jazz meets with Optimus and they learn through the data they've retrieved that Sector 7 has both Megatron and the AllSpark kept hidden inside the Hoover Dam. Vowing to destroy his former brother, Optimus orders Bumblebee to distract Sector 7's forces, allowing the other Autobots to escape, though when Create-A-Bot recklessly tries to help, Bumblebee gets himself captured while saving him.

When Optimus decides to focus on retrieving the AllSpark rather than saving Bumblebee, Ironhide angrily accuses him of caring only about destroying Megatron, though he later apologizes. At the Hoover Dam, Jazz hacks into Sector 7's computer systems and learns where Bumblebee is being kept, before Create-A-Bot is sent to rescue him. Bumblebee reveals that he knows where the AllSpark is, and retrieves it along with his weapon chip, before meeting with Optimus, though they are intercepted by Barricade when they try to leave the dam. Optimus battles and kills him, but with his final words, Barricade reveals he was merely a distraction, allowing the other Decepticons to free Megatron. Ironhide and the Create-A-Bot eavesdrop on the Decepticons and learn that they've placed bombs on the dam, which the former disarms, while Optimus goes after Megatron. He is intercepted by Brawl, but quickly dispatches of him.

The Autobots head back to Tranquility with the AllSpark, pursued by the Decepticons. Blackout goes after Bumblebee, but is killed by Ratchet. Megatron soon shows up and takes the AllSpark, wounding Bumblebee in the process. Optimus then attempts to take him on alone, but Megatron uses the AllSpark to create drones that attack him. The Create-A-Bot arrives and manages to get the AllSpark away from Megatron, shoving it into his chest, which mortally wounds him as well. Optimus proceeds to battle the injured Megatron, ultimately killing him and destroying the AllSpark. Before he dies, the Create-A-Bot tells Optimus to make Earth the Autobots' new home. Optimus mourns his death and later honors his last wish by sending a message into space for any surviving Autobots to join them on Earth before driving off into the sunset with Bumblebee, Ratchet, and Ironhide.

=== Plot of Decepticons ===
Starscream sends his protégé, the "Create-A-Bot", to Earth to help Barricade investigate a faint Decepticon signal they received. After Create-A-Bot undergoes a basic systems check, under Barricade's coordination, they encounter a group of Autobots in the area, including the Create-A-Bot from Transformers Autobots, whom he destroys. He is then called to Tranquility and tasked with helping Barricade find the Autobot Bumblebee, who has information regarding Megatron, and whom they discover has learned from a news article about a frozen "giant metal man" found in the Arctic. The Create-A-Bot then relays this information to Starscream, who encourages him to earn Barricade's trust. While Create-A-Bot distracts the local police, Barricade finds and fights Bumblebee, defeating him and retrieving the information from him. It is revealed that a human military organization called Sector 7 had Megatron imprisoned at a base in the Arctic, but moved him to an unknown location, and that a file called "Project: Ice Man" has information regarding Megatron's current location.

Blackout and Create-A-Bot next head to a SOCCENT Military Base in Qatar, where they rendezvous with Brawl, who helps Create-A-Bot attack the airfield as a distraction, while Blackout cuts off communications and hacks into the humans' network to find the "Project: Ice Man" file. The Autobot Ratchet shows up with reinforcements, but is defeated and flees. Create-A-Bot then relays the information they found to Starscream, who informs him that Megatron and the AllSpark are on Earth, Megatron having followed it here years ago. Starscream encourages the Create-A-Bot not to tell anyone about the AllSpark being on Earth, claiming he wants to secure it and avoid having to fight with anyone else over it.

Back in Tranquility, Blackout discovers that Sector 7 has set up automated defenses made from Megatron's technology all over town, whom Create-A-Bot destroys, while Barricade uses the town's power plant to get enough energy to crack the file. After Brawl shields the plant's generators from Sector 7, Optimus Prime arrives on Earth with more Autobots. Create-A-Bot distracts them to give Barricade more time, culminating with him defeating Bumblebee and leaving him to be captured by Sector 7. Barricade then learns that the "ice man" described in the file is Megatron, who is being held at the Hoover Dam. The Decepticons attack the dam, with Brawl destroying several communication satellites and planting bombs as a contingency plan, while Starscream orders the Create-A-Bot to kill Megatron before Barricade can revive him. Troubled by these orders, Create-A-Bot relays them to his fellow Decepticons, who realize that Starscream wants to secure the AllSpark to ensure that no one can challenge him. Meanwhile, Barricade attacks a military base near the dam and finds a way inside after learning that Sector 7 joined forces with the Autobots. With Blackout's help, Barricade infiltrates the dam and finds that Sector 7 has kept Megatron frozen to study his technology, before unfreezing him.

With Megatron alive and leading the Decepticons once again, he vows to kill Starscream for his treachery and gives an inspiring speech to his followers, before Brawl arrives with the news that the Autobots have taken the AllSpark to Tranquility. The Decepticons attack the city, though Megatron is ambushed by Jazz, who disposed of the bombs Brawl planted earlier, and whom Megatron swiftly kills after a brief fight. In Tranquility, the Decepticons kill most of the Autobots, with Brawl taking down Ironhide, and Starscream eliminating Bumblebee. Blackout and Barricade then attempt to arrest Starscream, but he kills them both and escapes, despite Create-A-Bot's attempt to stop him. Elsewhere, Megatron battles and kills Optimus, before Starscream arrives and challenges him for leadership of the Decepticons. Alongside Create-A-Bot, Megatron pursues him to the casino strip where the former landed on Earth. Create-A-Bot attempts to kill Starscream by shoving the AllSpark into his chest, mortally wounding himself in the process, but to no avail. Megatron ultimately kills Starscream on his own, before executing the wounded Create-A-Bot, as he is no longer useful in his current state. With most of his troops dead, Megatron then transforms into a jet and flies off into the night sky, his destination unknown.

== Reception ==
Reception

Aggregate score
| Aggregator | Score |
|---|---|
| Metacritic | (Autobots) 67/100 (Decepticons) 66/100 |

Review scores
| Publication | Score |
|---|---|
| GameSpot | 6.5/10 |
| GameSpy | 3.5/5 |
| Nintendo Life | 4/10 |

Both games received "mixed or average" reviews, according to video game review aggregator website Metacritic.

Writing for GameSpy, Phil Theobald wrote that to his surprise, he enjoyed "the DS Transformers games more than the console versions". While he felt that gameplay was simplistic, he found the online modes to be "strangely addicting". Frank Provo from GameSpot remarked that the differences between the two titles were mostly "cosmetic" in nature. While he liked the fundamental gameplay premise and the cast performance, he was disappointed by the game's targeting system and camera, the game's short length and the excessive use of filler missions.

Sammy Barker from Nintendo Life was strongly critical of the game, describing it as "dull, repetitive and bland", and remarked that the two separate versions were "merely just a cash-in on Activision's side to get the most serious of Transformers fans to buy two games.
