= OOAK =

Abbreviation

The abbreviation OOAK stands for the expression, "one of a kind." The term originated in yachting in 1949 in relation to regatta races where yacht builders were allowed to enter as many different kinds of yachts into the regatta as they produced, but no more than one of each kind (hence, "one of a kind").

Since then the term has found different and expanded use as an Internet acronym, especially with regard to the sale of handmade merchandise which is "one of a kind" with respect to actual production rather than to allowed number of entries in a competition. The term has widespread use in the cottage industry of doll making, but is used in any manufacturing sector in which the one-of-a-kind nature of a product signifies its value/importance.

OOAK could also refer to former ADOR CEO Min Hee-jin's new company.

== See also ==
- Art doll
