= Laurentian Fan =

Underwater valley in the Atlantic Ocean

The Laurentian Fan or Laurentian Abyss is an underwater depression off the eastern coast of Canada in the Atlantic Ocean.

== Location and origin ==
Approximate location of the Laurentian Fan in the North Atlantic

The Laurentian fan is not a trench, but more of an "underwater valley". It is estimated to be at most ~ 6 km (3.7 miles; 19,685 ft) in depth. This feature is a product of glaciation and water currents from the Gulf of Saint Lawrence. It is part of the Laurentian cone region, bound by the Laurentian Channel and the Sohm Abyssal Plain. The approximate coordinates are 43°40′N 56°10′W.

== Ecosystem ==
Towards the end of the 1980s, it was discovered unexpectedly that the fan is the site of hydrothermal vents with their own ecosystems functioning in the absence of sunlight. These supported organisms such as vesicomyid and thyasirid clams, as well as marine gastropods and other epifauna similar to those found in hydrothermal and cold seep environments elsewhere.

== Popular culture ==
- The Laurentian Fan plays a geographic role in the plotline of the 1990 film The Hunt for Red October.
- The Laurentian Fan appears in the epilogue of the 2007 film Transformers, where the United States government dumps the remains of Megatron, the other defeated Decepticons, and the deceased Autobot Jazz into the fan, in hopes that the heavy underwater pressure will destroy their remains. The fan later reappears in the film's 2009 sequel Transformers: Revenge of the Fallen, from which the Decepticons recover and revive Megatron.

== See also ==
- Abyssal plain
