= Transformers: Revenge of the Fallen =

2009 film by Michael Bay

- Theatrical release poster
- Directed by: Michael Bay
- Written by: Ehren Kruger; Roberto Orci; Alex Kurtzman
- Based on: Hasbro's Transformers action figures
- Produced by: Lorenzo di Bonaventura; Tom DeSanto; Don Murphy; Ian Bryce
- Starring: Shia LaBeouf; Megan Fox; Josh Duhamel; Tyrese Gibson; John Turturro
- Cinematography: Ben Seresin
- Edited by: Roger Barton; Paul Rubell; Joel Negron; Thomas A. Muldoon
- Music by: Steve Jablonsky
- Production companies: DreamWorks Pictures; Paramount Pictures; Di Bonaventura Pictures; Hasbro Studios
- Distributed by: Paramount Pictures (Note: Distributed under the DreamWorks Pictures banner in the United States and Canada, and the Paramount Pictures banner internationally.)
- Release dates: June 8, 2009 (Tokyo, Japan); June 24, 2009 (United States)
- Running time: 150 minutes
- Country: United States
- Language: English
- Budget: $200–210 million
- Box office: $836.5 million

Transformers: Revenge of the Fallen is a 2009 American science fiction action film based on Hasbro's Transformers toy line. It is the sequel to Transformers (2007) and the second installment in the Transformers film series. Like its predecessor, the film was directed by Michael Bay and written by Ehren Kruger, Roberto Orci, and Alex Kurtzman. Set two years after the events of Transformers, the story recounts the battle between the Autobots, led by Optimus Prime (voiced by Peter Cullen), and the Decepticons, led by Megatron (voiced by Hugo Weaving). The Autobots and Sam Witwicky (Shia LaBeouf) ally again to face an ancient Decepticon named the Fallen (voiced by Tony Todd), who pursues revenge on Earth.

Development on a sequel to Transformers began by May 2007. With deadlines jeopardized by possible strikes by the Directors Guild of America and the Screen Actors Guild, Bay managed to finish the production on time with the help of previsualization and a scriptment. Shooting took place between May and September 2008, with locations in Egypt, Jordan, Pennsylvania, New Jersey, and California, as well as air bases in New Mexico and Arizona.

It debuted on June 8, 2009, at Roppongi Hills in Tokyo, Japan and was released on June 24 by Paramount Pictures in the United States. Despite receiving generally negative reviews from critics, and winning three Golden Raspberry Awards, including Worst Picture, the film surpassed its predecessor's box office gross worldwide with $836.5 million, making it the fourth-highest-grossing film of 2009. It was nominated for the Academy Award for Best Sound Mixing at the 82nd Academy Awards. With over 11 million home media sales in 2009, it was also the top-selling film of the year in the United States. It was followed by Transformers: Dark of the Moon in 2011.

== Plot ==
In 17,000 B.C., seven Primes—the highest ruling Cybertronians—collect Energon from Star Harvesters, machines that consume stars to harness their energy. The Primes have a sacred rule never to deplete a star that sustains life. One of them violates this rule by ordering the construction of a Star Harvester on Earth, for which he becomes "the Fallen", the original Decepticon, and is defeated by the other Primes.

In the present day, two years after the battle of Mission City, (Note: As depicted in Transformers (2007)) the Autobots and the humans have formed NEST (Non-biological Extraterrestrial Species Treaty), a classified joint task force to eliminate the remaining Decepticons. Two Decepticons, Sideways and Demolishor, are killed in Shanghai, but the latter warns of the Fallen's return. Later, the Decepticon Soundwave hacks a military satellite to track and steal the last known shard of the AllSpark from a US Navy base in Diego Garcia.

Meanwhile, Sam Witwicky, now attending college, finds a smaller AllSpark shard from when he used it to kill Megatron, and starts seeing Cybertronian symbols when he touches it. The shard brings many of the kitchen appliances to life, which attempt to kill Sam and his parents, but Bumblebee rescues them. Sam gives the shard to his girlfriend, Mikaela Banes, who captures the small Decepticon Wheelie when he attempts to steal it.

Meanwhile, the Constructicons use the other stolen shard to resurrect Megatron while tearing off parts from one of their own to repair his body, and Megatron returns to the Fallen. The Fallen sends Megatron and his second-in-command, Starscream, to kill Optimus Prime and capture Sam, who unknowingly contains knowledge of the AllSpark in his mind; Megatron believes the symbols Sam sees will lead the Decepticons to a new Energon source.

After Alice, a Decepticon Pretender posing as a college student, attacks them, the Decepticon Grindor takes Sam, his roommate Leo, and Mikaela to Megatron before the Autobots save them. Optimus battles Megatron, Starscream, and Grindor, killing the latter, but is killed by Megatron while defending Sam. The Decepticons launch devastating attacks worldwide. At the same time, Megatron and Soundwave hijack Earth's telecommunication systems, allowing the Fallen to send a message to the humans demanding that Sam be handed over to him.

Sam, Mikaela, and Leo then seek out alien expert and former Sector Seven agent Seymour Simmons, who reveals that Transformers have visited Earth for a long time. Some, known as Seekers, have remained hidden on the planet. With Wheelie's help, they track down an elderly Decepticon-turned-Autobot Seeker named Jetfire and use their shard to revive him. Inspired by Jetfire, Wheelie allies with the Autobots, and Jetfire teleports the group to Egypt, then sends them to locate the Matrix of Leadership, the key to the Star Harvester, which could also revive Optimus. The group finds the Matrix, which the Primes sacrificed themselves to conceal, but it disintegrates into dust.

Meanwhile, NEST forces and the Autobots land near the Giza pyramid complex, and the Decepticons attack them. The Constructicons combine to form Devastator, who reveals the Star Harvester hidden inside a pyramid before a Navy railgun destroys him, as U.S. military reinforcements and Jetfire arrive to assist. Multiple airstrikes from the Navy and the U.S. Air Force destroy many Decepticons, but Megatron manages to kill Sam. The Primes speak to Sam, saying that he has earned the right to bear the Matrix by sacrificing himself for Optimus. They revive Sam and grant him the Matrix, which he uses to resurrect Optimus. The Fallen steals the Matrix from a weakened Optimus and uses it to activate the Star Harvester. Jetfire, who Scorponok wounded before killing him, sacrifices himself to merge with Optimus, giving him additional power and flight. With this upgrade, Optimus destroys the Star Harvester and kills the Fallen. Distraught by his master's death, Megatron retreats with Starscream. The Autobots and their allies return to the United States, and Sam and Leo return to college.

== Cast ==
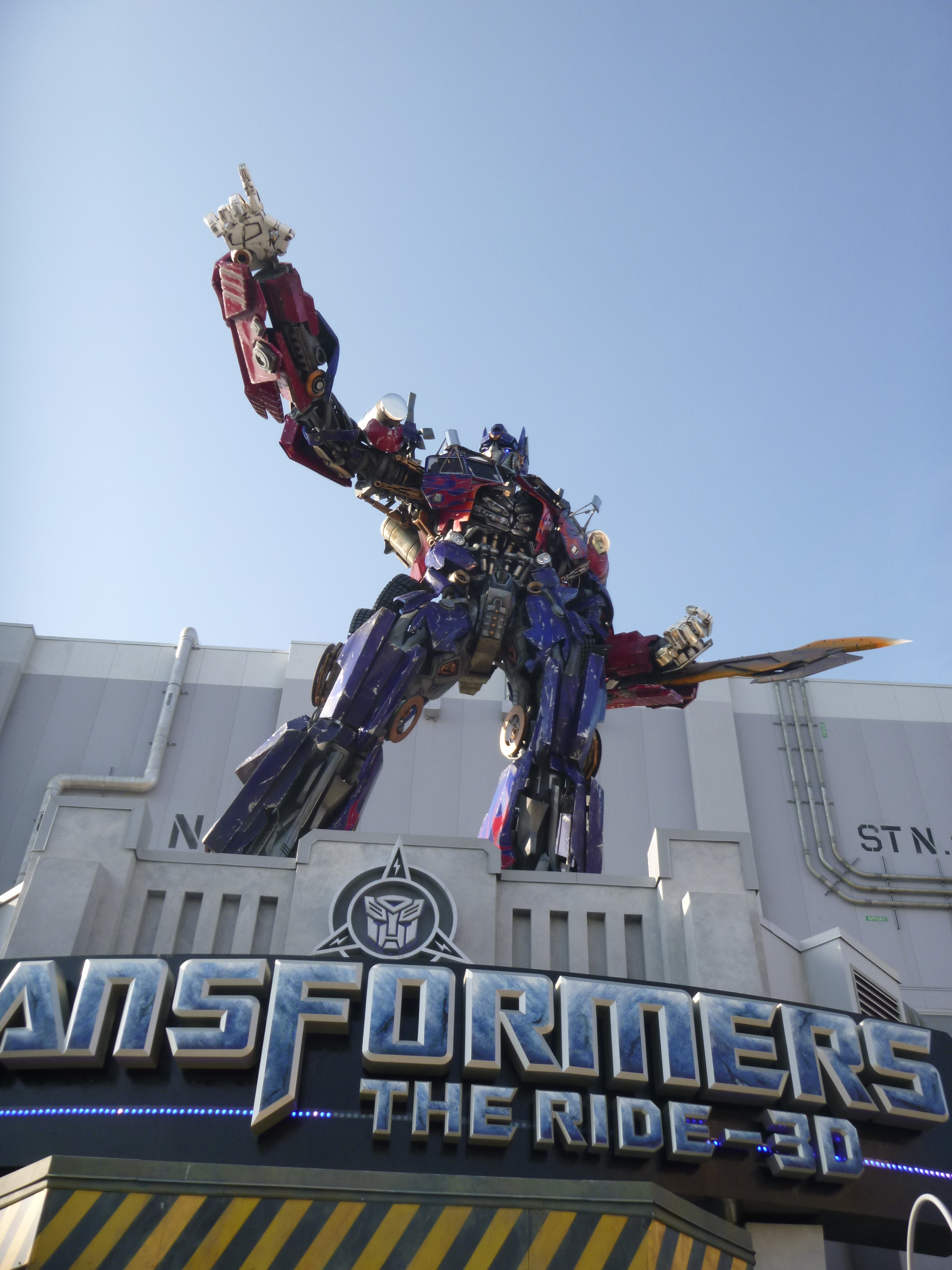
A statue of Optimus Prime at Universal Studios Florida

=== Live-action ===
- Shia LaBeouf as Sam Witwicky: A recent high school graduate who is unwittingly drawn again into the Autobot cause to unravel an ancient mystery implanted into his mind by the now-destroyed Allspark.
- Megan Fox as Mikaela Banes: Sam's girlfriend, whom he trusts as the AllSpark fragments begin to unravel.
- Josh Duhamel as Major William Lennox A U.S. Army Ranger who establishes NEST to help the Autobots in their battle against the remaining Decepticons.
- Tyrese Gibson as Robert Epps: A U.S. Air Force Master Sergeant and Combat Controller in Lennox's team who leads NEST's SWAT unit.
- John Turturro as Seymour Simmons: A former agent of the recently terminated Sector 7 who now runs a meat shop in New York City with his mother, Tova Simmons (played by Annie Korzen).
- Ramon Rodriguez as Leo Spitz: A college roommate of Sam's who runs an online conspiracy blog and is obsessed with the Transformers. Before Rodríguez was cast, Jonah Hill was in talks to play the role but Seth Rogen advised him to turn it down to focus instead on his own projects. Hill chose to do Night at the Museum: Battle of the Smithsonian instead.
- Kevin Dunn as Ron Witwicky: Sam's father.
- Julie White as Judith Witwicky: Sam's mother.
- Isabel Lucas as Alice: A female pretender sent to spy on Sam in college.
- John Benjamin Hickey as Theodore Galloway: A national security adviser who often chastises NEST and the Autobots for their destructive tactics.
- Glenn Morshower as General Morshower: The supervisor of NEST.
- Matthew Marsden as Captain Graham: a British Army Special Air Service NEST officer.
- Rainn Wilson as Professor R.A. Colan: Sam and Leo's astronomy teacher.
- Michael Papajohn as Cal Banes: Mikaela's father.
- Spencer Garrett as Air Force Chief of Staff
- Josh Kelly as Stone
- Deep Roy as Egyptian Guard

=== Voices ===
- Peter Cullen as Optimus Prime: The leader of the Autobots who transforms into a blue and red 1994 Peterbilt 379 semi-trailer truck.
- Tony Todd as The Fallen: A Prime who is the first Decepticon and founder of the Decepticons, as well as the master of Megatron.
- Hugo Weaving as Megatron: The Fallen's apprentice and the leader of the Decepticons who transforms into a flying Cybertronian tank.
- Mark Ryan as Jetfire: A former Decepticon Seeker turned Autobot who transforms into a Lockheed SR-71 Blackbird.
- Jess Harnell as Ironhide: The Autobot weapons specialist and Optimus's new second-in-command who transforms into a black 2009 GMC Topkick C4500.
- Robert Foxworth as Ratchet: The Autobot medical officer who transforms into a yellow 2009 search and rescue Hummer H2 ambulance.
- Charlie Adler as Starscream: Megatron's second-in-command who transforms into a Lockheed Martin F-22 Raptor.
- Frank Welker (Note: Ravage and Grindor are not listed in the credits.) as:
  - Soundwave: The Decepticon communications officer who orbits Earth as a Cybertronian satellite.
  - Ravage: A stealthy, jaguar-like Decepticon who transforms into a Cybertronian missile, is deployed by Soundwave.
  - Reedman: A razor-thin Decepticon composed of the "Microcons", thousands of Decepticons who transform into metal beads that are deployed by Ravage.
  - Grindor: A large Decepticon who transforms into a CH-53E Super Stallion helicopter.
  - Devastator: A massive Decepticon who is the combination of ten construction vehicles. In the Transformers lore, these vehicles are meant to be individual Decepticons called the Constructicons. In the film, however, only Mixmaster, Scrapper, Scrapmetal, and Long Haul transform into robots, and they appear separate from Devastator. Concept art was created for the others, but most of them were only featured in the related toy lines.
    The named Constructicons are:
    - Mixmaster: A black and silver Mack concrete mixer truck that transforms into the head.
    - Scrapper: A yellow Caterpillar 992G scoop loader that transforms into the right arm.
    - Scrapmetal: A yellow Volvo EC700C crawler excavator fitted with a Stanley UP 45SV attachment that transforms into the left hand.
    - Long Haul: A green Caterpillar 773B dump truck that transforms into the right leg.
    - Scavenger: A red and white Terex O&K RH 400 excavator that transforms into the upper torso and shoulders.
    - Hightower: A yellow Kobelco CKE2500 II crawler crane that transforms into the left arm.
    - Overload: A red KW Dart D4661 Tractor Truck articulated dump truck that transforms into the lower torso and thighs.
- André Sogliuzzo as Sideswipe: The Autobot combat instructor who transforms into a silver 2009 Chevrolet Corvette Stingray concept car.
- Tom Kenny as:
  - Wheelie: A former Decepticon spy, later turned Autobot, who transforms into a blue radio-controlled toy monster truck, based on a Ford F-350. Kenny has previously voiced several characters in Transformers Animated (2007-2009), including Starscream and Isaac Sumdac.
  - Skids: An Autobot infiltrator and Mudflap's twin who first transforms into the front half of a custom-built ice cream truck, and later, a green 2007 Chevrolet Beat.
- Reno Wilson as Mudflap: An Autobot infiltrator and Skids' twin who first transforms into the back half of a custom-built ice cream truck, and later, a red 2007 Chevrolet Trax.
- Grey DeLisle as Arcee, Chromia, and Elita-One: A trio of female Autobot sisters who transforms into a pink Ducati 848, a blue Suzuki B-King, and a purple MV Agusta F4, respectively. (Note: Chromia and Elita-One are not listed in the credits.)
- Calvin Wimmer as Demolishor: A massive Constructicon who transforms into a white and red Terex O&K RH 400 excavator.
- John DiCrosta as Scalpel: A spider-like Decepticon who transforms into a 1938 American Optical 603 lensmeter.
- Michael York as Prime #1: One of the seven Primes.
- Kevin Michael Richardson as:
  - Prime #2: One of the seven Primes.
  - Rampage: A Constructicon that transforms into a red Caterpillar D9T bulldozer. A yellow variant of him serves as Devastator's left leg. In the film, he is instead credited as "Skipjack".
- Robin Atkin Downes as Prime #3: One of the seven Primes

=== Non-speaking characters ===
- Jolt: An Autobot technician who transforms into a blue 2009 Chevrolet Volt.
- Sideways: A Decepticon surveillance agent who transforms into a silver 2009 Audi R8; he hides out in Shanghai alongside Demolishor.
- Scorponok: A scorpion-like Decepticon who was a minion of Blackout in the previous film.

== Production ==
=== Development ===
Before the release of Transformers (2007), Paramount Pictures began developing two sequels. Major hurdles for the film's initial production stages included the 2007–08 Writers Guild of America strike as well as the threat of strikes by other guilds. Prior to a potential Directors Guild of America strike, director Michael Bay began creating animatics of action sequences featuring characters rejected for the 2007 film. This would allow animators to complete sequences if the Directors Guild of America went on strike in July 2008, which ultimately did not happen. When asked about directing a sequel while promoting the first Transformers film, Bay said "you have your baby and you don't want someone else to take it".

Screenwriters Roberto Orci and Alex Kurtzman, who had written the first film, originally passed on the opportunity to write a sequel due to schedule conflicts. The studio began courting other writers in May 2007, but were unimpressed with other pitches and eventually convinced Orci and Kurtzman to return. The studio also hired Ehren Kruger, who had impressed Bay and Hasbro president Brian Goldner with his knowledge of the Transformers mythology. The writing trio were paid $8 million. Screenwriting was interrupted by the 2007–08 Writers Guild of America strike, but to avoid production delays, the writers spent two weeks writing a treatment, which they handed in the night before the strike began. Bay then expanded the outline into a 60-page scriptment, which included more action, humor, and characters. The three writers spent four months finishing the screenplay while "locked" in two hotel rooms by Bay; Kruger wrote in his own room and the trio would check on each other's work twice a day.

Orci described the film's theme as "being away from home", with the Autobots contemplating living on Earth as they cannot restore Cybertron, while Sam goes to college. He wanted the focus between the robots and humans "much more evenly balanced", "the stakes [to] be higher", and more focused on the science fiction elements. Orci added he wanted to "modulate" the humor more, and felt he managed the more "outrageous" jokes by balancing them with a more serious plot approach to the Transformers' mythology. Bay concurred that he wanted to please fans by making the tone darker, and that "mums will think it[']s safe enough to bring the kids back out to the movies." Two elements were added late into the film: the Autobot Jolt—as General Motors wanted to advertise the Chevrolet Volt—and the railgun that kills Devastator, a new acquisition by the United States military.

In September 2007, Paramount announced a release date for the sequel to Transformers in late June 2009. The film was given a $200 million budget, which was $50 million more than the first film, although Variety put the budget spend at over $210 million, after rebates. Some of the action scenes rejected from the first film were written into the sequel. Producer Lorenzo di Bonaventura later stated the studio proposed filming two sequels simultaneously, but he and Bay agreed that the idea was not the right direction for the series.

Before the first film's release, producer Tom DeSanto had "a very cool idea" to introduce the Dinobots, while Bay was interested in including a Transformer who transforms into an aircraft carrier, a concept which was dropped from the 2007 film. Orci claimed they did not incorporate these characters into Revenge of the Fallen because they could not think of a way to justify the Dinobots' choice of form, and were unable to fit in the aircraft carrier. Orci later admitted that he was dismissive of the Dinobots because he does not like dinosaurs, saying "I recognize I am weird in that department." However, he became fonder of them during filming because of their popularity with fans. He added "I couldn't see why a Transformer would feel the need to disguise himself in front of a bunch of lizards. Movie-wise, I mean. Once the general audience is fully on board with the whole thing, maybe Dinobots in the future." When asked on the subject, Michael Bay said he hated the Dinobots and they had never been in consideration for being featured in the movies.

During production, Bay attempted to create a misinformation campaign to increase debate over what Transformers would be appearing in the film, as well as to try to throw fans off from the story of the film; however, Orci confessed it was generally unsuccessful. The studio went as far as to censor MTV and Comic Book Resources interviews with Mowry and Furman, who confirmed Arcee and The Fallen would be in the picture. Bay told Empire that Megatron would not be resurrected, claiming his new tank form was a toy-only character, only for Orci to confirm Megatron would return in the film in February 2009. Bay also claimed he faked the leaking of daily call sheets from the first week of filming, that revealed Ramón Rodríguez's casting, and the appearance of Jetfire and the twins.

=== Filming ===
Principal photography lasted from roughly June to November 2008. Inspired by its use in Christopher Nolan's The Dark Knight, three action sequences in Revenge of the Fallen were shot using IMAX cameras. Although screenwriter Roberto Orci suggested that the IMAX footage would be 3-D, Bay later said he found 3D too "gimmicky". Bay added that shooting in IMAX was easier than using IMAX stereoscopic 3-D cameras.

The majority of interior scenes for the film were shot in the former Hughes Aircraft soundstages at Playa Vista. From June 2–4, the production filmed an action sequence at the Bethlehem Steel site in Bethlehem, Pennsylvania, which was used to represent a portion of Shanghai. Afterwards, they shot at the Steven F. Udvar-Hazy Center.

The crew moved to Philadelphia on June 9, where they shot at a defunct PECO Richmond power station, the University of Pennsylvania, Drexel University, the Eastern State Penitentiary, Laurel Hill Cemetery, Philadelphia City Hall, Rittenhouse Square, Wanamaker's, and historic Chancellor Street, which represents a street near Place de la Concorde in Paris.

The production moved to Princeton University on June 22. Filming there angered some students at the University of Pennsylvania, believing Bay had chosen to reshoot scenes at Princeton and script Princeton's name in the film. One shot that was filmed in the University of Pennsylvania was the party scene, filmed at what students call "The Castle". "The Castle" is home to the Psi Upsilon fraternity. However, neither the University of Pennsylvania nor Princeton gave Bay permission to be named in the film because of a scene that both institutions felt "did not represent the school" in which Sam's mother ingests marijuana-laced brownies.

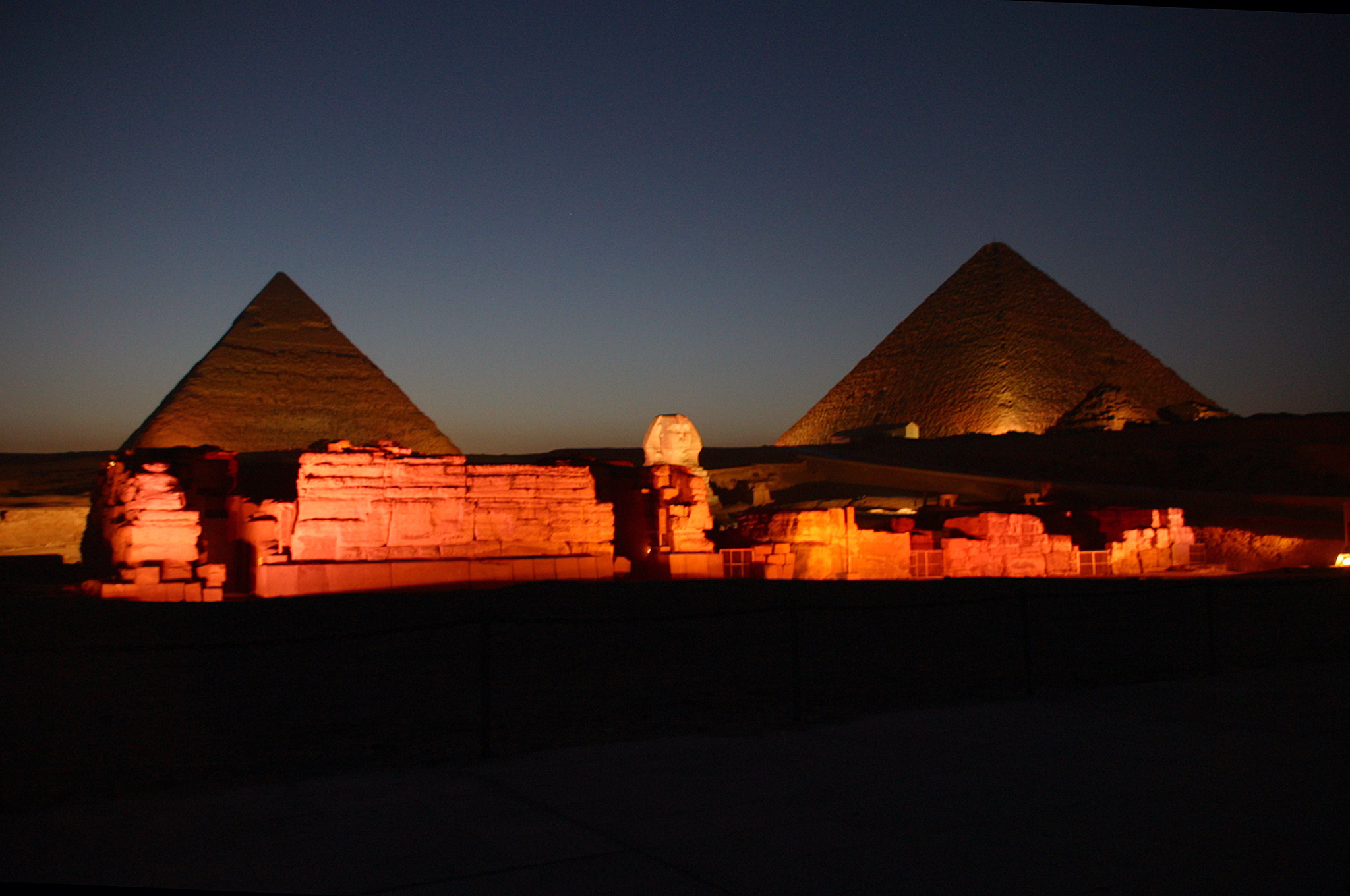
Three days of filming were spent in Egypt.

Bay scheduled a break for filming beginning on June 30, turning his attention to animation and second unit scenes because of the potential guild strike. Shooting for the Shanghai battle later continued in Long Beach, California. In September, the crew shot at Holloman Air Force Base and White Sands Missile Range in New Mexico. The two locations were used for Qatar in Transformers and stood in for Egypt in this film. A scale model in Los Angeles was also used for some close-ups of the pyramids. Shooting at Tucson International Airport and the 309th Aerospace Maintenance and Regeneration Group's aircraft boneyard took place in October under the fake working title Prime Directive (a reference to Star Trek). Filming also took place at Camp Pendleton, Davis–Monthan Air Force Base, Imperial Beach, Naval Amphibious Base Coronado, Naval Base Point Loma and San Diego Bay.

The first unit then shot for three days in Egypt at the Giza pyramid complex and Luxor. The shoot was highly secretive, but according to producer Lorenzo di Bonaventura, a crew of 150 Americans and "several dozen local Egyptians" ensured a "remarkably smooth" shoot. Bay earned the Egyptian government's approval to film at the pyramids by contacting Zahi Hawass, whom Bay said "put his arm around me and said, 'Don't hurt my pyramids.'" A 50-foot-tall (15 m) camera crane was used at the location. Bay stated he found the climax of the first film to be weak, partly because it was shot across five different city blocks, making the action confusing and hard to follow. On this film, the final battle in Egypt was devised to make it easier to follow the action.

Four days were then spent in Jordan; the Royal Jordanian Air Force aided in filming at Petra, Wadi Rum and Salt because King Abdullah II is a big fan of science fiction movies. Filming continued at the Place de la Concorde in Paris with second unit shots of the Eiffel Tower and the Arc de Triomphe. The cast and crew finished principal photography on the aircraft carrier USS John C. Stennis on November 2, 2008.

=== Visual effects ===
Hasbro became more involved in the designs of the robots than the company was for the first film. The company, along with Takara Tomy, suggested to the filmmakers that combining robots be the main draw for the sequel. They insisted on keeping the alternate modes of some of the returning characters similar so that consumers would not have to buy toys of the same characters. Bay used a real F-16 Fighting Falcon and tank fire when filming the battles. Many of the new Autobot cars supplied by General Motors were brightly colored to look distinctive on screen. Revenge of the Fallen features 46 robots, while the original movie had 14.

Scott Farrar returned as visual effects supervisor and anticipated moodier use of lighting as well as deeper roles for the Decepticons. He stated that with the bigger deadline, post-production would become a "circus". The producers expected that with a bigger budget and with the special effects having worked out, the Transformers would have a larger role. Peter Cullen recalled, "Don Murphy mentioned to me, 'Only because of the tremendous expense to animate Optimus Prime, he'll be in just a certain amount of [Transformers].' But he said, 'Next time, if the movie is a success, you're gonna be in it a ton.'" Michael Bay hoped to include more close-ups of the robots' faces. The heads had to be designed with more pieces in order to express emotions in a more convincing way. Farrar said the animators implemented more "splashes and the hits and the fighting on dirt or moving, banging into trees, [...] things splinter and break, [the robots] spit, they outgas, they sweat, they snort." Shooting in the higher resolution of IMAX required up to 72 hours to render a single frame of animation. While ILM used 15 terabytes for Transformers, they used 140 for the sequel. Particularly problematic effects were the lighting, with scenes such as Jetfire inside the Smithsonian requiring 41 light sources, and the destruction of the pyramid, which appears in about five shots and required seven months to simulate the behavior of the blocks. Orci hinted the majority of the Decepticons were entirely computer-generated in both robot and alternate modes, making it easier to write additional scenes for them in post-production. Rendering the Devastator took over 85% of ILM's render farm capacity, and the complexity of the scene and having to render it at IMAX resolution caused one computer to "explode". Digital Domain handled work on secondary characters, including the transformation of Alice from her human disguise to her robot self. The beginning showing a close-up of her face as the skin broke apart took five animators three months to finish.

=== Music ===
The score to Revenge of the Fallen was composed and produced by Steve Jablonsky, who reunited with director Michael Bay to record his score at the Sony Scoring Stage. Jablonsky and his score producer Hans Zimmer composed various interpretations of a song by Linkin Park called "New Divide" for the score. Rapper Kid Cudi's 2009 single "Sky Might Fall" appears in the extended trailer.

== Marketing and promotion ==
The marketing campaign for Revenge of the Fallen cost $150 million. Hasbro's Revenge of the Fallen toy line included new molds of new and returning characters, as well as 2007 figures with new mold elements or new paint schemes. The first wave was released on May 30, although Bumblebee and Soundwave debuted beforehand. The second wave came in August 2009, which introduced toys such as 2¼-inch human action figures that fit inside the transforming robots, and non-transforming replicas of the cars that can be used on a race track. Product placement partners on the film include Burger King, 7-Eleven, LG Phones, Kmart, Papa John's, Walmart, YouTube, Nike, Inc., M&M's, and Snickers. General Motors' financial troubles limited its involvement in promotion of the sequel, although Paramount acknowledged that with or without GM, their marketing campaign was still very large and had the foundation of the 2007 film's success. Kyle Busch drove a Revenge of the Fallen decorated car at Infineon Raceway on June 21, 2009, while Josh Duhamel drove a 2010 Camaro at the Indianapolis 500. At the movie's launch in China, a version of Bumblebee was constructed using a Volkswagen Jetta.

=== Printed media ===
Chris Mowry and artist Alex Milne, who had collaborated on The Reign of Starscream comic book, reunited for IDW Publishing's prequel to the film. Originally set to be a five-part series entitled Destiny, it was split into two simultaneously published series, titled Alliance and Defiance. Alliance is drawn by Milne and began in December 2008; it focuses on the human and Autobot perspectives. Defiance, which started the following month, is drawn by Dan Khanna and is set before either film, showing the beginnings of the war.

After the 2007 film, and serving as a bridge between the two films, Alan Dean Foster wrote Transformers: The Veiled Threat, originally titled Infiltration. During the writing, Foster collaborated with IDW to make sure their stories did not contradict each other.

The first printed media directly related to the second film was a 32-page coloring and activity book by publisher HarperCollins, which became available on May 5, 2009 and was the first official source to openly give out key plot points to the film. On June 1, 2009 DK Publishing published a 96-page book entitled Transformers: The Movie Universe, which intended to provide factual data on the characters of the film.

On June 10, 2009, the comic book adaptation of the film, written by Simon Furman was released. Additionally, Alan Dean Foster also wrote the novelization for the film. Meanwhile, Dan Jolley wrote Transformers: Revenge of the Fallen: The Junior Novel, a 144-page book oriented at a younger audience than the one by Foster. Lastly, a book titled Transformers: The Art of the Movies was released, documenting behind-the scenes aspects of the making of the film.

Other minor tie-in publications include Transformers: Revenge of the Fallen: The Last Prime, Transformers: Revenge of the Fallen: The Reusable Sticker Book, Transformers: Revenge of the Fallen: Made You Look!, Transformers: Revenge of the Fallen: Rise of the Decepticons, Transformers: Revenge of the Fallen: Spot the 'Bots', Transformers: Revenge of the Fallen: Mix and Match, Operation Autobot, When Robots Attack and Transformers: Revenge of the Fallen 2010 Wall Calendar.

=== Video games ===
On June 23, 2009, Activision published a video game based on the film for PlayStation 3, Xbox 360, PlayStation 2, PlayStation Portable, Wii, Games for Windows, and Nintendo DS.

- The PlayStation 3 and Xbox 360 versions were developed by Luxoflux and published by Activision.
- The Games for Windows version was developed by Beenox, which is similar to the PS3 and Xbox 360 version
- The Wii and PlayStation 2 versions were developed by Krome Studios.
- The PlayStation Portable version was developed by Savage Entertainment.
- The Nintendo DS version was developed by Vicarious Visions, which is separated into two games, Autobots and Decepticons.

== Release ==
=== Theatrical ===
Revenge of the Fallen premiered on June 8, 2009, in Tokyo, Japan. After its UK release on June 19, it was released in regular and IMAX theaters in North America on June 24, although some theaters held limited-access advance screenings on June 22. Linkin Park held a special show after the premiere at the Fox Theater, Westwood Village on June 22, during which they performed "New Divide" live for the first time. The IMAX release featured additional scenes of extended robot fighting sequences, which were not seen in the regular theater version.

=== Home media ===
The film was released in two-disc Blu-ray and DVD editions, and a single-disc DVD version on October 20, 2009, in North America. Michael Bay has revealed that the Blu-ray release of the film, produced by Charles de Lauzirika, features variable aspect ratio for the scenes shot in IMAX format. A special "Big Screen" IMAX edition was available exclusively at Walmart. Home versions include over three hours of bonus content and several interactive features, including "The AllSpark Experiment", which reveals Michael Bay's plans for a third movie in the series. At Target, the DVD and Blu-ray versions include a transformable Bumblebee case. Both two-disc editions are the first to include Paramount's augmented reality feature, which allows the user to handle a 3-D model of Optimus Prime on a computer by moving the package in front of a webcam. First-week sales of the DVD reached 7.5 million copies, making it the best-selling DVD of 2009. The Blu-ray version had the best first-week sales of 2009, with 1.2 million units. Transformers: Revenge of the Fallen was released on 4K UHD Blu-ray on December 5, 2017. The film grossed $276 million in home sales.

== Reception ==
=== Box office ===
Transformers: Revenge of the Fallen earned $16 million from Tuesday midnight previews, setting a record for the biggest Wednesday midnight debut at the time. It held the record for the biggest preview grosses for a Paramount film until Top Gun: Maverick surpassed it in 2022 with $19.3 million. On its opening day, the film grossed $62 million, surpassing Harry Potter and the Order of the Phoenix ($44.2 million) for the biggest Wednesday opening in history. It also ranked as the second-biggest opening day ever at the time, behind The Dark Knight. The record for biggest Wednesday opening was broken the following year by The Twilight Saga: Eclipse, which earned $68.5 million. Revenge of the Fallen grossed $109 million during its opening weekend, the seventh-largest opening weekend at the time. Its Friday-to-Sunday gross also set a new record for the biggest June opening weekend, surpassing Harry Potter and the Prisoner of Azkaban ($93.7 million), before being overtaken by Toy Story 3 the following year. The film earned $200 million during its first five days, the second-largest five-day opening at the time behind The Dark Knight ($203.7 million). It retained the record for the biggest five-day Wednesday opening until The Super Mario Bros. Movie earned $204.6 million in 2023.

Revenge of the Fallen remained at number one at the box office for two consecutive weekends. Although initial studio estimates projected a tie with Ice Age: Dawn of the Dinosaurs, final figures showed Revenge of the Fallen retaining the top position with $42.3 million. It was overtaken in its third weekend by Brüno and the second weekend of Ice Age: Dawn of the Dinosaurs. The film became the first release of 2009 to surpass $300 million at the North American box office. On July 27, one month after its release, it reached $379.2 million domestically, placing it among the ten highest-grossing films of all time in the United States and Canada at the time.

The film closed from theaters on October 15, 2009, after grossing $402.1 million in the United States and Canada and $434.2 million in other territories, bringing its worldwide total to $836.5 million. It was the second-highest-grossing film of 2009 in the United States and Canada behind Avatar, and the fourth-highest-grossing film worldwide behind Avatar, Harry Potter and the Half-Blood Prince, and Ice Age: Dawn of the Dinosaurs. At the end of its theatrical run, it ranked as the 37th-highest-grossing film in the United States and Canada. Box Office Mojo estimates that the film sold over 53 million tickets domestically.

=== Critical response ===
On Rotten Tomatoes, the film has an approval rating of 19% based on 248 reviews, with an average rating of 4.1/10. The site's critical consensus reads, "Transformers: Revenge of the Fallen is a noisy, underplotted, and overlong special effects extravaganza that lacks a human touch." On Metacritic, the film has an average score of 35 out of 100, based on 32 critics, indicating "generally unfavorable reviews". Audiences polled by CinemaScore gave the film an average grade of "B+" on an A+ to F scale.

According to The Washington Post, Revenge of the Fallen was Bay's worst-reviewed film at the time of release, faring even worse than Pearl Harbor (2001). Betsy Sharkey of the Los Angeles Times described the film as "in-your-face, ear-splitting and unrelenting. It's easy to walk away feeling like you've spent 2 hours in the mad, wild, hydraulic embrace of a car compactor".

Roger Ebert, who had given the 2007 film three stars, gave the sequel only one, calling it "...a horrible experience of unbearable length", a phrase which later became the title of his third bad-movie-reviews collection. Later in his review, Ebert discouraged movie-goers from seeing the film by saying "If you want to save yourself the ticket price, go into the kitchen, cue up a male choir singing the music of hell, and get a kid to start banging pots and pans together. Then close your eyes and use your imagination." He later wrote on his blog about the film, "The day will come when Transformers: Revenge of the Fallen will be studied in film classes and shown at cult film festivals. It will be seen, in retrospect, as marking the end of an era. Of course there will be many more CGI-based action epics, but never again one this bloated, excessive, incomprehensible, long (149 minutes) or expensive ($200 million)." Ebert would continue to lambast the film (and, sometimes, the Transformers franchise in general) in other movie reviews and responses to letters and emails sent to him. Rolling Stone critic Peter Travers called it "beyond bad, it carves out its own category of godawfulness" and did not give the film any stars, considering that "Revenge of the Fallen has a shot at the title 'Worst Movie of the Decade'." Travers named it the worst of 2009 and later the "worst film of the decade".

Some reviews were less harsh, with the film's CGI effects receiving praise. The A.V. Club gave the film a "C−", complaining about the writing and length, but mentioning the effects and action scenes were impressive. Among positive reviews, Amy Biancolli of the Houston Chronicle called it "a well-oiled, loudly revving summer action vehicle that does all that's required, and then some", Jordan Mintzer from Variety said it "takes the franchise to a vastly superior level of artificial intelligence", and Owen Gleiberman of Entertainment Weekly wrote that "Revenge of the Fallen may be a massive overdose of popcorn greased with motor oil. But it knows how to feed your inner 10-year-old's appetite for destruction." A review from Empire said: "What saves it, just about, are the effects. At times the frame is so packed with whirring cogs and twirling cranks that you could replicate the effect by staring at the innards of a domestic appliance, but when these CGI moto-men from another world duke it out, the images are often so screwy it's impossible to do anything but sit and stare."

There was considerable negative reaction to the characters Mudflap and Skids, who some perceived as embodying racist stereotypes. Manohla Dargis of The New York Times said that "the characters [...] indicate that minstrelsy remains as much in fashion in Hollywood as when, well, Jar Jar Binks was set loose by George Lucas". Critic Scott Mendelson said "To say that these two are the most astonishingly racist caricatures that I've ever seen in a mainstream motion picture would be an understatement." Harry Knowles, founder of Ain't It Cool News, went further, asking his readers "not to support this film" because "you'll be taking [your children] to see a film with the lowest forms of humor, stereotypes, and racism around." Bay (the director) has attempted to defend the film as "good clean fun" and insisted that "We're just putting more personality in." Writers Roberto Orci and Alex Kurtzman responded to the controversy with "It's really hard for us to sit here and try to justify it. I think that would be very foolish, and if someone wants to be offended by it, it's their right. We were very surprised when we saw it, too, and it's a choice that was made. If anything, it just shows you that we don't control every aspect of the movie." Tom Kenny stated in a late 2020 interview that he was hired as a placeholder for the role of Skids, but that Bay ended up using Kenny's voice in the final version of the film; a decision that Kenny admitted he was embarrassed by.

Actor Shia LaBeouf was unimpressed with the film, stating "We got lost. We tried to get bigger. It's what happens to sequels. It's like, how do you top the first one? You've got to go bigger. Michael Bay went so big that it became too big, and I think you lost the anchor of the movie...You lost a bit of the relationship. Unless you have those relationships, then the movie doesn't matter. Then it's just a bunch of robots fighting each other." Bay has admitted his disappointment with the film and has apologized, saying the film was "crap" and blaming the 2007–08 Writers' strike, saying "It was very hard to put (the sequel) together that quickly after the writers' strike (of 2007–08)".

=== Accolades ===
In a year-end poll administered by Moviefone, the film won in both the best and worst categories. It was voted the "worst film of 2009" by 24% of those surveyed, while also winning the vote for "best action movie" again with 24% of the vote. Fox's performance was voted the worst by an actress that year, and she was also voted the year's sexiest star. Comcast ranked the film as the 4th-worst sequel of all time. Empire named the film the 25th-worst movie ever made. In June 2009, David Germain from the Associated Press called the film the "worst-reviewed $400 million hit ever".

Revenge of the Fallen was nominated for Best Sound Mixing (Greg P. Russell, Gary Summers, and Geoffrey Patterson) at the 82nd Academy Awards. The film won five Scream Awards, for Best Actress (Megan Fox), Breakout Performance-Female (Isabel Lucas), Best Sequel, Best F/X, and Scream Song of the Year ("New Divide"); and two Teen Choice Awards, for Choice Summer Movie Star: Female (Megan Fox) and Choice Summer Movie Star: Male (Shia LaBeouf). Revenge of the Fallen was also nominated for the Saturn Award for Best Science Fiction Film but lost to Avatar, Satellite Awards for Best Visual Effects and Best Sound, a VES Award for Outstanding Visual Effects in a Visual Effects Driven Feature Motion Picture, a SAG Award for Outstanding Performance by a Stunt Ensemble, and an MTV Movie Award for Best WTF Moment (Isabel Lucas turning into a Decepticon). Shia LaBeouf, the film and Megan Fox were nominated at the Nickelodeon Kids' Choice Awards for Favorite Movie Actor, Favorite Movie and Favorite Movie Actress, respectively. Revenge of the Fallen received each nomination at two Golden Trailer Awards ceremonies: Best Teaser (2009) and Best Animation/Family TV Spot (2010).

It was nominated for seven Razzie Awards including Worst Actress for Megan Fox (also for Jennifer's Body), Worst Supporting Actress for Julie White, Worst Screen Couple (for Shia LaBeouf and Megan Fox) and Worst Prequel, Remake, Rip-off or Sequel, winning three in the Worst Picture, Worst Director, and Worst Screenplay categories at the 30th Golden Raspberry Awards.

== Sequels ==
The third film, Transformers: Dark of the Moon was released on June 29, 2011. The fourth film, Transformers: Age of Extinction was released on June 27, 2014. The fifth film, Transformers: The Last Knight was released on June 21, 2017. A spin-off, titled Bumblebee was released on December 21, 2018. Transformers: Rise of the Beasts was released on June 9, 2023.
