= Starscream =

Transformers character

- Transformers character
- Starscream art by IDW Publishing
- First appearance: The Transformers #1 (September 1984)
- Based on: Jet Robo by Takara
- Voiced by: Chris Latta, Hirotaka Suzuoki, others

In-universe information
- Affiliation: Decepticon

Starscream is a fictional robotic character in the Transformers franchise produced by the American toy company Hasbro and the Japanese toy company Takara Tomy. He is the second-in-command of the Decepticons, a villainous faction of alien robots that seeks to conquer their home planet of Cybertron and the rest of the known universe. As with all Cybertronians, Starscream can disguise himself by transforming into vehicles, in his case a fighter jet, and he is usually portrayed as a treacherous and cowardly air commander who seeks to overthrow the Decepticon leader Megatron and assume control of the Decepticons.

== History ==
The toy that would become Starscream first appeared in the 1983 Diaclone toy catalog, in which it is introduced as one of two colorations for a toy called "Jet Robo" that transforms into a fighter jet. The original suggestion for the character's name was "Ulchtar", and other options included "Silver Snake" and "Pretty Poison". Bob Budiansky convinced Hasbro to name the character Starscream instead. Starscream has appeared in many adaptations of the Transformers franchise, often with different stories. In the comic series by Marvel Comics, his backstory says that he was the leader of a criminal organization before joining Megatron, while the comic series by Dreamwave Productions depicts him as a former scientist-turned-gladiator. Both of the comic timelines by IDW Publishing depict him as a former politician.

Starscream is depicted in the original cartoon as a central villain that serves as the second-in-command to the Decepticon leader Megatron. His personality is depicted as treacherous and he frequently tries to undermine and overthrow Megatron in order to take over as Decepticon leader. Although Megatron is aware of Starscream's treachery, he never inflicts any lasting punishment on him. Starscream's 1980s cartoon appearance is voiced by Christopher Collins in English and by Hirotaka Suzuoki in Japanese. In The Transformers: The Movie, Megatron is mortally wounded in a battle with Optimus Prime, the heroic leader of the Autobots. Rather than saving Megatron, Starscream ejects Megatron into space to finally take his place. However, Megatron is found by Unicron, and Unicron rebuilds Megatron into Galvatron. Starscream holds a coronation for himself, but it is interrupted by Galvatron, who incinerates Starscream and destroys his crown. Some time later, Starscream re-emerges as a vengeful ghost, having survived his incineration as an immortal "spark" that is equivalent to a soul, and encounters the Decepticon deserter Octane. Starscream plots his revenge against Galvatron for destroying him. In the 1990s, the Transformers franchise was rebooted as Transformers: Beast Wars. Starscream's ghost reappears in the Beast Wars series, set in a future timeline after the initial arrival of the Autobots and Decepticons on Earth four million years ago. His spark travels back in time and possesses the Predacon Waspinator, taking the name Waspscream. Starscream's spark is soon blasted out of Waspinator's body and returns to space.

Starscream appears in the live-action 2007 Transformers film directed by Michael Bay. In this film, Starscream is not characterized as a traitor like in the original series, but rather as sycophantic to Megatron. While filming at Kirtland Air Force Base, Michael Bay was impressed by the "piercing stare" of Air Force Major Brian Reece, so he allowed him to make a cameo appearance in the film as a hologram within the cockpit of Starscream's jet mode. In the film series, Starscream transforms into a Lockheed Martin F-22 Raptor. He also appears in the film's sequels, Revenge of the Fallen and Dark of the Moon. He is ultimately killed in Dark of the Moon by Sam Witwicky, the human protagonist of the film series. He briefly appears in the opening scene of the reboot film Bumblebee, this time more closely resembling his original cartoon design.

Starscream returns in Transformers One. This film depicts the origins of Starscream's relationship with Megatron. In the film, Starscream is the leader of the Cybertron High Guard, a group working to sabotage and overthrow Sentinel Prime. D-16 (later named Megatron) challenges Starscream for leadership and overpowers him in a fight. The High Guard ultimately follow Megatron and become known as the Decepticons. In Transformers One, Starscream is voiced by Steve Buscemi.
