= List of Bastard!! characters =

This is a list of characters of the manga series Bastard!!.

== Main characters ==
Dark Schneider (ダーク・シュナイダー, Dāku Shunaidā) / Lucien Renlen (ルーシェ・レンレン, Rūshe Renren)
Voiced by: Kazuki Yao (Dark Schneider, OVA), Yuriko Fuchizaki (Lucien, OVA), Kishō Taniyama (Dark Schneider, ONA), Kanae Itō (Lucien, ONA) (Japanese); Daran Norris (Dark Schneider, OVA), Brianne Siddall (Lucien, OVA), Anne Yatco (Lucien, ONA) (English)
Dark Schneider (noted to be named after Udo Dirkschneider) is the most powerful wizard, revealed to have been created during the final days of the Old World by the Ten Wise Men of Europa as the pilot of the "Dragon Knight", a 500 meters (1,600 ft) mecha created to destroy Anthrasax. Following the cataclysm, Dark spent the four centuries cheating death while seeking world dominion and amassing a large harem. Fifteen years prior to the storyline, Dark amassed the Dark Rebel Army from thousands of wizards and warriors, led by his Riders of Havoc, Arshes Nei, Gara and Kall-Su. Dark was defeated by Metallicanan prince Lars Ul Metallicana, reincarnating himself inside the body of Lucien Renren before his spirit is sealed within the newborn by Geo Soto Noto, causing Lucien to grow up into different person. When the reformed Dark Rebel Army commenced a campaign to resurrect Anthrasax, Dark's seal is broken as he becomes a reluctant ally of Metallicana while winning back his Riders of Havoc before resuming his ambition. While originally requiring Yoko to kiss Lucien to manifest, Dark gradually gains the ability to freely take over his host.
After losing his battle against Anthrasax, Dark is cast into the depths of the upper levels of Hell where he encounters the fallen angel Satan. Satan reveals to Dark that he is a reabsorbed fragment of his brother Lucifer, the first fallen angel and Lucien's true identity, who is destined to lead demons and mankind to war against Heaven, but Dark refuses to align himself with Hell and then is thrust into battle with the High Commander of Hell, Porno Diano. Four years later, he returns to Earth and fights alongside the Seraphim against the devil Konron (Conlon). His body is destroyed by Konron's Trelldor Spinning Fist attack, but his head survives.
Tia Noto Yoko (ティア・ノート・ヨーコ, Tia Nōto Yōko)
Voiced by: Yuka Koyama (OVA), Tomori Kusunoki (ONA) (Japanese); Wendee Lee (OVA), Erin Yvette (ONA) (English)
Yoko is a strong-willed and somewhat temperamental redhead, daughter of the Geo Soto Noto, a chaste virgin, self-appointed guardian and friend of Lucien. The primary love interest of Dark Schneider, she is the first to use the "virgin's kiss" to awaken Dark. Having undergone priestess training she does not show any magical talent until later in the manga (acting as the party's cleric) and never in the OVA. Despite this, she is the one person that DS fears and (mostly) respects.
She disappeared during the four-year series break, apparently being killed during the fall of King Crimson. In the same time period, a woman with the same appearance and known as "Lilith" appeared alongside the Kings of Hell. She was found near the borders of the Lethe and seems to have some memories about DS.

=== Four Divine Kings ===
Ninja Master Gara (ガラ, Gara)
Voiced by: Tessho Genda (OVA), Hiroki Yasumoto (ONA) (Japanese); Steven Blum (OVA), Aaron LaPlante (ONA) (English)
Gara is a master of Ninjutsu who became a member of the Dark Rebel Army's Divine Generals after impressing Dark in an assassination attempt. He commands a sword which can draw its life force directly from the swordsman, allowing almost unbeatable magic attacks. Unfortunately, the strongest attack is usually fatal to use. When Gara learned of Dark's resurrection, he abducted Yoko and forced Dark to confront him at his keep in a battles that caused them to each lose an arm. Though defeated, Dark wins back Gara's services after restoring his arm and keeping his men alive during the keep's destruction.
Thunder Empress Arshes Nei (アーシェス・ネイ, Āshesu Nei)
Voiced by: Rei Sakuma (OVA), Mami Koyama (drama CD, episodes 1–3), Yōko Hikasa (ONA) (Japanese); Mary Elizabeth McGlynn (OVA), Wendee Lee (ONA) (English)
A half human, half Dark Elf. Her name is a reference to Whitesnake. Kept as a slave by the Wood Elves, she is now raised by Dark as his adopted daughter and eventual lover, following her tribe abandoning her. As one of the Dark Rebel Army's Divine generals and founding members, Nei is well aware of Dark's abilities and revived some ancient magic used by her followers. When Nei's loyalty to the Dark Rebel Army comes to question, she allowed herself to be cursed by Abigail with the spell Accused. When Nei confronts Dark, Lucien's spirit made Dark Schneider aware of what was driving his daughter to attack. DS was outraged and tore out his own heart to drive off the power of the Accused spell (later resurrecting himself). Arshes rejoins him at this point, and they destroy the advancing armies. After learning Kall-su's true colors, she is completely shocked and sad as she saw him as a friend, even though he never treated her and the others as friends.
Kall-Su (カル = ス, Karu Su)
Voiced by: Toshihiko Seki (OVA), Ryo Horikawa (drama CD, episodes 1–3), Shin-ichiro Miki (drama CD, episode 4), Kensho Ono (ONA) (Japanese); Richard Cansino (OVA), Alejandro Saab (ONA) (English)
Kall-Su was the second general of Dark Schneider; he commands the Ice-Falchion, a great sword, and is innately magically powerful. Kall-Su was born in a distant village, persecuted for his father being an Ice-Dragon in human form. It led to him killing his ashamed mother in self-defense and then destroying his village soon after. He was later found and adopted by Dark, treated as an indentured servant. He boasts extreme power and is capable of transforming into an Ice-Dragon at will. He destroys the entire city of Whiteos-Neiki with his spell, Vizkaya, which freezes everyone in the Kingdom into solid ice. After Abigail's defeat, Kall-Su is made into Anthrasax's thrall and used to track down Sheila to Crimson King Glory, but Kall-Su manages to be freed of Anthrasax's influence and joins Dark in facing the being.
Kall, Nei and Gara figure out why "glowing beings of light" have started a war against them via ancient computers in an underground base. They discover that the Apocalypse is fast approaching and the beings of light are in fact angels sent from God to kill a third of mankind (those deemed sinful for worshiping false gods). One of the twelve elves of Europa (riding an abomination looking similar to a behemoth with human feet, and dozens of eyes) sees the three and is angered that they have discovered the reason behind the current events of the earth through his computer system. After calling forth many monsters, they do battle. Before the battle evens starts, however, they discover that their swords are going erupting with energy and seems to have lost their power.
Four years after the battle on earth, Kall-Su is found to be blinded (apparently from the scars over his eyes and face). He says that his power has increased exponentially over the past four years, though he does not know why. It is eventually made clear to him through "The Mysterious Boy" that he is filled with the same power as Elijah and deemed worthy to be his successor. It is also said that he is the "true" king of Metallicana, and will eventually have to do battle with Dark Schneider alongside the "Mysterious Boy". Many people do not believe that he is Elijah's successor, namely the dwarf king Jeloy, who was armed with a mighty ax to repel this fact. He and his men, however, were stopped by Lars, thinking that he was truly Elijah's successor (as he is a well-known hero in the dwarven kingdom). He corrects their statement, saying indeed that Kall is Elijah's successor and was told to do the work of God.
After leaving the dwarf kingdom, Kall-Su decides to go to the world of spirits to seek help and awakes a mighty giant from his frozen slumber. The giant curses him for violating "holy" land and says that he will have to die for his "sins". Kall claims that "death will not be enough to atone for my crimes in this world" and throws a ball of super-condensed water at the giant, throwing his Ice-Falchion at the ball to release a surge of water upon the giant, returning it back to captivity in a pillar of frozen ice. Nei approaches him and tells him that it's not like him to be so rash. The ground begins to rumble and a gigantic gateway appears before the two, Kall claims that he will journey to the realm of spirits to try to ask for help against the upcoming war on Earth. His name is a reference to Kal Swan of the bands Lion and Bad Moon Rising.
Dark Priest Abigail (アビゲイル, Abigeiru)
Voiced by: Ryuzaburo Otomo (OVA), Tomokazu Sugita (ONA) (Japanese); Richard Epcar (OVA), Ray Chase (ONA) (English)
Abigail is a mysterious member of the Dark Rebel Army's Divine generals who appears after Dark's demise fifteen years prior, originally a scientist during the final years of the Old World as a member of Ten Wise Men of Europa who studied spiritual matter and played a role in Anthrasax's creation. After the fall of the Old World, Abigail traveled the new world before joining the Dark Rebel Army to orchestrate his scheme to facilitate Anthrasax's resurrection after ending up in the latter's thrall. He curses Arshes with the Accused spell, which forces her to obey him or her body would be painfully distorted into an immortal toad. He succeeds in breaking the three seals of Anthrasax, personally invading Metallicana while using the three Demonic Treasures. Despite nearly killing Dark's group, Abigail is purged of Anthrasax's influence while his defeat obliterated Metallicana Castle. In the "Requiem of Hell" arc, Abigail concealed himself in a robot body and joined Dark's allies in Iron Maiden as Angus Yarn. Following the angel attack on earth, Abigail converts his spirit into the mainframe grid system of the flying ark King Crimson Glory. There are clues that Abigail may be the "false prophet", the servant of the Antichrist mentioned in The Bible. His name comes from King Diamond's classic album, Abigail.

== Metallicana ==
Lars Ul Metallicana (ラーズ・ウル・メタリカーナ, Rāzu Uru Metarikāna)
Voiced by: Masami Kikuchi (OVA), Yoshitsugu Matsuoka (ONA) (Japanese); Gary Dubin (OVA), Zeno Robinson (ONA) (English)
Lars Ul, whose name is a reference to Lars Ulrich of Metallica, is the prince of the kingdom Metallicana. He is said to be their greatest warrior, due to him having the ability to slay armies of thousands single-handedly. A portion of his power comes from the "blood of dragons" flowing through his veins, giving him the increased vigor, power and speed, as well as the ability to use the "Ki", or spiritual power of the dragon for his attacks. He wields the dragon sword "Heavy Metal", a translucent blade whose destructive can be further augmented by absorbing the "ki" of dragons.
Fifteen years before the story starts, he fought Dark Schneider to a standstill as the latter has conquered most of the world at that point. This forced Lars to kill Dark by using the "Dragon Knight", but Lars is cursed since he used the Dragon Knight to kill Dark instead of its intended quarry, transforming him into a baby dragon with everyone assuming he died defeating Dark.
In the form of a baby dragon, Lars sought to find a successor to the Dragon Knight before he was taken in by Gara as pet and then following Dark despite their history. Lars eventually regains his original form once Dragon Knight was destroyed by Anthrasax, revealing the truth of his curse. During the angel attack, Lars fights on against the angels using the power of the dragon. He is the last to stand his ground (as the Sorcerer Shoguns and Samurai were slain), though he eventually is killed by the higher ranked angels.
Bon Jovina (ボン・ジョヴィーナ, Bon Jobina)
Voiced by: Takkō Ishimori (OVA), Volcano Ōta (ONA) (Japanese); G. Gordon Baer (OVA) (English)
Named after the artist Jon Bon Jovi, Bon Jovina is the unfortunate Captain of the Guard of Metallicana. He is constantly being crushed by enemies, but appears to be quite durable, because he survives being smashed by a Hydra, pummeled by a Minotaur with a giant war hammer, flattened by two walls, and blasted through two walls by the Hurricane Sword. He greatly dislikes Dark but is very loyal to the princess.
Currently, Bon Jovina is in the Halls of Gathering with the other races of half-humans around the world to decide what to do about the upcoming battle.
Sheila Tuel Metallicana (シーラ・トェル・メタリカーナ, Shīra Teru Metarikāna)
Voiced by: Konami Yoshida (OVA), Nao Tōyama (ONA) (Japanese); Bridget Hoffman (OVA) (English)
Princess of Metallicana and Lars's sister, she is strong and determined, but only somewhat magically powerful. She has been taken in by Dark's charms, even going as far as admitting that she "loves" him. She is also revealed to be one of the four seals of Anthrasax, sent away to Crimson King Glory for her safety after the three other seals were destroyed, but she dies during the battle between Dark and Kall-Su, freeing Anthrasax as a result.
King of Metallicana (メタリカーナ王, Metarikāna Ō)
Voiced by: Jōji Yanami (OVA), Binbin Takaoka (ONA) (Japanese); Barry Stigler (OVA), Mick Wingert (ONA) (English)
The current, unnamed, King of Metallicana and father of Prince Lars Ul and Princess Sheila.
Geo Noto Soto (ジオ・ノート・ソート, Jio Nōto Sōto)
Voiced by: Nobuo Tanaka (OVA), Hisashi Izumi (ONA) (Japanese); Simon Prescott (OVA), D.C. Douglas (ONA) (English)
Yoko's powerful cleric father; he transformed and imprisoned Dark in the form of Lucien at the end of the Great War which occurred 15 years before the main storyline. His name appears to reference Jeff Scott Soto, former singer for Yngwie Malmsteen.
Baba (オババ, Obaba)
Voiced by: Tomo Saeki (OVA), Uko Tachibana (ONA) (Japanese); Mari Devon (OVA), Wendee Lee (ONA, season 1), Misty Lee (ONA, season 2) (English)
Baba is an old woman and a fortune teller. She serves and lives in Metallicana. Her magic focuses on divination and prediction of the future, she uses her crystal ball to glimpse future events about to occur. 15 years before the start of the series, Baba helped High Priest Geo Noto Soto create the seal used on Dark Schneider.

== Sorcerer Generals ==
Sean Ari (シーン・ハリ, Shīn Hari)
Voiced by: Wakana Yamazaki (OVA), Ari Ozawa (ONA) (Japanese); Dyanne DiRosario (OVA), Carrie Keranen (ONA) (English)
A war orphan who was raised by and learned High Ancient Magic from Arshes Nei, employing talismans to aid her and becoming one of the three Sorcerer Generals under Arshes' command. After Dark's resurrection was confirmed, Sean Ari was ordered to assassinate him. She attempts to kill Dark by posing as a lord's daughter while using her wiles and virginity, only for the lecherous sorcerer to see through her deception and seduce her into siding with him. Her name references Diamond Head vocalist Sean Harris.
Kai Harn (カイ・ハーン, Kai Hān)
Voiced by: Yuko Kobayashi (OVA), Shizuka Itō (ONA) (Japanese); Debra Jean Rogers (OVA), Kayleigh McKee (ONA) (English)
A wizard-warrior, the second Sorcerer General, she is a master of the ancient Hariken style of swordsmanship and forgotten magic, and her magical skill is greater than Sean's. Dark encountered her in a town where the citizens had been turned to stone, at first mistaking her for a boy with a crush on Ari Sean, and proceeded to taunt Kai with misinformation about Sean's virginity. Using a spell that turned humans into statues, the enraged Kai gained the upper hand in their fight and would have killed Dark, had Ari Sean not interfered and stalled her long enough for Dark to find Yng Wie, the source god of Kai's magic and overpower it with the power of his patron god, Black More. On the verge of defeat, Kai summoned a cockatrice to petrify both Dark and Ari Sean, only to have victory snatched away as she was injured by the cockatrice when she lost the means to control it. Dark helped "care for" her wound against her will, seducing and winning her in the process. Her name references Kai Hansen, former singer of Helloween and leader of Gamma Ray.
Di-Amon (ダイ = アモン, Dai Amon)
Voiced by: Shigeru Chiba (OVA), Takehito Koyasu (ONA) (Japanese); Kevin Seymour (OVA), Bill Butts (ONA) (English)
The third Sorcerer General, a vain wizard who turned himself into a vampire before joining the Dark Rebel Army, able to resurrect himself as a bat before recreating his human body. He sought the power to overthrow Arshes Nei and Kall-Su by drinking the blood of many virgins, encountering Yoko's group when a werewolf in his service is killed by Dark Schneider as Lucien and learning enough of Dark's seal to quickly capture him, Yoko and Larz. Ari Sean and Kai Harn allowed themselves to be captured to save Dark, only for Di-Amon to bite Kai and injure Yoko when she comes to Sean's aid. This provokes Dark to forcefully manifest without a virgin's kiss, proceeding to defeat Di-Amon by exposing him to sunlight and inflicting his bat form with the Accused curse to force him into his service. He is modeled after metal legend King Diamond, even showing, in the OVA, a love of music, singing and face paint.

== Iron Maiden ==
Harris (ハリス, Harisu)
Voiced by: Seiyu Fujiwara (ONA)
The King of Iron Maiden before its destruction. He is seen crying over the loss of his lands to Abigail's undead armies before being killed by the undead himself.
Mercy (マーシ, Māshi)
Voiced by: Shinya Takahashi (ONA) (Japanese); Xander Mobus (ONA) (English)
The prince of the Kingdom of Iron Maiden. son of the deceased King Harris, and the lord of the Samurai.
Marie (マリー, Marī)
Voiced by: Arisa Kiyoto (ONA) (Japanese); Dawn M. Bennett (ONA) (English)
The wife of the Samurai warrior Schen Karr, she was a priestess in the Samurai order. Among her duties was protecting the cursed Soul Eater sword. Sometime before the start of the series Marie was murdered by her husband's brother Zion so he could steal the Sword Eater sword. Marie's death drove Schen to a lifelong quest of revenge against his brother.

=== Samurai ===
Joshua Belahia (ヨシュア・ベラヒア, Yoshua Berahia)
Voiced by: Takuma Terashima (ONA) (Japanese); Todd Haberkorn (ONA) (English)
From a prestigious samurai family, he earned the title of Samurai Master at a young age and was a skilled instructor at Mifune's dojo. He is strongly proud to be a samurai and is unwilling to do anything that is out of line with loyalty or civility. His special attack is the "Butterfly Dance Ashura Strike". He seems to care about Kai Harn. His name references American Guitarist Joshua Perahia.
Nils Sean Mifune (ニルス・ショーン・ミフネ, Nirusu Shōn Mifune)
Voiced by: Show Hayami (ONA) (Japanese); Mick Wingert (ONA) (English)
Like Priest Geo, he is one of the Five Heroes of Metallicana who fought in the Golem War, attracted by the aspirations of Prince Lars. Later, he became the Seneschal of the Iron Maiden. He is a master of the Kyokushin Itto style and his class is Samurai High Master. Joshua is one of his disciples. His name references Neal Schon and Toshirō Mifune.
Schen Karr (シェン・カー, Shen Kā)
Voiced by: Ryuichi Kijima (ONA) (Japanese); Andrew Kishino (ONA) (English)
The samurai second in command with the style called "Shadow School", the assassination swords which forbids the use of magic. His ultimate attack is said to make the recipient lose sight of the sword, and it is rumoured that his prowess as a swordsman even surpasses that of Joshua. His favourite sword is Kuroyasha, a demon blade which has black blade. He is said to have an avenger for his late wife among the Twelve Sorceror Shoguns. His name references to Rudolf and Michael Schenker.
Vai Staebe (ヴァイ・ステアベ, Vuai Suteabe)
Voiced by: Taito Ban (ONA) (Japanese); Sean Chiplock (ONA) (English)
One of the Samurai. He is the youngest in the High Master's entourage and his swordsmanship is inexperienced, but his rigidity makes him the No. 3 samurai. He is also skilled in enchantment magic. She has a crush on Yoko, and is aware of her rivalry with Dark Schneider. Her mother lives in a samurai house. His name references American Guitarist Steve Vai.
Jorg Fishes (ヨルグ・フィシス, Yorugu Fishisu)
Voiced by: Jun Kasama (ONA) (Japanese); A.J. Beckles (ONA) (English)
Brown-skinned samurai centurion. He is a user of the quippo, a body art combined with swordsmanship. He is also ambidextrous and can change his stance at will. He is a righteous and just man. A close friend of Joshua. His name references Jörg Fischer.
Hammet (ハメット, Hammetto)
Voiced by: Shōmaru Zōza (ONA) (Japanese); Cedric Williams (ONA) (English)
One of the Samurai. He is small, wears glasses and wears clothes that are not samurai-like, but he has a high capacity for tactical planning and is not in the front line but serves as a close adviser to Mifune and as a general staff member of the rebel army. His name references Kirk Hammett of Metallica.
Mohi (モヒ)
Voiced by: Seiyu Fujiwara (ONA) (Japanese); Edward Bosco (ONA) (English)
One of the Samurai and a friend of Vai. It is unclear whether he is called "Mohi" because of his Mohawk head or because of his name.
Angus Yarn (アンガス・ヤーン)
One of the Samurai. He is a gifted writer and is said to be good at willow and haiku. His body is one size larger than that of the Sorcerer Shogun Vlad, and his weapon of choice is the giant crossed spear "Zambo Trident". He is very quiet and is regarded as a mysterious presence by his comrades. His name references Angus Young.

== Sorcerer Shoguns ==
Yngwei von Malmsteen (イングヴェイ・フォン・マルムスティーン, Inguvuei fon Marumusutīn)
Voiced by: Junichi Suwabe (ONA) (Japanese); Chris Hackney (ONA) (English)
A calm and noble swordsman. He is one of the most powerful warlords of the Sorcerer Shogun, and his devotion to Kall-Su is particularly strong. His special technique, the Banisher of Night Emperor Sword, which he performs with his Shu Tora Sword "Stra", is a blow of such speed that it appears to ordinary people as a momentary flash of light. Hence, he is known as the user of the "Speed of Light Strike". The name is an obvious reference to metal guitarist Yngwie Malmsteen.
Zion Sol Vandenverg (ジオン・ゾル・ヴァンデンヴァーグ, Jion Zoru Vuandenvuāgu)
Voiced by: Kōji Yusa (ONA) (Japanese); Christopher Swindle (ONA) (English)
One of the Sorcerer Shogun. A mage equipped with the Black Renegade, an armour forged with negative power, and the "Soul Eater", a black demon blade. He seems to have a history with a certain samurai.
McAlpine Tony Strauss (マカパイン・トーニ・シュトラウス, Makapain Tōni Shutorausu)
Voiced by: Jun Fukuyama (ONA) (Japanese); Ryan Colt Levy (ONA) (English)
A Demonic Garrotter who manipulates specially forged metallic threads called Demonic slicing threads. These threads cut through everything and can stretch for kilometres, so they can be stretched in all directions to form wards. He also uses the Garian Sword, the sword of sinners that dissipates magical defences. He is a victory supremacist who also favours cunning methods.
Shella E. Lee (シェラ・イー・リー, Shera Ī Rī)
Voiced by: Asami Seto (ONA) (Japanese); Anairis Quiñones (ONA) (English)
The last one to join the Sorceror Shogun. She is a bard and by casting the nature magic, the claws of her hands become magic claws that can cut through rocks. The music she plays on her lyre brings confusion and death to those who listen to it. She is looking for a messiah to save the world, which is in turmoil like hemp, and believes it is Kall-Su.
Ba Thory (バ・ソリー, Ba Sorī)
Voiced by: Minoru Hirota (ONA) (Japanese); Dave B. Mitchell (ONA) (English)
A polymancer who keeps hundreds of millions of bugs inside his body. The types of bugs he carries in his body are diverse, including regenerating bugs that repair themselves and blood-sucking bugs as well as bugs that strengthen his own abilities such as sensing and augmentation. Like McAlpine, he sees Yngwie, the first of the Sorcerer Shogun, as his rival. He is also characterised by his hot and bitter behaviour.
Ran Di Rhodes Stein Neubauten (ラン・ディ・ローズ・シュタイン・ノイバウテン, Ran Di Rōzu Shutain Noibauten)
Voiced by: Daisuke Hirakawa (ONA) (Japanese); Landon McDonald (ONA) (English)
A swordsman from a mercenary background, his main weapon is the Fire Whip. He and his close friend Yngwie are said to be the best of the Twelve Sorcerer Shoguns in terms of skill. He is the only one of them with a shield. He is said to have a history with Kai Harn and Sean Ari.
Sykes von Snowwhite (サイクス・フォン・スノーホワイト, Saikusu fon Sunōhowaito)
Voiced by: Atsushi Tamaru (ONA) (Japanese); Landon McDonald (ONA) (English)
Scholarly mage. He has a thirst for knowledge and is erudite, but also has a nervous disposition. He carries a rapier, but his main method of attack is to create a fault line in space with his sword and cut through the target, which cannot be protected by armour or shield. He follows Kall-Su out of his own ambition.
Ross Zaboss Friedrich (ロス・ザボス・フリードリッヒ, Rosu Zabosu Furīdorihhi)
Voiced by: Wataru Komada (ONA) (Japanese); Xander Mobus (ONA) (English)
A magical swordsman who uses gravity to crush opponents with his sword. He is from a noble family, but for one reason or another, he has lost his position as a gladiator, while he also has the ability to open locks, and is full of mysteries. He loves jewels and hates words such as friendship and trust.
Bol Gil Bol (ボル・ギル・ボル, Boru Giru Boru)
Voiced by: Takahiro Fujiwara (ONA) (Japanese); Edward Bosco (ONA) (English)
A shadow master from a remote tribe who has inherited the magical power to manipulate shadows at will. He has the temperament of a warrior who recognises the strength of even his enemies. He wears black armour with sharp knife-shaped spikes and carries a poison sword as his weapon.
Zakk Walder (ザック・ワルダー, Zakku Waruda)
Voiced by: Tomohiro Yamaguchi (ONA) (Japanese); Chris Hackney (ONA) (English)
A martial artist who has mastered the legendary fighting martial art known as Karate, he is capable of unleashing hundreds of fists per second. His weapon of choice is the Sonic Sword, a pair of small swords with two blades that reach the speed of sound. Along with Shella, he is the youngest of the Sorcerer Shogun.
Ida Deesna (イダ・ディースナ, Ida Dīsuna)
Voiced by: Taisuke Nakano (ONA) (Japanese); Dave B. Mitchell (ONA) (English)
His class is the Demon World Illusionist. Also called Summoner because he is able to summon creatures from the demon world with two crystal balls from their waists. His weapon of choice is the Iron Fan. he is characterised by his large physique and the make-up on her face, which is not unlike that of a summoner.
Vlad Kills (ブラド・キルス, Burado Kirusu)
Voiced by: Hinata Tadokoro (ONA) (Japanese); Mick Lauer (ONA) (English)
One of the Sorcerer Shoguns. He boasts a massive frame of nearly three metres and wears a huge chainmail and full plate armour. With his monstrous strength, he wields a weapon that is a combination of a warhammer and a greataxe. Because of the way he fights, he is nicknamed a walking tank, despite being a knight.

== Angels ==
Michael (ミカエル, Mikaeru)
One of the four great seraphs. She controls the attribute of "fire". Estimated level is around 400,000. She is a beautiful brown-skinned woman. She possesses the fiery divine sword Levertine. She is an Archangel, and she has the highest power among Seraphs. She admired Lucifer, the former Archangel, and she still remembers him. She thinks of D.S. as a "vulgar person", but she senses something similar to Lucifer in him, and she seems confused.
Gabriel (ガブリエル, Gaburieru)
One of the four great seraphs. She controls the attribute of "water". Estimated level is around 300,000. She is a young and beautiful woman. She possesses the thunder hammer Mjolnir. She is so young in appearance and personality that one does not feel the dignity of a seraph, but on the contrary, she has ample large breasts. During the Great Destruction, she was defeated by Satan in the war, and she was forced to fall into heaven and was imprisoned in hell for 400 years. After being rescued from her hell by D.S., her perception of humans changes and she shows D.S. her understanding.
Uriel (ウリエル, Urieru)
One of the four great seraphs. He controls the attribute of "earth". Estimated level is around 200,000. He is a dignified-looking man. He possesses the divine spear Gungnir. His personality is honest, full of a sense of justice, and serious. As a result of Beelzebub's trap, Beelzebub kills his sister Amriel for the sake of God's justice, and his spirit cannot bear the guilt he feels towards himself and the idea of immorality towards God, so he falls down from heaven. He used to be one of the four great angels, but he became a devil of a higher rank than the Seven Great Demon Kings, and clashed with Satan. D.S. After a fierce battle to the death, he becomes even more insane, his power goes out of control, and while he collapses, the sealed Augoeides is released and regenerates and restores himself, and is reunited with D.S., who has summoned the dragon warrior. After reuniting with Amriel, who was revived and resurrected by D.S., his very existence disappeared as compensation for his fall from heaven.
Raphael (ラファエル, Rafaeru)
One of the four great seraphs. He controls the attribute of "wind". Estimated level is around 200,000. He is an intelligent man with long hair. He gave Mjolnir to Gabriel, so his current equipment is unknown. He has a gentle and intelligent personality, but he sometimes shows a thoughtful side. There are almost no fighting scenes in the story, and his role is mainly as a Kyogen performer and an explanator of the situation. Also, in the final chapter of the Immoral Laws, after the battle between D.S. and Uriel, he takes mysterious actions such as going to Beelzebub alone.
Amriel (エプロン, Amurieru)
She was Uriel's younger sister and also served as his deputy. She was captured during the battle when Satan attacked, and her body was fused with Conlon's to become a catalyst for "null resonance." In the past, she supported her older brother Uriel when he was infected with "black cancer", and the bond between her siblings is deep. She also seems to be childhood friends with Uriel and the other three of the Four Archangels, and Gabriel calls her Am-chan. Conlon and his friends were thought to have disappeared after being eaten by D.S., but their spirits and bodies were rebuilt within D.S.'s body and they were revived.

== Demons ==
=== Demon Gods ===
Efreet (イーフリート, Īfurīto)
Voiced by: Seizō Katō (OVA), Tsuguo Mogami (ONA) (Japanese); Bob Papenbrook (OVA), Todd Haberkorn (ONA) (English)
A demon god spirit residing on the Plane of Fire, one of the Four Elemental Planes. He has appeared in the human world a few times, usually as a demon sword in desert temples.
Anthrasax (アンスラサクス, Ansurasakusu)
Voiced by: Mami Koyama (ONA) (Japanese); Misty Lee (ONA) (English)
Known as the God of Destruction, Anthrasax was created from an angel by scientists, magicians and alchemists to put an end to all conflict, but Anthrasax acted on her own will and deemed humanity unfit to exist as she carried out a planet-wide genocide before she is defeated by the Dragon Knight in the battle that reshaped the world, buried under what became the Judas kingdom. However, Anthrasax exploits the Dark Rebel Army after Dark's defeat, infecting Abigail and later Kall-Su with some of her cells and influenced them to break the four seals that held her in place. Nevertheless, she eventually breaks free and sends Dark to Hell.

=== High-ranking Demons ===
Satan (サタン, Satan)
A high-ranking demon who can be considered the foremost antagonist of the series because of the role he plays prior to the events of the story. Previously, he was an angel known as Satanël, ranked second among the Seraphs, who rebelled against God and was banished from Heaven alongside his elder brother, Lucifer. In the current timeline, Satan plans to enact "Negative Genesis", which involves the destruction of the universe being remade in the likeness of demons.
Porno Dianno (ポルノディアノ, Poruno Diano)
A high-ranking demon who serves as the Generalissimo of Hell and the Right Hand of The Demon King Satan, She appeared in front of D.S., who had defeated the high-ranking demon gods brought by Satan, in the third layer of Tolomare in Cocytus, the ninth realm of hell. As a local deity, she is not well thought of by the demon kings. She pushes D.S. with overwhelming force. She is a devil in the form of a beautiful woman with an outstanding figure, and D.S. calls her the "Big Breasts Grand Marshal". Due to the interruption of "Crime and Punishment", the outcome of the battle with D.S. was not shown, but it is being revealed in "The Mark of Magic".
Conlon (コンロン, Konron)
A demon that appeared in "The Law of Corruption/Mmorality" story. He calls himself a "gentleman from hell." He is a Viscount-class fallen angel, and his level is approximately 13,000. Originally, its power is far from that of the Seraphs, but it is able to repel all of the attacks of the Seraphs using the Void Howling technology that nullifies the power of angels, created through human research. brought the angel army to the brink of destruction. Although he once dispersed D.S.'s body, he was cornered by D.S. who revived and excited "Judas Pain" in parallel, and although he released his dark body "Augoeides" and fought, he was defeated. In the end, he was eaten by the giant mouth in the abdomen of D.S., who had turned into a demon, and died. He has a younger sister who is a higher rank than him.
Beelzebub (ベルゼバブ, Beruzebabu)
A high-ranking demon and leader of The Seven Demon Princes from Hell. Through various speculations and deceptions, he moved D.S. and the four great seraphs, and drove Uriel into fallen heaven. His true purpose remains unknown. His estimated Level is over 1 million.
Astaroth (アスタロト, Asutaroto)
A high-ranking demon and one of The Seven Demon Princes from Hell. In the current timeline, she plays a support role in Satan's "Negative Genesis" plan.
Asmodeus (アスモデウス, Asumodeusu)
A high-ranking demon and one of The Seven Demon Princes from Hell. He is known to rarely speak, to the point the other Demon Princes wonder if he is asleep.
Bael (バエル, Baeru)
A high-ranking demon and one of The Seven Demon Princes from Hell. He has a plump, plump body and calls himself "Pokchin".
Bilt (ビルト, Biruto)
A high-ranking demon and one of The Seven Demon Princes from Hell. She has a powerful demon lord with ancient and forbidden magics. She is a demon-like succubus who enjoys seducing mortals with promises of physical pleasure or access to her forbidden spells, then slowly devouring their souls to fuel her own immortal power.
Paimon (パイモン, Paimon)
A high-ranking demon and one of The Seven Demon Princes from Hell. She has a brainy and childish personality. She likes Lilith.
Belial (ベリアル, Beriaru)
A high-ranking demon and one of The Seven Demon Princes from Hell. He is thought to have the second highest rank among the seven great demons after Beelzebub, but he does not think well of Beelzebub. He is easily angered and has a rough tone. Among the demon kings, he often plays the role of Tsukkomi.

== Other characters ==
Osborn (オズボーン, Ozubōn)
Voiced by: Shintarô Ôhata (ONA) (Japanese); Christopher Swindle (ONA) (English)
A wizard who led the initial attack on Metallicana. He was later killed in battle by Dark Schneider.
Kevidubu (ケビダブ, Kebidabu)
Voiced by: Masaru Ikeda (OVA), Tōru Nara (ONA) (Japanese); Kirk Thornton (OVA), Ray Chase (ONA) (English)
He calls himself Kall's talented apprentice. He takes Hydra with him and invades Metallicana, but because he makes a small wound on D.S.'s face, D.S. curses him and suddenly kills him.
Werewolf (狼男)
Voiced by: Akihiro Tajima (ONA) (Japanese); Dave B. Mitchell (ONA) (English)
A servant of the vampire Di-Amon.
Jodoh (ジョドー, jodō)
Voiced by: Kazuya Saji (ONA)
A minion of the vampire Di-Amon. He is killed during this battle when Di-Amon mistakenly hits him with the Assassin spell, believing he had attacked Dark Schneider.
Cavadale (カバディールデ, Kabadīrude)
Voiced by: Shōmaru Zōza (ONA)
The Prince of Kingdom of Whytos Neiki. He was frozen by Kall-Su while attacking his kingdom to obtain the seal for Anthrasax.
Doshi (ドシ, Doshi)
Voiced by: Yasuhiro Mamiya (ONA) (Japanese); Joe Ochman (ONA) (English)
A self-proclaimed super famous genius dead man under Abigail. He appears at Metalicana with his own Lynch and undead cyclops. Although he does not fight himself, he does gouge children's eyeballs with a knife in order to gather fresh "materials" to make undead.
Vivian (ビビアン)
Voiced by: Hayato Kaneko (ONA)
A cyclops from Abigail's undead army.
Lynch (リンチ, Rinchi)
Voiced by: Takahiro Sumi (ONA)
The leader of the zombie army.
Lich (リッチー, Ritchī)
Voiced by: Atsushi Miyauchi (ONA) (Japanese); Edward Bosco (ONA) (English)
One of the four Eddies and is the master of the undead and the most powerful member of Abigail's undead legion. He also carries the third of the Three Demonic Treasures, the Satan's Ring.
Piron (ピロ, Piro)
Voiced by: Shōmaru Zōza (ONA) (Japanese); Mick Lauer (ONA) (English)
A weretiger, Piron has the body of a man, with the head, and fur patterns, of a tiger. He is a servant of the vampire Di-Amon.
Maron (茶色)
Voiced by: Shinya Takahashi (ONA) (Japanese); Zeno Robinson (ONA) (English)
A werewolf, Maron has the body of a man, and the head and fur of a wolf. He is a servant of the vampire Di-Amon.
Dani A'motte Arve Firange Clayd (ア'モット・アールヴ=フィランジ・クレイド子爵・ダニ, Amotto Āruvu Firanji Kurei Do Shishaku Dani)
A princess of elves. Her class is Summoner and her level is 1500. She is around 200 years old. As a representative of the Elf race, she visits the Pan-Human Union. Due to her ability to summon the Void Gods, she has the power to destroy even the dark bodies of demon gods.
Jeloy Bjohrn (イエロィ・ビヨ〜ン, Ieroi Biyon)
The king of the dwarves. His class is Warlord and his level is 990. He has been acquainted with the Five Heroes since the Magic Soldier War, and has a close relationship with Geo Note Sort. He has the virtues of a king, but he also has the greedy side of a dwarf.
Alexi Laiho Chil Bo Do (ア'レキシ・ライホ・チル・ボ・ド, Arekishi Raiho Chiru Bo Do)
The prince and chief priest of Hobbits. He has a strong sense of justice, but is a womanizer.
Yanne Wino Chio Bo Do (ヤンネ・ウィノ・チル・ボ・ド, Yan'ne Uino Chiru Bo Do)
The princess of Hobbits, and younger sister of Alexi.
