= Bangalore Choir =

American rock band

- Genres: Hard rock, glam metal, heavy metal
- Years active: 1991–1992, 2010–present
- Labels: Giant, AOR Heaven
- Members: Curt Mitchell; David Reece; Danny Greenberg; Andy Susemihl; Rene Letters
- Past members: Ian Mayo; Jackie Ramos; John Kirk; Hans in 't Zandt

Bangalore Choir is an American hard rock band formed in 1991. It was formed by former Accept frontman David Reece and guitarists Curt Mitchell and John Kirk (both formerly of Razor Maid). Joining them from Hericane Alice, was bassist Ian Mayo and former Bad Boy drummer Jackie Ramos future members of the band Bad Moon Rising with Whitesnake/Dio guitarist Doug Aldrich and Lion/Tytan vocalist Kal Swann. Their debut album, On Target, was produced by Max Norman, and featured songs co written by Jon Bon Jovi and Aldo Nova. Despite having big names involved, the album was not a success and the band split up.

Mayo and Ramos moved on to the band Bad Moon Rising. Mayo also continued with the band Burning Rain. Reece formed the band Sircle of Silence before moving on to a solo career and singing with various bands like Gypsy Rose and Wicked Sensation. Curt Mitchell now is a guitar teacher in Nevada and has his own guitar site.

In 2010, talks of a reunion resurfaced with Reece being the driving force. John Kirk, Ian Mayo, and Jackie Ramos declined offers to join the band again, but Curt Mitchell accepted, as well as original bassist Danny Greenberg. These three original members, along with new guitarist Andy Susemihl (formerly of U.D.O.) and drummer Hans in 't Zandt, made a new Bangalore Choir album in spring and summer of 2010, called Cadence. The album was released in September 2010 through German label AOR Heaven.

In November 2011, David Reece's Facebook page stated vocals were completed on a new Bangalore Choir album. This new album, Metaphor, was released in April 2012.

== Members ==
=== Current ===
- David Reece – lead vocals (1991–1992, 2010–present)
- Curt Mitchell – guitars (1991–1992, 2010–present)
- Andy Susemihl – guitars (2010–present)
- Danny Greenberg – bass guitar (1991, 2010–present)
- Rene Letters – drums (2012–present)

=== Former ===
- John Kirk – guitars (1991–1992)
- Ian Mayo – bass guitar (1991–1992)
- Jackie Ramos – drums (1991–1992)
- Hans in 't Zandt - drums (2010–2012)

== Discography ==
=== Studio albums ===
- On Target (1992)
- Cadence (2010)
- Metaphor (2012)
- Center Mass (2023)
- Rapid Fire Succession: On Target Part II (2025)
- Payload (2026)

=== Live albums ===
- All or Nothin' – Live at Firefest (2011)

=== Promotional EPs ===
- Selections from On Target (1992)

=== Compilation albums ===
- All Or Nothing - The Complete Studio Albums Collection (2021)
- Beyond Target (2022)

== Sources ==
- Band biography at SleazeRoxx.com
