= Jerry Best (bassist) =

- Born: Gerard John Best; May 8, 1963 (age 63); Queens, New York, United States
- Genres: Rock and roll, hard rock, heavy metal
- Occupations: Musician, songwriter, composer
- Instrument: bass
- Years active: 1984–present
- Labels: Scotti Brothers, Virgin
- Website: Official Jerry Best Website

Gerard John "Jerry" Best (born May 8, 1963 in Queens, New York) is a Los Angeles-based hard rock bassist, songwriter and composer, active since 1984. He has played with bands such as Lion, Dio, Freak of Nature and Heavy Bones. Jerry was first introduced to his instrument by his older brother Tom, who showed him how to play the basic chords.

The most well-known works Best has played in include the theme song for the Transformers movie and the album Power Love with the band Lion. Over the years, Jerry has worked together with artists like Doug Aldrich, Mike Tramp, Courtney Love, Joel Ellis, Frankie Banali and Chuck Wright.

== Personal life ==
Jerry was born in 1963 as the second child to the Best family. At that time, his family was living in Flushing Meadows in the borough of Queens in New York.

His family moved often after the job of Jerry’s father, and he ended up living in seven states during the first 18 years of his life. When he was around ten years old, his older brother Tom started teaching Jerry some chords, initially with an electric guitar and later with a bass. Soon, they formed a band called Zeus, and played mostly at school and other local events.

Later, after graduating from high school, Jerry moved to Los Angeles, where his father and mother had already moved. In Los Angeles, Jerry played with bands such as T-zer and Mansfield, (with Tom, Pete Preston (RIP) & Doug Aldrich).

== Equipment ==
Best is currently endorsed by Seymour Duncan and Hipshot. He also uses products from Dunlop, ESP, GK, Fender and Ampeg. One of his previously used bass guitars is currently on display at the Hard Rock Cafe in Moscow.

== Discography ==
=== Mansfield ===
- 1983: Overdrive, Gonna Rock You

=== Lion ===
- 1986 – Power Love
- 1987 – The Wraith/movie soundtrack
- 1987 – The Transformers: The Movie (Original Motion Picture Soundtrack)
- 1987 – Dangerous Attraction
- 1989 – Trouble in Angel City

=== Freak of Nature ===
- 1992 – Freak of Nature
- 1993 – Rescue Me
- 1994 – Gathering of Freaks
- 1998 – Outcasts
- 2002 – Freakology

=== Dio ===
- 1996 – Angry Machines

=== Mike Tramp ===
- 1997 – Capricorn
- 2004 – Songs I left behind

=== Courtney Love ===
- 2004 – America's Sweetheart
- 2004 – Fly (Japanese only)
- 2005 – The Simple Life Soundtrack

=== Other works ===
- 2000 – Ken Korade, KGB Records
- 2002 – Tracy G, Tracy G records
- 2003 – The SURGE, KGB Records
- 2013 – Manny Charlton, Hellacious, 4818 Records
- 2015 - Chillin Sun, w/Kenny Kanowski (RIP)
- 2017 - Tongues of Fire w/Sean Colligan & Dave "Chuch" Chuchian
