= Trouble in Angel City =

Studio album by Lion
- Released: June 12, 1989
- Recorded: 1988
- Studio: Sound City Studios (Van Nuys, California)
- Genre: Hard rock, heavy metal, glam metal
- Length: 43:53
- Label: Grand Slamm
- Producer: Lion

Lion chronology
Dangerous Attraction (1987)	Trouble in Angel City (1989)

Singles from Trouble in Angel City
- 1. "Lock Up Your Daughters" Released: 1989

Trouble in Angel City is the second and final studio album released by American rock band Lion. A month after this album release, Lion disbanded.

After this, ex-Lion musicians Kal Swan and Doug Aldrich co-founded Bad Moon Rising.

The album was remastered and reissued on CD in 2020 by the French label Bad Reputation. This version adds the 1986 Powerlove EP.

== Track listing ==
No.	Title	Writer(s)	Length
1.	"Come On"	Swan, Aldrich	5:58
2.	"Lock Up Your Daughters" (Slade cover)	Noddy Holder, Jim Lea	3:36
3.	"Can't Stop the Rain"	Swan, Aldrich	3:41
4.	"Love Is a Lie"	Swan	4:44
5.	"Victims of Circumstance"	Swan	3:52
6.	"Stranger in the City"	Swan, Aldrich	5:17
7.	"Hungry for Love"	Swan	4:25
8.	"Hold On"	Swan	4:04
9.	"Lonely Girl"	Swan, Aldrich	1:42
10.	"Forgotten Sons"	Swan, Aldrich	5:47
Total length:			43:53

== Personnel ==
Lion

- Kal Swan – lead vocals
- Doug Aldrich – guitars, backing vocals
- Jerry Best – bass, backing vocals
- Mark Edwards – drums, backing vocals

Additional musicians

- Rick Seratte – keyboards, programming, backing vocals
- Scott MacLachlan – backing vocals
- Victoria Seeger – female vocals

== Production ==
- Lion – producers
- Alan Isaacs – engineer, mixing
- Greg Fulginiti – mastering at Artisan Sound Recorders (North Hollywood, California)
- Kal Swan – logo design, cover concept
- Emily Keifer at Jupiter Design – artwork
- Anna Maria DeSanto – front cover photography
- Toshimasa Matano – back cover photography
