= Dare to Be Stupid (song) =

1986 single by "Weird Al" Yankovic

Single by "Weird Al" Yankovic

from the album The Transformers: The Movie (Original Motion Picture Soundtrack) and Dare to Be Stupid
- A-side: "The Touch"
- Released: August 1986
- Recorded: January 3, 1985
- Genre: New wave; synth-pop; parody
- Length: 3:23
- Label: Scotti Brothers
- Songwriter: "Weird Al" Yankovic
- Producer: Rick Derringer

"Weird Al" Yankovic singles chronology
"Hooked on Polkas" (1985)	"Dare to Be Stupid" (1986)	"Living with a Hernia" (1986)

Music video
- "Dare to Be Stupid" on YouTube

"Dare to Be Stupid" is an original song by American comedy musician "Weird Al" Yankovic, which appeared on the 1985 album of the same name. It is a musical pastiche of the new wave band Devo, with lyrics that encourage the listener to go against common idioms and perform other acts of stupidity. In 1986, the song was released as a double A-side single alongside "The Touch" by Stan Bush; both songs were included in the soundtrack for The Transformers: The Movie.

== Lyrics and style ==
Dare to Be Stupid is a stylistic parody of new wave band Devo, replicating the band's lyrics and musical style.

Lyrically, the song encourages the listener to be stupid in various ways; mostly by advising them to do the opposite of common idioms (e.g. "let the bedbugs bite" or "put all your eggs in one basket"), with the occasional absurd non sequitur (e.g. "stick your head in the microwave and get yourself a tan"). The song also encourages the listener to "...let your babies grow up to be cowboys," a reference to a popular country song, to "squeeze all the Charmin you can while Mr. Whipple's not around," a reference to a long-running series of ads, and to "sit around the house and watch Leave It to Beaver", a reference to the television show of the same name.

After completing the song in 1985, Yankovic played it for Devo's co-founder, lead vocalist and keyboardist Mark Mothersbaugh. In 2024, Yankovic recalled, "I'm not sure how honest of a reaction I got, but he seemed to enjoy it. And in fact he complimented me. He said he really liked the sounds we got on the synthesizers." In a 1999 interview on VH1's Behind the Music, Mothersbaugh stated in reaction to the song that: "I was in shock. It was the most beautiful thing I had ever heard. He sort of re-sculpted that song into something else and... I hate him for it, basically." Yankovic said Mothersbaugh's response in the program was not serious, and was representative of his dry sense of humor.

== Music video ==
The music video is, according to Yankovic, also a "style parody" of Devo's works:

Yankovic and his band wear the yellow radiation suits from Devo's cover of the Rolling Stones' "(I Can't Get No) Satisfaction" video throughout. Many of the performance segments of the video are modeled on the "Satisfaction" music video, including the man trying to breakdance on a carpeted wall and floor. This is a parody of dancer Craig Allen Rothwell, nicknamed "Spazz Attack", who was featured in Devo's video with his signature flip onto his back.

Segments of the video are reminiscent of several of Devo's other videos:

- "Devo Corporate Anthem" – In one scene, the band is standing in the same pose as Devo.
- "Jocko Homo" – In another segment, the band wears nylon stockings over their heads.
- "Beautiful World" – There are also several scenes of black-and-white stock footage, directed by Al (wearing a costume different from the one he wore in the rest of the video) in front of an Interocitor. In addition, "tell me, what did I say?" also resembles the line from this song, and the aforementioned costume resembles the one worn on stage by Mark Mothersbaugh (as Booji Boy) when Devo performed the song live during their tour for Oh, No! It's Devo in 1982.
- "Time Out for Fun" – The scenes where they come together and sing the main chorus is similar to where Devo comes together in the music video for this song and sings their main chorus.
- "Come Back Jonee" – In one scene, the elderly men dressed up in cowboy suits are reminiscent of the elderly men bowling in the "Come Back Jonee" video.
- "The Day My Baby Gave Me a Surprize" – In this part the group passes in front of very simple computer graphics on a blue screen while playing their instruments.
- "Freedom of Choice" – The use of stop-motion animation and computer graphics is also reminiscent of this Devo video. The use of Roman togas also comes from "Freedom of Choice", and at one point, a man must choose between a banana and an accordion - in Devo's original, it is a gun or a grenade.
- "Whip It" – The guitarist is alone, wearing a cowboy outfit (although the guitarist wearing a cowboy outfit was from the music video to the theme from the film Doctor Detroit, which Devo performed, it is likely a coincidence, as the set was based on the "Whip It" video). There are cowboys in the "Whip it" video as well.
- "Love Without Anger" – The scene in which the lyrics "you can just give up the ship" is displayed on a screen mimics the display of the lyrics "love without anger isn't love at all" in the Devo video.
- In addition, the scene of moving Mr. Potato Heads is reminiscent of a sequence in a Devo video shown at the start of live performances during their New Traditionalists tour and other subsequent tours, in which Mr. Potato Head figures emulate a concert crowd. Likewise, the woman signing lyrics mirrors a portion of the same video.
- A General Boy lookalike makes an appearance with three other generals, all wearing orange traffic safety cones on their heads while standing around a battlefield map.

The video also includes much bizarre imagery, which, for the most part, is irrelevant to the lyrics, such as Yankovic's face emerging from a screen filled with tiny baby figurines (a nod to the similarly Devo-esque scene in the video of "Mexican Radio" from early 1980s band—and friend of Devo's—Wall of Voodoo, when lead vocalist Stan Ridgway's face emerges from a bowl of cooked pinto beans).

The machine Yankovic controls during parts of the video is an interocitor from the film This Island Earth.

The swim goggles Yankovic wears over his eyes resembles those of Devo vocalist Mark Mothersbaugh's in the "Satisfaction", "The Day My Baby Gave Me a Surprise" and "Come Back Jonee" videos.

The scenes in the video are supposedly taking place in a man's dream.

== In popular media ==
The song has an ongoing relationship with the Transformers franchise, spanning both television and film. The song was featured in The Transformers: The Movie in 1986, appearing during a battle scene featuring the characters Wreck-Gar and the Junkions. It was subsequently released as a double A-side along with "The Touch" by Stan Bush. In a 2011 interview with The A.V. Club, Yankovic said that he believed The Transformers brought more exposure to the song than his own album did.

Yankovic would later guest star in the 2007 TV series Transformers: Animated as a new version of Wreck-Gar, who makes an allusion to the song in his dialogue ("I am Wreck-Gar! I dare to be stupid!"). Transformers tribute band The Cybertronic Spree covered the song, shooting a music video for their version which referenced other Yankovic videos in addition to the original; Yankovic himself appears at the end of the video. The song also appears in the 2024 Amy Adams movie Nightbitch. "Dare to Be Stupid" was also featured in the book The Illustrated Al: The Songs of "Weird Al" Yankovic, adapted and illustrated by cartoonist Hilary Barta.

== Track listing ==
1. "The Touch" – 3:54
2. "Dare to Be Stupid" – 3:23

== Personnel ==
- "Weird Al" Yankovic – lead and backing vocals, keyboards, synthesizers
- Steve Jay – bass guitar
- Jim West – electric guitar
- Jon "Bermuda" Schwartz – acoustic and electronic drums
- Pat Regan – additional synthesizer

== See also ==
- List of songs recorded by "Weird Al" Yankovic
- Sapere aude
