= Cobra (1986 film) =

1986 film by George P. Cosmatos

- Theatrical release poster by John Alvin
- Directed by: George P. Cosmatos
- Screenplay by: Sylvester Stallone
- Based on: Fair Game by Paula Gosling
- Produced by: Menahem Golan; Yoram Globus
- Starring: Sylvester Stallone; Brigitte Nielsen; Reni Santoni
- Cinematography: Ric Waite
- Edited by: James R. Symons; Don Zimmerman
- Music by: Sylvester Levay
- Production company: The Cannon Group
- Distributed by: Warner Bros.
- Release date: May 23, 1986
- Running time: 89 minutes
- Country: United States
- Language: English
- Budget: $25 million
- Box office: $160 million

Cobra is a 1986 American action film directed by George P. Cosmatos and written by Sylvester Stallone, who stars in the title role. The film, loosely based on the 1974 novel A Running Duck by Paula Gosling (later published as Fair Game and filmed under that title in 1995), co-stars Reni Santoni, Brigitte Nielsen and Andrew Robinson. Cobra follows Los Angeles police Lt. Marion "Cobra" Cobretti, who investigates a string of violent crimes and also protects Ingrid Knudsen, a witness targeted by the perpetrators.

Cobra is the final film which featured the collaboration between Stallone and Nielsen after Rocky IV (1985) until Creed II (2018), and the only film the pair are both featured in while married to one another in real life, before their divorce a year later. The script was largely inspired by Stallone's original script for Beverly Hills Cop (1984).

Cobra was released to generally negative reviews with criticism on its excessive violence and overuse of genre tropes, but it was a box office success and has since been considered a cult classic.

== Plot ==
When a mass shooting at a Los Angeles supermarket evolves into a hostage crisis, the Los Angeles Police Department (LAPD) summons Lieutenant Marion "Cobra" Cobretti of their elite "Zombie Squad" to resolve the incident. Cobretti confronts the shooter, who espouses social Darwinist ideals and mentions a "New World"; Cobretti kills him before he can execute a group of hostages. Detective Monte reprimands Cobretti for disregarding police procedure, and Cobretti admonishes a group of reporters for not prioritizing the safety of the victims.

Unbeknownst to the authorities, the supermarket incident is part of a string of violent crimes committed by the New World, a cult that despises modern society and believes in killing the weak, leaving only the strongest and smartest to rule. Ingrid Knudsen, a local model and businesswoman, becomes the New World's priority target after she witnesses the group and their leader, the "Night Slasher", on a killing spree. Knudsen is placed under the protective custody of Cobretti and his partner Sergeant Tony Gonzales following an attempt on her life.

After more attempts to kill Knudsen and Cobretti, Cobretti theorizes that an organization is behind this, but his theory is rebuffed by his superiors. Cobretti and Gonzales leave with Knudsen to the small town of San Remos, where Cobretti and Knudsen fall in love. Nancy Stalk, an LAPD officer and New World's second-in-command, infiltrates the police escort.

At dawn, the New World arrives in San Remos on motorcycles and besieges the town on Stalk's instructions. In a shootout, Cobretti kills many cultists, but Gonzales is wounded. Cobretti and Knudsen flee in a pickup truck, which the cultists wreck with a roadblock. The pair flee to a steel mill, where Cobretti defeats the rest of the cultists and Stalk is accidentally shot by the Night Slasher.

Cobretti fights with the Night Slasher in hand-to-hand combat and impales him on a hook that drags him into a furnace. The California Highway Patrol secures San Remos and rescues Gonzales. As Cobretti is cleared by his superiors, Monte initially appears apologetic, only to again chastise Cobretti for "overdoing it", prompting Cobretti to punch Monte in the face before riding away with Knudsen on a motorcycle.

== Cast ==
- Sylvester Stallone as Lieutenant Marion "Cobra" Cobretti
- Brigitte Nielsen as Ingrid Knudsen
- Reni Santoni as Sergeant Tony Gonzales
- Andrew Robinson as Detective Monte
- Brian Thompson as "Night Slasher"
- John Herzfeld as Cho
- Lee Garlington as Officer Nancy Stalk
- Art LaFleur as Captain Sears
- Marco Rodriguez as Supermarket Killer
- Ross St. Phillip as Security Guard
- Val Avery as Chief Halliwell
- David Rasche as Dan
- Nick Angotti as Prodski

== Production ==
=== Development and writing ===
When Sylvester Stallone was signed to play the lead Axel Foley in Beverly Hills Cop, he decided to rewrite the script almost completely, removing nearly all the comedic aspects and turning it into an action movie that he felt was better suited to him. The studio read his revised script and rejected it. The proposed action scenes would have increased the budget far beyond what they planned. Stallone later channeled his ideas for it into an original script. When Stallone left Beverly Hills Cop, Eddie Murphy was brought in to play the lead role.

The novel A Running Duck (which was also published as Fair Game) by Paula Gosling was cited as source material, enough so that she received a screen credit. Stallone's earlier draft of the script contained many differences from later drafts and the final film. These include the opening shootout taking place in a movie theater (instead of a supermarket), during which many more people are killed; Marion "Cobra" Cobretti mentioning how he had a girlfriend who was killed by a psychopath he was trying to catch; an additional nighttime action sequence on a boat where Cobra and Ingrid Knudsen are hiding and are attacked by the Night Slasher's cultists, with Cobra and Tony Gonzales managing to kill them all; and a different ending, in which Monte, revealed to be the actual leader of the New World, attempts to kill Ingrid at the last second before being killed by Cobretti. Stallone stated that he saw his character as "Bruce Springsteen with a badge."

The line, "This is where the law stops and I start, sucker!", was inspired by a line spoken by Boon Hogganbeck (Steve McQueen) in The Reivers. Cobra needed much additional editing because the film was so graphically violent that it originally received an X rating. It was edited to receive an R rating.

=== Casting ===
Brian Thompson auditioned seven times before he was hired. On the fourth audition he met Stallone, who thought that Thompson was too nice to play the Night Slasher. But after a screen test, he immediately got the job. Also, in the original script, the Night Slasher was called Abaddon, possibly after the "angel of the abyss" from the Bible. Thompson repeatedly sought Stallone's advice about how to play the Night Slasher, including questions about his background and personal motivations, but Stallone showed no interest in the subject and told Thompson that the character was simply evil. In an unfortunate surprise for Thompson, after filming was completed, director George P. Cosmatos unexpectedly told him: "You could have been good if you had listened to me."

Stallone acknowledged Dirty Harry as an influence and Cobra reunited two actors from the film: Reni Santoni and Andy Robinson. Brigitte Nielsen, Stallone's then-wife who he had met filming Rocky IV, was cast as Ingrid Knudsen.

=== Filming ===
Originally, Cobra was supposed to be filmed in Seattle, climaxing with a motorcycle chase scene on a ferry between the islands. Even though everything was prepared to start filming the final theatrical version of the scene at night, Stallone demanded the ending be changed because of the mosquito problem at that time, which would have made night time filming very difficult to endure.

The supporting cast and extras were forbidden from talking to Stallone on set. At one point during filming, Stallone complained to cinematographer Ric Waite that they were falling behind and that he needed to push his crew to work harder. Waite responded by telling Stallone that the delays were due to his fooling around with Nielsen and showing off for his bodyguards. Although Stallone was shocked that somebody would talk to him that way, he cleaned up his act and behaved more professionally, although he returned to his old egocentric behavior a few weeks later. Waite later said in an interview that, despite his huge ego, Stallone had a great sense of humor. He said Cosmatos would have made a great producer, but he was a terrible director.

During a stunt scene, driver Kerry Rossall and another stuntman were injured after Rossall intentionally crashed a van into a wall. Nielsen was nearly hit by the van during a previous take. For the Night Slasher's monologue in the lead-up to the final fight, Thompson did the scene with the script supervisor standing in for Stallone, who was busy watching a basketball game on TV.

The custom 1950 Mercury driven by Cobretti was actually owned by Sylvester Stallone. The studio produced stunt doubles of the car for use in some of the action sequences, such as the jump from the second floor of the parking garage. The production built three "Cobra cars" for stunt work. Although they were identical on the outside, their moving parts were designed for specific sequences, involving high-speed swipes with other vehicles, 180-degree turns, jumps, and 360-degree spins.

The knife used by the Night Slasher was made for the film by knife designer Herman Schneider. Sylvester Stallone asked Schneider to create a knife that audiences would never forget. Cobretti uses a custom Colt Gold Cup National Match 1911, modified to chamber 9×19mm Parabellum. Later in the film, he uses a Jatimatic submachine gun.

=== Editing ===
The first rough cut was over two hours long (the closest estimated original running time is 130 minutes). It was then shortened to a roughly two-hour director's cut which was intended to be released in theaters. However, after Top Gun became a smash hit, Stallone and Warner Bros. Pictures were worried that Cobra—which would premiere the following week—would be overshadowed, so in order to ensure at least one extra screening each day the movie was heavily re-edited. Stallone removed much of the plot and scenes involving characters other than his own. Warner Bros. also demanded that the more graphic scenes be cut down or removed entirely because they were "too intense," and that some action scenes be cut for pacing. The extended television version of the film is approximately 6 minutes longer than the theatrical release. When first submitted to the MPAA the film received an X rating, necessitating even more cuts.

== Music ==
Original Motion Picture Soundtrack

Soundtrack album by various artists
- Released: 1986
- Genres: Rock, pop
- Length: 37:56
- Label: Scotti Bros. Records
- Producer: Robin Garb

The musical score was composed by Sylvester Levay. An audio cassette and vinyl version were released on September 21, 1986, followed by a CD which was released in 1992 as the Original Motion Picture Soundtrack.

Stan Bush's song "The Touch", heard in The Transformers: The Movie (1986), was originally written for Cobra. It is said "Feel The Heat" was overheard during the filming of its music video by Jean Beauvoir when they were editing in the same building complex, and was added because Stallone loved the song.

No.	Title	Music	Length
1.	"Voice of America's Sons (Theme From Cobra)"	John Cafferty & The Beaver Brown Band	4:36
2.	"Feel the Heat"	Jean Beauvoir	4:01
3.	"Loving on Borrowed Time (Love Theme from Cobra)"	Gladys Knight & Bill Medley	3:59
4.	"Skyline"	Sylvester Levay	3:24
5.	"Hold on to Your Vision"	Gary Wright	3:44
6.	"Suave"	Miami Sound Machine	3:03
7.	"Cobra"	Sylvester Levay	3:09
8.	"Angel of the City"	Robert Tepper	4:28
9.	"Chase"	Sylvester Levay	3:31
10.	"Two into One"	Bill Medley & Carmen Twillie	4:01
Total length:			37:56

== Reception ==
=== Box office ===
Cobra opened the widest for a Warner Bros. release at the time opening on 2,131 screens and debuted at number one at the U.S. box office with a Memorial Day weekend debut of $15.7 million. It eventually went on to gross $160 million, over six times its estimated $25 million budget. According to The New York Times, the film was still considered a disappointment because its $48 million at the box office in the US did not live up to the success of Rambo.

=== Critical response ===
On Rotten Tomatoes, the film has an approval rating of 24% based on 25 reviews. The website's consensus reads, "A disengaged Sylvester Stallone plays the titular Cobra with no bite in this leaden action thriller, queasily fixated on wanton carnage and nothing else." On Metacritic, the film has a weighted average score of 25 out of 100 based on 9 critics, indicating "generally unfavorable" reviews. Audiences polled by CinemaScore gave the film a grade "B" on scale of A to F.

TV Guide stated that "Stallone's character is an empty hulk...the few attempts to provide us with little insights into his character are downright laughable." Nina Darnton of The New York Times opined that the film "pretends to be against the wanton violence of a disintegrating society, but it's really the apotheosis of that violence....[it] shows such contempt for the most basic American values", and Vincent Canby called it "disturbing for the violence it portrays, the ideas it represents and the large number of people who will undoubtedly go to see it and cheer on its dangerous hero." Sheila Benson of the Los Angeles Times panned the film, saying "Cobra's pretentious emptiness, its dumbness, its two-faced morality make it a movie that begs to be laughed off."

Variety called it "a sleek, extremely violent and exciting police thriller" and compared Cobra favorably to Rocky Balboa and John Rambo.

Gene Siskel of the Chicago Tribune compared Cobra to Dirty Harry when giving the film 2 and 1/2 stars and summarizing it as Filthy Harry. He wrote: "Whereas Clint Eastwood simply would have squinted at Robinson, Stallone takes a more violent approach. Maybe that's the difference between actors--Eastwood can be droll; Stallone more often crosses the border to primeval." Siskel and Roger Ebert did not give the film a feature review on their series At the Movies, but both gave it negative attention during a late-1986 segment on new video releases, in which Siskel noted that the film had a great opening sequence (the supermarket hostage scene) and couldn't maintain the momentum. Ebert lamented that Stallone was squandering his talent and vast potential.

In the 1996 movie guide Seen That, Now What?, the film was given the rating of "C−", stating that the film is "a graceless vigilante thriller that's strictly for hardcore action junkies."

Then-U.S. President Ronald Reagan viewed this film at Camp David on June 6, 1986.

=== Accolades ===
Cobra was nominated for six Golden Raspberry Awards, including Worst Picture, Worst Actor (Stallone), Worst Actress (Brigitte Nielsen), Worst Supporting Actor and Worst New Star (both for Thompson) and Worst Screenplay (Stallone).

Director Nicolas Winding Refn is a fan of Cobra. In Refn's cult film Drive the main character The Driver (Ryan Gosling) has a toothpick in his mouth in some scenes; this is Refn's homage to the opening scene where Cobra has a matchstick in his mouth. Gosling also said in interview that he is a fan of Stallone and Cobra which is why he "borrowed" his character's toothpick habit from Cobra.

== Video game ==
In 1986, the film was made into a video game by Ocean Software for the ZX Spectrum, Commodore 64, and Amstrad CPC.

== Cancelled sequel ==
In 1987, Cannon Films, along with Warner Bros. attempted to make a sequel, Cobra Part II, but the film never materialized.

== Television series ==
In 2019, a television series was in development with Robert Rodriguez serving as director/creator. As of 2025, it is not known if this project is still in development.

== See also ==
- List of American films of 1986
- 1986 in film
- Sylvester Stallone filmography
