= The Transformers: The Movie =

1986 film by Nelson Shin

- Theatrical release poster
- Directed by: Nelson Shin
- Screenplay by: Ron Friedman; Flint Dille (Note: Dille is only credited as "story consultant", but he wrote the final versions of the film with help from other writers.)
- Based on: The Transformers by Hasbro and Takara
- Produced by: Joe Bacal; Tom Griffin
- Starring: Eric Idle; Judd Nelson; Leonard Nimoy; Robert Stack; Lionel Stander; Orson Welles
- Cinematography: Masatoshi Fukui
- Edited by: David Hankins
- Music by: Vince DiCola
- Production companies: Sunbow Productions; Marvel Productions; Toei Animation
- Distributed by: De Laurentiis Entertainment Group (United States); Nippon Herald Films (Japan)
- Release dates: August 8, 1986 (United States); August 9, 1989 (Japan)
- Running time: 85 minutes
- Countries: United States; Japan
- Language: English
- Budget: $6 million
- Box office: $11 million

The Transformers: The Movie is a 1986 animated science fiction action film based on the Transformers television series. It was co-produced and directed by Nelson Shin, who also produced the television series, and written by Ron Friedman. It was released in North America on August 8, 1986, and in the UK on December 12.

The story is set in 2005, 20 years after the TV series' second season. The plot follows the heroic Autobot robots, who are hunted by Unicron, a planet-sized Transformer. The film features the voices of Eric Idle, Judd Nelson, Leonard Nimoy, Casey Kasem, Robert Stack, Lionel Stander, John Moschitta Jr., Scatman Crothers, Peter Cullen, Frank Welker, and Orson Welles, who died ten months before the film's release, in his final film role. The soundtrack comprises electronic music composed by Vince DiCola and songs from rock and heavy metal acts including Stan Bush and "Weird Al" Yankovic.

Hasbro, the owner of Transformers, demanded the film introduce new characters for its toyline, at the protest of some creators of the film and TV series. The decision to kill off multiple established characters prompted outcry from fans and a letter-writing campaign. On release, The Transformers: The Movie received generally negative reviews from critics and grossed $5.8 million against a budget of $6 million, becoming a box-office failure. Over time, perceptions of the film improved and it gained a cult following, with re-releases over time bringing its lifetime gross to over $10.9 million.

== Plot ==
In 2005, the evil Decepticons, led by Megatron, have conquered the Transformers' home planet of Cybertron. The heroic Autobots, operating from Cybertron's two moons, prepare a counteroffensive. To fuel it, the Autobot leader, Optimus Prime, sends a shuttle to Autobot City on Earth for supplies. The Decepticons discover their plan and hijack the ship, killing the crew in the process.

Near Autobot City, Hot Rod fishes with Daniel Witwicky (son of Spike). Daniel spots a hole in the hijacked shuttle; Hot Rod sees the Decepticons and attacks, and the Decepticons leap into battle. Optimus arrives with reinforcements and engages Megatron in combat. Prime is able to defeat Megatron, though he is mortally wounded in the process. The beaten Decepticons retreat to space in Astrotrain. Before he dies, Optimus bequeaths the Matrix of Leadership to Ultra Magnus, passing it to Hot Rod who passes it to Magnus, telling them that its power will light the Autobots' darkest hour.

To conserve fuel, the Decepticons jettison their wounded, including Megatron, who is thrown out by Starscream. Drifting in space, the wounded Decepticons are found by Unicron, a planet-size Transformer who consumes other worlds. Unicron offers Megatron a new body in exchange for destroying the Matrix, which has the power to destroy Unicron. Megatron reluctantly agrees and is remade into Galvatron, while the other jettisoned Decepticons are converted into his new armada. Galvatron returns to Cybertron, kills Starscream and retakes command of the Decepticons. Unicron consumes Cybertron's moons, including a secret base where some other Autobots and Spike are stationed.

Galvatron leads his forces to seek out Ultra Magnus at the ruined Autobot City. The surviving Autobots escape in separate shuttles, which are shot down by the Decepticons and crash on different planets. Hot Rod and Kup are taken prisoner by the Quintessons, tyrants who hold kangaroo courts and always execute their prisoners. Hot Rod and Kup learn of Unicron from Kranix, the lone survivor of a planet Unicron devoured. After Kranix is executed, Hot Rod and Kup escape, aided by the Dinobots and the small Autobot Wheelie, who helps them find an escape ship.

The other Autobots land on the Planet of Junk, where they decide to use the junk to repair the ship. Realizing the Matrix still exists, Galvatron and his forces arrive; Ultra Magnus secures the remaining Autobots but fails to release the Matrix's power. Galvatron destroys him and seizes the Matrix, which he intends to control Unicron with. The Autobots find Ultra Magnus' body and the native Junkions attack them. The arriving Autobots from Quintessa befriend the Junkions, who in return rebuild Ultra Magnus. Realizing Galvatron now has the Matrix, the Autobots and the Junkions fly to Cybertron. Galvatron attempts to threaten Unicron, but cannot activate the Matrix. In response, Unicron transforms into a colossal robot and begins to dismember Cybertron. When Galvatron attacks him, Unicron swallows him and the Matrix whole.

The Autobots arrive at the scene while Unicron continues to battle Decepticons, Junkions, and other defenders of Cybertron. Hot Rod's ship is damaged and he and his group of Autobots crash into Unicron's left eye. Daniel finds his father in Unicron's digestive system and saves him and the other swallowed Autobots. Galvatron attempts to ally with Hot Rod, but Unicron forces him to attack. During the fight, Hot Rod reaches out and activates the Matrix, becoming Rodimus Prime, the new Autobot leader. Rodimus tosses Galvatron into space and uses the Matrix's power to destroy Unicron, then escapes with the other Autobots through Unicron's remaining eye. With the Decepticons in disarray, the Autobots celebrate the war's end and the retaking of their home planet while Unicron's severed head orbits Cybertron.

== Cast ==
- Judd Nelson as Hot Rod/Rodimus Prime, a headstrong, cavalier Autobot warrior unknowingly destined to unleash the power of the Matrix
- Peter Cullen as:
  - Optimus Prime, the Autobots' highly intelligent and courageous leader
  - Ironhide, Optimus's battle-tested bodyguard, and Autobot security specialist
- Lionel Stander as Kup, a gruff, elderly Autobot warrior and mentor to Hot Rod
- Robert Stack as Ultra Magnus, an elite soldier who takes Optimus's place as the Autobot leader and the bearer of the Matrix of Leadership
- Orson Welles as Unicron, a planet-sized giant Transformer and villainous cosmic entity capable of devouring planets, the movie's main antagonist
- Frank Welker as:
  - Megatron, the merciless Decepticon leader
  - Soundwave, the loyal Decepticon communications officer
  - Frenzy, a Decepticon warrior, one of Soundwave's cassettes
  - Rumble, a Decepticon demolitions officer, one of Soundwave's cassettes
  - Wheelie, a diminutive robot survivor who befriends Grimlock and who only speaks in rhyme
  - Scrapheap, a youthful and rebellious Junkion
- Leonard Nimoy as Galvatron, the reborn form of Megatron
- Susan Blu as Arcee, a highly skilled female Autobot warrior
- Neil Ross as:
  - Springer, a cocky Autobot aerial defence specialist and Triple Changer who transforms into a car and a helicopter
  - Bonecrusher, the Constructicon bulldozer and demolitionist
  - Hook, the Constructicon crane truck and surgical engineer
  - Slag, the Dinobot triceratops and flamethrower
- Gregg Berger as Grimlock, the powerful but dimwitted Dinobot leader
- Christopher Collins (credited Chris Latta) as Starscream, the Decepticons' conceited air warrior and Megatron's deputy
- Dan Gilvezan as Bumblebee, a young, loyal Autobot scout and espionage specialist
- Paul Eiding as Perceptor, the Autobots' resident scientist
- Buster Jones as Blaster, the boisterous Autobot communications officer
- John Moschitta Jr. as Blurr, a fast-talking Autobot data courier who is the fastest of the Autobots
- Eric Idle as Wreck-Gar, an eccentric Transformer and leader of the Junkions
- Casey Kasem as Cliffjumper, a daring and impulsive Autobot warrior
- Michael Bell as:
  - Prowl, Autobot military strategist
  - Scrapper, leader of the Constructicons, tractor shovel and construction engineer
  - Swoop, friendly Dinobot Pteranodon and bombardier
  - Junkyard, the public face of the Junkions
- Corey Burton as:
  - Spike Witwicky, Daniel's engineer father and longtime Autobot ally
  - Brawn, tough and macho Autobot demolitions expert
  - Shockwave, the Decepticon military operations officer who transforms into a laser pistol
- David Mendenhall as Daniel Witwicky, a young human teenager and Autobot ally who is the son of Spike Witwicky
- Arthur Burghardt as Devastator, the combined form of the Constructicons and the Decepticons' most powerful warrior
- Scatman Crothers as Jazz, the indispensable right-hand man to Optimus Prime, Autobot special operations
- Walker Edmiston as Inferno, the brave, gun-slinging Autobot firetruck, search and rescue
- Hal Rayle as Shrapnel, stag beetle and leader of the Insecticons, electronic warfare specialist
- Clive Revill as Kickback, the charming, but cruelly clever Insecticon grasshopper, espionage
- Stanley Jones as Scourge, a merciless hunter and leader of the Sweeps created from the remains of Decepticon warrior Thundercracker
- Ed Gilbert as Blitzwing, the Decepticon military transporter, a Triple Changer who can transform into a fighter jet and a tank
- Jack Angel as Astrotrain, the Decepticon ground and air commando, a Triple Changer who can transform into a space shuttle and a locomotive
- Bud Davis as Dirge, fearful Decepticon jet fighter and warrior
- Don Messick as Gears, the anti-social, self-proclaimed misfit Autobot transport and reconnaissance
- Norman Alden as Kranix, the last survivor of the consumed planet Lithone
- Roger C. Carmel as:
  - Cyclonus, Galvatron's most loyal soldier and deputy
  - The Quintesson leader
- Regis Cordic as the Quintesson Judge
- Victor Caroli as the narrator

== Development ==
=== Writing ===
The Transformers television series began broadcasting in 1984 to promote the Transformers toys by Hasbro. The Transformers: The Movie was conceived as a commercial tie-in to promote the 1986 line of toys. The TV series featured no deaths, and the writers assigned familial identities to characters for children to associate with. However, Hasbro ordered that the film kill off several existing characters to refresh the cast.

The director, Nelson Shin, recalled: "[Hasbro] created the story using characters that could best be merchandised for the film. Only with that consideration could I have freedom to change the storyline." The screenwriter, Ron Friedman, who had written for the TV series, advised against killing the Autobot leader, Optimus Prime. He said in 2013: "To remove Optimus Prime, to physically remove Daddy from the family, that wasn't going to work. I told Hasbro and their lieutenants they would have to bring him back but they said no and had 'great things planned'. In other words, they were going to create new, more expensive toys."

According to the screenwriters, Hasbro underestimated the extent to which Prime's death would shock the young audience. The story consultant Flint Dille said: "We didn't know that he was an icon. It was a toy show. We just thought we were killing off the old product line to replace it with new products. ... Kids were crying in the theaters. We heard about people leaving the movie. We were getting a lot of nasty notes about it. There was some kid who locked himself in his bedroom for two weeks." Optimus Prime was subsequently revived in the TV series. A scene in which Ultra Magnus is drawn and quartered was scripted and storyboarded, but replaced with a scene of him being shot. Another unproduced scene would have killed "basically the entire '84 product line" in a charge against the Decepticons.

=== Production ===
The budget was $6 million, six times greater than that of the equivalent 90 minutes of the TV series. Shin's team of almost one hundred personnel normally took three months to make one episode of the series, so the extra budget did not help the considerable time constraints from the concurrent production of both the film and TV series.

The Toei Animation vice president, Kozo Morishita, spent one year in the United States during production. He supervised the art direction, insisting the Transformers be given several layers of shading and shadows for a dynamic and detailed appearance. Shin conceived of Prime's body fading to grey to show that "the spirit was gone from the body".

The Transformers: The Movie was the final film featuring Orson Welles. Welles spent the day of October 5, 1985, performing Unicron's voice on set, and died on October 10. Slate reported that his "voice was apparently so weak by the time he made his recording that technicians needed to run it through a synthesizer to salvage it". He also read his lines so slowly that the audio had to be shortened to speed it up about eight percent. Shin said that Welles had originally been pleased to accept the role after reading the script and had expressed an admiration for animated films. Shortly before his death, Welles told his biographer, Barbara Leaming, "You know what I did this morning? I played the voice of a toy. I play a planet. I menace somebody called Something-or-other. Then I'm destroyed. My plan to destroy Whoever-it-is is thwarted and I tear myself apart on the screen."

== Soundtrack ==
Stan Bush's song "The Touch" is prominently featured in the film, having been originally written for the Sylvester Stallone film Cobra (1986). A remix is featured in the 2012 video game Transformers: Fall of Cybertron; the song is featured in the 2018 film Bumblebee. The soundtrack includes "Instruments of Destruction" by NRG, "Dare" by Stan Bush, "Nothin's Gonna Stand in Our Way" and "Hunger" by Kick Axe (credited as Spectre General), "Dare to Be Stupid" by "Weird Al" Yankovic, and a hard rock remake of the Transformers TV theme song by Lion.

== Release ==
The Transformers: The Movie was released on August 8, 1986, to 990 screens in the United States, grossing US$1,778,559 (equivalent to about $5,224,000 in 2025) on opening weekend. It opened at 14th place behind About Last Night, which had already been in theaters for five weeks. Its final box office gross of $5,849,647 (equivalent to $17,181,000 in 2025) made it the 99th-highest-grossing film of 1986. In that year, Hasbro lost a total of $10 million on its two collaborations with the one-year-old and serially failing film distribution company, De Laurentiis Entertainment Group (DEG): My Little Pony: The Movie and then The Transformers: The Movie. Box office returns were booming across the industry, but several other small young distribution companies were similarly failing due to bulk production of many cheap films. Furthermore, The Transformers: The Movie was reportedly "lost in an already-crowded summer lineup" which included Short Circuit, Ferris Bueller's Day Off, Labyrinth, Big Trouble in Little China, The Karate Kid: Part II, Aliens, Howard the Duck, Stand by Me, Flight of the Navigator, and The Fly.

The Transformers: The Movie was released in the UK on December 12, 1986, through Rank Film Distributors. This release added two sets of narrations: one explaining the story in the beginning, including an opening crawl similar to that of Star Wars', and one in the ending ensuring viewers that Optimus Prime would return. In Japan, it was initially released on LaserDisc in 1987, and had a theatrical release through a charity showing on August 9, 1989.

=== Later releases ===
Across the decades, The Transformers has become a cult classic, which yielded a remastering, several home media re-releases, and more theatrical screenings. In September 2018, the film was screened for one night in the United States, in 450 (later increased by 300, totaling 750) theaters.

==== The Apology Tour ====
In 2026, Hasbro commemorated the film's 40th anniversary with an "apology tour". Its marketing overall revolved around the death of Optimus Prime. In August, Optimus Prime voice actor Peter Cullen passed away, prompting a change to the marketing. The re-release was supported with a newly-scored soundtrack and new toys. Fathom Events announced that they would re-release the film beginning on September 17, 2026, and lasting through September 21, 2026. It was also announced that the re-release would include an original 12-minute animated short entitled Optimus Prime: Awakening. The short, which was animated by The Third Floor, Inc., features Peter Cullen's final, posthumous performance as Optimus Prime (Note: Cullen's last theatrical film as the character prior to his passing was Transformers: Rise of the Beasts (2023).) along with Frank Welker returning to voice Megatron.

In the United States and Canada, the re-release was booked in 1,454 theaters; previews grossed $1.05 million, placing it second behind holdover Practical Magic 2. It went on to overperform, grossing $3.1 million, ranking seventh and placing third out of the new releases for the weekend of September 18-20. The re-release had grossed $5 million, taking its lifetime gross to $10.9 million. Becoming the distributor's third-highest grossing 2026 title, behind The Amazing Digital Circus: The Last Act and a 25th-anniversary re-release of The Lord of the Rings: The Fellowship of the Ring (2001), Fathom was satisfied with its overperformance, with theaters extending the film up to October 7.

=== Home media ===
The film was animated in 4:3 "fullscreen" format, and the trailer promises "spectacular widescreen action". The feature was vertically cropped to widescreen dimensions for theatrical showings and on certain home media releases and released in fullscreen on VHS, DVD, and Blu-ray. Newer releases, like Shout! Factory's 35th-anniversary edition, are formatted in fullscreen. Earlier home releases commonly edited out two instances of swearing.

==== United States ====
The film was originally released on VHS and Betamax by Family Home Entertainment in February 1987 with a suggested retail price of $79.95. It debuted at #12 on the Billboard Top Kid Video Sales top 25 chart and remained on the list for the at least 40 weeks.

Later releases include Rhino Home Video, who released the film on VHS in 1999. This version uses the UK master which has scrolling text and narration at the beginning to replace the cast credits, and an additional closing narration assuring viewers that "Optimus Prime will return." This narration was present in the British theatrical release. The company released the film on DVD on November 7, 2000, with a newly remastered print based on the US version, and restores Spike's swear. It was distributed exclusively in Canada by Seville Pictures.

Following Rhino's home video rights to Sunbow's catalog expiring, Sony Wonder released a two-disc 20th-anniversary special edition on November 7, 2006. This release featured a brand-new widescreen remaster of the film, in addition to the original fullscreen version. The extras include several audio commentaries, newly produced behind-the-scenes featurettes, storyboards, commercials, and an episode from Transformers: Victory – "Scramble City: Mobilization". However, it only features audio commentary.

Shout! Factory holds the rights to the movie as with the television series, and releases anniversary editions of the movie. The company released a 30th-anniversary edition on Blu-ray and DVD on September 13, 2016. Shout! Factory released a 35th-anniversary edition on 4K Ultra HD Blu-ray on August 3, 2021. A 40th-anniversary edition was released on November 17, 2026, with a Dolby Vision print accompanied by a new Dolby Atmos soundtrack in addition to numerous bonus features, including the Optimus Prime: Awakening short presented during The Apology Tour theatrical screenings.

The film grossed $29.4 million in domestic DVD and Blu-ray home sales.

==== United Kingdom ====
The film was initially released on VHS in September 1987 by Video Gems. This print of the film uses the same master used for the UK theatrical release but excludes the swear words. The film was re-released in February 2000 by Maverick Entertainment.

Maverick would release the film on DVD in November 2001, which once again used the UK print, but used the sound master from the US DVD, which restores Spike's swear. It features an episode of the Transformers: The Headmasters anime as a bonus, alongside the theatrical trailer and a picture gallery. This version was later released on VHS in April 2002, which also contains the Headmasters episode. Afterwards, the home video rights transferred over from Maverick to Metrodome Distribution after TV-Loonland AG's purchase of a stake in the company.

In March and June 2003, Prism Leisure released a budget DVD release of the film. Metrodome Distribution released a "reconstructed" version of The Transformers: The Movie in September 2005, which featured a newly remastered version of the film that exposed the entire visible picture from the film's negative. The film was also released on UMD the following month.

In June 2007, Metrodome Distribution released an "Ultimate Edition" two-disc of the movie, one month prior to the release of the live-action Transformers film, which featured the same remastered widescreen print from the Sony Wonder release on Disc 1, alongside the UK version on Disc 2. Its extras include many from the Remastered edition, plus fan commentary, a fan-made trailer, interviews with Peter Cullen and Flint Dille, and the "Scramble City" OVA. This was followed up with a UMD reissue and a Blu-ray release in October 2007. This release uses an upscaled version of the 2006 widescreen remaster print, although it lacks bonus features.

In December 2016, Manga Entertainment released the 30th Anniversary Edition as a limited-edition Blu-ray steelbook, and released the standard edition on DVD and Blu-ray a year later. This release uses the same master and prints from the US Shout! Factory release, being released under license from the company. Funimation UK later reissued the Blu-ray and released the movie on 4K Blu-ray in October 2021, once again using the same prints and masters from the Shout! Factory release.

==== Japan ====
A year after the film's original release, it was released on LaserDisc by Hillcrane. In the 1990s, it was released in Japan on LaserDisc and VHS. On January 25, 2001, Pioneer LDC released the film on Region 2 DVD with Japanese and English audio (which was presented in the UK version). That release is no longer in print.

The film will be released in Japanese theaters nationwide on November 27, 2026.

== Reception and legacy ==
=== Contemporary reception ===
The day after release, Caryn James of The New York Times wrote: "While all this action may captivate young children, the animation is not spectacular enough to dazzle adults, and the Transformers have few truly human elements to lure parents along, even when their voices are supplied by well-known actors." Scott Cain of the Atlanta Constitution reported a "packed theater", but complained that "as a jaundiced adult", he "never had the slightest clue as to what was taking place" even after consulting several excited children (who assured him it did not make sense for them either, but "who loved it anyway") and the four-page studio synopsis (which he could not reconcile with what he had seen). He was disappointed that he couldn't identify the voices of several famous actors and concluded that "non-stop action is sufficient for kiddie audiences but ... I am offended that The Transformers is a 90-minute toy commercial. Even worse, it paints a future in which war is incessant. The only human child among the characters is in tears almost constantly."

In The Ottawa Citizen, Richard Martin wrote: "It's everything you'd expect from a Saturday morning cartoon blown up to feature length and designed to sell more toys to more kids. [... Unicron is] a monster planet that consumes everything in its path, just as the movie seems set to do." Jack Zink of South Florida Sun Sentinel called Transformers: The Movie "a wall-to-wall demolition derby for kids ... an animated, heavy-metal comic book [with a] maddeningly simple story ... The art and graphics may be substantially more complex than the TV series but the net visual result is less impressive than most viewers have a right to expect. ... Not bad for what it is, but not much in the face of precedents like Heavy Metal (1981) and Fritz the Cat (1972)." He said most of its characters are descended from Mad Max and Luke Skywalker, and "have learned the art of the civil insult". In a review later published in his Movie & Video Guide, the film historian Leonard Maltin gave Transformers: The Movie the lowest possible rating and wrote that The Transformers: The Movie was "little more than an obnoxious, feature-length toy commercial...That deafening rock score certainly doesn't help."

=== Retrospective reception ===
On the review aggregator website Rotten Tomatoes, 68% of 28 critics' reviews are positive. The website's consensus reads: "A surprisingly dark, emotional, and almost excessively cynical experience for Transformers fans." In 2007, John Swansburg of Slate wrote, "Though a modest film compared with Michael Bay's blockbuster [Transformers (2007)], the original Transformers is the better film ... [T]here's nothing even approaching the original's narrative depth." He recalled the film giving him a new curse word and childhood trauma: "Only in our scariest nightmares would we have imagined that a mere 20 minutes into the movie, Optimus Prime, the most beloved of Autobots, would be killed ... It just blew me away. Witnessing death on that scale was [...] every bit as shocking as War of the Worlds had been for Grandma and Grandpa."

Gabe Toro of CinemaBlend wrote in 2014: "... Transformers: The Movie otherwise provides the sort of chase-heavy thrills that comes from robots that can become cars. Contrast that with Michael Bay's vision, where the robots basically abandon their transforming skills to have endless, violent punch-outs that annihilate cities. Bay's films show the action as a junkyard orgy. The '86 offering slows down to allow for actors like Leonard Nimoy and, yes, even Orson Welles to give actual performances. Fans of Michael Bay's Transformers movies are free to enjoy them. But they'll never top the gravity and excitement of The Transformers: The Movie."

Kashann Kilson of Inverse wrote in 2015: "Nostalgia is a funny thing: for many of us in the 30-and-over Transformers fan club, that first movie was an integral part of our childhood. To hell with what the reviews said—the O.G. Transformers movie rocked our collective worlds ... We still love the original so much today, part of the fun of watching Bay's explosion-fests is being able to wave our canes at the youngsters and wax poetic about how back in our day, Hollywood knew how to make a real movie about giant, alien robot warriors."

In the late 2010s, Den of Geek published several retrospective reviews focusing on the film's gruesome but quirky tone, and on the traumatic cultural impact of its violence, which is heavier than most preceding animated films. In 2018, it said "the shadow of death hung like a black curtain" over the film and called the psychedelic scenes of Unicron's world-eating guts "a futuristic rendering of Dante's Inferno" in "apocalyptic detail". In 2019, the film was called "The Great Toy Massacre of 1986" which "traumatized a generation of kids with a string of startling deaths". It is remembered as "a story about death, transfiguration, guilt, and redemption", and as "a milestone in animation history".

=== In other media ===
The song "The Touch" is performed by Dirk Diggler (portrayed by future live-action Transformers cast member Mark Wahlberg) in Paul Thomas Anderson's 1997 Oscar-nominated film Boogie Nights. His performance appears as a hidden track on the soundtrack album to the film.

== See also ==
- GoBots: Battle of the Rock Lords
- Transformers (live action film series)
- Transformers One
