= Fair Game (1995 film) =

- Theatrical release poster
- Directed by: Andrew Sipes
- Screenplay by: Charlie Fletcher
- Based on: Fair Game by Paula Gosling
- Produced by: Joel Silver
- Starring: William Baldwin; Cindy Crawford; Steven Berkoff; Christopher McDonald
- Cinematography: Richard Bowen
- Edited by: David Finfer; Steven Kemper; Christian Wagner
- Music by: Mark Mancina
- Production company: Silver Pictures
- Distributed by: Warner Bros.
- Release date: November 3, 1995
- Running time: 91 minutes
- Country: United States
- Language: English
- Budget: $50 million (estimated)
- Box office: $11.5 million

Fair Game is a 1995 American action thriller film directed by Andrew Sipes from the screenplay by Charlie Fletcher. It stars William Baldwin, Cindy Crawford, Steven Berkoff and Christopher McDonald and follows the police detective Kirkpatrick who must protect lawyer Kate McQuean when she is targeted for murder by ex-members of the KGB with interests in a ship owned by a Cuban man who may lose it in a divorce case being pursued by McQuean. Fair Game is based on Paula Gosling's 1974 novel A Running Duck, which was previously adapted into the 1986 film Cobra.

Locations used for the film included Coral Gables, Florida, Miami Beach, and the Florida Keys National Marine Sanctuary.

Fair Game was panned by critics and was a box office bomb, recouping only $11 million of its $50 million budget.

== Plot ==
Kate McQuean is a Miami civil attorney who, in the course of a divorce case, attempts to have a freighter moored off the Florida coast seized in lieu of unpaid alimony. The ship, which is owned by criminal Emilio Juantorena, is the current base of operations of Ilya Kazak, a former KGB agent who has become an international money launderer, and has also become the leader of a group of rogue ex-KGB members, including Stefan, Leonide "Hacker" Volkov, Navigator, Smiler, Rosa and Zhukov.

When Kate is hit by a stray bullet, Miami police detective Max Kirkpatrick is assigned to the case. Then an attempt is made on Kate's life by Kazak, who — after killing Juantorena — assembles his team to track and kill Kate; Max then becomes her protector.

Kate, Max, and two of his friends stay at a hotel used for witness protection. They order pizza using Kate's credit card, and Volkov traces the order. Rosa and two henchmen infiltrate the hotel and kill Max's colleagues. Max manages to kill the hit squad (except for Rosa); he and Kate then leave. After Max contacts his superior, Lt. Meyerson, FBI agents are sent to escort them. The "agents" turn out to be working for Kazak, and Max's partner and long-time friend Detective Louis Aragon is killed in the process. After killing some of Kazak's squadmates, Max and Kate travel through Florida, trying to avoid Kazak and find out why he wants Kate dead.

However, their jeep breaks down on a freeway and they call a tow truck to pick them up. Volkov and Stefan show up, while Kazak splits from them to deal with Max's cousin, who has been feeding them information regarding Kazak and his past activities in Cuba. Kate and Max are forced to run with the tow truck while their jeep is still hooked onto it. After a long chase and gunfight, Kate steps hard on the brakes while Max steers the wheel of the truck, unhooking their car and causing it to crash into Volkov's and Stefan's SUV, killing both of them.

One of Kate's clients is the former wife of Emilio Juantorena, and she is trying to repossess the boat to pay for her divorce settlement. This is the main reason why Kazak wishes to kill Kate.

Kate then flees from Max because she wants to get away from everyone, and manages to board a freight train, but Max catches up and boards the freight train also. They argue but then make up and start to have sex. During this, the criminals locate them on the train and attack them again. Kate is kidnapped by Kazak and taken to the freighter while Rosa and Zhukov are sent to kill Max. They accidentally kill Navigator and Max shoots the pair. Rosa, however, has a bulletproof vest on, and Max only kills her after a long fight.

Max then uses the hit squad's boat to board the freighter in an attempt to rescue Kate. They jump off the ship just in time to watch it blow up and sink, killing Kazak in the process. Kate and Max climb aboard the boat he used to reach the freighter and start to kiss, sailing off together into the sunset.

== Cast ==
- William Baldwin as Max Kirkpatrick, a Miami police detective
- Cindy Crawford as Kate McQuean, a civil lawyer who becomes a target for murder
- Steven Berkoff as Colonel Ilya Pavel Kazak, a rogue ex-KGB operative who now heads a group of terrorists
- Christopher McDonald as Lieutenant Meyerson, Max's boss
- Miguel Sandoval as Emilio Juantorena, the owner of the freighter which is Kazak's base of operations
- Johann Carlo as Jodi Kirkpatrick, Max's cousin who is a forensics specialist
- Salma Hayek as Rita, Max's ex-girlfriend
- John Bedford Lloyd as Detective Louis Aragon, Max's partner
- Frank Medrano as Detective Graybera
- Don Yesso as Detective Beanpole
- Jenette Goldstein as Rosa Souza, Kazak's brutal henchwoman
- Paul Dillon as Leonid "The Hacker" Volkov, one of Kazak's henchmen
- Olek Krupa as Zhukov, Kazak's henchman
- Gustav Vintas as Stefan, one of Kazak's henchmen
- Marc Macaulay as "Navigator", one of Kazak's henchmen
- Gary Francis Hope as "Smiler", one of Kazak's henchmen
- Antoni Corone as "Codebreaker", one of Kazak's henchmen
- Kane Hodder as One of Kazak's henchmen on train (uncredited)
- Sonny Carl Davis as Fake FBI Agent Baker, one of Kazak's henchmen
- Scott Michael Campbell as Adam, salesman at computer store
- Dan Hedaya as Walter Hollenbach (uncredited), Juantorena's attorney

== Production ==
In 1993 Sylvester Stallone was attached to the project. Geena Davis, Julianne Moore and Brooke Shields were all offered the role of Kate McQuean, but they all passed as they were busy with other projects, before supermodel Cindy Crawford was ultimately cast.

Initially, Fair Game ran for 95 minutes, but after re-edits and reshoots, the film came in four minutes shorter. After poor test screenings, Warner Bros. Pictures cut some scenes and reshot others. In the original version, Elizabeth Peña played the role of Rita, Max's ex-girlfriend, hence her name was included on the poster and the trailer. But when test audiences thought that Pena didn't seem right for the role, she was fired and Salma Hayek was brought in to replace her; Hayek said she took the part because she was allowed to rewrite the scenes she was in. Crawford and William Baldwin also shot additional scenes to help boost the relationship between their characters. Crawford also shot more scenes on her own in order to develop her character. Dan Hedaya had a bigger part in the original cut, but it was shortened to one scene and so he chose to go uncredited. The extra filming/additions and re-edit caused the film to be delayed by three months.

The theatrical trailer shows some deleted and alternate scenes cut from the original movie before it was partially re-shot and re-edited. For example, in the alternate interrogation scene, Kirkpatrick asks McQuean who's trying to kill her to which she responds that no one's trying to kill her. Also in an extended part of this scene, McQuean asks Kirkpatrick if he has problem with lawyers; he answers that he's a cop—that it's "written on the badge". There is also alternate dialogue between the two while they're driving in which he says that they can't trust the cops and when she asks him why she should trust him he says because he hasn't shot her, adding that the "night's still young". In an additional scene, he gives her a gun, she says she doesn't know how to shoot, but he says it's like taking a picture: just point and shoot. In another added scene, Kirkpatrick asks McQuean if she'll hit him—she says "night's still young", his line in the deleted scene from the trailer.

== Reception ==
=== Box office ===
Fair Game is considered to be a box office bomb, grossing only US$11.5 million against production budget of $50 million.

=== Critical response ===
Fair Game was panned by critics. On Rotten Tomatoes it has an approval rating of 15% based on 27 reviews, with an average rating of 3.20/10. On Metacritic the film has a score of 13% based on reviews from 18 critics, indicating "overwhelming dislike". Audiences polled by CinemaScore gave the film an average grade of "C+" on an A+ to F scale.

Kenneth Turan of the Los Angeles Times called it "The lamest model-turned-actress movie since Lauren Hutton co-starred with Evel Knievel in the misbegotten Viva Knievel!." Roger Ebert of the Chicago Sun-Times said the film "Works as a thriller for anyone who lives entirely in the present. Those with longer memories will find the film grows increasingly funny as it rolls along." Brian Lowry of Variety wrote: "Fair Game is otherwise notable only for its jaw-dropping stupidity, the sort of action yarn that hopes nonstop mayhem will help cloud just how nonsensical it is."

Most critics singled out Crawford's poor acting. Liam Lacey of The Globe and Mail saying that "One could scavenge the thesaurus to find synonyms for 'awkward' to describe Crawford's performance."

Mick LaSalle of the San Francisco Chronicle gave it 2 out of 4. He starts by stating that Crawford cannot act, but that it does not get in the way. LaSalle called it "An enjoyable movie" and "The chases, crashes and explosions keep coming, but then pace is crucial in a film like this. If you had time to think, you might start rooting for the Russians."

=== Cast response ===
In 1995 Crawford said she was offended by some of the comments rejecting the possibility that she could be a lawyer, saying "I thought we'd gotten over the idea that if someone is beautiful they must be stupid."

In an interview, William Baldwin was asked which film deserved a Razzie more, Fair Game or Sliver. Baldwin chose Fair Game, adding: “I do not think that Fair Game suffered, like a lot of people would suggest, as a result of any contribution by Cindy Crawford. The director [Andrew Sipes] was in way over his head, and he alienated a lot of people. That girl is an absolute angel, and she'd come onto the set and he wouldn't even make eye contact with her. Talk about shitting where you eat. That guy was a moron.”

In 2013 interview with Oprah Winfrey, Cindy Crawford said she did not regret doing Fair Game: "I knew a producer named Joel Silver and he asked me to do a movie for him and I was like, 'Joel, I'm not an actress, I don't want to be an actress.' And he was like, 'I really want you to do this movie, you're doing this movie.' And I kept saying, 'No, no, no,' and he kept saying, 'How much more money?' And at a certain point I was like, 'I'm an idiot if I don't do it'. I should have been more focused on who the director was than what kind of trailer I got because... after the third week he stopped speaking to anyone on the set. It was difficult because here I am, I'm not an actress, and literally [I] would get zero direction. It wasn't the worst movie ever made, I've certainly seen worse, but it just didn't do well and people weren't that impressed with my performance."

=== Accolades ===
The film was nominated for three Razzie Awards, for Worst Actress (Crawford), Worst New Star (Crawford) and Worst Screen Couple (Crawford and Baldwin), where it lost all of these categories to Showgirls. Crawford was also nominated for Worst Actress at the 1995 Stinkers Bad Movie Awards but lost to Julia Sweeney for It's Pat.
