= The Touch (Stan Bush song) =

Single by Stan Bush

from the album The Transformers: The Movie (Original Motion Picture Soundtrack)
- Released: September 1, 1986
- Genre: Power pop; hard rock
- Length: 3:55
- Label: Scotti Brothers
- Songwriters: Lenny Macaluso and Stan Bush
- Producer: Richie Wise

"The Touch" is a rock song by American singer and guitarist Stan Bush. The song features prominently in the animated film The Transformers: The Movie (1986), and appears on the soundtrack album released that year.

== History ==
"The Touch" was released as a double A-side single with "Weird Al" Yankovic's "Dare to Be Stupid", another song from the soundtrack album of the Transformers movie. The power ballad was also released in 1987 on Stan Bush & Barrage's self-titled album. The song was inspired by a line in the movie Iron Eagle, and originally written for Sylvester Stallone's film Cobra Its inclusion on the Transformers soundtrack was Bush's first exposure to the franchise.

The song was performed by Mark Wahlberg in Paul Thomas Anderson's film Boogie Nights (1997). In 1997, Bush re-recorded the song and "Dare" (another song from The Transformers: The Movie) for the BotCon exclusive soundtrack CD Til All Are One. Bush submitted a different re-recorded version of the song from his album In This Life for the 2007 live action Transformers film, but it was not included on the final soundtrack. He later recorded another version, subtitled "Sam's Theme", for possible inclusion in the 2009 sequel Revenge of the Fallen. The 2009 version differs markedly from the original and 2007 versions, adding rap verses and being more melancholic in tone, with it being described as a "redux a la Linkin Park". In 2010, Bush released a music video for "The Touch: Sam's Theme" on his YouTube channel, featuring clips from the first two Transformers films. The song was edited with the rap verses removed, and was included in the 2010 album Dream the Dream.

The 2007 version of "The Touch" was released as a free downloadable track for the video game Guitar Hero World Tour on May 28, 2009. On April 5, 2009, "The Touch" was featured in a YouTube video tribute to voice actress Lara Jill Miller. Bush had expressed interest in wanting the song to appear in the game or in competing music game Rock Band. On October 12, 2010, the song was released as a downloadable track for Rock Band through the Rock Band Network.

The song was re-recorded in 2026 by Hasbro's in-house band Knights of Unicron with vocals by Bush for the 40th anniversary Reformatted Edition of the film soundtrack.

== Personnel ==
- Stan Bush - lead and backing vocals, lead guitar
- Jack Johnson - rhythm guitar, backing vocals
- Daniel Robinson - bass guitar, backing vocals
- Sam Smith - drums, percussion
- Luke Hemmings - keyboards, electric piano
