= Dangerous Attraction =

Studio album by Lion
- Released: July 21, 1987
- Recorded: 1986
- Studios: Santa Monica Sound Recorders, Santa Monica, California
- Genres: Hard rock, heavy metal, glam metal
- Length: 44:13
- Label: Scotti Brothers
- Producer: Lion

Lion chronology
Power Love (1986)	Dangerous Attraction (1987)	Trouble in Angel City (1989)

Singles from Dangerous Attraction
- 1. "The Transformers (Theme)" Released: 1986; 2. "Powerlove" Released: July 1987

Dangerous Attraction is the debut album released by heavy metal band Lion.

The original album was released in Japan as an import. A remastered edition was released in 2017 and included "The Transformers (Theme)" single as a bonus track.

== Critical reception ==
American magazine Cashbox reacted positively to the album's music with the comment "Fairly melodic, beat-heavy metal pop with hooky anthemic choruses to burn. Sets no new standards, but fits well in the genre."

== Track listing ==
Side one
No.	Title	Writer(s)	Length
1.	"Fatal Attraction"	Kal Swan, Doug Aldrich	4:16
2.	"Armed and Dangerous"	Swan, Aldrich, Mark Hansen Holden	3:42
3.	"Hard and Heavy"	Swan	4:36
4.	"Never Surrender"	Swan, Aldrich	3:33
5.	"Death on Legs"	Swan, Aldrich, Holden	4:15

Side two
No.	Title	Writer(s)	Length
6.	"Powerlove"	Swan, Aldrich	3:56
7.	"In the Name of Love"	Swan	6:19
8.	"After the Fire"	Swan	4:44
9.	"Shout It Out"	Swan	5:22

Remastered CD edition bonus track
No.	Title	Writer(s)	Length
10.	"The Transformers (Theme)"	Ford Kinder, Anne Bryant, Aldrich, Swan	3:36

== Personnel ==
Lion

- Kal Swan – vocals, acoustic guitar
- Doug Aldrich – guitars, backing vocals
- Jerry Best – bass, backing vocals
- Mark Edwards – drums, backing vocals

Additional musicians

- Pat Regan – keyboards
- Gary Falcone – additional backing vocals
- Scott MacLachlan – additional backing vocals
- Vicki Seeger – additional backing vocals

== Production ==
- Lion – producers
- Bill Freesh – engineer
- Jamey Dell – assistant engineer
- Jim Isaacs – production coordination
- Julia Melanie Goode – creative direction
- Kal Swan – logo design
- Andy Rosen – photography
- Glen La Ferman – back cover photography
- Bill Silby – lettering
