= Paula Gosling =

United States-born crime writer

- Born: October 12, 1939 (age 86); Detroit, Michigan, U.S.
- Education: Mackenzie High School; Wayne State University
- Occupation: Novelist
- Writing career
- Genres: Crime, suspense, literary fiction

Paula Gosling (born October 12, 1939) is an American-born crime writer. She has lived in the United Kingdom since the 1960s. In 1957, Gosling graduated from Mackenzie High School in Detroit, Michigan. Following her high school career, she obtained her English degree at Wayne State University, graduating in 1962. Gosling began her writing career as a copy-writer. In 1974, she published her first novel, A Running Duck, which won the John Creasey Award for the best first novel of the year. In 1985, Gosling received the Gold Dagger for her subsequent book, Monkey Puzzle. She is a past Chairman of the Crime Writers' Association.

A Running Duck, also published as Fair Game, has been adapted twice into films; once as a Sylvester Stallone vehicle, Cobra, and the second time as a film with Cindy Crawford entitled Fair Game.

== Books ==
=== Monkey Puzzle ===
The novel deals with the death of a disliked university professor, murdered in a gruesome way ("large dent in his skull, multiple stab wounds, and his tongue cut out" as described by the reviewer). The plot also includes the romance between the police investigating the matter and his childhood friend. This adds more drama and difficulties for the agonist throughout the novel.

=== The Wychford Murders ===
The first series of Detective Luke Abbott starts with this novel, dealing with serial murder in his hometown Wychford. The detective meets his friend from childhood and eventually falls in love with her, adding to the plot the romantic aspect of it. Many difficulties are faced by the detective as he falls into false trails. The novel is told from two perspectives, the detective's and his romantic parter's. These perspectives add more insight to the storyline.

=== Death Penalties ===
The novel deals with finding about death of an interior designer's husband and assault of the woman. It deals with the heroine fighting through the various odds against her but finally arriving at the answer to the mystery. According to the critic Rex Klett, the "plot waffles a bit" which might be worth noting when reading this novel.

=== Tears of the Dragon ===
Paula Gosling explores another culture with her latest novel, Tears of the Dragon. The main character, Elodie Brown, witnesses the murder scene at a party she was waitressing. Elodie hears the last words of the victim. She sets out on a journey. Instead of trusting the matters to the police, she is determined to find out the meaning behind the words. The heroine eventually finds herself in the midst of "Chinese politics, priceless jade, bootleggers, and drugs," delving deeper into the more serious matters.

== Bibliography ==
=== Jack Stryker series ===
- Monkey Puzzle (1985); Gold Dagger Award
- Backlash (1989)
- Ricochet (2002)

=== Luke Abbott series ===
- The Wychford Murders (1986)
- Death Penalties (1991)

=== Blackwater Bay series ===
- The Body in Blackwater Bay (1992)
- A Few Dying Words (1993)
- The Dead of Winter (1995)
- Death and Shadows (1998)
- Underneath Every Stone (2000)

=== Other novels ===
- A Running Duck (1974) (also published as Fair Game); John Creasey Award
- The Zero Trap (1979)
- Loser's Blues (1980) (also published as Solo Blues)
- Mind's Eye (1980) (writing as Ainslie Skinner) (also published as The Harrowing)
- The Woman in Red (1983)
- Hoodwink (1988)
- Cobra (1999)
- Tears of the Dragon (2004)
