= Kal Swan =

Scottish singer

- Birth name: Norman Murray Swan
- Born: 20 April 1963 (age 61); Glasgow, Scotland
- Genres: Hard rock, heavy metal
- Occupation(s): Singer, songwriter
- Years active: 1981–1999
- Formerly of: Lion, Tytan, Bad Moon Rising

Kal Swan (born Norman Murray Swan; 20 April 1963) is a Scottish rock singer. He is best known as the vocalist for the bands Lion, Tytan and Bad Moon Rising.

== Discography ==
=== KUNI ===
- 1986 – Masque (vocals on "Restless Heart")

=== Tytan ===
- 1985 – Rough Justice

=== Lion ===
- 1986 – Power Love
- 1986 – The Transformers The Movie: Original Motion Picture Soundtrack
- 1987 – Dangerous Attraction
- 1989 – Trouble in Angel City

=== Bad Moon Rising ===
- 1991 – Full Moon Fever
- 1991 – Bad Moon Rising
- 1993 – Blood
- 1993 – Blood on the Streets
- 1995 – Opium for the Masses
- 1995 – Moonchild (single)
- 1995 – Junkyard Haze
- 1999 – Flames on the Moon
- 2005 – Full Moon Collection
