= The Transformers: The Movie (Original Motion Picture Soundtrack) =

1986 soundtrack album

Soundtrack album by Various Artists
- Released: (US) July 24, 1986 (JP) 1989 (US Re-release) 1992
- Genres: Glam metal; hard rock; film score
- Length: 37:45
- Labels: (US) Scotti Bros. Records (JP) Pony Canyon (US Re-release) Volcano Entertainment
- Producers: Richie Wise; Ernie Burns; Vince DiCola; Ed Fruge; Randy Bishop; Spencer Proffer; Rick Derringer

Singles from The Transformers The Movie: Original Motion Picture Soundtrack
- 1. "The Touch / Dare to Be Stupid" Released: July 1986

Professional ratings
Review scores
Source	Rating
AllMusic	4/5 stars
Sputnikmusic	3/5 stars

The Transformers: The Movie (Original Motion Picture Soundtrack) is the soundtrack album to the 1986 film of the same name. It features an original score composed by Vince DiCola alongside songs that feature in the film, including Stan Bush's "The Touch", which would go on to garner a significance in the Transformers fandom. It was released in the United States ahead of The Transformers: The Movie's theatrical release on July 26, 1986 by Scotti Brothers Records on LP and cassette.

== Release history ==
The soundtrack was originally released in Japan by Pony Canyon on Compact Disc Digital Audio in 1989.

Stan Bush’s "The Touch" was released as a single and issued in the United States as a 45 RPM by Scotti Bros., with "Weird Al" Yankovic’s "Dare to Be Stupid" on the B-side. In the United Kingdom, Epic Records also issued the single as a die-cut picture disc featuring toy box art for the G1 Transformer Superion.

In 1992, Scotti Brothers released the album on CD in the United States. By 1999, it was subsequently re-issued by eventual successor company Volcano Entertainment, and was re-released in 2007 with updated cover art and four bonus tracks.

In the fall of 2015, the soundtrack was reissued by Sony’s Legacy label as a limited-edition vinyl release for Record Store Day, marking the then-upcoming 30th anniversary of the film.

== Reception ==
The soundtrack received little media attention or commercial radio airplay prior to or during the film’s theatrical release. The single issued from the album, “The Touch", also received minimal airplay in the United States. “The Touch” fared somewhat better on German radio; RTL Luxembourg named it one of its “Records of the Week” for the week of 1986-10-04. It also received airplay on stations in Hamburg and Munchen stations.

Ivan Brunet of British Columbia's Nanaimo Daily News described the soundtrack as “Basically heavy metal music.” He singled out “Nothin's Gonna Stand in Our Way” by Kick Axe and “Instruments of Destruction” by NRG as standouts, but identified the key track as Stan Bush's “The Touch,” which he called “a fiery rock tune.” He added, “Uneven as this album is, it will more than likely fare well on the strength of the film.”

In Marianne Meyer's A/P column “Rock View”, she described it as “A rock soundtrack featuring generally obscure musical acts” and used it as an example of the industry's “soundtrack mania” at the time, writing that it was released in “an effort to bring older kids in to the theater for this toy-inspired cartoon.”

== Track listing ==
Side A
No.	Title	Writer(s)	Artist	Length
1.	"The Touch"	Lenny Macaluso; Stan Bush	Stan Bush	3:57
2.	"Instruments of Destruction"	Ernie Pertangelo; Robin Ward; Steven Serpa	NRG	3:21
3.	"Death of Optimus Prime"	Vince DiCola	Vince DiCola	2:58
4.	"Dare"	Scott Shelly; DiCola	Stan Bush	4:01
5.	"Nothing's Gonna Stand in Our Way" (John Farnham cover)	Randy Bishop	Kick Axe	3:38

Side B
No.	Title	Writer(s)	Artist	Length
1.	"The Transformers (Theme)"	Anne Bryant; Doug Aldrich; Ford Kinder; Norman Swan	Lion	3:35
2.	"Escape"	DiCola	Vince DiCola	4:46
3.	"Hunger"	Brian Gillstrom; George Criston; Larry Gillstrom; Raymond Harvey; Spencer Proffer; Victor Langen	Kick Axe	3:45
4.	"Autobot/Decepticon Battle"	DiCola	Vince DiCola	4:18
5.	"Dare to Be Stupid"	Al Yankovic	"Weird Al" Yankovic	3:27

2007 bonus tracks
No.	Title	Writer(s)	Artist	Length
11.	"Unicron Medley"	DiCola	Vince DiCola	5:26
12.	"Moon Base 2 - Shuttle Launch"	DiCola	Vince DiCola	2:34
13.	"Megatron Must Be Stopped - Parts 1 and 2"	DiCola	Vince DiCola	6:15
14.	"The Transformers (Theme)" (Alternate Version)	Bryant; Aldrich; Kinder; Swan	Vince DiCola and Stan Bush	2:39
Total length:				54:40

== 40th anniversary Reformatted Edition ==
The Transformers: The Movie (The Soundtrack) – The Reformatted Edition

Soundtrack album by Knights of Unicron
- Released: July 24, 2026
- Genres: Power metal; hard rock; film score
- Labels: Hasbro; Reigning Phoenix Music

To commemorate the 40th anniversary of the film, Hasbro collaborated with Raging Phoenix Music to release The Transformers: The Movie (The Soundtrack) – The Reformatted Edition. The album features the soundtrack re-recorded by Hasbro's in-house band Knights of Unicron (comprised of Matt Harvey (Exhumed, Gruesome), Gus Rios (Gruesome), and Ross Sewage (Exhumed)), with Stan Bush, Vince DiCola, Sebastian Bach and other guest artists.

=== Track listing ===
No.	Title	Writer(s)	Featured artist(s)	Length
1.	"The Touch"	Lenny Macaluso; Stan Bush	Stan Bush	4:00
2.	"Instruments of Destruction"	Ernie Pertangelo; Robin Ward; Steven Serpa	Francesco Cavalieri	3:20
3.	"Death of Optimus Prime"	Vince DiCola	Vince DiCola	4:42
4.	"Dare"	Scott Shelly; DiCola	Stan Bush and Vince DiCola	4:00
5.	"Nothing's Gonna Stand in Our Way"	Randy Bishop	Sebastian Bach	3:31
6.	"The Transformers (Theme)"	Anne Bryant; Doug Aldrich; Ford Kinder; Norman Swan	Brittney Slayes	3:31
7.	"Escape"	DiCola	Knights of Unicron	4:45
8.	"Hunger"	Brian Gillstrom; George Criston; Larry Gillstrom; Raymond Harvey; Spencer Proffer; Victor Langen	Mark Osegueda	3:47
9.	"Autobot/Decepticon Battle"	DiCola	Knights of Unicron	4:16
10.	"Dare to Be Stupid"	Al Yankovic	Torch	3:27

=== Charts ===
Chart performance for The Transformers: The Movie (The Soundtrack) – The Reformatted Edition
Chart (2026)	Peak position
US Top Album Sales (Billboard)	18

== Legacy ==
- Power-metal band N.R.G. has since been reborn as Damn Cheetah, with a first album release titled Primal.
- The Lion cover version of the main Transformers theme was itself covered on the NES by chiptune artist Inverse Phase and renamed to "NESformers".
- "Subsong 2" from the Commodore 64 video game Turrican is actually the song "Escape" from The Transformers: The Movie soundtrack.
- Unicron's theme appears in the live-action sequel Transformers: Rise of the Beasts (2023).

== In popular culture ==
- The song "The Touch" is performed by Mark Wahlberg's character Dirk Diggler in the comedy drama Boogie Nights (1997). His performance appears as a hidden track on the soundtrack album to the film.
- Stan Bush's original version of "The Touch" was used in the 2008 Chuck episode "Chuck Versus Tom Sawyer", along with an episode of American Dad! and The Goldbergs. The song also appears in the games Shadow Warrior, Saints Row IV, and the next gen rerelease of Grand Theft Auto V.
- The "Passiona High" sketch from cult Australian radio show Get This was based around several songs from the Transformers soundtrack, reworked into the storyline of an underdog nerd winning the eponymous school's annual synthesizer solo contest. The album tracks featured are "The Touch", "Autobot/Decepticon Battle", "Escape" and "Dare".
- The "Get Psyched Mix" from Barney Stinson and the "Bro Code" on How I Met Your Mother point "The Transformers Theme" as a "Classic Get Psyched Song".
- The Cybertronic Spree covers much of the album at conventions.
- "Dare" is featured in The Goldbergs Season 4 episode "Fonzie Scheme" during the scene when Barry is attempting to jump a golf cart off of a mound of dirt.
- "Dare" is featured in "Live Studio Audience", the seventh episode for the first season of the Netflix series GLOW, during a wrestling training montage between main characters Ruth and Debbie.
- "Dare" is used during the fight training scene in the sports comedy film Goon: Last of the Enforcers (2017).
