= Bad Moon Rising (band) =

American rock band

- Promotional photo of the band

Background information
- Origin: United States
- Genre: Hard rock
- Years active: 1990–1998
- Label: Frontiers Records
- Past members: Doug Aldrich; Ian Mayo; Jackie Ramos; Kal Swan
- Website: bmr.cool-rock.com

Bad Moon Rising was an American hard rock band that rose to fame in Japan with a series of albums led by Scottish born vocalist Kal Swan (real name Norman Swan) and guitarist Doug Aldrich.

Both Kal Swan and Doug are ex-Lion members, whilst the rhythm team of bassist Ian Mayo and drummer Jackie Ramos had played in both Hericane Alice and Bangalore Choir. Prior to relocating from England to Los Angeles Swan had fronted up the NWOBHM heavy metal band Tytan.

== History ==
The debut album, produced by Mack sees musicians including UFO guitarist Michael Schenker and Robin Mcauley together with ex-Quiet Riot bassist Chuck Wright, Michael Schenker Group's Rocky Newton and Fifth Angel and Alice Cooper drummer Ken Mary. Both Wright and Mary were former members of House of Lords. Bad Moon Rising put in an extensive tour of Japan during June 1991 and were voted by readers of the influential Burrn! magazine as 'Brightest new hope' for the following year.

1993's Blood album features the guest rhythm section showing of Wright and Mary once more, however Ramos and Mayo appear in the booklet and are listed as full members. The album was delivered in Japan during March with an EP Blood On The Streets issued the following month. Bad Moon Rising returned to Japan in October for a further run of dates, giving a nod to their influences by including Bad Company's 'Movin' On', Thin Lizzy's 'Cowboy Song' and Deep Purple's 'Highway Star' in their live set.

Doug Aldrich struck out on his own in 1994. Releasing the mainly instrumental Highcentered album. Such was the band's stature in Japan the guitarist put in a series of appearances to plug this solo effort.

The French release of Opium For The Masses came complete with a free four-track EP containing previously unreleased material. Touring had the band gigging throughout France in May, including a support to Van Halen at Le Zenith in Paris, upfront of Japanese gigs. The set this time around featured two Jimi Hendrix workouts 'Purple Haze' and 'Voodoo Chile' plus another Thin Lizzy tune 'Don't Believe A Word'. The following year both Opium For The Masses and Highcentered saw release in the USA. Such was fan fervour for Bad Moon Rising in Japan that North American versions of Opium For The Masses were imported back so that ardent fans could buy both variants.

A second solo album from Aldrich, Electrovision, emerged in Japan during 1997, featuring Kal Swan on the song Sky Blue and Black. In November 1998, the band had officially broken up and in 1999 Aldrich had created a new act Burning Rain fronted by ex-Medicine Wheel vocalist Keith St John.

2005 saw the re-packaging of all three Bad Moon Rising albums, plus eight bonus tracks, by the Italian label Frontiers Records under the billing 'The Full Moon Collection'.

== Bad Moon Rising ==
Year	Artist	Album
1991	Full Moon Fever	EP
1991	Bad Moon Rising	Studio
1993	Blood on the Streets	EP
1993	Blood	Studio
1995	Junkyard Haze	EP
1995	Opium for the Masses (alternate title: Free)	Studio
1995	Millwall Brick	Promo EP
1995	Junkyard Haze	EP
1999	Flames on the Moon	Compilation
2005	Full Moon Collection	Box-set
