= Tytan (band) =

British rock band

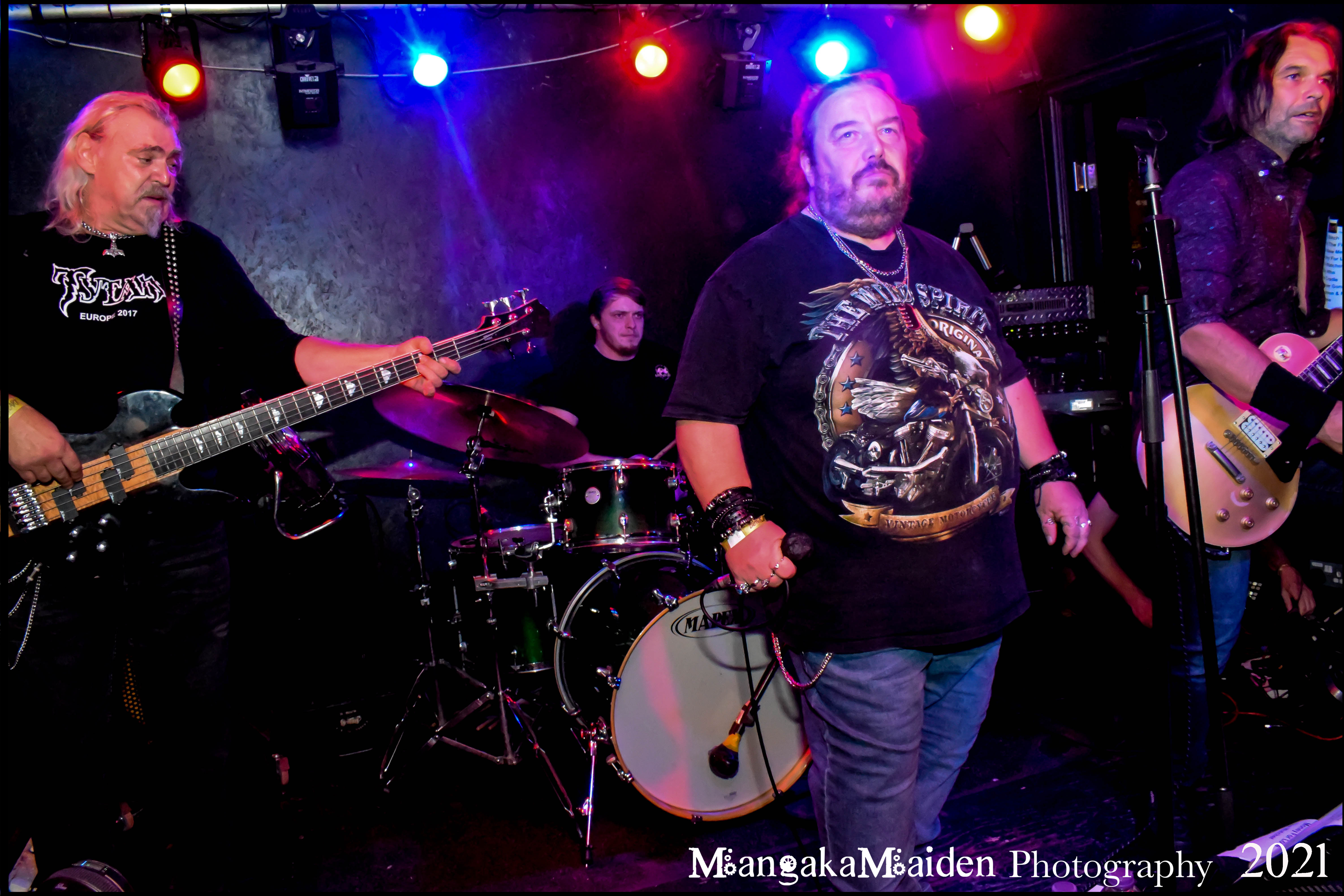
- The band in 2021 (L-R Kev Riddles, Seth Marks, Tony Coldham, Peter Welsh)

Background information
- Origin: London, England
- Genres: NWOBHM, hard rock, heavy metal
- Years active: 1981–1983, 2012–present
- Labels: Kamaflage, Majestic, High Roller
- Members: Andrew Thompson, Ian Nash, Mark Walker, Mark Hale, Julian Juey D Hill
- Past members: Steve Mann; Tom Barna; James Wise; Kal Swan; Les Binks; Dave Harrison; Dave Dufort; Tony Boden; Simon Wright; Gary Owens; Stewartie Adams; Mikey Ciancio; Steve Gibbs; Andrew Prestidge; Grant Foster; Dave Strange; Seth Markes; Peter Welsh; Tony Coldham; Garry Bowler; Kevin Riddles

Tytan are a British rock band that lasted about two years during the early 1980s, founded by former Angel Witch bassist Kev Riddles. The album Rough Justice was released after their split. They formed during the New Wave of British Heavy Metal movement. The band reformed in 2012 to play at the Keep It True festival in Germany and have been touring ever since. In 2016 the band recorded a second album, Justice Served, with Chris Tsangarides for High Roller Records; it was released in May 2017.

== History ==
Tytan was formed at the height of the new wave of British heavy metal in the autumn of 1981 by the former Angel Witch rhythm section, bassist Kevin Riddles and drummer Dave Dufort (ex-E. F. Band), Scottish vocalist Norman 'Kal' Swan, and guitarists Steve Gibbs and Glasgow-born Stewartie Adams. The latter unfortunately had to leave the band and Gary Owens (ex-A II Z, Aurora) had a brief stay before Steve Mann (ex-Liar, Lionheart) joined.

Signed to Kamaflage Records, a subsidiary of DJM, Tytan recorded their first album at Ramport Studios in Battersea with Will Reid-Dick manning the boards. Former Judas Priest and Lionheart drummer Les Binks joined the band just in time for the recording, in place of Dave Dufort. Jody Turner of Rock Goddess made a guest vocal appearance on the song Women On The Frontline. Binks would be replaced by Tony Boden on the band's October 1982 UK tour with the Tygers of Pan Tang. He left shortly thereafter, to be replaced by future Dio and AC/DC drummer Simon Wright (ex-Tora Tora, A II Z, Aurora).

Kamaflage folded before the album was released but managed to release the single 'Blind Men and Fools' in both 7" and 12" formats in September 1982. The band split up the following summer. Vocalist Kal Swan moved to Los Angeles, where he formed the band Lion with former Lone Star guitarist Tony Smith, whose replacement was Doug Aldrich. Steve Mann returned to Lionheart.

In 1985, London-based label Metal Masters released the shelved Tytan tapes as the Rough Justice LP. A Japanese CD bootleg followed in the early 1990s, before Majestic Rock Records gave the album an official CD re-issue in 2004 and again in 2006, with four BBC 'Friday Rock Show' live session tracks ('Cold Bitch', 'The Watcher', 'Far Side of Destiny' and 'Blind Men and Fools') and a live DVD added as bonuses with the second edition.

In 2012, an invitation to perform at Keep It True XV Festival in Germany saw Tytan reform with a revised line-up. Joining original band members Kevin Riddles, Steve Gibbs and Steve Mann were vocalist Tom Barna (from the band Diamond Faith), Andrew Thompson on keyboards, and Angel Witch drummer Andrew Prestidge. Steve Gibbs left the band in early 2014. Drummers Chris Benton and then Mikey Ciancio joined during 2012 and 2013 respectively, and between 2015 and 2017 James Wise took over the role, followed by Seth Markes. Meanwhile, Dave Strange joined on guitar in November 2014, when Steve Mann departed. Dave Strange was replaced in 2021 by guitarist Peter Welsh. Welsh left Tytan in 2022 and went on to join nwobhm band More. Tom Barna's replacement, Tony Coldham, performed his last show with the band on 13 October 2018, as he had decided to concentrate on his other outfit, The Deep. In December 2018, the band recruited vocalist Grant Foster. In 2021, Tony Coldham returned to Tytan lineup and left again in 2024 to concentrate on The Deep.

In 2017, Tytan released a follow-up album to Rough Justice, Justice Served, through German label High Roller Records. At the same time, the company also re-issued the group's out-of-print debut album, Rough Justice.

Original bassist Kevin Riddles died on 4 July 2025, at the age of 68.

== Discography ==
- Blind Men and Fools 7"& 12" (Kamaflage, 1982)
- Rough Justice (Metal Masters, 1985 / Majestic Rock, 2004 & 2006 / High Roller Records, 2017)
- Justice Served (High Roller Records, 2017)

== See also ==
- List of new wave of British heavy metal bands
