= Lion (band) =

American rock band

- Origin: Los Angeles, California, U.S.
- Genres: Hard rock, heavy metal, glam metal
- Years active: 1983–1989
- Past members: Kal Swan; Tony Smith; Alex Campbell; Mark Edwards; Doug Aldrich; Jerry Best

Lion was an American rock band known for the theme song in The Transformers: The Movie (1986), their debut song "Love Is a Lie" in Friday the 13th: The Final Chapter (1984), and their songs "Never Surrender" and "Power Love" in The Wraith (1986).

== History ==
=== Creation of the band ===
The band, originally titled "Lyon", were formed in Los Angeles in 1983 after ex-Tytan vocalist Kal Swan (born Norman Swan) and former Lone Star guitarist Tony Smith relocated from Great Britain and teamed up with bassist Alex Campbell and drummer Mark Edwards, who had been in Steeler alongside Yngwie Malmsteen, and Third Stage Alert. After beginning work on a demo, Swan and Edwards recruited guitarist Doug Aldrich and bassist Jerry Best (both of whom had previously recorded with the band Mansfield) to complete the Lion lineup.

=== Early recordings ===
In 1984, the group made its debut with "Love Is a Lie", a song on the Friday the 13th: The Final Chapter soundtrack. In 1985, Lion returned with Power Love, a six-song EP released only in Japan. (It was re-issued on CD in 1992 along with Mark Edwards' 1985 Code of Honor solo EP.)

After recording the theme song for the Transformers animated film, they signed to Scotti Brothers and released their first album, Dangerous Attraction (1987). Their next record, Trouble in Angel City (1989), was released on the Grand Slamm label. It contained re-recordings of the Power Love EP songs, a cover of the Slade song "Lock Up Your Daughters", and several new tracks.

=== Break-up ===
In September of that year, Edwards suffered a broken neck after falling off a cliff while competing in a motorcycle race. Lion disbanded a month later.

Swan and Aldrich later teamed up with the band Bad Moon Rising along with former Hericane Alice members Jackie Ramos and Ian Mayo. Aldrich also recorded with Hurricane, House of Lords, Burning Rain, Dio and Whitesnake. Jerry Best later re-appeared in Freak of Nature, featuring former White Lion vocalist Mike Tramp; he also briefly toured with Dio in the late 1990s.

== Discography ==
=== Studio albums ===
- Dangerous Attraction (1987)
- Trouble in Angel City (1989)

=== EPs ===
- Power Love (1986)

=== Soundtracks ===
- Friday the 13th: The Final Chapter (1984)
- The Wraith – Original Motion Picture Soundtrack (1986)
- The Transformers: The Movie (Original Motion Picture Soundtrack) (1986)
