= Stan Bush =

American singer-songwriter and musician

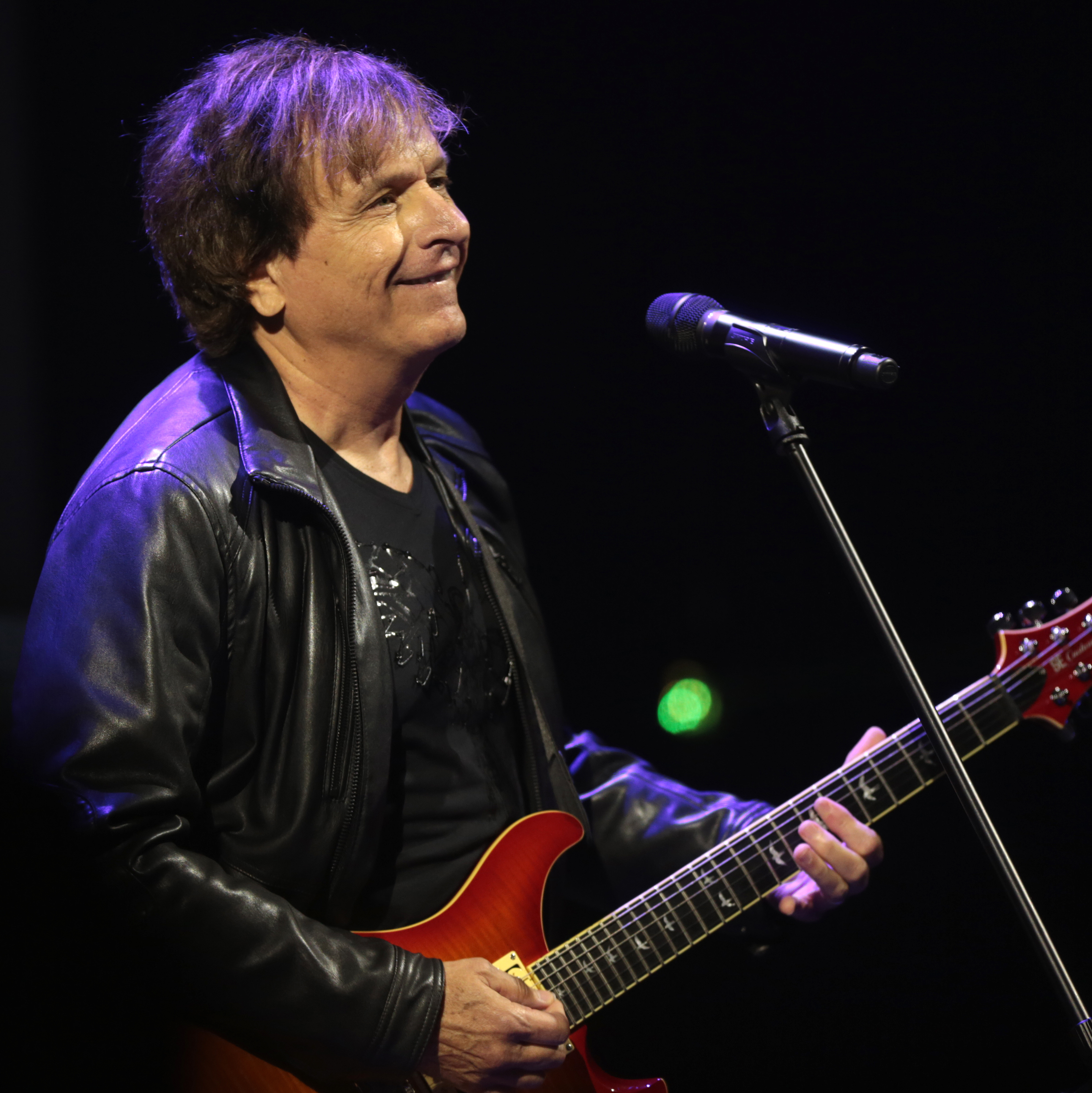
- Bush in 2018

Background information
- Born: July 10, 1953 (age 73); Orlando, Florida, U.S.
- Genres: Hard rock, pop rock
- Occupations: Singer-songwriter, musician
- Instruments: Vocals, guitar
- Years active: 1979–present
- Labels: L.A. Records; Scotti Bros.
- Website: stanbush.com

Stan Bush (born July 10, 1953) is an American singer-songwriter and rock musician. He is best-known for his song "The Touch", featured in the 1986 movie The Transformers: The Movie.

== Career ==
Bush began with his first studio album in 1979 with a band called Boulder. Bush was primarily a guitarist for that band before the group split in different directions after releasing only one self-titled album. It was not long after in which he got his first solo album deal with CBS Records and released the self-titled Stan Bush album in 1983. Four years later on Scotti Bros Records, he would release his most successful album to date with Stan Bush & Barrage, which is the album that featured "The Touch".

Bush's most notable works include the songs "The Touch" and "Dare" from the soundtrack to the 1986 animated film The Transformers: The Movie, "Hearts vs. Heads" from the soundtrack to the 1986 film The Wraith, and "She's Got the Power", featured in the American voice dub of the animated series Sailor Moon. He made one track on the children's album Take My Hand – Songs from the 100 Acre Wood titled "That's What Tiggers Do Best", released in 1995. Other notable works include the songs "Never Surrender", "Streets of Siam", and "Fight for Love" from the movie Kickboxer, "On My Own – Alone" and "Fight to Survive", the theme from Bloodsport. In 1987, Bush (and back-up band Barrage) wrote and recorded the ballad "Love Don't Lie", which became a minor MTV hit when covered a year later by House of Lords.

In 1996, Bush released the album The Child Within which featured a few songs of prominence. "Til I Was Loved By You", a duet with Robin Beck, won a Daytime Emmy for Best Original Song for its use in the soap opera Guiding Light. From the same album, "Capture the Dream" was used as the official anthem to the US Swim Team in the 1996 Summer Olympics. The Child Within was released in Japan with the title Higher than Angels, additional songs, and different versions of the same songs.

Bush submitted two tracks to the producers of the 2007 live action Transformers movie, which are an updated version of "The Touch", and an updated version of his song from BotCon 1997, "Ground Zero", retitled "'Till All Are One". They were not included on the final soundtrack, but they were included on the July 3, 2007 release In This Life. Bush also recorded another, markedly different version of "The Touch" which was later released as a free downloadable track for the video game Guitar Hero World Tour. "Till All Are One" is the end credits song for 2010 video game Transformers: War for Cybertron.

Bush would later re-record "The Touch" again, this time in a much darker, grittier sense for his 2010 album, Dream the Dream. This version was known as "The Touch (Sam's Theme)", with the single version even containing a rap segment that was omitted from the album cut.

In 2011, Bush recorded "High Noon Theme" for the wrestling promotion Chikara, which is a parody of the theme song for the 1980s cartoon M.A.S.K. This was followed by his single "Heat of the Battle", which was included on his 2014 album release The Ultimate. Not long after the release of this album, he was inducted into the Transformers Hall of Fame at the 2014 BotCon Transformers Fan Convention. On September 22, 2017, Bush released his thirteenth studio album called Change the World. The album features eleven tracks which are six all-new songs and five from previous works. On the Fourth of July 2019, Bush released a brand new single and music video called The 80's. The music video for the song featured Bush's son playing a young version of him from the titular decade. It was the first single of the album Dare to Dream, which was released in 2020.

Outside of music, Bush was the focus of a web-produced television pilot called Palisades Vice. Produced by Twin Suns Productions, the pilot known as "Black Shoe Diary", saw Bush witnessing a murder and having to cooperate with police to catch the killer. After failing to leave an online footprint, the idea for the series was scrapped.

In 2023, it was announced that Bush had penned and performed "No Surrender", the theme song for the German–American martial arts film The Last Kumite, which was pitched as a throwback to the Cannon pictures he was involved with in the 1980s.

Bush partnered with Lenny Macaluso on an 80s-style rock anthem titled "Happy Birthday Dire Wolf" to celebrate the first birthday of the male wolves created by Colossal Biosciences.

== Discography ==
=== Albums ===
==== Solo albums ====
- Stan Bush (1983)
- Every Beat of My Heart (1993)
- Dial 818888-8638 (1994)
- Higher Than Angels (1996, Japan only)
- The Child Within (1996)
- Merry Christmas & A Happy New Year (1998)
- Language of the Heart (2001)
- Shine (2004)
- In this Life (2007)
- Dream the Dream (2010)
- The Ultimate (2014)
- Change the World (2017)
- Dare to Dream (2020)
- Born for Battle (2025)

==== Compilation albums ====
- Call to Action (1997)
- Til All Are One (with Vince DiCola) (1997)
- Capture the Dream – The Best of Stan Bush (1999)

==== Extended plays ====
- Shadow Warrior 2: The Warrior EP (2016)

==== Box sets ====
- The Collection (2021)

=== Singles ===
==== As lead artist ====
- "Never Surrender" (1989)
- "Forever" (1990)
- "Can't Hide Love" (1992)
- "Free and Easy" (1993)
- "In the Name of Love" (1994)
- "Capture the Dream" (1996)
- "Never Wanted to Fall" (1996)
- "’Til I Was Loved by You" (1997) (released with the title "Until I Was Loved by You")
- "The Touch – Sam's Theme" (2009)
- "The Touch (Power Mix)" (2012)
- "Thunder in Your Heart" (2013)
- "Warrior" (2016)
- "Born to Win" (2017)
- "The '80s" (2019)
- "Stand or Fall" (2021)
- "Freedom" (2024)
- "Invincible" (2025)

==== Promotional singles ====
- "Fire in My Heart" (1983)
- "All American Boy" (1983)
- "Time Isn't Changing You" (1984)
- "Every Beat of My Heart" (1993)
- "Are You Over Me" (1995)

==== Split singles ====
- Stan Bush: "The Touch" (Side A)/"Weird Al" Yankovic: "Dare to Be Stupid" (Side B) (1986)

=== With Boulder ===
==== Studio albums ====
- Boulder (1979)

==== Singles ====
- "Heartbeat" (1979)
- "Join Me in L.A." (1979)

=== With Stan Bush & Barrage ===
==== Studio albums ====
- Stan Bush & Barrage (1987)
- Heaven (1998)

==== Singles ====
- "Heart Vs. Head" (1987)
- "The Touch" (1987)
- "Love Don’t Lie" (1987)

==== Promotional singles ====
- "Crank that Radio" (1987)
