= Joan Stuart (actress) =

Canadian actress

- Born: 6 February 1937
- Died: October 30, 1996 (aged 59)
- Occupation: Actress
- Years active: 1959-1981

Joan Stuart (6 February 1937- 30 October 1996) was a Canadian actress, singer and dancer in television, film and theater.

Joan Stuart was an actress, known for Les femmes de 30 ans (1978), Comedy Cafe (1970) and Just Ask, Inc. (1981).

== Biography ==
=== Theater ===
Joan Stuart played in "Up Tempo' 59", an off-beat musical revue, at Café André, 2077 Victoria St., Montreal for more than 20 week. There was two shows nightly. Sylvia Gillespie, Frank Blanche and Joan Stuart were among the top rank young actors in the cast.

In the summer of 1965, Joan Stuart played with Howard Ryshpan in the play The Tiger, written by Murray Schisgal, produced by Montreal Instant Theater for Piggery Playhouse Guild inc at "The Piggery-Summer Theater" in North Hatley, inaugurated on August 2, 1965. This play would be performed on Oct. 21, 1965 at the Canadian Institute, at the Canadian Women's Circle.

=== Television ===
- "A World of Music", 23 octobre 1960. Host: Wally Koster. Guess: Joan Stuart, Shirley Shaw and Doug Chamberlain.
- S2.E10 of The Littlest Hobo.

=== Radio ===
- In 1968, Stuart and Peter Cullen appeared as "Penelope" and "Giles" in L'Anglaise, a recurring segment about a French-Canadian man with an English-Canadian wife, on the CBC Radio comedy series, Funny You Should Say That.

=== Filmography ===
1. Kiss (Short), 1981
2. Just Ask, Inc. (TV Series), acting as Lustra
3. Les femmes de 30 ans, 1978, acting as aunt Alice
4. Nic and Pic (TV Series), 1975, acting as Nic (English version, voice)
5. Tiki Tiki, 1971 (voice)
6. Zut!, 1970, (TV Series)
7. Comedy Cafe, 1970, (TV Series)
8. Comedy Crackers, 1970 (TV Series)
9. Once Upon a Prime Time, 1966 (Short).

=== Self credit ===
1. Tee-Won Short, Episode #1, 1970 (Documentary short)
2. Tee-Won Short, Episode #2, 1970 (Documentary short)
3. Comedy Crackers (TV Series), 1970. Note: Episode dating from March 4, 1970.
