= Let's Call the Whole Thing Orff =

- Genre: Comedy
- Written by: Al Boliska; David Harriman
- Starring: Barrie Baldaro
- Country of origin: Canada
- Original language: English
- No. of seasons: 1

Production
- Executive producer: Bill Weston
- Production location: Montreal
- Running time: 30 minutes

Original release
- Network: CBC Television
- Release: 18 September 1971 – 20 May 1972

Let's Call the Whole Thing Orff is a Canadian comedy television series that aired on CBC Television from 1971 to 1972.

== Premise ==
This Montreal-produced series derived its title from a Toronto Telegram quotation by television columnist Bob Blackburn who suggested a television series name in one of his columns. This was a spin-off from CBC Radio's Funny You Should Say That, although Let's Call the Whole Thing Orff featured only Barrie Baldaro from that radio series unlike the heavier cast reliance for other spin-offs such as Comedy Cafe, Comedy Crackers, and Zut!.

Series regulars were Barrie Baldaro, Andrée Boucher, Yvan Ducharme, Peggy Mahon, Wally Martin and Terrence G. Ross with songs by France Castel and Diane Dufresne. Sketches often concerned the differences between English and French Canadian culture and relied on rapidly executed material. Francois Cousineau conducted the house band.

== Scheduling ==
This half-hour series was broadcast Saturdays at 7:00 p.m. (Eastern) from 18 September 1971 to 20 May 1972.
