= Transformers Hall of Fame =

Hasbro honor for Transformers franchise contributors

The official Transformers Hall of Fame was created by Hasbro to honor the most distinguished people behind the Transformers toy and entertainment franchise, along with some of the more popular Transformers characters. The Hall of Fame contains 32 characters and 22 humans as of April 2022.

== Selection process ==
Each year, Hasbro selects which individuals will be inducted into the human portion of the Hall of Fame. Hasbro also selects certain characters which it feels are deserving of enshrining in the Transformers portion of the Hall of Fame. For the purposes of the Hall of Fame, characters are not differentiated between the different continuities. Character biographies tend to reflect the characters as they are represented in Hasbro's current unified continuity.

Hasbro solicits additional nominations from various Transformers fan sites for the Fans' Choice Inductee. The top five nominees are eligible for election to the Hall of Fame, and voting takes place in April on the official Transformers website. The winner is announced at the Hall of Fame Induction Ceremony.

== Induction ceremony ==
The Hall of Fame Induction Ceremony occurs each year at BotCon, the official Transformers fan convention. The event is semi-formal, with inductees and presenters in formal attire, with attendees in business casual attire. In 2010, the ceremony was a dinner held at the Walt Disney World Swan and Dolphin Resorts and Convention Center in Lake Buena Vista, Florida. The 2011 ceremony was held at the Pasadena Convention Center in Pasadena, California.

Each human inductee is awarded a trophy, depicting Optimus Prime holding up the Matrix of Leadership, and is allowed to make an acceptance speech. Each character inducted, and each Fans' Choice finalist, is honored with a music video. (Erector was honored with a mockumentary, rather than a music video.) The Fans' Choice Inductee is revealed with a music video set to "The Touch."

== Inductees ==
=== Human inductees ===
| Inductee | Class | Contribution |
|---|---|---|
| Bob Budiansky | 2010 | Writer of the original Marvel Transformers comics and most of the Generation One character profiles. |
| Peter Cullen | 2010 | Long-serving voice actor of Optimus Prime in several incarnations of the franchise, most notably The Transformers, Transformers Prime, and the film franchise. |
| Kōjin Ōno | 2010 | Designer of first Transformers toys. |
| Hideaki Yoke | 2010 | Takara's lead designer of Transformers. |
| Michael Bay | 2011 | Director of the first five Transformers live-action films. |
| Steven Spielberg | 2011 | Executive Producer of the live-action films. |
| Simon Furman | 2012 | Writer of a multitude of Transformers comics. |
| Chris Latta | 2012 | Voice actor for Starscream, Wheeljack, and Sparkplug Witwicky in The Transformers. |
| Stan Bush | 2014 | Songwriter and vocalist of several songs from The Transformers: The Movie. |
| Frank Welker | 2015 | Voice actor for several characters, most notably Megatron and Soundwave in The Transformers, Transformers Prime, and the film franchise. |
| Vince DiCola | 2015 | Composer of The Transformers: The Movie. |
| David Kaye | 2016 | Voice actor for several characters, most notably Megatron in Beast Wars, Beast Machines, and the Unicron Trilogy and Optimus Prime in Transformers Animated. |
| Judd Nelson | 2016 | Voice actor for Hot Rod in The Transformers: The Movie. |
| "Weird Al" Yankovic | 2016 | Songwriter of Dare to Be Stupid, featured on the soundtrack of The Transformers: The Movie; Voice actor for Wreck-Gar in Transformers Animated. |
| Susan Blu | 2017 | Voice actor for Arcee in The Transformers and Transformers Animated. Voice director for Beast Wars, Beast Machines, Transformers Animated and Transformers Prime. |
| Lorenzo di Bonaventura | 2017 | Producer of the live-action films. |
| John Barber | 2018 | Editor in Chief of IDW Publishing. Writer of a multitude of Transformers comics published by IDW. |
| Flint Dille | 2019 | Story editor and scriptwriter for The Transformers. |
| Takashi Kunihiro | 2019 | Takara Transformers toy designer. |
| Gregg Berger | 2020 | Voice actor for several characters, most notably Grimlock in The Transformers and subsequent media. |
| John Moschitta Jr. | 2021 | Voice actor for Blurr in The Transformers and Transformers Animated. |
| Guido Guidi | 2021 | Transformers comic artist for Dreamwave Productions and IDW Publishing. |
| Henry Orenstein | 2022 | Helped to bring the original toys to Hasbro in America over from Takara in Japan. |
| Takio Ejima | 2023 | Designed several Transformers toys. |
| Marcelo Matere | 2025 | Character designer & concept artist. |

=== Character inductees ===
| Inductee | Class | Continuity |
|---|---|---|
| Optimus Prime | 2010 | Multiple |
| Bumblebee | 2010 | Multiple |
| Megatron | 2010 | Multiple |
| Starscream | 2010 | Multiple |
| Dinobot | 2010 | Beast Wars |
| Soundwave | 2011 | Multiple |
| Ironhide | 2011 | Multiple |
| Ratchet | 2011 | Multiple |
| Waspinator | 2011 | Multiple |
| Grimlock | 2012 | Multiple |
| Jazz | 2012 | Multiple |
| Shockwave | 2012 | Multiple |
| Wheeljack | 2012 | Multiple |
| Beast Wars Megatron | 2013 | Beast Wars/Beast Machines |
| Ultra Magnus | 2013 | Multiple |
| Arcee | 2014 | Multiple |
| Rodimus Prime | 2014 | Multiple |
| Prowl | 2015 | Multiple |
| Predaking | 2015 | Multiple |
| Cosmos | 2016 | Multiple |
| Optimus Primal | 2016 | Beast Wars/Beast Machines |
| Galvatron | 2017 | Multiple |
| Barricade | 2017 | Movieverse |
| Trypticon | 2017 | Multiple |
| Blackarachnia | 2018 | Multiple |
| Battletrap | 2018 | Generation One |
| Skywarp | 2019 | Multiple |
| Omega Supreme | 2019 | Multiple |
| Knock Out | 2020 | Prime |
| Sky Lynx | 2020 | Generation One |
| Inferno | 2021 | Beast Wars |
| Tigatron | 2021 | Beast Wars |
| Lugnut | 2022 | Multiple |
| Motormaster | 2022 | Generation One |
| Sky-Byte | 2023 | Multiple |
| Optimus Prime | 2023 | Unicron Trilogy |

== Fans' choice finalists ==
=== 2010 ===
| Inductee | Continuity |
|---|---|
| Dinobot | Beast Wars |
| Grimlock | Multiple |
| Jazz | Multiple |
| Shockwave | Multiple |
| Soundwave | Multiple |

=== 2011 ===
| Inductee | Continuity |
|---|---|
| Waspinator | Multiple |
| Erector | Generation 1 |
| Grimlock | Multiple |
| Jazz | Multiple |
| Shockwave | Multiple |

=== 2012 ===
| Inductee | Continuity |
|---|---|
| Wheeljack | Multiple |
| Arcee | Multiple |
| Beast Wars Megatron | Beast Wars/Beast Machines |
| Rodimus | Multiple |
| Sky-Byte | Multiple |

=== 2013 ===
| Inductee | Continuity |
|---|---|
| Prowl | Multiple |
| Arcee | Multiple |
| Beast Wars Megatron | Beast Wars/Beast Machines |
| Rodimus | Multiple |
| Ultra Magnus | Multiple |
