= Peter Cullen =

Canadian voice actor (1941–2026)

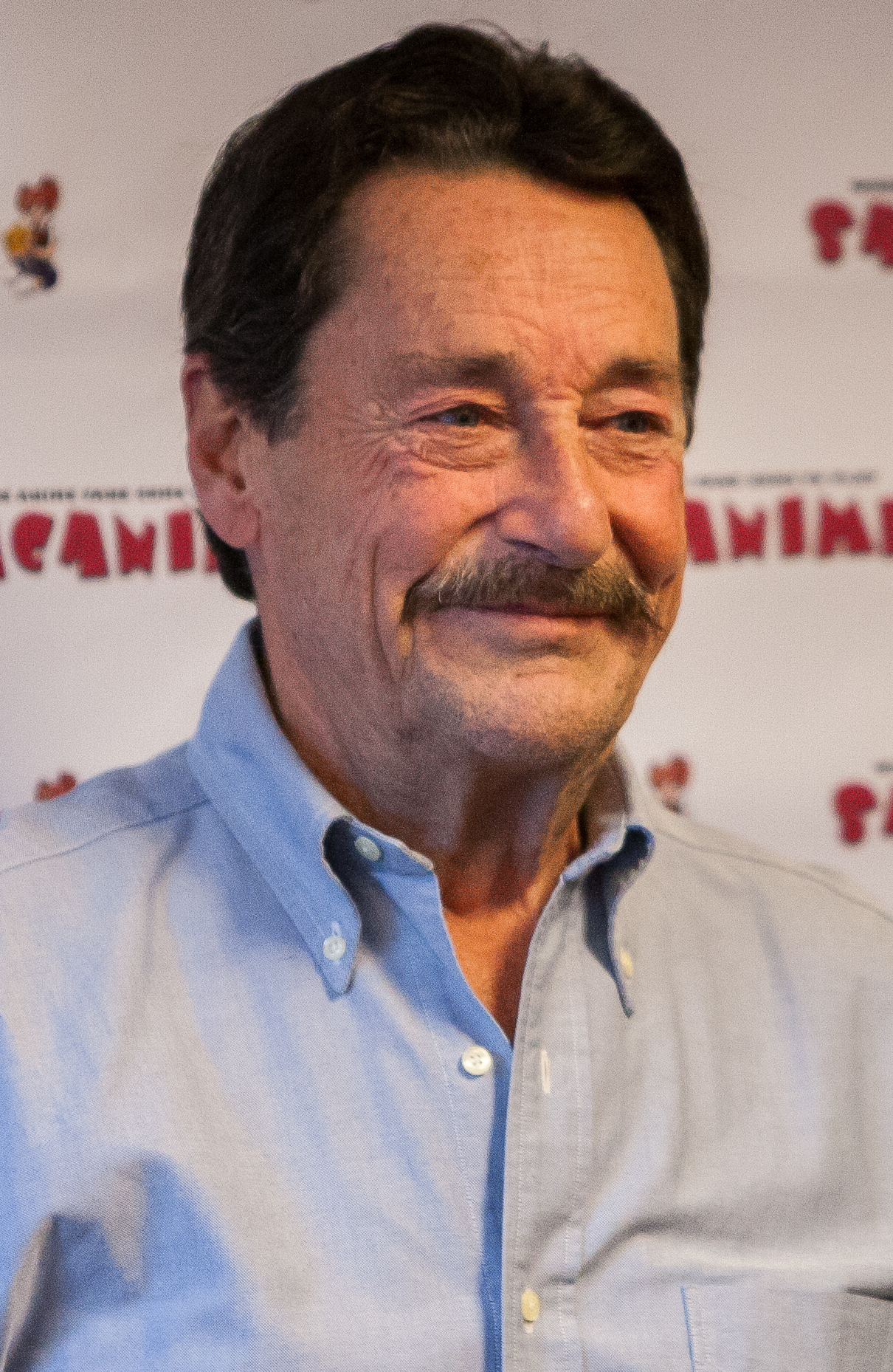
- Cullen in 2015
- Born: Peter Claver Cullen; July 28, 1941; Montreal, Quebec, Canada
- Died: August 26, 2026 (aged 85); Los Angeles, California, US
- Burial place: Forest Lawn Memorial Park, Hollywood Hills, California, US
- Education: National Theatre School (BFA)
- Occupation: Voice actor
- Years active: 1963–2026
- Spouses: Carol Ann Balmer (m. 1968; div. 1982) Brandi Cullen (before 2026)
- Children: 4
- Relatives: Molly Culver (daughter-in-law); Larry Cullen (brother); Alfred W. McCann (grandfather)

Peter Claver Cullen (July 28, 1941 – August 26, 2026) was a Canadian voice actor. He voiced Optimus Prime in the original 1980s Transformers animated series, later returning to the role in Transformers media in 2007, starting with the first live-action film. He also voiced many other characters across a wide variety of popular media, including Eeyore in the Winnie the Pooh franchise, Monterey Jack in Chip 'n Dale: Rescue Rangers, the first voice of KARR in Knight Rider and the vocalizations of the title character in Predator. He also voiced Thaedus in the animated series Invincible.

Cullen was presented with a Lifetime Achievement Award by the National Academy of Television Arts and Sciences in 2023 as part of the 2nd Children's and Family Emmy Awards.

== Early life ==
Peter Claver Cullen was born on July 28, 1941 in Montreal, Quebec, Canada. His father Henry Laurence Cullen (1905 – 1971) was from Boston, Massachusetts and his mother Muriel Margaret (née McCann) Cullen (1907 – 1973) was from Providence, Rhode Island and also grew up in Yonkers and New York City. Cullen's family was of Irish descent, and he had three siblings. Cullen's father was the founder and President of Canadian Overseas Paper Company, Ltd and also served as Senior Vice President and director of the International Paper Sales Company. His mother was a graduate of the American Academy of Dramatic Arts. His maternal grandfather was Alfred W. McCann who was a muckraking journalist.

Cullen spent his early childhood living in Montreal. Growing up, he spent his summers on his aunts farm in New York. He said he used to imitate the animals while working there on the farm and also used to imitate his teachers at school. Cullen's family later moved to Kingston, Ontario where he attended Regiopolis-Notre Dame Catholic High School. He was part of the first graduating class of the National Theatre School of Canada, completing his studies in 1963. His brother, Larry Cullen, a retired captain in the United States Marine Corps, helped inspire Cullen's later voice performance as Optimus Prime.

== Career ==
=== 1963–1970 ===
Following his graduation, Cullen worked for a year as part of the Crest Theatre Foundation repertory company. Finding the dramatic stagework too serious for him, he quit the theatre and returned to Montreal, where he spent a year working in a gas station to "get back to his roots." During this time, he performed in comedic, musical stage plays, beginning with the 1964 revue Up Tempo.

In late 1964 and early 1965, Cullen landed his first television jobs, performing in plays for TV in one episode of Action Theatre and two episodes of Shoestring Theatre. In Spring 1965, he performed in another comedy musical titled Mon'ey, during which he befriended his co-star, American comedian and local children's TV star Ted Zeigler. The two men became fast friends and formed a comedy partnership. From February to December 1966, Cullen worked a steady job as the host of the "Milkman's Matinee" overnight program on radio station CKGM, but would leave the job a few months after landing his first recurring TV role in Zeigler's new 1966 series, Johnny Jellybean and Friends, which aired every weekday on Montreal's CFCF-TV from August 1966 to March 1967. The two men teamed again for the 1967–1968 show, The Buddies, in which Cullen played a French-Canadian astronaut character named Commander Bi Bi Latuque.

From 1967 to 1971 Cullen and Zeigler teamed with actors Joan Stuart and Barry Baldaro to form the cast of CBC Radio 's new sketch comedy series, Funny You Should Say That. Cullen and Stuart notably performed the show's most popular sketch, L'Anglaise, as French-Canadian man Giles and his English-Canadian wife Penelope. The radio show would spawn numerous TV spin offs—1969's Comedy Cafe, 1970's Comedy Crackers, and 1970-71's Zut!—in which Cullen featured.

Cullen is widely but incorrectly credited as having been the announcer of Los Angeles-filmed series The Smothers Brothers Comedy Hour during these years; in fact, the announcer of this series was Roger Carroll, and it completed its entire 1967–1969 run before Cullen ever left his native Canada.

=== 1971–1980 ===
In 1971, Cullen was signed by Schlatter-Friendly Productions to star in a pilot for a new comedy series, It's a Wacky World, for NBC which led to him relocating to Los Angeles. The pilot bombed and the series wasn't picked up, but Cullen was able to instead secure work as both announer and on-screen performer on The Sonny & Cher Comedy Hour, on which he appeared from 1971 to 1974 alongside his old co-star Zeigler. From 1974 to 1975, he, Zeigler and fellow Sonny & Cher performer Billy Van were regulars on The Hudson Brothers Razzle Dazzle Show, which Cullen also narrated.

On-screen work for Cullen would lessen after this; subsequent on-camera roles included a recurring part as the character "Luke Warm" on the short-lived summer 1975 series Down Home Country on the CBC back in Canada, a brief appearance in the 1978 TV film Ringo, and his last known screen credit, the CBC Halloween special "Boo!" in 1980. During these years, he would expand into voiceover work, including a commercial for Betty Crocker Snackin' Cakes, and the 1977 album, "The Story of Halloween Horror," until eventually, he decided to give up on-camera work and focus entirely on voice work, after being approached by talent agent Steve Tisherman who offered to represent him if he would dedicate "one hundred percent of his time" to voiceover.

=== As Optimus Prime ===
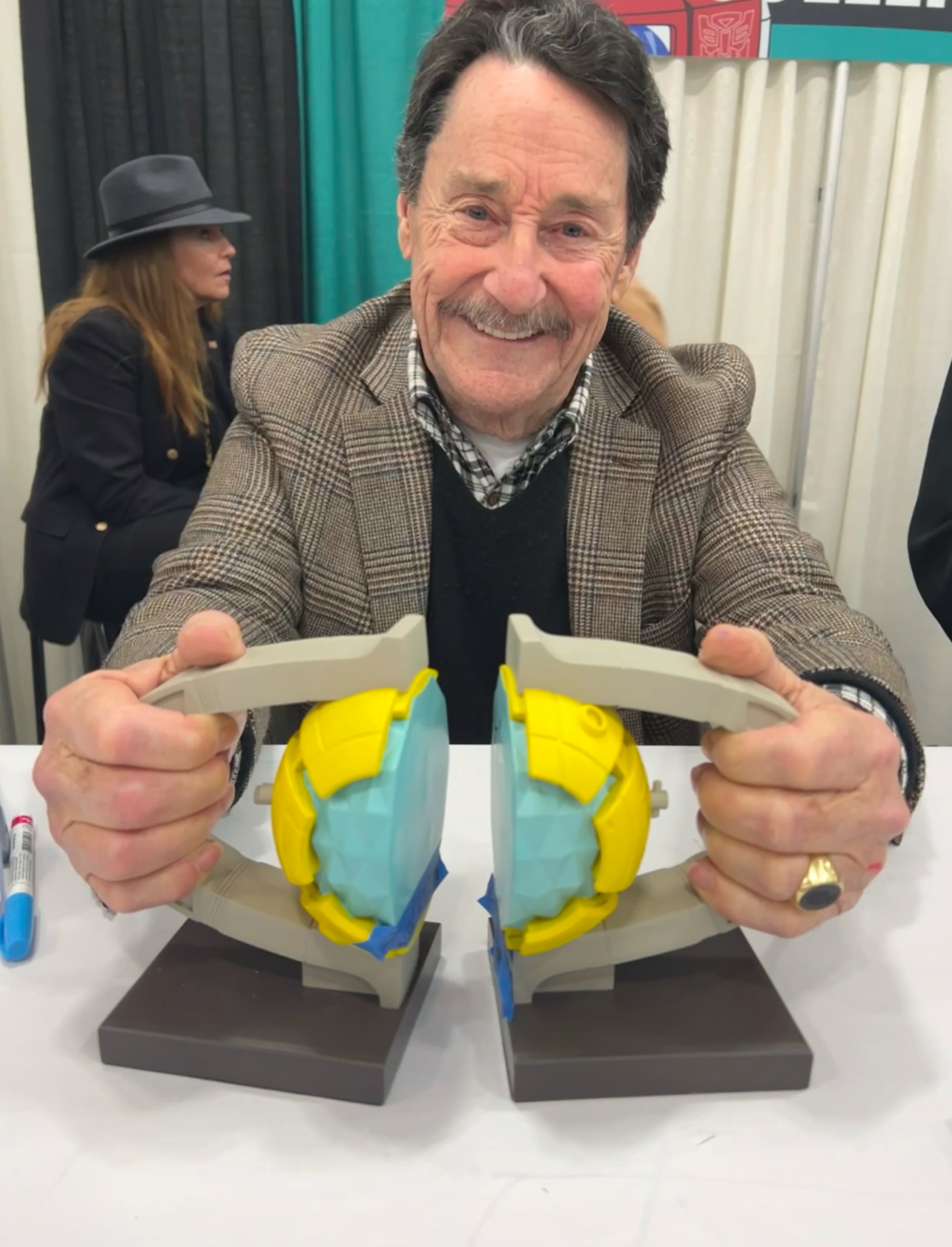
Peter Cullen holds a toy Matrix of Leadership at a convention in Portland in 2024.

Cullen recalled auditioning for the role of the robot character Optimus Prime at a casting house in Burbank, California, explaining that as he read Prime's character breakdown, he saw that it was "the opportunity of the year", and heeded his brother Larry's advice: "Peter, don't be a Hollywood hero, be a real hero. Real heroes don't yell and act tough; they're tough enough to be gentle, so control yourself." Cullen later learned from his agent, Steve Tisherman, that he not only won the part of Prime, but also, to his surprise, the role of Ironhide as well, which he saw as a "home run".

He stated that Optimus was his favorite voice role, and that he based the voice of the Autobot leader on his older brother Larry, who served in Vietnam. "When he came home, I could see a change. He was quieter and he was a man and a superhero to me," says the actor. "I watched him and listened to him. I'd never had an opportunity to do a superhero, and when that came, [that voice] just came right out of me and I sounded like Optimus."

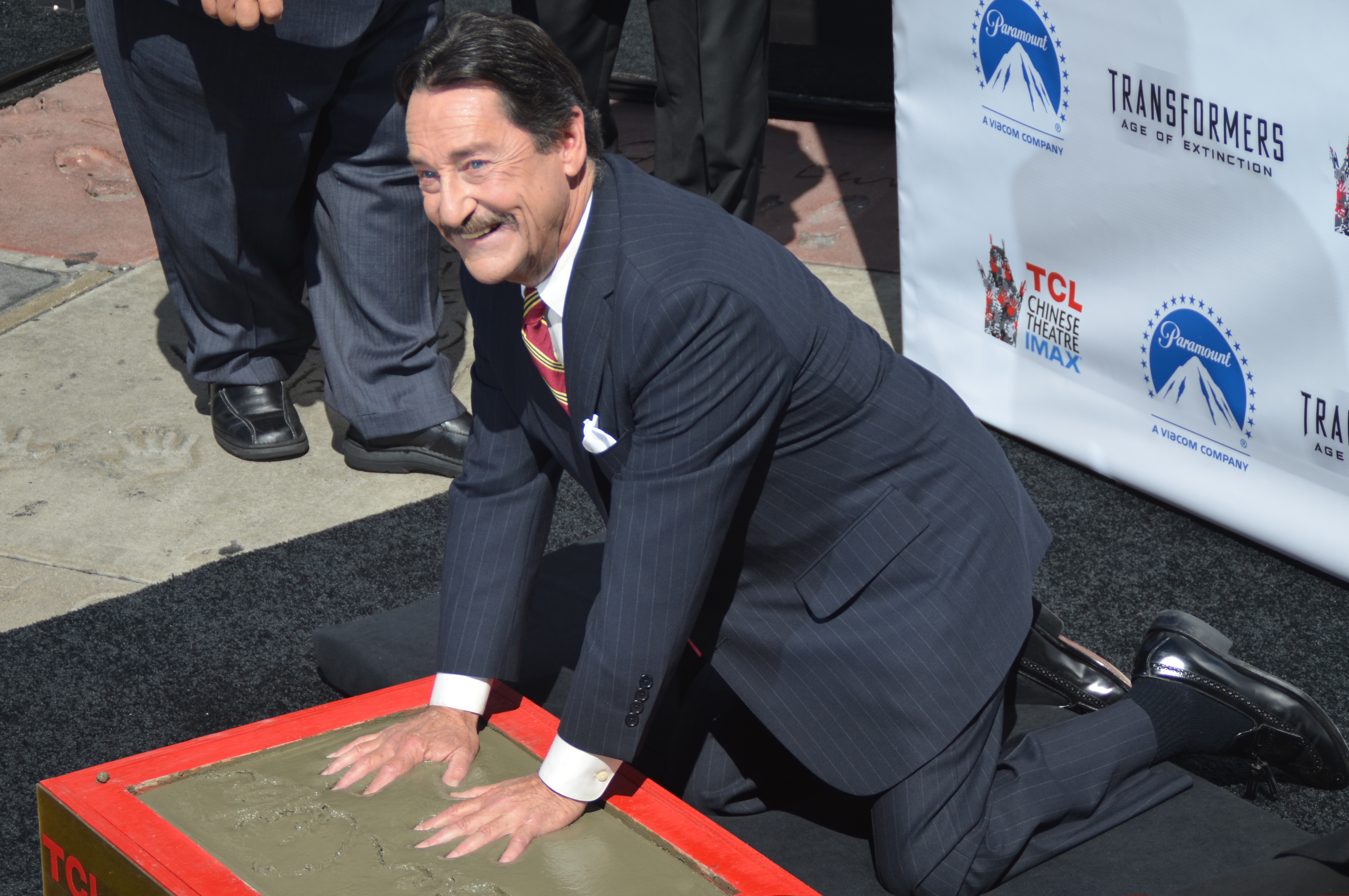
Cullen putting his handprints in wet concrete at the Optimus Prime Chinese Theatre Handprint Ceremony in 2014

Cullen also stated that he had no idea of Prime's popularity until the character's controversial death in the 1986 animated film, because the studio had never given him fan letters from children addressed to Optimus. The public backlash over Optimus's death surprised producers greatly. Children were leaving the theaters distraught because of the character's death. The writers temporarily revived the character for a single episode in Season 3 called "Dark Awakening". Initially, this was intended to be his final appearance, but after fan requests continued, "The Return of Optimus Prime", a two-part episode was produced. The original ending of "Dark Awakening" was altered in reruns to include a teaser about the return of the character, and indeed, Optimus returned once and for all to lead the Autobots for the final five episodes of the original American cartoon series.

He reprised the role of Optimus Prime in the 2007 Transformers live-action film, the sequels Revenge of the Fallen, Dark of the Moon, Age of Extinction and The Last Knight, Bumblebee and Rise of the Beasts and the video games based on the film series. Though he was only contractually obligated to voice Optimus up to The Last Knight, producer Lorenzo di Bonaventura stated in 2021 that Cullen was welcome to voice the character for as long as he wanted. His final performance as the character would be Optimus Prime: Awakening in 2026.

Cullen again reprised his role as Optimus Prime in the video games Transformers: War for Cybertron, Transformers: Fall of Cybertron and Transformers: Devastation, and in the television series Transformers: Rescue Bots, Transformers: Prime and Transformers: Robots in Disguise. His performance in the premiere season of Transformers: Prime earned him a nomination for a 2011 Daytime Emmy Award in the Outstanding Performer in an Animated Program category.

=== Other work ===
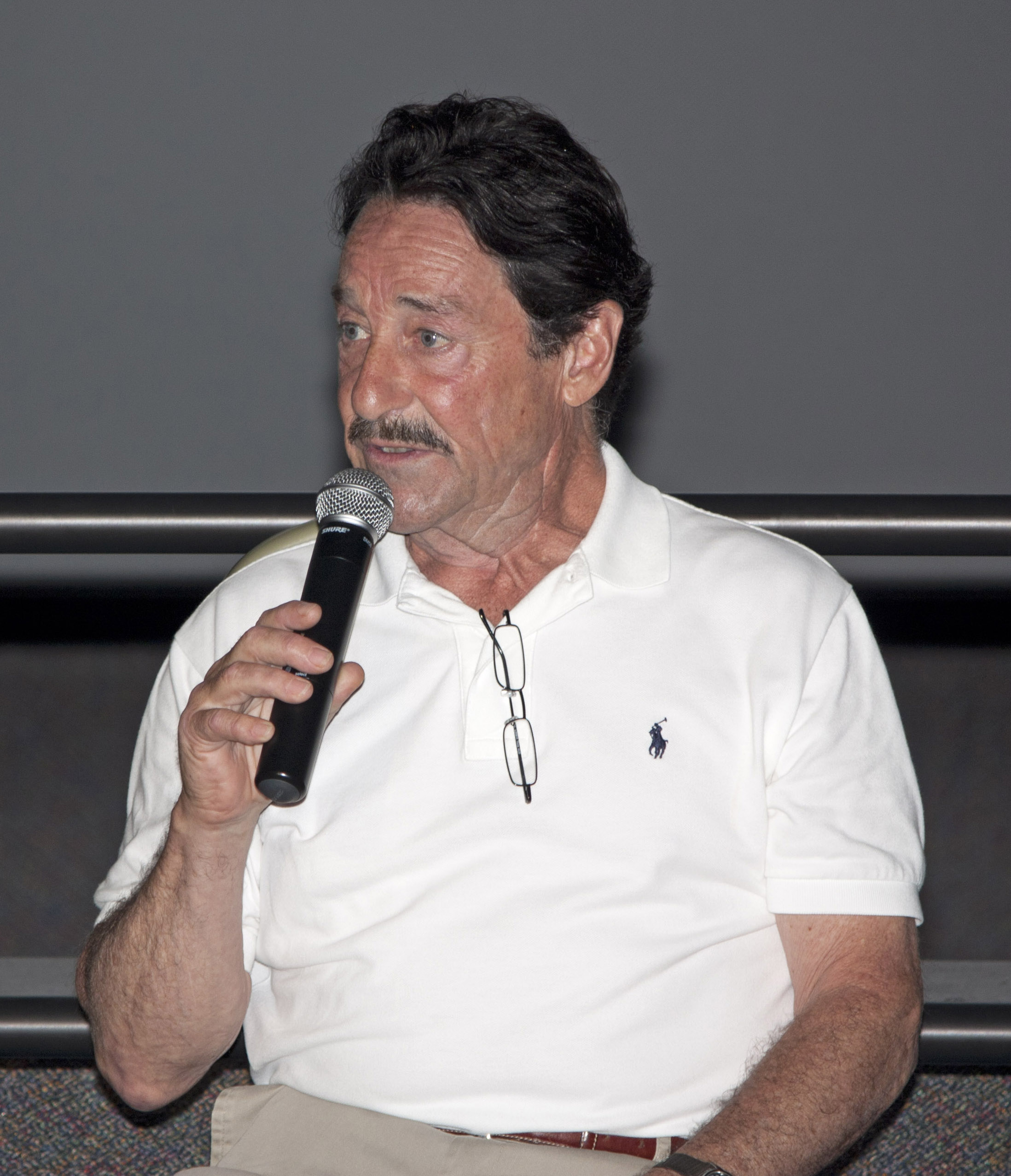
Cullen in 2011

In the 1980s to the 1990s, Cullen appeared on a number of television shows. He had played Coran, Stride the Tiger Fighter, and King Alfor in the Lion Voltron series, the transforming spaceship/robot Ramrod, the heroic Commander Eagle and the villainous Nemesis in the 1980s anime series Saber Rider and the Star Sheriffs, Commander James Hawkins in the Vehicle Voltron series, Eeyore in the Winnie the Pooh franchise, the original voice of KARR in Knight Rider, Antor and Bomba, and Gunner, in Dino-Riders, Airborne, Zandar and Nemesis Enforcer in G.I. Joe. He played Mantor/Mantys in Coleco's 5 episode mini-series Sectaurs in 1986; Red Skull in Spider-Man (1981), Klaar and Zanzoar in Megas XLR and Mantus in The Pirates of Dark Water. He also had a voice part in the 1984 motion picture Gremlins (as a gremlin) and in the first season of the 2008 Knight Rider series, where he reprised his vocal role as KARR (from the original Knight Rider series). He also did voicework in The Greatest Adventure: Stories from the Bible series, notably as Japheth, one of Noah's sons in the "Noah's Ark" episode, and the King of Nineveh in the "Jonah" episode. He was well-known by some as the main villain Venger in the animated series of Dungeons & Dragons. He played the evil sorcerer Renwick in Little Wizards and Cindarr in Visionaries: Knights of the Magical Light.

Among many other television series and films, he also lent his basso voice to many film trailers and television commercials, including announcing for the Toonami and You Are Here blocks on the Cartoon Network.

He voiced Nintendo's mascot Mario in the Donkey Kong segments on the 1983–1984 TV series Saturday Supercade, making him the first person to ever provide a voice for the character in western media.

Cullen did voicework on the 2004 album The Dungeonmaster's Guide by Dieselboy, and narration on the 2013 album Tetragrammaton by the Dutch extreme metal band The Monolith Deathcult. Additionally, he did voicework for the unreleased Blizzard Entertainment game Warcraft Adventures: Lord of the Clans, and provided narration for the Star Wars fan film series I.M.P.S.: The Relentless.

Cullen was a voice announcer on Police Story 4: First Strike in advertisements for New Line Cinema.

He also did voice work for promotions of the 1999 film The Iron Giant. In 2023, he joined season 2 of the Amazon Originals series Invincible.

== Personal life and death ==
Cullen was Catholic. Cullen married former Miss Canada Carol Ann Balmer in 1968, with whom he had two children, Clay (born 1971) and Claire (born 1977). The couple divorced in 1982.

Cullen would later remarry and have two further children, Angus and Pilar, with his wife Brandi Cullen. At the time of his death, he had three grandchildren.

Cullen died of cardiac arrest complicated by respiratory arrest and lung cancer at his home in Los Angeles, California, on August 26, 2026, at the age of 85. He was buried at Forest Lawn Memorial Park in Hollywood Hills on September 9. Many fans and co-stars paid tributes to Cullen.

== Honours ==
At BotCon 2010, Hasbro named Cullen as one of the first four human inductees in the Transformers Hall of Fame for his role as the voice of Optimus Prime.

== Filmography ==
=== Film ===
List of acting and voice performances in feature films
Year	Title	Role	Notes	Ref.
1971	Tiki Tiki			
1976	King Kong	King Kong (voice) (Note: Roars of this King Kong were also reused for Gamera in the 2006 film Gamera the Brave.)	Uncredited	
1982	Heidi's Song	Gruffle (voice)		
1983	Deck the Halls with Wacky Walls	Big Blue (voice)		
1984	Gallavants	Antonim (voice)		
1984	Voyage of the Rock Aliens	1359 (voice)		
1984	Gremlins	Special Vocal Effects		
1985	Robotix	Additional Voices		
1985	Rainbow Brite and the Star Stealer	Murky Dismal, Castle Monster, Glitterbot, Guard, Skydancer, Slurthie (voices)		
1986	Voltron: Fleet of Doom	Hutch, Commander James Hawkins, Coran, King Alfor, Narrator (voices)		
1986	GoBots: Battle of the Rock Lords	Pincher, Tombstone, Stones (voices)		
1986	My Little Pony: The Movie	Grundle, Ahgg (voices)		
1986	The Transformers: The Movie	Optimus Prime, Ironhide (voices)		
1986	King Kong Lives	King Kong (voice)		
1987	G.I. Joe: The Movie	Zandar, Nemesis Enforcer, Scientist (voices)		
1987	Predator	The Predator (voices)		
1988	Rockin' with Judy Jetson	Gruff, Commander Comsat, Bouncer (voices)		
1988	Yogi and the Invasion of the Space Bears	Ranger Roubideux (voice)		
1989	Vytor: The Starfire Champion	Myzor, Chief Eldor (voices)		
1991	The Little Engine That Could	Pete the Big Strong Freight Train, Cave (voices)		
1994	The Story of Christmas	Ox (voice)		
1997	Pooh's Grand Adventure: The Search for Christopher Robin	Eeyore (voice)		
1999	Seasons of Giving	Eeyore (voice)	Archive sound	
2000	The Tigger Movie	Eeyore (voice)		
2001	The Book of Pooh: Stories from the Heart	Eeyore (voice)		
2001	Mickey's Magical Christmas: Snowed in at the House of Mouse	Eeyore (voice)		
2002	A Very Merry Pooh Year	Eeyore (voice)		
2002	Treasure Planet	Captain Nathaniel Flint (voice)	Uncredited	
2003	Piglet's Big Movie	Eeyore (voice)		
2004	Winnie the Pooh: Springtime with Roo	Eeyore (voice)		
2005	Pooh's Heffalump Movie	Eeyore (voice)		
2005	Pooh's Heffalump Halloween Movie	Eeyore (voice)		
2007	Transformers	Optimus Prime (voice)		
2007	Super Sleuth Christmas Movie	Eeyore (voice)		
2009	Tigger & Pooh and a Musical Too	Eeyore (voice)		
2009	Transformers: Revenge of the Fallen	Optimus Prime (voice)		
2010	Super Duper Super Sleuths	Eeyore (voice)		
2011	Transformers: Dark of the Moon	Optimus Prime (voice)		
2014	Transformers: Age of Extinction	Optimus Prime (voice)		
2017	Transformers: The Last Knight	Optimus Prime / Nemesis Prime (voice)		
2018	Bumblebee	Optimus Prime (voice)		
2023	Transformers: Rise of the Beasts	Optimus Prime (voice)	Final feature film role	
2026	Optimus Prime: Awakening	Optimus Prime (voice)	Posthumous release; short film; final performance as Optimus Prime; dedicated in memory	

=== Television ===
List of acting and voice performances in television shows
Year	Title	Role	Notes	Ref.
1964	Action Theatre		1 episode	
1965	Shoestring Theatre			
1967	The Buddies	Commander Bi Bi Latuque		
1974	The Bobbie Gentry Show	Announcer		
1979	Mighty Man and Yukk	Brandon Brewster / Mighty Man (voice)		
1979	Scooby-Doo and Scrappy-Doo	Additional Voices		
1981	The Kwicky Koala Show	Bristletooth (voice; "Crazy Claws" segment)		
1981	The Smurfs	Additional Voices		
1981	Spider-Man and His Amazing Friends	Dr. Bruce Banner / Hulk, Mysterio, Red Skull (voices)	2 episodes	
1982	The Scooby & Scrappy-Doo/Puppy Hour	Lucky (voice)		
1982	Spider-Man	Red Skull, Stuntman, Jack Riven (voices)		
1982	Meatballs & Spaghetti	Additional Voices		
1982	Pac-Man	Sour Puss (voice)		
1982	The Little Rascals	Officer Ed, Pete the Pup		
1982	Knight Rider	K.A.R.R.	1st voice; Episode: "Trust Doesn't Rust"	
1983	Monchhichis	Shreeker, Snitchitt, Gonker (voices)		
1983	The Puppy's Further Adventures	Lucky (voice)		
1983	The Biskitts	Dog Foot, Fang, Scratch (voices)		
1983	Saturday Supercade	Mario (voice)	Donkey Kong segments	
1983	The Dukes	Foreign Agent		
1983–85	Mister T	Additional Voices		
1983–85	Dungeons & Dragons	Venger, The Darkling (voices)		
1984	Dragon's Lair	Bertram, Sir Hubert Blunt, Walker (voices)		
1984	Heathcliff and the Catillac Cats	Boom Boom Pussini, Max, Pop, Additional Voices		
1984	Snorks	Additional Voices		
1984	Voltron: Defender of the Universe	Coran, King Alfor, Narrator (voices)		
1984–86	Rainbow Brite	Murky Dismal, Narrator, Monstromurk, Skydancer (voices)		
1984–85	Alvin and the Chipmunks	Additional Voices		
1984–85	Lucky Luke	Additional Voices	English dub	
1984–87	The Transformers	Optimus Prime, Ironhide, Streetwise, Wingspan, Slugslinger, Nightstick (voices)	Main role	
1985	The 13 Ghosts of Scooby-Doo	Maldor the Malevolent, Sandy (voices)	2 episodes	
1985	Challenge of the GoBots	Spoiler, Tank, Pincher (voices)		
1985	The Super Powers Team: Galactic Guardians	Felix Faust (voices)	Episode: "The Case of the Stolen Super Powers"	
1985	Bigfoot and the Muscle Machines	Arthur Ravenscroft (voice)		
1985–86	G.I. Joe: A Real American Hero	Airborne, Ramar, Zandar (voices)	Main role	
1985–87	The Jetsons	Additional Voices		
1986	MoonDreamers	Igon, Additional voices	Main role	
1986	Rambo: The Force of Freedom	Sergeant Havoc	Main role	
1986	Muppet Babies	Sor-Elbow, Smoggy the Bear, Football Bear (voices)	Episode: "Fozzie's Family Tree"	
1986	Ghostbusters	Eddie Spenser Jr., Eddie Spenser Sr., Haunter, Floatzart (voices)		
1986	Pound Puppies	Captain Slaughter (voice)	4 episodes	
1986	The New Adventures of Jonny Quest	Patch (voice)	Episode: "Peril of the Reptilian"	
1986	Foofur	Baby the Rat (voice)	Main role	
1986	My Little Pony	Captain Crabnasty (voice)	Episode: "Fugitive Flowers"	
1987–88	BraveStarr	Dr. Watson, Mr. Fogg (voices)		
1987–88	DuckTales	Admiral Grimitz, Bankjob Beagle, Mad Dog McGirk, Lessdred (voices)	Recurring role; 19 episodes	
1987	Little Wizards	Renwick, Various characters		
1987	The Real Ghostbusters	Doctor Destructo, Police Officer (voices)	Episode: "Captain Steel Saves the Day"	
1987	Visionaries: Knights of the Magical Light	Cindarr (voice)		
1987–89	Saber Rider and the Star Sheriffs	Commander Eagle, Narrator, Nemesis (voices)		
1988	Dino-Riders	Gunner, Antor, Bomba (voices)	Main role	
1988	The Wonderful World of Disney	The Sorcerer	Episode: "Mickey's 60th Birthday"	
1988–89	The New Yogi Bear Show	Ranger Roubideux (voices)	Main role	
1988–89	Teenage Mutant Ninja Turtles	Smash, Mugger, Napoleon (voices)		
1988–91	The New Adventures of Winnie the Pooh	Eeyore (voice)	Main role	
1988–90	Adventures of the Gummi Bears	Kerwin the Conqueror, Gritty (voices)		
1989	Rude Dog and the Dweebs	Herman, Winston (voices)	Main role	
1989–90	Chip 'n Dale: Rescue Rangers	Monterey Jack (season 1), Mepps, Officer Kirby, Officer Muldoon, additional voices	Main role	
1990	TaleSpin	Additional Voices	Episode: "It Came from Beneath the Sea Duck"	
1990–93	Tom & Jerry Kids	Additional Voices		
1990–92	Tiny Toon Adventures	Additional Voices		
1990–91	Widget the World Watcher	Bob the Poacher, Rooney Kangaroo, Gdunu (voices)		
1991–93	The Pirates of Dark Water	Mantus (voice)	Main role	
1993	Bonkers	Abominable Snowman, Mackey McSlime (voice)		
1994	Hardball	Fox Announcer (voice)	Episode: "Lee's Bad, Bad Day"	
1996	Boo to You Too! Winnie the Pooh	Eeyore (voice)		
2001	House of Mouse	Eeyore (voice)		
2001–02	The Book of Pooh	Eeyore (voice)		
2004–05	Megas XLR	Zanzoar, Klaar (voices)		
2005–06	IGPX: Immortal Grand Prix	Narrator		
2007–10	My Friends Tigger & Pooh	Eeyore (voice)		
2009	Knight Rider	K.A.R.R. (voice)	Episode: "Knight in King's Pawn"	
2009	Bizarre Dinosaurs	Narrator	U.S. version	
2010–13	Transformers: Prime	Optimus Prime / Orion Pax, Nemesis Prime, Vehicon (voice)		
2011–16	Transformers: Rescue Bots	Optimus Prime (voice)		
2013	Transformers Prime Beast Hunters: Predacons Rising	Optimus Prime (voice)		
2014	2014 Kids' Choice Awards	Optimus Prime (voice)		
2015–17	Transformers: Robots in Disguise	Optimus Prime (voice)		
2017	Doc McStuffins	Eeyore (voice)	Episode: "Into the Hundred Acre Wood"	
2017–18	Transformers: Titans Return	Optimus Prime (voice)		
2018	The Toys That Made Us	Himself Optimus Prime (voice)		
2018	Transformers: Power of the Primes	Optimus Prime (voice)		
2019	Rise of the Teenage Mutant Ninja Turtles	Yōkai Councillor #1 (voice)	3 episodes	
2021	Family Guy	Archival Recording of The Hudson Brothers Razzle Dazzle Show (Uncredited: Season 19, Episode 12 "And Then There’s Fraud")		
2023–27	Invincible	Thaedus (voice)	Recurring role; 7 episodes; final role overall	
2024	The Masked Singer	Optimus Prime (voice)	Episode: "Transformers Night"; final TV role; final TV show as Optimus Prime	

=== Video games ===
List of voice performances in video games
Year	Title	Voice role	Notes	Ref.
2003	Piglet's Big Game	Eeyore		
2007	Transformers: The Game	Optimus Prime		
2007	Transformers Autobots	Optimus Prime		
2009	Transformers: Revenge of the Fallen	Optimus Prime		
2009	Transformers Revenge of the Fallen: Autobots	Optimus Prime		
2010	Transformers: War for Cybertron	Optimus Prime		
2010	Transformers: Cybertron Adventures	Optimus Prime		
2011	Transformers: Dark of the Moon	Optimus Prime		
2012	Transformers: Fall of Cybertron	Optimus Prime		
2012	Transformers: Prime – The Game	Optimus Prime		
2014	Transformers: Rise of the Dark Spark	Optimus Prime		
2015	Transformers: Devastation	Optimus Prime		
2016	Transformers: Earth Wars	Optimus Prime		
2016	Disney Magical World 2	Eeyore		
2019	Crystal Crisis	Narrator		
2023	Fortnite Battle Royale	Optimus Prime	Final video game role; final video game as Optimus Prime	

=== Theatre ===
List of acting performances in stage shows
Year	Title	Role	Notes	Ref.
1964	Up Tempo			

=== Theme park rides ===
List of voice performances in theme park rides
Year	Title	Voice role	Notes	Ref.
2011	Transformers: The Ride – 3D	Optimus Prime	First and only theme park ride role; first and only theme park ride as Optimus Prime	

== Awards and nominations ==
Year	Award	Category	Nominated work	Result	Ref.
2011	Daytime Emmy Awards	Outstanding Performer in an Animated Program	Transformers Prime	Nominated	
2019	Voice Arts Awards	Lifetime Achievement Award	—N/a	Won	
2023	Children's and Family Emmy Awards	Lifetime Achievement Award	—N/a	Won	

== Notes ==
Preceded by Ron Gans	Voice of Eeyore; 1988–2017	Succeeded by Incumbent
Preceded by None	Voice of Optimus Prime; 1984–1988; Original series and animated film	Succeeded by Neil Kaplan; 2001–2002; Robots in Disguise
Preceded by Garry Chalk; 2002–2006; Unicron Trilogy	Voice of Optimus Prime; 2007; Video game and live-action film	Succeeded by David Kaye; 2007–2009; Animated
Preceded by David Kaye; 2007–2009; Animated	Voice of Optimus Prime; 2009; Transformers: Revenge of the Fallen	Succeeded by none
Preceded by none	Voice of Optimus Prime; 2010–2013; Transformers: Prime	Succeeded by none
Preceded by none	Voice of Optimus Prime; 2011; Transformers: Dark of the Moon	Succeeded by none
Preceded by none	Voice of Optimus Prime; 2012–2016; Transformers: Rescue Bots	Succeeded by none
Preceded by none	Voice of Optimus Prime; 2014; Transformers: Age of Extinction	Succeeded by none
Preceded by none	Voice of Optimus Prime; 2015–2017; Transformers: Robots in Disguise	Succeeded by none
Preceded by none	Voice of Optimus Prime; 2017; Transformers: The Last Knight	Succeeded by none
Preceded by Jon Bailey; 2016; Transformers: Combiner Wars	Voice of Optimus Prime; 2017–2018; Transformers: Titans Return	Succeeded by none
Preceded by none	Voice of Optimus Prime; 2018; Transformers: Power of the Primes	Succeeded by none
Preceded by none	Voice of Optimus Prime; 2018; Bumblebee (film)	Succeeded by none
Preceded by None	Voice of Optimus Prime; 2023; Transformers: Rise of the Beasts	Succeeded by Chris Hemsworth
Preceded by none	Voice of Ironhide; Original series and animated film 1984–1986	Succeeded by Michael McConnohie; 2001–2002; Robots in Disguise
Preceded by None	Voice of Mario; 1983–1984; Saturday Supercade	Succeeded by Lou Albano; 1989–1990; Super Mario Brothers Super Show
Preceded by None	Voice of KARR; 1982; Knight Rider episode "Trust Doesn't Rust"	Succeeded by Paul Frees; 1984; Knight Rider episode "K.I.T.T. vs. K.A.R.R."
Preceded by Paul Frees; 1984; Knight Rider episode "K.I.T.T. vs. K.A.R.R."	Voice of KARR; 2009; Knight Rider episode "Knight to King's Pawn"	Succeeded by None
