= Diaclone =

Toyline

Diaclone (ダイアクロン, Daiakuron) is a toyline by Takara Toys launched in 1980. It consisted of transforming vehicles and robots piloted by miniature, magnet-shoed figures spin off from the prior Microman toyline. In 1984 the toys would be rebranded for the North America market creating the Transformers toyline.

== History ==
The toys in the 1980 line were designed by future Macross designers Shōji Kawamori and Kazutaka Miyatake (both contracted from Studio Nue), who designed the mecha and the figures respectively. Unlike Microman, which featured "full-scale" toys of its 10-centimeter-tall alien cyborgs, the figures in Diaclone represented full-sized human (and enemy alien Waruder) pilots, and were in approximately 1/60 scale.

In 1982, the line later featured the Car-Robots set of transforming robot toys, invented by Ōno Kōjin with some initial designs by Kawamori and others. While the original series featured fanciful robots and vehicles, Car-Robots added the feature of the robots being able to disguise themselves as various late 20th century-era contemporary vehicles. In 1984, Hasbro licensed the Car-Robots toyline along with the Microman's Micro Change toyline from Takara and merged the two series of toys to create the Transformers. Most of the original Autobot vehicle-based characters came from the Car-Robots set of Diaclone robots.

Other Transformers characters that came from the Diaclone line included the Dinobots, Insecticons (from the enemy Waruder toys), the Jumpstarters, the mail-order exclusive Powerdashers and Omnibots, the Decepticon planes (originally from two "JetRobo" toys, produced in the colors of future Decepticons Starscream and Thundercracker) and the Constructicons, who also came from the Car-Robots set. The Constructicons came from near the end of the series, at which point Takara was starting to abandon the Inch-Man pilot figures and being limited to the 1/60 scale. The six TrainRobo were also produced in the same sub-line as the Constructicons, but would only become Transformers (as the Trainbots) in Japan's 1987 line.

Takara eventually discontinued the Diaclone and Microman toylines in 1985 in favor of the Transformers rebranding. Takara has since revived the franchise, however, and the first proper figure of the new Diaclone line was revealed at Wonder Festival of 2015. The BotCon storyline for the same year also features several concepts from the Diaclone series, and several figures were based on Diaclone characters.
