= The Third Floor, Inc. =

American multimedia company

- Type: Private company
- Industry: Visual effects; Virtual reality
- Founded: 2004; 22 years ago
- Founders: Chris Edwards; Barry Howell; Eric Carney; Hiroshi Mori; Joshua Wassung; Nick Markel
- Headquarters: Los Angeles
- Area served: Worldwide
- Website: thethirdfloorinc.com

The Third Floor, Inc. is an American multimedia company based in Los Angeles. It was founded by a group of artists that collaborated on Star Wars: Episode III – Revenge of the Sith at Lucasfilm, and named the company after the location where they worked. The company has primarily focused on the previsualization aspect of film, television, game, and themed attraction production; however, as of the mid-2010s, it has been developing and applying expertise in virtual production to support visualization, motion capture, camera layout, and on-set shooting.

== Film and television ==
- RRR
- Shang-Chi and the Legend of the Ten Rings
- Godzilla vs. Kong
- Terminator: Dark Fate
- Chaos Walking
- Wonder Woman 1984
- Infinite
- The Tomorrow War
- Dolittle
- Black Widow
- Jungle Cruise
- Men in Black: International
- Red Notice
- Captain Marvel
- Gemini Man
- Godzilla: King of the Monsters
- Detective Pikachu
- Bumblebee
- Venom
- Avengers: Infinity War
- Star Wars: The Last Jedi
- Thor: Ragnarok
- Game of Thrones
- Spider-Man: Homecoming
- Beauty and The Beast
- Wonder Woman
- Black Sails
- Rogue One: A Star Wars Story
- The Jungle Book
- Fantastic Beasts and Where to Find Them
- Kong: Skull Island
- Mad Max: Fury Road
- Into the Storm
- Gravity
- 2.0
- Daredevil: Born Again
- Predator: Killer of Killers
- Optimus Prime: Awakening

== Games ==
- Destiny 2
- Gears of War 4
- Doom
- Lords of the Fallen
- Resident Evil 5
- Resident Evil 6
- Fortnite

== Theme Attractions ==
- Race Through New York Starring Jimmy Fallon
- Harry Potter and the Escape from Gringotts
- Skull Island: Reign of Kong
- Fast & Furious: Supercharged
- Despicable Me Minion Mayhem

== Awards ==
Year	Award	Category	Artist(s)	Subject	Reference(s)
2018	Visual Effects Society Award	Outstanding Virtual Cinematography in a Photoreal Project	Jim Baker & Steven Lo	Guardians of the Galaxy Vol. 2: "Groot Dance/Opening Fight"	
2015-2016	Emmy Award	Outstanding Special Visual Effects	Eric Carney & Michelle Blok	"Battle of the Bastards" episode of Game of Thrones	
2014-2015	Emmy Award	Outstanding Photoreal Episode	Eric Carney	"The Dance of Dragons" episode of Game of Thrones	
2013-2014	Emmy Award	Outstanding Special And Visual Effects	Eric Carney	"The Children (Game of Thrones)"	
2014	Visual Effects Society Award	Virtual Cinematography in a Live Action/Photoreal Motion Media Project	Austin Bonang & Casey Schatz	X-Men: Days of Future Past: "Kitchen Scene"	
2016	VES Award	Outstanding Visual Effects in a Photoreal Episode	Eric Carney	"The Dance of Dragons" episode of Game of Thrones	
2015	Themed Entertainment Association Award	Outstanding Achievement, Attraction	Barry Howell	Harry Potter and the Escape from Gringotts	
2015	Hollywood Post Alliance Award	Outstanding Visual Effects - Television	Eric Carney	"The Dance of Dragons" episode of Game of Thrones	
2016	Hollywood Post Alliance Award	Outstanding Visual Effects - Television	Eric Carney	"Battle of the Bastards" episode of Game of Thrones	
