= House Party (Australian TV series) =

- Genre: Variety
- Presented by: Ted Zeigler
- Country of origin: Australia
- Original language: English

Original release
- Network: HSV-7
- Release: 22 October 1959 – August 1960

House Party was an Australian television series which aired on Melbourne station HSV-7. The series debuted 22 October 1959 and ended circa 4 August 1960. It was a daytime variety series. The weekly series aired live.

Regulars varied during the run of the series, but included host Ted Zeigler (an American), June Finlayson, Jocelyn Terry, Brenda Marshall, Jean Battersby, John d'Arcy, Beryl Wright, Judd Laine, Elinor Gordon, and Graeme Bent.

Segments in one episode included Shopping Sleuth (with Mitta Hamilton), Dressmaking (with Dorothy Bradfield), Entertainment Review (with Jean Battersby), Cookery (with Elinor Gordon), Let's Figure it Out (with Beryl Wright and Mel Cowdrey), Disc Dizzy (with John d'Arcy), "Sundowner" Story (with Roy Lyons) and Murder Tale (with Raymond Singer).
