= Optimus Prime: Awakening =

2026 animated short film

- Release poster
- Directed by: Josh Wassung
- Written by: Ryan Parrott
- Based on: The Transformers by Hasbro and Takara
- Produced by: Zev Foreman; Cyrus Warner
- Starring: Peter Cullen; Frank Welker
- Edited by: Sean Rourke
- Music by: Bobby Krlic
- Production companies: The Third Floor, Inc. Hasbro Entertainment
- Distributed by: Hasbro; Fathom Entertainment
- Release date: September 17, 2026
- Running time: 12 minutes
- Country: United States

Optimus Prime: Awakening is a 2026 American animated science-fiction short film based on the animated television series The Transformers. It was directed by Josh Wassung and written by Ryan Parrott. The short stars Peter Cullen in his final performance as Optimus Prime, who is sent to an afterlife where he sees visions of conflict and is confronted by his past choices. It also stars Frank Welker reprising his voice role as Megatron.

Optimus Prime: Awakening premiered on September 17, 2026, attached to screenings of the 40th anniversary re-release of The Transformers: The Movie.

== Plot ==
Upon his death, (Note: As depicted in The Transformers: The Movie (1986).) Optimus Prime is sent to an afterlife where he is confronted by a supernatural entity known as "the One". Optimus pleads for the One to revive him so he may aid his Autobot allies and fulfill an oath to protect the Autobot Matrix of Leadership. The One explains that, throughout every timeline, (Note: Scenes from other Transformers series outside of Generation 1 includes Animated, Prime and the closing shot of the 2007 film.) Optimus will only continue to die fighting a war he is prolonging. The One shows Optimus a vision in which he is attacked by Decepticons, including his friend Bumblebee, who berates Optimus for leading the Autobots into a war they cannot win.

After being freed from the vision, Optimus begs to be sent back once more, insisting that he only fights to protect the innocent. The One shows him a vision of Unicron destroying Earth, telling him that if he continues on a path of conflict, more life will be killed. During the vision, Optimus's hand briefly turns into a human hand. The One explains to Optimus that he must give up his role as the Autobot leader and his ties with the Matrix to "break the cycle".

Optimus is sent to one final vision of war on Cybertron, the Transformers' home planet. He saves Bumblebee from Megatron, who tells Bumblebee that if Optimus intended to kill him, he would have already done so. Optimus overpowers Megatron but spares him despite Bumblebee's urging, and discards the Matrix of Leadership. Optimus leaves through a glowing doorway, telling Bumblebee that he will understand his choice someday, and that he must leave to "light [their] darkest hour". Afterwards, Megatron recovers the Matrix.

== Voice cast ==
- Peter Cullen as Optimus Prime, the Autobot leader who succumbed to his injuries after death
- Frank Welker as:
  - Megatron, the leader of the Decepticons
  - Soundwave, the Decepticons communications officer
- Simon Henderson as the One, an extradimensional entity who implores Optimus Prime to break a never-ending cycle involving the war
- Jarret LeMaster as Bumblebee, an Autobot scout
- Mathieu Bourassa as Starscream, the Air Commander of the Decepticon battle fleet
- Scott Law as Kickback, an Insecticon who transforms into a mechanical Grasshopper
- Gray Powell as Shrapnel, an Insecticon who transforms into a mechanical Stag beetle

Archive audio of Paul Eiding as Perceptor, Robert Stack as Ultra Magnus and Judd Nelson as Hot Rod from The Transformers: The Movie can be heard in the short's opening scene.

== Production ==
Optimus Prime and Megatron were made for each other. After all, one needs the perfect hero against the epitome of evil to create great drama. Peter's portrayal of Prime was born of his own personal beliefs; honesty, loyalty, and always insisting on doing the right thing. This made it easy to be friends. Returning as Megatron and Soundwave for one final story opposite Peter's Optimus in Optimus Prime: Awakening was a real gift. I will miss my friend, but that voice and his heart and values will always be part of Optimus Prime.

— Frank Welker's words on Peter Cullen for his involvement in Awakening

As part of the 40th anniversary "apology tour" of The Transformers: The Movie, Fathom Events announced that they would re-release the film from September 17–21, 2026. In a trailer for the re-release, it was teased that screenings would include a new post-credits short film. The full details were revealed in early September 2026, including the announcement of original The Movie actors Peter Cullen and Frank Welker reprising their respective roles as Optimus Prime and both Megatron and Soundwave. Awakening features the final performance of Cullen, who died a month before its release on August 26, and is dedicated to his memory.

Shortly after Awakening's release, Jarret LeMaster revealed he got the role of Bumblebee because he is friends with the director, Josh Wassung. LeMaster initially regarded the project as just "this little Transformers movie", but grew more eager when he found out Cullen was involved, and later praised the actor for embodying "strength and gentleness and kindness" and "protecting the weak". However, Dan Gilvezan, the original voice actor for Bumblebee, expressed his disdain on social media for not being involved in the short.

== Release ==
Optimus Prime: Awakening premiered on September 17, 2026, at the Landmark Sunset Theatre, attached to screenings of the Hasbro 40th anniversary re-release of The Transformers: The Movie, followed by a Q&A with Steve Weintraub and director Wassung. The short will be included as a bonus feature on the 40th anniversary 4K Ultra HD steelbook of The Transformers: The Movie released by Shout! Factory.
