= Al Boliska =

Canadian radio and television personality

Al Boliska (April 8, 1932 - April 7, 1972) was a Canadian radio and television personality, most noted for his stint as the morning host on CHUM in Toronto from 1957 to 1963.

A native of Montreal, Quebec, he began his radio career working for CBM, the CBC Radio station in Montreal, before joining CKLC in Kingston, Ontario. He joined CHUM in 1957 when the station shifted from its original full service format to become the city's first Top 40 radio station, and thus served as the most influential morning host in Canada during the dawn of rock 'n roll. With CHUM, he was also known for introducing elements of comedy that were unconventional on radio at the time, including stunts, character comedy sketches and a daily "World's Worst Joke" feature that would become widely syndicated to radio stations throughout North America, and spawned several spinoff books and a compilation album over the course of his career.

With a band called The Rhythm Pals, consisting of musicians Mike Ferbey, Marc Wald and Jack Jensen, he recorded the novelty country single "The Ballad of the Dying Cowboy", which was a modest local hit in the Toronto area in 1960.

In the 1960s he also hosted a travel show, On the Scene, for CBC Toronto, and wrote for the Toronto Telegram and the Toronto Star.

In 1963 he left CHUM to join rival station CKEY. When that station dropped its Top 40 programming in 1965 for a middle of the road format, he left to join the new CHIN as both morning man and station manager, but left six months after the station's launch to return to Montreal and join CFCF in 1967, where he was also a contributor to sister television station CFCF-TV.

In 1970, he was the first host of the syndicated television game show Party Game, although he was replaced by Bill Walker after the show's first season. In the same era, he was a cast member in the CBC Television sketch comedy series Zut!, a writer for Let's Call the Whole Thing Orff, and a contributor of comedic commentary segments to Elwood Glover's Luncheon Date.

He died on April 7, 1972, the night before his 40th birthday. Although he was known to have been unhappy about turning 40, his cause of death was determined as asphyxiation caused by an acute lung obstruction rather than suicide.
