= Ōno Kōjin =

Toy designer

Kojin Ono (Japanese: 大野 光仁, Hepburn: Ōno Kōjin; born May 11, 1959, Tokyo) is a Japanese toy designer employed by Takara since 1980. Ōno's early designs included the Diaclone Walk-In Centre and Microman Acro Saturn. He designed most of the Diaclone Car Robot line (with additional design work by Shoji Kawamori) and Car Microman figures, which drew the attention of the U.S. toy company Hasbro. Hasbro amalgamated the Diaclone and Microman figures and, along with a story treatment developed by Marvel, created the toy cult phenomenon known as the Transformers. Ōno continued to design Transformers throughout the 1980s until the end of the original series.

Ōno designed most Transformers manufactured by Takara, including Metroplex, Fortress Maximus, and Powermaster Optimus Prime. Among the hundreds of Transformers that he designed, he considers the Decepticon Triple Changers Blitzwing and Astrotrain to be his finest achievements in toy design.

Although Ōno no longer designs Transformer toys, as of 2005, he is still employed by Takara, where he continues to design figures in other Takara toylines.
