= Comedy Cafe =

1969 Canadian television series

- Genre: Comedy
- Written by: John Morgan; Martin Bronstein
- Starring: Barrie Baldaro; Dave Broadfoot; George Carron; Joan Stuart; Ted Zeigler; Peter Cullen
- Country of origin: Canada
- Original language: English
- No. of seasons: 1

Production
- Producer: Dale Barnes
- Production location: Montreal
- Running time: variable

Original release
- Network: CBC Television
- Release: 1 February – 8 March 1969

Related
- Comedy Crackers

Comedy Cafe is a Canadian comedy television series that aired on CBC Television in 1969.

== Premise ==
This Montreal-produced series featured performers from CBC Radio's Funny You Should Say That series, namely Barrie Baldaro, Joan Stuart and Ted Zeigler. They were joined by additional performers Dave Broadfoot and George Carron. The series borrowed from material already broadcast on the radio series such as "The Tavern" in which men have a conversation at a bar, or "L'Anglaises" about a French-speaking husband (Carron) and his English-speaking wife (Stuart). The series also featured Broadfoot's frequently-performed Member for Kicking Horse Pass character.

Comedy Cafe already aired as a local series in Montreal since late 1968. It was brought to the national network to fill in the time slot left vacant by the demise of Barris and Company. The series also transitioned to colour broadcasts due to its national exposure.

Episodes were recorded at Montreal's Windsor Hotel in the Versailles Room.

== Scheduling ==
This half-hour series was broadcast Saturdays at approximately 10:15 p.m. (Eastern) from 1 February to 8 March 1969, following the conclusion of the Hockey Night in Canada broadcast.
