= Comedy Crackers =

- Genre: Comedy
- Starring: Barrie Baldaro; Dave Broadfoot; George Carron; Joan Stuart; Ted Zeigler
- Narrated by: Alec Bollini; Stanley Gibbons
- Country of origin: Canada
- Original language: English
- No. of seasons: 1

Production
- Producer: Dale Barnes
- Production location: Montreal
- Running time: 30 minutes

Original release
- Network: CBC Television
- Release: 4 February – 16 September 1970

Related
- Comedy Cafe

Comedy Crackers is a Canadian comedy television series that aired on CBC Television in 1970.

== Premise ==
This series was a follow-up to 1969's Comedy Cafe which was a local series that was brought to the national CBC network to fill in for the early cancellation Barris and Company. This new series followed a similar format as Comedy Cafe with its sketches whose themes often reflected the Canadian cultural divide between English and French. The same cast also returned, namely Barrie Baldaro, Dave Broadfoot, George Carron, Joan Stuart and Ted Zeigler. They were joined by the Harry Marks Orchestra and announcers Alec Bollini and Stanley Gibbons. Recurring sketches included "B & B Pub" with Baldaro and Carron as tavern owners, and "L'Anglaises" which was continued from Comedy Cafe with Carron and Stuart reprising their routine as a mixed-language couple.

== Production ==
Comedy Crackers, like Comedy Cafe, was recorded at Montreal's Windsor Hotel in the Versailles Room.

== Scheduling ==
This half-hour series was broadcast Wednesdays at 10:30 p.m. (Eastern) from 4 February to 16 September 1970.
