= Just Ask, Inc. =

- Genre: Children's educational television
- Presented by: David Suzuki
- Composer: Bill Ivenuik
- Country of origin: Canada
- Original language: English
- No. of seasons: 2

Production
- Producer: Denise Duncan
- Running time: 30 minutes

Original release
- Network: CBC Television
- Release: 4 February – 28 December 1981

Just Ask, Inc. is a Canadian children's educational television program that aired on CBC Television in 1981.

== Premise ==
David Suzuki hosted this science series geared towards children between ages eight and twelve. Topics included anatomy, astronomy, nature, snoring and the twinkling of stars. Neil McInnes provided animated segments.

== Scheduling ==
This half-hour series was broadcast Wednesdays at 4:00 p.m. (Eastern) from 4 February to 25 March 1981, then another series run Mondays at 4:00 p.m. from 19 October to 28 December 1981. His co-host was a robot, Lustra (Joan Stuart voice) in the first season and Ami (Luba Goy voice) in the second series run.
