= Zut! =

Canadian sketch comedy television series

Zut! is a Canadian sketch comedy television series that aired Saturday evenings from 1970 to 1971 on CBC Television. It was based loosely on relations between Quebec and the rest of Canada.

The cast included Peter Cullen, Barrie Baldaro, Joan Stuart, Ted Zeigler, Dave Broadfoot, Wally Martin, Al Boliska, Dave Harriman, as well as singer Donald Lautrec and an orchestra conducted by François Cousineau. The series was produced in Montreal by Dale Barnes.
