= Microman =

Multimedia franchise based on a toyline

- A scan of the cover of a Microman catalog from 1976
- Type: Action figure
- Invented by: Takara
- Company: Takara / Tomy
- Country: Japan
- Availability: 1974–2007
- Materials: Plastic/die-cast

Microman (ミクロマン, Mikuroman) was a science fiction toyline created, manufactured and marketed by Takara from 1974 to 1984 as well as from 1998 to 2007. The Microman line was a series of 3.75-inch-tall (9.5 cm) action figures with accompanying vehicles, robots, playsets and accessories. Unlike other toylines at the time, Microman figures were marketed as being the "actual" size of cyborg beings called "Micros" that hailed from a fictional planet known as "Micro Earth" and disguised themselves as action figures while on planet Earth.

== Description ==
A photo of a vintage Microman M101 (George) 3.75-inch-tall (9.5 cm) action figure with capsule in the background.

The core of the Microman line consisted of 3.75-inch-tall (9.5 cm) action figures which were known for their high number of articulation points relative to other toys of similar size/scale in the 1970s. The toyline also included vehicles, robots, playsets and accessories. Many of the Microman toys used interchangeable 5-millimetre (0.20 in) connectors and ports that allowed parts to be transferred and connected between different toys.

The Microman toyline was licensed and released in the United States by Mego Corporation as the Micronauts from 1976 to 1980.

Some of the transforming Microman toys and vehicles from the Micro Change series created within the 1980s New Microman toyline were licensed by Hasbro, along with other similar transforming toys from Takara's Diaclone toyline, in the 1980s to be a part of Hasbro's Transformers toyline in the United States.

== History ==
=== Classic Microman (1974–1980) ===
Takara first released Microman toys in Japan in 1974 as a smaller version of their popular 8-inch-tall (20 cm) & 12-inch-tall (30 cm) 1972 Henshin Cyborg (Transforming Cyborg) line. Henshin Cyborg figures were based on 8-inch-tall (20 cm) & 12-inch-tall (30 cm) Combat Joe figures — which themselves were based on Hasbro's G.I. Joe figures — with their bodies molded in clear plastic, exposing their inner workings and supposed cybernetic parts.

By downscaling their size, Takara sought to create the Microman line to offset the sheer cost of producing a full line of plastic-based 8-inch-tall (20 cm) & 12-inch-tall (30 cm) figures and related playsets as well as acknowledging that basic living space is limited—and considered a premium—to most Japanese households. Smaller Microman figures would not only cost less to produce during the energy crisis of the 1970s, but also the line's smaller scale would take up less physical space in a household and thus be more attractive to space conscious consumers in the Japanese market.

==== Microman Zone (1974) ====
The first 1974 series of toys was called Microman Zone and included four figures and several vehicles such as the MIC-1 Space Buggy, MIC-2 Bulk Lifter, MIC-3 Sky Roader and the M115 Conning Tower Base. Additional vehicles were sold as "Micro-Kit Machine Series" sets which required assembly prior to use.

==== Project Victory (1975) ====
Following the success of the first 1974 Microman Zone series, Takara completely revamped and expanded the Microman concept to be a stand-alone line on its own and not merely a smaller-scale version of their Henshin Cyborg line. The former original Microman figures were now given sturdier "cybernetic feet" and all figures now contained standard 5-millimetre (0.20 in) ports which allowed for interchangeability between sets and figures. Takara also introduced a new line of die-cast figures dubbed Super Steel Microman and a new line of "enemy" figures dubbed the Acroyears. Additionally, all figures were now identified by a new alphanumeric figure-type designation system—such as M10X, M11X, M12X, M20X, M21X, M22X, etc.—across the whole line as well being given formal, character names such as George (M101), Jack (M102), Jesse (M103) and John (M104).

==== Spy Magician (1976) ====
In addition to new vehicles and figures such as Spy Magician (M13X & M14X), Takara introduced a new class of figure dubbed the Titans which employed a magnetic ball/joint system that allowed for a new level of interchangeability between toys. Japanese pop-culture character tie-in toys were also released (such as Microman Jeeg, Robotman Gakeen and Robotman Mechadon) which helped expand Takara's line beyond its own in-house characters and opened the door to greater licensing opportunities for their designs.

==== Microman Command (1977) ====
A Microman manga was published in TV Magazine, a children's oriented magazine published by Kodansha, in 1977. Takara also introduced the Microman Command line in which each figure came in its own unique capsule case (shaped like Easter Island figures, the Statue of Liberty, etc.) and included the first female figure, Lady Command (M18X), in the line.

==== Police Keeper (1978) ====
With the release of Star Wars in 1977, the market for science fiction merchandise became increasingly filled with competing science fiction related products. New figures such as the Police Keeper (M23X), Micro Knight MC-X and Cosmo Satan Arden (A35X) built on the success of prior Microman action figure releases. Takara's attempts to expand the Microman line concept with the Micro Hoodman (H70X) and construction/building playset Play Build line of toys with the large-sized Build Base playset were not well received. Lack of a positive response to the new line was strong enough that previously announced toys in the line, such as the remote control Hoodman spaceship Hoodman's RCB Noah, were cancelled.

==== Rescue Command (1979) ====
Takara attempted to revive the line with the new Rescue Command series of toys and action figures. At the core of the Rescue Command was the new Rescue Secret Base and a new background story that explained the whole "rescue" theme of the whole line.

==== Punch & Blizzard Man (1980) ====
In 1980, Takara moved away from releasing 3.75-inch-tall (9.5 cm) figures and instead concentrated on larger-sized toys, robots and sets that all contained some sort of "gimmick" to them. Gimmicks included the Microman Punch (P.0X) figure whose arm could be wound up to "punch" and Microman Blizzard (B-X) series of figures that contained a battery-powered fan.

==== Microman 3.75-inch-tall (9.5 cm) action figures (1974–1980) ====
Below is a basic overview list documenting classic Microman 3.75-inch-tall (9.5 cm) action figure releases from 1974 to 1980. This is not meant to be a comprehensive list of all classic Microman releases/variants but rather a high-level overview of Takara's 3.75-inch-tall (9.5 cm) Microman line offerings.

Classic Microman 3.75-inch-tall (9.5 cm) action figures (1974–1980)
ID	Name	Type	1st color	2nd color	Opacity	Material	Size/Scale	Date	Series
			Clear		Clear	Plastic	3.75-inch (9.5 cm)	June 1974	Microman Zone
			Yellow		Clear	Plastic	3.75-inch (9.5 cm)	June 1974	Microman Zone
			Blue		Clear	Plastic	3.75-inch (9.5 cm)	June 1974	Microman Zone
			Orange		Clear	Plastic	3.75-inch (9.5 cm)	June 1974	Microman Zone
M101	George		Clear		Clear	Plastic	3.75-inch (9.5 cm)	October 1974	Project Victory
M102	Jack		Yellow		Clear	Plastic	3.75-inch (9.5 cm)	October 1974	Project Victory
M103	Jesse		Blue		Clear	Plastic	3.75-inch (9.5 cm)	October 1974	Project Victory
M104	John		Orange		Clear	Plastic	3.75-inch (9.5 cm)	October 1974	Project Victory
M111	Bobson		Blue	White	Solid	Plastic	3.75-inch (9.5 cm)	March 1975	Project Victory
M112	Barnes		White	Light Blue	Solid	Plastic	3.75-inch (9.5 cm)	March 1975	Project Victory
M113	Bobby		Red	White	Solid	Plastic	3.75-inch (9.5 cm)	March 1975	Project Victory
M114	Blacky		Black	Yellow	Solid	Plastic	3.75-inch (9.5 cm)	March 1975	Project Victory
M121	Mason		Red	White	Solid	Plastic	3.75-inch (9.5 cm)	March 1975	Project Victory
M122	Michael		Light Blue	White	Solid	Plastic	3.75-inch (9.5 cm)	March 1975	Project Victory
M123	Miller		Green	White	Clear	Plastic	3.75-inch (9.5 cm)	March 1975	Project Victory
M124	Max		Yellow	White	Solid	Plastic	3.75-inch (9.5 cm)	March 1975	Project Victory
M201	Robin	Super Steel Microman	Red	Chrome	Solid	Die cast	3.75-inch (9.5 cm)	March 1975	Project Victory
M202	Robert	Super Steel Microman	Green	Chrome	Solid	Die cast	3.75-inch (9.5 cm)	March 1975	Project Victory
M203	Rocky	Super Steel Microman	Blue	Chrome	Solid	Die cast	3.75-inch (9.5 cm)	March 1975	Project Victory
M211	Ken	Super Steel: Dash Wing Type	Yellow	Chrome	Solid	Die cast	3.75-inch (9.5 cm)	August 1975	Project Victory
M212	Kelly	Super Steel: Dash Wing Type	Green	Chrome	Solid	Die cast	3.75-inch (9.5 cm)	August 1975	Project Victory
M213	Kim	Super Steel: Dash Wing Type	Blue	Chrome	Solid	Die cast	3.75-inch (9.5 cm)	August 1975	Project Victory
M221	Robin	Super Steel: Hand Bazooka Type	Red	Chrome	Solid	Die cast	3.75-inch (9.5 cm)	September 1975	Project Victory
M222	Robert	Super Steel: Hand Bazooka Type	Green	Chrome	Solid	Die cast	3.75-inch (9.5 cm)	September 1975	Project Victory
M223	Rocky	Super Steel: Hand Bazooka Type	Blue	Chrome	Solid	Die cast	3.75-inch (9.5 cm)	September 1975	Project Victory
A301	Red Star	Acroyear	Red	Black	Solid	Die cast/Plastic	3.75-inch (9.5 cm)	April 1975	Project Victory
A302	Silver Star	Acroyear	Silver	Black	Solid	Die cast/Plastic	3.75-inch (9.5 cm)	April 1975	Project Victory
A303	Blue Star	Acroyear	Blue	Black	Solid	Die cast/Plastic	3.75-inch (9.5 cm)	April 1975	Project Victory
A311	Mad Pink	Acroyear 2	Red	Black	Solid	Die cast/Plastic	3.75-inch (9.5 cm)	November 1975	Project Victory
A312	Mad Green	Acroyear 2	Green	Black	Solid	Die cast/Plastic	3.75-inch (9.5 cm)	November 1975	Project Victory
A313	Mad Blue	Acroyear 2	Blue	Black	Solid	Die cast/Plastic	3.75-inch (9.5 cm)	November 1975	Project Victory
M131	Dick		Blue	Black	Solid	Plastic	3.75-inch (9.5 cm)	June 1976	Spy Magician
M132	Dan		Red	White	Solid	Plastic	3.75-inch (9.5 cm)	June 1976	Spy Magician
M133	Danny		Black	Red	Solid	Plastic	3.75-inch (9.5 cm)	June 1976	Spy Magician
M134	David		Green	White	Solid	Plastic	3.75-inch (9.5 cm)	June 1976	Spy Magician
M141	Henry		White	Blue	Solid	Plastic	3.75-inch (9.5 cm)	June 1976	Spy Magician
M142	Hudson		Green	Black	Solid	Plastic	3.75-inch (9.5 cm)	June 1976	Spy Magician
M143	Holmes		Yellow	Blue	Solid	Plastic	3.75-inch (9.5 cm)	June 1976	Spy Magician
M144	Howard		Black	Yellow	Solid	Plastic	3.75-inch (9.5 cm)	June 1976	Spy Magician
A321	Devil	President Acroyear	Blue	Light Blue	Solid	Plastic	3.75-inch (9.5 cm)	October 1976	Spy Magician
A322	Satander	President Acroyear	Green	Light Green	Solid	Plastic	3.75-inch (9.5 cm)	October 1976	Spy Magician
A323	Demon	President Acroyear	Red	Blue	Solid	Plastic	3.75-inch (9.5 cm)	October 1976	Spy Magician
M151	East	Command 1	Light Blue	Black	Solid	Plastic	3.75-inch (9.5 cm)	April 1977	Microman Command
M152	Eric	Command 1	Red	White	Solid	Plastic	3.75-inch (9.5 cm)	April 1977	Microman Command
M153	Elder	Command 1	Light Blue	White	Clear	Plastic	3.75-inch (9.5 cm)	April 1977	Microman Command
M154	Evan	Command 1	Black	Yellow	Solid	Plastic	3.75-inch (9.5 cm)	April 1977	Microman Command
M161	Sheriff	Command 2	Blue	White	Solid	Plastic	3.75-inch (9.5 cm)	May 1977	Microman Command
M162	Sander	Command 2	Orange	Black	Solid	Plastic	3.75-inch (9.5 cm)	May 1977	Microman Command
M163	Sander	Command 2	Green	Yellow	Clear	Plastic	3.75-inch (9.5 cm)	May 1977	Microman Command
M164	Sammy	Command 2	Grey	Black	Solid	Plastic	3.75-inch (9.5 cm)	May 1977	Microman Command
M171	Takuma	Command 3	Red	Black	Solid	Plastic	3.75-inch (9.5 cm)	December 1977	Microman Command
M172	Tetsuya	Command 3	Dark Grey	Dark Grey	Solid	Plastic	3.75-inch (9.5 cm)	December 1977	Microman Command
M173	Tatsuya	Command 3	White	Blue	Solid	Plastic	3.75-inch (9.5 cm)	December 1977	Microman Command
M174	Tsuyoshi	Command 3	Blue	Yellow	Solid	Plastic	3.75-inch (9.5 cm)	December 1977	Microman Command
M181	Ann	Lady Command	Red	White	Solid	Plastic	3.75-inch (9.5 cm)	December 1977	Microman Command
M182	Alice	Lady Command	Blue	Red	Solid	Plastic	3.75-inch (9.5 cm)	December 1977	Microman Command
M183	Annie	Lady Command	Green	Orange	Solid	Plastic	3.75-inch (9.5 cm)	December 1977	Microman Command
M184	Ai	Lady Command	Pink	Black	Solid	Plastic	3.75-inch (9.5 cm)	December 1977	Microman Command
M231	Arnold		Red	White	Solid	Plastic	3.75-inch (9.5 cm)	October 1978	Police Keeper
M232	Arthur		Blue	White	Solid	Plastic	3.75-inch (9.5 cm)	October 1978	Police Keeper
M233	Alex		Green	Yellow	Clear	Plastic	3.75-inch (9.5 cm)	October 1978	Police Keeper
M234	Anthony		Black	Yellow	Solid	Plastic	3.75-inch (9.5 cm)	October 1978	Police Keeper
M235	Aaron		Orange	White	Clear	Plastic	3.75-inch (9.5 cm)	October 1978	Police Keeper
M236	Alan		White	Light Blue	Solid	Plastic	3.75-inch (9.5 cm)	October 1978	Police Keeper
A351	Heller	Cosmo Satan Arden	Red	Black	Solid	Die cast/Plastic	3.75-inch (9.5 cm)	May 1978	Police Keeper
A352	Rager	Cosmo Satan Arden	Silver	Black	Solid	Die cast/Plastic	3.75-inch (9.5 cm)	May 1978	Police Keeper
A353	Vulger	Cosmo Satan Arden	Blue	Black	Solid	Die cast/Plastic	3.75-inch (9.5 cm)	May 1978	Police Keeper
MC8		Micro Knight	Silver		Solid	Plastic	3.75-inch (9.5 cm)	February 1979	Police Keeper
MC9		Micro Knight	Gold		Solid	Plastic	3.75-inch (9.5 cm)	February 1979	Police Keeper
MC10		Micro Knight	Black		Solid	Plastic	3.75-inch (9.5 cm)	February 1979	Police Keeper
MC11		Micro Knight	Blue		Solid	Plastic	3.75-inch (9.5 cm)	July 1979	Police Keeper
MC12		Micro Knight	Copper		Solid	Plastic	3.75-inch (9.5 cm)	July 1979	Police Keeper
MC13		Micro Knight	Green		Solid	Plastic	3.75-inch (9.5 cm)	July 1979	Police Keeper
H701	Hans	Micro Hoodman	Blue	White	Solid	Plastic	3.15-inch (8.0 cm)	March 1978	Police Keeper
H702	Regan	Micro Hoodman	Yellow	Black	Solid	Plastic	3.15-inch (8.0 cm)	March 1978	Police Keeper
H703	Heimlich	Micro Hoodman	Green	White	Solid	Plastic	3.15-inch (8.0 cm)	March 1978	Police Keeper
H711	Shultz	Micro Hoodman	Red	White	Solid	Plastic	3.15-inch (8.0 cm)	March 1978	Police Keeper
H712	Rudolf	Micro Hoodman	White	Blue	Solid	Plastic	3.15-inch (8.0 cm)	March 1978	Police Keeper
H713	Earhart	Micro Hoodman	Blue	Black	Solid	Plastic	3.15-inch (8.0 cm)	March 1978	Police Keeper
H721	Heilman	Micro Hoodman	Gold	White	Solid	Plastic	3.15-inch (8.0 cm)	February 1979	Police Keeper
H722	Lihaout	Micro Hoodman	Silver	Black	Solid	Plastic	3.15-inch (8.0 cm)	February 1979	Police Keeper
H723	Cardel	Micro Hoodman	Blue	Red	Solid	Plastic	3.15-inch (8.0 cm)	February 1979	Police Keeper
M251	Robin		Orange	Black	Solid	Plastic	3.75-inch (9.5 cm)	February 1979	Rescue Command
M252	William		Blue	White	Solid	Plastic	3.75-inch (9.5 cm)	February 1979	Rescue Command
M253	Richard		Light Blue	White	Solid	Plastic	3.75-inch (9.5 cm)	February 1979	Rescue Command
M261	Chris		Red	White	Solid	Plastic	3.75-inch (9.5 cm)	February 1979	Rescue Command
M262	Adam		Yellow	Black	Solid	Plastic	3.75-inch (9.5 cm)	February 1979	Rescue Command
M263	James		Light Green	White	Solid	Plastic	3.75-inch (9.5 cm)	February 1979	Rescue Command
M271	Lake		Blue	White	Solid	Plastic	3.75-inch (9.5 cm)	October 1979	Rescue Command
M272	Leon		Green	White	Solid	Plastic	3.75-inch (9.5 cm)	October 1979	Rescue Command
M273	Leonard		Orange	Black	Solid	Plastic	3.75-inch (9.5 cm)	October 1979	Rescue Command
M274	Carlton		Yellow	Black	Solid	Plastic	3.75-inch (9.5 cm)	October 1979	Rescue Command
M275	Richard		Green	Black	Solid	Plastic	3.75-inch (9.5 cm)	October 1979	Rescue Command
M281	Clark		Red	White	Solid	Plastic	3.75-inch (9.5 cm)	October 1979	Rescue Command
M282	Ryan		Yellow	Black	Solid	Plastic	3.75-inch (9.5 cm)	October 1979	Rescue Command
M283	Clark		Blue	White	Solid	Plastic	3.75-inch (9.5 cm)	October 1979	Rescue Command
M284	Foster		Red	Black	Solid	Plastic	3.75-inch (9.5 cm)	October 1979	Rescue Command
A371	Blue Amazon Commander	Acroyear Amazon	Blue	Black	Solid	Plastic	3.75-inch (9.5 cm)	April 1979	Rescue Command
A372	Red Amazon Commander	Acroyear Amazon	Red	Black	Solid	Plastic	3.75-inch (9.5 cm)	April 1979	Rescue Command
A373	Green Amazon Commander	Acroyear Amazon	Green	Black	Solid	Plastic	3.75-inch (9.5 cm)	April 1979	Rescue Command
A381	Fire Star	New Acroyear 1	Red	Black	Solid	Plastic	3.75-inch (9.5 cm)	August 1979	Rescue Command
A382	Earth Star	New Acroyear 1	Yellow	Black	Solid	Plastic	3.75-inch (9.5 cm)	August 1979	Rescue Command
A383	Sky Star	New Acroyear 1	Blue	Black	Solid	Plastic	3.75-inch (9.5 cm)	August 1979	Rescue Command

=== New Microman (1981–1984) ===
==== New Microman (1981) ====
While a line of new Microman 3.75-inch-tall (9.5 cm) figures were released for the 1980 New Microman line, their history was completely different from the figures that preceded them in the previous Microman line. The new line consisted of 10 Microman figures that came in molded capsules. There was now a greater focus on the Micro Robot series of toys as well as larger robot-oriented playsets.

==== Micro Robot (1982) ====
Takara's focus of the 1982 line was on the new Micro Borg and Micro Robot toys. While the Micro Robot W Box Set came with a New Microman M004 Eiji (Blue) figure, these figures were only available in the box set and not as individual figures.

==== Micro Change (1983) ====
In 1983, Takara introduced a new Microman toyline called Micro Change. The toys were seemingly ordinary items, such as cassette tapes, a microscope, watches and even guns, that could change into other forms to help Microman in their fight against the Acroyears. While the focus of the line had shifted away from the original Microman action figures, Takara released one last figure, dubbed Salam (M011).

==== Micro Change to Transformers (1984) ====
1984 saw the end of the Micro Change/Microman line with no new figures released that year. After seeing the success Hasbro had combining Takara's Diaclone and Micro Change lines into the Transformers toyline in the U.S. market, Takara decided to end both the Diaclone and Micro Change toylines and instead focus their efforts on releasing their own Japanese versions of the Transformers.

==== New Microman 3.75-inch-tall (9.5 cm) action figures (1981–1984) ====
Below is a basic overview list documenting New Microman 3.75-inch-tall (9.5 cm) action figure releases from 1981 to 1984. This is not meant to be a comprehensive list of all New Microman action figure releases/variants but rather a high-level overview of Takara's 3.75-inch-tall (9.5 cm) New Microman line offerings.

New Microman 3.75-inch-tall (9.5 cm) action figures (1981–1984)
ID	Name	Type	1st color	2nd color	Opacity	Material	Size/Scale	Body type	Date
M001	Arom		Green		Clear	Plastic	3.75-inch (9.5 cm)	M10X	1981
M002	Iriya		Red	Black	Solid	Plastic	3.75-inch (9.5 cm)	M11X	1981
M003	Uri		Black	Yellow	Solid	Plastic	3.75-inch (9.5 cm)	M12X	1981
M004	Eiji		Blue	Black	Solid	Plastic	3.75-inch (9.5 cm)	M15X	1981
M005	Oruga		Red	White	Solid	Plastic	3.75-inch (9.5 cm)	M17X	1981
M006	Kamui		Yellow	Black	Solid	Plastic	3.75-inch (9.5 cm)	M23X	1981
M007	Kirk		White	Blue	Solid	Plastic	3.75-inch (9.5 cm)	M25X	1981
M008	Cleo		Orange	Black	Solid	Plastic	3.75-inch (9.5 cm)	M26X	1981
M009	Kenji		Green	Black	Solid	Plastic	3.75-inch (9.5 cm)	M27X	1981
M010	Corona		Blue	Black	Solid	Plastic	3.75-inch (9.5 cm)	M28X	1981
M011	Saram		Black	Orange	Solid	Plastic	3.75-inch (9.5 cm)	M16X	1983
M011	Saram		Blue	White	Solid	Plastic	3.75-inch (9.5 cm)	M16X	1983
M011	Saram		Light Blue	Black	Solid	Plastic	3.75-inch (9.5 cm)	M16X	1983
M011	Saram		Red	Black	Solid	Plastic	3.75-inch (9.5 cm)	M16X	1983

=== Microman 21 Series (1996–1997) ===
From 1996 to 1997, a small Japanese hobby toy company named Romando acquired a provisional license from Takara to reissue vintage Microman figures. This series was known as the Microman 21 series since the release of these reissues coincided with the 21st anniversary of the original Microman series. Action figures reissued as a part of the Microman 21 series were figures in the Microman Command (M15x), Microman Command (M16x), Microman Rescue (M25x), Micro Knight MC-X, Spy Magician (M13X) lines of figures.

=== Micro Millennium Series (1998–2003) ===
In 1998, Takara produced a whole new line of Microman toys and reissued older Microman figures. The new Microman series was divided into two distinct lines: the Magne Powers and LED Powers series and the Replica Microman series based on the success of Romando's previous reissues under their brand name.

==== Replica Microman (1998–2003) ====
The Replica Microman series was mainly aimed at adult collectors and older fans of the original toyline. This series launched in 1998 with the Microman Founder (M10X) series which reissued the Microman (M10X) figures. That release was soon followed by the reissue of many other classic Microman figures such as Acroyear (A30X), Spy Magician (M14X), Lady Command (M18X) and others. In addition to reissuing versions that adhered to the original, vintage Microman color combinations, Takara also released several newly created, limited edition color variants with new character names and designations to add to the canon of the old series.

As the series progressed in the 2000s Takara continued to release more Replica Microman reissues as well as even more limited edition and exclusive color variants. While increasing variety of available product, this resulted in the Microman market becoming saturated with so many unsold, variants that by 2001 Takara decided to significantly scale back the release of the Replica Microman. By 2003 the Replica Microman series continued to put out releases but only on a very limited basis and mainly through Takara's e-Hobby Shop.

==== Magne Powers & LED Powers (1998–2000) ====
A photo of a Magne Power Microman 001 (Arthur) action figure

In December 1998, Takara officially launched the Magne Powers series which was followed in 2000 by the companion LED Powers series. The Magne Powers series and LED Powers series were designed for children with brand new toy designs and a new storyline which included a Microman anime series. In addition to the anime, Takara also commissioned manga serial for Comic BomBom magazine.

By 2000, Takara, which was dealing with financial issues, reduced their new LED Powers series to a few dozen of toys and canceled the Microman anime series as well as the manga in Comic BomBom magazine. Soon afterwards, Takara would put all of their new Microman properties on indefinite hiatus.

=== Microman Force Series (2003–2007) ===
In 2003, Takara decided to test Microman market again with a brand new series of action figures called Microman 2003 which was aimed towards collectors and older fans.

In the late 2000s, Takara expanded the overall Microman brand and Microman 2003 line to include various licensed brands, including Batman (both comic based and from Batman Begins), Superman (both comic based and from Superman Returns), Evangelion, Street Fighter, Godzilla, Alien vs. Predator and Kinnikuman. A Spider-Man toy was announced at one point and a photograph of a prototype does exist, but the figure was never produced and its product number was assigned to a Predator figure.

== Influence outside Japan ==
=== Micronauts (1976–1980) ===
In the late 1970s, the U.S. toy company Mego acquired the license for some of Takara's Microman 3.75-inch-tall (9.5 cm) toys and released them in the United States as the Micronauts. Mego manufactured and marketed Micronaut toys from 1976 to 1980 prior to the company's bankruptcy and dissolution in 1982. After Mego's demise, other toy companies such as Palisades Toys and SOTA (State of the Art) Toys attempted to revive the toyline over the years.

=== Transformers (1984–present) ===
In 1981, Takara produced a new Microman line called New Microman. A few years later in 1983, Takara launched a new Microman series within the New Microman line dubbed Micro Change. The line featured toys that were seemingly ordinary items (such as cassette tapes, microscopes, watches and even guns) that could transform themselves and "change" into other forms to help Microman in their fight against the Acroyears.

In 1984, Hasbro acquired the license for the transforming object toys from Takara's Micro Change toyline as well as similar transforming Takara toys in the Diaclone toyline and the two were combined by Hasbro to create the Transformers toyline.

Below is a table showing which Transformers were based on which Micro Change toys and their variants:

Transformers to Microman/Micro Change connections
Transformers (Hasbro)		Microman/Micro Change (Takara)			
Name	Affiliation	ID	Name	Variant	Release date
Frenzy	Decepticon	MC-01	Micross	Blue	1983
Rumble	Decepticon	MC-01	Micross	Red	1983
Ravage	Decepticon	MC-02	Jaguar		1983
Laserbeak	Decepticon	MC-03	Condor		1983
Cliffjumper	Autobot	MC-04	Mini Car Robo	01 Porsche Turbo 924	1983
Bumper	Autobot	MC-04	Mini Car Robo	02 Familia 1500 XG	1983
Bumblebee	Autobot	MC-04	Mini Car Robo	03 Volkswagen Beetle	1983
Gears	Autobot	MC-04	Mini Car Robo	04 4WD	1983
Brawn	Autobot	MC-04	Mini Car Robo	05 Jeep	1983
Windcharger	Autobot	MC-04	Mini Car Robo	06 Transam	1983
Huffer	Autobot	MC-04	Mini Car Robo	07 Truck	1983
Reflector	Decepticon	MC-05	Camera Robo Microx		1983
Browning	Decepticon	MC-07	Gun Robo Browning M1910		1983
Soundwave	Decepticon	MC-10	Cassette Man		1983
Megatron	Decepticon	MC-13	Gun Robo Walther P-38 U.N.C.L.E.		1983
Eggbot (Beast Wars)	Decepticon (Predacon)	MC-14	Metal Man		1984
Dark Eggbot (Beast Wars)	Decepticon (Predacon)	MC-14	Metal Man		1984
Pulse (Binocular Transformer)	Decepticon	MC-19	Binocular Robo Scope Man		1984
Perceptor	Autobot	MC-20	Microscope Robo Micro Scope		1984
Blaster	Autobot	MC-21	Radi-Cassette Robo		1984

== Related anime and manga ==
=== Microman Kodansha TV Magazine manga (1978–79) ===
In 1977, TV Magazine—a children's oriented magazine published by Kodansha—began publishing an official, Takara approved serialized Microman manga drawn by manga artist Yoshihiro Moritou. This serialized manga was compiled into six volumes released from 1978 to 1979. Additionally, a set of 30 Menko cards featuring Moritou's manga versions of Microman characters and vehicles was released during that period as well.

=== Microman Secret File Volume 1 catalog and manga (1984) ===
By 1984, Takara was continuing the trend of focusing their New Microman line away from the core 3.75-inch-tall (9.5 cm) Microman action figures to robots and other items. Specifically, their new focus was on their line of transformable items in the Micro Change line. Technically Microman Secret File Volume 1 was not a traditional, stand-alone manga one could purchase on their own; it was a combination of catalog and manga that was packaged with a few of the new toys in the 1984 Micro Change toyline such as MC-19: Binocular Robo Scope Man. Its purpose was to establish the new direction of the Microman toyline and place the new Micro Change line in proper context within the larger Microman universe. The manga portion of the Microman Secret File Volume 1 contained artwork by Yoshihiro Moritou, the manga artist who created the original Kodansha TV Magazine manga in the 1970s.

Hasbro's new Transformers toyline and related storyline would supersede many of the concepts and ideas presented in Microman Secret File Volume 1.

=== Microman: The Small Giant Comic BomBom manga (1998–1999) ===
From October 1998 to December 1999, Comic BomBom serialized a new manga based on Takara's new 1998 Magne Powers & LED Powers Microman toylines drawn by manga artist Hisashi Matsumoto. This manga was subsequently compiled into stand-alone volumes and released by Kodansha. The plot focused on a school boy who receives a package that contains five small action figures that begin to move on their own and start to talk to him. They introduce themselves as Microman, hailing from the planet "Micro Earth" and were sent to Earth to help save the planet.

=== Microman: The Small Giant Studio Pierrot anime (1999) ===
A Microman anime adaption was created by Studio Pierrot, based on the toys and the manga created by Hisashi Matsumoto and serialized in Comic BomBom, and ran from January 4 to December 27, 1999 on TV Tokyo. The series was subsequently released on VHS and DVD by Pioneer LDC. A companion theatrical film based on the anime TV series was also released in 1999. A PlayStation game related to the series, Chou Jiryoku Senshi Microman: Generation 2000, developed by Barnhouse Effect and published by Takara, was released in Japan on December 16, 1999.

== Related video games ==
- Chiisana Kyojin Microman: a PlayStation game based on the franchise, developed by Wavedge and published by Takara, released in Japan on March 11, 1999.

== See also ==
- DreamMix TV World Fighters: a crossover fighting game featuring M121 Mason as a playable character (with other Microman characters available as alternate colors)
