= Barris and Company =

- Written by: Alex Barris; Garry Ferrier; Ken Gunton; Bill Lynn; Lorne Michaels; Hart Pomerantz; Aubrey Tadman
- Directed by: Patrick King
- Presented by: Alex Barris
- Announcer: Alex Trebek; Janet Baird (sidekick)
- Music by: Guido Basso
- Country of origin: Canada
- Original language: English
- No. of seasons: 1

Production
- Producers: Stan Jacobson; Bob Jarvis
- Running time: 30 minutes

Original release
- Network: CBC Television
- Release: 21 September 1968 – 25 January 1969

Barris and Company is a Canadian variety and talk television program that aired on CBC Television from 1968 to 1969.

== Premise ==
Host Alex Barris conducted this live variety broadcast following CBC's hockey games. Alex Trebek was Barris' partner, replaced later on the series run by Janet Baird.

== Production ==
The initial producer, Stan Jacobson, left the series for work in Hollywood during the show run and was replaced by Bob Jarvis. Initial writers Lorne Michaels and Hart Pomerantz also left mid-series for California. Guido Basso led the show's band.

== Scheduling ==
The half-hour series aired Saturdays at approximately 10:30 p.m. following Hockey Night in Canada from 21 September 1968 to 25 January 1969. The cancellation followed poor critical reviews, substantial turnover of writing and production staff and other complications such as pre-emptions due to the 1968 Summer Olympics broadcasts.
