= Ted Zeigler =

American actor and comedian (1926–1999)

- Zeigler as Johnny Jellybean in the 1960s
- Born: Theodore Lee Zeigler; June 3, 1926; Chicago, Illinois, U.S.
- Died: December 12, 1999 (aged 73); Los Angeles, California, U.S.
- Occupations: Actor; comedian

Theodore Lee Zeigler (June 3, 1926 – December 12, 1999) was an American actor, voice actor and comedian.

== Early life ==
Born in Chicago, Illinois, the last of 11 children, Zeigler was the son of a union organizer who was killed by the mafia in the 1930s. His sister Dodie was a Ziegfeld girl and busily worked on stage and on radio. He started working as a firefighter at 17, and during World War II, he served in the United States Navy, taking part in the Battle of Okinawa and in the Battle of Leyte Gulf, and surviving a kamikaze attack which had sunk his ship.

== Career ==
After the war Zeigler graduated in direction and production at the Goodman Theater School, where he became friend with classmate Harvey Korman, with whom in 1954 he formed a short-lived stand-up comedy duo known as Marsh and Field. Zeigler started working on television in the mid-1950s, playing Uncle Bucky for three seasons in the WGN-TV kids show Lunchtime Little Theater. He then worked in Australia, where he hosted the HSV talk show House Party, and in Canada, where between 1962 and 1967 he had large success with the CFCF kids show Jellybean Comedy Clubhouse (also known as Lunchtime Little Theater and The Johnny Jellybean Show), in which he played the titular character Johnny Jellybean as well as a number of other roles, making extensive use of improvisation. After the cancellation of the show he formed a comedy duo with Peter Cullen, working mainly on CBC, and in 1970 he decided to move back to the US, settling down in Los Angeles.

In the 1970s Zeigler became a regular on The Sonny & Cher Comedy Hour and in its follow-up The Sonny & Cher Show, and also appeared in The Andy Williams Show, The Carol Burnett Show, The Hudson Brothers Razzle Dazzle Show, The Shields and Yarnell Show, among others. A brain tumor and its treatment kept him out of work for several years, and in the mid-1980s he reprised his activity mainly working as a voice actor for animated series including Heathcliff, Galtar and the Golden Lance and Challenge of the GoBots, and serving as personal manager for a number of figures of the entertainment industry.
