= List of comics based on Hasbro properties =

List of comics based on Hasbro properties.

== Publications ==
=== Action Man ===
Title	Year	Publishers
Action Man	2003	Panini Comics
Action Man	2004	
Action Man: X Missions		
Action Man	2016	IDW Publishing
Action Man: Revolution	2016	IDW Publishing

=== Beetleborgs ===
Title	Year	Publishers
Saban's Beetleborgs	1997	Devere Publishing

=== Clue ===
Title	Year	Publishers
Clue	2017	IDW Publishing
Clue: Candlestick	2019	IDW Publishing

=== Dungeons & Dragons ===
Title	Year	Publishers
Advanced Dungeons & Dragons	1988–1991	DC Comics
Dragonlance	1988–1991	DC Comics
Dragonlance Chronicles Vol. 1	2005–2006	Devil's Due Publishing
Dragonlance Chronicles Vol. 2	2006–2007	Devil's Due Publishing
Dragonlance Chronicles Vol. 3	2007–2008	Devil's Due Publishing

==== IDW Publishing ====
- Dungeons & Dragons (2010–2012)
- Dungeons & Dragons: Neverwinter Tales — The Legend of Drizzt (2010–2012)
- Infestation 2: Dungeons & Dragons: Eberron (2011)
- Dungeons & Dragons: Forgotten Realms (2012)
- Dungeons & Dragons: Cutter (2013)
- Dungeons & Dragons: Legends of Baldur's Gate (2014–2015)
- Dungeons & Dragons: Shadows of the Vampire (2016)
- Dungeons & Dragons: Frost Giant's Fury (2017)
- Dungeons & Dragons: Evil At Baldur's Gate (2018)
- Dungeons & Dragons: Infernal Tides (2019–2020)
- Dungeons & Dragons: A Darkened Wish (2019–2020)
- Dungeons & Dragons: At the Spine of the World (2020–2021)
- Dungeons & Dragons: Mindbreaker (2021–2022)
- Dungeons & Dragons: Best of Minsc & Boo (2022)
- Dungeons & Dragons: Ravenloft — Orphan of Agony Isle (2022)
- Dungeons & Dragons Sampler (2023)
- Dungeons & Dragons: Honor Among Thieves — The Feast of the Moon (2023)
- Dungeons & Dragons: Saturday Morning Adventures (2023)
- Dungeons & Dragons: Fortune Finder (2023–2024)
- Dungeons & Dragons: Saturday Morning Adventures (2024)
- Dungeons & Dragons: Ravenloft — Caravan of Curses (2024)
- Dungeons & Dragons: The Thief of Many Things (2024)

==== Dark Horse Comics ====
- Dungeons & Dragons: The Fallbacks (2025)
- Dungeons & Dragons: Total Party Killers (2026)
- Dungeons & Dragons (2026)

=== G.I. Joe ===
==== Marvel Comics ====
- G.I. Joe: A Real American Hero (1982–1994)
- G.I. Joe: Yearbook (1985)
- G.I. Joe: Special Missions (1986)

==== Image Comics and Devil's Due Publishing ====
- G.I. Joe: A Real American Hero (2001–2005)
- G.I. Joe: Battle Files
- G.I. Joe: Frontline
- G.I. Joe: Master & Apprentice

==== IDW Publishing ====
- G.I. Joe (2008–2011)
- G.I. Joe: Origins (2009–2011)
- G.I. Joe: Cobra (2009)
- G.I. Joe: Cobra Special (2009–2010)
- G.I. Joe: Cobra II (2010–2011)
- G.I. Joe: Hearts & Minds (2010)
- G.I. Joe: A Real American Hero (2010–2022)
- G.I. Joe: Infestation (2011)
- G.I. Joe: Cobra Civil War (2011)
- G.I. Joe (2011–2013)
- G.I. Joe: Cobra (2011–2012)
- G.I. Joe: Snake Eyes (2011–2013)
- Infestation 2: G.I. Joe (2012)
- G.I. Joe (2013–2014)
- G.I. Joe: Special Missions (2013–2014)
- G.I. Joe: The Cobra Files (2013–2014)
- G.I. Joe (2014–2015)
- G.I. Joe: Snake Eyes — Agent of Cobra (2015)
- G.I. Joe: Revolution (2015)
- G.I. Joe (2016–2017)
- G.I. Joe: A Real American Hero — Deviations (2016)
- G.I. Joe: First Strike (2017)
- Scarlett’s Strike Force (2017–2018)
- G.I. Joe: A Real American Hero — Silent Option (2018–2019)
- G.I. Joe: Sierra Muerte (2019)
- G.I. Joe (2019–2020)
- G.I. Joe: A Real American Hero — Yearbook 2019 (2019)
- G.I. Joe: A Real American Hero — Complete Silence (2020)
- Snake Eyes: Deadgame (2020–2021)
- G.I. Joe: Castle Fall (2021)
- G.I. Joe: A Real American Hero — Yearbook 2021 (2021)
- G.I. Joe: A Real American Hero — Serpentor Uncoiled (2021)
- Snake Eyes: Deadgame — Declassified (2021)
- G.I. Joe: A Real American Hero — Saturday Morning Adventures (2022)
- G.I. Joe: A Real American Hero — Yo Joe! (2022)
- G.I. Joe: A Real American Hero — Cobraaaa! (2022)
- G.I. Joe: A Real American Hero — 40th Anniversary Special (2022)
- G.I. Joe: A Real American Hero — Best of Snake Eyes (2022)
- G.I. Joe: A Real American Hero — Rise Of Serpentor (2022)
- G.I. Joe: A Real American Hero — Best of Storm Shadow (2022)

==== Image Comics and Skybound Entertainment ====
Title	Year	Publisher	Note
G.I. Joe: A Real American Hero	2023–present	Image Comics and Skybound Entertainment	A Real American Hero continuity (Marvel/IDW)
G.I. Joe: A Real American Hero #1 Larry Hama Cut	2023	Image Comics and Skybound Entertainment	A Real American Hero continuity (Marvel/IDW)
Duke	2023–2024	Image Comics and Skybound Entertainment	Energon Universe
Cobra Commander	2024	Image Comics and Skybound Entertainment	Energon Universe
Scarlett	2024	Image Comics and Skybound Entertainment	Energon Universe
Destro	2024	Image Comics and Skybound Entertainment	Energon Universe
G.I. Joe	2024–present	Image Comics and Skybound Entertainment	Energon Universe
G.I. Joe: A Real American Hero #21 Silent Missions Edition	2024	Image Comics and Skybound Entertainment	A Real American Hero continuity (Marvel/IDW)
G.I. Joe: A Real American Hero — Silent Missions: Beach Head	2025	Image Comics and Skybound Entertainment	A Real American Hero continuity (Marvel/IDW)
G.I. Joe: A Real American Hero — Silent Missions: Jinx	2025	Image Comics and Skybound Entertainment	A Real American Hero continuity (Marvel/IDW)
G.I. Joe: A Real American Hero — Silent Missions: Spirit	2025	Image Comics and Skybound Entertainment	A Real American Hero continuity (Marvel/IDW)
G.I. Joe: A Real American Hero — Silent Missions: Roadblock	2025	Image Comics and Skybound Entertainment	A Real American Hero continuity (Marvel/IDW)
G.I. Joe: A Real American Hero — Silent Missions: Duke	2025	Image Comics and Skybound Entertainment	A Real American Hero continuity (Marvel/IDW)
Cold Slither	2025	Image Comics and Skybound Entertainment	
G.I. Joe: A Real American Hero #26 Hama Files Edition	2025	Image Comics and Skybound Entertainment	A Real American Hero continuity (Marvel/IDW)
G.I. Joe: A Real American Hero #49 Hama Files Edition	2026	Image Comics and Skybound Entertainment	A Real American Hero continuity (Marvel/IDW)
G.I. Joe: A Real American Hero — Silent Missions: Baroness	2026	Image Comics and Skybound Entertainment	A Real American Hero continuity (Marvel/IDW)
G.I. Joe: A Real American Hero — Silent Missions: Crimson Guard	2026	Image Comics and Skybound Entertainment	A Real American Hero continuity (Marvel/IDW)
G.I. Joe: A Real American Hero — Silent Missions: Zartan	2026	Image Comics and Skybound Entertainment	A Real American Hero continuity (Marvel/IDW)
G.I. Joe: A Real American Hero — Silent Missions: Copperhead	2026	Image Comics and Skybound Entertainment	A Real American Hero continuity (Marvel/IDW)
G.I. Joe: A Real American Hero — Silent Missions: Firefly	2026	Image Comics and Skybound Entertainment	A Real American Hero continuity (Marvel/IDW)

=== Inhumanoids ===
Title	Year	Publisher
Inhumanoids	1987	Star Comics

=== Jem and the Holograms ===
Title	Year	Publisher	Note
Jem and the Holograms	2015–2017	IDW Publishing	Hasbro Comic Book Universe
Jem: The Misfits	2016–2017	IDW Publishing	Hasbro Comic Book Universe
Jem: Infinite	2017	IDW Publishing	Hasbro Comic Book Universe
Jem: Infinite: The Mistfists	2017	IDW Publishing	Hasbro Comic Book Universe
Jem: Dimensions	2017–2018	IDW Publishing	Hasbro Comic Book Universe
Untitled series	2026	Boom! Studios	

=== M.A.S.K.: Mobile Armored Strike Kommand ===
Title	Year	Publisher	Note
M.A.S.K.	1985–1986	DC Comics	
M.A.S.K.: Revolution	2016	IDW Publishing	Hasbro Comic Book Universe
M.A.S.K.	2016–2017	IDW Publishing	Hasbro Comic Book Universe
M.A.S.K.: First Strike	2017	IDW Publishing	Hasbro Comic Book Universe
M.A.S.K.	2026–present	Image Comics and Skybound Entertainment	Energon Universe

=== Magic: The Gathering ===
==== Acclaim Comics ====
- Magic: The Gathering — The Shadow Mage (1995)
- Ice Age on the World of Magic: The Gathering (1995)
- Magic: The Gathering — Nightmare (1995)
- Fallen Empires on the World of Magic: The Gathering (1995)
- Magic: The Gathering: Wayfarer (1995)
- Antiquities War on the World of Magic: The Gathering (1995–1996)
- Magic: The Gathering — Arabian Nights (1995–1996)
- Convocations: A Magic: The Gathering Gallery (1996)
- Serra Angel on the World of Magic: The Gathering (1996)
- Homelands on the World of Magic: The Gathering (1996)
- Legend of Jedit Ojanen on the World of Magic: The Gathering (1996)
- Magic: The Gathering — Shandalar (1996)
- Fallen Angel: A Magic: The Gathering Legend (1996)
- Elder Dragons: A Magic: The Gathering Legend (1996)
- Magic: The Gathering — Dakkon Blackblade (1996)
- Urza-Mishra War on the World of Magic: The Gathering (1996)

==== Dark Horse Comics ====
- Magic: The Gathering — Gerrard's Quest (1998)
- Magic: The Gathering — Untold Stories: Elspeth (2025)
- Magic: The Gathering — Untold Stories: Jace (2026)
- Magic: The Gathering — Untold Stories: Liliana (2026)

==== IDW Publishing ====
- Magic: The Gathering (2011–2012)
- Magic: The Gathering — The Spell Thief (2012)
- Magic: The Gathering — Path of Vengeance (2012–2013)
- Magic: The Gathering — Theros (2013–2014)
- Magic: The Gathering — Chandra (2018–2019)
- Magic: The Gathering — Trials of Alara (2020, cancelled)

==== Boom! Studios ====
- Magic (2021–2023)
- Magic: Master of Metal (2021)
- Magic: The Hidden Planeswaker (2022)
- Magic: Ajani Goldmane (2022)
- Magic: Nahiri the Lithomancer (2022)
- Magic Planeswalkers: Noble (2023)
- Magic Planeswalkers: Notorious (2023)

=== Masked Rider ===
Title	Year	Publishers
Saban's Masked Rider	1996	Marvel Comics

=== Micronauts ===
==== Marvel Comics ====
- The Micronauts (1979–1984)
- The Micronauts: The New Voyages (1984–1986)

==== Image Comics ====
- Micronauts (2003)
- Micronauts: Karza (2003)

==== IDW Publishing ====
- Micronauts (2016–2017)
- Micronauts: Revolution (2016)
- Micronauts: Wrath of Karza (2017)
- Micronauts: First Strike (2017)

=== My Little Pony ===
==== IDW Publishing ====
- My Little Pony: Friendship is Magic (2012–2021)
- My Little Pony Micro-Series (2013)
- My Little Pony: Friends Forever (2014–2017)
- My Little Pony: FIENDship is Magic (2015–2016)
- My Little Pony: Legends of Magic (2017–2018)
- My Little Pony 20/20 (2020)
- My Little Pony: Generations (2021–2022)
- My Little Pony (2022–present)
- My Little Pony: Classics Reimagined — Little Fillies (2022–present)
- My Little Pony 40th Anniversary Special (2023)
- My Little Pony: Bridlewoodstock (2023)
- My Little Pony: Endless Summer (2023)
- My Little Pony: Best of Applejack (2023)
- My Little Pony: Best of Fluttershy (2023)
- My Little Pony: Classics Reimagined — The Unicorn of Odd (2023)
- My Little Pony: Best of Pinkie Pie (2023)
- My Little Pony: Best of Rainbow Dash (2023)
- My Little Pony: Black, White, & Blue (2023)
- My Little Pony: Kenbucky Roller Derby (2024)
- My Little Pony: Classics Reimagined — Valentines Day Special (2024)
- My Little Pony: Best of Rarity (2024)
- My Little Pony: Mane Event (2024).
- My Little Pony: Set Your Sail (2024)
- My Little Pony: Maretime Mysteries (2024)
- My Little Pony: Best of Spike (2024)
- My Little Pony: Classics Reimagined — The Odyssey (2024)
- My Little Pony: The Storm of Zephyr Heights (2024)
- My Little Pony: Best of Cutie Mark Crusaders (2024)
- My Little Pony: Best of Discord (2024)
- My Little Pony: Best of Celestia (2024)
- My Little Pony: Rise of Cadance (2025)
- My Little Pony: Skye's Secret (2025)
- My Little Pony: Hoofloose (2025)
- My Little Pony: Case of the Missing Puff (2025)
- My Little Pony: Tournament of Mysteries (2025)
- My Little Pony: Generation 5 — Greatest Hits (2025)
- My Little Pony: Back to School (2025)
- My Little Pony: Lost Stories of Equestria (2025)
- My Little Pony: Friendship is Spooky (2025)
- My Little Pony: Holiday Collection (2025)
- My Little Pony: The Sweetest Collection (2025)

==== Boom! Studios ====
- My Little Pony: Friendship is Magic (2026–present)

=== Power Rangers ===
==== Boom! Studios ====
- Mighty Morphin Power Rangers (2016–2020)
- Mighty Morphin Power Rangers: Pink (2016–2017)
- Saban's Go Go Power Rangers (2017–2020)
- Power Rangers: Aftershock (2017)
- Mighty Morphin Power Rangers: 25th Anniversary Special (2018)
- Mighty Morphin Power Rangers: Shattered Grid (2018)
- Saban's Go Go Power Rangers: Back to School (2018)
- Power Rangers: Soul of the Dragon (2018)
- Saban's Go Go Power Rangers: Forever Rangers (2019)
- Power Rangers: The Psycho Path (2019)
- Power Rangers: Ranger Slayer (2020)
- Power Rangers: Drakkon New Dawn (2020)
- Power Rangers: Sins of the Future (2020)
- Mighty Morphin (2020–2022)
- Power Rangers (2020–2022)
- Power Rangers Unlimited: Heir to Darkness (2021)
- Power Rangers Unlimited: Edge of Darkness (2021)
- Power Rangers Universe (2021–2022)
- Power Rangers Unlimited: Countdown to Ruin (2022)
- Power Rangers Unlimited: The Death Ranger (2022)
- Mighty Morphin Power Rangers (2022–2024)
- Ranger Academy (2023–2024)
- Power Rangers Unlimited: The Coinless (2023)
- Power Rangers Unlimited: Hyperforce (2023)
- Mighty Morphin Power Rangers: 30th Anniversary Special (2023)
- Power Rangers Unlimited: The Morphin Masters (2024)
- Mighty Morphin Power Rangers: The Return (2024)
- Mighty Morphin Power Rangers: Darkest Hour (2024)
- Power Rangers Infinity (2024)
- Power Rangers: Across the Morphin Grid (2024)
- Power Rangers Prime (2024–2026)
- Mighty Morphin Power Rangers: Rita's Rewind (2025)
- Mighty Morphin Power Rangers Halloween Special (2025)
- Mighty Morphin Power Rangers: Zord Quest (2025)
- Comics' Giveaway Day 2026: Power Rangers #0 (2026)
- Mighty Morphin Power Rangers: Once a Ranger (2026–present)
- Power Rangers Unlimited: Always a Ranger (2026–present)
- Power Rangers Green (2026)

=== Rom the Space Knight ===
Title	Year	Publishers	Note
Rom: Spaceknight	1979–1986	Marvel Comics	Marvel Universe
SpaceKnights	2000–2001	Marvel Comics	Marvel Universe
Rom	2016–2017	IDW Publishing	Hasbro Comic Book Universe
Rom: Revolution	2016	IDW Publishing	Hasbro Comic Book Universe
Rom: First Strike	2017	IDW Publishing	Hasbro Comic Book Universe
Rom: Dire Wraiths	2020	IDW Publishing	Hasbro Comic Book Universe
Rom Special	2026	Image Comics and Skybound Entertainment	Energon Universe

=== Stretch Armstrong ===
Title	Year	Publishers
Stretch Armstrong and the Flex Fighters	2018	IDW Publishing

=== Transformers ===
==== Marvel Comics ====
- The Transformers (1984–1991)
- The Transformers UK (1984–1991, Marvel UK)
- The Transformers: Headmasters (1987–1988)
- Transformers: Generation 2 (1993–1994)

==== 3H Enterprises ====
- Tales from the Beast Wars (1997–1994)
- Transformers: The Wreckers (2001–2004)
- Transformers: Universe (2003–2004)

==== Dreamwave Productions ====
- Transformers: Generation One (2002–2004)
- Transformers: The War Within (2002–2003)
- Transformers: Micromasters (2002–2004)
- Transformers: Armada (2002–2003)
- Transformers: Energon (2004)

==== IDW Publishing ====
- The Transformers: Infiltration (2005–2006)
- The Transformers: Evolutions — Hearts of Steel (2006)
- The Transformers: Stormbringer (2006)
- The Transformers: Spotlight (2006–2013)
- The Transformers: Escalation (2006–2007)
- The Transformers: Megatron Origin (2007)
- The Transformers: Devastation (2007–2008)
- The Transformers: All Hail Megatron (2008–2009)
- The Transformers: Maximum Dinobots (2008–2011)
- The Transformers (2008–2011)
- The Transformers: Bumblebee (2009–2010)
- The Transformers: Last Stand of the Wreckers (2010–2011)
- The Transformers: Ironhide (2010)
- The Transformers: Drift (2010)
- The Transformers: Infestation (2011)
- The Transformers: Heart of Darkness (2011)
- The Transformers: The Death of Optimus Prime (2011)
- The Transformers: More than Meets the Eye (2012–2016)
- Transformers: Regeneration One (2012–2014)
- The Transformers: Autocracy (2012)
- The Transformers: Robots in Disguise (2012–2016)
- Infestation 2: The Transformers (2012)
- The Transformers: Monstrosity (2013)
- The Transformers: Dark Cybertron (2013)
- The Transformers: Dark Cybertron Finale (2013)
- The Transformers: Windblade (2014)
- The Transformers: Punishment (2014)
- The Transformers: Primacy (2014–2015)
- The Transformers: Drift — Empire of Stone (2014–2015)
- The Transformers: Windblade (2015)
- Transformers: Combiner Hunters (2015)
- Transformers: Redemption (2015)
- Transformers: Sins of the Wreckers (2015–2016)
- Transformers: Deviations (2016)
- Transformers: Till All are One (2016–2017)
- Transformers: Till All are One: Revolution (2016)
- Transformers: Revolution (2016)
- Transformers: More than Meets the Eye: Revolution (2016)
- Optimus Prime (2016–2018)
- Transformers: Lost Light (2016–2018)
- Optimus Prime: First Strike (2017)
- Transformers: First Strike (2017)
- Transformers: Bumblebee — Win If You Dare (2018)
- Transformers: Unicron (2018)
- Transformers: Bumblebee — Go For the Gold (2018)
- Transformers: Last Stand of the Wreckers (2018)
- Transformers (2019–2022)
- Transformers: Galaxies (2019–2020)
- Transformers '84: Secrets & Lies (2019–2020)
- Transformers: Escape (2020–2021)
- Transformers: Beast Wars (2021–2022)
- Transformers: King Grimlock (2021–2022)
- Transformers: Shattered Glass (2021)
- Wreckers: Tread & Circuits (2021–2022)
- Transformers: Best of Optimus Prime (2022)
- Transformers: War's End (2022)
- Transformers: Best of Megatron (2022)
- Transformers: Last Bot Standing (2022)
- Transformers: Best of Hot Rod (2022)
- Transformers: Fate of Cybertron (2022)
- Transformers: Best of the Beasts (2022)
- Transformers: Best of the Rarities (2022)
- Transformers: Shattered Glass II (2022)
- Transformers: Best of Bumblebee (2022)
- Transformers: Best of Starscream (2022)
- Transformers: Best of Arcee (2022)
- Transformers: Best of Grimlock (2022)
- Transformers: Best of Shockwave (2022)
- Transformers: Best of Windblade (2022)
- Transformers: Collision Course (2022, cancelled)

==== Image Comics and Skybound Entertainment ====
Title	Year	Note
Transformers	2023–present	Energon Universe
The Transformers 40th Anniversary Edition	2024	Marvel Comics continuity
Transformers: Worst Bot Ever — Meet Ballpoint	2025	Skybound Comet
Transformers: Worst Bot Ever — Bot Swap!	2026	Skybound Comet
Transformers: Bumblebee — Lost Planet	2027	Skybound Visions

=== Visionaries: Knights of the Magical Light ===
Title	Year	Publishers
Visionaries: Knights of the Magical Light	1987–1988	Star Comics

=== VR Troopers ===
Title	Year	Publishers	Note
VR Troopers	2025–2026	Boom! Studios	Power Rangers Prime tie-in

=== Original comics ===
Title	Year	Publishers	Note
Unit:E	2011	HasLab	San Diego Comic-Con 2011 exclusive
Void Rivals	2023–present	Image Comics and Skybound Entertainment	Energon Universe

=== Crossover comics ===
Title	Year	Publishers	Note
The X-Men and the Micronauts	1984	Marvel Comics	Marvel Universe
G.I. Joe and The Transformers	1987	Marvel Comics	
Saban Presents: Power Rangers Turbo vs. Beetleborgs Metallix	1997	Acclaim Comics	

==== 2000s ====
- Transformers/G.I. Joe (2003–2004, Dreamwave Productions)
- Transformers/G.I. Joe: Divided Front (2004, Dreamwave Productions)
- G.I. Joe vs. The Transformers (2003, Image Comics and Devil's Due Publishing)
- G.I. Joe vs. The Transformers II (2004, Devil's Due Publishing)
- G.I. Joe vs. The Transformers III: The Art of War (2006, Devil's Due Publishing)
- G.I. Joe vs. The Transformers IV: Black Horizon (2007, Devil's Due Publishing)
- New Avengers/Transformers (2007, Marvel Comics and IDW Publishing)

==== 2010s ====
- The Transformers vs. G.I. Joe (2014, IDW Publishing)
- Street Fighter X G.I. Joe (2016, IDW Publishing)
- Revolution (2016, IDW Publishing)
- The Transformers vs. G.I. Joe: The Movie Adaptation (2016, IDW Publishing)
- Revolutionaries (2017, IDW Publishing)
- Hasbro Heroes Sourcebook (2017, IDW Publishing)
- First Strike (2017, IDW Publishing)
- Aw Yeah Revolution! (2017, IDW Publishing)
- Justice League/Mighty Morphin Power Rangers (2017, DC Comics and Boom! Studios)
- Rom vs. Transformers: Shining Armor (2017, IDW Publishing)
- Rom/Micronauts (2017–2018, IDW Publishing)
- When Worlds Collide (2017, Grey Global Group, for HasCon)
- Transformers vs. Visionaries (2018, IDW Publishing)
- G.I. Joe: A Real American Hero vs. The Six Million Dollar Man (2018, IDW Publishing with Dynamite Entertainment)
- Rick and Morty vs. Dungeons & Dragons (2018–2019, Oni Press and IDW Publishing)
- Transformers/Ghostbusters (2019, IDW Publishing)
- Mighty Morphin Power Rangers/Teenage Mutant Ninja Turtles (2019–2020, Boom! Studios and IDW Publishing)
- Rick and Morty vs. Dungeons & Dragons: Chapter II: Painscape (2019–2020, Oni Press and IDW Publishing)

==== 2020s ====
- My Little Pony/Transformers: Friendship in Disguise! (2020, IDW Publishing)
- Transformers vs. The Terminator (2020, IDW Publishing and Dark Horse Comics)
- Transformers/Back to the Future (2020–2021, IDW Publishing)
- Stranger Things and Dungeons & Dragons (2020–2021, Dark Horse Comics and IDW Publishing)
- My Little Pony/Transformers: The Magic of Cybertron (2021, IDW Publishing)
- Godzilla vs. Mighty Morphin Power Rangers (2022, IDW Publishing and Boom! Studios)
- Rick and Morty vs. Dungeons & Dragons: The Meeseeks Adventures (2022, Oni Press and IDW Publishing)
- Mighty Morphin Power Rangers/Teenage Mutant Ninja Turtles II (2022–2023, Boom! Studios and IDW Publishing)
- Rom and the X-Men: Marvel Tales (2023, Marvel Comics)
- Godzilla vs. Mighty Morphin Power Rangers II (2024, IDW Publishing and Boom! Studios)
- Energon Universe 2024 Special (2024, Image Comics and Skybound Entertainment)
- Mighty Morphin Power Rangers/Usagi Yojimbo (2024, Boom! Studios and Dark Horse Comics)
- Stranger Things and Dungeons & Dragons: The Rise of Hellfire (2025, Dark Horse Comics)
- Energon Universe 2025 Special (2025, Image Comics and Skybound Entertainment)
- Power Rangers/VR Troopers (2025, Boom! Studios)
- Mighty Morphin Power Rangers/Teenage Mutant Ninja Turtles III (2025–2026, Boom! Studios and IDW Publishing)
- Energon Universe 2026 Special (2026, Image Comics and Skybound Entertainment)
- G.I. Joe: A Real American Hero X Tomb Raider (2026, Image Comics and Skybound Entertainment)

== See also ==
- Hasbro Comic Book Universe (2005–2018)
  - Hasbro Reconstruction
- Energon Universe (2023–present)
