= Rom: Dire Wraiths =

- Issue #1's cover A.

Publication information
- Publisher: IDW Publishing
- Format: Limited series
- Genre: Horror; Science fiction; Superhero
- Publication date: January 15 – December 30, 2020
- No. of issues: 3

Creative team
- Written by: Chris Ryall
- Pencillers: Sal Buscema; Guy Dorian Sr.; Luca Pizzari
- Letterer: Shawn Lee
- Colorists: Jim Boswell; Ross Campbell
- Editor: David Marionette

Rom: Dire Wraiths is a superhero comic book miniseries by Chris Ryall, Luca Pizzari, Guy Dorian Sr and Sal Buscema. Based on Hasbro's Rom the Space Knight franchise and published by IDW Publishing, it follows the Dire Wraiths and acts as a spin-off prequel to the 2016—2017 Rom series, also being the final title in the Hasbro Comic Book Universe.

The series debuted on January 15, and concluded on December 30, 2020, following the impact of the COVID-19 pandemic on the comic book industry.

== Premise ==
The main story features NASA's Apollo 11 astronaut crew during the 1969 Moon landing, where they will confront the inhuman presence of Dire Wraiths waiting to conquer Earth.

A back-up story features what happened to Rom during those events.

== Publication history ==
=== Background ===
After IDW Publishing acquired the comic book licence of Rom and other Hasbro brands, the company announced in January 2016 the Reconstruction campaign to converge these franchises in the Hasbro Comic Book Universe, featuring the crossover events Revolution and First Strike.

This shared continuity, the Hasbro Comic Book Universe (HCBU), ended with Transformers: Unicron in November 2018.

=== Development ===
The series was revealed to be in development at San Diego Comic-Con 2019. The series contains three issues written by returning Rom writer Chris Ryall, with art by Luca Pizzari. A back-up story was written by Ryall, with art by returning artists Guy Dorian Sr. (pencils) and Sal Buscema (inks). Ryall said that "returning to Rom for any reason is a happy occasion. Being able to use this story as a way to celebrate the monumental journey of American heroes is even better".

The series debuted on January 15, 2020. Due to the effect of the COVID-19 pandemic over comic book industry, the third and final issue was delayed for December 30 the same year.

== Issues ==
| Issue | Title | Written by | Drawn by | Colored by | Publication date |
|---|---|---|---|---|---|
| #1 | "One Small Step for Dire Wraith-kind, Part 1" | Chris Ryall | Guy Dorian Sr. and Luca Pizzari | Jim Boswell | January 15, 2020 |
In July 1969, the Apollo 11 crew (Neil Armstrong, Buzz Aldrin and Michael Collins) was landing on the Moon, joined by members of the Adventure-One Team (Arsenal, Badger, Hank, Mixmaster, Scalpel and Dr. Sandra Shen). Unaware to any of them, a small group of Dire Wraiths was marooned on the Moon, waiting to bring the rest of their race to colonize the Earth. After noticing the humans' presence, the Wraiths have decided to take advantage; Hank is killed by a Red Wraith who takes his form.
| #1 | "One Small Step for a Spaceknight, Part 1" | Chris Ryall | Sal Buscema | Ross Campbell | January 15, 2020 |
Prior to events on the Apollo 11's Moon landing, the same Dire Wraiths were on planet Marn-33, trying to steal the life force of Spaceknight Dhorian. Despite Dhorian fought back the best he could, killing a Wraith High Priestess in the process, he was outnumbered, and his life force was taken away, but not before his comrades Rom and Nikomi became aware of his death. The Wraiths used that energy to transport themselves to Earth.
| #2 | "One Small Step for Dire Wraith-kind, Part 2" | Chris Ryall | Guy Dorian Sr. and Luca Pizzari | Jim Boswell | March 11, 2020 |
During the fight between the Adventure-One Team and the Dire Wraiths on the Moon, the Blue Wraiths kill Arsenal, Mixmaster and Scalpel, while the Wraith impersonating Hank kills one of the astronauts before receiving a transmission from Dr. Shore.
| #2 | "One Small Step for a Spaceknight, Part 2" | Chris Ryall | Sal Buscema | Ross Campbell | March 11, 2020 |
Upon arriving at Marn-33, Rom and Nikomi find the portal to Earth, but Dhorian's body and armor are possessed by the same Red Wraith who killed him. The Wraith uses the armor to escape to Earth, taking Rom and Nikomi with him.
| #3 | "One Small Step for Dire Wraith-kind, Part 3" | Chris Ryall | Guy Dorian Sr. and Luca Pizzari | Jim Boswell | December 30, 2020 |
Dr. Shen manages to kill the Red Wraith that murdered Hank while gaining a blood sample from its body. Meanwhile, Badger and the last two astronauts continue fighting the last Blue Wraith, but the latter kills Badger in order to escape Earth. Luckily for the astronauts, Rom arrives in time to kill the Blue Wraith. The astronauts return to Earth, unaware that one of them is actually another Dire Wraith.
| #3 | "One Small Step for a Spaceknight, Part 3" | Chris Ryall | Sal Buscema | Ross Campbell | December 30, 2020 |
Rom and Nikomi destroy the Dire Wriath impersonating Dhorian, but as the portal closes, Nikomi decides to send Rom back while staying marooned in the process. Rom then uses his neutralizer to open a portal to Earth and save the astronauts on the Moon.

== Reception ==
| Issue | Publication date | Critic rating | Critic reviews | Ref. |
|---|---|---|---|---|
| #1 | January 15, 2020 | 6.5/10 | 7 | |
| #2 | March 11, 2020 | 5.7/10 | 3 | |
| #3 | December 30, 2020 | 6.5/10 | 2 | |
| Overall | —N/a | 6.3/10 | 13 | |

== Collected editions ==
| Title | Material collected | Pages | Publication date | ISBN | Ref. |
|---|---|---|---|---|---|
| Rom: Dire Wraiths | Rom: Dire Wraiths #1−3 | 96 | January 20, 2021 | 1684056810, 978-1684056811 | |

== See also ==
- Apollo 11 in popular culture
