= Hasbro Comic Book Universe =

American comic book franchise

- Official teaser for 2016's Revolution.
- Publisher: IDW Publishing
- Publication date: October 2005 – December 2020
- Genre: Various
- Main characters: Action Man; Army Ants; Beast Wars; Clue; G.I. Joe; Inhumanoids; Jem; M.A.S.K.; Micronauts; Rom; Transformers; Visionaries

The Hasbro Comic Book Universe (HCBU) is an American comic book franchise and shared universe created and published by IDW Publishing, based on various properties of the toy company Hasbro.

== Publication history ==
Following the bankruptcy of Dreamwave Productions in 2005, IDW picked up the Transformers comic book license and hired veteran writer Simon Furman to craft a rebooted continuity based on the Generation 1 toy line, similar to what Marvel Comics did through Ultimate Marvel.

In May 2008, IDW obtained the G.I. Joe comic book license from Devil's Due Publishing.

Over the years, both comics participated in several crossover events, like Infestation and Infestation 2.

In 2016, IDW gained the rights of Rom, Micronauts, Action Man and M.A.S.K. from other publishers. That same year, IDW announced the Hasbro Reconstruction campaign, in order to converge those brands in the same continuity, starting with the crossover event Revolution.

In 2017, IDW gained the rights of Visionaries, with most of its characters debuting after the crossover event First Strike.

In April 2018, IDW announced the HCBU would conclude with the limited series Transformers: Unicron in November 2018.

== In-continuity canon ==
IDW has never established a shared continuity between its own Transformers and G.I. Joe comics, even during the crossover event Infestation, when they both exist in separate universes, with other licensed franchises. While The Transformers has only participated in Infestation, the miniseries The Transformers: Hearts of Steel, also set in its own alternate timeline, has participated in Infestation 2. On the other side, G.I. Joe participated in both events.

While other brands exist within the HCBU (e.g. Jem and Clue), they did not appear in Revolution, First Strike or Transformers: Unicron for tonal reasons. IDW's versions of My Little Pony, Dungeons & Dragons, Magic: The Gathering, Stretch Armstrong and Go-Bots exist "outside" of this universe entirely.

== List of works ==
=== 2005 ===
Title	Issue(s)	Premiere date	Finale date	Note(s)	Ref.
The Transformers: Infiltration	0–6	October 19, 2005	July 12, 2006		

=== 2006 ===
Title	Issue(s)	Premiere date	Finale date	Note(s)	Ref.
The Transformers: Evolutions — Hearts of Steel	1–4	July 5, 2006	September 27, 2006		
The Transformers: Stormbringer	1–4	July 19, 2006	October 18, 2006		
The Transformers: Spotlight	31 (unnumbered)	September 13, 2006	May 1, 2013		
The Transformers: Escalation	1–6	November 29, 2006	May 2, 2007	Sequel to The Transformers: Infiltration.	

=== 2007 ===
Title	Issue(s)	Premiere date	Finale date	Note(s)	Ref.
The Transformers: Megatron Origin	1–4	June 20, 2007	October 24, 2007		
The New Avengers/The Transformers	1–4	July 5, 2007	October 10, 2007	Crossover with the New Avengers (Marvel Comics).	
The Transformers: Devastation	1–6	October 3, 2007	February 27, 2008	Sequel to The Transformers: Escalation.	

=== 2008 ===
Title	Issue(s)	Premiere date	Finale date	Note(s)	Ref.
The Transformers: All Hail Megatron	1–16	July 10, 2008	October 14, 2009		
G.I. Joe (vol. 1)	0–27 (plus 1 special)	October 22, 2008	February 23, 2011		
The Transformers: Maximum Dinobots	1–5	December 10, 2008	April 15, 2009		

=== 2009 ===
Title	Issue(s)	Premiere date	Finale date	Note(s)	Ref.
G.I. Joe: Origins	1–23	February 2009	January 2011		
G.I. Joe: Cobra (vol. 1)	1–4	March 2009	June 2009		
G.I. Joe: Cobra Special	1–2	September 2009	September 2010	Tie-in to G.I. Joe: Cobra (vol. 1).	
The Transformers	1–31	November 18, 2009	December 7, 2011	Sequel to The Transformers: All Hail Megatron.	
The Transformers: Bumblebee	1–4	December 16, 2009	March 10, 2010		

=== 2010 ===
Title	Issue(s)	Premiere date	Finale date	Note(s)	Ref.
G.I. Joe: Cobra II	1–13	January 2010	February 2011		
The Transformers: Last Stand of the Wreckers	1–5	January 27, 2010	May 19, 2010		
G.I. Joe: Hearts & Minds	1–5	May 2010	September 2010		
The Transformers: Ironhide	1–4	May 12, 2010	August 4, 2010		
The Transformers: Drift	1–4	September 2010	October 20, 2010		

=== 2011 ===
Title	Issue(s)	Premiere date	Finale date	Note(s)	Ref.
The Transformers: Infestation	1–2	February 2, 2011	February 16, 2011	Part of the crossover event Infestation.	
G.I. Joe: Infestation	1–2	March 2, 2011	March 16, 2011	Part of the crossover event Infestation.	
The Transformers: Heart of Darkness	1–4	March 23, 2011	June 29, 2011		
G.I. Joe: Cobra Civil War	One-shot	April 1, 2011		Prelude to Cobra Civil War.	
G.I. Joe (vol. 2)	1–21	May 2011	January 2013		
G.I. Joe Cobra: Cobra Civil War	1–21	May 2011	December 2012		
G.I. Joe: Snake Eyes	1–21	May 18, 2011	February 6, 2013	Separated inside three storylines.	
The Transformers: The Death of Optimus Prime	One-shot	December 21, 2011			

=== 2012 ===
Title	Issue(s)	Premiere date	Finale date	Note(s)	Ref.
The Transformers: More than Meets the Eye	1–57 (plus 1 annual)	January 11, 2012	September 28, 2016	Issues #23-27 tied to Dark Cybertron; retitled as Transformers: More than Meets the Eye in issue #39 issues #56-57 tied to Titans Return.	
The Transformers: Autocracy	1–12	January 18, 2012	June 20, 2012		
The Transformers: Robots in Disguise	1–57 (plus 1 annual)	January 25, 2012	September 28, 2016	Issues #23-27 tied to Dark Cybertron; retitled as The Transformers (vol. 2) in issue #35; retitled as Transformers in issue #39; issues #56-57 tied to Titans Return.	
The Transformers: Infestation 2	1–2	February 1, 2012	February 15, 2012	Part of the crossover event Infestation 2; related to The Transformers: Hearts of Steel.	
G.I. Joe: Infestation 2	1–2	March 14, 2012	March 28, 2012	Part of the crossover event Infestation 2.	

=== 2013 ===
Title	Issue(s)	Premiere date	Finale date	Note(s)	Ref.
G.I. Joe (vol. 3)	1–15	February 2013	April 2014		
G.I. Joe: Special Missions	1–13	March 2013	April 2014		
The Transformers: Monstrosity	1–12, 1-4	March 1, 2013	July 31, 2013	Sequel to The Transformers: Autocracy; later printed across four issues.	
G.I. Joe: The Cobra Files	1–9	April 2013	December 2013		
The Transformers: Dark Cybertron	One-shot	November 6, 2013		Chapter 1 of Dark Cybertron.	

=== 2014 ===
Title	Issue(s)	Premiere date	Finale date	Note(s)	Ref.
The Transformers: Dark Cybertron Finale	One-shot	March 26, 2014		Final Chapter of Dark Cybertron.	
The Transformers: Windblade (vol. 1)	1–4	April 16, 2014	July 23, 2014		
The Transformers: Punishment	1–5	June 2014 (printed on January 21, 2015)		Digital comic; later printed as an annual-sized one-shot.	
The Transformers: Primacy	1–4	August 13, 2014	November 19, 2014	Sequel to The Transformers: Monstrosity.	
G.I. Joe (vol. 4)	1–8	September 2014	April 2015	Retitled as The Fall of G.I. Joe.	
The Transformers: Drift — Empire of Stone	1–4	November 26, 2014	February 25, 2015	Sequel to The Transformers: Drift.	

=== 2015 ===
Title	Issue(s)	Premiere date	Finale date	Note(s)	Ref.
G.I. Joe: Snake Eyes — Agent of Cobra	1–5	January 2015	May 2015		
Jem and the Holograms	1–26 (plus 1 annual and 2 specials)	March 25, 2015	June 14, 2017		
The Transformers: Windblade (vol. 2)	1–7	March 25, 2015	September 23, 2015	Sequel to The Transformers: Windblade (vol. 1); issues #1-3 tied to Combiner Wars.	
Transformers: Combiner Hunters	One-shot	July 29, 2015		Tied to Combiner Wars.	
Transformers: Redemption	One-shot	October 28, 2015		Sequel to The Transformers: Punishment.	
Transformers: Sins of the Wreckers	1–5	October 2015	June 2016	Sequel to The Transformers: Last Stand of the Wreckers.	

=== 2016 ===
Title	Issue(s)	Premiere date	Finale date	Note(s)	Ref.
Micronauts	1–11 (plus 1 annual)	April 27, 2016	April 12, 2017		
Transformers: Till All are One	1–12 (plus 1 annual)	June 15, 2016	December 13, 2017	Sequel to The Transformers: Windblade; issues #5-8 tied to Titans Return.	
Revolution	0–5	June 21, 2016	November 30, 2016		
Action Man	1–4	June 22, 2016	September 21, 2016		
Rom	0–14 (plus 1 annual)	July 27, 2016	November 1, 2017		
Transformers: Titans Return	One-shot	July 27, 2016		Prologue to Titans Return.	
Transformers: Revolution	One-shot	October 26, 2016		Part of the crossover event Revolution.	
Transformers: Till All are One: Revolution	One-shot	November 2, 2016		Part of the crossover event Revolution.	
G.I. Joe: Revolution	One-shot	November 16, 2016		Part of the crossover event Revolution.	
Rom: Revolution	One-shot	September 21, 2016		Part of the crossover event Revolution.	
Micronauts: Revolution	One-shot	September 28, 2016		Part of the crossover event Revolution.	
M.A.S.K.: Mobile Armored Strike Kommand: Revolution	One-shot	September 29, 2016		Part of the crossover event Revolution.	
Action Man: Revolution	One-shot	October 26, 2016		Part of the crossover event Revolution.	
M.A.S.K.: Mobile Armored Strike Kommand	1–10 (plus 1 annual)	November 30, 2016	October 11, 2017		
Transformers: More than Meets the Eye: Revolution	One-shot	December 7, 2016		Part of the crossover event Revolution.	
Optimus Prime	1–25 (plus 1 annual)	December 14, 2016	November 21, 2018	Sequel to The Transformers: Robots in Disguise.	
Transformers: Lost Light	1–25	December 14, 2016	November 7, 2018	Sequel to The Transformers: More than Meets the Eye.	
Jem: The Misfits	1–5	December 21, 2016	July 6, 2017	Spin-off of Jem and the Holograms.	
G.I. Joe (vol. 5)	1–9	December 28, 2016	October 11, 2017		

=== 2017 ===
Title	Issue(s)	Premiere date	Finale date	Note(s)	Ref.
Revolutionaries	1–8	January 18, 2017	September 27, 2017	Team-up between various Hasbro characters.	
Transformers Annual 2017	One-shot	March 9, 2017			
Micronauts: Wrath of Karza	1–5	April 26, 2017	September 20, 2017	Sequel to Micronauts.	
Transformers: Salvation	One-shot	June 14, 2017		Sequel to Transformers: Redemption.	
Hasbro Heroes Sourcebook	1–3	July 14, 2017	October 25, 2017	Featuring various background stories.	
First Strike	0–6	July 14, 2017	October 25, 2017	Sequel to Revolution.	
Rom vs. Transformers: Shining Armor	1–5	July 19, 2017	November 27, 2017		
Jem: Infinite	1–6	June 29, 2017	October 19, 2017	Crossover event between Jem and the Holograms and Jem: The Misfits.	
Clue	1–6	June 29, 2017	November 23, 2017		
G.I Joe: First Strike	One-shot	September 20, 2017		Part of the crossover event First Strike.	
Micronauts: First Strike	One-shot	September 27, 2017		Part of the crossover event First Strike.	
Optimus Prime: First Strike	One-shot	October 18, 2017		Part of the crossover event First Strike.	
Rom: First Strike	One-shot	October 18, 2017		Part of the crossover event First Strike.	
M.A.S.K.: Mobile Armored Strike Kommand: First Strike	One-shot	November 1, 2017		Part of the crossover event First Strike.	
Transformers: First Strike	One-shot	November 8, 2017		Part of the crossover event First Strike.	
Jem: Dimensions	1–4	December 6, 2017	March 7, 2018		
Rom & the Micronauts	1–5	December 20, 2017	May 9, 2018		
Scarlett's Strike Force	1–3	December 27, 2017	February 28, 2018		

=== 2018 ===
Title	Issue(s)	Premiere date	Finale date	Note(s)	Ref.
Transformers vs. Visionaries	1–5	January 3, 2018	May 2, 2018		
Rom: Tales of the Solstar Order	One-shot	April 4, 2018		Back-up strips published in Rom #11–14.	
Transformers: Unicron	0–6	May 5, 2018	November 14, 2018		
Transformers: Requiem of the Wreckers	One-shot	May 30, 2018		Sequel to Transformers: Sins of the Wreckers.	

=== 2019 ===
Title	Issue(s)	Premiere date	Finale date	Note(s)	Ref.
Synergy: A Hasbro Creators Showcase	One-shot	March 27, 2019		Contains stories for G.I. Joe, Transformers, and Jem and the Holograms.	

=== 2020 ===
Title	Issue(s)	Premiere date	Finale date	Note(s)	Ref.
Rom: Dire Wraiths	1–3	January 15, 2020	December 30, 2020	Prequel and spin-off to Rom, uses characters from Inhumanoids.	

== Major storylines ==
- "All Hail Megatron"
- "Infestation"
- "Chaos"
- "Cobra Civil War"
- "Cobra Command"
- "Infestation 2"
- "Dark Cybertron"
- "Revolution"
- "First Strike"
- "Unicron"

== Tie-in books ==
- The Transformers: Continuum (November 11, 2009) – First guidebook of the HCBU-related Transformers comics.
- G.I. Joe: Tales from the Cobra Wars (April 19, 2011) – Anthology of prose stories based on several HCBU-related G.I. Joe comics.
- Transformers: Historia (January 9, 2019) – Second guidebook of the HCBU-related Transformers comics.

== Unproduced works ==
- Transformers: Legacy of Rust
- Transformers: Spy Games
- Transformers: Collision Course

== See also ==
- List of comics based on Hasbro properties
- Hasbro Universe
  - Energon Universe, the successor of the HCBU by Skybound Entertainment.
