= Hasbro Reconstruction =

2016 comic book launch

- Promotional logo

Publication information
- Publisher: IDW Publishing; Hasbro, Inc.
- Publication date: June 2016 – November 2018
- Main character: Hasbro Comic Book Universe

Hasbro Reconstruction was a 2016 comic book launch by IDW Publishing about its line of comic books based on properties of the toy company Hasbro. Since June 2016, this branding converged most of IDW's Hasbro comics into the Hasbro Comic Book Universe, using the end of Revolution as its launching pod, which then continued with First Strike. For November 2018, IDW concluded the branding.

== Background ==
The Hasbro Reconstruction branding serves to converge IDW's own versions of Transformers and G.I. Joe into a shared universe of characters from various Hasbro brands, which had started with Simon Furman and E. J. Su's The Transformers: Infiltration on October 19, 2005. Rom and Micronauts reappeared on 2016 after Hasbro regained their comic book rights from Marvel Comics. Action Man and M.A.S.K. were the last additions for the event series Revolution. Between 2017 and 2018, the characters of Visionaries debuted on the aftermath of the event series First Strike. The Reconstruction branding concluded with the Transformers: Unicron miniseries.

== Titles ==
=== Ongoing series ===
Title	Publication dates / Issues	Initial creative team	Notes / References
Transformers: Till All are One	June 15, 2016 – December 13, 2017 (5–14; plus 1 annual)	Writer; Mairghread Scott; Artist; Sara Pitre-Durocher	Sequel to The Transformers: Windblade. Focusing on Windblade and Starscream.
Action Man	June 22 – September 21, 2016 (1–4)	Writer; John Barber; Artists; Chris Evenhuis; Paolo Villanelli	Focusing on Action Man.
Revolution	July 21 – November 30, 2016 (0–5)	Writers; John Barber; Cullen Bunn; Artists; Fico Ossio	
Micronauts	November 16, 2016 – April 12, 2017 (7–11; plus 1 annual)	Writer; Cullen Bunn; Artist; David Baldeon	Focusing on Pharoid, Space Glider, Orbital Defender, Microtron, Acroyear and Biotron.
Rom	November 23, 2016 – November 1, 2017 (5–14; plus 1 annual)	Writers; Chris Ryall; Christos N. Gage; Artists; David Messina; Paolo Villainelli	Focusing on Rom.
M.A.S.K.: Mobile Armored Strike Kommand	November 30, 2016 – October 11, 2017 (1–10; plus 1 annual)	Writer; Brandon M. Easton; Artists; Tommy Lee Edwards; Tony Vargas	Spinning out of the events of Revolution. Focusing on Spectrum, Aura, Eclipse and Gulliver.
Optimus Prime	December 14, 2016 – November 21, 2018 (1–25; plus 1 annual)	Writer; John Barber; Artist; Kei Zama	Sequel to The Transformers: Robots in Disguise. Focusing on Optimus Prime.
Transformers: Lost Light	December 14, 2016 – November 7, 2018 (1–25)	Writer; James Roberts; Artist; Jack Lawrence	Sequel to The Transformers: More than Meets the Eye. Focusing on Rodimus and Megatron.
G.I. Joe	December 28, 2016 – October 11, 2017 (1–9)	Writer; Aubrey Sitterson; Artist; Giannis Milonogiannis	Spinning out of the events of Revolution. Focusing on Scarlett, Roadblock, Rock ‘n Roll, Quick Kick, Wild Bill, Shipwreck and former Decepticon Skywarp.
Revolutionaries	January 18 – September 27, 2017 (1–8)	Writer; John Barber; Artists; Fico Ossio; Sebastian Cheng	Spinning out of the events of Revolution. Focusing on Action Man, Kup, Ayana Jones and G. B. Blackrock.
Micronauts: Wrath of Karza	April 26 – September 20, 2017 (1–5)	Writers; Cullen Bunn; Jimmy Johnston; Artist; Andrew Griffith	Sequel to Micronauts. Focusing on Baron Karza.
Hasbro Heroes Sourcebook	June 7 – August 30, 2017 (1–3)	Writers; Various; Artists; Various	Featuring various background stories of IDW's Hasbro Universe.
First Strike	July 14 – October 25, 2017 (0–6)	Writers; Mairghread Scott; David Rodriguez; Artists; Max Dunbar; Freddie E. Williams II	
Rom vs. Transformers: Shining Armor	July 19 – November 27, 2017 (1–5)	Writers; John Barber; Christos N. Gage; Artist; Alex Milne	Focusing on Stardrive, a Transformer that was raised and recruited by the Solstar Order.
Rom & the Micronauts	December 20, 2017 - May 9, 2018 (1–5)	Writer; Christos N. Gage; Artist; Paolo Villanelli	Spinning out of the events of First Strike. Featuring Rom teaming up with the Micronauts.
Scarlett's Strike Force	December 27, 2017 – February 28, 2018 (1–3)	Writer; Aubrey Sitterson; Artist; Nelson Daniel	Spinning out of the events of First Strike. Focusing on Scarlett and her own G.I. Joe team, with the addition of Spectrum from M.A.S.K. Cancelled after three issues.
Transformers vs. Visionaries	January 3 – May 2, 2018 (1–5)	Writer; Magdalene Visaggio; Artist; Fico Ossio	Spinning out of the events of First Strike. Focusing on Ironhide and the Spectral Knights.
Transformers: Unicron	May 5 – November 14, 2018 (0–6)	Writer; John Barber; Artist; Alex Milne	Focusing on Unicron.

=== One-shots ===
Title	Publication date	Initial creative team	Notes / References
Rom: Revolution #1	September 21, 2016	Writer; Chris Ryall; Artist; Christos N. Gage	Tie-in to Revolution.
M.A.S.K.: Mobile Armored Strike Kommand: Revolution #1	September 28, 2016	Writer; Brandon M. Easton; Artist; Anthony Vargas	Tie-in to Revolution.
Micronauts: Revolution #1	September 28, 2016	Writer; Cullen Bunn; Artist; Chris Panda	Tie-in to Revolution.
Transformers: Revolution #1	October 26, 2016	Writer; John Barber; Artist; Andrew Griffith	Tie-in to Revolution.
Action Man: Revolution #1	October 26, 2016	Writer; John Barber; Artist; Drew Johnson	Tie-in to Revolution.
Transformers: Till All are One: Revolution #1	November 2, 2016	Writer; Mairghread Scott; Artist; Naoto Tsushima	Tie-in to Revolution.
G.I. Joe: Revolution #1	November 15, 2016	Writer; Aubrey Sitterson; Artist; Giannis Milonogiannis	Tie-in to Revolution.
Transformers: More than Meets the Eye: Revolution #1	December 7, 2016	Writers; James Roberts; Nick Roche; Artist; Alex Milne	Tie-in to Revolution.
Transformers Annual 2017	March 9, 2017	Writer; John Barber; Artist; Priscilla Tramontano	
Transformers: Salvation	June 14, 2017	Writers; John Barber; Artist; Livio Ramondelli	Sequel to The Transformers: Punishment and Transformers: Redemption. Focusing on the Dinobots.
G.I. Joe: First Strike #1	September 20, 2017	Writers; Aubrey Sitterson; Artist; Ilias Kyriazis	Tie-in to First Strike.
Micronauts: First Strike #1	September 27, 2017	Writers; Christos N. Gage; Artist; Chris Panda	Tie-in to First Strike.
Optimus Prime: First Strike #1	October 18, 2017	Writers; John Barber; Artist; Guido Guidi	Tie-in to First Strike.
Rom: First Strike #1	October 18, 2017	Writers; Christos N. Gage; Artist; Chris Panda	Tie-in to First Strike.
M.A.S.K.: Mobile Armored Strike Kommand: First Strike #1	November 1, 2017	Writers; Aubrey Sitterson; Artist; Ilias Kyriazis	Tie-in to First Strike.
Transformers: First Strike #1	November 8, 2017	Writers; John Barber; Artist; Guido Guidi	Tie-in to First Strike.
Rom: Tales of the Solstar Order	April 4, 2018	Writers; Chris Ryall; Christos N. Gage; Artists; Guy Dorian; Sal Buscema	Back-up strips published in Rom #11-14.
Transformers: Requiem of the Wreckers	May 30, 2018	Writer; Nick Roche; Artists; Josh Burcham; Geoff Senior; Guido Guidi	Sequel to The Transformers: Last Stand of the Wreckers and The Transformers: Sins of the Wreckers. Focusing on Verity Carlo and the Wreckers.
Transformers: Historia	January 9, 2019	Writer; Chris McFeely; Artists; Various	Guide of all Transformers comic books set in the HCBU, similar to The Transformers: Continuum.

== See also ==
- List of comics based on Hasbro properties
