= General Joseph Colton =

Fictional character from the G.I. Joe franchise

G.I. Joe
- G.I. Joe character
- General Colton from G.I. Joe: America's Elite
- First appearance: 1964 (as G.I. Joe), 1989 (as Gen. Joe Colton)

In-universe information
- Affiliation: G.I. Joe
- Specialty: Strategic and Tactical Operations
- File name: Colton, Joseph B.
- Birth place: Central Falls, Rhode Island
- SN: 1033-1027-HAS93 (1994); 103-31-HA27 (2006)
- Rank: O-2 (1st Lieutenant) (1964); O-10 (General) (1994)
- Primary MOS: G.I. Joe XO (Executive Officer)
- Secondary MOS: Combat Infantry (Training and Intelligence)

Joseph Colton, the original G.I. Joe, is a fictional character from G.I. Joe: A Real American Hero, a line of military-themed toys created by Hasbro. He also appeared as a character later in the comic book series, but did not appear in any of the animated series. He is portrayed by Bruce Willis in the film G.I. Joe: Retaliation.

== Profile ==
Joseph B. Colton graduated with the highest honors from the United States Military Academy at West Point in 1960. An expert marksman, he was recruited by Special Forces, and later became a Green Beret. During service overseas, he participated in numerous combat operations, but saw minimal acknowledgment, as his missions were "ultra" classified. In 1963, he was appointed by then-President John F. Kennedy to create and command an "ULTIMATE freedom fighting force." It was at this time that he received the code name G.I. Joe.

He later "retired" from active military duty, and was placed as the head of a secret Strategic Defense Initiative installation in New York City. There he served with the lead scientist, G.I. Jane, who originally maintained cover as a combat nurse.

== Toys ==
"G.I. Joe" was first released in 1994, as a mail-in exclusive for the 30th Anniversary of G.I. Joe. Based on the version of G.I. Joe from 1964, the figure was available in limited stock. Due to unanticipated orders, Hasbro sold out all of the figures and no more were produced, eventually leading Hasbro to mail an apology.

He was not released again until 2006, this time as part of a multi-figure pack, the Viper Lockdown. This version of the G.I. Joe was made up of parts from different figures, and is not a separate mold. Overall, he has had 2 releases using a total of 2 different molds.

He was also released in the 12 inch line in 1994, as an homage to his original figure released in 1964.

== Comics ==
=== Comic book advertisement (1975-1976) ===
Between 1975 and 1976, Hasbro published comic book advertisements starring the Adventure Team, featuring Joseph Colton, Atomic Man and Bulletman as members.

=== Marvel Comics ===
Cover of G.I. Joe: A Real American Hero #152.

General Joseph Colton made very few appearances during the original G.I. Joe: A Real American Hero series. In issue #86, he is working with his old colleague Jane on a secure level in the Chrysler Building (renamed as the Studebaker Building due to licensing issues). The laboratories are attacked by Cobra forces, which desire the orbital pulsed weapon system hidden inside. Joe, Jane, and a small squad of official G.I. Joe forces (including Repeater and Lightfoot) defeat the Cobra soldiers.

In issue #127, General Colton explains the Rapid Pulse Electron Beam (RPEB) to Duke and Stalker. He discovers a tap into the control system, leading to a telephone switching station in New Jersey, where Cobra Commander has taken charge. Realizing that their systems are breached, General Colton has Jane shut down all systems. General Colton, Duke, Stalker and Wild Bill then head to the phone switching station, but Cobra shoots down the Joes Tomahawk, and Cobra Commander escapes, rushing to New York City and the RPEB. General Colton, Stalker and Duke use Battle Copters to fly back to the Chrysler Building, but Cobra Commander has already taken control of the RPEB, and uses it to eliminate a drug shipment by Headman. Cobra Commander and his crew then use civilian disguises to walk undetected past the Joes.

General Colton also appears in issue #152, where he is called back to active duty for a secret mission. Ace is assigned to deliver Colton to D.C., and asks Colton when the last time he was in the back seat of a combat jet. This prompts Colton to reminisce about his earlier years in battle, leading to a flashback story about the original plan to form a G.I. Joe team.

=== Devil's Due Publishing ===
==== G.I. Joe: Frontline ====
The first four issues of Devil's Due Publishing's G.I. Joe: Frontline featured Larry Hama's story of one last mission, "The Mission That Never Was." After the official disbandment of the G.I. Joe team they hold one last mission. They had to transport the Rapid Pulse Particle Beam from Florida to Colton's location in New York City. During this series, Colton is stationed in the Strategic Defense Initiative (SDI).

==== Reinstatement ====
General Colton appears later in the series. He comes out of retirement to lead the G.I. Joe Team, after Hawk is paralyzed by Cobra Commander. His leadership is temporary, as he is quickly sidelined by the cabal of Generals known as the Jugglers who instead want General Philip Rey to lead the team.

Colton becomes a target when the Red Shadows began going after G.I. Joe and Cobra agents. He is shot and apparently killed by the Red Shadow's leader, Wilder Vaughn, a man Colton once knew. The injuries are critical, but Colton survives.

==== America's Elite ====
After a year of disbandment, General Colton is asked by the president to head a much smaller G.I. Joe team in the absence of Hawk. He is reluctant, but accepts the position, and leads the Joes from their new headquarters, a secret facility known as The Rock.

When Cobra takes control of M.A.R.S., and begins to sell weaponry to insurgents, terrorists, and rebel groups, General Colton goes on the offensive, mobilizing the entire G.I. Joe roster, and launching missions to capture Cobra agents still at large. During "World War III", General Colton leads a small unit in retaking Fort Meade. When the Joes attack Cobra's Appalachian base, General Colton is shot in the back by Cobra Commander, but again survives. At the end of the series, he is able to convince the president that G.I. Joe is still needed. With Hawk at his side, he leads a fully restored and recognized G.I. Joe team into battle.

=== Alternate realities and continuities ===
General Colton has made one appearance as a major character outside of the main G.I. Joe continuity.

==== G.I. Joe vs. the Transformers: Black Horizon (Vol. 4) ====
During this fourth miniseries, Hawk discovered G.I. Joe was being held captive by the forces of Cobra-La in the Himalayas. Along with his team, Joe was captured by the Decepticons in 1978. He later escaped to help Hawk and Optimus Prime defeat Cobra-La.

==== Hasbro Comic Book Universe (IDW Publishing) ====
In the Hasbro Comic Book Universe, Colton was a member of the Adventure Team, alongside Miles "Mayhem" Manheim, Mike "Atomic Man" Power, Richard "Bulletman" Ruby, and Lonzo "Stalker" Wilkinson. On their mission to the Tomb of Amtoltec, they battled an army of robotic mummies, before having an encounter with the Decepticon named Soundwave. By the end of the search, the Adventure Team retrieved an ancient artifact they codenamed the "Talisman".

After Megatron led the 2007 Decepticon invasion on Earth, Colton began fearing what the Transformers could do to humanity. In the meantime, he joined his fellow Joes in their final victory against Cobra. By the end, Colton's worldview is drastically changed after the treachery of Galvatron with the Earth Defense Command.

Prior to the Revolution event, Colton was replaced by a Dire Wraith who attempted to control the Earth Defense Command by excluding Marissa Faireborn and Spike Witwicky. He also made horrific experiments on Aaron Grundy (Axiom), a skilled computer programmer who would be transformed into a monster loyal to the Wraiths. But the impostor was later killed by Rom, whose death made G.I. Joe declare war against the Autobots, until they realized the truth about the Wraith infiltration.

Meanwhile, the real Colton is revealed to be alive, having cut off his right hand in order to escape from the Dire Wraith who replaced him. Convinced that the Transformers are in league with the Dire Wraiths and must be destroyed, Colton went on hiding and became the international criminal known as "Baron Ironblood", which made him cross paths with the Action Man Program. He has been secretly recruiting villains to form the Iron Ring and launch a first strike against Cybertron, setting the events of First Strike in motion.

As the Iron Ring attacked Cybertron, Colton sent Doctor Mindbender (disguised as Ironblood) as a decoy while he searched the planet's core in order to power the Talisman and destroy the Transformers. Inside the core, Colton and the Iron Ring are confronted by Scarlett and her comrades. At the battle's climax, Colton's closest ally, Garrison Kreiger, reveals his true identity as Merklynn (a wizard from the planet Prysmos) and explains that he has been using the Iron Ring's needs so he could use the Talisman to transform Cybertron and Earth into new versions of Prysmos. He then magically teleports everyone back to Cybertron's surface, where Colton sadly surrenders, having realised that he helped an even worst enemy to ensure Earth's incoming destruction, rather than saving it.

Colton was last seen in the Transformers: Unicron miniseries, where he reluctantly helps the Autobots to battle Unicron, who was awakened as side-effect by the same invasion he had caused on Cybertron.

== Live action film ==
General Joseph Colton
- G.I. Joe character
- First appearance: 2013
- Portrayed by: Bruce Willis

In-universe information
- Affiliation: G.I. Joe
- File name: Colton, Joseph B.
- Birth place: Central Falls, RI
- Rank: Major General (O-8)
- Series: G.I. Joe: Retaliation

General Colton is portrayed by Bruce Willis in G.I. Joe: Retaliation, the sequel to G.I. Joe: The Rise of Cobra. The movie was released on March 28, 2013, through collaboration of Paramount Pictures and Metro-Goldwyn-Mayer. In the film, General Colton has one of George S. Patton's M-1911 pistols. He is the reason why the G.I. Joes are called "Joes".

Colton was mentioned by Scarlett in Snake Eyes as the G. I. Joe's general and leader after she handed Snake Eyes a file on his father.
