= Transformers: King Grimlock =

American comic book limited series

- Cover A for issue #1.

Publication information
- Publisher: IDW Publishing (licensed by Hasbro)
- Format: Limited series
- Genre: Action; Fantasy; Science fiction
- Publication date: August 4, 2021 – February 2, 2022
- No. of issues: 5

Creative team
- Written by: Steve Orlando
- Penciller(s): Agustin Padilla
- Letterer(s): Jake M. Wood
- Colorist(s): Heather Breckel; Jeremy Colwell
- Editor(s): Riley Farmer; Assisting Editor: David Mariotte; Supervising Editor: Tom Waltz

Transformers: King Grimlock is an American comic book limited series written by Steve Orlando, drawn by Agustin Padilla, colored by Jeremy Colwell and Heather Breckel, and published by IDW Publishing. Based on the Transformers franchise by Hasbro and Takara-Tomy, the series features Grimlock as the main character.

The series debuted on August 4, 2021, and concluded on February 2, 2022.

== Premise ==
During a mission, Dinobot Grimlock is accidentally transported to the magical planet Menonia, but takes the opportunity to become the strongest. After meeting a human named Arko, Grimlock reluctantly joins forces with her to save her planet from a despot.

== Publication history ==
In May 2021, IDW Publishing announced a comic book limited series titled Transformers: King Grimlock, written Steve Orlando, drawn by Agustin Padilla, colored by Jeremy Colwell, and set to be published in August 2021.

Orlando said the series "is a sky-high dream come to life. This is a first-of-its-kind, science/fantasy epic for fans new and old, whether you follow the animation of the '80s, the modern shows of the '00s, the big-screen blockbusters, the decades of incredible comics, or if you've been intrigued by Grimlock action figures on the shelf. Everyone's welcome!"

IDW editor David Mariotte said, "by spotlighting a beloved character like Grimlock in an epic barbarian fantasy, Steve, Agustin, and Jeremy are crafting an iconic story that expands the understanding of who Grimlock is and what a Transformers story can be. Plus, a two-story tall robotic T-rex battles dragons, magicians, and monsters, which is awesome."

== Issues ==
Issue	Title	Written by	Drawn by	Colored by	Publication date
#1	"Grimlock the Rebel"	Steve Orlando	Agustin Padilla	Jeremy Colwell	August 4, 2021
In the city of Harmonex, while the Autobots fight for peace against the Mecannibals, Grimlock, the rebel leader of the Dinobots, gets magically transported to the planet Menonia, where he gracefully fights all kind of creatures until he meets Arnak, a wizard who intended to transport Optimus Prime instead of Grimlock, in order to save his planet from the Golden One, a hero turned despot. However, Grimlock refuses to help them, as he only wants to fight the Golden One to prove his own might. As Grimlock leaves them, Arnak's skeptical daughter, Arko, decides to follow him.
#2	"Grimlock the Defender"	Steve Orlando	Agustin Padilla	Jeremy Colwell	September 1, 2021
While Grimlock fights cyclopes sent by the Golden One, he is about to be eaten by a ridge worm, but he is saved by Arko by killing the creature. After a brief argument, they both reluctantly decide to help each other by travelling to Angloria, a fishing village, where they fight an army of wood-bots sent by the Red Wizard, a necromancer. When Grimlock prefers to fight the Red Wizard instead of the Golden One, Arko storms off. Meanwhile, the Golden One takes advantage of the situation.
#3	"Grimlock the Avenger"	Steve Orlando	Agustin Padilla	Jeremy Colwell	October 12, 2021
As Grimlock prepares the Anglorians to fight the Red Wizard's army, they fight armies of wood-bots and dirt soldiers. When Grimlock defeats the Red Wizard, he discovers the latter is in fact a Quintesson, and that Menonia's energon is the source of the Golden One's power. Still angered at Grimlock for his lack of honor, Arko sides with the Golden One.
#4	"Grimlock and the Sorcerer"	Steve Orlando	Agustin Padilla	Heather Breckel and Jeremy Colwell	December 1, 2021
While Grimlock finally steps on the Golden One's castle, he confronts Claata, his chief advisor, along his soldiers. Meanwhile, Arnak and Elder Nerea cause an eclipse on the sun, as part of Grimlock's plan to weaken the Golden One. Back in the Red Wizard's keep, Grimlock found out Soltron's energon is poisonous to any living being; it even took control of the Golden One as a vessel. Having realized the damage he did against his people, the Golden One expellees Soltron from his body, dying in the process. But Soltron then possesses Arko's body as his new vessel.
#5	"Grimlock the Triumphant"	Steve Orlando	Agustin Padilla	Jeremy Colwell	February 2, 2022
In the last fight, Grimlock offers himself to be possessed by Soltron, in exchange for freeing Arko. When that happens, Grimlock uses his spark to destroy Soltron's physical essence, erasing him for good. Grimlock then reawakens and reconciles with Arko, as he finally understands what how to use strength to protect. Arnak explains the spell he used on the sun caused his body to age, but he will still live for a few years. He also revealed that Soltron's death caused Menonia's energon to decrease, which would take years to make another portal to return to Harmonex. When Arnak asks Grimlock to lead the Memonians for the time being, the latter decides it is Arko who should take that position. Some time later, the citizens of Valerift found a way to summon a portal by using a sample of Grimlock's energon, which causes him to return to Cybetron while saying goodbye to Arko and the Menonians. Back on Harmonex, Grimlock reunites with the Dinobots, while he also makes peaces with Optimus for their previous ideological argument.

== Reception ==
Issue	Publication date	Critic rating	Critic reviews	Ref.
#1	August 4, 2021	7.6/10	6	
#2	September 1, 2021	7.7/10	2	
#3	October 12, 2021	6.0/10	1	
#4	December 1, 2021	—	—	
#5	February 2, 2022	5.0/10	1	
Overall		6.6/10	11	

== Collected edition ==
Title	Material collected	Pages	Publication date	ISBN
Transformers: King Grimlock	Transformers: King Grimlock #1–5	128	June 28, 2022	1684058996, 978-1684058990
