= M.A.S.K. (franchise) =

Media franchise constructed around action figures

M.A.S.K. (Mobile Armored Strike Kommand)
- Created by: Kenner
- Owner: Hasbro
- Years: 1985–present

Print publications
- Comics: M.A.S.K. (DC, Fleetway, IDW, Skybound)

Films and television
- Animated series: M.A.S.K. (1985–86)

Games
- Video game(s): M.A.S.K. I–III (Gremlin Graphics, 1987–88)

Miscellaneous
- Toys: Scale model cars Action figures

M.A.S.K. (acronym for "Mobile Armored Strike Kommand") is a media franchise created by Kenner. The main premise revolved around the fight between the titular protagonist underground task force and the terrorist organization V.E.N.O.M. (short for Vicious Evil Network Of Mayhem). After its initial launch in 1985, the franchise spawned a variety of products and presentations, including four series of action figures, an animated series, video games, and comics.

== History ==
M.A.S.K. was developed by Kenner in 1985, along with an animated television series to help with toy merchandising. The animated series debuted the same year and ran for two seasons (1985 to 1986). It focused mostly on toys released during the first two series of the toyline. From 1987 to 1988, Kenner released two additional series of action figures and vehicles, but these last two series strayed from the original theme of the series of crime-fighting and terrorism, focusing instead on a racing theme.

== Action figures ==
The original M.A.S.K. toyline from Kenner ran from 1985 to 1988, releasing four official series through those years. Each series featured vehicles with hidden gimmicks designed to represent combat-ready forms. Most vehicles came with one or two drivers, and each character had a mask that was depicted in fiction as having a certain special ability.

In 2024, The Loyal Subjects inked a deal with Hasbro to relaunch M.A.S.K. The first wave of products was released in July 2025.

== Television ==
=== Animated series (1985–1986) ===
Debuting in 1985, the animated series followed the original premise where M.A.S.K., a law enforcement task force led by Matt Trakker, fought against V.E.N.O.M., a criminal organization led by Miles Mayhem. The series was produced by DIC Entertainment. M.A.S.K ran in broadcast syndication on local TV stations across America for two seasons (from 1985 to 1986). In total, 75 episodes were aired.

=== Transformers: Prime continuity ===
In the animated series Transformers: Prime and Transformers: Robots in Disguise, M.A.S.K. is referred as a division of the United States military that developed a special vehicle (which they described as "experimental, all-terrain, expeditionary fighting"). Years later, several copies of that vehicle have been apparently mass-produced.

== Comics ==
M.A.S.K.-inspired comics have been published by Kenner, DC Comics, Grandreams, Fleetway Publications, Hasbro, IDW Publishing and Skybound Entertainment.

=== DC Comics (1986–1987) ===
The first M.A.S.K. comics were three mini-comics produced by Kenner that were packaged with the vehicles from the first series of toys in 1985. After the success of the franchise, DC Comics picked up the rights and produced a special insert which appeared in several comic books dated September and November 1985 to launch a four-issue miniseries (December 1985 – March 1986). This was soon followed by another insert in comics dated from June to November 1986 and a regular series that lasted nine issues (February–October 1987).

=== IDW Publishing (2016–2018) ===
M.A.S.K. was an American comic book series written by Brandon M. Easton, with art by Anthony Vargas and colors by Jordi Escuin Llorach, and was distributed between 2016 and 2017 by IDW Publishing, as part of the Hasbro Comic Book Universe.

In 2016, the franchise was reintroduced as part of IDW's Revolution crossover series. Matt Trakker is depicted as African-American in the series; Easton described the character as "an engineering genius and intellectual bad boy who has been in search of stability since the loss of his father at an early age". M.A.S.K. branched out into its own series starting in November but was canceled by IDW after only ten issues, with the final issue released in August 2017. The series garnered two 2017 Glyph Comics Awards: the "Fan Award for Best Comic" and "Best Male Character" for Matt Trakker.

Although the series was canceled, the characters from Brandon Easton's M.A.S.K. comic series returned later in 2017 as part of IDW's First Strike crossover series, featured in both a one-shot issue and a six-issue miniseries.

=== Skybound Entertainment (2026–present) ===
In 2025, Skybound Entertainment introduced M.A.S.K. into the Energon Universe. Matt Tracker (in the IDW version appearance) debuted in the G.I. Joe story of the 2025 Special, while Miles Mayhem debuted in Transformers #25. An ongoing M.A.S.K. series by Dan Watters and Pye Parr was released in 2026.

=== Other comics ===
A selection of the DC M.A.S.K. strips were reprinted in the UK, by Grandreams in Christmas annuals (1986 and 1987), which also featured original text stories.

M.A.S.K. was presented at the 2011 New York Comic Con by Hasbro in a convention-exclusive one-shot comic titled UNIT-E that featured various Hasbro licenses. Written by Andy Schmidt, M.A.S.K. was repackaged therein as a rogue quasi-law enforcement agency battling corruption in Detroit, led by Matt Trakker and four original team members, including a married couple.

== Other media ==
=== Video games ===
Screenshot from the Commodore 64 version of M.A.S.K. III: V.E.N.O.M. Strikes Back

Beginning in 1987, British software house Gremlin Graphics released a trilogy of computer games based on the franchise for various eight-bit computer formats.

The first game, M.A.S.K. I, was a vertically-viewed 2D game in which the player controls the Thunderhawk vehicle. The premise of the game is that V.E.N.O.M. have propelled Boulder Hill into a time vortex, and the player must rescue the other members of M.A.S.K. by collecting and re-assembling parts of a scan key, which then directs the player to the location of the missing personnel. The game received mostly favorable reviews at the time, although it was noted by some that the tie-in to the franchise was quite tenuous and only the graphics, rather than the storyline and gameplay, connected it to the franchise.

The second game, M.A.S.K. II, also released in 1987, was a 2D horizontal scrolling shoot-em-up. The game featured many more of the M.A.S.K. vehicles, and included a selection process in which the player chose which vehicles to use before the game began. Only one vehicle could be controlled at a time but these could be quickly interchanged. Again, the game was received favorably in the press, where it was noted that it was a better tie-in to the franchise than the first, because it featured more of the vehicles.

The final game in the trilogy, M.A.S.K. III – V.E.N.O.M. Strikes Back, another 2D horizontal shoot-em-up, was released in 1988. The premise of this final entry is that V.E.N.O.M. have kidnapped and are holding Scott Trakker on the moon. The player controls Matt Trakker (unrecognizable in a space suit with helmet) through a series of static screens featuring platform puzzles and obstacles which must be overcome using the powers of the various masks. The player can hold up to four masks at a time, but can only use the power of one at a time. The masks can also be exchanged at certain points in the game. This game received the best reviews of the trilogy, despite the deviation from the franchise's storyline and style.

All three game entries were released for the ZX Spectrum, Commodore 64 and Amstrad CPC formats, while the second and third games were also released for the MSX format.

=== Cancelled film ===
In 2015, Hasbro and Paramount were planning a cinematic universe combining M.A.S.K. with G.I. Joe, Micronauts, Visionaries: Knights of the Magical Light, and Rom. A writers' room was formed consisting of Michael Chabon, Brian K. Vaughan, Nicole Perlman, Cheo Hodari Coker, John Francis Daley, and others to develop storylines, with Akiva Goldsman overseeing the project, but it disbanded in 2017. The next year, F. Gary Gray was attached to direct a film adaptation, described as "a contemporary subculture movie with a youth empowerment angle". Chris Bremner was later hired to pen the script.

== See also ==
- List of M.A.S.K. toys and characters
