= Transformers '84: Secrets & Lies =

Comic book series

Publication information
- Publisher: IDW Publishing
- Format: Limited series
- Genre: Science fiction
- Publication date: July – October 2020
- No. of issues: 4 (plus issue #0)

Creative team
- Written by: Simon Furman
- Penciller(s): Guido Guidi
- Letterer(s): Tom B. Long
- Colorist(s): John-Paul Bove
- Editor(s): Riley Farmer; David Mariotte; Tom Waltz

Transformers '84: Secrets & Lies is an American comic book limited series written by Simon Furman, drawn by Guido Guidi and published by IDW Publishing. Based on the Transformers franchise by Hasbro, the series is meant to be a prequel to the continuity established on both the original comic book by Marvel Comics, and the alternate comic book by Marvel UK.

== Plot ==
During the ongoing Cybertronian Civil War between Optimus Prime's Autobots and Megatron's Decepticons, internal conflict emerges as Shockwave identifies Megatron himself as a hindrance to the Decepticons' ultimate goal of planetary domination. While Optimus Prime and his team of recruits embark on a mission to intercept a catastrophic asteroid belt capable of annihilating Cybertron, Megatron leads a group of Decepticons in pursuit. The mission, however, appears to serve purposes beyond planetary defense, potentially aligning with Shockwave's own agenda. The unfolding events are also linked to a mysterious secret connected to Earth in the eleventh century.

The story is narrated from the viewpoint of Punch a.k.a. Counterpunch, an Autobot infiltrating the Decepticons.

== Publication history ==
In 2019, IDW Publishing originally released the miniseries Transformers '84: Secrets & Lies miniseries written by veteran Transformers writer and co-creator Simon Furman, drawn by Guido Guidi and colored by John-Paul Bove.

The series a prequel to the original comic book series published by Marvel Comics, intended to fuse its continuity with the alternate Marvel UK series.

== Issues ==
Issue	Writer(s)	Artist(s)	Colorist(s)	Letterer(s)	Publication date
#0	Simon Furman	Guido Guidi	John-Paul Bove	Tom B. Long	August 21, 2019
#1	Simon Furman	Guido Guidi	John-Paul Bove	Tom B. Long	July 15, 2020
#2	Simon Furman	Guido Guidi	John-Paul Bove	Tom B. Long	August 19, 2020
#3	Simon Furman	Guido Guidi	John-Paul Bove	Tom B. Long	September 2, 2020
#4	Simon Furman	Guido Guidi	John-Paul Bove	Tom B. Long	October 28, 2020

== Reception ==
The initial issues received mostly positive reviews, with Ricky Church of Flickering Myth praising the writing and art, while Alexander Jones of Multiversity Comics says issue #0 is "a joyous exploration into the history of the Transformers." At ComicBook.com, Jamie Lovett wrote that as the series went on, it lost some of the charm it started with, feeling that it was a "love letter to the original Transformers comics" and "not meant to bring in new readers." Lovett gave high praise to the detailed artwork, which was true to the original comics.

Issue	Publication date	Rating	Reviews	Reference
#0	August 21, 2019	7.6/10	3	
#1	July 15, 2020	7.6/10	5	
#2	August 19, 2020	7.7/10	3	
#3	September 2, 2020	4.0/10	1	
#4	October 28, 2020	6.0/10	1	
Overall		6.6/10	13	

== Collected editions ==
Title	Material collected	Publication date	ISBN
Transformers '84: Secrets & Lies	Transformers '84 #0; Transformers '84: Secrets & Lies #1–4; Bonus material	February 17, 2021	1684057256, 978-1684057252
