= Alien Books =

American comic book publisher

- Status: Active
- Founded: 2024
- Country of origin: United States
- Headquarters location: New York City
- Official website: https://www.alienbooks.com/

Alien Books is an American comic book publisher and distributor founded in 2024 and based in New York City. The company features works from authors in the genres of science fiction, fantasy, horror and action.

== List of partners ==
- Valiant Comics (2024–present)
- IDW Publishing (2025–present)

== List of publications ==
=== Valiant Comics ===
- Bloodshot Unleashed (2024)
- Resurgence of the Valiant Universe (2024)
  - Bloodshot Unleashed: Reloaded
  - Britannia: The Great Fire of Rome
  - Livewire & the Secret Weapons
  - The Valiants
  - Faith Returns
  - Punk Mambo: The Punk Witch Project
  - X-O Manowar: Invictus
  - Rai: The Book of the Darque
  - Ninjak vs. Roku
  - Eternal Warriors: Last Ride of the Immortals
  - The Darques: Soulside
  - Archer & Armstrong: Assassin Nation
  - Shadowman: Soul Eaters
- Black, White & Bloodshot (2025)
- Valiant Beyond (2025)
  - Valiant Beyond: Bloodshot
  - Valiant Beyond: Tales of the Shadowman
  - Valiant Beyond: The X-O Manowar
  - Valiant Beyond: All-New Harbinger
- Valiant Zombies: Resurrection (2025)

=== Other ===
- Damaged People
- Gangrene
- I, Dragon
- Kinryo Rock — Code: Amrita
- Lord of the Dragons
  - Faires & Dragons
  - The Book of the Dragons
- Machine Girl and the Apace Hell's Angels
- Nexus: Scourge
- Zero Point
