= Inhumanoids =

1986 TV series and toyline

- Logo image from title sequence
- Genre: Action; Kaiju; Science fiction
- Created by: Flint Dille
- Written by: Larry Parr
- Directed by: Ray Lee
- Starring: Michael Bell; William Callaway; Ed Gilbert; Chris Latta; Neil Ross; Richard Sanders; Susan Silo
- Composer: Robert J. Walsh
- Countries of origin: United States; Japan
- No. of episodes: 13

Production
- Executive producers: Joe Bacall; Tom Griffin; Margaret Loesch; Lee Gunther
- Producer: Stephanie Burt
- Running time: 24 minutes
- Production companies: Hasbro; Sunbow Productions; Marvel Productions; Toei Animation

Original release
- Network: Syndication
- Release: June 29, 1986 - September 14, 1986 (Super Sunday)
- Release: September 21 – December 14, 1986 (TV series)

Inhumanoids is the title of an animated series and the name of a Hasbro toy property that were both released in 1986. In the tradition of other Hasbro properties such as Transformers and G.I. Joe, the show was produced by Sunbow Entertainment and Marvel Productions and animated in Japan by Toei Animation. Inhumanoids tells the story of the scientist-hero group, Earth Corps, as they battle a trio of subterranean monsters called the Inhumanoids with the aid of elemental beings, the Mutores.

== Inhumanoids: The Movie ==
The Inhumanoids series did not begin as a conventional 22-minute cartoon, but rather as a slate of six-to-seven-minute shorts that aired as part of the collective Super Sunday half-hour block alongside other Marvel/Sunbow series, Jem and the Holograms, Bigfoot and the Muscle Machines and Robotix. Although Bigfoot had only nine episodes, the other shows ran to 15 episodes, telling a complete story across their numerous installments, which were later edited together to form "movies" that were released on video. Out of the four, Jem proved to be the most popular, and was eventually made into an ongoing series that lasted for 65 episodes.

=== Summary ===
The story begins with the discovery of a monstrous creature encased in an amber monolith buried in Big Sur national park, that is recovered by Earth Corps, a government-funded geological sciences research team. The finding spurs Blackthorne Shore, a corrupt industrialist, to clandestinely uncover and release a second monster buried elsewhere—a giant vine-like creature called Tendril, who attacks the amber block's public unveiling in San Francisco to release the macabre colossus trapped within, D'Compose. They rampage through city streets before fleeing into the watery darkness of the bay. The Earth Corps member code-named Liquidator returns to Big Sur in search of further clues to the origin of these monsters, whereupon he discovers a race of sentient tree-beings, the Redwoods, who explain that they are part of a race of subterranean creatures known as Mutores and that their kind sealed the evil Inhumanoids Tendril and D'Compose beneath the Earth ages ago.

The malevolent Inhumanoid leader, Metlar, remains imprisoned below the surface, paralyzed by the magnetic field of a Mutore duo named Magnokor. A nocturnal assault by Tendril demolishes the Earth Corps base, prompting a chase into the depths of the Earth, but even with the help of another Mutore species, the rock-bodied Granites, they are forced to retreat to the surface. When their budget is summarily cut by Senator Masterson, a crooked politician in Blackthorne Shore's shady pocket, they are approached by Sandra Shore, Blackthorne's sister, who has learned of her brother's sinister plot to liberate Metlar. Funded by Sandra, the team constructs new vehicles and embarks back below the Earth's surface, tracking D'Compose and Tendril to the city of the Granites, where an ensuing battle frees Metlar from Magnokor's hold. Having pilfered the Earth Corps's engineering schematics via his ties to Masterson, Blackthorne joins the fray, now equipped with his own battle suit whose magnetic powers he wields against Metlar, only to be derailed by Tendril's interference while Sandra falls victim to the mutative touch of D'Compose.

Earth Corps manages to escape and forms an alliance with the Granites. Herc accompanies them to D'Compose's domain of Skellweb while Auger and Liquidator venture into Metlar's kingdom of Infernac and Bright convinces the Redwoods to help defend the surface world against attempts by the Inhumanoids to acquire sources of power. Herc and the Granites are able to defeat D'Compose's reanimated soldiers and restore Sandra to normal. Blackthorne pursues Auger and Liquidator to Infernac and tries to use his magnetic powers on Metlar once again but is foiled by Magnokor and taken captive by Metlar. Acting on information forced from Blackthorne, the Inhumanoids raid a Soviet airbase, stealing a handful of nuclear missiles. A seemingly repentant Blackthorne warns Earth Corps that the missiles are intended to shatter the divide between the Earth's crust and mantle, but upon traveling into the Earth to preclude this catastrophe, the team discovers that Blackthorne has set them up and that the missiles are actually meant to detonate the planet's core.

Earth Corps is able to convince D'Compose to allow them access to Infernac—a deal made easier by the fact that the Inhumanoid already fears for his survival in the face of Metlar's insane plan—and they manage to defuse enough of the missiles to thwart the explosive scheme. Following a climactic battle, D'Compose is re-sealed in amber casing, and Tendril is imprisoned by the Granites. Finally, Magnokor succeeds in neutralizing Metlar even as Blackthorne is arrested by Earth Corps. Senator Masterson provides the Earth Corps team with a new headquarters facility, but a tissue sample secured from Tendril during their first encounter with the monster has mysteriously gone missing.

== The series ==
Inhumanoids and Jem surpassed their fellow "Super Sunday" offerings by going on to be expanded into independent full-length shows. Jem achieved the greater success, eventually running to 65 episodes spanning several seasons, while Inhumanoids lasted only one season. In both cases, to begin the series, the introductory "movies" were cut into five separate 22-minute episodes composed of three shorts one piece. Inhumanoids was thereafter offered the series subtitle, The Evil That Lies Within, which was a phrase included in the lyrics of the intro of the show in every episode. Eight following 22-minute episodes were then produced to yield the usual 13-episode TV season. The series proved strange among children's cartoons of its time by the strong narrative flow that linked episodes in sequence with continuing storylines and subplots' suspenseful threading. Visually, the show was distinctive for its application of heavy shadow, use of split screens, and occasionally brow-raising for its graphic content, such as monstrous amputations or writhing deaths by toxic waste, which promised to be hard-pressed to sneak their way into contemporary "children's hour" programming.

=== Episodes ===
No.	Title	Written by	Original release date
1	"The Evil That Lies Within, Part 1"	Flint Dille	September 21, 1986
2	"The Evil That Lies Within, Part 2"	Flint Dille	September 28, 1986
3	"The Evil That Lies Within, Part 3"	Flint Dille	October 5, 1986
4	"The Evil That Lies Within, Part 4"	Flint Dille	October 12, 1986
5	"The Evil That Lies Within, Part 5"	Flint Dille	October 19, 1986
6	"Cypheroid"	Flint Dille	October 26, 1986
The tissue sample previously taken from Tendril grows into a second Tendril monster but is contained soon enough thanks to Earth Corps. The creature is then seized by Senator Masterson, who orders it placed in captivity to be studied by an advanced supercomputer, Cypher. The computer ends up freeing the Inhumanoid instead, exhibiting its own acquired sentience, soon rebuilding itself into the improved Cypheroid using technology stolen from Earth Corps. The rogue A.I. then directs Tendril to free Metlar. It also arranges for Blackthorne Shore to be released from prison along with his cellmate, the diabolical Dr. Herman Manglar, who has the fatal misfortune of encountering a pool of haphazardly discarded toxic waste during their swampy escape. The pursuit takes Earth Corps underground where the Cypheroid is ultimately destroyed, but Metlar remains at large, almost annihilating Earth Corps if not for the meddling of Blackthorne.
7	"The Surma Plan"	Flint Dille	November 2, 1986
Blackthorne escapes Metlar's punishment and acquires Dr. Manglar's toxic-rotted remains, employing D'Compose to resurrect him into a skeletal grotesquerie dubbed "Nightcrawler". Elsewhere, the Earth Corps team defeats the second Tendril creature, but the original manages to escape. Amid these events, Soviet forces initiate Operation: Surma, planning to flood Infernac to destroy the "primal core" in a massive explosion that will wipe out all Inhumanoids, but the Soviets fail to realize that their plan will likely tear the planet itself asunder in the process. Earth Corps is forced to ally themselves with Metlar to protect the welfare of the planet. When Metlar double-crosses them, the team is saved by a turncoat Soviet military agent, Anatoly Kiev, who they gratefully welcome into their ranks. Kiev respectfully declines, thinking that it is better to independently continue on his quest against Infernac.
8	"Cult of Darkness"	Flint Dille and Larry Parr (story), Buzz Dixon (teleplay)	November 9, 1986
Looking to land a spicy news scoop, investigative reporter Hector Ramirez infiltrates the underground compound of a growing cult movement that has become popular among San Francisco's disaffected teens. They find more than they bargained for when the gathering turns out to be a recruiting scheme fronted by Blackthorne Shore on behalf of the Inhumanoids. D'Compose uses his powers of decay to transform the teenage crowd into rampaging zombies who proceed to terrorize the city. It is up to Earth Corps to save the zombified kids without harming them, but in their decayed marauder state, the teens are proving less than cooperative, and the would-be rescue mission goes further afoul when Herc and Auger are "d'composed" themselves. The rest of the Earth Corps, however, rally back and restore Herc, Auger, and the teenagers.
9	"Negative Polarity"	Flint Dille; Richard Merwin	November 16, 1986
Tank (Kiev) teams up with Crygen and Pyre to harness the power of a boulder of galvacite, which will make them strong enough to vanquish Metlar once and for all. When they storm Infernac, their enhanced magnetic powers run amok, inducing a reversal of the core's polarity that renders Crygen and Pyre evil while changing Metlar's personality to good. The incident further initiates a chain reaction that threatens to pull Earth's deadly Van Allen radiation belt down to the surface of the planet. Much to his disgust, the now-altruistic Metlar brings himself to work in concert with Earth Corps to restore the natural order: they manage to reform the galvacite boulder, returning Crygen and Pyre to normal as Metlar reverts to evil and reclaims Infernac. Blackthorne and Nightcrawler unearth a cyclopean monstrosity with an insatiable appetite, the mindless Inhumanoid beast called Gagoyle, from its nesting chamber within the cavernous bowels of a radioactive volcano.
10	"The Evil Eye"	Flint Dille	November 23, 1986
Betrayed by Nightcrawler's subsequent manipulations of the monstrous one-eyed Gagoyle, Blackthorne flees the scene, vowing to take revenge by releasing the most evil Inhumanoid of all, whichever one that proves to be. Nightcrawler shortly pays a visit to Skellweb, setting Gagoyle to attack Metlar's realm, although without much success. Meanwhile, a former research associate from Blackthorne Shore's earlier years in archaeological study contacts Earth Corps to convey a disturbing tale regarding Shore's interest in an ancient temple located somewhere on the isle of Borneo, but Blackthorne is already one step ahead of the group and manages to intercept their venture, hijacking their plane before parachuting down into the jungle. New Earth Corps member Sabre Jet (Air Force pilot Brad Armbruster) makes his first appearance as the plane's pilot after arriving in his vintage P-51. Sometime later Blackthorne Shore arrives at a gruesome temple, within which a snake-like Inhumanoid named Sslither has been imprisoned for thousands of years. Blackthrone frees the creature to carry out his bidding.
11	"Primal Passions"	Flint Dille	November 30, 1986
Near Angkor Wat in Cambodia, Sslither zaps an F-5 jet flown by Sabre Jet out of the sky while he is leading a squadron searching for Blackthorne; the crash puts him in the hospital. Later, during an expedition to the Earth's mantle, the other members of the Earth Corps are ambushed in a trap set by the Inhumanoids. In the ensuing scuffle, a miscalculation in Liquidator's chemical spray formula sends the Inhumanoids on a mad, amorous spree: D'Compose professes his undying love for an undead Sandra Shore, Tendril tries to romance a robotic movie prop, while a starry-eyed Metlar steals away to his molten abode with the Statue of Liberty in his misbegotten embrace.
12	"The Masterson Team"	Flint Dille; Richard Merwin	December 7, 1986
In a reckless PR stunt, Senator Masterson and tabloid-TV journalist Hector Remirez, together with a menagerie of inept celebrity goons, mount a live televised "journey to the center of the Earth" aboard a fleet of dirigible vehicles, promising to rescue the Statue of Liberty from Metlar's abduction. Auger and company are content to let the inevitable televised chaos unfold, and instead busy themselves with the marriage of their teammate, Derek Bright, to actress Stella Blaze, a fiery redhead recently rescued from the adoring clutches of Tendril, who also decides to crash the wedding. From his hospital bed, recovering Sabre Jet recounts how his plane was downed by the serpentine monster, Sslither, in the skies over Angkor Wat. Earth Corps consult the Redwoods for more information, learning the dark history of Sslither's dominion over the Inhumanoids before Metlar finally rebelled, managing to trap his slithery overlord within a shell of lava. Meanwhile, Masterson's subterranean team finds themselves in over their heads, first being captured by stone warriors, then being made hostage to Blackthorne's ambitions. Earth Corps forms a reluctant alliance with Nightcrawler to combat the threat of Sslither and rescue Masterson's group just as Metlar arrives to pummel his hated ancient foe, who slithers away in defeat. Lady Liberty is later returned to the surface by Metlar's own accord when he finds himself less than enamored by her incessant nagging.
13	"Auger... for President?"	Flint Dille	December 14, 1986
Three months have passed since the last Inhumanoid attack. Derek and Stella Bright are enjoying their newlywed status as a celebrity couple even as the other members of Earth Corps increasingly find themselves basking in the media spotlight, except Auger, who seems to have been overlooked by fortune's calling. Senator Masterson's declared candidacy for the presidential race is met by a hostile public reception, prompting Blackthorne and the Inhumanoids to conspire to use intimidation tactics to terrify the other presidential contenders into withdrawing. In reaction, Auger decides to enter the race himself, challenging Masterson's undeserving political record. The Inhumanoids try to bolster Masterson's credibility with a staging of faux heroics, but when Auger wins the election regardless, he is immediately kidnapped by the enraged Inhumanoids, who invite all opponents to attempt a rescue in a final grand confrontation. Earth Corps and a battalion dubbed Delta Force motor to Skellweb, fighting their way through a phalanx of skeletal warriors and dispensing with Langastoid mercenaries while the Redwood army overwhelms Tendril, and Granite warriors flatten Metlar's statue legion. D'Compose makes a quick exit as the Mutores and Earth defense forces finally advance to face Metlar's molten fury. Magnokor is able to magnetically subdue him until Blackthorne intrudes with a delay that imperils Auger's life. Luckily, Tank and Sabre Jet arrive at the eleventh hour to save the day. In light of their triumph, Auger and the Earth Corps team renew their pledge to remain together to guard against danger from the Inhumanoids.

== Characters ==
=== The Earth Corps ===
- Dr. Herman "Herc" Armstrong, codename 'Hooker', is the leader of Earth Corps, decisive and outspoken. His exosuit sports a powerful grappling hook mounted in an arm gauntlet, which he uses to scale vertical extremes in his spelunking adventures. He was voiced by Neil Ross.
- Dr. Derek Ericson Bright, codename 'Digger', is the maverick engineer responsible for designing Earth Corps' vehicles and other high-tech equipment. He was voiced by Richard Sanders.
- Dr. Edward "The Fist" Augutter, codename 'Auger', is the bald member of the team, a distinguished archaeologist and Earth Corps' resident mechanic, constructing the team's protective exosuits and weaponry. He was voiced by Michael Bell.
- Mr. Marcus Capello, codename 'Captain Action', is a master Policeman. He was voiced by John Aniston.
- Dr. Johnathon Martin Slattery, codename 'Liquidator', is a master chemist. He was voiced by William Callaway.
- Sandra Shore, codename 'Ms. Navigator', the only female Earth Corps member. She was voiced by Susan Silo.
- Colonel Anatoly Kiev, codename 'Tankmaster' is a veteran member of the Soviet army and world-famous chess master. He was voiced by Neil Ross.
- Bradley Joseph Armbruster, codename 'Sabre Jet', is a pilot in the U.S. Air Force. He was voiced by Neil Ross in this series.

=== Inhumanoids ===
- Metlar, the leader of the Inhumanoids
- D'Compose, a gigantic undead monster
- Tendril, a plant monster

== Cast ==
- Charles Adler - George Landisburg ("Primal Passions")
- Michael Bell - Auger, Blackthorne Shore
- William Callaway - Jonathan M. Slattery/Liquidator, Nightcrawler/Dr. Herman Manglar (from "Cypheroid" to "Cult of Darkness")
- Fred Collins - General Kursakov
- Brad Crandel - Narrator
- Ron Feinberg - Nightcrawler (from "Negative Polarity" onwards)
- Dick Gautier - Magnakor/Pyre/Crygen, Senator Masterson ("Cypheroid"), George Landisburg ("The Masterson Team" and "Auger... For President?")
- Ed Gilbert - Metlar, Senator Masterson
- Chris Latta - D'Compose, Tendril, Granahue
- Neil Ross - Herc Armstrong, Tank, Ssslither, Sabre Jet, Hector Ramirez
- Richard Sanders - Derek Bright
- Stanley Ralph Ross - Redlen, Redsun, Joe Abdullah
- Susan Silo - Sandra Shore, Stella Blaze, Statue of Liberty, Female Statue Warriors, Barbara Walker
- John Stephenson - Granok, General Granitary

== Action figures ==
A series of action figures based on the cartoon was produced by Hasbro and designed by David McDonald (now VP of Product Development/Design at Spin Master LTD) in 1986. The scientist figures each had an action power and all figures had "glow in the light" features. The original series of Mutors had a variety of toy figures: Redlen (dark redwood), Redsun (light redwood), Redwood Race (grey redwood), Granok (grey granite), and Granite Race (beige granite). A second series of Inhumanoids figures was in the works at the time of the line's cancellation. The only character which was confirmed to reach the prototype stage by an ex-Hasbro employee was Sslither (the word "Slither" with a double S, although the animated designs of Tank, Sabre Jet, Nightcrawler, and Blackthorne's second suit all strongly indicate that they were adapted from intended toys).

== Comic books ==
Cover to issue #1 of The Inhumanoids comic series published by Marvel Comics, January 1987

=== Marvel Comics (1987) ===
Marvel Comics produced a short-lived Inhumanoids comic book under its Star Comics imprint in 1987, adapting the storyline of "The Evil That Lies Within". The series ended after only four issues and left readers with the cliffhanger of Metlar's escape from captivity and Sandra Shore's transformation into an undead minion of D'Compose. Within the Marvel Comics multiverse, the Inhumanoids reality is designated as Earth-87119.

=== 2009 cancelled series ===
In 2009, Kevin Smith was rumored to be writing a reboot for the Inhumanoids comic series, with George Pratt doing art, but Smith later confirmed via Facebook that he was not writing a comic book despite his interest in doing so.

=== IDW Publishing (2020) ===
The 2020 miniseries Rom: Dire Wraiths by IDW Publishing set in the Hasbro Comic Book Universe features characters and references to Inhumanoids; for example, the Earth Corps are renamed as the Adventure-One Team.
