= The Transformers: Last Stand of the Wreckers =

The Transformers: Last Stand of the Wreckers is a mini-series from IDW Publishing's The Transformers, centering on the Autobot team known as the Wreckers.
