= The Transformers: Maximum Dinobots =

Comic book limited series

Publication information
- Publisher: IDW Publishing
- Format: Limited series
- Genre: Science fiction
- Publication date: December 2008 – April 2009
- No. of issues: 5
- Main character(s): Dinobots

Creative team
- Written by: Simon Furman
- Artist(s): Nick Roche

The Transformers: Maximum Dinobots was a story arc from IDW Publishing's The Transformers, and followed The Transformers: All Hail Megatron.

== Plot summary ==
No.	Title	Release date	ISBN
01	The Transformers: Maximum Dinobots #1	December 10th, 2008	—
Artist: Nick Roche; Trapped and alone on Earth, Grimlock assesses the situation: his ship, the Skyfire, is buried in the Franz Josef Glacier in New Zealand, he is being hunted by both Ultra Magnus and Scorponok, and the Decepticons are about to conquer the planet. To make matters worse, the secret human organization Skywatch has mentally enslaved the other Dynobots, unaware that Abraham Dante's criminal organization, the Machination, is planning to usurp control of the Autobot super-warriors and has already crafted a Headmaster army cloned from Sunstreaker. While the real Sunstreaker and his Headmaster partner Hunter O'Nion continue searching for his real head, the Machination Headmasters find Grimlock and teleport him into the middle of Fallon, Nevada. As Skywatch prepares to send out the Dynobots to capture Grimlock, Dante (himself a Headmaster partner) fuses with Scorponok to destroy Hot Rod.
02	The Transformers: Maximum Dinobots #2	January 7th, 2009	—
Artist: Nick Roche; Scorponok dispatches Hot Rod before bringing him to observe the situation in Fallon; Grimlock attempts to provoke Scorponok into a fight but is met instead by the Dynobots. Sunstreaker and Hunter locate the head in Dallas, Texas, while Skywatch blocks police intervention in the fight and realizes that their control over the Dynobots is slipping. Grimlock easily dispatches Snarl, Swoop, and Sludge, but accidentally blows up a gas station while fighting Slag; Scorponok uses the momentary pause in battle to explain his plan to Hot Rod, in which Grimlock, the Dynobots, and Skywatch will all destroy each other, leaving the Machination and the Headmasters as the primary powers on Earth. Scorponok frees the other Dynobots from the mind control, and they berate their former leader Grimlock for entombing them on prehistoric Earth. As Scorponok sends in the Headmasters to dispose of them, Skywatch decides to make a deal with the final Transformer in their captivity: Shockwave.
03	The Transformers: Maximum Dinobots #3	February 18th, 2009	—
Artist: Nick Roche; Shockwave is reactivated by Skywatch and learns that the humans have placed a bomb inside his head that will explode in 24 hours: the cyclopean Decepticon agrees to retrieve the Dynobots, Ravage, and Laserbeak in exchange for his freedom and the bomb's deactivation code. Grimlock attempts to unify the Dynobots but is forced to take on the Headmaster army alone when they refuse to trust him again. Hot Rod incites Scorponok's wrath with his unfazed reaction to the latter's grand scheme, and Sludge inspires the other Dynobots to help Grimlock; the group is overwhelmed by hundreds of Headmasters while Hunter infiltrates the Machination headquarters in Dallas. The Monsterbots unexpectedly arrive to help Grimlock and the two groups of misfit Autobots rout the Headmasters; a furious Scorponok orders the mocking Hot Rod executed, but he kills his Headmaster guards and attempts to escape, while Shockwave tracks down the reason behind Ravage and Laserbeak's disappearance: Soundwave, trapped in his alternate tape deck form.
04	The Transformers: Maximum Dinobots #4	April 1, 2009	—
Artist: Nick Roche; As Ravage and Laserbeak rescue the weakened Soundwave and bring him to Mount St. Helens, Shockwave appears and offers a proposition to the three, as Hot Rod encounters the real Sunstreaker while fleeing from more Headmaster clones. The Monsterbots grow restless as Grimlock manages to extend their temporary alliance – granting them access to Shockwave's personal database in exchange for fixing the Skyfire – but incites the wrath of the Dynobots again for leaving them out of the loop. Hot Rod manages to send out a distress signal while Scorponok foils Sunstreaker's attempt to steal his original head back. Although the Dynobots question Grimlock's loyalty towards them, they decide to help him take down Scorponok as Hunter tearfully deactivates Sunstreaker's head. The Sunstreaker clones shut down, but a furious Scorponok kills Sludge and attacks Grimlock, only to be stopped by Shockwave. Meanwhile, Ultra Magnus receives Hot Rod's signal and begins heading towards Earth.
05	The Transformers: Maximum Dinobots #5	April 1, 2009	—
Artist: Nick Roche; Grimlock mourns Sludge's death even as Scorponok and Shockwave fight around him for the honor of killing Hot Rod and the Dynobots. Snarl, Slag, and Swoop retreat to the Monsterbots' ship as Hot Rod and Grimlock continue watching the fight and Skywatch reacquires Ravage and Laserbeak; they also decide to allow the bomb in Shockwave's head to explode regardless of the battle's victor. The fear from the Headmaster Dante clouds Scorponok's systems just enough for Shockwave to win the fight, but he allows Scorponok to escape. Shockwave sets his sights on Grimlock as the bomb's timer reaches 12 minutes before detonation, but Skywatch is unaware that Soundwave is working to decrypt the disarm code in exchange for being released from his alternate mode. Sludge recovers as the other Dynobots return to help Grimlock; they leave to find Scorponok as Soundwave disarms the bomb in Shockwave's head. Grimlock incapacitates both himself and Shockwave as the Dynobots save Hot Rod and Hunter from Scorponok; Ultra Magnus appears, arrests Grimlock, Shockwave, and Scorponok's remains, and suggests that everyone else should destroy the Machination facility and leave. Ratchet heals both Hunter and Sunstreaker as Grimlock accepts his imprisonment, content that the other Dynobots have been allowed to go free.

Reviews

Issue #1 ComicList Review: 4/5
Issue #2 ComicList Review: 4/5
Issue #3 Panels on Pages Review: 3/5
Issue #4 ComicList Review: 3/5
Issue #5 ComicList Review: 4/5
