= Revolution (IDW Publishing) =

Comic book series

- Official teaser drawn by Fico Ossio and Diego Rodriguez

Publication information
- Publisher: IDW Publishing (licensed by Hasbro)
- Schedule: Bi-weekly
- Format: Limited series
- Genre: Science fiction
- Publication date: May 2 – December 8, 2016
- No. of issues: 5, plus a 0 issue
- Main character: Hasbro Comic Book Universe

Creative team
- Written by: John Barber; Cullen Bunn
- Artist: Fico Ossio
- Colorist: Sebastian Cheng

Collected editions
- January 19, 2017: ISBN 163140816X
- February 9, 2017: ISBN 1631408410
- February 16, 2017: ISBN 1631408429
- May 2017: ISBN 978-1-63140-937-0

Revolution is a 2016 comic book storyline published by IDW Publishing, that ran from September to November 2016. The story involves characters from various Hasbro franchises.

== Plot ==
=== Main story ===
Several months after Optimus Prime's controversial annexation of Earth into the Cybertronian Council of Worlds, the political situation remains volatile as humanity struggles to come to terms with the actions of the Transformers, viewing them with distrust. The tensions heighten after Earth's deposits of Ore-13 start to rapidly destabilize, threatening the planet with nuclear annihilation.

Believing the Autobots to be responsible, the President of the United States makes the decision to reactivate America's highly trained special mission force G.I. Joe to counterattack. Unbeknownst to the government, G.I. Joe's ranks have been infiltrated by an entirely different race of alien shapeshifters: the evil wizards known as Dire Wraiths – also drawn to Earth's supplies of Ore-13 – in a conspiracy that spreads all the way up to Joe Colton himself. The Wraith masquerading as Colton contacts his old Adventure Team friend Miles Manheim, hoping to reverse-engineer captured Cybertronian assets into a mechanical strike force in order to fight back. Manheim, however, has cut a deal with the extradimensional conqueror known as Baron Karza - in exchange for Earth's deposits of Ore-13 to save Karza's dimension from a destructive entropy storm, Manheim will receive dominion over Earth.

When the Autobot base Metrotitan abruptly goes silent, Optimus Prime calls Windblade to Earth in the hopes of using her cityspeaking skills to diagnose the problem. Before long, however, Prime and his allies are dispatched to Portland when Joe Colton takes the fight to Transformers. The battle is interrupted by Rom the Space Knight, who annihilates the Wraiths within the ranks of the Joes and forces the Autobots to pursue the alien. Meanwhile, Kup and Aileron discover the true problem with Ore-13, but are ambushed by M.A.S.K., with Miles Mayhem taking Kup prisoner.

Optimus and Rom reach an understanding and the Space Knight accompanies them back to Metrotitan, just as Windblade returns from a mental voyage into Microspace, where she encountered its progenitor Micronus Prime. Her desire to save this dying dimension runs up against Optimus Prime's orders to protect Earth first, but Rom's recklessness prompts Prime to realize that both Earth and Microspace must be saved; meanwhile, in Microspace, the adventurous Micronauts head into the fray as part of a deal with Baron Karza.

Meanwhile, the restless Decepticon Thundercracker finds himself protecting the President and her entourage from a team of Dire Wraiths. The extraterrestrial activity on Earth prompts the attention of the UK-based Action Man Programme, prompting them to deploy their top agent, Ian Noble, to retrieve Kup from beneath Governor's Island. Ian and Kup form a friendship as they return to Monument Valley, now under siege by the combined forces of M.A.S.K. and the Dire Wraiths.

As the battle intensifies, Baron Karza finally reveals himself as the perpetrator behind it all. Being enhanced by the Ore-13, Karza fuses with Wraith magic and M.A.S.K. technology to transform himself into a colossal monster. The arrival of G.I. Joe turns the advantage towards the Autobots and their allies; with the help of the Micronauts and repentant M.A.S.K. pilot Matt Trakker, they succeed in forcing Karza back into his dimension, ending the threat to Earth.

=== Subplot ===
A side story focuses on the adventures of the Scavengers as they head to Earth so that Crankcase can go on a date with a friendly Dire Wraith he met online.

== Aftermath ==
The aftermath of Revolution marks the beginning of the Hasbro Reconstruction initiative, converging the stories featured in the Transformers and G.I. Joe comic books, with the addition of new comic books based on Micronauts, Rom, Action Man, and M.A.S.K.: Mobile Armored Strike Kommand within the Hasbro Comic Book Universe.

== Titles involved ==
=== "The Road to Revolution" ===
Chapter	Title / Issue	Writer(s)	Artist(s)	Publication date
1	Action Man #2	John Barber	Paolo Villanelli	July 2016
2	Micronauts #4	Cullen Bunn	David Baldeon	July 2016
3	Rom #1	Chris Ryall; Christos N. Gage	David Messina; Paolo Villainelli	July 2016
4	Transformers: Till All Are One #2	Mairghread Scott	Sara Pitre-Durocher	July 2016
5	Action Man #3	John Barber	Paolo Villanelli	August 2016
6	Micronauts #5	Cullen Bunn	David Baldeon	August 2016
7	Rom #2	Chris Ryall; Christos N. Gage	David Messina; Paolo Villainelli	August 2016
8	Transformers #56	John Barber	Andrew Griffith	August 2016
9	Transformers: More than Meets the Eye #56	James Roberts	Nick Roche	August 2016
10	Transformers: Till All Are One #3	Mairghread Scott	Sara Pitre-Durocher	August 2016
11	Action Man #4	John Barber	Andrew Griffith	September 2016
12	Micronauts #6	Cullen Bunn	David Baldeon	September 2016
13	Rom #3	Chris Ryall; Christos N. Gage	David Messina; Paolo Villainelli	September 2016
14	Transformers #57	John Barber	Andrew Griffith	September 2016
15	Transformers: More than Meets the Eye #57	James Roberts	Nick Roche	September 2016
16	Transformers: Till All Are One #4	Mairghread Scott	Sara Pitre-Durocher	September 2016
17	Rom #4	Chris Ryall; Christos N. Gage	David Messina; Paolo Villainelli	October 2016

=== Main issues ===
Chapter	Title / Issue	Writer(s)	Artist(s)	Publication date
1	Revolution Prelude	John Barber; Cullen Bunn	Fico Ossio	September 2016
2	Revolution #1	John Barber; Cullen Bunn	Fico Ossio	September 2016
3	Rom: Revolution	Christos Gage; Chris Ryall	Ron Joseph; Ashley Wood	September 2016
4	Revolution #2	John Barber; Cullen Bunn	Fico Ossio	September 2016
5	M.A.S.K.: Mobile Armored Strike Kommand: Revolution	Brandon M. Easton	Anthony Vargas	September 2016
6	Micronauts: Revolution	Cullen Bunn	Chris Panda	September 2016
7	Revolution #3	John Barber; Cullen Bunn	Fico Ossio	October 2016
8	G.I. Joe: Revolution	Aubrey Sitterson	Aaron Conley; Giannis Milonogiannis	October 2016
9	Transformers: Till All Are One: Revolution	Mairghread Scott	Sara Pitre-Durocher	October 2016
10	Revolution #4	John Barber; Cullen Bunn	Fico Ossio	October 2016
11	Transformers: Revolution	John Barber	Andrew Griffith	October 2016
12	Action Man: Revolution	John Barber	Drew Johnson	October 2016
13	Transformers: More than Meets the Eye: Revolution	James Roberts	Alex Milne	November 2016
14	Revolution #5	John Barber; Cullen Bunn	Fico Ossio	November 2016

== Collected editions ==
Title	Material collected	Release date	ISBN
Revolution	Revolution #0-5; Bonus material	January 19, 2017	163140816X; 978-1631408168
Revolution: Heroes	ROM: Revolution #1; M.A.S.K.: Mobile Armored Strike Kommand: Revolution #1; Micronauts: Revolution #1; G.I. Joe: Revolution #1; Action Man: Revolution #1; Bonus material	February 9, 2017	1631408410; 978-1631408410
Revolution: Transformers	Transformers: Till All Are One: Revolution #1; Transformers: Revolution #1; Transformers: More than Meets the Eye: Revolution #1; Transformers Holiday Special	February 16, 2017	1631408429; 978-1631408427
Revolution Deluxe HC	Revolution #0-5; All eight one-shot issues; Expended cover gallery	June 2017	978-1-63140-937-0

== Spin-off ==
In 2017, IDW released a miniseries titled Aw Yeah Revolution!, written and drawn by Art Baltazar, which represents a humorous version of the events of Revolution. The series was cancelled after three issues.

== Sequel ==
In April 2017, IDW and Hasbro announced a new crossover event titled First Strike and it will serve as the sequel to Revolution.

== Other media ==
On July 10, 2017, Hasbro announced to release a toy set titled Revolution Comic Crossover Preview Mega-Set as an anticipation to IDW's First Strike, and features sixteen figures from Transformers, G.I. Joe, Rom, Micronauts, Action Man, M.A.S.K., and Visionaries.
