= Infestation 2 =

Comic book series

Publication information
- Publisher: IDW Publishing
- Publication date: January–April 2012
- No. of issues: 12
- Main character(s): 30 Days of Night; CVO: Covert Vampiric Operations; Dungeons & Dragons; G.I. Joe; Groom Lake; Teenage Mutant Ninja Turtles; The Transformers; Weekly World News

Infestation 2 (stylized in some solicitations as Infes2ation) is a comic book crossover that was published by IDW Publishing from January to April 2012. Serving as the sequel to Infestation, it consisted of two book-end one-shots, and two-issue limited series from The Transformers, Dungeons & Dragons, Teenage Mutant Ninja Turtles, G.I. Joe and 30 Days of Night.

== Premise ==
A new threat emerges as Great Old Ones (based on the work of H. P. Lovecraft) break free from their cosmic prison and invade the universes of CVO: Covert Vampiric Operations, The Transformers: Hearts of Steel, Dungeons & Dragons, Teenage Mutant Ninja Turtles, G.I. Joe and 30 Days of Night, affecting the fabric of reality.

== Titles ==
=== Infestation 2 #1-2 ===
Published from January to April 2012. Written by Duane Swierczynski with art by David Messina.

=== Infestation 2: The Transformers #1-2 ===
Published biweekly in February 2012. Written by Chuck Dixon with art by Guido Guidi. The series is not a direct sequel to The Transformers: Infestation and takes place in the universe of The Transformers: Hearts of Steel.

=== Infestation 2: Dungeons & Dragons #1-2 ===
Published biweekly in February 2012. Written by Paul Crilley with art by Valerio Schiti.

=== Infestation 2: Team-Up #1 ===
Published in February 2012. Written by Chris Ryall with art by Alan Robinson. It is a humorous take on the event and features Archie from Groom Lake and Bat Boy from Weekly World News.

=== Infestation 2: Teenage Mutant Ninja Turtles #1-2 ===
Published biweekly in March 2012. Written by Tristan Jones with art by Mark Torres.

=== Infestation 2: G.I. Joe #1-2 ===
Published biweekly in March 2012. Written by Mike Raicht with art by Valentine de Landro.

=== Infestation 2: 30 Days of Night #1 ===
Published in April 2012. Written by Duane Swierczynski with art by Stuart Sayger.
