= First Strike (IDW Publishing) =

2017 comic book storyline

- Issue #1 cover by Max Dunbar and Freddie E. Williams II

Publication information
- Publisher: IDW Publishing (licensed by Hasbro)
- Schedule: 2017
- Format: Limited series
- Genre: Science fiction
- Publication date: August 9 – October 25, 2017
- No. of issues: 6, plus a 0 issue
- Main character: Hasbro Comic Book Universe

Creative team
- Written by: Mairghread Scott; David Rodriguez; John Barber
- Artist(s): Max Dunbar; Freddie E. Williams II; Netho Diaz; Walden Won
- Colorist(s): Ander Zarate; David Garcia Cruz

First Strike is a 2017 comic book storyline published by IDW Publishing, running from August 9 to October 25, 2017. It is the sequel to 2016's Revolution in the Hasbro Comic Book Universe. The story is written by Mairghread Scott and David Rodriguez, featuring art by Max Dunbar and Freddie E. Williams II, and colors by Ander Zarate. A few back-up strips were written by John Barber, with art by Netho Diaz and Walden Wong, and colors by David Garcia Cruz.

== Plot ==
After Optimus Prime annexed Earth into Cybertron's Council of Worlds, and following a tough encounter with a few Dire Wraiths, G.I. Joe's founder Joe Colton has decided to destroy all Transformers, as he believes they pose a threat to humanity. So he secretly resurfaces as "Baron Ironblood" and recruits criminals for his cause, including Doctor X, Storm Shadow, Destro, Miles Mayhem, Shazraella and Garrison Kreiger.

A year after the Ore-13 explosions, a unified Earth stands ready to join the interplanetary coalition as equals to the Transformers. With Marissa Faireborn appointed the official Council delegate and de facto ambassador of Earth, human diplomats and dignitaries assemble in Iacon for the occasion. But as Starscream makes his opening remarks, the ceremony is thrown into chaos as Colton's forces deploy sophisticated anti-Transformer weaponry against them. On Earth, G.I. Joe leader Scarlett races to discover Colton's motivations behind his evil deeds; hoping to save her former mentor from himself, she forges an alliance with Matt Trakker and Soundwave to find a way to Cybertron.

With Iacon in chaos, Colton and his team deploy Dr. Mindbender as a decoy Ironblood while the real Colton leads a team underground, using Shazraella to ferry the Talisman underground to its ultimate destination: by interchanging the Talisman with the core of Cybertron, Colton believes, its corrosive energies will poison the planet's energon from within and doom the species to extinction.

As the villains move on their objective, Garrison Kreiger deploys the bounty hunter Colditz to trick Centurion (his mind now fused with that of Mike "Atomic Man" Power and his body saturated with Talisman energy) into travelling into the wilds beyond Cybertron, luring the team of humans and Autobots to follow him in the hopes of killing him and tying up a loose end. Centurion survives, but deprived of his connection to the Talisman the heroes have lost their best chance at halting the invasion.

On Earth, Scarlett and a small team storm Castle Destro and hijack Destro's M.A.S.S. Device to reach the metal planet. On arriving, they unmask the imposter Ironblood but are immediately caught up in the volatile politics of the Council and summarily detained by Starscream. But as Ironhide's forces struggle to pin down Colton's strike team beneath Metroplex, Optimus Prime goes against the law by springing Scarlett and her team from jail as the villains close in on their objective, turning the journey towards the core into a race against time.

The chase culminates in a battle far beneath the planet's surface; having beaten the villains to their objective, their battle begins, but is soon thrown into chaos when the forces of the Council arrive to place both sides under arrest, turning the situation into a free-for-all. The conflict is cut short when Kreiger finally reveals his true identity as Merklynn, an ancient sorcerer from the planet Prysmos; his plan had always been to use the Talisman to transform Cybertron into a copy of his old homeworld, but unable to reach the core, he settles on using the Talisman's power transforming only a fragment of the planet into the arcane city of "New Prysmos," the first step on Merklynn's crusade to wipe out technology and usher in a new age of magic in the galaxy. Colton, defeated and broken by this betrayal, voluntarily stands down. Meanwhile, Cybertron has survived, but has lost much of its energon in Merklynn's attack, forcing it to rely even more heavily on Earth and the colony worlds.

In the aftermath, Cybertron itself burns through even more of its dwindling energon reserves to transmit a simple message deep into space: a message that awakens Unicron.

== Aftermath ==
The aftermath of First Strike will lead to new comic book series in the Hasbro Reconstruction line, as new alliances are forged, like M.A.S.K. joining forces with G.I. Joe, Rom teaming up with the Micronauts, and the introduction of Visionaries.

== Titles ==
=== Core series ===
Title	Writer(s)	Artist(s)
First Strike #0–6	Mairghread Scott and David Rodriguez	Max Dunbar and Freddie E. Williams II

=== One-shots ===
Title	Writer(s)	Artist(s)	Publication date
G.I. Joe: First Strike #1	Aubrey Sitterson	Ilias Kyriazis	September 20, 2017
Micronauts: First Strike #1	Christos N. Gage	Chris Panda	September 27, 2017
Optimus Prime: First Strike #1	John Barber	Guido Guidi	October 18, 2017
Rom: First Strike #1	Christos N. Gage	Chris Panda	October 18, 2017
M.A.S.K.: Mobile Armored Strike Kommand: First Strike #1	Aubrey Sitterson	Ilias Kyriazis	November 1, 2017
Transformers: First Strike #1	John Barber	Guido Guidi	November 8, 2017

== Collected editions ==
Title	Material collected	Release date	ISBN
First Strike	First Strike #0-6	February 20, 2018	1684051223; 978-1684051229
First Strike: Champions	Micronauts: First Strike #1; Optimus Prime: First Strike #1; G.I. Joe: First Strike #1; Rom: First Strike #1; Transformers: First Strike #1; M.A.S.K.: Mobile Armored Strike Kommand: First Strike #1	February 27, 2018	1684051231; 978-1684051236

== Sequel ==
In June 2017, David Hedgecock announced a new miniseries for 2018, later revealed to be titled as Transformers: Unicron, which is the finale of the 2005 HCBU franchise, which started in May and concluded in November 2018.
