= Transformers: Unicron =

Comic book limited series

- Cover art for issue #0 drawn by Sara Pitre-Durocher.

Publication information
- Publisher: IDW Publishing (licensed by Hasbro)
- Schedule: Bi-weekly
- Format: Limited series
- Genre: Science fiction
- Publication date: May 5 – November 14, 2018
- No. of issues: 0-6
- Main character: Hasbro Comic Book Universe

Creative team
- Written by: John Barber
- Artist: Alex Milne
- Colorist: Sebastian Cheng

Transformers: Unicron is a science fiction comic book limited series presented by IDW Publishing, in collaboration with Hasbro. The series was written by John Barber, with art from penciller Alex Milne and colorist Sebastian Cheng. Issue #0 was published during Free Comic Book Day (May 5, 2018) before running from July to October 2018, featuring references in Optimus Prime and Transformers: Lost Light.

The series introduces Unicron into the Hasbro Comic Book Universe following the events of "First Strike". The character had previously appeared on the Marvel comic book and the "Unicron Trilogy" anime series (Armada, Energon and Cybertron), specifically the comics version of the series produced by the defunct publisher Dreamwave Productions.

This series marks the conclusion of the Hasbro Comic Book Universe, primarily the Transformers comics, in advance of a reboot series in 2019.

== Plot ==
No.	Title	Release date	ISBN
00	Our Darkest	May 15, 2018	—
Artist: Alex Milne; From all across the galaxy, Cybertron begins losing contact with its colony worlds and the planets home to Shockwave's all-powerful Regenesis ores: LV-117, Gorlam Prime, Prion, and Velocitron are all consumed by the monster planet Unicron. As Unicron prepares to feed on Elonia, Optimus Prime and a rescue team rendezvous with Rom the Space Knight above the planet; with no idea how to stop it, Wheeljack instead proposes evacuating the Elonian population with a massive planetary spacebridge and sacrificing the planet. The Transformers begin setting up the spacebridge across Elonia's disintegrating surface, but nothing happens; Soundwave realizes that a Cybertronian Titan buried beneath Elonia's surface is blocking the activation signal, marking the doomed planet as yet another of Cybertron's colonies. Arcee kills the Titan and restores the spacebridge, and Wheeljack sacrifices himself to teleport everyone to safety as Unicron consumes Elonia and teleports away. Soundwave reports that two-thirds of Elonia's biological population were saved, and Optimus resolves to do better next time...even as Unicron reappears over Eukaris and prepares to feed again.
01	Last Stand	July 11, 2018	—
Artist: Alex Milne; Unicron has destroyed and devoured nine of Cybertron's thirteen colonies – LV-117, Gorlam Prime, Prion, Velocitron, Elonia, Eukaris, Arduria, Tsiehshi, and Devisun – and the Transformers track the movements of the planet-eater's Maximal army to conclude that its next target is Caminus. As the united military forces of Cybertron and Caminus engage Unicron, the Torchbearers work to bring the evacuation spacebridge online while Optimus, Arcee, and Bumblebee delve into the monster planet's interior to learn more about it. As Soundwave and Rom fight the Maximal horde side by side, Dirge and the Mistress of Flame are killed defending the Caminens; Unicron begins consuming Caminus and the planetary evacuation commences. Optimus, Arcee, and Bumblebee find the remains of an Omega Sentinel, an ancient Cybertronian war machine, deep within Unicron's core, and the entire population of Caminus is saved as Unicron consumes the planet. Starscream frees Shockwave from prison as the Camiens and Cybertronians return, and Shockwave offers Starscream a place at his side once Unicron and Cybertron have been destroyed. Starscream, however, declines and interrupts Optimus' team's frantic planning to declare that he and the other Decepticons have a plan.
02	Stranger Eons	July 25, 2018	—
Artist: Alex Milne; Starscream explains that he has been amassing a "Decepticon Vengeance Division" led by Bludgeon, reconnecting with and recalling all the remaining Decepticon forces scattered across the galaxy. As the massive Decepticon fleet intercepts and surrounds Unicron, Bumblebee and Aileron visit the comatose Omega Supreme to learn how and why Unicron consumed an Omega Sentinel. Starscream joins the remaining members of the Council of Worlds and reveals Shockwave's treachery, while Bumblebee mentally connects with Omega Supreme and the long-lost Chromia stumbles across the battle between Unicron and the Decepticon Vengeance Division. Omega Supreme reveals that long ago, an alien scientist created a doomsday weapon to destroy his war-torn world and the energies of this weapon traveled through space and time, destroying the planet Prysmos, mutating the survivors into Dire Wraiths, and eventually converting the scientist's world into Unicron. Bludgeon pledges himself and his troops to Unicron's service and mutates the Decepticon Vengeance Division into Maximal-like monsters, while Omega Supreme dies and Unicron transforms into a gargantuan robot mode to destroy Cybertron.
03	Our Finest	August 8, 2018	—
Artist: Alex Milne; Elita One and the Cybertronian fleet scramble in response to Unicron's new robot mode but comes under attack from the mutated Decepticon Vengeance Division. As Optimus, Starscream, Windblade, and Rom weigh their options, Bumblebee shares what he learned from Omega Supreme and Arcee fills in the blanks: the world that became Unicron was once Antilla, the very first planet conquered by the Thirteen Primes, making Unicron the ultimate instrument of destruction and retribution for Cybertron's past sins. The Torchbearers combine into Victorion and are attacked by the original Cybertronian combiner Monstructor, also mutated into a Maximal form, while Optimus interrogates Shockwave about his plans involving Unicron: under the identity of Onyx Prime, Shockwave discovered the doomsday device on the dead Antilla, renamed it "the Talisman," and eventually had it relocated to Cybertron, where it will poison Unicron once the giant consumes their homeworld. As Monstructor overpowers Victorion and Unicron destroys Elita One's Titan with a massive laser beam, everyone begins to panic; Soundwave attempts to use the Enigma of Combination to combine all of Cybertron into a gigantic combiner to fight Unicron head-on, but Windblade announces she has a plan and Starscream supports her even as Unicron begins to feed on Cybertron...
04	Road's End	September 5, 2018	—
Artist: Alex Milne; The combined forces of G.I. Joe assemble on Earth while Windblade enacts her plan: she and Ironhide request the Visionaries' help in magically transporting the entire population of Cybertron to Earth using the Talisman. As Unicron tears into Cybertron, the Talisman's magic teleports everyone it touches away; Blurr uses his super-speed to save as many lives as he can but is unable to escape and dies. Unaware of Windblade's plan, Optimus despairs as Shockwave teleports himself to Earth to prepare his future Decepticon Empire, and Metroplex transports those within him to Earth as well. Elita One sacrifices herself to allow the Talisman time to save the rest of the fleet as Unicron rips Cybertron apart and vanishes. Shockwave arrives in Toronto and orders his Maximal servants to purge the city while Bludgeon's Decepticon Vengeance Division fleet attacks the peaceful Decepticon Sanctuary Station in orbit above Jupiter, killing Cosmos, Sky-Byte, Laserbeak, and Buzzsaw. Shockwave realizes with horror that the Talisman was removed from Cybertron and Unicron still lives, while the survivors of Cybertron's destruction materialize in Africa and prepare for their final stand.
05	Assembly	October 10, 2018	—
Artist: Alex Milne; Atop the CN Tower, Shockwave attempts to establish contact with the Titan Nemesis (now forming Unicron's right eye) and search for the Talisman, unaware that a joint G.I. Joe-Cobra strike force has infiltrated the city. Thundercracker assists with emergency services and tries calling Marissa Faireborn, who is attending a strategy meeting with the many heroes, villains, and otherworldly residents of Earth inside Trypticon; those in attendance include the leaders of G.I. Joe, Cobra, and the world, the Dinobots, Joe Colton's Iron Ring, the Dire Wraiths, and are presently joined by a group of recent arrivals from Cybertron led by Soundwave. Jetfire realizes that the black hole and Regenesis ores Unicron consumed threatens the stability of space and time, and Bludgeon reveals his treachery to Shockwave. As the Maximals advance on the Transformers, Earth's air forces hold them back long enough for Destro to link his M.A.S.S. Device to Metroplex's spacebridge and teleport everyone to safety. The G.I. Joe strike team and Stardrive distract Shockwave's Maximal servants while Prowl sneaks into the city to confront him; Thundercracker reunites with Starscream and Skywarp to carry Optimus, Arcee, and the Talisman to Unicron while Metroplex and Trypticon unleash the combined forces of the Autobots, Decepticons, Space Knights, heroes, villains, and everyone else upon the monster planet and Bludgeon's fleet as a distraction.
06	Ceremony	November 14, 2018	—
Artists: Sara Pitre-Durocher, Andrew Griffith, Alex Milne, and Kei Zama; Soundwave, Jetfire, and Aileron summon the Aerialbots to Mount Rushmore, where Trypticon's sparks are being held for safekeeping, as the three Seekers move closer to Unicron and the battle against the Maximals in Earth's orbit and on the ground continues to rage. Unicron kills Trypticon with an eye laser as Prowl captures Shockwave and Thundercracker falls behind with the Talisman; Skywarp breaks off to save Thundercracker and Starscream sacrifices himself to activate the Talisman. As the Autobots and Decepticons react in shock to the vain and self-centered Starscream's heroic death, Ironhide is killed and the Dinobots board Bludgeon's Worldsweeper. Optimus jumps into the black hole inside Unicron, returning to the limbo realm of Infraspace and encountering the spirit of the Antillan scientist who originally created the Talisman, his anger and rage controlling Unicron from beyond the grave. Meanwhile, Soundwave's complex plan is put into action: Stardrive invades Shockwave's mind using her Dire Wraith magicks, and Jetfire remotely connects her to the Cybertronian Enigma of Combination. The Aerialbots combine into Superion with the power of the second Earth Enigma of Combination, but the Autobot combiner is attacked by Monstructor; the surviving Torchbearers and Slide combine into Victorion again and help Superion kill Monstructor. The Dinobots crash Bludgeon's Worldsweeper into the White House, killing almost all aboard, while the Junkions and Sharkticons destroy the surviving Maximals and save the President. Using the power of the two Enigmas, Soundwave telepathically connects the departed spirits of all those who died fighting Unicron and beyond, dying as he transmits their faith to Optimus through Shockwave and Stardrive's connection to the Talisman. As the mental landscape of Infraspace fades away, Optimus makes peace with the Antillan scientist as they die together. The Talisman destabilizes Unicron's black hole and consumes him from the inside out, and the survivors return to Earth as Bumblebee and Aileron save Arcee and reunite with the still-living Buzzsaw on the Moon. All across the planet, friends and family reunite as the new normal settles in; Thundercracker and Skywarp touch down together as brothers once again, Prowl takes Shockwave into custody, Rom and Livia comfort a young Elonian orphan as Sunstreaker remembers his brother Sideswipe, the surviving Dinobots Swoop and Strafe emerge from the White House's wreckage, and Pyra Magna takes up the mantle of Mistress of Flame and invites Slide to join the Torchbearers, the two female bots having finally moved past their rancor for Optimus. With Earth now existing in perfect balance between the Sun and Unicron's black hole, the Transformers prepare for a new life on a new homeworld thanks to the sacrifices of Optimus Prime and his followers: a life of peace without Autobots, Decepticons, Primes, or even the distinction between human and alien, where all are finally one.

== Reception ==
=== Issues ===
Issue	Writer(s)	Artist(s)	Colorist(s)	Publication date	Rating	Reviews	Reference
#0	John Barber	Alex Milne	Sebastian Cheng	May 2, 2018	9.7/10	2	
#1	John Barber	Alex Milne	Sebastian Cheng	July 11, 2018	7.6/10	7	
#2	John Barber	Alex Milne	Sebastian Cheng	July 25, 2018	8.5/10	5	
#3	John Barber	Alex Milne	David García Cruz, Sebastian Cheng	August 8, 2018	7.2/10	2	
#4	John Barber	Alex Milne	David García Cruz, Sebastian Cheng	August 8, 2018	8.1/10	3	
#5	John Barber	Alex Milne	David García Cruz	October 10, 2018	7.5/10	2	
#6	John Barber	Andrew Griffith, Kei Zama, Sara Pitre-Durocher	David García Cruz, Joana Lafuente	November 14, 2018	8.0/10	2	

== Reboot ==
Since March 2019 to June 2022, a new Transformers comic written by Brian Ruckley was being published alongside a few spin-offs and tie-ins.
