= IDW Publishing =

American comic book publishing company

- Official logo used since 2025.
- Parent company: Idea and Design Works, LLC
- Founded: 1999; 27 years ago
- Founder: Ted Adams; Alex Garner; Kris Oprisko; Robbie Robbins
- Country of origin: United States
- Headquarters location: San Diego, California
- Distribution: Penguin Random House Publisher Services (direct market starting June 2022); Diamond Comic Distributors (sub-distributor through Penguin Random House starting June 2022, direct market until June 2022)
- Publication types: Comics
- Fiction genres: Superhero; Action; Adventure; Science fiction; Fantasy; Horror; Mystery; Crime; Thriller
- Imprints: Black Crown; Blue Dream Studios; EA Comics; The Library of American Comics; Top Shelf Productions; Worthwhile Books; Yoe Books
- Owners: IDW Media Holdings, Inc.
- Official website: www.idwpublishing.com

IDW Publishing is an American publisher of comic books, graphic novels, art books, and comic strip collections. It was founded in 1999 as the publishing division of Idea and Design Works, LLC (IDW) and is the fifth-largest comic book publisher in the United States, behind Marvel, DC, Dark Horse, and Image Comics. The company is known for its licensed comic book adaptations of films, television shows, video games, and cartoons.

== History ==
=== 1990s ===
Idea and Design Works (IDW) was formed in 1999 by a group of comic book managers and artists (Ted Adams, Robbie Robbins, Alex Garner, and Kris Oprisko) that first met while working at Wildstorm Productions. Each of the four was equal partners, owning 25%. When Jim Lee sold Wildstorm to DC Comics in 1999, Lee turned that company's creative service department, previously run by Adams, over to IDW, allowing the company to achieve profitability in its first year and expand its publishing operations.

=== 2000s ===
In 2000, IDW developed a TV show concept, getting as far as a pilot episode. For the 2001's project, Adams's Ashley Wood talked to them about publishing an art book, thus starting up IDW Publishing. Una Fanta was published in March 2002. Woods had Steve Niles send Adams some of his rejected screenplays. Adams selected one, 30 Days of Night, and paired him with artist Ben Templesmith for a comic adaptation as a three-issue series, beginning in August 2002. With low pre-orders, Adams personally pushed the comic with the distributor and major comic book stores. Demand for the title's back issues increased, and it was followed by Wood's Popbot.

In 2007, IDT Corporation purchased a 53% majority interest in IDW from the company's founders, removing Garner & Oprisko, while reducing Adams & Robbins to minority owners collectively at 47%. Then, in 2009, IDT proceeded to increase its interest to the current 76%, reducing Adams & Robbins's interest once again to the current 24%. Then, shortly afterwards, IDT created CTM Media Holdings via a tax-free spin-off. This new company consisted of the majority interest in IDW and CTM Media Group. Eight years later, on April 3, 2015, CTM Media Holdings announced it would continue operations under a new name, becoming IDW Media Holdings, which would continue to consist of the majority interest in IDW and CTM Media Group.

The company's first traditional comic series, 30 Days of Night, created by Steve Niles and Ben Templesmith started a seven-figure bidding war between DreamWorks, MGM, and Senator International, with Senator winning and Sam Raimi attached to produce.

IDW Publishing's second title, Popbot, won two Gold Spectrum Awards.

IDW Publishing also publishes comics based on the TV franchises Star Trek and CSI. The company's other licensed comics include Topps' Mars Attacks, Sony's Underworld, FX's The Shield, Fox's 24 and Angel; Universal’s Land of the Dead and Shaun of the Dead; and Konami’s Silent Hill, Castlevania, Metal Gear Solid, and Speed Racer. The company has also had success with comic license from toy company Hasbro brands: The Transformers (with Takara), G.I. Joe, My Little Pony, and Jem. Transformers has had as many as five different titles running concurrently.

Beginning in 2008, the company licensed the Doctor Who series from the BBC, launching two concurrent titles: Doctor Who Classics, which reprints colorized comic strips featuring the past Doctors such as the Fourth Doctor and Fifth Doctor originally published in the late 1970s-early 1980s by Doctor Who Magazine, and Doctor Who: Agent Provocateur, an original six-part limited series featuring the Tenth Doctor and overseen and written by TV series script editor Gary Russell. An additional six-part limited series titled Doctor Who: The Forgotten started in mid-2008 by Tony Lee and Pia Guerra, as well as a series of monthly one-shot, self-contained stories. July 2009 saw the beginning of Doctor Who, an ongoing series featuring the Tenth Doctor, written by Tony Lee and illustrated by a rotating art team.

IDW Publishing acquired the G.I. Joe comics license in May 2008 (previously held by Devil's Due Publishing) and released three new series under editor Andy Schmidt, from writers such as Chuck Dixon, Larry Hama, and Christos Gage. Other comics were released in time to tie-in with the summer 2009 G.I. Joe film.

In March 2009, IDW Publishing forged an agreement with Mike Gold's Comicmix.com to publish print versions of Comicmix's online comic books. The agreement stipulates Comicmix must provide two comic books a month to IDW Publishing to publish, as well as graphic novels and trade paperbacks as demanded by the market. The books are published with both the IDW Publishing and Comicmix.com logos on the covers. As of the end of 2009, the agreement has produced print versions of the Grimjack series The Manx Cat; the Jon Sable series Ashes of Eden; Mark Wheatley and Robert Tinnell's pulp hero series Lone Justice; the graphic novel Demons of Sherwood by Tinnell and Bo Hampton; and a graphic novel collecting Trevor Von Eeden's The Original Johnson. A collection of Munden's Bar stories original to Comicmix's website is also forthcoming.

In late 2009, IDW acquired independent publisher Desperado Publishing.

In 2004, 2005, and 2006 IDW Publishing was named Publisher of the Year by Diamond Comic Distributors.

=== 2010s ===
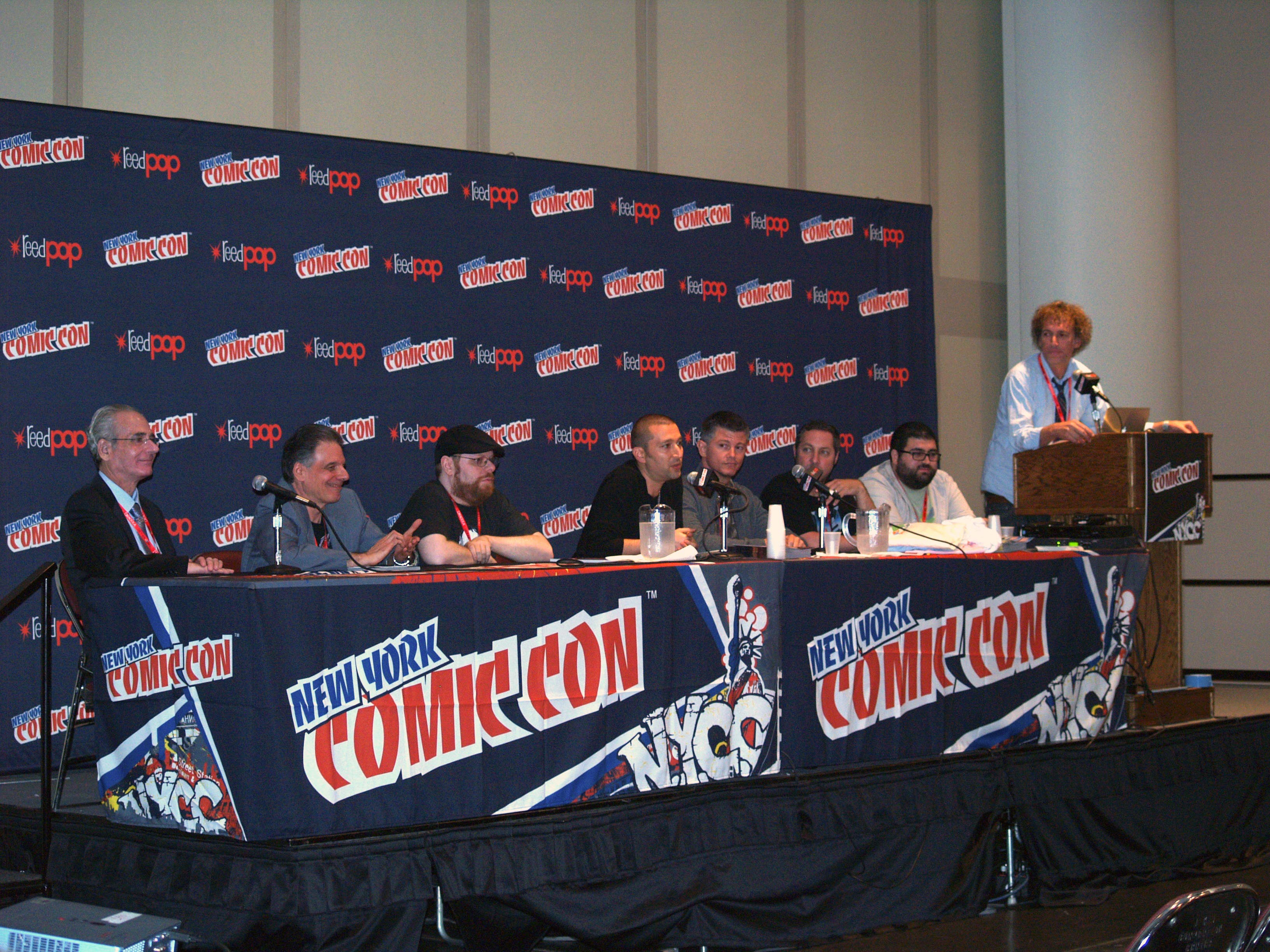
The IDW "Creator Visions" panel at the 2013 New York Comic Con. From left to right: writers Sidney Friedfertig, Gary Gerani, Adadsam Knave, Dan Goldman, M. Zachary Sherman, Jeff Kline, and Jason Enright. At the podium is IDW Vice President of Marketing Dirk Wood.

In 2010, IDW Publishing released the sequel to Michael San Giacomo's "Phantom Jack" Image Comics series with "Phantom Jack: The Nowhere Man Agenda." The graphic novel features the death of the main character, a reporter who can turn invisible.

IDW Publishing formed an imprint with EA Games in late 2009, called EA Comics, to focus on adaptations of the latter's video games, with initial titles including Army of Two and Dragon Age.

In January 2011, IDW Publishing announced a new Dungeons & Dragons comic series, under license from Hasbro and Wizards of the Coast. Set in the D&D 4th Edition core setting, the new ongoing series Dungeons & Dragons (Fell's Five) ran for 16 issues. Several mini-series were also published including The Legend of Drizzt: Neverwinter Tales written by R.A. Salvatore. Since 2014, five five-issue mini-series have been published in the D&D 5th Edition core setting. A sixth five-issue mini-series, Infernal Tide, is set to be published in November 2019.

In April 2011, IDW Publishing acquired the license to publish new collections of older Teenage Mutant Ninja Turtles comics, as well as a new ongoing series beginning in August of that year. In August 2017 issue #73 of the main ongoing series was published, making it the longest running comic series in the franchise's history.

September 6, 2011, for the 10th anniversary of 9/11, IDW Publishing teamed up Charlie Foxtrot Entertainment and released the graphic novel Code Word: Geronimo, written by retired Marine Corps Captain Dale Dye and Julia Dye, drawn by Gerry Kissell with inker Amin Amat. Code Word: Geronimo reached #22 on Diamond Comics top 100 list its first month after release. During that same year, the company has published its first crossover series Infestation.

In March 2012 IDW Publishing announced it would release new comics based on Judge Dredd and The Crow. Also in 2012, Hasbro licensed the use of My Little Pony: Friendship Is Magic for an IDW comic book series. The company also published Infestation 2.

In February 2013, IDW Publishing announced a partnership with Cartoon Network to publish comics based on the network's television series and reprint older Cartoon Network comics.

On January 6, 2015, IDW Publishing announced it had acquired Top Shelf Productions.

In February 2015, it was announced that IDW Publishing made a deal with Disney to continue the publication of the following comic books: Uncle Scrooge, Donald Duck, Mickey Mouse, and Walt Disney's Comics and Stories.

In 2016, IDW launched the Hasbro Reconstruction initiative to present a shared universe of Hasbro brands, which was later known as the Hasbro Comic Book Universe. The first event was Revolution, followed by First Strike on 2017 and concluding with Transformers: Unicron in 2018.

In April 2017, IDW Publishing acquired a license from Lucasfilm to produce a range of all-ages Star Wars comics.

In July 2017, Sega announced a partnership with IDW to publish comics based on Sonic the Hedgehog beginning in 2018, following the conclusion/cancellation of the previous series by Archie Comics. IDW has also launched new imprint called Black Crown, handling creator-owned comics.

In April 2018, publishers IDW Publishing and Oni Press announced a crossover between the Rick and Morty comic book and Dungeons & Dragons co-written by Jim Zub and Patrick Rothfuss with art by Troy Little. The four issue mini-series, Rick and Morty vs. Dungeons & Dragons, was first published in August 2018. In May 2019, a sequel mini-series was announced: Rick and Morty vs. Dungeons & Dragons: Chapter II: Painscape. It will be written by Jim Zub and Sarah Stern with art by Troy Little.

In 2019, the company experienced financial deficits and retained JPMorgan Chase to evaluate its strategic and financial options.

In May 2019, IDW offered itself as an investor in Clover Press, a new independent publisher founded by Ted Adams (cofounder and former CEO of IDW) and Robbie Robbins (cofounder, executive vice president, and art director at IDW).

In July 2019, it was announced that IDW Publishing had acquired the classic Sunday strip publisher Sunday Press Books.

=== 2020s ===
Between April and May 2020, during the COVID-19 pandemic, IDW was forced to furlough and then lay off several employees, including Managing Editor Denton Tipton, Associate Publisher David Hedgecock, Senior Graphic Artist Gilberto Lazcano, Senior Graphic Designer Christa Miesner, and Brand & Marketing Manager Spencer Reeve. In July 2020, Chris Ryall announced that he would step down from his position of President, Publisher, and Chief Creative Officer to launch a new imprint named Syzygy Publishing, but he is still editor of future Locke & Key projects. Jerry Bennington was promoted to President, Nachie Marsham was promoted to Publisher, and Rebekah Cahalin was promoted to General Manager and Executive Vice President of Operations covering IDW Publishing, and Veronica Brooks was promoted to Vice President of Creative Affairs.

Around 2021, IDW announced that the comic book license for Disney properties would pass to Marvel Comics, while the license for Lucasfilm's Star Wars passed back to Dark Horse Comics. In September 2021, IDW announced that its partnership with Diamond Comic Distributors would switch to Penguin Random House. In December 2021, The Library of American Comics announced that they would be moving to Clover Press. That same month, John Barber announced that he would step away from the role of editor-in-chief.

In January 2022, IDW announced that they would lose the comic book licenses for Hasbro's Transformers and G.I. Joe by the end of the year, but would continue publishing other Hasbro licenses, including My Little Pony and Wizards of the Coast's Dungeons & Dragons; those licenses would later leave to Boom! Studios and Dark Horse Comics respectively.

On April 27, 2023, IDW cut 39% of their staff and became privately held by delisting from the New York Stock Exchange; the company also restructured its C-suite and experienced an almost 50% drop in its share price.

On October 16, 2024, IDW announced a rebranding with a new logo.

In March 2025, IDW announced a partnership with Alien Books.

On June 16, 2025, according to Bleeding Cool, IDW stated that it would continue its operations for at least one more year.

In January 2026, IDW announced a new imprint named IDW Crime, which features comic books focused on crime fiction.

== Logo ==
1999–2015; first logo.

10th anniversary logo.

2015–2025; second logo.

20th anniversary logo.

25th anniversary logo.

2025–present; third logo.

== Imprints ==
IDW has several imprints that they have developed or acquired:

=== Current ===
- Blue Dream Studios
- EA Comics
- IDW Crime
- IDW Dark
- Sunday Press Books
- Top Shelf Productions
- White Ash Comics
- Worthwhile Books
- Yoe Books

=== Former ===
- Black Crown
- Hasbro Comic Book Universe (succeeded by the Energon Universe by Skybound Entertainment)
- The Library of American Comics (moved to Clover Press)

== Publications ==
=== Yoe Books ===
- The Creativity of Ditko
- Barney Google: Gambling, Horse Races & High-Toned Women
- The Carl Barks' Big Book of Barney Bear
- The Complete Milt Gross
- Dan DeCarlo's Jetta
- Dick Briefer's Frankenstein (The Chilling Archives of Horror Comics)
- Felix the Cat's Greatest Comic Book Tails
- The Golden Collection of Klassic Krazy Kool Kids Komics
- The Great Treasury of Christmas Comic Book Stories
- Krazy & Ignatz: Tiger Tea
- Bob Powell's Terror (The Chilling Archives of Horror Comics)
- Popeye: The Great Comic Book Tales by Bud Sagendorf
- Zombie (The Chilling Archives of Horror Comics)

== Adaptations in other media ==
- 30 Days of Night (Columbia Pictures)
- CVO: Covert Vampiric Operations — Rogue State (Konami)
- Locke & Key (TV series, Netflix, 2020–2022)
- October Faction (TV series, Netflix, 2019)
- Transformers: Movie Prequel
- V Wars (TV series, Netflix)
- Wynonna Earp (TV series, Syfy, 2016–2021)

=== Planned projects ===
- Aleister Arcane
- Brooklyn Animal Control
- Darkness Visible
- The Suicide Forest
