= The Transformers: Spotlight =

Comic book series

- Issue #1 featuring Shockwave

Publication information
- Publisher: IDW Publishing
- Format: One shots
- Publication date: September 2006 – April 2010; December 2012 – May 2013
- No. of issues: 31
- Main character: Transformers

Creative team
- Created by: Hasbro

The Transformers: Spotlight is a comic book series of one-shot issues, published by IDW Publishing.

The series consists of single-issue stories based on IDW's Generation 1 fictional universe, each featuring an individual character. Split in volumes of 5, the first volume featured Shockwave, Nightbeat, Hot Rod, Sixshot, and Ultra Magnus. The second featured Soundwave, Kup, Galvatron, Optimus Prime and Ramjet. The third featured Blaster, Arcee, Mirage and Grimlock and Wheelie, with four more issues comprising The Transformers: Revelation. Although the Shockwave and Nightbeat issues were numbered #1 and #2 respectively, individual numbering for the series was abandoned with the Hot Rod issue as the series expanded beyond five issues. In addition to being stand-alone, most of these issues tie into the main series, and offer additional context.

== Issues ==
| No. | Title | Release date | ISBN |
|---|---|---|---|
| 01 | Spotlight: Shockwave | September 13, 2006 | — |
Writer: Simon Furman; Artist: Nick Roche; Six hundred thousand years ago, during the Cybertronian civil war between the Autobots and Decepticons, the Decepticon scientist Shockwave launches thirteen missiles of raw Energon at thirteen different worlds in an attempt to create a new energy source for the dying Cybertron. Dubbing his project the Regenesis Program, Shockwave eventually leaves Cybertron in secret to personally observe the effects the samples have had on the Regenesis planets. Arriving on the thirteenth world in the midst of its final Ice Age, Shockwave is unaware that the Dynobots have followed him, seeking revenge for a past slight. To protect themselves from the planet's high levels of Energon radiation, the Dynobots adopt the forms of fossilized organic creatures and attack Shockwave. Unable to comprehend the logicality of their spiteful assault, the emotionless Shockwave shuts down his higher functions and brutally defeats them using rage-stimulating programming. Before Shockwave can leave, however, the Dynobots' ship causes a nearby volcano to erupt, entombing all six Cybertronians in a pit of lava. Suspicious of Shockwave's extended absence, Decepticon leader Megatron assigns Bludgeon to decode his laboratory notes while in 2006, a team of archaeologists in Eureka, Nevada uncovers Shockwave's hand.
| 02 | Spotlight: Nightbeat | October 18, 2006 | — |
Writer: Simon Furman; Artist: M.D. Bright; Autobot detective Nightbeat purchases the flight recorder from the missing Cybertronian exploration vessel Ark-1 but finds the seller's corpse instead. Intrigued by the mystery, Nightbeat travels to the flight recorder's excavation site on Gorlam Prime only to find more mysteries: the native populace has developed into biomechanical cyborgs far too quickly and deep mining shafts litter the planet's surface. Nightbeat descends into Gorlam Prime's underground and finds fragments of Cybertronian metal dating back to the Ark-1’s era, Cybertronian-sized tunnels, and a strange silvery portal. He attempts to leave but is incapacitated by a horde of Micromasters and forcibly converted into a sleeper agent for mysterious beings from the "Dead Universe" to assist in their "Expansion" plans. Released with no memory of the incident, Nightbeat is summoned to Earth by Autobot leader Optimus Prime.
| 03 | Spotlight: Hot Rod | November 15, 2006 | — |
Writer: Simon Furman; Artist: Nick Roche; As Hot Rod infiltrates the Decepticon penal colonies on the planet Styx, he reflects on his first mission as an Autobot field commander and its subsequent failure. Hot Rod's team was assigned to steal a mysterious artifact known as the Magnificence from the powerful Omega Guardians, but the mission was compromised when their stealth measures failed and the Guardians destroyed the other Autobots. Under secret orders to retrieve the Magnificence at all costs, Hot Rod was forced to leave Dealer, the last surviving Autobot, behind in a Decepticon ambush. Now, Hot Rod sows chaos within the prison to rescue Dealer, and the two Autobots successfully escape. However, Dealer is really a secret Decepticon double agent and the reason for the earlier mission's failure; he reports to his Decepticon handler Banzaitron, who jokingly refers to him as "Doubledealer."
| 04 | Spotlight: Sixshot | December 20, 2006 | — |
Writer: Simon Furman; Artist: Rob Ruffalo; Stationed on a remote outpost, the bored Decepticon super-warrior Sixshot learns that the Terrorcons, who admire him and are the only Decepticons he considers friends, have gone missing on the planet Mumu-Obscura. Sixshot arrives on the devastated planet and encounters the Reapers, a group of crazed rogue super-warriors dedicated to the destruction of all life. The Deathbringer, the leader of the Reapers, offers Sixshot a place among their ranks on the condition that he kills the captured Terrorcons. After some deliberation, Sixshot declines, and the Reapers allow the Decepticons to leave with the promise that they will find Sixshot again.
| 05 | Spotlight: Ultra Magnus | January 17, 2007 | — |
Writer: Simon Furman; Artist: Robby Musso; Autobot lawman Ultra Magnus arrests the Decepticon arms dealer Swindle but allows him to go free in exchange for galactic criminal mastermind Scorponok's location. Magnus infiltrates Scorponok's operations on the planet Nebulos and discovers strange experiments being performed on the native Nebulans, some of whom have been biomechanically re-engineered to transform like Cybertronians. After defeating a squadron of headless Cybertronian drones, Magnus confronts Scorponok and shoots him in the face, forcing the injured Decepticon to retreat. Sometime later, Magnus apprehends Swindle again, who once more tries to barter his freedom with new information on Scorponok.
| 06 | Spotlight: Soundwave | March 21, 2007 | — |
Writer: Simon Furman; Artist: Marcelo Matere; After assigning Bludgeon to decode Shockwave's laboratory notes, Megatron assigns his loyal servant Soundwave to monitor the untrustworthy Bludgeon. When Bludgeon and his followers depart Cybertron following Shockwave's research, Soundwave tracks them to Earth and observes them claim a cache of Ultra-Energon in 1984. When Soundwave requests a cut of the profits, however, Bludgeon informs him that his team plans to resurrect the former Decepticon scientist Thunderwing, whose biomechanical carapace upgrade previously drove him mad and devastated Cybertron. Although Soundwave attempts to stop them, Bludgeon's team traps him in his cassette deck alternate mode and buries him under rubble. One year later, Soundwave's minions Ravage and Laserbeak are excavated and imprisoned by a mysterious government organization, while Soundwave himself is brought to a local pawn shop and purchased by a teenager.
| 07 | Spotlight: Kup | April 25, 2007 | — |
Writer: Nick Roche; Artist: Nick Roche; On a strange desert planet covered in yellow crystals, the stranded Autobot veteran Kup sees a strange green apparition and defends himself from a horde of zombie robots. After recharging himself with the crystals, Kup slaughters another horde of the zombies the next night. However, the radiation from the crystals has severely damaged Kup's mind, and the "zombies" are Autobots wearing protective armor sent to rescue him by his protégé Springer. Prowl and Perceptor attempt to dissuade him from sacrificing any more lives, but Springer summons Trailbreaker, whose personal forcefields protect him from the radiation, to try and rescue Kup instead. The sight of Trailbreaker shocks Kup long enough for the Autobots to retrieve him, but the experience has left his mind, body, and spark extremely weakened, leaving Springer to wonder whether the rescue was worth it.
| 08 | Spotlight: Galvatron | July 4, 2007 | — |
Writer: Simon Furman; Artist: Guido Guidi; The ancient undead Cybertronian Galvatron, who once served aboard the Ark-1, destroys an exploration vessel near the Benzuli Expanse before continuing on to Cybertron at the behest of his mysterious master. On Cybertron, serving with Hound's unit, the bored Sideswipe chafes at the menial job of guarding Thunderwing's inert body, but Galvatron arrives and attacks the Autobots. Although Sideswipe and his comrades fight valiantly, Galvatron easily overpowers them but decides to spare them as a small rebellion against his master. When the Autobots awaken, they find that Galvatron has escaped with Thunderwing's body.
| 09 | Spotlight: Optimus Prime | August 29, 2007 | — |
Writer: Simon Furman; Artist: Don Figueroa; Still recovering from his near-death experience at Megatron's hands and the sinister presence he felt while in the limbo realm of Infraspace, Optimus Prime confers with the titanic ancient Autobot Omega Supreme. Omega informs Optimus that the dark presence belonged to Nova Prime, one of Cybertron's past rules who believed their race was superior to all others. Nova and his followers departed the planet long ago aboard the exploration vessel Ark-1, which both Autobots suspect was really a warship meant for colonization. Their conversation is interrupted when Monstructor, the original Cybertronian combiner whom Omega previously imprisoned, attacks them. On the injured Omega's advice, Optimus splits Monstructor into his component pieces and summons Jetfire to transport them away, musing on the power of the gestalt technology and the corrupted lineage of the Cybertronian Primes.
| 10 | Spotlight: Ramjet | November 7, 2007 | — |
Writer: Stuart Moore; Artist: Robby Musso; Disillusioned with the recent string of failures from Megatron and Starscream, Ramjet attempts to recruit a skeptical Skywarp into his planned takeover of the Decepticons. Using a small army of Mini-Constructicons and Harrison, a poorly-made human facsimile working at the Pentagon, Ramjet plans to devastate the United States using hijacked nuclear missiles, acquire a feasible Energon substitute, develop a device capable of tracking every Cybertronian throughout the galaxy, enslave humanity and the other Decepticons, and eventually conquer the universe through a complex space bridge network. However, before Ramjet can actually enact any of these plans, Megatron kills him and scatters his parts around the world.
| 11 | Spotlight: Blaster | January 23, 2008 | — |
Writer: Simon Furman; Artist: Emiliano Santalucia; Beloved Autobot radio broadcaster Blaster is found critically injured after an attempt on his life by an unknown Autobot. Blaster is repaired by Perceptor and warmly welcomed back into the Autobot ranks, but he is unable to shake the paranoia following the assassination attempt and resolved to find the Autobot responsible. After narrowly escaping the assassin again, Blaster and Perceptor cross-reference personnel files to determine a list of four suspects: Mirage, Beachcomber, Inferno, and Bluestreak, all of whom Blaster considers close friends. Blaster baits the assassin out with a false broadcast and is shocked to discover that the normally pacifistic Beachcomber is the culprit, albeit under Soundwave and Bombshell's mind control. Beachcomber overrides the mental control with Blaster's encouragement but severely damages his mind in the process; Perceptor doubts he will fully recover, and Blaster swears vengeance on Soundwave.
| 12 | Spotlight: Arcee | February 20, 2008 | — |
Writer: Simon Furman; Artist: Alex Milne; After a long protracted battle across the universe, Ultra Magnus finally subdues the rogue warrior Arcee, removing and imprisoning her spark in a high-security penitentiary on Garrus-9. The prison's warden Fortress Maximus confers with Jetfire and the Technobots about extracting the sparks of the Monstructor components in the same manner, but the Combaticons break into Garrus-9 to rescue them. Maximus reluctantly repairs and releases Arcee to stop the Decepticons, but she is unable to prevent them from escaping with the prisoners. She offers to continue hunting them if Maximus allows her to go free, revealing that Monstructor's creator Jhiaxus forcibly and painfully transitioned her gender before leaving her to die with no aftercare support. Although Maximus disagrees with Arcee's thirst for revenge, he and Jetfire ultimately accept her proposal.
| 13 | Spotlight: Mirage | March 5, 2008 | — |
Writer: George Strayton; Artist: Guido Guidi; In an alternate universe, Mirage is a Decepticon spy working to bring the Autobot resistance down from the inside. As the battered Autobots attempt to refuel using a strange substance called Zodiac with cross-dimensional properties, Mirage initiates a battle between the two factions and is forced to kill many of his Autobot friends. During the fight, he is knocked into the Zodiac energy chamber and experiences a vision of another universe where he truly is an Autobot; in the regular universe, meanwhile, Mirage awakens from a strange dream where he was a Decepticon spy.
| 14 | Spotlight: Grimlock | April 23, 2008 | — |
Writer: Simon Furman; Artist: Marcelo Matere; The secret government organization Skywatch reactivates a dormant extraterrestrial robot codenamed "Thunder Lizard 1" in response to a potential invasion by others of the robot's kind. However, the robot, otherwise known as the Dynobot Grimlock, breaks free of Skywatch's control and escapes the facility. The disoriented Grimlock wanders through the streets of Nevada and eventually arrives at the Lahontan Dam, where he is met by his old rival Scorponok. Scorponok requests Grimlock's help in subjugating Earth, claiming that the other four Dynobots are dead and Ultra Magnus is hunting him, but Grimlock attacks him instead. However, Scorponok's Headmaster upgrade gives him a clear advantage, and Grimlock is nearly killed before he teleports himself to his ship, buried in ice somewhere on Earth. Skywatch begins reactivating four more "Thunder Lizards" while Scorponok's human allies, the Machination, plan to seize control of them and destroy Grimlock.
| 15 | Spotlight: Wheelie | June 18, 2008 | — |
Writer: Simon Furman; Artist: Klaus Scherwinski; Often overlooked by his fellow Autobots due to his small size, Wheelie finally receives his own solo mission to scout for habitable worlds. However, he crash-lands on the planet LV-117 and injures his arm while fighting off its gigantic native monsters. Although another ship soon crashes on LV-117, Wheelie discovers it was crewed by the Decepticon Reflector trio; he finds Viewfinder's corpse inside the ship and saves a local alien named Varta from Spectro and Spyglass. Since Varta's translator can only interpret Wheelie if he speaks in rhyme, the little Autobot adopts this speech pattern as he helps Varta repair another ship. Spectro and Spyglass take Varta hostage and steal the ship, but are destroyed after failing to notice Wheelie sabotaging it. Wheelie and Varta salvage what they can from the remains of the ships, unaware of a mural in a nearby temple depicting strange tentacled creatures.
| 16 | Spotlight: Cyclonus – Revelation Part One | June 18, 2008 | — |
Writer: Simon Furman; Artist: E. J. Su; Angered by the devastation Cybertron has suffered since leaving aboard the Ark-1, the undead Cyclonus diverts from his assigned mission and attacks the Autobot vessel Ark-12, crewed by Hound's unit and en route to Garrus-9. Ultra Magnus, also on course to Garrus-9, receives their distress signal and moves to assist them, while Optimus Prime and Prowl meet with Fortress Maximus and Jetfire about the unethical treatment of Decepticon prisoners. Nightbeat requests Hardhead's help in determining why he cannot remember visiting Gorlam Prime, and Magnus saves Hound's unit while Arcee tortures a Decepticon for information regarding the Monstructor Six's whereabouts. Cyclonus flees and successfully activates a mysterious device on the planet Corata-Vaz, but is attacked by Magnus and Hound's unit before he can leave. Cyclonus activates the device's guardian Thunderwing and escapes in the confusion; Optimus sends the Wreckers, an Autobot black-ops unit, to investigate the device Thunderwing is guarding while the undead denizens of the Dead Universe, led by Nemesis Prime, prepare their "Expansion."
| 17 | Spotlight: Hardhead – Revelation Part Two | July 18, 2008 | — |
Writer: Simon Furman; Artist: Nick Roche; Nightbeat returns to Gorlam Prime with Hardhead and instructs his friend to kill him should anything go wrong. They discover that the planet's population has fully evolved into a mechanical race and Hardhead is attacked by a horde of Micromasters, though Nightbeat is completely ignored. On Corata-Vaz, the Wreckers unsuccessfully battle Thunderwing as Omega Supreme identifies Cyclonus as one of the Ark-1’s crew, last seen near the Benzuli Expanse. In the Dead Universe, Jhiaxus reports to Nemesis Prime that two more devices and their guardians have been activated, who then orders him to eliminate Nightbeat and Hardhead. Arcee tracks the Monstructor Six to the remains of a battlefield and finds an injured Banzaitron, who informs her that someone stole the combiner from the Decepticons and offers his help in locating them. Jhiaxus remotely takes control of Nightbeat and attacks Hardhead, whose extreme durability allows him to survive and kill Nightbeat. Hardhead enters the Dead Universe portal in Gorlam Prime's underground as Optimus sends an Autobot team of Cloudburst, Landmine, Groundbreaker, and Waverider to investigate the Benzuli Expanse. Optimus then receives a call from Dealer, who suggests using the Magnificence to end the conflict.
| 18 | Spotlight: Doubledealer – Revelation Part Three | August 20, 2008 | — |
Writer: Simon Furman; Artists: Dan Khanna, Frank Milkovish, and Robert Atkins; Hot Rod agrees to take Dealer to the Magnificence's location as Straxus and Grindcore of the Dead Universe arrive on Earth to harvest Energon in China's Jiangxi Province. Galvatron and Cyclonus target Cloudburst's ship as Nemesis Prime arrives on Garrus-9 and attacks his successor Optimus Prime. As Hot Rod and Dealer arrive at the Magnificence's hiding place, Jetfire and the Technobots prepare "Pretender" shells for Cloudburst's crew based on Thunderwing's research while Nemesis overpowers Optimus with the power of the Dead Universe's Darkness. Hot Rod uses the Magnificence's all-knowing powers to discern Dealer's treachery and kills him, then provides Ultra Magnus with information about Nemesis Prime's plans and technologies. As the Wreckers continue to battle Thunderwing, Jhiaxus prepares his backup guardian, Bludgeon.
| 19 | Spotlight: Sideswipe – Revelation Part Four | October 8, 2008 | — |
Writer: Simon Furman; Artist: E. J. Su; As Hound's unit engages Straxus and Grindcore, Sideswipe resolves to save his arrogant brother Sunstreaker in order to prove himself. The Technobots save Cloudburst's crew from Cyclonus and outfit them in the stabilized Pretender shells while Jetfire deactivates Thunderwing, giving the Wreckers access to the Nega-Core he was guarding. They are quickly attacked by Bludgeon as the Darkness attempts to possess Optimus, while Sideswipe engages Straxus and Grindcore alone to give the other Autobots time to retrieve the Nega-Cores and save Arcee from Monstructor. Distracted by the removal of the Nega-Cores and the Autobots breaching the Benzuli Expanse, Jhiaxus fails to notice Arcee arriving on Gorlam Prime using a space bridge. Galvatron betrays Nemesis and kills him, requesting that Optimus give him the Darkness, but the Autobot leader throws the ancient Cybertronian into a solar pool as the transfer occurs. The Autobot Pretenders successfully collapse the Dead Universe portals with the Nega-Cores, killing Straxus and Grindcore; Hardhead distracts the fleeing Jhiaxus long enough for Arcee to catch up, and the scientist's undead immortality means she is free to kill him over and over again. Although the Expansion has been foiled, Jetfire worries about the future of Gorlam Prime, whose inhabitants have completed their biological transformation into fully robotic beings and now refer to their world as "Cybertron."
| 20 | Spotlight: Blurr | November 5, 2008 | — |
Writer: Shane McCarthy; Artist: Casey Coller; The arrogant and self-centered Blurr was once the undisputed champion of Cybertron's racing circuits, but the tracks were forced to close after a Decepticon terrorist attack. Blurr's pit crew chief Piston leaves the racing business to sign up with the Autobots, and the dejected ex-racer is approached by Starscream with an offer to join the Decepticons. Blurr accidentally stumbles into an active war zone while looking for an open bar and is saved by Ironhide, finding the bodies of Piston and former racing comrade Fasttrack. Blurr is taken to the Autobot commander, a young police officer named Orion Pax, who requests that Blurr use his super-speed to break through the Decepticon lines and save Cybertronian leader Zeta Prime from an assassination squad. Although Blurr is at first angered to see Cybertron's "Golden Age" crumbling to pieces, he agrees to help the Autobots and is pleased to know he is doing what matters.
| 21 | Spotlight: Jazz | April 1, 2009 | — |
Writers: Josh van Reyk and Shaun Knowler; Artist: E. J. Su; To calm the arguing Cliffjumper and Bumblebee, Tracks tells them a story about the enduring power of hope Autobots bring one another. In the early days of the war, Tracks's unit was destroyed by the Predacons, leaving him blinded and unable to transform. He is saved by Jazz, whom he does not recognize, but the two are soon ambushed by the Predacons again. As part of Jazz's improvised plan, Tracks goads the Predacons into attacking, leaving Jazz free to take out Tantrum, Headstrong, and Rampage. With Jazz's encouragement, Tracks musters enough strength to transform and incapacitate Divebomb, while Razorclaw is forced to retreat when Autobot backup arrives. By the end of Tracks's story, he has gathered a large Autobot audience and successfully bolstered morale. Prowl and Jazz send the Autobots out on patrol, and Jazz thanks Tracks for the inspiring story before leaving himself.
| 22 | Spotlight: Drift | April 8, 2009 | — |
Writer: Shane McCarthy; Artist: Casey Coller; Two aliens allow a mysterious cloaked figure access to a docked Decepticon space cruiser over their shared hatred of Cybertornians, despite the fact that the cloaked figure is also Cybertronian. The mystery Cybertronian infiltrates the cruiser, but his cover is immediately blown when the Wreckers independently attack and storm the ship. As the ship's commander Turmoil orders his Decepticons to destroy the intruders, the Wreckers encounter the factionless Cybertronian; as both parties are there to rescue a group of Autobot prisoners, Kup allows the mystery Cybertronian to accompany them. The prisoners are rescued, but Turmoil shoots Perceptor and separates Kup and the mystery Cybertronian, whom he identifies as his former second-in-command Deadlock, from the other Wreckers. Kup is initially distrustful of the former Decepticon, but Deadlock – who has since readopted his original name Drift – explains that he was found by a neutral sect of peaceful Cybertronian monks and granted a second chance at life. Drift and Kup rig the ship to explode but are attacked by Turmoil; after buying Kup enough time to retreat, Drift incapacitates Turmoil and escapes with Perceptor as the ship explodes. In the aftermath, Drift attempts to leave but instead accepts an impressed Kup's invitation to join his unit.
| 23 | Spotlight: Cliffjumper | June 17, 2009 | — |
Writer: Shane McCarthy; Artist: Robby Musso; Cliffjumper crashlands on a remote planet and encounters two young aliens named Kita and Coll, orphans who maintain their family's farm with help from a nearby village. Kita and Coll determine Cliffjumper is friendly and offer him enough synthetic Energon to refuel, and the little red Autobot in turn helps the siblings revitalize their farm. One day, though, a Decepticon unit lands on the planet and threatens Coll; although Cliffjumper manages to kill three of the Decepticons, Kita is fatally injured during the skirmish. Cliffjumper stays with Kita until she dies and destroys the remaining Decepticons in a fit of rage. After burying Kita's body and ensuring Coll is taken in by the village, Cliffjumper steals the Decepticon ship to rejoin the Autobot forces.
| 24 | Spotlight: Metroplex | July 1, 2009 | — |
Writer: Andy Schmidt; Artist: Marcelo Matere; Sixshot destroys an orbital Autobot research facility for its top-secret information, and the Throttlebots, the station's lone survivors, flee to the planet below and discover an abandoned Cybertronian city. Before they can escape, Sixshot finds them and pursues them through the city, informing them that Megatron freed him from Jhiaxus's control following the Expansion in exchange for the undead scientist's technology. The Decepticon super-warrior injures three of the six Throttlebots, but the city suddenly grows a gigantic arm and smashes Sixshot into the ground. The Throttlebots are amazed to see Sixshot stand up intact, but the city fully transforms into the ancient Titan Metroplex and stomps Sixshot into oblivion. Metroplex sadly informs the Throttlebots he cannot help them, as he must remain focused on his own mission, but directs them to a shuttle with medical supplies before departing the planet. The Throttlebots wonder what information Metroplex is protecting as they too leave, unaware that the crushed Sixshot is, in fact, still alive.
| 25 | Ride-Along – Spotlight: Prowl | April 21, 2010 | — |
Writer: Mike Costa; Artist: E. J. Su; In the aftermath of the Decepticon invasion of Earth, Optimus Prime and Prowl survey the ruins of New York City and discuss the terrible costs of their victory. While Optimus feels obligated to help humanity rebuild, Prowl argues that they will see no distinction between Autobot and Decepticon and lash out at any Cybertronian they see. To prove his point, Optimus assigns Prowl to go undercover as a normal police car and observe the humans' behavior at their lowest. Prowl comes to admire human ingenuity and resilience in their state of crisis but also recognizes that they will never forgive the Cybertronians for destroying their home while watching a group of policemen execute the injured Decepticon Thrust. After considering the mathematical morality that a human's life is just as important as a Cybertronian's, despite the vast population difference, Prowl breaks cover to save a young girl from a collapsing building and is trapped under the rubble. Although his human driver is surprised at his self-sacrificial decision, he agrees with Prowl's conclusion and gives him enough time to escape before reporting the incident.
| - | Omega's Conundrum – Spotlight: Orion Pax | December 12, 2012 | — |
Writer: James Roberts; Artist: Steve Kurth; At Autobot Headquarters on Cybertron, Wheeljack, Kaput, and Rung oversee Orion Pax's reformatting into a stronger body for a dangerous mission. He, Nightbeat, and Alpha Trion have been assigned by Zeta Prime to exchange an unknown Decepticon prisoner for well-respected Autobot medic Ratchet at a remote location within the Sea of Rust. After Orion fends off a pack of animalistic Slicers, the prisoner attempts to escape but is quickly subdued and revealed to be Rack'n'Ruin, a pair of Decepticon conjoined twins unable to transform and worth no strategic value. Thundercracker escorts the Autobots to the meeting point, where Bludgeon betrays them and kidnaps Alpha Trion, intending to find his old partner Metroplex and take control of the ancient Titan's space bridge. Orion starts a firefight to allow Nightbeat, Alpha Trion, and Rack'n'Ruin to escape, but Bludgeon captures him and ties him to a shuttle directed at the nearest city. Orion breaks his bonds using Rack'n'Ruin's instantaneous transformation technique, then safely crashes the shuttle outside the city limits.
| - | The Hunting Party – Spotlight: Thundercracker | January 16, 2013 | — |
Writer: John Barber; Artists: Chee and Ronda Pattinson; Megatron assigns a unit of Decepticons to search the galaxy for the missing Metroplex, including Bludgeon, Thundercracker, Blitzwing, and Waspinator. Tired of his teammates and commander, Thundercracker finally discovers evidence of Metroplex's location and guides the Decepticons to an alien planetoid fuelled by a river of pseudo-Energon. Bludgeon attacks the planetoid's inhabitants in hopes of drawing Metroplex out; appalled by the senseless destruction of non-combatants, Thundercracker leaves to explore the planetoid's interior, unaware that the Autobots Bumblebee, Jetfire, and Nightbeat have engaged Bludgeon's unit above. Thundercracker discovers Metroplex hibernating within the pseudo-Energon reservoir and is attacked by Bumblebee, but both Cybertronians are convinced to stand down by a local alien's bravery. Thundercracker allows Metroplex to escape and lies to Bludgeon, who sends him back to the Decepticon front lines for his supposed failure.
| - | Spotlight: Megatron | February 6, 2013 | — |
Writer: Nick Roche; Artist: Nick Roche; Soundwave leads the revived Megatron through the remnants of the Decepticon forces, who fumes at the depraved and pathetic state of his once-mighty army. Megatron manages to extricate himself from Soundwave's lurking presence and Shockwave's suspect experiments long enough to confront Starscream, whose three-year tenure as Decepticon leader has all but destroyed their faction, but instead finds the normally hot-tempered and volatile Seeker a timid and depressed shell of himself. Although Starscream begs for death, Megatron manages to rouse his anger long enough for a fight to break out, and the Decepticon leader beats Starscream to within an inch of his life for his many spectacular failures. With Starscream accepting his place as second-in-command, and Soundwave and Shockwave resuming their respective roles as his trustworthy and untrustworthy lieutenants, Megatron revitalizes the remaining Decepticons with a fiery speech.
| - | The Question – Spotlight: Bumblebee | March 6, 2013 | — |
Writer: John Barber; Artist: David Daza; Bumblebee commands a small group of Autobots operating out of Omega Supreme searching for missing Decepticons on Earth, but his leadership is questioned at every turn by Prowl, who takes Groove and Streetwise with him on his own mission. Hot Spot attempts to cheer him up with little success, so Bumblebee attempts to seek advice from Thundercracker, but the ex-Decepticon is not interested in leading anyone. However, Bumblebee and Thundercracker both realize during their conversation that Megatron, whose new body contains space bridge technology derived from Metroplex, allowed himself to be captured and returned to Cybertron so he could freely teleport the remaining Decepticons home. Thundercracker provides Bumblebee with the space bridge's radiation frequency, who tracks the signal to a space bridge terminal within a secret Decepticon encampment. Upon being discovered, Starscream orders the Stunticons to destroy Bumblebee while the other Decepticons pass through the space bridge, but Bumblebee destroys the terminal and incapacitates them. The next morning, Bumblebee hauls his prisoners back to Omega Supreme and orders the Autobots to depart for Cybertron, impressing Prowl.
| - | The Reluctant Specialist – Spotlight: Trailcutter | April 3, 2013 | — |
Writer: James Roberts; Artist: Matt Frank; Brainstorm, Chromedome, Highbrow, and Trailbreaker successfully repair hull damage to the exploration vessel Lost Light when it collides with space debris, but the ship's captain Rodimus passes the latter over in a subsequent awards ceremony. A drunk Trailbreaker later vents his displeasure to Whirl in Swerve's bar; when Whirl asks Rodimus why Trailbreaker was snubbed, Rodimus informs him that his forcefield generation is unworthy of recognition as it is just part of his identity. Whirl resolves to help Trailbreaker reinvent himself, suggesting he change his name to "Trailcutter" and acquire a signature weapon from Brainstorm, but the Lost Light’s crew upset him further by referring to him only as the resident forcefield maker. Trailcutter angrily goes to sleep but awakens to find that the entire crew has been frozen in stasis, Decepticons have boarded the ship, and his forcefields refuse to work. After dispatching Chop Shop and Venom inside the medical bay, Trailcutter confronts the Decepticon commander Lockdown, who explains that he and his crew are Titan hunters after the space debris, revealed to be Metroplex's thumb. Trailcutter intimidates the Decepticons into retreating using equipment from Brainstorm's laboratory and later explains the full story to his roommate Hoist: the ship-wide stasis was caused by one of Brainstorm's malfunctioning inventions, and Trailcutter was protected by his forcefield generator activating in his sleep, which burnt out shortly before he awoke. He proudly shows off the award Rodimus gave him for his actions, but Hoist spoils his good mood by revealing the massive crests Rodimus bestowed upon the rest of the crew for "exceptional endurance in the face of adversity."
| - | The Waiting Game – Spotlight: Hoist | May 1, 2013 | — |
Writer: James Roberts; Artist: Agustin Padilla; Hoist, Swerve, Perceptor, Sunstreaker, and his pet Insecticon Bob crashland near an abandoned Decepticon outpost. Perceptor's legs are fused to the upside-down ceiling during the crash, and Hoist activates a six-hour cloaking shield after finding Tarn of the Decepticon Justice Division waiting outside the shuttle. To pass the time, Swerve talks about various menial topics, such as his greatest fears (including a hypothetical combination of Megatron, Shockwave, Sixshot, and Overlord), near-death experiences, Bob's origins, and insulting Sunstreaker, but Hoist soon realizes that Swerve is hiding a potentially fatal injury with his chatter; he and Sunstreaker resolve to confront Tarn and search for medical supplies. Tarn quickly incapacitates Sunstreaker, but Hoist is instead met by Megatron, Shockwave, Sixshot, and Overlord, who merge into one gigantic monstrosity. The invincible monster vanishes as quickly as it appeared, and Perceptor finally realizes what is happening: the Galactic Council installed a phobia shield on the planet to deter Cybertronians, bringing the worst fears of its target to life. After losing contact with the now-unconscious Swerve, the shield targets Bob, and the Autobots barely manage to escape the shuttle before it is destroyed by an illusory Metroplex's foot. Hoist reluctantly knocks Perceptor, Bob, and Sunstreaker unconscious to prevent more deadly phobias from spawning and settles in to wait for help as his worst fear comes true – the fear of being stranded alone.

== Continuity ==
Shockwave was a prequel to The Transformers: Infiltration (January–June 2006) and Stormbringer (July–October 2006). It explains the source of the Energon used in both stories, the former being the one Starscream empowers himself with, and the latter being used by Bludgeon to resurrect Thunderwing. It also shows Bludgeon possessing Shockwave's laboratory which he later uses to find the Ultra Energon to re-power Thunderwing, as shown in Soundwave. Most of the Spotlights were all touched upon in Escalation (November 2006–April 2007): Scorponok was hinted to be working on the same process with the human organization the Machination, and Laserbeak and Ravage are shown as captives of Skywatch. Sixshot and the Reapers appear in Devastation (October 2007–February 2008), having been summoned by Megatron.

Nightbeat, Galvatron and Optimus Prime touched upon the Dead Universe storyline, which is to be a major focus of The Transformers: Revelation. Thunderwing is killed at the conclusion of Stormbringer, when his corpse is taken in Galvatron, and Optimus Prime is set after Escalation, where he had a vision after being beaten unconscious by Megatron. Ramjet was introduced in the New Avengers/Transformers crossover with his Spotlight taking place concurrently with Escalation. Arcee takes place concurrently with issue 5 of The Transformers: Devastation, with Prime pulling the Autobots from Earth as a direct result of what happened in that issue. Arcee also acts as a sequel to Optimus Prime, picking up on many themes introduced in that story, such as the fate of the Monster Pretenders and the introduction of Jhiaxus. Grimlock follows up on both Grimlock being recovered by Skywatch and the Machination plotline in Devastation, as well as acting as a sequel of sorts to Shockwave.

The issues focusing on Cyclonus, Hardhead, Doubledealer and Sideswipe were four interrelated issues which comprise The Transformers: Revelation, which was a direct continuation story from The Transformers: Devastation.

Drift and Metroplex are prelude stories to All Hail Megatron.
