= Transformers: Last Bot Standing =

Comic book series

- Cover A for issue #1 by Nick Roche.

Publication information
- Publisher: IDW Publishing (licensed by Hasbro)
- Format: Limited series
- Genre: Science fiction; Western
- Publication date: May 11 – August 31, 2022
- No. of issues: 4

Creative team
- Written by: Nick Roche
- Pencillers: Nick Roche; E. J. Su
- Letterer: Johanna Nattalie
- Colorists: Rebecca Nalty; Brittany Peer
- Editors: David Mariotte; Riley Farmer

Transformers: Last Bot Standing is an American comic book limited series written by Nick Roche, drawn by Roche and E. J. Su, and colored by Rebecca Nalty and Brittany Peer, and was published by IDW Publishing in 2022.

Based on the Transformers franchise by Hasbro and Takara-Tomy, the series is one of the last projects presented by IDW before the publisher passed the Transformers comic book license back to Hasbro at the end of the year 2022.

The series debuted on May 11, 2022, and concluded on August 31, 2022.

== Premise ==
In a distant future, the war between Autobots and Decepticons on Cybertron is over, but all Transformers are nearly extinct. Rodimus is the last surviving Cybertronian, and is haunted by the sins of its species. He spends his final days in Donnokt, a planet on the verge of collapse after industrialisation.

== Publication history ==
Transformers: Last Bot Standing was announced in February 2022, written by Nick Roche (writer of The Transformers: Last Stand of the Wreckers, Transformers: Sins of the Wreckers and Transformers: Requiem of the Wreckers), drawn by E. J. Su (artist of The Transformers: Infiltration, The Transformers: Escalation, The Transformers: Devastation and The Transformers: Revelation), and colored by Rebecca Nalty. The series was released in May 2022 by IDW Publishing.

The series is one of the last projects presented by IDW before the publisher passed the Transformers comic book license back to Hasbro at the end of 2022.

Roche said, "the last remaining Cybertronian, stalked by the sins of their entire race, must save the world one final time. In a way, Last Bot Standing is a proper farewell, as our creative team bows out of IDW's Transformers universe in the most explosive and apocalyptic way imaginable. To have E.J. Su, the visual architect of IDW's definitive Transformers run, be the one to depict 'The End of All Things' (with colors from the astounding Rebecca Nalty) is the most perfect and bittersweet piece of artistic casting I could think of."

Su said, "the Transformers franchise has come a long way since we laid our eyes on the first episode of the cartoon, and it's amazing how many writers can put so many different spins on the core characters. Nick has masterfully crafted some of the most memorable Transformers comic stories, and this one will be no exception as the readers weave their way through the mystery and find out how our beloved characters came to this situation. We hope that they enjoy it as much as we have enjoyed making it."

IDW editor David Mariotte said, "like Teenage Mutant Ninja Turtles: The Last Ronin, Last Bot Standing is one of those great stories where defining creators come together to tell one incredible version of an ending, a hypothetical last story for our beloved heroes and villains. We're so excited to have two of the first IDW Transformers creators return to tell a story unlike literally any Transformers story you've ever seen or we've ever done."

== Issues ==
Issue	Written by	Drawn by	Colored by	Publication date
#1	Nick Roche	Nick Roche and E. J. Su	Rebecca Nalty	May 11, 2022
In the planet Donnokt, the native society goes through a process of industrialisation. Among the people from the town of Fembrance, Shib Walkis is a delivery woman who remains skeptical of this change. One night, Shib is asked by the sheriff to rescue a group of wounded miners trapped up in the mountains where they work. At the same time, Nitro, a mysterious "Visitor" appears in front of the crowd, while Shib's cart transforms into Rodimus, who brutally kills Nitro, despite the latter shows no hostility. Rodimus is revealed to be dealing with post-traumatic stress disorder after the war on Cybertron. Meanwhile, another Visitor arrives at Donnokt.
#2	Nick Roche	Nick Roche and E. J. Su	Rebecca Nalty	June 8, 2022
Shib goes to meet Rodimus at night, when Sheriff Errold Alderman orders him to be detained until sunset. Meanwhile, the others Visitors walk among the planet, like Officer Moon, who responds to Commander Steeljaw. Two of Steeljaw's henchmen go to rescue Rodimus, who was tied up and watched over by Alderman's men, and bring him to Steeljaw. He has a plan to turn the Fembrance citizens into biofuel in order for him and his Cybertonians to survive. To Rodimus' shock, Moon has captured Shib as hostage.
#3	Nick Roche	Nick Roche and E. J. Su	Rebecca Nalty	July 13, 2022
After being released, Shib uses a secret energon tube on Rodimus, healing him completely. During the fight, Moon sacrifices herself to protect Shib, allowing her and Rodimus to escape back to Fembrace. After destroying the Walkis' house to retrieve the missing relics, including an ancient Cybertronian device, Steeljaw's team deduces Rodimus killed Nitro.
#4	Nick Roche	Nick Roche and E. J. Su	Rebecca Nalty and Brittany Peer	August 31, 2022
Rodimus' device shows a recording about Donnokt being filled with unstable energon, so he decided to keep from other Transformers to prevent the planet's destruction. In the last battle against Steeljaw, Rodimus and his team fight over the last two energon keys in order to free Trayvon and Beets, Shib's brothers, and the other prisoners. While the second energon key is destroyed, Shib takes the third one before escaping with the others. Within the energon mine, Steeljaw decides to destroy the planet by shooting at it, but Rodimus interferes. Steeljaw drops him to the mine, causing him to increases his powers. When Steeljaw is about kill Shib, Rodimus kills him in time to save her. In his last moments, Rodimus built a special pod to depart from Donnokt, but not before helping Shib and the other citizens to use the energon mine to increase Fembrance's industrialisation.

== Reception ==
Issue	Publication date	Critic rating	Critic reviews	Ref.
#1	May 11, 2022	8.0/10	5	
#2	June 8, 2022	8.0/10	1	
#3	July 13, 2022	8.0/10	1	
#4	August 31, 2022	8.0/10	1	
Overall		8.0/10	8	

== Collected editions ==
Title	Material collected	Pages	Publication date	ISBN
Transformers: Last Bot Standing	Transformers: Last Bot Standing #1–4	136	October 25, 2022	1684059402, 978-1684059409
