= The Transformers: Revelation =

Comic book miniseries

Publication information
- Publisher: IDW Publishing
- Schedule: Monthly
- Format: Miniseries
- No. of issues: 4
- Main character(s): Autobots, Decepticons

Creative team
- Created by: Hasbro
- Written by: Simon Furman
- Artist(s): E. J. Su, Nick Roche, Dan Khanna

The Transformers: Revelation is a comic book miniseries, published by IDW Publishing, based on the Generation One Transformers and following on from The Transformers: Devastation. Unlike previous IDW G1 titles, which were 6 issues each, Revelation consists of four interrelated The Transformers: Spotlight issues focused on Cyclonus, Hardhead, Doubledealer, and Sideswipe respectively.

== Plot ==
=== Spotlight: Cyclonus ===
Returning to Cybertron on a mission from Nemesis Prime, Cyclonus becomes enraged at the annihilation of his homeworld and takes out his anger on the nearest target - Hound's unit, en route to Garrus-9 and already dealing with their own problems in the shape of the rebellious Sideswipe. They cannot kill him due to his undead nature, but he is driven off by Ultra Magnus' intervention. Cyclonus flees to carry out his true task of activating the Nega-Core and reluctantly awakening its guardian. Followed and attacked by Hound's unit and Magnus, he has no choice but to call on the guardian - Thunderwing, who forces the Autobots to flee. Elsewhere, Optimus Prime calls in the Wreckers to deal with the escalating situation, as Arcee tortures a Decepticon captive for information on Monstructor, and the Dead Universe crew prepare for the transition to the real universe.

=== Spotlight: Hardhead ===
Realizing someone has tampered with his memories, Nightbeat asks Hardhead to accompany him to Gorlam Prime, and eliminate him if he becomes a threat. Setting off for the original excavation site they are quickly attacked by a horde of Micromasters who ignore Nightbeat. On Corata-Vaz the Wrecker assault on Thunderwing fails, while a watching Prime has his suspicions about Nova's involvement confirmed by Omega Supreme. Nightbeat is taken control of again by Jhiaxus, who admits they have engineered the population in order to withstand the Dead Universe and plan to merge the two universes - with the Dead Universe crew in charge. Hardhead escapes, discovering the dimensional portal, and then eliminates Nightbeat as asked before being swallowed by the portal. A furious Nemesis Prime now realizes he has to undertake Nightbeat's original purpose himself - the elimination of Optimus Prime. Arcee makes a deal with Banzai-Tron to track down the escaped Monstructor while Jetfire, realizing that they cannot survive the Dead Universe, "volunteers" Cloudburst's crew for an experiment. Dealer (in reality a Decepticon agent) suggests to a dubious Prime about using the Magnificence to see what is going to happen.

=== Spotlight: Doubledealer ===
As the situation worsens, Dealer travels to Earth and convinces Hot Rod to bring the Magnificence to Prime - all the while still plotting to take it for himself. In China, Straxus and Grindcore set up a Space Bridge, hoping to use Earth's Energon to power the Expansion. Cloudburst's vessel comes under attack from Cyclonus as Nemesis Prime attacks Garrus-9 in an effort to eliminate Optimus, with the later Prime seemingly losing. On Ki-Aleta, an increasingly suspicious Hot Rod reveals he had the Magnificence hidden on the planet all along and uses it to reveal Dealer's treachery, promptly killing him. The Magnificence reveals the location and purpose of the other Nega-Cores and their guardians (Monstructor and Sixshot). Jetfire realizes that they can override Jhiaxus' control of the guardians via their mental link to him. Jhiaxus, however, has anticipated this and activates his backup guardian - Bludgeon.

=== Spotlight: Sideswipe ===
On Earth, Sideswipe and his unit engage Straxus and Grindcore, with Sideswipe trying to step out of his partner Sunstreaker's shadow by finding and rescuing him. As Sideswipe suicidally takes them on, the others use the Space Bridge to travel to the locations of the Nega-Cores. Cloudburst's ship is destroyed, but he and his crew fight back using Jetfire's latest invention - the Autobot equivalent of Thunderwing's shell. Jetfire freezes the guardians long enough for the Autobots to make it safely past, but is attacked by the Jhiaxus controlled Bludgeon. Optimus fights back against Nemesis Prime as the Darkness that powers him attempts to transition to Optimus. Nemesis is shot in the back by Galvatron. As Galvatron realizes his destiny and absorbs the Darkness, Optimus throws him into a solar pool, seemingly destroying him. The Autobot teams throw the Nega-Cores into the Dead Universe, where Cloudburst's team allows them to go off harmlessly, closing the Benzuli expanse. Sideswipe survives on Earth, and finds that he has proved something to himself without having to find Sunstreaker. On Gorlam Prime, Jhiaxus is confronted by Arcee and Hardhead, the latter now like the Dead Universe crew. Arcee finally gets her revenge, killing the undead Jhiaxus over and over. Gorlam Prime eventually evolves into a new Cybertron, and its inhabitants into beings like Transformers. However, on Garrus-9 Galvatron survives within the solar pool.

== Publication ==
Revelation was written by Simon Furman, who has written most of IDW's Transformers series. The first issue of the four, Cyclonus, was published in June 2008, with art by The Transformers: Devastation artist E. J. Su. Nick Roche provided alternative covers, as well as interior art for the Hardhead issue. Longtime Hasbro Transformers Collectors Club artist Dan Khanna provided art for the Doubledealer issue. Su returned for art on the final issue, in addition to coloring it himself.
