= New Avengers/Transformers =

2007 crossover comic series

- Cover art for New Avengers/Transformers #1. Art by Jim Cheung.

Publication information
- Publisher: Marvel Comics; IDW Publishing
- Schedule: Monthly
- Format: Limited series
- Genre: Superhero
- Publication date: July – October 2007
- No. of issues: 4
- Main character(s): New Avengers; Transformers

Creative team
- Created by: Stan Lee, Jack Kirby, Steve Ditko, Joe Simon, Len Wein, Herb Trimpe, Larry Lieber, Don Heck, Archie Goodwin, John Romita, Sr., Roy Thomas; Hasbro; Takara Tomy
- Written by: Stuart Moore
- Artist: Tyler Kirkham

New Avengers/Transformers is an intercompany crossover comic book series published by Marvel Comics and IDW Publishing that involves the pre-Civil War New Avengers and the Transformers. It is set in the fictional nation of Latveria, and involves the characters Captain America, Spider-Man, Iron Man, Luke Cage, Wolverine, Falcon and Ms. Marvel from the Avengers, and Prowl, Ratchet, Jazz, Bumblebee and Optimus Prime from the Autobots. It was written by Stuart Moore, penciled by Tyler Kirkham, and premiered on July 5, 2007. The tag line for the series is "Assemble and Roll Out!"

According to information currently available, the storyline takes place between the first story arc The Transformers: Infiltration and the second arc The Transformers: Escalation for the IDW Transformers series, and between the Breakout and Sentry arcs for New Avengers. Writer Stuart Moore has indicated that it takes place in the regular Marvel continuity between the first two-story arcs of New Avengers, and it is currently held as semi-continuity for IDW, which entails that, although it will not have any effect on the overall storyline of Transformers, it will not contradict it either.

This is Spider-Man's second appearance alongside the Transformers, as he appeared in the third issue of the original Marvel Transformers comic in 1984. However, this will not have any bearing, as the bio for Death's Head in the third issue of the All-New Official Handbook of the Marvel Universe A–Z (released on March 22, 2006) indicated that all previous encounters with the Transformers took place in an alternate universe, thus separating these stories from existence in standard Marvel Universe continuity.

== Plot ==
A war is looming between the neighboring Eastern European states of Latveria and Symkaria. Called in by S.H.I.E.L.D., Captain America, Spider-Man, Wolverine and Luke Cage investigate. Discovering a non-human structure and an army of destroyed Doombots, they attempt to force their way inside, only to be met with deadly attacks. Spider-Man is captured as the others force their way out, with the team beginning to fight among themselves. An observing Optimus Prime decides to take the Autobots to counter the threat, as Megatron reveals to a captured Spider-Man that one of Doom's devices is responsible for the tensions, and they prepare to experiment on his mutated DNA. Falcon and Ms. Marvel arrive, followed by the Autobots. Prime's order for them to leave is met by a full attack by the Avengers.

As the fight continues, with Ms. Marvel and Wolverine in particular appearing highly vicious against their opponents, Doctor Doom intervenes and places a device on Captain America's neck that instantly calms him down. After he manages to talk down Ms. Marvel and Wolverine, the rest of the team talk to the Autobots, and Doom reveals that the Avengers' heightened aggression was caused by a device he developed which was stolen by the Decepticons. Doom departs to attempt to reach a diplomatic solution to the conflict with Symkaria, leaving the Autobots and the Avengers to storm the Decepticon base to rescue Spider-Man. However, Megatron has already determined that the mutated elements of Spider-Man's blood will enable him to enhance his forces' power to a level that not even Energon has accomplished, the enhanced firepower knocking out Optimus Prime just as Iron Man arrives on the scene. Iron Man, in new, Transformer-sized armor, helped to turn the tide against the Decepticons, allowing Prowl, Ratchet, Luke Cage and Wolverine to get inside the ship and rescue Spider-Man.

As Iron Man and Megatron face off outside the base, the Autobots track down Spider-Man, subsequently freeing him with the aid of Doctor Doom (who has turned on the Decepticons after they betrayed him). Realizing that the Decepticons are too powerful to take on as they are, the Autobots ask for Spider-Man and Wolverine's permission to use the same energy-enhancement method that the Decepticons used, taking blood samples from the two and using it to enhance their own abilities, and the two heroes agree to the procedure. While Spider-Man joins the Autobots outside the ship, Wolverine and Doctor Doom track down the device that initially amplified the Avengers' aggression and Wolverine destroys it, leaving Doom to make his own way out as he rejoins his teammates. Although Iron Man's Transformer armor is destroyed after it suffers an overload while fighting Megatron, the Autobots are still able to turn the tide, thanks to their power boost Spider-Man and Luke Cage knocking down Megatron and forcing him to flee. With the other Decepticons and the Autobots subsequently departing themselves, the Avengers are left to report to the government about the situation. Meanwhile, the Autobots reports that Ramjet has gone to Earth and it is implied that he has taken the form of the Avengers Quinjet.
