= The Transformers: Devastation =

- Cover A of the first issue

Publication information
- Publisher: IDW Publishing
- Schedule: Monthly
- Format: Miniseries
- Publication date: October 3, 2007–February 2008
- No. of issues: 6
- Main character(s): Autobots, Decepticons

Creative team
- Created by: Hasbro
- Written by: Simon Furman
- Artist(s): E. J. Su, Nick Roche, Robby Musso

The Transformers: Devastation is a six-issue comic book miniseries, published by IDW Publishing, based on the Transformers and following on from The Transformers: Escalation. Issue 1 of Devastation was released on October 3, 2007, with issue 2 following on the 24th of October and was published monthly until February 2008. A follow-up entitled The Transformers: Revelation then followed. The series is available in The Transformers: Volume 3.

== Plot ==
No.	Title	Release date	ISBN
01	The Transformers: Devastation #1	October 3rd, 2007	—
Artist: E.J. Su; While examining the computer that Verity Carlo stole from the Machination agent Stoker, Nightbeat discovers a tracking device inside and sends Bumblebee to confirm that the Ark-19 is surrounded by surveillance equipment. Nightbeat and Optimus Prime decide to relocate their base, while Hot Rod and Wheeljack are informed that Ironhide's deactivated alternate mode is scheduled to be crushed in a compactor. Elsewhere, Megatron orders Sixshot to destroy the Autobots; although Sixshot and the other Decepticons worry for their leader's sanity, they refuse to question him, but Astrotrain and Blitzwing plan to revive Starscream. As Skywatch plans to send the reprogrammed Ravage to hunt down the other Decepticons, Optimus assigns Hound's unit to join him on Earth and tasks Jetfire with dismantling Bludgeon's operations on Cybertron; the Autobots attempt to move the Ark-19 to the Gulf of Mexico, but Sixshot shoots the ship down over Knoxville, Tennessee.
02	The Transformers: Devastation #2	October 24th, 2007	—
Artist: E.J. Su; Hot Rod and Wheeljack's attempt to rescue Ironhide is interrupted by an attack from several clones of the missing Sunstreaker; the Autobots disable several of the clones but are shocked when both the clones and their heads possess the ability to transform. As the Ark-19 crashes, just barely missing the residential community of Knoxville, Ratchet, Verity Carlo, and Jimmy Pink flee in an escape pod while Optimus transfers the ship's data to the Ark-32 and activates its self-destruct. Sixshot confirms the ship's destruction to Megatron, who orders any survivors killed. Starscream awakens under Blitzwing's supervision as Abraham Dante of the Machination observes Hunter O'Nion's inert form; Hunter, who resisted the organization's brainwashing, escapes and discovers Sunstreaker's gutted and disembodied head, who begs Hunter to kill him.
03	The Transformers: Devastation #3	November 28th, 2007	—
Artist: E.J. Su; The Pentagon locks down all U.S. air traffic in the wake of the Ark-19’s crash as Ratchet, Verity, and Jimmy emerge from the escape pod in Wicksburg, Alabama. Sixshot quickly finds them and opens fire as Hot Rod and Wheeljack disable the Machination Headmasters and continue searching for Ironhide. Sunstreaker tells Hunter that the Machination is forcing him to control the clones and that Hunter himself has been upgraded into a Headmaster, again asking to be killed to deactivate the clones, but Hunter instead requests to bond with Sunstreaker. The United States Air Force attacks Sixshot and allows Ratchet and the humans to hide in a Florida ambulance lot, but Sixshot tracks them down again; the other Autobots arrive just as Sixshot catches Ratchet, while the Reapers plot to destroy Earth and Nemesis Prime orders Galvatron to leave the Dead Universe and travel to Earth at once.
04	The Transformers: Devastation #4	January 16th, 2008	—
Artist: E.J. Su; As Skywatch struggles to keep Ravage and Laserbeak under their control due to a countersignal from their true master Soundwave, who is trapped in his alternate tape deck form, the battle between Sixshot and the Autobots rages on. The military sends a bomber to destroy everyone involved while Hot Rod and Wheeljack finally lose the Sunstreaker clones and reach the impound lot where Ironhide is scheduled to be destroyed. Inside the Machination headquarters in Tampa, Florida, Hunter and Sunstreaker begin the mental bonding process as Verity and Jimmy warn the battered Autobots about the imminent bombing run. The Reapers attack the Decepticon Command Bunker in Oregon and force Megatron to recall Sixshot. Nightbeat teleports the Autobots aboard the Ark-32 just before the military attacks, and the fully functional Starscream declares he is ready for action.
05	The Transformers: Devastation #5	February 6th, 2008	—
Artist: E.J. Su; Although Blitzwing tries to buy Starscream and Astrotrain more time even as the Reapers lay siege to the Decepticon base, Megatron is not impressed with his efforts. Sixshot arrives and draws the Reapers' ire, while Ratchet hurriedly works to revive Verity and Jimmy, who did not survive the sudden teleportation to the Ark-32. The Sunstreaker clones ambush Wheeljack in the junkyard but are taken out by Hot Rod, and Hunter successfully engages the Headmaster process and prepares to hijack one of the Machination's ready-made bodies. The Reapers once again offer Sixshot a place with them, and the Decepticon superwarrior decides to join them once Starscream emerges from the bunker; however, Starscream activates an embedded failsafe within Sixshot and knocks him into stasis. Although Megatron is furious at his troops for reviving Starscream behind his back, he decides to deal with that later and presses the advantage against the Reapers. Optimus informs Prowl that he is leaving Earth, as a break-in on the maximum security prison world of Garrus 9 is more important, and a Skywatch official orders that the most advanced of the "Eureka Six" Transformers be brought online – a massive robot resembling a Tyrannosaurus rex.
06	The Transformers: Devastation #6	February 27th, 2008	—
Artist: E.J. Su; In the Machination headquarters, Abraham Dante prepares to undergo the Headmaster process for his heavily damaged Transformer associate, revealed to be Scorponok. Although interference from Machination scientists hinder Hunter's Headmaster transformation, he manages to bond with Sunstreaker and escape just as Scorponok bursts through the wall. The Decepticons are heavily outnumbered by the Reapers and lose Runabout and Runamuck; Galvatron decides to help them and corrupts the lead Reaper with the essence of the Dead Universe, giving Megatron's forces the edge needed to triumph. Hot Rod and Hardhead destroy the Sunstreaker clones, though the former decides to stay on Earth and continue searching for Sunstreaker; Hardhead, Wheeljack, and Ironhide return to the Ark-32, where Nightbeat also leaves the ship to investigate a strange death and the stranger gaps in his memory. As the Autobots depart Earth, Skywatch loses Ravage and Laserbeak and fails to activate Grimlock in time, while Galvatron returns to the Dead Universe; although Nemesis Prime congratulates him on a job well done, he privately confers with Jhiaxus about his suspicions regarding Galvatron's true motives.

=== Notes ===
As with Escalation, Devastation picks up on several other plot threads introduced in other IDW G1 stories.

==== In relation to The Transformers: Spotlight ====
- Scorponok, here revealed as the "Head" of the Machination, was introduced in Spotlight: Ultra Magnus. Likewise, the concept of "transformable men" was also introduced in that story, which here evolves into the Headmaster process.
- Soundwave was trapped in his alt-mode by Bludgeon in Spotlight: Soundwave. This is his first in-continuity appearance since.
- The story of Sixshot and the Reapers was first explored in Spotlight: Sixshot.
- The Dead Universe storyline has been referred to Spotlight one-shots focusing on Nightbeat, Galvatron, Optimus Prime, and Arcee. Nightbeat had his memory tampered with in his own Spotlight and was asked to investigate Leadfoot's death in Galvatron. Nova/Nemesis Prime's background was detailed in Optimus Prime, as was that of Jhiaxus.
- Dealer/Doubledealer was introduced in Spotlight: Hot Rod as a Decepticon spy tasked to retrieve a powerful object called the Magnificence from Hot Rod.
- The events that cause Prime to pull out of Earth are detailed in Spotlight: Arcee, where the Decepticons take the Monstructor components from Garrus-9.

==== In relation to The Transformers: Escalation ====
- The Dinobots and Shockwave were taken by Skywatch in issue 5 of Escalation and are still being excavated as Grimlock is reactivated here.
- Sunstreaker and Hunter were abducted by the Machination in issue 1 of Escalation, but their overall fate was not expanded on until Devastation.

==== In relation to The Transformers: Infiltration ====
- In issue 1, Nightbeat explains the events of the first three issues of Infiltration as a plot by the Machination to acquire a Transformer, locating them via a homing device in the computer from that story.
- Starscream's return here marks his first appearance since issue 6 of Infiltration, where he was blown almost in half after a failed power play against Megatron.
