= Transformers (comics) =

Comics

Publication information
- Publisher: Marvel Comics (1984–1994); Dreamwave Productions (2002–2004); IDW Publishing (2005–2022); Skybound Entertainment / Image Comics (2023–present)

There have been four main publishers of the comic book series bearing the name Transformers based on the toy lines of the same name. The first series was produced by Marvel Comics from 1984 to 1991, which ran for 80 issues and produced four spin-off miniseries. This was followed by a second volume titled Transformers: Generation 2, which ran for 12 issues starting in 1993. The second major series was produced by Dreamwave Productions from 2002 to 2004 with multiple limited series as well, and within multiple story continuities, until the company became bankrupt in 2005. The third and fourth series have been published by IDW Publishing with the third series starting with an issue #0 in October 2005 and a regular series starting in January 2006 to November 2018. The fourth series started in March 2019 with issue #1 and concluded in June 2022. There are also several limited series being produced by IDW as well. Skybound Entertainment began publishing Transformers comics starting in June 2023, kicking off the Energon Universe. In addition to these four main publishers, there have also been several other smaller publishers with varying degrees of success.

== Overview ==
No.	Title	Issues	Publication date	
No.	Title	Issues	First published	Last published
Marvel Comics continuity
1	The Transformers	80	September 1984	July 1991
2	The Transformers UK	332	September 1984	January 1992
3	G.I. Joe and the Transformers	4	January 1987	April 1987
4	The Transformers: Headmasters	4	July 1987	January 1988
5	Transformers: Generation 2	12	November 1993	October 1994
6	The Transformers: Regeneration One	20	July 2012	March 2014
7	Transformers '84: Secrets & Lies	4	August 2019	October 2020
3H Enterprises Beast Wars comics
8	Tales from the Beast Wars	2	July 1997	July 2000
9	Transformers: The Wreckers	3	July 2001	July 2004
10	Transformers: Universe	3	August 2003	June 2004
Dreamwave Generation One comics continuity
11	Transformers: Generation One	26	April 2002	December 2004
12	Transformers: The War Within	15	October 2002	December 2003
13	Transformers: Micromasters	4	June 2004	September 2004
Dreamwave Unicron Trilogy comics
14	Transformers: Armada	18	July 2002	December 2003
15	Transformers: Energon	12	January 2004	December 2004
16	IDW 2005 comics continuity	427	October 2005	November 2018
IDW Beast Wars comics
17	Beast Wars: The Gathering	4	February 2006	May 2006
18	Beast Wars: The Ascending	4	October 2007	January 2008
19	Transformers: Beast Wars	18	February 2021	June 2022
20	The Transformers: Hearts of Steel	4	June 2006	September 2006
21	IDW movie comics	59	February 2007	August 2011
22	Transformers (Titan)	75	July 2007	September 2014
23	Transformers Animated: The Arrival	6	August 2008	December 2008
24	IDW Aligned Continuity comics	21	June 2010	December 2015
IDW crossover comics
25	Transformers vs. G.I. Joe	13	July 2014	June 2016
26	Star Trek vs. Transformers	5	September 2018	February 2019
27	Transformers/Ghostbusters	5	June 2019	October 2019
28	Transformers vs. The Terminator	4	March 2020	September 2020
29	My Little Pony/Transformers	8	August 2020	July 2021
30	Transformers/Back to the Future	4	October 2020	May 2021
IDW 2019 comics continuity
31	Transformers	35	March 2019	June 2022
32	Transformers: Galaxies	12	September 2019	December 2020
33	Transformers: Escape	5	December 2020	July 2021
34	Wreckers: Tread & Circuits	4	October 2021	January 2022
35	Transformers: War's End	4	February 2022	May 2022
36	Transformers: King Grimlock	5	August 2021	February 2022
37	Transformers: Shattered Glass	10	August 2021	December 2022
38	Transformers: Last Bot Standing	4	May 2022	August 2022
Energon Universe (Skybound Entertainment)
39	Transformers	37	October 2023	TBA
Total		1258	September 1984	Present

== Marvel Comics ==
=== The Transformers (Generation 1), Marvel, U.S. ===
The cover of issue #3 shows that the original mini-series was in the same continuity as Marvel's Earth-616. This was soon forgotten, with hardly any references to non-Transformers continuities left.

The Transformers comic by Marvel was the first and arguably the best known Transformers comic. Although it was originally intended to be a 4-issue limited series, it expanded into an ongoing series, which ran for 80 issues before being cancelled. The final cover read "80 in a 4 issue limited series". Issues #5–15, 17–32, 35–42 and 44–56 were written by Bob Budiansky, with Marvel UK writer Simon Furman taking over for the remainder of the comic. The comic did not attempt to follow the show and some elements and characters were completely absent, including Ultra Magnus, Springer, Arcee, and Metroplex. The comic started much the same as the show; a crew crash landing the Ark on Earth in the distant past. They are befriended by Buster Witwicky. His brother Spike eventually joins the cause as Autobot leader when he became the head of commander Fortress Maximus. There occurs a considerable amount of fractioning and in-fighting in both the Autobots and Decepticons. However, the series climax occurs when both sides, Autobots and Decepticons, form an uneasy peace to defend Cybertron from Unicron.

A few of the early issues were reprinted by Marvel in a digest sized magazine called The Transformers Comics Magazine that ran 10 issues from 1987 to 1988. Marvel had also reprinted some of these early issues in 1985, as the Transformers Collected Comics which ran 2 issues.

In latter years, when various other companies were able to obtain the license for the Transformers, they were able to gain access to the Marvel series and reprinted a lot of the issues. From 2001 to 2003, Titan Books reprinted numerous Marvel issues in a series of 14 trade paperbacks. Years later they were able to do more reprints but only in the U.K. market.

IDW Publishing reprinted numerous Marvel issues as well, as part of the Transformers: Generations series that ran 12 issues and a collected trade paperback from 2006 to 2007. Issues were also reprinted in The Transformers Magazine, that ran four issues in 2007, while other collections were published in 2008 and 2009. IDW began publishing another new series of reprints called Transformers Classics. This six volume series started getting published in June 2011. Meanwhile, a 100 Penny Press: Transformers Classics #1 mini edition was also published in June 2011. Some issues were also reprinted in the hardcover book Transformers: The Best Of Simon Furman in July 2007. In March 2014, the first issue of the series was reprinted as 100 Penny Press: Transformers #1

In July 2012, to prepare the new series Transformers: Regeneration One (which continued the Marvel series after 21 years), IDW Publishing released Transformers: Regeneration One 100-Page Spectacular. This one-shot reprinted issues 76–80 of the Marvel series.

In August 2013, IDW published the hardcover Transformers: 30th Anniversary Collection. This deluxe book celebrated the 30th anniversary of The Transformers franchise, and as such, many of the original Marvel books were reprinted.

==== Marvel UK ====
Dinobots leader Grimlock battles Decepticon Shockwave. From issue #262 of the Transformers comic published by Marvel UK.

The sister title in the UK, this series ran for 332 issues, as well as spawning 7 annuals and 28 specials. It was a weekly publication that spliced original stories into the continuity of the reprinted US issues, and was mostly written by Simon Furman. At the start, it had a more serious science fiction approach. Because of the weekly approach, the UK comic was able to flesh out characters and ideas more; in the US comic, the Aerialbots and Stunticons are first shown having just been built and being given life by the Creation Matrix program, whereas the UK comic fleshed it out more and showed the two teams as being created out of new technology created by Shockwave after scanning Buster Witwicky while he had the Matrix downloaded into his brain. Furman also tried to maintain continuity with The Transformers: The Movie, and wrote several stories set in the future after the movie's ending, as well as bringing characters from the future (i.e. Galvatron) into the present day. Due to his epic and mythological approach, he was highly praised and succeeded Bob Budiansky on the US title at issue 56. The mythic tone continued to influence Furman's work on the Dreamwave and IDW comics.

Numerous issues and stories from this series would eventually be reprinted. Marvel UK themselves would reprint some stories in Transformers-The Complete Works Part 1 and Part 2, Plague of the Insecticons and The Transformers Universe Vol. One.

In latter years reprints were done courtesy of Titan Books who published reprints in 14 volumes.

When IDW Publishing acquired the licence to the property, they published various reprints in the hardcover book The Best Of Simon Furman and in the Best of UK Omnibus. Other reprints were featured in mini-series collections such as Target 2006 (#1–5), Dinobots (#1–6), Space Pirates (#1–5), Time Wars (#1–5), City of Fear (#1–5), and Prey (#1–5). A new 8 volume reprint collection called Transformers Classics: UK started getting released in October 2011.

=== The Transformers: The Movie, Marvel, U.S., 1986 ===
A three-issue mini-series adaptation of the feature film, with no continuity ties to the regular comic series. Differences to the animated feature include the original designs for the Autobot Matrix of Leadership and Ultra Magnus' original death at the hand of Scourge and his Sweeps.

=== Transformers Universe, Marvel, U.S., 1986 ===
A four-issue limited series in the style of Marvel Universe and G.I. Joe: Order of Battle, featuring lengthy bios of nearly all of the Transformers of the period. Most of the text was the same as the tech specs found on the toy boxes, only much more expanded. The first three issues (as well as the first portion of the fourth) contained all of the first, second and third year Transformers. The latter half of the fourth issue dealt with characters new to The Transformers: The Movie (1986), including characters that were not made as toys at the time.

The series was collected as a trade paperback in July 1987.

=== G.I. Joe and The Transformers, Marvel, U.S., 1987 ===
A four-issue limited series written by Michael Higgins, G.I. Joe and the Transformers teamed-up the Transformers with the other popular Hasbro property of the 1980s, G.I. Joe. The Joes, the Autobots, and Cobra (after being betrayed by the Decepticons) must join forces to stop the Decepticons from activating an energy drill device to suck up energy from the Earth's core, which would destroy the planet in the process.

The story was hampered by continuity issues (though the storyline was only referred to in the pages of the Transformers comics, as G.I. Joe writer Larry Hama opted to ignore the mini-series), and the absence of several key characters from both franchises, including Cobra Commander, Optimus Prime, and Megatron, as the three characters were presumed dead at the time of the mini-series' publication. The story featured Bumblebee being destroyed by G.I. Joe forces and rebuilt as Goldbug. This plot point was ignored in the UK comic, where the story was not reprinted until much later in the comic's run, and resulted in an alternate story being conceived to change the character into his "Goldbug" persona.

Marvel UK also featured a crossover between these two properties. 'Ancient Relics' began in Issue 125 of the UK comic and continued within issues #24-#27 of Action Force, (the name given to the G.I. Joe comic series in the UK).

=== The Transformers: Headmasters, Marvel, U.S., 1987–1988 ===
Autobot Fortress Maximus removes his own head while on the planet Nebulos. From issue #1 of The Transformers: Headmasters mini-series published by Marvel Comics.

The Transformers: Headmasters is a four-issue mini-series (July 1987 – January 1988) introducing new characters that were incorporated into the ongoing series (issue #38) at the conclusion of the mini-series. The series introduces the Headmasters, Targetmasters, some of the movie Transformers, Monsterbots, Horrorcons, Technobots and Terrorcons.

The plot of this series focuses on Cybertronian Autobot Fortress Maximus, who despite his success as a military commander, longs to find peace by leaving Cybertron's civil war altogether. To that end, he gathers a large crew of followers, and they rocket off to the planet Nebulos, which has not seen war in over 10,000 years. Unfortunately, the Autobots' first encounters with the Nebulans are misinterpreted. Intimidated by the robots' size, the Nebulans initiate aggressions against the Autobots. To end hostilities and show his willingness to protect the planet's fragile peace, Fortress Maximus and a few of his followers discard their weapons in front of the Nebulan capital. When that failed to dissuade them, he made the ultimate sacrifice by offering them his head. Four more Autobots did the same, while the remainder returned to their camp unarmed.

Intending to use the situation to his advantage, corrupt Nebulan politician Lord Zarak learned more about the Autobots and the war they left behind and used this information to contact Cybertron. Zarak's message was received by Fortress Maximus's Decepticon equal, Scorponok. After lying to Zarak about the intentions of the Autobots, Scorponok led an invasion force to the planet. Armed only with weapons that had not seen use in millennia, the Nebulan defense were no match for the intentionally aggressive Decepticons. With little options left, Galen, leader of the Nebulan world council, made arrangements for himself and others to become Autobot Headmasters.

Although the Headmaster process made the Autobots able to drive off the Decepticons, all Galen had succeeded in doing was re-igniting the Transformers' war on Nebulos. After Scorponok and now-captive Lord Zarak developed a way to duplicate the process (as well as a later Targetmaster Process), the Nebulos theatre of the Transformers' war escalated. After casualties and collateral damage mounted, Galen eventually convinced Zarak to take their conflict off-world, with nearly all Transformers from both factions following a distress beacon sent by Goldbug from Earth.

Because the series was bi-monthly, very little time passed after its end before a smaller group returned to Nebulos, using resources there and the Powermaster Process to rebuild and empower Optimus Prime.

The entire miniseries was reprinted by Titan Books as part of their series of trade paperback collections based on the Marvel series. This reprint occurred in Vol. 7 (Trial by Fire) which was published in 2005.

=== Transformers Generation 2, Marvel, U.S., 1993 ===
Autobot leader Optimus Prime battles Decepticon Jhiaxus. From issue #3 of the Transformers: Generation 2 comic series published by Marvel Comics.

A 12-issue series, the series expanded the original G1 mythos from the small war on Earth and Cybertron to enclose the whole of the Galaxy that was fast being altered into a likeness of Cybertron itself by the Cybertronian Empire, a race of later generation Transformers that evolved while the earthbound Autobots and Decepticons were deactivated. The events of this series were actually set in motion with a crossover from the G.I. Joe comic books #138–142, in 1993. Megatron returns in his new tank body to reclaim his leadership from Bludgeon and by the end of the series joins with Optimus Prime to fight against the G2 Decepticons and their genetic offshoot, the Swarm. The series ended with an epic battle between the "Generation 1" Transformers, the Cybertronians and the Swarm. It also introduces the Liege Maximo. However, the series was cancelled with issue #12 due to low sales, forcing a quick conclusion to the series' various plot threads. Outside of the 12 issue series, Marvel published a free 8 page comic that was given away at various stores selling the G2 toyline called The Transformers Generation 2: Halloween Special Edition in 1993.

The series was reprinted as 2 trade paperbacks courtesy of Titan Books in 2003. As well some stories were reprinted in the hardcover book Transformers: The Best Of Simon Furman in July 2007.

As they had done with the Generation 1 series, Marvel published a series based on Generation 2 in England. Because their Marvel UK imprint had folded at this point, Marvel struck a deal with the British comic company Fleetway to handle the series in the English market for them. The series only lasted 5 issues as well as one annual in 1995.

=== New Avengers/Transformers, U.S., 2007 ===
A crossover with the original holders of the Transformers license, Marvel Comics, this series takes place in both Marvel's ongoing continuity, (pre-Civil War), and IDW's G1 continuity, set in between Infiltration and Escalation. The 4-issue series is written by Stuart Moore and drawn by Tyler Kirkman. Captain America, Iron Man, Wolverine, and Spider-Man all appear, as well as many of the Transformers cast of Escalation.

The series was collected as a trade paperback in January 2008.

=== Note ===
The Marvel Comics character Death's Head, a character created by Simon Furman, appeared in certain Marvel UK Transformers stories. In the third issue of the All-New Official Handbook of the Marvel Universe A–Z (released on March 22, 2006), the entry for Death's Head's describes his encounters with the Transformers to have taken place in an alternate reality, referred to as Earth-120185, thus separating these stories from existence in standard Marvel Universe continuity. This raises the question of whether or not any of the Marvel Comics Transformers stories take place in the Marvel Universe "proper" (Earth-616), despite such tie-ins as Spider-Man's guest-starring appearance in the original Marvel limited series and Circuit Breaker, a character that originated in the Transformers comics, having a cameo appearance in Marvel's Secret Wars II limited series, which featured nearly every character then existing in the continuity of Earth-616. A case can be made that only the stories that featured Death's Head are separate from standard Marvel continuity, since the character's adventures often involved travel across time and dimensions, not to mention genres; Death's Head also encountered the British science fiction icon the Doctor from Doctor Who once.

== Dreamwave Productions ==
In early 2002, Dreamwave Productions acquired the Transformers comics license and went on to produce a highly successful return of Transformers to the comic world. They started with a limited series focusing on the Generation 1 characters and a monthly series dedicated to Transformers: Armada. The G1 stories were not bound by the previous Marvel stories nor the animated series. Dreamwave produced a large amount of material, but would go bankrupt and lose the Transformers license in early 2005.

=== Generation 1 ===
==== Transformers: Generation 1 (2002) ====
When they acquired the Transformers licence from Hasbro, Dreamwave Productions initially produced a six-issue mini-series, written by Chris Sarracini and drawn by company President Pat Lee, titled Prime Directive. Despite mixed critical reaction and the late shipping of several issues, the series was a huge sales success. Encouraged by this, Dreamwave produced a second series, this time written by Brad Mick, called War and Peace. When the second series emulated the sales of the first, Dreamwave decided to upgrade the Generation One to an ongoing series focusing on the Earthbound Autobots and Decepticons, written by Brad Mick aka James McDonough and Adam Patyk, and drawn by Don Figueroa (although Lee and Joe Ng helped draw the preview issue, and issue #4 featured a back-up story drawn by James Raiz). However, Dreamwave's eventual bankruptcy meant that the series would never be concluded past issue #10. This was the first piece of Transformers fiction to use the term Generation One in the title. After Dreamwave's bankruptcy, the first two miniseries were redistributed in trade paperback form through IDW Publishing.

Of note: there is a magazine that published a 10-page preview in b/w of what was to have been the 11th issue of the series had Dreamwave not gone into bankruptcy, but was of a very low print run.

==== Transformers: The War Within ====
After the success of their Generation One series, Dreamwave decided to do a series focusing on the war on Cybertron before the Transformers came to Earth, and recruited Marvel Transformers writer Simon Furman and former fan artist Don Figueroa for a six-issue series focusing on the rise of Optimus Prime. Later, a second volume appeared titled The Dark Ages, again written by Furman and drawn by regular Marvel Transformers artist Andrew Wildman. The second volume introduced The Fallen, an outcast member of the original thirteen Transformers. A third volume, called The Age of Wrath, written by Furman and drawn by Joe Ng, was released up through issue #3, but due to Dreamwave's bankruptcy it was never completed. The first two series were re-released in trade paperback form by IDW Publishing in March and May 2007.

==== Transformers: Micromasters ====
Micromasters was a four-issue mini-series written by Brad Mick aka James McDonough and Adam Patyk and drawn by Rob Ruffolo. Set on Cybertron after the disappearance of the Ark, the series focused on the history of the titular Micromasters and the discovery of a mysterious Golden Disk with links to the origins of the Transformers. Despite some vocal readers' complaints regarding the series and its art, it also received its share of praise and sold well to the direct market.

==== Transformers: More Than Meets the Eye ====
An eight-issue limited series from 2003 written by Brad Mick aka James McDonough and Adam Patyk (the shapers of Dreamwave's G1 title and its overall Transformers continuity) with art by most of the Dreamwave artists, it featured bios of all the Transformers released as toys in the United States (with the exception of several of the Action Masters). The character entries were done in the same style as the 1986 Marvel limited series, Transformers Universe, with page long bios and art of the characters in both their robot and alternate forms. The character bios included expanded information from the original toys' tech specs, as well as new character development from the Dreamwave Transformers continuity. Issues one through seven contain the character bios, while issue number eight contains entries for key Transformer locations, ideas and technology. The first pages of issue one and the last pages of issue eight feature a mini-comic about where all the information presented in the limited series is coming from, and who is accessing it, which was a prequel story to the Beast Wars television series. The series proved to be popular, and a subsequent More Than Meets The Eye miniseries debuted the next year, this time covering Transformers: Armada.

=== Armada/Energon ===
==== Transformers: Armada (2002–2003) ====
This comic series was based on the new Transformers toyline of that year, Transformers: Armada. The continuity, while following elements from the cartoon series of the same name, was wholly its own continuity. Differences included the Mini-Cons' ability to talk in a normal way rather than the beeps and boops from the cartoon series. Also, the resolution to the Armada saga was quite different and involved cross-dimensional travel and several Generation 1 characters. The series ended at issue #18 and was retitled as Transformers: Energon with the following issue. Originally written by Sarracini, Simon Furman came on board to do a 2-part filler story and ended up as the ongoing writer as a result.

Issues 1–5, written by Chris Saccarini and drawn by James Raiz, would give some background to the original war on Cybertron, detailing how Megatron's campaign started on Cybertron and how the Mini-Cons originally came to Earth, escaping Megatron's grasp. One million years later the arc would introduce the three main human characters (Rad, Alexis and Carlos) and see both sides battle and gain Mini-Cons for the first time.

Issues 6–7 would see Furman take over the scripting, with Pat Lee on art, detailing the discovery of several more Mini-Con teams on Earth. Issues 8–11, with Guido Guidi taking over on art, would see the discovery of a mysterious Mini-Con monolith that would assemble all the Mini-Cons on a base on the moon, leading the Decepticons to attempt a full-scale assault to capture them all. Issues 12–13 would see Megatron construct a superweapon, a powerful laser focusing satellite, in an attempt to destroy the Autobots, as well as capturing enough Mini-Cons to overload Cyclonus's power.

With the series coming to a close and Energon due to take over as the active franchise comic, issues 14–18 were dedicated to the coming of Unicron, with cameo appearances by several G1 characters. With Don Figueroa on art, it detailed the coming of the Heralds of Unicron into the Armada dimension to secure the Mini-Con Matrix and kill all of Unicron's enemies. The arc introduced Jetfire and the concept of Powerlinking, as well as having a battle between Armada Megatron and G1 Galvatron, Unicron's chief Herald. The final issue, again drawn by Guidi, served as a bridge between the Armada and Energon series, detailing Unicron's defeat and Megatron's disappearance.

==== Transformers: Energon (2003–2004) ====
Transformers: Energon

Publication information
- Publisher: Dreamwave Productions
- Schedule: Monthly
- Format: Monthly
- Publication date: 2003–2004
- No. of issues: 12
- Main character(s): Autobots, Decepticons

Creative team
- Created by: Hasbro
- Written by: Simon Furman
- Artist: Guido Guidi

The story to Transformers: Energon picks up ten years after events in Armada. The Energon title was written by Simon Furman and drawn by Guido Guidi and Joe Ng. The first issue was #19 since Armada was not cancelled but rather retitled. The series was discontinued at issue #30 due to Dreamwave's bankruptcy.

Launched in December 2003 Energon would retain the numbering system from Armada, as well as the creative team of Furman and Guidi. Issue 19 would pick up where Armada left off, reintroducing the main cast – as well as Unicron and the new threat of the Terrorcons. Issues 20–23 (drawn by Guidi and Joe Ng) saw the introduction of Unicron's Four Horsemen and most of the relevant cast (Prime, Hot Shot, etc.) receiving their Energon Powerlinking bodies, as well as establishing that Megatron's Spark was trapped within Unicron. It also saw the Terrorcons journey to Earth and saw the return of the principal human cast, as well as the introduction of Kicker. Issue #24, drawn by James Raiz, focused on the past relationship between Ironhide and Tidal Wave. Issue #25, again drawn by Ng, introduced the Omnicons and Snow Cat. Issues 26–29, drawn by Alex Milne, saw a full-scale Terrorcon attack on Earth, Prime aiding Megatron's rebirth and Starscream's return in his Energon form. Issue 30 saw a confrontation between Megatron and Scorponok—but the bankruptcy of Dreamwave prevented this story from being finished.

==== Transformers Armada: More Than Meets the Eye ====
In 2004 Dreamwave released a three-issue version of the More Than Meets The Eye series featuring all the Transformers: Armada characters released as toys in the United States. Written by Brad Mick aka James McDonough and Adam Patyk with art by many Dreamwave artists (including the interlocking covers by Joe Ng), the layout was similar to the Transformers: More Than Meets the Eye mini-series released in 2003, and included separate character bios for the Minicons as well as for the other Transformers.

The first pages of issue one and the last pages of issue three feature a mini-comic of the human character Alexis studying the history of the Transformers. The comic was set sometime between the events of the Transformers: Armada and Transformers: Energon Dreamwave comics.

Before Dreamwave's bankruptcy, an Energon edition of More Than Meets The Eye was also planned but not released.

=== Transformers/G.I. Joe ===
Dreamwave Productions and Devil's Due, owner of the G.I. Joe license, each produced their own six-issue mini-series and with separate continuities. Dreamwave's approach, rather than follow the previous efforts of Marvel Comics, had the story set in an alternate continuity, and was written by John Ney Rieber and drawn by Jae Lee. Here, Cobra had discovered and awakened the Decepticons, reformatting their vehicle modes into 1940s era war vehicles and weapons. The two evil forces conquered much of Europe in an alternative version of World War II. G.I. Joe, here a group of American infantry men, find the Autobots who aid them in stopping both Cobra and the Decepticons. Since Dreamwave's demise, the mini-series has been reprinted in trade paperback form by IDW Publishing.

=== Transformers/G.I. Joe: Divided Front ===
Transformers/G.I. Joe: Divided Front

Publication information
- Publisher: Dreamwave Productions
- Schedule: Monthly
- Format: Miniseries
- Publication date: 2004
- No. of issues: 6
- Main character(s): Autobots, Decepticons, Cobra, G.I. Joe

Creative team
- Created by: Hasbro
- Written by: James McDonough, Adam Patyk
- Artist(s): Edwin Garcia (backgrounds), Nick Kilislian (breakdowns), Pat Lee (pencils)
- Colorist(s): Anthony Washington and Alan Wang

A second volume, Divided Front, was produced. It was written by the writing team of James McDonough and Adam Patyk (who also worked to develop the story treatment for the first volume) and drawn by Pat Lee. Despite strong initial sales of over 44 thousand copies and positive reviews stating the series "exceeded expectations," Dreamwave released only one issue before their financial troubles put a halt to their operations. The story followed Transformers/G.I. Joe, but took place 40 years later in 1985, and was intended to have explained the connection to the first volume's story.

=== Transformers Summer Special ===
The Transformers Summer Special was a one-shot produced in the summer of 2004 that featured stories from Generation 1, Energon, Robots in Disguise, and Beast Wars. The latter two were put to a vote by fans, and the winner (Beast Wars) was to be the next Transformers comic series (see Beast Wars (Unreleased) and Beast Wars (IDW Publishing) Background for more information). The Summer Special was to be an annual mini-series, but due to Dreamwave's bankruptcy only one issue was published.

The Generation 1 segment, written by the main G1 creative team of Brad Mick aka James McDonough and Adam Patyk and drawn by Pat Lee and Joe Ng, focused on Megatron and the Predacons. The Predacons were once warlords on Cybertron who were cast into exile in space. Settling on Planet Beest, (a homage to the Battle Beasts toy line), the Predacons sank into a feral state, and lived as inhabitants of that world for untold years, until Megatron arrived. Having been jettisoned into space by Starscream and restored from the brink of death by Wreck-Gar, Megatron now had his sights set on reclaiming the Decepticon leadership, and required the Predacons to bolster his army. Abandoning his personal weaponry, Megatron pursued Razorclaw through the jungle and soundly defeated him in hand-to-hand combat. Subsequently, he re-engineered the Predacons to give them the ability to combine into Predaking. This would later impact the ongoing Generation 1 comic when Megatron brought them to Cybertron to help defeat Shockwave and later to Earth.

There were three other stories, including a Transformers: Energon tale written by Simon Furman and drawn by James Raiz. The tale focused on Slugslinger, Sharkticon and Snow Cat, who had been defeated in an assault by Omega Supreme, telling lies to Megatron in order to excuse their failure. Megatron eventually appoints Slugslinger as his lieutenant, as his lie was the most impressive.

The other two, both written by Brad Mick aka James McDonough and Adam Patyk, focused around Beast Wars and Transformers: Robots in Disguise. The RiD tale, drawn by Rob Ruffolo, focused on Scourge and Sky-Byte stealing a nuclear reactor, while Optimus Prime and Ultra Magnus learn the value of teamwork to stop them. The Beast Wars tale, drawn by Don Figueroa, focused on Rattrap reminiscing on a time when he was attacked by Dinobot 2, only to be saved by a trio of mysterious Maximals.

=== The Beast Within ===
The comic shows us a what if there is a Dinobot combiner and the comic can only obtained in Transformers G1 DVDs set split into two comics

=== Beast Wars (unreleased) ===
In the Summer Special, a competition was run to choose whether the next Dreamwave Transformers series would be Beast Wars or Transformers: Robots in Disguise. Beast Wars won, and the Generation One team of writers James McDonough and Adam Patyk and artist Don Figueroa were slated as the creative team. However, Dreamwave's bankruptcy would mean that no issues were ever published, although images and issue synopses have appeared on the Internet. After McDonough and Patyk left Dreamwave due to the company's non-payment, writer Simon Furman was added to the series with Figueroa. They would eventually become the creative team on IDW Publishing's Beast Wars series.

== IDW Publishing ==
After Dreamwave's collapse in the winter of 2004, Hasbro awarded the Transformers comic license to IDW Publishing the following spring with plans to relaunch the property. Two miniseries were initially planned: one featuring the Generation One characters and the other focusing on the Beast Wars. The success of these has led to several other projects as listed below. Long-time Transformers writer Simon Furman was brought aboard and given the creative reigns over both series, as well as their spin-offs. He took the opportunity to reboot the Generation One universe, going in a new direction from any previous incarnation, though retaining key elements such as character personalities and paint schemes. By the end of 2022, IDW lost the publishing rights to Transformers.

=== Generation One ===
==== The Transformers: Infiltration ====
The Transformers: Infiltration premiered in October 2005 with issue #0 and properly launched with issue #1 in January 2006. Simon Furman wrote and E. J. Su penciled a new six-issue re-imagining of the Transformers arriving on Earth. The story concluded in July to be continued by The Transformers: Escalation (see below). A trade paperback of Infiltration has since been released, as well as a pocket sized Manga edition.

A recent press release indicated that The Transformers: Infiltration #0 set a record in the five-year history of IDW Publishing, surpassing over 100,000 copies in initial pre-orders.

==== The Transformers: Stormbringer ====
Stormbringer debuted in July 2006 and is set during the same time frame as Infiltration as in the first issue, Optimus Prime receives Ironhide's message from Infiltration. The setting is far from Earth, and the Transformers are scattered across the universe since Cybertron had been made uninhabitable by war. The series' main villain is Thunderwing, and key protagonists include Jetfire and the Technobots. The mini-series was promoted with the tagline "No Humans on Cybertron!", referring to many fans' discontent over the human cast of Infiltration. The four-issue series was written by Simon Furman and drawn by Don Figueroa. The two had previously collaborated on several projects for Dreamwave, as well as IDW's own Beast Wars: The Gathering.

The first issue of Stormbringer contains the number 7 on the UPC, continuing from Infiltration' numbering, meaning that despite being sold as mini-series, the G1 comics by Furman are essentially being considered by IDW as a single comic series. This also is continued in Escalation which starts at #10 on the UPC.

==== The Transformers: Spotlight ====
The Spotlight series is also set in IDW's new Generation One universe and consists of one-shots focusing on characters who have not yet appeared in IDW's main series. However, their tales will have repercussions on the main story, setting up future events or explaining the history behind events already seen. All issues have so far been written by Simon Furman, except for the issue for Kup which was written by artist Nick Roche. Released Spotlights have included Shockwave, Nightbeat, Hot Rod, Sixshot, Ultra Magnus, Soundwave, Kup, Galvatron, Optimus Prime, Ramjet, Blaster, Arcee, Mirage, Grimlock, and Wheelie; four more Spotlight issues are part of the Revelation mini-series and include Cyclonus, Hardhead, Doubledealer, and Sideswipe.

==== The Transformers: Escalation ====
The sequel series to Infiltration. Escalation (again written by Furman and drawn by Su) focuses on the Machination, an organization dedicated to capturing Transformer technology, and on Optimus Prime attempting to stop Megatron's attempts to bring about a war which will decimate humanity. The story began in November 2006 and concluded in April 2007, with Megatron's plans stalled and Sunstreaker captured by the Machination. The story will be followed by The Transformers: Devastation (see below).

==== The Transformers: Megatron Origin ====
This 4-issue mini-series, written by Eric Holmes and drawn by Alex Milne, was published in the gap between Escalation and Devastation. Serving as a prequel story to the current IDW Generation One universe Megatron Origin detail the rise of Megatron to power, the origin of the Decepticons and the beginning of the civil war on Cybertron. The series was due to begin in May, with alternative covers by Milne and Marcelo Matere, but began in June due to artist Alex Milne's illness.

==== The Transformers: Devastation ====
Devastation picked up where Escalation left off. It is another six-issue miniseries. Issue 1 of Devastation was released on October 3, 2007, and was published monthly through March 2008. A follow-up titled The Transformers: Revelation was also released as part of the Spotlight series (see above).

=== Other series ===
In addition to their main Generation 1 continuity, IDW has also created a variety of material based on the various Transformers universes, both the original animated series as well as original material and the 2007 live-action movie.

==== Beast Wars ====
Beast Wars: The Gathering was released in 2006 as a four-issue series written by the Stormbringer team of Furman and Figueroa. The series takes place after season 2 of the Beast Wars animated series and features characters that had toys produced but were not featured in the cartoon. The trade paperback was released in August 2006. A second series called The Ascending was released in August 2007, with a 3-issue bi-monthly series of More Than Meets The Eye-style profile books titled Beast Wars: Sourcebook released in August. The continuity is separate from the new IDW Generation One universe, and is set in-continuity with the original show.

==== The Transformers: Generations ====
Transformers: Generations is a series that reprints key or best-of issues from the Marvel series but with new cover art. Issues containing Marvel characters (such as the original issue #3, which featured Spider-Man) could not be reprinted for this series. Also, using any Dreamwave material is not possible at this time due to legal ramifications from their bankruptcy. After issue #12 was released in March 2007, the series began to reprint the Marvel UK arc Target: 2006 in condensed form, beginning in April, although the Target: 2006 reprints do not feature the Generations title on the cover. Following this there will be a Best of UK series focusing on the Dinobots.

==== The Transformers: Evolutions ====
Evolutions is a title that features stand-alone, out-of-continuity tales from rotating creative teams. Chuck Dixon wrote the first four-part series Hearts of Steel, revolving around steam-powered Transformers on Earth in the 19th century, with art by former Dreamwave artist Guido Guidi. It premiered in July 2006. At its conclusion, the publishers warned that they needed to be conservative with alternate-reality stories, because both they and Hasbro did not want to make things too confusing before the 2007 movie was released. For this reason, the series is on hold until after the movie premieres, but a trade paperback has been released.

==== Transformers: The Animated Movie ====
Transformers: The Animated Movie is a four-issue comic book adaptation of the classic 1986 Transformers movie in correspondence with the 20th anniversary of the film's release. The first issue was released in October 2006 and the run coincided with the release of the Sony/BMG 20th Anniversary The Transformers: The Movie Special Edition DVD, released on November 7, 2006. The adaptation was written by former Marvel Transformers writer Bob Budiansky and illustrated by Don Figueroa. The series included scenes and characters in the comic that did not make it into the movie.

==== Live-action film series ====
Transformers is a comic book series by IDW Publishing, based upon the live-action film series.

==== Transformers: Cybertron – Balancing Act ====
Balancing Act, released by IDW in April 2007, is a collection of stories from the Hasbro Collector's Club Magazine that were published from 2005 to 2006. The stories were written by Forrest Lee and illustrated by Dan Khanna.

==== The Transformers Magazine ====
IDW also published a bimonthly Transformers Magazine. It features strips from the original Marvel US The Transformers series, Dreamwave's Transformers: Armada comic and IDW's own The Transformers: Stormbringer series. Spotlight artist Robby Musso provides original covers. The first issue came due out in June 2007.

==== Transformers: Regeneration One ====
From July 2012 to March 2014, IDW published the series Transformers: Regeneration One. It continued the Marvel Comics canceled Transformers series picking up after the final issue (#80) which was published in July 1991, disregarding the prior sequel comic Transformers: Generation 2, or the Fun Publications webcomic Transformers: Classics that had previously done the same. 21 years later, the series (now under IDW) resumed, and featured the same artists and writer from the final issues of the original Marvel series: Simon Furman, Andrew Wildman, and Stephen Baskerville. The series was revived for the sole purpose of tying up loose ends and ended with #100 where the cover read "#100 in a four issue limited series". In January 2013, IDW began reprinting the series as a 4 volume trade paperback series.

== Skybound Entertainment ==
=== Energon Universe ===
Title	Issue(s)	Writer(s)	Artist(s)	Colorist(s)	Premiere date
Transformers (vol. 4)	1–	Daniel Warren Johnson (1–24)Robert Kirkman (25-)	Daniel Waren Johnson (1–6), Jorge Corona (7–12, 15–18, 20-25), Jason Howard (13–14, 32-), Ludo Lullabi (19, 31), and Dan Mora (25-30)	Mike Spicer (1-14, 16-28, 30-), Sarah Stern (15, 29)	October 4, 2023
Energon Universe 2024 Special	One-shot	Daniel Warren Johnson, Robert Kirkman and Joshua Williamson	Lorenzo De Felici, Ryan Ottley and Jason Howard	Annalisa Leoni, Matheus Lopes and Mike Spicer	May 4, 2024 (Free Comic Book Day edition)

=== Worst Bot Ever (Skybound Comet) ===
Title	Writer(s)	Artist(s)	Colorist(s)	Release schedule
Transformers: Worst Bot Ever — Meet Ballpoint	Brian “Smitty” Smith	Marz Jr.		July 9, 2025

== Other publishers ==
There have been some promotional comics by various small publishers, often lacking a cohesive fictional universe.

=== 3H Enterprises ===
The previous official Transformers convention had comics printed as merchandise. The comics included Tales from the Beast Wars (2 issues), Transformers: The Wreckers (3 issues) and Transformers: Universe (3 issues).

=== Benchpress Comics ===
In spring 1999, new publisher Benchpress Comics announced they acquired the rights to produce new G.I. Joe and Transformers comics. The plan was to release two Transformers monthly series, one would feature the Generation 1 cast of characters and a second title would focus on Beast Wars. Benchpress went bankrupt before a single issue was published.

=== Blackthorne Publishing ===
In 1987, Blackthorne Publishing released The Transformers in 3-D, a comic book series that ran separately from the Marvel Transformers comic book series. The series had three issues, with 28 pages per issue. The comic was not widely distributed, affording the collection to be a rare item. The series is set in the post-The Transformers: The Movie era, featuring characters like Galvatron and Ultra Magnus. Other characters include Optimus Prime, Ironhide, Cosmos, Cyclonus, Razorclaw, Ratbat, Scorponok, Octane and the Quintessons. It also introduced a faction known as the Destructons, who later reappeared in BotCon fiction. Another Blackthorne Publishing Transformers product was a four issue "How to Draw Transformers" series which gave tips and methods to illustrating the characters.

=== Devil's Due Publishing ===
Devil's Due Publishing experienced success with their revived G.I Joe series under license by Hasbro. Both companies produced their own six-issue mini-series detailing a crossover between the two with permission from Hasbro, but Dreamwave had the exclusive license to produce Transformers comics, while Devil's Due had the exclusive license to G.I. Joe; hence the two different miniseries from both companies with two different ideas behind each company's respective franchise. A second series followed in late 2004, followed by a third in 2005, and a fourth in 2006.

==== G.I. Joe vs. the Transformers ====
The Devil's Due story, written by company president Josh Blaylock and illustrated by Mike S. Miller, takes place in an alternate present day where Cobra has uncovered the Ark. Cobra removes the deactivated Transformers found inside, adapting them into Cobra assault vehicles. G.I. Joe is formed to stop Cobra and receives unexpected help from Wheeljack and Bumblebee. When the Transformers eventually break free, G.I Joe are forced to battle the Autobots, Decepticons and Cobra in order to stop a malfunctioning satellite weapons system and prevent the detonation of a nuclear device reacting with Energon.

==== G.I. Joe vs. the Transformers 2 ====
The second four-issue mini-series was written by Dan Jolley and drawn by Tim Seeley and E. J. Su. Cobra was shattered in the first series, but Cobra Commander survived and recruited Destro to help steal Teletran-3. An accident occurs, causing several Joes and Cobra members to be transported to Cybertron. The accident pulls several Transformers to Earth, as well as scattering the characters throughout time. The Joes and Cobra travel into the past and future to retrieve the missing Autobots and Decepticons before the Earth is destroyed.

==== G.I. Joe vs. the Transformers 3: The Art of War ====
A five-issue series written by Seeley and drawn by Joe Ng (with help from James Raiz and Alex Milne). Parts from Megatron have been used to create a re-imagined version of the classic G.I Joe villain Serpentor. Freed by a Cobra raid, Serpentor travels to Cybertron and gathers a massive Decepticon army to seize the Autobot Matrix of Leadership. Cybertron hangs in the balance, causing a disparate group of Joes and Autobots to unite to stop Serpentor.

==== G.I. Joe vs the Transformers 4: Black Horizon ====
A two-part series (written by Seeley and drawn by Andrew Wildman) connecting from the end of "The Art of War". Hawk, now resigned from G.I. Joe, has teamed up with a group of Autobots under Prowl to stop the spread of Cybertronian technology on Earth. They are unaware that a bigger threat looms, an alliance of Cobra-La and Unicron. The series consists of two double-sized issues.

According to writer Seeley, the plot of Black Horizon is the one he initially wanted to use for The Art of War, but was turned down by Hasbro, leading to the use of a re-imagined Serpentor instead. The series' format was also changed from four regular issues to two double-sized issues, as Hasbro wanted to avoid competition with the 2007 Movie tie-in comics.

See also Devil's Due's G.I. Joe vs. Transformers section in G.I. Joe (comics).

=== Panini Comics ===
Panini Comics published a Transformers: Armada comic in the United Kingdom in 2003, aiming at younger readers. The series lasted nine issues. It was written by Simon Furman. The comics included backing stories called "Tales of the Mini-Cons" which spotlighted those particular characters.

=== Titan Magazines ===
To coincide with the release of the 2007 movie, Titan Magazines produced a new UK monthly title called Transformers. The first issue went on sale on July 27, 2007. The book contains a ten-page original lead strip, and reprints six or seven pages per issue of IDW's movie prequels and Beast Wars: The Gathering. It is edited by Steve White, who also worked for Marvel UK's Transformers title; the UK strips are written by Simon Furman. Artists have included Geoff Senior and Nick Roche, and are to include Andrew Wildman, Don Figueroa and Nick Roche, with Guido Guidi and Marcelo Matere confirmed on issues 5 and 6.

The UK original strips open each issue and tie into the continuity of the IDW prequel comic. Each one focuses on one character. The first two stories – Optimus Prime and Megatron – focused on Optimus sending the Allspark into space to keep it out of Megatron's hands. Megatron heads after it, following his interrogation of Bumblebee in the movie prequel, and Jazz, Ratchet and Ironhide attempt to stop him. He sends Devastator after them with a foldspace warhead, causing all four to be "lost in space".

Each issue comes with a free gift. #1 had dog tags with Autobot or Decepticon logos on them, #2 had removable tattoos, #3 had a keyring, which would be either the Autobots or Decepticons logo, and #4 had 4 badges.

== Hasbro mini-comics ==
A mini-comic that was packaged with various series of toys, and printed in various languages. The comics told small side stories relating to the premise of the associated toyline and exist in their own continuities.

=== Optimus Primal/Megatron – "Beast Wars" ===
An eight-page mini-comic that was sold with the Optimus Primal/bat and Megatron/crocodile Beast Wars toys. The mini-comic establishes the Maximals and Predacons on present-day Earth, which contradicts the time-travel story later set by the Beast Wars television series and toy descriptions.

The mini-comic features appearances by Optimus Primal, Megatron, Cheetor, Razorbeast, Waspinator, and Tarantulas, but only Optimus and Megatron have speaking parts.

=== Transformers: Armada ===
A four-part series released throughout the Armada toy line. The series was produced by the same team that started on Dreamwave's Transformers: Armada comic, story by Chris Saccarini and illustrated by James Raiz. The first 2 volumes were printed in English, Spanish, and French.

Volume 1 features Optimus Prime, Megatron, Hot Shot, Jolt, Cyclonus and Crumplezone. Volume 2 introduces Scavenger and Rollbar vs. the Mini-Con Destruction Team and Starscream. The third volume features the Mini-Con Air Defense Team captured by Galvatron before being rescued by Optimus Prime and Jetfire. In the final volume, Optimus Prime, Overload and Roll Out face off against Galvatron who combines with Tidal Wave.

== See also ==
- Micronauts
- Rom the Space Knight
- Shogun Warriors
- Transformers (Skybound Entertainment)

== Sources ==
- Furman, Simon (2004). Transformers: The Ultimate Guide. DK Publishing Inc. p. 70. ISBN 1-4053-0461-8.
