= Transformers: Generation One (Dreamwave) =

Dreamwave Productions comic book series

Transformers: Generation One was a Dreamwave Productions comic book series, consisting of two six-issue limited series and an ongoing title. Within the same continuity were three other Dreamwave series: a series of character profiles entitled Transformers: More Than Meets the Eye, a prequel miniseries entitled, Transformers: Micromasters and another prequel ongoing miniseries called Transformers: The War Within. In addition, a single story was part of the Transformers Summer Special. All ongoing series were cancelled in 2005 due to Dreamwave's bankruptcy, leaving their plotlines unresolved.

The 'Generation One' term has also come to be associated with the wider Transformers universes based on the original Transformers animated series and Marvel comics.

== Prime Directive (Volume 1) ==
Transformers: Generation 1 (Volume 1)
- Prime Directive, issue #1, drawn by Pat Lee

Publication information
- Publisher: Dreamwave Productions
- Schedule: Monthly
- Format: Miniseries
- Publication date: April – September 2002
- No. of issues: 6
- Main character(s): Autobots, Decepticons

Creative team
- Written by: Chris Sarracini
- Artist: Pat Lee
- Penciller(s): Pat Lee, Edwin Garcia
- Inker(s): Rob Armstrong, Erik Sander, Ferdinand Poblete
- Colorist(s): TheRealT!, Ramil Sunga, Gary Yeung, Alan Wang, Talent Pun, Shaun Curtis, Rob Ruffolo, Stuart Ng, Angelo Tsang, Juan Malera, Matt Cossin, Pat Lee

The Prime Directive miniseries takes place after the Autobots had attempted to leave Earth for a second time in a space ship called the Ark II, along with the defeated Decepticons. The Ark II was sabotaged, exploding in the upper atmosphere and sending all the Transformers falling back to Earth, deactivated. The story concerns the reactivation of the Transformers by a scheming entrepreneur and the results when things don't go as planned.

=== Plot ===
The story begins several years after the destruction of the second Ark. The military, led by General Hallo, recruit an unwilling Spike Witwicky to help them face a new menace - as satellite pictures show a reactivated Megatron destroying a South American rebel camp. Most of the Transformers lost in the Ark disaster have now been recovered by Lazarus, a former US Army officer who has developed a way to control the Transformers, and is now selling them as war machines to the highest bidder, using them to slaughter a group of oil workers as a demonstration. Using a small fragment of the Matrix of Leadership, given to him by Optimus Prime Spike is able to reactivate the one Transformer recovered by the military - Prime himself. Prime is reactivated, but Spike is angry and bitter towards him for his father's death because of their involvement in the war.

Meanwhile, Megatron and the Decepticons have broken free, killing Lazarus, and plan to use a technorganic virus to reformat Earth into a new Cybertron. Prime and the other reactivated Autobots confront their old foes, but are stopped when Hallo drops a massive bomb on all of them. The advancing virus takes the brunt of the blast, fuelling it further, and the Decepticons (joined by the defected Grimlock) escape. As the Autobots try to stop the virus Megatron unleashes Devastator on San Francisco in a mass slaughter. Prime and some of the other Autobots arrive in time to halt them, but when Superion is gunned down by Starscream, Skywarp and Thundercracker the Autobots are decimated by Devastator's strength. Prime takes out the giant combiner in a full-frontal assault, and Megatron takes the chance to cajole his greatest enemy into joining him.

Meanwhile, Wheeljack and the rest of the reactivated Autobots try in vain to stop the spread of the virus, which is now fuelling itself, but are hindered by the Canadian military. Spike has been imprisoned by Hallo after discovering the truth - that Hallo was responsible for the destruction of the second Ark. After his attempts to create his own transforming robots had failed one of his subordinates developed a way to control the Transformers, so they sabotaged the Ark in order to gain the Transformers for themselves. Lazarus later went rogue and took most of the Transformers with him. Hallo now plans to obliterate his mistake by launching a nuclear missile at San Francisco. Spike escapes with help from one of Hallo's former employees, and Hallo is gunned down by the President and his aides. The nuclear missile has already been launched, however.

Back in San Francisco Prime refuses to join his foe, and is spared death when Megatron is distracted by heroic firefighters. The Autobots defeat their foes, but Superion is forced to sacrifice himself to stop the missile. In Canada, Wheeljack also manages to create a device to stop the virus, but sacrifices his own energy to power it. The Decepticons escape due to the distraction caused by the missile, but Grimlock refuses to rejoin the Autobots. Spike now rethinks his attitude towards the Autobots.

== War and Peace (Volume 2) ==
After the impressive sales of the first volume Dreamwave commissioned a second six-issue mini-series. Again drawn by Pat Lee, it was now written by Brad Mick (later revealed as Dreamwave writer James McDonough). The plot would focus on the Transformers' homeworld of Cybertron, and feature Shockwave as the main villain.

=== Plot ===
A year after the events of the first series, the Autobots and Decepticons are drawn to the Arctic by a signal from a mysterious pod. As the two sides battle the pod opens to reveal Scourge, who tells the astonished Transformers that the war is over and Shockwave has united the planet. Shockwave himself then arrives with a bodyguard of Autobots and Decepticons, gunning down Scourge and arresting the Earthen Transformers as war criminals. After quelling any discontent with his new Triple Changers (and gunning down Megatron) the rest of the Transformers leave peacefully, but not before Prime leaves a team of Autobots on Earth just in case.

After Starscream dumps Megatron in space after escaping from stasis the Autobots learn that Shockwave had indeed unified the planet, awarding power to an Autobot council while he remains in charge of the military, with Ultra Magnus as his second in command. Before the series started Cybertron had completely shut down before Scourge arrived to study the inhabitants. Reactivating Shockwave he saved him from the Sharkticons, only to be shot in the back in return. Shockwave used the secrets plundered from Scourge's body to create the Triple Changers and unify Cybertron. In the present, Shockwave is studying Alpha Trion for his access to Vector Sigma, and has Menasor reactivated as a distraction while he puts the final phase of his plan into operation. In the meantime Grimlock has located the rest of the Dinobots in the Arctic and is now returning to Cybertron with them.

Prime, about to be forcibly shut down, is saved by Sandstorm and Broadside take him to see an Autobot resistance group led by Hot Rod, where he discovers that Shockwave has secretly been conditioning the population for a war of conquest. With Magnus taking out Menasor and the Dinobots battling the Guardian units Prime led an attack on Iacon itself. A doubting Magnus is shot by Shockwave, and he also takes the Matrix from Prime to access Vector Sigma. However he is stopped by Magnus, now having lost his damaged outer armour to reveal his inner robot - who looks exactly like a white Prime. It is revealed Magnus is in fact Prime's brother, and the two stop Shockwave as Starscream and his followers flee the planet. Grimlock arrives and saves both brothers from falling into the pit at the centre of Cybertron. Elsewhere Megatron's battered body is recovered by Wreck-Gar

== Generation One (ongoing title) ==
After the success of the second series Dreamwave decided to upgrade the series to ongoing status. A special issue #0 was released, written by Brad Mick aka James McDonough and Adam Patyk, with art by Pat Lee, Don Figueroa and Joe Ng. With Figueroa taking over as sole penciller from issue #1, the stories would mostly focus on the Autobots led by Jazz, who were left behind on Earth by Optimus Prime in the second series. The first six-issue arc would focus on the conflict between Jazz' team and Starscream's faction, who left Cybertron at the end of the second series. After an attack by Bruticus most of the Autobots are captured. However Starscream's forces were decimated by the self-destructing Ark and by the arrival of the most unexpected foe of all - Starscream's seemingly mad but extraordinarily powerful clone Sunstorm, forcing Starscream into an uneasy alliance with the Autobots and a reactivated Jetfire. The arc also introduced Omega Supreme, and would reveal the existence of a mysterious Cybertronian seal on Earth, which only Starscream could open. A backup strip drawn by James Raiz in issue #4 revealed that Megatron had been repaired, and that Wreck-Gar had built an army of Seeker clones for him before the Decepticon leader obliterated him.

The next two issues reintroduced Spike, and dealt with the Autobots battling the Insecticons to free the mind-controlled inhabitants of a town. Issues #9 and 10 would focus on the Decepticon leadership, with Megatron returning, backed by the Predacons (who he had forced into service in the Summer Special), first forcing Shockwave into servitude, stopping his Sixchanger experiments, before journeying to Earth to beat Starscream into submission. It was hinted that all three knew something significant about Cybertron's past, but Dreamwave went out of business before this could be revealed.

The series was routinely Dreamwave's best-selling regular series. It was alternately praised and criticised for its very 'fan-friendly' writing (using more obscure G1 characters and bringing in much continuity, for example). Bankruptcy brought the series to a sudden close after issue #10 in January 2005, with many plots left unresolved. With Chris Saccarini rejoining as writer and Pat Lee on art, previews indicated that issue #11 would have featured the female Autobots from the original animated series and issue #12 would feature the return of Optimus Prime (who had been injured in War and Peace). Scourge - Now in the possession of the Earth Defence Command - was also set to reappear, along with Cyclonus.

== IDW Publishing ==
When IDW Publishing acquired the rights to the Transformers licence, they would reprint the first two G1 mini-series from Dreamwave in trade paperback form in February and March 2006. As of April 2007, Ryall remarked that the unpublished Dreamwave stories were still tied up in legal issues and that it was likely to stay that way, leaving those stories unfinished.
