= Headmasters =

Headmasters may refer to:

- Headmaster (Transformers), a toy series
- Transformers: The Headmasters an anime series
- The Transformers: Headmasters, a comic series
