= The Transformers: Escalation =

Publication information
- Publisher: IDW Publishing
- Schedule: Monthly
- Format: Mini-series
- Publication date: November 2006–April 2007
- No. of issues: 6
- Main character(s): Autobots, Decepticons

Creative team
- Created by: Hasbro
- Written by: Simon Furman
- Artist(s): E. J. Su

The Transformers: Escalation is a six-issue comic book mini-series, published by IDW Publishing, based on the Transformers and following on from The Transformers: Infiltration. The series launched in November 2006 and ended in April 2007. The series is available in The Transformers: Volume 2.

== Plot summary ==
No.	Title	Release date	ISBN
01	The Transformers: Escalation #1	November 29th, 2006	—
Artist: E.J. Su; The Machination team tasked with monitoring the Autobots' base beneath Lake Michigan practice simulations on destroying a Transformer, even as Prowl makes the executive decision to send their new human friends Verity Carlo, Hunter O'Nion, and Jimmy Pink back to their normal lives. At the Decepticon Command Bunker in Oregon, Astrotrain briefs Megatron on the potency and raw strength of Ultra-Energon, who has decided to forgive their treacherous actions just this once; Megatron is pleased by what he sees but is suspicious of the super-fuel's true origins. Ironhide and Sunstreaker leave the Ark-19 to return the humans, unaware they are being pursued by the Machination, while Megatron orders that Phase Two begin by activating the "facsimiles." The two Autobots are separated in traffic outside of Lebanon, Missouri, and the Machination agents strike, stunning Ironhide and disabling Sunstreaker before firing a bazooka into the chaos. By the time Ironhide, Verity, and Jimmy force their way through the traffic, nothing remains of Sunstreaker and Hunter except a smoking yellow wreck.
02	The Transformers: Escalation #2	November 29th, 2006	—
Artist: E.J. Su; Nine months ago, U.S. senator Alexander Holt discussed stability in the Gulf with a US Army General in Washington D.C., both men unaware they were being surveilled by the Decepticon Runabout. In the present day, Optimus Prime, Jazz, and Wheeljack race towards the site of the Machination attack; Optimus rejects Ironhide's suggestion to attack the Decepticons and orders him to return Verity and Jimmy to the Ark-19 while his team retrieves Sunstreaker's remains. Thundercracker and Skywarp destroy a Middle Eastern power plant at Megatron's command, further destabilizing geopolitical relations, while Optimus' team reclaims Sunstreaker's remains from Machination agents. Aboard the Ark-19, Ratchet determines that the wreckage is not Sunstreaker, suggesting that both he and Hunter could still be alive.
03	The Transformers: Escalation #3	January 24th, 2007	—
Artist: E.J. Su; In the Russian breakaway state of Brasnya, rebel leader and Decepticon facsimile construct Georgi Koska meets with Megatron, who orders him to destroy Russia's primary oil pipeline. As Megatron orders Skywarp and Blitzwing into position, Optimus calls in backup and denies Ironhide's request to continue searching for Sunstreaker and Hunter; Verity and Jimmy convince Ratchet to help them look for their missing friends on their own. Koska's rebel forces attack a Russian convoy with the Decepticons' help, and Optimus decides to intervene upon realizing that an Ultra-Energon-powered Megatron is on the battlefield with Koska. The battle between the Brasnyans and the Russians begins in earnest as a team of Autobots arrive on the scene, while Nightbeat, Hardhead, and Hot Rod await orders in orbit aboard the Ark-32, and Ironhide requests to join Ratchet, Verity, and Jimmy in their covert search for Sunstreaker and Hunter.
04	The Transformers: Escalation #4	February 28th, 2007	—
Artist: E.J. Su; Ratchet, Ironhide, Verity, and Jimmy's search for Sunstreaker and Hunter leads them to a suspiciously well-guarded auto parts store in Fort Wayne, Indiana. As the two humans infiltrate the store, they are unaware that Hunter is indeed alive and about to undergo an ominous surgical procedure. As Optimus takes out Blitzwing, Megatron and Koska arrive on the battlefield and are confronted by Prowl, Jazz, and Wheeljack; the facsimile is ordered to self-terminate and runs toward the Russian guns as Skywarp, Astrotrain, Hardhead, and Hot Rod join the fight. As Koska evades the Autobots' attempts to capture him, Megatron confronts Optimus while Verity and Jimmy are ambushed in the auto parts store; the two are knocked unconscious by gas after finding a secret room, and a timer begins counting down from 10 minutes.
05	The Transformers: Escalation #5	March 28th, 2007	—
Artist: E.J. Su; Abraham Dante, leader of the Machination, speaks with an unknown and heavily damaged Transformer regarding the successful procedure involving Hunter. Meanwhile, the Russian and Brasnyan armies watch in awe as Optimus and Megatron battle, even as the other Autobots and Decepticons continue fighting around them and Hot Rod and Prowl continue pursuing Koska. Ironhide breaks into the auto parts store and finds the unconscious Verity and Jimmy, while Megatron's Ultra-Energon enhanced strength proves too much for Optimus; the Autobot leader is felled and supposedly killed. Prowl manages to save Koska from the Russians, while in Eureka, Nevada, agents of the secret organization Skywatch take command of an archaeological dig that has unearthed the pieces of six strange Transformers – one purple cyclops and five others that resemble dinosaurs.
06	The Transformers: Escalation #6	May 2nd, 2007	—
Artist: E.J. Su; Megatron gloats over Optimus' fallen body, shrugging off attacks from the furious Autobots while unaware that Optimus is actually still alive, having transferred his mind into the Combat Deck inside his alternate mode's trailer. In this limbo realm of Infraspace, Optimus sees a mysterious Transformer call out to him as Ironhide and Ratchet work quickly to free Verity and Jimmy from the auto parts store before the timer reaches zero. Ratchet and the humans escape as the building explodes, but Ironhide is caught in the blast and vanishes. Optimus reconnects to his body and shoots Megatron in the back, instantly depleting his source of Ultra-Energon and forcing him to retreat; however, Skywarp and Thundercracker had already attacked Hot Rod and Koska while everyone was distracted, heavily damaging the former and destroying the latter. Dante presents a modified Hunter and several headless Sunstreaker clones to his Transformer associate, Skywatch leader Joshua Reid prepares to send out reprogrammed Decepticons Ravage and Laserbeak, and a furious Megatron orders Astrotrain to summon the most powerful Decepticon warrior to Earth and annihilate the Autobots – Sixshot.

== Notes ==
Beyond Escalation, Furman hopes to have the Headmasters and Predacons appear. He also would like to have the Japanese G1 characters appear at some point. The Transformers: Devastation introduces the multiple Sunstreaker Headmasters and the Predacons had a small role in The Transformers: Stormbringer.

Escalation picks up on several other plot threads introduced in other IDW G1 stories.

=== In relation to The Transformers: Spotlight ===
- The Dinobots and Shockwave, dug up here by Skywatch, were buried in Spotlight: Shockwave after a battle between the two ended in both being buried in lava.
- Laserbeak and Ravage were also discovered by Skywatch in Spotlight: Soundwave after a battle between Soundwave and Bludgeon caused the volcano they were in to explode (though only Laserbeak was shown at the time).
- The story of Sixshot and the Reapers was first explored in Spotlight: Sixshot.
- The mysterious face that Prime sees in the limbo realm of "infraspace" is Nova Prime, which is expanded on in the Spotlight: Optimus Prime and referred to in Spotlight: Galvatron.
- Hot Rod and Nightbeat both join Optimus' crew after their perspective Spotlights. Indeed, Hot Rod still retains the alt-mode from his issue.

=== In relation to The Transformers: Stormbringer ===
- Prime's method of defeating Megatron — by causing him to wear out his Ore-13 by exerting himself more — was the same method which led to Thunderwing's defeat in that story, explaining how Prime knows of this weakness.
- Hardhead was part of Optimus' crew, first seen in Stormbringer.

== Easter eggs ==
- In issue 4, the name of the garage that the Machination is using is "Ideas and Design Works" — the full name of Transformers publisher IDW Publishing.
- There are a host of items in the garage referencing various other Transformer lore. These include a poster bearing the words "Kiss Players", leaflets on "Seibertron cars" and the sale of "Binaltech air filters"

== Characters ==
=== Autobots ===
Bumblebee
Hardhead
Hot Rod
Ironhide
Jazz
Nightbeat
Optimus Prime
Prowl
Ratchet
Sunstreaker
Wheeljack

=== Decepticons ===
Astrotrain
Blitzwing
Megatron
Runabout
Runamuck
Skywarp
Starscream
Thundercracker
