= The Transformers: Infiltration =

Comic book

- Trade Paperback cover by E. J. Su

Publication information
- Publisher: IDW Publishing
- Schedule: Monthly
- Format: Mini-series
- Publication date: October 2005 – July 2006
- No. of issues: 7, including a #0
- Main character(s): Autobots, Decepticons

Creative team
- Written by: Simon Furman
- Artist(s): E. J. Su
- Inker(s): John Rauch

The Transformers: Infiltration is a six-issue comic book mini-series, published by IDW Publishing, based on the Transformers. The series was previewed with a #0 in October 2005, formally launched with #1 in January 2006 and ended with #6 in July.

Written by long-time Transformers writer Simon Furman, it is a new origin for the Generation 1 Transformers, and also marks the beginning of the Hasbro Comic Book Universe. The element of disguise is a major focus, as the Transformers have been living unnoticed amongst humans for several years. Their first contact with humans on Earth is chronicled in this series. Most of the Transformers have updated alternate modes of current vehicles, although recognizable due to paint schemes similar to their original incarnations. The series is available in The Transformers: Volume 1.

== Story ==
=== Characters ===
Being a new series and continuity, the Transformers featured in Infiltration are based upon their original characters featuring updated modern bodies. Any difference in their personalities goes unnoticed.

Autobots

- Bumblebee
- Ironhide
- Jazz
- Optimus Prime
- Prowl
- Ratchet
- Sunstreaker
- Wheeljack

Decepticons

- Astrotrain
- Megatron
- Runabout
- Runamuck
- Skywarp
- Starscream
- Thundercracker

Humans

- Verity Carlo
- Hunter O'Nion
- Jimmy Pink

=== Plot summary ===
No.	Title	Release date	ISBN
00	The Transformers: Infiltration #0	October 19th, 2005	—
Artist: E.J. Su; At a bus station in Phoenix, Arizona, teenage pickpocket Verity Carlo sets her sights on a businessman's handheld computer, unaware that a nearby black sports car is also interested in the device. Verity manages to steal the computer and escape the bus without arousing suspicion, later hitching a ride with teenage conspiracy theorist Hunter O'Nion; the two discover that Verity's bus has been run off the road by a pair of black and white sports cars, with the only victim being the businessman Verity stole from. As Hunter explains his theory that Earth was invaded by gigantic alien robots disguised as vehicles two years prior, a blue fighter jet with no pilot descends from the sky and destroys their car. Verity and Hunter are saved by a suspiciously well-armed ambulance, whose driver orders them to get in if they want to live.
01	The Transformers: Infiltration #1	January 8th, 2006	—
Artist: E.J. Su; While fleeing from the blue jet, Hunter surmises that both their attackers and their ambulance savior are the "extra-vehicular entities" he is searching for. The black and white sports cars join the pursuit, but the ambulance driver grants Verity and Hunter control of the weapons systems and the three work together to escape. Verity directs the ambulance to a repair shop in Riverside, California owned by her friend Jimmy Pink; as the jet tracks the stolen computer's signal, Jimmy repairs the ambulance and the driver confirms Hunter's theories about their attackers' origins. Verity attempts to leave but quickly returns as the garage door is destroyed by a pair of giant robots – one black, one white, both of whom demand the computer.
02	The Transformers: Infiltration #2	February 8th, 2006	—
Artist: E.J. Su; As Verity, Hunter, and Jimmy gawk in horror at the two giant robots, the ambulance driver springs into action; he shocks the black robot with a fake replica of the computer, and the ambulance itself transforms into a third robot to shield the three humans from the debris and escapes while the white robot is stunned. The death of the businessman is reported to a mysterious board room emblazoned with the letter "M," while the ambulance hightails it onto the road with Verity, Hunter, and Jimmy; the black and white sports cars quickly catch up and identify themselves as Runabout and Runamuck, respectively, while the blue fighter jet returns and begins attacking the ambulance with sonic booms and homing missiles. The ambulance tricks Runabout and Runamuck into crashing, musing that Decepticons never break infiltration protocol this early, and finally introduces himself as Ratchet at Hunter's insistence. The jet continues attacking Ratchet until they are saved by three more vehicles – a police car, a red minivan, and a yellow sports car, who force the airborne Decepticon to retreat. Although the three new arrivals are Ratchet's allies, they transform into robots and draw their weapons; the police car, named Prowl, attempts to arrest Ratchet for breaking protocol but is silenced when Ratchet utters the words "siege mode."
03	The Transformers: Infiltration #3	March 8th, 2006	—
Artist: E.J. Su; Verity, Hunter, and Jimmy are imprisoned by the Autobots as Prowl chews into Ratchet for disobeying orders, breaking cover, and dragging three innocent lives to the crossfire. Ratchet's defense of his actions and observations on the Decepticons' erratic behavior are ignored by the other Autobots, including Ironhide and Sunstreaker, and he reluctantly agrees to find out what is on Verity's computer. Two Decepticon planes, one black and one purple, destroy a trailer in Tucson, Arizona belonging to the dead businessman, while Ironhide sends a secret message to Autobot High Command and Ratchet updates the three humans on their situation; they are currently aboard the Ark-19, an Autobot spaceship underneath Lake Michigan, and discovers images of an abandoned Decepticon command center in Nebraska on Verity's computer. As everyone wonders why the Decepticons have relocated to another base in Oregon and enacted Siege Mode early, the remains of Jimmy's garage are destroyed by a Decepticon tank, which transforms into the purple jet and flies away. Ratchet and Bumblebee agree to help Verity, Hunter, and Jimmy search the Decepticon bunker in Nebraska for answers, while the black and purple jets, known as Skywarp and Blitzwing, are ordered to destroy the bunker by Starscream.
04	The Transformers: Infiltration #4	April 12th, 2006	—
Artist: E.J. Su; Under Ratchet and Bumblebee's supervision, Verity, Hunter, and Jimmy rappel into the abandoned Nebraska bunker and split up to investigate. A shadowy organization known as the Machination led by Abraham Dante discusses the increased frequency of the alien attacks and orders a team of operatives led by Drake to accelerate their plans. Verity discovers a series of green tubes containing rotted human corpses, while Ratchet and Bumblebee are attacked by Skywarp and Blitzwing on the surface. Jimmy and Hunter evacuate the base on Ratchet's orders as the two Autobots engage the Decepticons; Bumblebee outsmarts Skywarp's teleportation powers, and Ratchet manages to take out Blitzwing's jet mode but is quickly subdued by the Triple-Changer's third tank mode. Ignoring the Autobots' warnings, Verity presses further into the bunker's last room and discovers someone else inside with her: the leader of the Decepticons, Megatron!
05	The Transformers: Infiltration #5	May 31st, 2006	—
Artist: E.J. Su; As Bumblebee helps Ratchet to his feet, Skywarp and Blitzwing abandon the fight to destroy the bunker instead; Hunter and Jimmy are unable to establish contact with Verity even as she stands terrified before Megatron. The Decepticon leader, however, ignores her as he continues his business, and Verity flees when the bunker begins collapsing. The Autobots attempt to retreat with Hunter and Jimmy, but the two boys refuse to leave without Verity; as the Nebraskan landscape collapses into a gigantic sinkhole, Hunter pulls Verity out of the bunker just in time. Although Blitzwing and Skywarp are glad to see the bunker destroyed, their relief quickly turns to terror as a furious Megatron blasts his way out of the wreckage and subdues the two Decepticons, then turns his attention toward Starscream. Ratchet, Bumblebee, and the three humans contact the Ark-19 and explain their theory to Prowl: Starscream's infiltration cell discovered a powerful variant of Energon on Earth known as Ultra-Energon and went into Siege Mode early to protect their discovery. Now Megatron has come to personally put his troops in order, and the Autobots are stuck in the middle of the coming conflict.
06	The Transformers: Infiltration #6	July 12th, 2006	—
Artist: E.J. Su; As Astrotrain powers Starscream up on Ultra-Energon to prepare for Megatron's arrival, Ratchet returns to the Ark-19 with Verity, Hunter, and Jimmy while Prowl's team heads to assist Bumblebee monitor the Decepticon bunker in Oregon. Bumblebee watches as Megatron arrives and demands that Starscream's remaining troops surrender: Astrotrain, Thundercracker, Runabout, and Runamuck comply, but the super-powered Starscream attacks Megatron. Although Starscream is confident his new strength will be enough to take out Megatron, the Decepticon leader shrugs it off and blasts a hole clean through Starscream with his fusion cannon. Megatron orders that "Phase Two" be enacted to deal with the Autobots, who have retreated back to the Ark-19, unaware that the Machination has located their base. Prowl decides to call for backup, but finds that Ironhide had done so already when they are met by the leader of the Autobots: Optimus Prime!

== Analysis ==
The biggest difference in this new G1 continuity is that the Autobots and Decepticons only recently arrived on Earth, rather than having been buried here for four million years. They have communications with forces off-world, and Optimus Prime and Megatron are seen in Cybertronian modes. While Optimus upgrades into an Earth-based alternate-mode, Megatron retains his unique tank mode, although he is still familiar looking with his helmet, black arm cannon and silver paint.

This storyline explores more elements of the Transformers hiding on Earth. The Decepticons have multiple bases, with the Autobots discreetly hiding themselves amongst traffic with holographic drivers. Ratchet is also seen deploying a smoke screen. In addition, the Decepticons place more stock in stealth in this continuity, preferring to destabilize a planet's society covertly before striking rather than attacking directly with the arrogant belief that their larger size and technological superiority will triumph over the "puny fleshlings".

Also exploring elements of the Transformers' presence is that there are conspiracy theorists like Hunter looking at evidence of their existence, and the whole plot revolves around the Decepticons attempting to cover up a massive piece of evidence. In particular, focus is given to the mysterious Machination, who represent the potential government interest and exploitation of the Transformers and their technological nature.

The Autobots and Decepticons bases are the reverse of what they are in other incarnations: The Autobots have an underwater base while the Decepticons are based out of a mountain.

=== Followed by ===
Infiltration heralded the start of IDW's new continuity based on the Generation One characters, allowing Simon Furman to finally write his version of the Transformers without any continuity baggage whatsoever.

The story overlaps with The Transformers: Stormbringer and continues directly with The Transformers: Escalation. There are also prequel stories in The Transformers: Spotlight issues on Shockwave and Soundwave.
