= Blood and Thunder =

Blood and Thunder may be:

- Blood and Thunder (book) by Hampton Sides
- "Blood and Thunder" (song) by Mastodon
- Blood and Thunder (comics), comic book series
- Blood and Thunder (album) by Mortiis
- Blood and thunder, American dime novel genre
- Blood & Thunder: The Life & Art of Robert E. Howard, a biography of Robert E. Howard
- MLW Blood and Thunder, annual event by Major League Wrestling
