= Transformers: Micromasters =

Comic book series

- Cover for Transformers: Micromasters #1

Publication information
- Publisher: Dreamwave Productions
- Schedule: Monthly
- Format: Miniseries
- Publication date: June–September 2004
- No. of issues: 4
- Main character(s): Autobots, Decepticons, Micromasters

Creative team
- Written by: James McDonough, Adam Patyk
- Artist(s): Rob Ruffolo

Transformers: Micromasters was a four-issue comic book limited series released in 2004 which takes place in between the War Within and the Generation 1 series. The main focus of the series is the Micromasters subline of Transformers, though it did have some cameos of notable G1 regulars. The first issue alone sold well over 40 thousand copies in total, exceeding all other single issues of Dreamwave Transformers titles in that release period, including their best-selling Generation One series and their lowest-selling regular series Transformers: Energon.

The series takes place at an undefined point after the third War Within series. Optimus Prime and Megatron have disappeared in the Ark, but the Great Shutdown has not happened yet. Blitzwing and Astrotrain are said to be suffering from physical changes, which suggests that the Triple Changer process is, at least in part, a natural one that Shockwave may have been additionally manipulating.

The history of the Micromasters is different from that previously indicated. Initially downsized Transformers reduced in size to compensate for lower fuel reserves, both Autobots and Decepticons struck a temporary truce to develop the technology further, creating many completely new Transformers and even building a city for them. However, both sides began to recruit amongst the Micromasters, polarising them into two sides. It is implied that the events of the miniseries are what split the Micromasters for good

== Plot ==
The story revolves around the Autobot Hot Rod Patrol. After one of their number is killed by a rival Decepticon Micromaster team, they desert. They ally with the Decepticon Race Track Patrol (who have also deserted due to mistreatment) and battle the Deluxe Insecticons. However, the Autobot Micromasters Countdown and Groundshaker, as well as the Decepticon Micromasters Skystalker and Skyhopper, have arrived with their own agendas. Countdown tries to recruit support for battling the Decepticons on other worlds, while Skystalker defeats Shockwave and orders an all-out assault on the Autobots. Both are more concerned with a mysterious Golden Disk, which seemingly indicates that the Transformers were created by other hands. The story ends with Skystalker defeated and the Hot Rod Patrol leaving to follow their own destiny.
