= Transformers: Generation 2 =

- Logo
- Genre: Science fiction Action/adventure
- No. of seasons: 1

Production
- Production company: Hasbro/Takara

The Transformers: Generation 2 (also known as Generation Two or G2) was a Transformers toy line that ran from 1992 to 1994, in conjunction with a corresponding comic book series and edited reruns of the original cartoon beginning in 1993. The prior Transformer television series, comic books and toys became known as "Generation 1" or G1 retroactively, and are now officially referred to as such by toymaker Hasbro. Generation 2 was discontinued as the first Beast Wars: Transformers toys began hitting the shelves.

== Toy line ==
Generation 2 Transformers toys were reissued versions of G1 toys from the 1980s for the first few months. Some of them were given new spring-powered missile launchers or electronic accessories with flashing lights and sounds, and many of them sported new, vivid color schemes. The trade dress for the toy line included a new logo with alternate Autobot and Decepticon symbols.

Because the G1 toys released during G2 represented only a small fraction of the existing G1 toy line, many of the characters featured in the show did not have G2 counterparts in stores. The fact that many of the color schemes were radically altered meant that these characters no longer matched their animated counterparts. The first new molds were introduced in 1993, first with Megatron in a new tank mode, and later with entirely new characters, including European toys that had never been offered in America.

Another type of toy was the video game market: Argonaut Games had made a deal to make a video game based upon the TV series of the same name. The game was to use the Super FX chip, an enhancement chip for the SNES that allowed 3D games to be much more possible. The game was cancelled in development, and was thought to be transferred over to another Super FX game, Vortex, which had a robot morphing into various vehicles. After an interview with Retro Gamer, it was said that Vortex and Generation 2 were completely separate.

In 1994, the final year of Generation 2, many of the toys in its line were packaged on cards that did not carry the "Generation 2" subtitle under the Transformers name. The two most prominent lines under this banner were the Cyberjets and the Go-Bots (using a trademark acquired by Hasbro from Tonka). The Go-Bots were 1:64-scale cars (compatible with some Hot Wheels and Matchbox tracks) with working axles that transformed into equally small robots. There were initially six different Go-Bot styles produced, all of which were eventually given new colors and were assigned the names of G1 characters. The Cyberjets were small jet planes with missile launchers and among the first Transformers to incorporate snap-together ball-and-socket articulated joints for the robot mode. There were three designs available in a total of six styles, three Autobots and three Decepticons. Two of the Autobot Cyberjets (Jetfire and Strafe) were decorated with G2 Decepticon symbols on their tail fins.

A number of toys were planned for G2, for which prototypes were created but were never sold as part of the G2 toy line. Some of these toys were revisited in later lines like Machine Wars and Robots in Disguise, in which the toys were offered under the Flipchangers and Spychangers assortments.

== Comic books ==
Marvel Comics produced a gritty, twelve-issue Transformers: Generation 2 comic book series. Produced early in the toy line, it features a few new Generation 2 characters, as well as many characters from the original series. The story concerned a form of Transformers, who called themselves Cybertronians, having evolved past Autobot or Decepticon. There was also an overarching enemy, The Swarm, which was slowly approaching the Earth, threatening all Transformers in its path. In his search to discover the nature of the enemy, Optimus Prime went into the matrix, discovering that the Swarm was actually a by-product of an early form of Transformer reproduction. In the UK, a five-issue Transformers: Generation 2 comic was published by Fleetway. While the first two issues featured exclusive UK material, the last three issues featured reprinted stories from the US comic.

As a part of the Generation 2 line, several characters were given new forms, such as Megatron becoming a tank, due to the efforts of Cobra in Marvel's G.I. Joe: A Real American Hero #139. New characters appeared briefly towards the end of the series, including the Rotor Force, Laser Rods, and the Combat Hero edition of Optimus Prime.

In Japan, both TV Magazine story pages and mini-comics packaged with toys told a different G2 story. Set in the animated series' timeline (specifically after the end of Battlestars: Return of Convoy and therefore Operation Combination), the story tells of a true time of peace between Autobots and Decepticons, known as the Cybertron Alliance, until human soldiers accidentally kill one of Megatron's most loyal followers, causing for him to upgrade to his "Combat Hero" form and causing the war to start yet again. The story also featured a fairly bleak storyline and an art style somewhat similar to the Marvel comics, but was different by focusing more on the "new mold" characters (i.e.: The Laser Rods, Laser Cycles, and Cyberjets) and introducing things such as a Reconfiguration Matrix, which allowed Prime to change from his Hero form to his Laser form after nearly being fatally wounded in battle against Megatron. The story ends with Laser Optimus Prime defeating Megatron, who then leads the Decepticons into space after his defeat, while Prime himself is taken off the battlefield, wounded, but victorious.

Dreamwave comics, which produced several Transformers titles, had several Generation 2 characters make cameos in their stories, including the Turbomasters and Axelerators. (Although technically the Turbomasters were released in Europe at the end of Generation 1, they were re-released in Generation 2.) IDW, the Transformers license holder after Dreamwave, has also had several Generation 2 characters appear in their comics, including Skram, Deluge and Leadfoot.

== Animated television series ==
The only new footage produced in association with G2 was a series of primitive CGI sequences used for the Hasbro toy commercials (making it one of the earliest computer-animated series, predating ReBoot) and an advertisement for the Marvel Comics title. A Transformers: Generation 2 television series did air, but it was a rebroadcast of the original Generation 1 Transformers series, using the Marvel Comics commercial as the main title sequence and incorporating CGI footage from the toy commercials for use as the commercial bumpers. New computer-animated scene transitions were superimposed upon the existing cel animation, with footage occasionally slowed down at the end of each act to mask the original fadeout.

Some of the episodes were slightly abridged.

The original stories were presented as though they were recordings of historical events by the Cybernet Space Cube. The contention was that the cube would display scenes from the series on its six sides, spinning around to a new face of the cube during scene transitions. This replaced the classic spinning Autobot and Decepticon logos originally used as scene bumpers.

Some of the Generation 2 versions of the episodes have been released in the United States as region 2 DVDs. Simply entitled "Transformers: Generation 2" the DVD featured the episodes "More Than Meets The Eye" parts 1–3, Transport of Oblivion Roll for it S.O.S. Dinobots Fire on the Mountain War of the Dinobots The Ultimate Doom parts 1-3 Countdown to Extinction Heavy Metal War Autobot Spike Dinobot Island parts 1-2 Enter the Nightbird Changing the Gears A Prime Problem Atlantis Arise Attack of the Autobots Microbots The Insection Syndrome Day of the Machines Megatron's Master Plan parts 1-2 Auto Berserk City of Steel Desertion of the Dinobots parts 1-2 Blaster Blues A Decepticon Raider in King Arthur's Court The Core The Autobots Run The Golden Lagoon The Search of Alpha Trion Prime Target The Girl Who Love Powerglide Triple Takeover Sea Change Masquerade Trans-Europe Express Kremzeek Starscream's Bridage The Revenge of Bruticus Aerial Assault B.O.T. Flight or Flee Ghost in the Machine and The Ultimate Weapon The Blu-Ray was available alongside Blu-ray compilations of miscellaneous original G1 episodes. These early DVD releases were eventually supplanted by Generation 1 DVD volumes and later complete season boxed sets.

=== Episodes ===
Generation 2 episodes were all taken from the Generation 1 television series, which had been previously produced, but with added effects and editing. These episodes aired between 1993 and 1995.

No.	Title	Written by	Original release date	Prod. code
1	"More Than Meets the Eye (Part 1)"	George Arthur Bloom	August 20, 1993	TG2-1
2	"More Than Meets the Eye (Part 2)"	George Arthur Bloom	August 27, 1993	TG2-2
3	"More Than Meets the Eye (Part 3)"	George Arthur Bloom	September 3, 1993	TG2-3
4	"Transport to Oblivion"	Dick Robbins & Bryce Malek	September 28, 1993	TG2-4
5	"Roll for It"	Douglas Booth	September 30, 1993	TG2-5
6	"S.O.S. Dinobots"	Donald F. Glut	June 11, 1993	TG2-7
7	"Fire on the Mountain"	Douglas Booth	November 28, 1993	TG2-15
8	"War of the Dinobots"	Donald F. Glut	September 12, 1993	TG2-11
9	"The Ultimate Doom: Brainwash (Part 1)"	Douglas Booth and Larry Strauss	November 7, 1993	TG2-8
10	"The Ultimate Doom: Search (Part 2)"	Douglas Booth and Earl Kress	November 8, 1993	TG2-9
11	"The Ultimate Doom: Revival (Part 3)"	Douglas Booth and Leo D. Paur	November 9, 1993	TG2-10
12	"Countdown to Extinction"	Reed Robbins & Peter Salas	November 29, 1993	TG2-12
13	"Heavy Metal War"	Donald F. Glut	June 18, 1993	TG2-14
14	"Autobot Spike"	Donald F. Glut	November 1, 1993	TG2-17
18	"Dinobot Island (Part 1)"	Donald F. Glut	July 9, 1993	TG2-19
16	"Dinobot Island (Part 2)"	Donald F. Glut	July 16, 1993	TG2-20
17	"Enter the Nightbird"	Sylvia Wilson & Richard Milton	October 12, 1993	TG2-22
18	"Changing Gears"	Larry Parr	October 4, 1993	TG2-23
19	"A Prime Problem"	Dick Robbins & Bryce Malek	October 14, 1993	TG2-24
20	"Atlantis, Arise!"	Douglas Booth	September 13, 1993	TG2-25
21	"Attack of the Autobots"	David Wise	October 7, 1993	TG2-26
22	"Microbots"	David Wise	October 20, 1993	TG2-27
23	"The Master Builder"	David N. Gottlieb & Herb Engelhardt	July 23, 1993	TG2-28
24	"The Insecticon Syndrome"	Douglas Booth	October 17, 1993	TG2-29
25	"Day of the Machines"	David Wise	October 10, 1993	TG2-30
26	"Megatron's Master Plan (Part 1)"	Donald F. Glut	November 15, 1993	TG2-31
27	"Megatron's Master Plan (Part 2)"	Donald F. Glut	November 16, 1993	TG2-32
28	"Auto Berserk"	Antoni Zalewski	September 14, 1993	TG2-33
29	"City of Steel"	Douglas Booth	November 22, 1993	TG2-34
30	"Desertion of the Dinobots (Part 1)"	Earl Kress	November 3, 1993	TG2-35
31	"Desertion of the Dinobots (Part 2)"	Earl Kress	November 4, 1993	TG2-36
32	"Blaster Blues"	Larry Strauss	October 21, 1993	TG2-37
33	"A Decepticon Raider in King Arthur's Court"	Douglas Booth	July 30, 1993	TG2-38
34	"The Core"	Dennis Marks	July 2, 1993	TG2-40
35	"The Autobot Run"	Donald F. Glut	June 25, 1993	TG2-42
36	"The Golden Lagoon"	Dennis Marks	August 6, 1993	TG2-43
37	"The Search for Alpha Trion"	Beth Bornstein	October 28, 1993	TG2-48
38	"Prime Target"	Flint Dille & Buzz Dixon	August 13, 1993	TG2-50
39	"The Girl Who Loved Powerglide"	David Wise	November 2, 1993	TG2-51
40	"Triple Takeover"	Larry Strauss	September 16, 1993	TG2-52
41	"Sea Change"	Douglas Booth	October 27, 1993	TG2-53
42	"Masquerade"	Donald F. Glut	September 21, 1993	TG2-58
43	"Trans-Europe Express"	David Wise	November 21, 1993	TG2-59
44	"Cosmic Rust"	Paul Davids	November 14, 1993	TG2-61
45	"Kremzeek!"	David Wise	September 15, 1993	TG2-62
46	"Starscream's Brigade"	Michael Charles Hill	September 19, 1993	TG2-63
47	"The Revenge of Bruticus"	Larry Parr	September 20, 1993	TG2-64
48	"Aerial Assault"	Douglas Booth	November 11, 1993	TG2-57
49	"B.O.T."	Earl Kress	November 10, 1993	TG2-65
50	"Fight or Flee"	Tony Cinciripini & Larry Leahy	September 26, 1993	TG2-80
51	"Ghost in the Machine"	Michael Charles Hill & Joey Kurihara Piedra	September 22, 1993	TG2-82
52	"The Ultimate Weapon"	Arthur Byron Cover	September 23, 1993	TG2-85

== Sources ==
- Furman, Simon (2004). Transformers: The Ultimate Guide. DK Publishing Inc. p. 69. ISBN 1-4053-0461-8.
