= Sideswipe (Transformers) =

Transformers character

- Transformers character
- Sideswipe art from Dreamwave Productions
- First appearance: The Transformers
- Voiced by: Michael Bell, Koki Kataoka, André Sogliuzzo, others

In-universe information
- Affiliation: Autobot

Sideswipe is a robot character in the Transformers series. Within the franchise, he is a soldier of the Autobots that serves under Optimus Prime.

== History ==
Sideswipe is an Autobot warrior in the generation 1 Transformers continuity. Prior to the war on Cybertron, he was a trader, and he is the twin brother of the Autobot Sunstreaker. In the 1980s cartoon, he is voiced by Michael Bell in English and by Koki Kataoka in Japanese. Pat Lee, an artist for the Transformers comic published by Dreamwave Productions, said that Sideswipe is his favorite Transformer. In Transformers: Armada, Sideswipe transforms into a Nissan Skyline R32 Sedan.

Sideswipe returns in the live-action film Transformers: Revenge of the Fallen, in which he is voiced by André Sogliuzzo. He is voiced by James Remar in Transformers: Dark of the Moon. In the film series, Sideswipe transforms into a 2009 Chevrolet Corvette Stingray concept car which loses its roof in the subsequent film. Chevrolet debuted the car at the 2009 Chicago Auto Show to promote the film alongside a Chevrolet Camaro (Bumblebee) and a Chevrolet Beat (Skids and Mudflap). In the film, Sideswipe is the Autobot combat specialist and becomes the second-in-command to Optimus Prime after the death of Ironhide. He has skills in stealth, allowing him to gather intel on lone missions, and is captured by the Decepticons on one of these missions. It is revealed in Transformers: Age of Extinction that he was killed offscreen. The car used for Sideswipe in Revenge of the Fallen was one of several vehicles from the film series that were exhibited at the America on Wheels museum in 2017.

== Bibliography ==
- Bellemo, Mark (2007). Transformers Identification and Price Guide. Krause Publications. p. 23. ISBN 9780896894457.
