= E. J. Su =

American comic book artist and penciller

E. J. Su is an American comic book artist and penciller. He was born in Taiwan and moved to the United States at the age of 14. He is best known for his work on IDW Publishing's Transformers (2005) comic book. He also worked as illustrator for Castlevania: The Belmont Legacy.

He has also worked for Image Comics on Tech Jacket (2002), a six-issue limited series, with writer Robert Kirkman. In 2025, he also began his work on Blood & Thunder with Michele "MSassyK" Assarasakorn as another artist, and Benito Cereno writing for the series. Blood & Thunder was also made in partnership with Robert Kirkman.
