= Jazz (Transformers) =

Transformers character

- Transformers character
- Jazz in the Marvel comic
- First appearance: The Transformers
- Voiced by: Scatman Crothers, Minoru Inaba, Darius McCrary, others

In-universe information
- Affiliation: Autobot

Jazz is a fictional robot character from the Transformers franchise. He is usually portrayed as a music-loving Autobot that enjoys human popular culture.

== History ==
The toy that was to become the Autobot Jazz was originally released as part of the Japanese Diaclone series by Takara in 1983. This toy was later released in 1984 by Hasbro in the US under the Transformers brand.

In the Transformers G1 continuity, as depicted in the 1980s cartoon, Jazz is the head of Special Operations for the Autobots. When he arrived on Earth, he quickly assimilated into human culture. He adopted human slang and began enjoying music and popular culture. He transforms into a white Porsche 935 with red and blue racing stripes. In the original cartoon, Jazz is voiced by Scatman Crothers in English and by Minoru Inaba in Japanese. Jazz's English voice actor, his love of music, and his personality have caused him to be popularly interpreted as implicitly Black-coded.

Jazz in the 1980s cartoon

In the continuity of the Transformers comic series by IDW Publishing, Jazz is depicted as a music lover that spent his time watching live music shows before the outbreak of the Decepticon revolution. He joined the Autobots in the war and fought with them for four million years, earning a reputation as one of the strongest Autobot warriors.

In the 2007 Transformers film, Jazz is a fun-loving Autobot that transforms into a Pontiac Solstice. He tries to fight Megatron but is killed when Megatron rips him in half, becoming the first Autobot to die in the film series. This version of the character is voiced by Darius McCrary.
