= The Transformers (IDW Publishing) =

Comic book line

- Composite of Stormbringer covers drawn by Don Figueroa

Publication information
- Publisher: IDW Publishing
- Genre: Science fiction, superhero
- Publication date: October 2005 – November 2018
- No. of issues: 427

Creative team
- Created by: Hasbro

The Transformers (later retitled as Transformers) is a comic book line by IDW Publishing based upon Hasbro's Transformers characters and toy line, featuring many writers and artists across multiple series. It is notable for being the longest continuously running Transformers continuity to date, beginning in October 2005 with The Transformers: Infiltration and ending in November 2018, after the six-issue Unicron event comic. The following year, it would be rebooted and succeeded by a new comic book series on 2019.

IDW lost the license rights by the end of 2022 and the license was passed to Skybound Entertainment in 2023.

== Publication history ==
=== First era ===
Dreamwave Productions shut down on January 4, 2005, and announced they would cease publication of all their comics, leaving Transformers: Generation One and its prequel series, Transformers: The War Within incomplete. Chris Ryall, editor-in-chief of IDW Publishing, leaped at the chance to bid on the property. On May 19, 2005, Hasbro announced they had awarded the licensing rights to IDW Publishing, with plans for an issue #0 in October 2005 and an ongoing title entitled The Transformers: Infiltration to begin in January 2006. Beforehand, Ryall met up with long-time writer Simon Furman. Furman aimed for a contemporary version of the Generation 1 incarnation to appeal to new and old fans alike. They both cited a focus on the "Robots in Disguise" element of the characters, aiming to bring back their "myth and majesty". Overall, Furman described it as, "This was, at last (after 20-plus years) MY take on Transformers." Furman also aimed for a real time approach, using maps to help guide his stories. Infiltration's issue #0 sold 100,000 copies in pre-orders, a record for the company. Furman focused the story on Autobot medic Ratchet and broke new ground for G1-based storylines by excluding the Ark crash storyline and having them only just recently arrived deliberately, to give proper intent to the Transformers being on Earth, thus separating the fictional universe from the Beast Wars one. E. J. Su was hired as the artist, and was given free rein to re-design characters slightly.

Infiltration received mixed reviews. Furman's decision to put leaders Optimus Prime and Megatron on the sidelines divided fans, as did the slow pace and the use of human characters. Furman and Ryall responded positively, promising to make both fans and critics happy after reading various message board comments. The Transformers: Stormbringer followed in July, set around the same time frame as Infiltration, and had art by Don Figueroa. The four issue tale was intended to be a weekly event, but Diamond Comic Distributors' resistance meant it became monthly. Furman had planned to visit Cybertron later on, but the fans demanded a human-less story, and Stormbringer was written. Most importantly, the story revealed Cybertron to be dead, giving the saga a darker feel and explaining the status quo of Autobots and Decepticons spread out and fighting pocket wars. Furman intentionally wanted a larger scale and "took Cybertron out of the equation" to shape the overall arc. The story also allowed him to reinvent Thunderwing and the Pretenders, which he felt was one of the sillier concepts.

In September, the companion series, The Transformers: Spotlight was launched, set to last for five issues. Furman drew upon classic stories for Shockwave, re-created the personalities of Hot Rod and Ultra Magnus, and wrote Sixshot for the first time. Nightbeat's story laid a vital seed for future stories, as well as allowing him to re-invent the Micromasters. In November The Transformers: Escalation began, a direct sequel to Infiltration. It put Optimus and Megatron center stage, and brought in characters from the Spotlights. The Spotlights expanded as IDW accepted Furman's willingness to write for any character. This has even included Wheelie, a character he has personally voiced criticism of in the past.

Furman took a break from the main storyline in June to allow Eric Holmes to write the prequel, The Transformers: Megatron Origin over four months. Holmes conceived the tale for his favorite character, Megatron, and to explore the beginnings of the Autobot-Decepticon war, collaborating with Furman to further tie-in the story into the existing continuity and taking historical inspiration from the decline of the Roman Empire. In addition, Furman allowed Nick Roche to write and draw a Spotlight for Kup, and Roche also wishes to create another one for Rumble. Furman returned for The Transformers: Devastation, which will be affected by Galvatron's Spotlight (itself spinning out of Nightbeat's), before leading into The Transformers: Revelation. Galvatron was re-invented as a separate character from Megatron, and Optimus Prime himself received a Spotlight, with both one-shots including major revelations that will affect storylines beyond Revelation. Devastation had a faster pace and explored rebellion in the Decepticon ranks, similar to the early Marvel stories. With the conclusion of Devastation, Revelation began in June. However, this series had a different format to that seen previously, and consisted of four interrelated Spotlight issues that brought several of the elements of the storyline thus far, most notably the Dead Universe storyline, to a conclusion. The arc following Revelation was a twelve-issue limited series, later expanded to sixteen issues, titled All Hail Megatron which began in July 2008, taking place a year after the end of Devastation and focusing on an Earth conquered by the Decepticons without the Autobots around to stop them, this time written by Shane McCarthy. A planned storyline, Expansion, has now been canceled, although some of the themes the series would have dealt with may still appear. A new mini-series by Furman, Maximum Dinobots, spun out of Spotlight: Grimlock and featured the Dinobots, Sunstreaker, and the Machination, beginning in December after the conclusion of Revelation, with art by Spotlight artist Nick Roche.

Starting in November 2009, an ongoing series of the Transformers was launched and ended in December 2011. Concurrently, during this time, other mini-series were also published: Last Stand of the Wreckers, Bumblebee, Ironhide, Drift, Infestation and Heart of Darkness, the latter of which led into the story arc Chaos.

=== Second era ===
Following a one-shot titled The Death of Optimus Prime, two new ongoing series started in January 2012, Robots in Disguise and More than Meets the Eye. A digital Transformers comic also became available titled Autocracy, consisting of 12 eight-page issues. Two sequels to Autocracy titled Monstrosity and Primacy started publishing in March 2013 and August 2014, respectively. In April and November 2014, the Windblade and Drift – Empire of Stone mini-series were also published. In addition, in November 2014, The Transformers: Robots in Disguise changed its title to just The Transformers. A second ongoing series of Windblade started in March 2015, and its sequel Till All Are One followed in June 2016.

=== Hasbro Universe ===
Starting in 2016, the Transformers comics became part of the Hasbro Comic Book Universe, playing a role during the crossover events Revolution and First Strike. After Revolution ended in November 2016, Transformers and More than Meets the Eye re-titled themselves to Optimus Prime and Lost Light, respectively.

The miniseries titled Transformers: Unicron (which is the finale of this continuity) started being published on May 5, 2018.

== List of titles ==
Title	Issue(s)	Start date	End date	Note(s)
The Transformers: Infiltration	0–6	October 19, 2005	July 12, 2006	
The Transformers: Evolutions: Hearts of Steel	1–4	July 5, 2006	September 27, 2006	Set in an alternate timeline.
The Transformers: Stormbringer	1–4	July 19, 2006	October 18, 2006	
The Transformers: Spotlight	31 (unnumbered)	September 13, 2006	May 1, 2013	
The Transformers: Escalation	1–6	November 29, 2006	May 2, 2007	Sequel to The Transformers: Infiltration.
The Transformers: Megatron Origin	1–4	June 20, 2007	October 24, 2007	
The New Avengers/The Transformers	1–4	July 2007	October 2007	Crossover with the New Avengers (Marvel Comics).
The Transformers: Devastation	1–6	October 3, 2007	February 27, 2008	Sequel to The Transformers: Escalation.
The Transformers: All Hail Megatron	1–16	July 10, 2008	October 14, 2009	
The Transformers: Maximum Dinobots	1–5	December 10, 2008	April 15, 2009	
The Transformers: Continuum	One-shot	November 11, 2009		First guidebook of The Transformers.
The Transformers	1–31	November 18, 2009	December 7, 2011	Sequel to The Transformers: All Hail Megatron.
The Transformers: Bumblebee	1–4	December 16, 2009	March 10, 2010	
The Transformers: Last Stand of the Wreckers	1–5	January 27, 2010	May 19, 2010	
The Transformers: Ironhide	1–4	May 12, 2010	August 4, 2010	
The Transformers: Drift	1–4	September 2010	October 20, 2010	
The Transformers: Infestation	1–2	February 2, 2011	February 16, 2011	Part of the crossover event Infestation.
The Transformers: Heart of Darkness	1–4	March 23, 2011	June 29, 2011	
The Transformers: The Death of Optimus Prime	One-shot	December 21, 2011		
The Transformers: More than Meets the Eye	1–57 (plus 1 annual)	January 11, 2012	September 28, 2016	Issues #23-27 tied to Dark Cybertron; issues #56-57 tied to Titans Return
The Transformers: Autocracy	1–12	January 18, 2012	June 20, 2012	
The Transformers: Robots in Disguise	1–57 (plus 1 annual)	January 25, 2012	September 28, 2016	Issues #23-27 tied to Dark Cybertron; retitled as The Transformers (vol. 2) in issue #35; retitled as Transformers in issue #39; issues #56-57 tied to Titans Return.
The Transformers: Infestation 2	1–2	February 1, 2012	February 15, 2012	Part of the crossover event Infestation 2; related to The Transformers: Hearts of Steel.
The Transformers: Monstrosity	1–12	March 1, 2013	July 31, 2013	Sequel to The Transformers: Autocracy.
The Transformers: Dark Cybertron #1	One-shot	November 6, 2013		Tied to Dark Cybertron.
The Transformers: Dark Cybertron Finale	One-shot	March 26, 2014		Tied to Dark Cybertron.
The Transformers: Windblade (vol. 1)	1–4	April 16, 2014	July 23, 2014	
The Transformers: Punishment	1–5	June 2014 (printed on January 21, 2015)		Digital comic.
The Transformers: Primacy	1–4	August 13, 2014	November 19, 2014	Sequel to The Transformers: Monstrocity.
The Transformers: Drift: Empire of Stone	1–4	November 26, 2014	February 25, 2015	Sequel to The Transformers: Drift.
The Transformers: Windblade (vol. 2)	1–7	March 25, 2015	September 23, 2015	Sequel to The Transformers: Windblade (vol. 1); issues #1-5 tied to Combiner Wars.
Transformers: Combiner Hunters	One-shot	July 29, 2015		Tied to Combiner Wars.
Transformers: Redemption	One-shot	October 28, 2015		Sequel to The Transformers: Punishment.
Transformers: Sins of the Wreckers	1–5	October 2015	June 2016	Sequel to The Transformers: Last Stand of the Wreckers.
Transformers: Till All are One	1–12 (plus 1 annual)	June 15, 2016	December 13, 2017	Sequel to The Transformers: Windblade; issues #5-8 tied to Titans Return.
Revolution	0–5	June 21, 2016	November 30, 2016	
Transformers: Titans Return	One-shot	July 27, 2016		Tied to Titans Return.
Transformers: Revolution	One-shot	October 26, 2016		Part of the crossover event Revolution.
Transformers: Till All are One: Revolution	One-shot	November 2, 2016		Part of the crossover event Revolution.
Transformers: More than Meets the Eye: Revolution	One-shot	December 7, 2016		Part of the crossover event Revolution.
Transformers: Optimus Prime	1–25 (plus 1 annual)	December 14, 2016	November 21, 2018	Sequel to The Transformers: Robots in Disguise.
Transformers: Lost Light	1–25	December 14, 2016	November 7, 2018	Sequel to The Transformers: More than Meets the Eye.
Revolutionaries	1–8	January 18, 2017	September 27, 2017	Team-up between various Hasbro characters.
Transformers Annual 2017	One-shot	March 9, 2017		
Transformers: Salvation	One-shot	June 14, 2017		Sequel to Transformers: Redemption.
Hasbro Heroes Sourcebook	1–3	July 14, 2017	October 25, 2017	Featuring various background stories.
First Strike	0–6	July 14, 2017	October 25, 2017	Sequel to Revolution.
Rom vs. Transformers: Shining Armor	1–5	July 19, 2017	November 27, 2017	Crossover with Rom the Spaceknight.
Optimus Prime: First Strike	One-shot	October 18, 2017		Part of the crossover event First Strike.
Transformers: First Strike	One-shot	November 8, 2017		Part of the crossover event First Strike.
Transformers vs. Visionaries	1–5	January 3, 2018	May 2, 2018	Crossover with Visionaries: Knights of the Magical Light.
Transformers: Unicron	0–6	May 5, 2018	November 14, 2018	
Transformers: Requiem of the Wreckers	One-shot	May 30, 2018		Sequel to Transformers: Sins of the Wreckers.
Transformers: Historia	One-shot	January 9, 2019		Second guidebook of Transformers.

== Collected editions ==
The Transformers has been collected in twenty volumes roughly in chronological order. The first eight volumes, under the title Transformers: IDW Collection, collect most of the series in between Infiltration and Heart of Darkness, including Spotlights. Starting with the issue Death of Optimus Prime, the Transformers are collected under the title Transformers: IDW Collection Phase Two, of which twelve volumes were published. From the Revolution mini-series and the establishment of the Hasbro Comic Book Universe, the Transformers are going to be collected under the title Transformers: IDW Collection Phase Three.

=== Hardcover editions ===
Title	Volume	Material collected	Pages	Publication Date	ISBN
The Transformers: The IDW Collection Phase One	1	Megatron Origin #1–4, Spotlight: Blurr, Cliffjumper, Shockwave, Nightbeat, Hot Rod, Soundwave and Infiltration #0–6	392	May 26, 2010	978-1600106675
The Transformers: The IDW Collection Phase One	2	Stormbringer #1–4, Escalation #1–6, Spotlight: Sixshot, Ramjet, Ultra Magnus, Kup, Mirage and Optimus Prime	374	October 6, 2010	978-1600107511
The Transformers: The IDW Collection Phase One	3	Spotlight: Galvatron, Blaster and Arcee, New Avengers/Transformers #1–4, Devastation #1–6, Spotlight: Grimlock and Wheelie	350	March 2, 2011	978-1600108563
The Transformers: The IDW Collection Phase One	4	Spotlight: Cyclonus, Hardhead, Doubledealer and Sideswipe, Maximum Dinobots #1–5, Drift #1–4, Spotlight: Drift, Metroplex and Jazz	374	May 25, 2011	978-1600109386
The Transformers: The IDW Collection Phase One	5	All Hail Megatron #1–16	352	December 14, 2011	978-1613770528
The Transformers: The IDW Collection Phase One	6	The Transformers #1–6, Bumblebee #1–4, Last Stand of the Wreckers #1–5 and Spotlight: Prowl	364	May 9, 2012	978-1613771839
The Transformers: The IDW Collection Phase One	7	Infestation #1–2, The Transformers #7–18 and Ironhide #1–4	358	October 17, 2012	978-1613774069
The Transformers: The IDW Collection Phase One	8	Heart of Darkness #1–4 and The Transformers #19–31	384	May 29, 2013	978-1613776278
Transformers: The IDW Collection Phase Two	1	Death of Optimus Prime, More Than Meets The Eye #1–5 and Robots in Disguise #1–6	272	September 16, 2014	978-1631400407
Transformers: The IDW Collection Phase Two	2	Autocracy #1–12, Spotlight: Trailcutter and Hoist, More Than Meets the Eye #6–8, Robots In Disguise #7–9 and Spotlight: Orion Pax	332	August 25, 2015	978-1631403644
Transformers: The IDW Collection Phase Two	3	More Than Meets The Eye #9–13 and 2012 Annual, Robots in Disguise #10–11 and 2012 Annual, Spotlight: Thundercracker, Bumblebee and Megatron	332	March 8, 2016	978-1631405402
Transformers: The IDW Collection Phase Two	4	Monstrosity #1–4, Robots in Disguise #12–18 and More Than Meets the Eye #14–16	356	October 25, 2016	978-1631407154
Transformers: The IDW Collection Phase Two	5	Primacy #1–4, Robots in Disguise #19–22 and More Than Meets the Eye #17–22	344	March 7, 2017	978-1631408441
Transformers: The IDW Collection Phase Two	6	Dark Cybertron #1, More Than Meets The Eye #23–27, Robots In Disguise #23–27, Dark Cybertron Finale and Windblade #1–4	388	October 17, 2017	978-1684050857
Transformers: The IDW Collection Phase Two	7	More Than Meets The Eye #28–34 and Robots In Disguise #28–34	340	March 27, 2018	978-1684051496
Transformers: The IDW Collection Phase Two	8	More Than Meets The Eye #35–40, Robots In Disguise #35–38, Punishment and Drift – Empire of Stone #1–4	400	December 18, 2018	978-1684053728
Transformers: The IDW Collection Phase Two	9	Transformers #39–43, More Than Meets The Eye #41–44 and Windblade Vol. 2 #1–5	312	June 18, 2019	978-1684054848
Transformers: The IDW Collection Phase Two	10	Transformers #44–45. More Than Meets The Eye #45–49, Windblade Vol. 2 #6–7, Sins of the Wreckers #1–5, Combiner Hunters #1 and material from the Holiday Special #1	360	December 3, 2019	978-1684055845
Transformers: The IDW Collection Phase Two	11	Transformers issues #46–50, More Than Meets the Eye issues #50–55, the one-shot Redemption and further material from the Holiday Special #1	336	May 26, 2020	978-1684056408
Transformers: The IDW Collection Phase Two	12	Transformers issues #51–57, More Than Meets the Eye issues #56–57, the one-shot Titans Return and Til All Are One #1–4	336	January 5, 2021	978-1684057467
Transformers: The IDW Collection Phase Three	1	Revolution #0-5; Transformers: Till All Are One: Revolution, Transformers: Revolution, Action Man: Revolution, and Transformers: More than Meets the Eye: Revolution, Transformers: Till All Are One #5-8; and Revolutionaries #1-4.	392	November 9, 2021	978-1684058426
Transformers: The IDW Collection Phase Three	2	Transformers: Till All Are One #9–12, Transformers: Optimus Prime #1–6 and Transformers: Lost Light #1–7.	384	March 29, 2022	978-1684058778
Transformers: The IDW Collection Phase Three	3	Revolutionaries #5-8, Transformers: Lost Light #8–12, Transformers: Optimus Prime #7-10, Transformers Annual 2017 and Transformers: Salvation	400	September 27, 2022	978-1413304541

== Chronological comic order ==
This is a chronological listing of the comics in which the timeline of events developed.

1–4. Megatron Origin #1–4

5. Spotlight – Orion Pax
6. Spotlight – Blurr
7–18. Autocracy #1–12
19–30. Monstrosity #1–12
31–34. Primacy #1–4
35. Spotlight – Thundercracker
36. Spotlight – Shockwave
37. Spotlight – Wheelie
38. Spotlight – Cliffjumper
39. Spotlight – Hot Rod
40. Spotlight – Sixshot
41–45. ROM vs. Transformers: Shining Armor #1–5
46–49. Hearts of Steel #1–4
50–51. Transformers: Infestation 2 #1–2
52. Spotlight – Soundwave
53. Spotlight – Ultra Magnus
54–57. Infiltration #0–3
58–60. Stormbringer #1–3
61–62. Infiltration #4–5
63. Stormbringer #4
64. Infiltration #6
65. Spotlight – Kup
66–69. New Avengers/Transformers #1–4
70–71. Escalation #1–2
72. Spotlight – Nightbeat
73–76. Escalation #3–6
77. Spotlight – Ramjet
78. Spotlight – Optimus Prime
79. Spotlight – Galvatron
80–83. Devastation #1–4
84. Spotlight – Blaster
85. Spotlight – Arcee
86–87. Devastation #5–6
88. Spotlight – Mirage
89. Spotlight – Grimlock
90–93. Revelation (contains Spotlights on Cyclonus, Hardhead, Doubledealer & Sideswipe)
94–98. Maximum Dinobots #1–5
99. Spotlight – Drift
100. All Hail Megatron #15
101. Spotlight – Metroplex
102. Spotlight – Jazz
103–117. All Hail Megatron #1–14 & #16
118. Continuum
119. Spotlight - Prowl
120. Last Stand of the Wreckers #1
121. Transformers Vol 1 #1
122–123. Last Stand of the Wreckers #2–3
124. Transformers Vol 1 #2
125. Last Stand of the Wreckers #4
126–127. Transformers Vol 1 #3–4
128–131. Bumblebee #1–4
132–133. Transformers Vol 1 #5–6
134. Last Stand of the Wreckers #5
135–138. Ironhide #1–4
139–142. Drift #1–4
143–144. Heart of Darkness #1–2
145–146. Transformers: Infestation #1–2
147–153. Transformers Vol 1 #7–13
154. Spotlight – Megatron
155–161. Transformers Vol 1 #14–20
162–163. Heart of Darkness #3–4
164–172. Transformers Vol 1 #21–29
173. Spotlight – Bumblebee
174–175. Transformers Vol 1 #30–31
176. The Death of Optimus Prime
177–179. More Than Meets the Eye #1–3
180–184. Robots in Disguise #1–5
185–186. More Than Meets the Eye #4–5
187. Spotlight – Trailcutter
188. Spotlight – Hoist
189–191. More Than Meets the Eye #6–8
192–195. Robots in Disguise #6–9
196–199. More Than Meets the Eye Annual, #9–11
200–207. Robots in Disguise #10, Annual, #11–16
208–218. More Than Meets the Eye #12–22
219–224. Robots in Disguise #17–22
225–236. Dark Cybertron (contains Dark Cybertron #1, More Than Meets the Eye #23–27, Robots in Disguise #23–27 & Dark Cybertron Finale)
237–242. More Than Meets the Eye #28–33
243–247. Robots in Disguise #28–32
248–251. Windblade Vol 1 #1–4
252–256. More Than Meets the Eye #34–38
257–258. Robots in Disguise #33–34
259–262. Transformers Vol 2 #35–38
263–264. More Than Meets the Eye #39–40
265–268. Drift – Empire of Stone #1–4
269. Punishment
270–273. More Than Meets the Eye #41–44
274–279. Combiner Wars (contains Transformers Vol 2 #39–41 & Windblade Vol 2 #1–3)
280–281. Transformers Vol 2 #42–43
282. Combiner Hunters
283. Transformers Vol 2 #44
284–287. Windblade Vol 2 #4–7
288–292. Sins of the Wreckers #1–5
293–297. More Than Meets the Eye #45–49
298. Transformers Vol 2 #45
299. Holiday Special
300. Redemption
301–310. Transformers Vol 2 #46–55
311–316. More Than Meets the Eye #50–55
317–320. Till All Are One #1–4
321–325. Titans Return (contains Titans Return #1, Transformers Vol 2 #56–57 & More Than Meets the Eye #56–57)
326–339. Revolution (contains Prelude, M.A.S.K., ROM, Till All Are One, #1–2, Micronauts, #3, G.I. Joe, Transformers, Action Man, #4, More Than Meets the Eye & #5)
340–343. Till All Are One #5–8
344–349. Optimus Prime #1–6
350–355. Lost Light #1–6
356–359. Revolutionaries #1–4
360–361. Optimus Prime #7–8
362. Transformers Annual
363–364. Optimus Prime #9–10
365. Salvation
366–369. Till All Are One #9–12
370–375. Lost Light #7–12
376–379. Revolutionaries #5–8
380–392. First Strike (contains #0–1, Optimus Prime, #2–6, Transformers, Micronauts, ROM, G.I. Joe & M.A.S.K.)
393–396. Optimus Prime #11–14
397. Till All Are One Annual
398. Optimus Prime Annual
399–403. Transformers vs. Visionaries #1–5
404. Requiem of the Wreckers
405–407. Lost Light #13–15
408–414. Optimus Prime #15–21
415–423. Lost Light #16–24
424. Optimus Prime #22
425–429. Unicron #0–4
430–431. Optimus Prime #23–24
432–433. Unicron #5–6
434. Optimus Prime #25

435. Lost Light #25

== See also ==
- The Transformers (Marvel Comics)
- Transformers (Skybound Entertainment)
