= The Transformers: Megatron Origin =

Publication information
- Publisher: IDW Publishing
- Schedule: Monthly
- Format: Limited
- Publication date: June–October 2007
- No. of issues: 4
- Main character(s): Megatron, Sentinel Prime, Autobots, Decepticons

Creative team
- Created by: Hasbro
- Written by: Eric Holmes
- Artist: Alex Milne

The Transformers: Megatron Origin is a comic book limited series by IDW Publishing exploring the origin of Megatron in its rebooted G1 universe. Written by Eric Holmes, the story explored the beginnings of the Decepticons and the Great War, and serves as a prequel to the various IDW G1 Transformers stories such as The Transformers: Infiltration, Stormbringer, Spotlight and Escalation. Alex Milne is the artist with alternative covers by Marcelo Matere. The series is available in The Transformers: Volume 1.

== Background ==
IDW editor-in-chief Chris Ryall first revealed the existence of the story on his message board, originally to be titled Megatron: Precursor. The first issue of Megatron: Origin was released in June 2007, and the limited series continues the overall title, following Escalation and before the debut of The Transformers: Devastation.

According to the Holmes, Megatron, as a smart character with a determined drive, has always been his favorite Transformer. "Those are the people that change the world. He deserves an interesting tale to have made him what he is." Inspired by Simon Furman's Transformers: The War Within for Dreamwave Productions, which created an origin for Optimus Prime, Holmes felt it would be fun to go back and further explore the beginnings of the Autobot-Decepticon war. Holmes originally approached Dreamwave with the concept, but the company went bankrupt before anything could be published. When IDW took over the Transformers license, they were approached by Holmes as well, loved his idea and he collaborated with Furman to further tie-in the story into the continuity of the IDW-published Transformers comics. Holmes took historical inspiration from the decline of the Roman Empire in his story of the war's beginnings.

== Plot ==
No.	Title	Release date	ISBN
01	The Transformers: Megatron Origin #1	June 20th, 2007	—
Artist: Alex Milne; Four million years ago, Senator Decimus arrives at the run-down Mining Outpost C-12 to announce its imminent shutdown and the coming unemployment of all its workers in favor of automation. The miners' poor reception to the news is exacerbated when Decimus' security detail executes a protester; a young upstart laborer named Megatron attacks Decimus and accidentally murders one of his guards. Although the other workers follow Megatron's example and attack, they are swiftly overwhelmed as a horrified Megatron struggles to process his first kill. The miners are herded aboard a shuttle and sent to a detention center; Rumble and Frenzy approach Megatron and request his help in escaping. Megatron, Rumble, and Frenzy lead the others in taking over the shuttle, and they strand Decimus' ship in deep space. Current Cybertronian leader Sentinel Prime is briefed on the situation by his second-in-command Prowl but shows no interest in pursuing the rebellious miners, unaware that they have already returned to Cybertron and disappeared into the city of Kaon's underbelly.
02	The Transformers: Megatron Origin #2	July 25th, 2007	—
Artists: Alex Milne and Marcelo Matere; Since returning to Cybertron, Megatron and the miners have been competing in the illegal gladiatorial combat games deep within the city of Kaon. As Megatron grows more used to the feeling of killing his opponents, the corrupt Senator Ratbat sends his assistant Soundwave to learn more about the gladiators and their new champion. Prowl and Sentinel Prime also take notice of the games' popularity and quickly mobilize the Autobot police forces to find and arrest the gladiators. Security officers Bumper and Fastback soon catch the Constructicons building one of the mobile gladiatorial areas out of the parts of dead Cybertronians while Soundwave discreetly meets Megatron and provides a cache of black-market weaponry courtesy of Ratbat. Soundwave's partners Ravage, Laserbeak, and Buzzsaw catch Bumper and Fastback eavesdropping on the transaction; Megatron kills the two Autobots and agrees to work with Soundwave and Ratbat.
03	The Transformers: Megatron Origin #3	September 6th, 2007	—
Artist: Alex Milne; As the Constructicons repair Megatron after a particularly nasty fight, Soundwave sidesteps Swindle to bring good news: as requested, he has found Megatron new followers who are capable of flight. The three bots introduce themselves as Starscream, Thundercracker, and Skywarp, and Megatron sends them to Hook for further modifications. Sentinel Prime presides over a funeral for Bumper and Fastback, and a later parade meant to celebrate a new statue of Senator Decimus is interrupted by the three Seekers, who kidnap the senator and escape. Ratbat begins worrying he has gone too far as Megatron puts out a call for more gladiators; as thousands of eager bots attend the rally, including the Predacons and the Dynobots, Megatron assigns Rumble and Frenzy to Soundwave's command before unveiling his new movement – the Decepticons. Although Megatron intends to execute Senator Decimus live on stage, Sentinel's forces crash the rally and arrest many of Megatron's supporters, including his inner circle. Soundwave is set free due to his Senate connections, while Starscream offers to trade information in exchange for his own freedom.
04	The Transformers: Megatron Origin #4	October 24th, 2007	—
Artist: Alex Milne; Starscream is taken into the Senate chamber to testify, but this turns out to have been Megatron's plan all along: Starscream and Soundwave kill the Senators before freeing and arming the others, gifting Megatron an arm-mounted fusion cannon. The Decepticon forces lay waste to Kaon, killing any upper-class Cybertronian they can find and pushing back against the Autobot officers. Sentinel Prime retreats to activate a secret superweapon while Soundwave finds Ratbat planning to escape and shoots him, deciding to transfer his spark to a new body. Sentinel reappears with the gigantic "Apex Armor" battlesuit and breaks through the Decepticon lines, but is quickly halted when Megatron engages him; the two fight one-on-one before Megatron finally kills the Autobot leader. Prowl orders a retreat as Megatron fashions a throne from the remains of the Apex Armor, determined to see all of Cybertron brought under his command as the Decepticons prepare for war.

== Release ==
Issue 1 was originally supposed to be released in May 2007, but was delayed to June due to artist Alex Milne's illness.
