= Matrix Quest =

Marvel Comics storyline

The "Matrix Quest" is the official collective name for issues #62 through #66 in Marvel's Transformers comics, written by UK writer Simon Furman. Each chapter of the story pays homage to a classic movie or book.

Each issue of Matrix Quest was presented with its own symbol on the cover, with a number signifying the episode in the series. However, it was part of the main plot and not a separate mini-comic. The series was reprinted by Marvel UK in issues #262–264 and #282–297 and collected as a trade paperback in 2002.

== The story ==
The Matrix Quest began when Primus, the Transformers' god and core of their homeworld, Cybertron was reawakened, alerting his nemesis, Unicron to his location. Optimus Prime, the Autobot leader, had deduced that the only thing capable of stopping Unicron was the Creation Matrix, which he had once carried inside his body. The Matrix had been lost with Prime's old body when it had been launched into space for burial. Prime assembles several small teams of Autobots to search different parts of the galaxy for the Matrix.

The story takes the form of four individual stories, each focusing on one team. Although the stories do not connect directly to each other, they each detail the ongoing quest and share the common thread of the Decepticon Thunderwing's growing obsession with capturing the Matrix for himself.

=== Issue #62: Bird of Prey ===
The Autobot Headmasters - Nightbeat, Siren and Hosehead - start the Matrix Quest on the planet of Pz-zazz. Pz-zazz is a tough, unfriendly world where corruption and crime thrive. The politics of Pz-zazz are in the hands of two criminal lords, Gutt and B'ghdad. However, a third individual, known as Miss Fatale, also wants her cut of the deal.

The Autobots' troubles start when a dying alien gives them a mysterious, ancient bird icon. This icon seemingly holds the key to the planet's future, and all three crime bosses are after it. Nightbeat, however, places the bird onto the pedestal from which it was originally stolen, and it restores peace and happiness to the world.

At the close of the story, Nightbeat and his companions are captured by Thunderwing and his band of Decepticons.

This chapter pays homage to the Humphrey Bogart film, The Maltese Falcon. Just before he hits B'ghdad with the bird Nightbeat said, "If you want the bird, you can have it! But if you're its real owner, I'm Peter Lorre!"

=== Issue #63: Kings of the Wild Frontier ===
The Autobot Triggerbots - Override, Dogfight and Backstreet - arrive on the planet Cheyenne, a world of hot, arid deserts and small, fledgling frontier towns.

Upon arriving, the Autobots are met by a band of mounted men, chasing a small child, with the obvious intention of killing him. The Autobots come to the child's rescue, and he invites them to his home.

The Autobots succumb to the peaceful life on the alien's farm and quickly forget about the Matrix Quest. However, there's more than meets the eye to this - an encounter with Thunderwing makes Dogfight realise he's not in his right mind any more, so he confronts the host family. The family is revealed to be Vrobians, a malevolent race of psychic vampires. The riders the Autobots met earlier were actually a kind of policemen, seeking to arrest the Vrobians. A fight ensues, and the Autobots win.

This chapter references several cowboy movies. The title may also be a reference to the 1980 Adam and the Ants album of the same name.

=== Issue #64: Deadly Obsession ===
The Autobot Pretenders - Longtooth, Doubleheader and Pincher - arrive on the planet Pequod, which is a world of vast seas.

While cruising on a ship over the oceans, Longtooth encounters a large whale-like creature called a Klud, which bites off his leg, rendering him catatonic. No longer in his right mind, he becomes obsessed with hunting it down and killing it for revenge, while the other two Autobots try to stop him. Longtooth's second encounter with the Klud is interrupted by a Decepticon attack. After defeating the Decepticons, Longtooth's comrades make him see reason, and he spares the Klud's life.

Meanwhile, Thunderwing has come in contact with the Klud, and has somehow learned that the Klud has been in contact with the Matrix - and thus, Thunderwing knows where the Matrix is.

This chapter pays homage to the novel, Moby-Dick.

=== Issue #65: Dark Creations ===
Optimus Prime's body, along with the Matrix, has landed on a moon called Vs'Qs. Vs'Qs is a desolate, almost lifeless place, inhabited only by small vermin, and a human research outpost. However, when the Autobot Pretender Classics - Bumblebee, Jazz and Grimlock - arrive on Vs'Qs, they find that something has killed the outpost's entire crew.

The Autobots face Thunderwing and his Decepticons, but while they fight, a native creature finds the Matrix and tries to escape with it. Thunderwing hunts the creature down and kills it, stealing the Matrix. He then hijacks the Autobots' shuttle and flies back to The Ark, where he attacks Optimus Prime.

This chapter pays homage to Ridley Scott's movie, Alien, and particularly to the sequel, Aliens.

The story also contains a reference to the character of Deathbringer, an alien being mutated by the Matrix that the Autobots faced in a Marvel UK story. This marks one of the few direct references that Furman made to his Marvel UK continuity after he began writing the US comic.

=== Issue #66: All Fall Down ===
An Autobot shuttle returns to the Ark and Prime can sense the Matrix aboard. However, when the shuttle opens, it reveals a fighting mad Thunderwing, who has taken the Matrix for himself after overpowering the Autobots in the high gravity of Vs'Qs.

Thunderwing battles the entire Ark crew, as Prime hesitates, unwilling to risk damage to the Matrix. Presently, the Matrix itself makes itself known, taking over control of Thunderwing's body and revealing itself to have been corrupted by evil. The Autobots are unable to resist the power of the Dark Matrix until Nightbeat, imprisoned since Issue #62, shoots Thunderwing with a grappling harpoon from the shuttle and depressurises the shuttlebay, sucking Thunderwing and the Matrix out into deep space.

The Autobots are left to face Unicron without the Matrix.
