= Optimus Prime (comics) =

Comic book series

- Cover for issue #1 by Kei Zama and David Garcia Cruz

Publication information
- Publisher: IDW Publishing; Hasbro, Inc.
- Genre: Science fiction
- Publication date: December 14, 2016 – November 21, 2018
- No. of issues: 25 (plus 1 annual)
- Main character(s): IDW Transformers universe Hasbro Comic Book Universe

Creative team
- Written by: John Barber
- Artist: Kei Zama
- Colorist: Josh Burcham

Optimus Prime is an American science fiction comic book series written by John Barber, with art by penciller Kei Zama and colorist Josh Burcham. It is published by IDW Publishing in collaboration with Hasbro.

The series is a direct continuation to The Transformers: Robots in Disguise, featuring Optimus Prime as the protagonist, and is set in the Hasbro Comic Book Universe.

The first issue was released on December 14, 2016 alongside Transformers: Lost Light as part of the Hasbro Reconstruction comic book line. The final issue was released on November 21, 2018, in the announcement of a reboot series for 2019.

== Plot ==
=== Volume 1: New Cybertron ===
| No. | Title | Release date | ISBN |
|---|---|---|---|
| 01 | New Cybertron Part 1: To Walk Among the Chosen | December 14, 2016 | — |
Artist: Kei Zama; Four million years ago on Cybertron, before the war, Orion Pax investigates a Decepticon named Hefter who died in police custody and wonders whether current leader Zeta Prime has fallen prey to the corruption that has plagued past Cybertronian Primes. Pax attempts to confront the police officer in question, Outback, who pulls a gun on him and is summarily disarmed. Pax's medic friend Ratchet examines Hefter's body and finds that his cause of death does not match official reports; Pax also meets Ratchet's graduate student Jetfire, who attacks him and reveals he is a Decepticon. In the present day, Pax, now known as Optimus Prime, watches as an anti-Cybertronian protest on Earth turns violent against a cadre of Cybertronian colonists led by Aileron; while meeting with the President of the United States, Pyra Magna, leader of the Torchbearers, arrives to report that a large unknown spaceship is approaching Earth. Optimus, the Torchbearers, Soundwave, Arcee, and Aileron await the spaceship's arrival at the Matterhorn, only for it to destroy the mountain range while landing.
| 02 | New Cybertron Part 2: A Lonely Pillar on the Plain | January 4, 2017 | — |
Artist: Kei Zama; In the past, Pax arrests Jetfire and takes him to his old colleague Prowl, who agrees to help him investigate corruption within the system. Although the initial meeting goes poorly, Prowl convinces Jetfire that he and Pax genuinely want to help him investigate Hefter's death; Jetfire reveals that no one ordered him to attack Pax. In the present, the cheerful Junkions emerge from the spaceship, hoping to trade their technology for Earth's deposits of super-fuel Ore-13. Although the initial contact ends with G.I. Joe operatives destroying Junkion patriarch Wreck-Gar's body, Optimus agrees to meet further with Wreck-Gar and his consort Rum-Maj. Soundwave warns Optimus that the Transformers' civil war destroyed the Junkion homeworld long ago and may have ulterior motives, but Wreck-Gar offers them a positron core, an extremely rare power source that could be used to save Arcee's comatose friend Sideswipe. As the G.I. Joe operatives attempt to eavesdrop on the Autobot-Junkion negotiations with little success, they turn to ex-Decepticon Thundercracker for help.
| 03 | New Cybertron Part 3: Behind My Bleeding Back | January 25, 2017 | — |
Artist: Kei Zama; Four million years ago, Pax, Prowl, and Jetfire meet with Soundwave, who maintains that the Decepticons are innocent of any crimes, including the gun-running that Hefter was allegedly arrested for. Unfortunately, Starscream arrives with the latest shipment of illegal weaponry after the trio departs. In the present, a suspicious Soundwave recruits Cosmos, Rumble, and Frenzy to infiltrate the Junkion ship and discern their true motives, while Thundercracker agrees to help G.I. Joe on the condition that his human friend Marissa Faireborn join the organization, inadvertently reunited her with her estranged father Flint. Optimus pleads the Junkions' case to the Council of Worlds on Cybertron but is rejected by Starscream, while Cosmos, Rumble, and Frenzy board the Junkion ship and are attacked by a ravenous horde of Sharkticons.
| 04 | New Cybertron Part 4: Dance Among the Shadows | February 22, 2017 | — |
Artist: Kei Zama; In the past, Pax's concerns over Zeta's moral stance grow while Jetfire and Prowl stage a fight to make the Decepticons inadvertently expose their gun-running operations. Although Prowl is skeptical the plan will work, Jetfire acquires the date and time of the next shipment's arrival. Four million years later, Cosmos, Rumble, and Frenzy are overrun by the Sharkticons while the Joes realize that Soundwave is acting behind Optimus' back. Optimus tells Aileron that he intends to force the Council of Worlds to accept Earth into their ranks by creating a conflict between the humans and Junkions; Pyra Magna overhears this and attacks him, disgusted with his manipulations and his dismissal of the divinity the Matrix of Leadership bestows on him. Marissa and Flint talk more openly about their strained relationship while Jazz attempts to speak with the members of the riot and gain their perspectives. The Autobots and Earth's leaders gather the next morning to continue negotiations with the Junkions, but Rum-Maj releases the Sharkitcon horde to destroy humanity.
| 05 | New Cybertron Part 5: Future Glories Lost | March 22, 2017 | — |
Artist: Kei Zama; In the past, Jetfire attends the Decepticon meeting wearing a wire, where he discovers Soundwave's deceit about not being involved with the arms smuggling. In the present, Earth comes under attack from the Sharkticons while Optimus orders Metrotitan to restrain the Junkions' ship and calls for a counterattack. Soundwave realizes from Cosmos' account of the Sharkticons' living conditions that they are the Junkions' oppressed servants and quotes Megatron's pre-war writings to inspire the Sharkticons to rise up against their masters. As a Cybertronian colonist named Oiler and Junkion soldiers begin to fall in combat, Arcee interrogates Wreck-Gar about the positron core while the Sharkticons turn on the Junkions.
| 06 | New Cybertron End: Feel Safe Without Regrets | April 26, 2017 | — |
Artist: Kei Zama; Four million years ago, Pax and Prowl attack the meeting site; Pax and Jetfire kill two Decepticon handlers, but the weapons cache is remotely detonated by Starscream. Jetfire leaves the Decepticons while Soundwave lies to the surviving handlers, claiming that the Autobots destroyed the weapons to foster more resentment. In the present, the Sharkticons swarm the Junkion ship alongside the Autobots, interrupting Arcee and Wreck-Gar's battle over the positron core. A stray shot destroys the core and reduces Wreck-Gar to a disembodied head, taking the remaining fight out of Rum-Maj; Optimus orders the Autobots and Sharkticons to stand down, believing that a peaceful solution can emerge with everyone's help. Jazz is approached by a news organization to be interviewed on live television, while the Autobots, Decepticons, Junkions, and Sharkticons convert an old military installation at Bikini Atoll into a refugee camp.

=== Volume 2 ===
| No. | Title | Release date | ISBN |
|---|---|---|---|
| 07 | The Next Day, and the Next | May 24, 2017 | — |
Priscilla Tramontano; Four million years ago, Jetfire's first day at work with the Autobots does not go well; his lab partner Nosecone ridicules him for his flight-based alternate mode (something that Cybertron's strict Functionist doctrines rarely permit), he is attacked by some vengeful Decepticons over his betrayal of their cause and is saved by a little courier bot named Bumblebee, and Nosecone informs him that the surviving weapons from the destroyed cache yielded no useful information. In the present, Optimus and the President discuss the peaceful solution to the Junkion incident and Jazz's upcoming interview, which will likely go poorly due to Jazz previously killing John Powel, a human police officer. Construction of the "Little Cybertron" refugee camp continues as the colonists bury Oiler; his twin sister Slide swears vengeance as Arcee and Aileron bond standing vigil over the deteriorating Sideswipe, and Pyra Magna attempts to gain Marissa's help in taking down Optimus.
| 08 | What It's Really Like | June 14, 2017 | — |
Artist: Casey Coller; In the past, Jetfire's struggles continue: Nosecone continues to despise him for his alt mode and he argues with Pax over his role in Jetfire's current plight and his increasingly violent stance against the Decepticons. However, he reconciles with his Decepticon scientist friend Deluge, who did not mean to see him attacked and just wanted what was best for Cybertron. In the present, Pyra Magna approaches Slide while the Autobots and Junkions continue working but is called away by Optimus so they can travel to Cybertron together and work out their differences. Aileron and Jetfire bond while Jazz's interview commences; although things begin smoothly, the interviewer begins asking Jazz increasingly difficult questions about Cybertronian interference on Earth, including his own murder of John Powell. Jazz halts the interview, upset that his words are being twisted against him; a G.I. Joe team crashes the interview in an attempt to capture Jazz but finds he has already escaped on Optimus' warning.
| - | Transformers Annual 2017: Ghost Stories | March 8, 2017 | — |
Artist: Priscilla Tramontano; Optimus and Pyra Magna travel to the Sea of Rust in an attempt to settle their feud, pursued by Starscream and Bumblebee's ghost. Overlooking the singularity at the ruined Crystal City's heart, the two tell each other a story of their past; Optimus recounts the first time he met Bumblebee, while Pyra remembers her own history with the Torchbearers. Working as a courier before the war, Bumblebees once experienced a series of violent nightmares that compelled him to deliver mysterious packages and unknowingly commit acts of terror; the horrified Bumblebee turned himself into the police, where Orion Pax and Jetfire determined that he was being mentally controlled by Soundwave. Bumblebee helped bust the Decepticon plot, after which he joined Pax's security team. Pyra, meanwhile, once responded to a bandit attack on a Camien ghost town with the Torchbearers. Several Torchbearers, including their leader Praesidia Magna, were attacked and killed by strange animal Transformers, while Pyra faced their mysterious leader in combat. Through a series of nightmares, she learned that her mystery attacker was Onyx Prime, one of the legendary Thirteen Primes of old, and resolved to keep the Torchbearers strong in case Onyx ever returned. Now possessing a greater understanding of each other, Optimus and Pyra agree to an uneasy peace, while Starscream scoffs at their sentimentality and dismisses Bumblebee's ghost as a figment of his imagination – unaware that both Crystal City and Bumblebee survive within the singularity...
| 09 | The Life of Sideswipe | July 12, 2017 | — |
Artist: Kei Zama; As the President and Marissa Faireborn discuss Jazz's failed interview, Wreck-Gar revives Sideswipe using the reconstructed positron core. Although everyone warmly welcomes him back, Arcee is upset that Sideswipe's brother Sunstreaker did not come; Sideswipe dismisses Arcee's concerns, but her words about the death of her own brother lead him to return to Cybertron to search for Sunstreaker. They suspect foul play when Sunstreaker's apartment appears trashed and track him to an apparent Energon smuggling operation led by Soundwave. Sideswipe attacks but is stopped by Sunstreaker; the Decepticons are actually organizing a relief effort, and Arcee and Sunstreaker set Sideswipe up to show him how life has changed for the better. Secure in the knowledge that Cybertron is peaceful at last, Sideswipe dies – Arcee and Sunstreaker had actually mentally projected the scenario into Sideswipe's comatose mind with Wreck-Gar's help to ease his death. Aileron comforts Arcee as she says one last goodbye to her friend.
| 10 | Origin Myths | August 30, 2017 | — |
Artist: Kei Zama and Livio Ramondelli; As Arcee and Sunstreaker bring Sideswipe's body to Cybertron for burial, Earth finally agrees to join the Council of Worlds. While waiting for humanity's representative, Alpha Trion tells Optimus, Pyra Magna, and Starscream about the first time Cybertron united. Long ago, brothers Arcee and Galvatron join warlord Megatronus' conquest of Cybertron and kill Septimus Prime; in Crystal City, the allied Primes Vector Prime, Alpha Trion, Alchemist Prime, Solus Prime, and Nexus Prime are joined by the mysterious Onyx Prime and his servant Liege Maximo, themselves fleeing from Megatronus' army. Onyx's beast army trains Crystal City's inhabitants for battle, but the resulting battle is interrupted by the emergence of the first three Titans from underground: Metroplex, Metrotitan, and Chela. Megatronus stands down upon reuniting with his old friend Onyx, and the eight Primes agree to unite Cybertron together for a peaceful future. However, both Arcee and Alpha Trion grow suspicious of Onyx's true motives. Back on present-day Cybertron, Marissa Faireborn reveals herself as Earth's representative.

=== Volume 3: First Strike, Primeless, and The Dead Come Home ===
| No. | Title | Release date | ISBN |
|---|---|---|---|
| - | First Strike: Unification Day: Dawn | October 18, 2017 | — |
Artists: Guido Guidi and John Wycough; As Earth's induction into the Council of Worlds approaches, Optimus meets with Marissa, Arcee, and Pyra Magna for the human media, while Kup and his friend Action Man prepare to watch the ceremony. Human-Cybertronian hybrids Garrison Blackrock and Centurion discuss what to make of the ceremony, but Cybertron is suddenly attacked by a force of Red Shadows and Iron Grenadiers. Action Man attempts to join the battle but is saved by Optimus, while Kup and Arcee realize Cobra and Baron Ironblood are behind the attack. The bounty hunter Colditz offers Centurion a chance to return to Garrison Krieger's ranks, who agrees and kidnaps Blackrock. Optimus and Marissa see to the Earth dignitaries while Kup, Arcee, Action Man, and Mayday pursue Centurion.
| - | First Strike: Unification Day: Dusk | November 8, 2017 | — |
Artist: Priscilla Tramontano; Arcee and the Revolutionaries easily track Colditz's forces into Cybertron's wilderness, where they dispatch several of the Red Shadows. Blackrock learns that Centurion is planning to betray Krieger and kill him, his human and Cybertronian halves having suffered greatly under him in the past. As Colditz and the remaining Red Shadows ambush Kup and Arcee, Centurion's connection to the mysterious Talisman causes him to erupt with its destructive energy; Arcee attempts to kill him and stop the flow, but Colditz tells Action Man and Mayday that this is Krieger's plan – since Krieger's goal is to destroy Cybertron using the Talisman, Centurion must be eliminated before his connection to the Talisman can stop him. Blackrock stops Arcee and helps Centurion regain control over the Talisman's energy, but the hybrid falls into stasis lock, leaving him unable to stop Krieger.
| 11 | Primeless, Part 1 | October 11, 2017 | — |
Artists: Sara Pitre-Durocher, Fico Ossio, Paolo Villanelli, and Kei Zama; On the day of Earth's induction into the Council, the delegation's departure is met with mixed emotions from the Autobots, colonists, and Torchbearers. Suddenly, the spacebridge shuts down as Cybertron is rocked with explosions. Aileron takes charge and silences the infighting among the other Transformers, sending everyone in different directions; Jetfire works to repair the spacebridge, Thundercracker goes to Sanctuary Station to make sure all the Decepticons are accounted for, Soundwave and the Torchbearers assume command of Autobot City, and Aileron takes the colonists in search of Jazz. As denizens of Earth and Cybertron react to Krieger's attack and news agencies on both worlds begin spinning the story in their own ways, Slide and the colonists begin doubting Aileron's leadership but find Jazz under attack from humans armed with black-market Cybertronian weapons.
| 12 | Primeless, Part 2 | November 1, 2017 | — |
Artist: Andrew Griffith; Cosmos, Sky-Byte, Laserbeak, and Buzzsaw welcome Thundercracker to Sanctuary Station, where they confirm that one shuttle is missing, although they have no idea who stole it. On Earth, the colonists disarm the humans attacking Jazz with more force than necessary, although no one is hurt. Jazz convinces one of the attackers to lead them to the weapons' source, where they find that the culprits are Rumble and Frenzy, who have been selling off the remains of Galvatron's arsenal for months. Unwilling to tarnish the Cybertronians' reputation further in Earth's eyes, Aileron reluctantly lets Rumble and Frenzy go, while Jazz leaves on his own and Slide continues berating Aileron for her poor leadership skills. They return to Autobot City to find that Soundwave has left Jetfire in charge, and Slide's words continue to haunt Aileron.
| 13 | The Dead Come Home, Part 1 (of 2) | November 22, 2017 | — |
Artist: Livio Ramondelli; In the aftermath of Baron Ironblood's attack on Cybertron, Optimus presides over Sideswipe's funeral and makes amends with Sunstreaker but is shocked when Garrison Blackrock brings news of Centurion: the hybrid has fled into Cybertron's wilderness and discovered a newly-born protoform, unseen on Cybertron for millions of years. Learning that the Dinobots might have information about the protoform, Optimus and Blackrock speak with Slug, unaware that he was killed by Sandstorm and revived by Bludgeon on Starscream's orders. The Torchbearers on Cybertron return to Earth as Optimus, Arcee, Blackrock, and Slug find Centurion, Sandstorm, and the other Dinobots; Slug falls under Bludgeon's control and attacks the group as Bumblebee's ghost watches. Meanwhile, many years ago, the Throttlebots faced off against Sixshot, managing to dispatch the Decepticon super-warrior with Metroplex's help. Those remaining escape in a crippled shuttle that crashes on the planet of Regalis V, where all but Goldbug are cut down by Maximal warriors; Goldbug is saved by Prowl, Wheelie, Garnak, and Stardrive.
| 14 | The Dead Come Home, Part 2 (of 2) | November 22, 2017 | — |
Artist: Livio Ramondelli; As Prowl's team evacuates the wounded Throttlebots to their ship, Slug and Sandstorm attack the Dinobots and Optimus, respectively. Arcee follows Sludge as he sneaks away to protect the protoforms but discovers that Trypticon is also guarding the infant Transformers. Centurion breaks the fight up, and Optimus sends Blackrock to get Marissa Faireborn while he gets Slug's attention. Unwilling to let Optimus die, Starscream breaks Bludgeon's control over the revived Dinobot as Arcee and Trypticon return to the surface. As Blackrock and Marissa arrive, Optimus decides to make Trypticon the Earth embassy on Cybertron, just as Metrotitan is the Cybertronian embassy on Earth – and since Trypticon's protoforms are technically on Earth soil, they are under Optimus' jurisdiction and safe from Starscream. Pyra Magna, meanwhile, reports to Prowl, who has discovered that the Maximals are not from the beast planet of Eukaris.

=== Volume 4: The Falling ===
| No. | Title | Release date | ISBN |
|---|---|---|---|
| 15 | The Falling, Chapter 1: Surfeit of Primes | January 17, 2018 | — |
Artist: Kei Zama; The Mistress of Flame shares a story from her youth with Alpha Trion and Scoop; once, before she ascended to the title of Mistress, she traveled to the planet Antilla to find a gigantic eyeball and Onyx Prime, who killed one of her companions. The Mistress and Scoop argue over the divinity of the legendary Thirteen Primes, many of whom have come back into the spotlight, while Optimus Prime (supposedly the Thirteenth "Arisen" Prime) opens a new Ore-13 mine on Earth with the President and Marissa Faireborn. However, the event does not go well, and Slide and the other colonists only exacerbate Optimus' worries about the conjoined future of Cybertron and Earth. Optimus brings the first shipment of Ore-13 to the Council of Worlds, where he clashes with Windblade, now Cybertron's leader, and the Mistress, but their argument is interrupted by the reappearance of the giant eyeball from Antilla. Onyx Prime and the captive Liege Maximo emerge from within, and Onyx confirms that Optimus is indeed the Arisen.
| 16 | The Falling, Chapter 2: Another Mine | February 28, 2018 | — |
Artist: Kei Zama; Soundwave's ruminations about the past are interrupted by Aileron, who tells him that something has happened on Cybertron. The Decepticon emerges from the spacebridge to find that the Council of Worlds and the three Primes on Cybertron – Onyx, Optimus, and Alpha Trion – have withdrawn to meet in private; as an imprisoned Starscream is updated on the situation by Bumblebee's ghost, Soundwave and a group of Decepticons meet with Maximo and attempt to join the meeting as the argument between the Council and Onyx over Optimus' authority reaches a fever pitch. Just as Soundwave storms into the meeting room, an explosion rips through the building and kills Alpha Trion, and Onyx immediately accuses Soundwave and the Decepticons as the culprits.
| 17 | The Falling, Chapter 3: The Ground | April 18, 2018 | — |
Artist: Kei Zama; As Aileron reflects on her life up until this point and learns of Alpha Trion's death, Metrotitan suddenly transforms into robot mode and returns to Cybertron, leaving the Autobots and colonists behind. On Cybertron, Onyx's accusation of Soundwave falls flat, but his tirade against Optimus and the distrustful Decepticons, humans, and colonists he stands with does not; he reveals a long-held secret that proves Soundwave was responsible for Horri-Bull's death many years ago, not Bumblebee, and departs as chaos erupts in the streets. His faith in Starscream restored, Scoop and the other Constructicons combine into Devastator and free him from prison as Metrotitan appears and also pledges himself to Starscream, attacking Onyx's eyeball Titan Nemesis. Optimus and Windblade order Metrotitan to stand down but Nemesis downs Metrotitan with a single shot at Onyx's command. An enraged Optimus attacks Onyx, destroying both his left arm and his face, revealing that "Onyx Prime" is, and always has been...Shockwave!
| 18 | The Falling, Interlude: The First Who Was Named | April 25, 2018 | — |
Artist: Kei Zama; Optimus demands an explanation on Shockwave's apparent return from the dead, something his old friend is only too happy to give.Many years ago, Shockwave's emotions were restored to him at the climax of the Dark Cybertron confrontation and he was flung twelve million years into the past upon the destruction of his equipment. While wandering the landscape of ancient Cybertron, he came across a shepherd named Onyx and killed him, recognizing his importance in the future. He fashioned himself armor out of the dead Onyx's body and converted his flock into Maximals, naming the one bot who stood his ground "Megatronus." His actions now dictated by his knowledge of the future, Shockwave ensured that history unfolded as intended while subtly laying the foundations for his younger self's ambitions; as "Onyx Prime," Shockwave united the Primes and tore them apart, set ancient Cybertron on a colonizing path of conquest, and saw to it that the final resting places of each Prime just so happened to be the thirteen worlds that would later form Shockwave's Regenesis program. As his story ends, Shockwave also hints that a mysterious darkness approaches in the future and all of Cybertron must unite under him to stop it; to make sure that Optimus understands, Shockwave throws him into the Crystal City singularity and destroys him.
| 19 | The Falling, Chapter 4: The Hallowing | May 30, 2018 | — |
Artist: Sara Pitre-Durocher; Starscream watches Optimus be consumed by the singularity, confident that his time to save Cybertron and fulfill his destiny has come at last, while Devastator claims his leader is actually Megatronus reincarnated. Bumblebee's ghost suddenly disappears from Starscream's vision as the Maximals descend on Arcee, Aileron, Jetfire, and the Torchbearers, and Trypticon teleports himself to Earth to keep the protoforms within him safe. The Torchbearers combine into Victorion and engage Devastator in battle while Shockwave appears to Starscream and reveals that his entire life is a lie. Metrotitan's prophecy is false, invented by Shockwave, and Starscream's "destiny" was manipulated to ensure that the foolish Seeker was crowned Cybertron's leader, rendering it divided and broken. Shockwave kills Metrotitan while Optimus awakens in Infraspace, a transitional limbo between life and death, and is greeted by Bumblebee.
| 20 | The Falling, Chapter 5: Endless Forever | July 11, 2018 | — |
Artist: Kei Zama; Bumblebee happily reunites with Optimus in Infraspace, confident that the two can escape together, while Liege Maximo and the Maximals overwhelm Arcee and take her prisoner. Devastator continues to battle Victorion and resist her gravitational powers as Shockwave watches, while Jetfire and Aileron attempt to repair Metrotitan and Windblade reconvenes the Council of Worlds. Elita One recommends attacking while the Mistress of Flame is more concerned about the rioting below as an angry Decepticon horde searches for Soundwave. A dejected Starscream attempts to turn himself in once more but is approached by the Decepticons, who offer him leadership over Cybertron again. Optimus and Bumblebee realize that Infraspace constitutes thoughts without physical forms, and an idea's strength gives it more power in the transitional realm; as the idea version of the Matrix of Leadership, strengthened by millions of years of religious and cultural significance, glows with light, Shockwave ambushes Aileron and Jetfire, forcibly recruiting them for the last stage of his plan.
| 21 | The Falling, Chapter 6: Unforgivable | July 18, 2018 | — |
Artists: Livio Ramondelli, Kei Zama, and Sara Pitre-Durocher; To Jetfire and Aileron's surprise, Shockwave requires their help in rescuing Optimus from Infraspace; as Optimus uses the Infraspace-Matrix to signal the others outside, Arcee destroys the Ore-4 deposit allowing Liege Maximo and the Maximals to fly, sending them plummeting to their deaths. Arcee is saved by Aileron and kisses her, while Victorion kills Devastator and Soundwave almost assassinates Starscream. Meanwhile, Shockwave uses Jetfire to lure Pyra Magna closer, holding her at gunpoint and releasing Optimus and Bumblebee's bodiless consciousnesses into her mind. Pyra disarms Shockwave once the transfer is completed but decides to spare him. As Windblade apologizes to Soundwave and brings him back to the Council, Pyra reveals Shockwave's grand lie about the divinity of the Primes to those present. However, this has always been Shockwave's true endgame: by rendering everything about Cybertron's history, culture, and religion meaningless, he has finally prepared the Autobots and Decepticons for the imminent arrival of their world's ultimate enemy – Unicron.

=== Volume 5: The Coming of Unicron ===
| No. | Title | Release date | ISBN |
|---|---|---|---|
| - | Optimus Prime Annual 2018: Starscream: The Movie | February 28, 2018 | — |
Artists: Priscilla Tramontano and Andrew Griffith; Jealous of Optimus Prime's popularity, Starscream hires Thundercracker to make a biographical film about his life. Thundercracker enthusiastically assembles a team consisting of Seaspray, Proxima, Tankor, and Acid Storm (portraying Starscream) to produce the movie but decides to gather more perspectives from other bots when Starscream's account of his own life is riddled with falsehoods. He speaks with Dirge, Skywarp, and Alpha Trion, casts Flamewar as Rodimus, but grows increasingly angry with his crew over the dilemma of telling the truth or making the movie Starscream wants to see. Marissa Faireborn helps him resolve his worries, and the truthful movie is finished as Starscream is arrested and deposed; however, Starscream attempts to assassinate Thundercracker to prevent the movie's release, and it bombs at Earth's box office due to Rumble and Frenzy's failed venture into cinema. A dejected Thundercracker is approached by a famous movie director on Earth to make another movie, and he happily accepts.
| 22 | Unstopped and Unstoppable | August 8, 2018 | — |
Artist: Sara Pitre-Durocher; Wheeljack builds Optimus and Bumblebee new bodies and extracts their minds from Pyra Magna as Windblade brings dire news: both the colony world Velocitron and an advance team led by Cliffjumper have been destroyed by a strange horned monster planet, which the Talisman identifies as the "uncreator" – Primus' mythical opposite Unicron. Rom the Space Knight senses that his homeworld of Elonia is in danger, and Jazz allows himself to be arrested in exchange for Rom requesting Cybertron's military aid while Prowl's team continues tracking the Maximals. Alas, Rom and the Cybertronian army cannot stop Unicron from destroying and consuming Elonia, and the Transformers soon lose contact with colony worlds Eukaris and Devisun. Prowl deduces that Caminus is Unicron's next target, and Optimus decides to evacuate the population and allow the planet to be destroyed to buy them enough time to infiltrate Unicron's interior; as Starscream rallies the Decepticons across the galaxy and meets with the imprisoned Shockwave, the disgusted Slide and the other colonists decide to take a stand against Optimus.
| 23 | Time Will Rust | September 5, 2018 | — |
Artist: Priscilla Tramontano; As G.I. Joe imprisons Jazz in Mount Rushmore, arguments arise between both captive and captors and within the Joe team. Slide and the colonists stage a rescue mission and are attacked by the remaining Dinobots, while Marissa's phone call to Thundercracker asking for help is overheard by Wreck-Gar and Rum-Maj, who decide to take a stand and defend their new home. Mainframe is killed by Gimlet during the battle, and Slug kills the young colonist in return; however, he is horrified to realize how his violent actions reflect his distaste for Optimus' leadership. The Junkion leaders arrive with a mass of Sharkticons as Jazz escapes and attempts to defuse the battle, while Slide's angry words about how they are allowing Unicron to win are punctuated by the planet-eater's appearance over Earth.
| 24 | A Sunrise Dark | October 17, 2018 | — |
Artists: Andrew Griffith and Sara Pitre-Durocher; As eyes all across Earth turn to the skies as Unicron hovers silently over the planet, Optimus and the surviving Cybertronian population appear in Africa after their last-minute escape from their doomed homeworld. Optimus, Soundwave, Arcee, and Rom meet with the President and Marissa Faireborn, informing them that Unicron has consumed Cybertron and all its colonies, with Earth as his last target. Soundwave learns of his friend Mainframe's death and unleashes a violent scream of pure grief heard around the world, finally convincing humanity that the Transformers are living, feeling beings like them. Prowl's team arrives on Earth as Slide briefs Optimus on the disastrous Mount Rushmore attack, berating him at every turn for his failure to assist them. Optimus and Arcee have a heart-to-heart while awaiting the attack on Unicron, where he wonders whether he too has fallen victim to the corrupted legacy of the Primes and if they will be able to save Earth.
| 25 | Post | November 21, 2018 | — |
Artist: Kei Zama; As Optimus Prime fades away, he looks back on his life and remembers many key events: his birth as Orion Pax, overseen by Alpha Trion, joining the police force under Kup and encountering the Decepticon Ravage with his partner Ironhide, his violent tendencies overshadowing his commitment to justice, meeting Megatron and subsequently becoming a Prime, clashing with the Dinobots over the war's expansion, annexing Earth and wondering whether he really was The Arisen, and one last conversation with Arcee before facing Unicron about the importance of stories. In the aftermath of Unicron's destruction, Earth's many human, Cybertronian, and colonial inhabitants begin to move on with their lives: Arcee and Marissa discuss the former's complicated life story, Jazz oversees clean-up operations in San Francisco, Pyra Magna struggles with her duties as the new Mistress of Flame, Wreck-Gar and Rum-Maj discuss the heavy toll the fight with Unicron demanded, Buzzsaw protects African elephants from poachers in the deceased Soundwave's name, Bumblebee talks with the ghost of Starscream, Thundercracker attends an award ceremony for his screenplay, Aileron, Jetfire, and the colonist soldiers crew a deep space exploration vessel, Prowl imprisons Shockwave in an undersea facility, and Windblade presides over Optimus' funeral, delivering a eulogy that both celebrates and condemns the Autobot leader's life. Arcee tells the story of Optimus to a class of human, Cybertronian, and Elonian children, and Optimus Prime dies with the knowledge that his many successes and failures will inspire others to define their own future.

== Reception ==
According to review aggregator Comic Book Roundup, the first issue scored an average of 8.2/10 based on 10 reviews, while the series as a whole averaged 7.6/10 based on 66 reviews. The first issue received generally positive reviews for both Barber's script and Zama's art from ComicsVerse, IGN, and Comicosity.

== Collected edition ==
| Title | Material collected | Publication date |
|---|---|---|
| Transformers: Best of Optimus Prime | The Transformers (1984) #24; The Transformers (2009) #23; The Transformers: Autocracy #9; Optimus Prime #25; Transformers (2019) #6 | January 2022 |
| Transformers: Best of Arcee | Transformers: Combiner Hunters; The Transformers (2012) #55; Optimus Prime #9; Transformers (2019) #18 | October 2022 |
