= Terminator: Infinity =

Comic book series

Publication information
- Publisher: Dynamite Entertainment
- Schedule: monthly
- Format: Ongoing series
- Publication date: July 2007—April 2008
- No. of issues: 9 (two crossovers with Painkiller Jane)
- Main character: John Connor

Creative team
- Created by: Simon Furman; Nigel Raynor
- Written by: Simon Furman; Jimmy Palmiotti
- Penciller(s): Pat Lee; Stjepan Sejic; Nigel Raynor
- Inker(s): Pat Lee; Stjepan Sejic; Nigel Raynor
- Colorist: Inlight Studio

Terminator: Infinity, originally known as Terminator 2: Infinity, is a comic book series by Simon Furman and Nigel Raynor, published by Dynamite Entertainment. It is set in 2009, six years after the 2003 Judgment Day depicted in Terminator 3: Rise of the Machines. It began as a five-issue limited series published by Dark Horse Comics from July–November 2005, then was revived as an ongoing series, with the title shortened to Terminator 2, as of January 2008.

Despite its title, this series is not a continuation of Terminator 2: Judgment Day.

A crossover with Painkiller Jane occurred midway through the last two issues of the series from January to March 2008, alternating between issues #4 and #5 of that character's respective series also published by Dynamite.

A sequel series, Terminator: Revolution, which ran from December 2008 to June 2009 for five issues, continued from where Infinity left off.

== Plot summary ==
=== Trial by Fire ===
John Connor leaves Crystal Peak a year after the death of his wife, Kate Brewster. Thinking about how Skynet won and mankind was wiped out, he goes to Los Angeles, California, meeting humans and a man named Uncle Bob.
