= The Transformers: Stormbringer =

Comic book mini-series

- Issue #1 cover by Don Figueroa

Publication information
- Publisher: IDW Publishing
- Schedule: Monthly
- Format: Mini-series
- Publication date: July–October 2006
- No. of issues: 4
- Main character(s): Autobots, Decepticons

Creative team
- Created by: Hasbro
- Written by: Simon Furman
- Artist(s): Don Figueroa
- Colorist(s): Josh Burcham

The Transformers: Stormbringer is a comic book mini-series, published by IDW Publishing.

The series debuted in July 2006 and is set during the same time frame as The Transformers: Infiltration (the first issue shows Optimus Prime receiving Ironhide's call from Infiltration). It technically consists of issues seven through ten of the ongoing Transformers saga, which is split into arcs instead of being one complete series. The four-issue series was written by Simon Furman with art by Don Figueroa. Unlike Infiltration, the series is set almost entirely on Cybertron. The series is available in The Transformers: Volume 2.

== Plot summary ==
No.	Title	Release date	ISBN
01	The Transformers: Stormbringer #1	July 16, 2006	—
Artist: Don Figueroa; 700 stellar cycles after the Transformers' home planet of Cybertron was declared uninhabitable and abandoned, the Autobot science vessel Calabi-Yau detects fresh Energon readings coming from the supposedly dead world and sends a team down to investigate, led by the ship's captain Jetfire. Although the Autobots are glad to be home, Cybertron's treacherous landscape and environmental degradation make tracking the readings impossible; as the science crew attempts to home in on the signal, Jetfire's team is attacked by invisible adversaries as the Calabi-Yau is destroyed by a missile volley. Flashbacks throughout the issue from Jetfire and Optimus Prime recall how the catastrophe that contaminated Cybertron was so powerful that even a temporary truce between the Autobots and Decepticons could not stop it. It began when Decepticon scientist Thunderwing assembled the planet's greatest scientific minds during the war to warn them that the planet was dying. As one, they rejected his hypothesis, but his ominous predictions were soon punctuated as Autobots and Decepticons stood together against a flame-wreathed figure...and, in the present, Jetfire awakens beneath Cybertron's surface to find a strange group of mechs worshipping Thunderwing's inert form.
02	The Transformers: Stormbringer #2	August 9, 2006	—
Artist: Don Figueroa; Jetfire awakens to discover he has been captured by the Decepticon Bludgeon and his troops; Bludgeon reveals to Jetfire that his group plans to reawaken Thunderwing and use him to devastate other planets to restore the devastated Cybertron. To do this, they are preparing to undergo Thunderwing's infamous "polydermal grafting process" using the Technobots as raw material, which dramatically increased Thunderwing's strength but drove him insane. Meanwhile, Optimus is notified of the Calabi-Yau’s destruction and orders the Wreckers, an Autobot black ops unit led by Springer, to rendezvous with him on Cybertron and prepare for Thunderwing's reawakening. As Bludgeon prepares to link his own mind to Thunderwing's blank processor and mentally influence his path of destruction, Jetfire attempts to escape but is recaptured; Springer advocates destroying Cybertron entirely to prevent Thunderwing's return even as the revived Decepticon arrives on the planet Nebulos.
03	The Transformers: Stormbringer #3	September 6, 2006	—
Artist: Don Figeuroa; As the mind-controlled Thunderwing begins scouring Nebulos, Bludgeon and his followers begin preparing to undergo the polydermal grafting process as Optimus and the Wreckers save the remaining members of the Calabi-Yau’s crew. The local Decepticon infiltration unit stationed on Nebulos attacks Thunderwing but is swiftly cut down, leaving only Dreadwing and Darkwind. The Wreckers storm Bludgeon's base and overrun his followers, and Optimus finds that Bludgeon has incorrectly completed the polydermal grafting process, trapping him inside his new form. The Wreckers shut down the grafting machines while Springer destroys the axis cradle controlling Thunderwing; Megatron is informed of the situation and authorizes Razorclaw to do whatever is necessary to eliminate Thunderwing, including destroying the planet. While searching through Bludgeon's research, the Autobots realize that Thunderwing is returning to Cybertron.
04	The Transformers: Stormbringer #4	October 18, 2006	—
Artist: Don Figeuroa; As Jetfire pores through Bludgeon's notes on a mysterious fuel source called "Ultra-Energon," Optimus and the Wreckers prepare for battle. Both Thunderwing and a Decepticon warship crewed by the Predacons arrive; Optimus and Razorclaw are willing to destroy their home to stop Thunderwing, but Razorclaw hesitates to initiate the bombardment even as the Wreckers engage Thunderwing. Razorclaw decides to send Decepticon troops led by Divebomb to assist the Autobots but commits to planetary destruction once the warship's weapons are charged, regardless of the battle's outcome. Jetfire realizes that the Ultra-Energon fuelling Thunderwing expends itself quicker the more power is used, but Thunderwing shows no signs of slowing down as Razorclaw's timer ticks closer and closer to zero. The Decepticons retreat in preparation for the bombing when Optimus steps up to finish the fight alone. As the Autobot leader pours everything he has into one last assault, Thunderwing collapses and Razorclaw aborts the bombing just in time. As Optimus' unit leaves Cybertron, Jetfire informs him that Bludgeon found the Ultra-Energon on a planet called Earth; Optimus, who had recently received an update from Prowl's Autobot unit stationed there, begins heading there.

== Relationship to other Transformers series ==
Dreamwave

- Writer Simon Furman and artist Don Figueroa had previously collaborated on several Transformers projects for Dreamwave Productions, the now-bankrupt company that has been granted the Transformers license from Hasbro. They also reunited for IDW's two Beast Wars miniseries.
- Optimus Prime is seen in a pre-Earth form, which appears similar to his pre-Earth form in Dreamwave's The War Within series. Furman has said such a similarity is only coincidental. Stormbringer artist Don Figueroa was also the penciller on The War Within volume 1.

Marvel

- The Centurion drones of the story are a homage to the mechanoid of the same name that appeared in several of Simon Furman's Marvel UK Transformers strips.

IDW

- A sequel of sorts would occur in the Spotlight issue on Galvatron, which revealed what happened to Thunderwing's body after it shut down. The issue on Arcee would reveal Bludgeon's fate as well, revealing his Spark was incarcerated on Garrus-9.
- The conversation between Razorclaw and Megatron in Stormbringer #3 also takes place at the end of Infiltration #4, although the reader does not hear the full conversation until Stormbringer.
- It's unknown whether the Decepticons on Nebulos are binary-bonded yet. However, since they are acting in "Siege Mode" (i.e. covertly) it is unlikely. The Headmaster process was created on Earth in The Transformers: Devastation by Scorponok, so it is highly unlikely that any Transformers other than Scorponok and Sunstreaker are true Headmasters yet.

== Promotion ==
- The miniseries was promoted with the tagline "Nothing but robots on Cybertron!", referring to many fans' discontent over the human cast of Infiltration. The tagline wasn't entirely true — events also occurred on the planet Nebulos, a world populated by aliens of semi-humanoid appearance who feature in the Headmasters, Targetmasters and Powermasters Transformers toy line. Their appearance was minimal, though.

== Artwork ==
- Jetfire's design for Stormbringer was based upon his toy in the Transformers Classics toy line in 2006.
- Thunderwing in phase 2 battle form can be seen here fighting both Autobots and Decepticons.
- All the Decepticon cultists seen here are Pretenders in the toy line. While they have not received their shells, the Decepticons are drawn so that their robot forms somewhat resemble their Pretender shells. Bludgeon's shell is seen, however — it bears a strong resemblance to his classic look, but has visible tank treads and turrets, suggesting it can transform into a tank.
- In Prime's flashback to Megatron rousing him in issue #1, it appears that the Matrix is semi-visible under Prime's cracked chest plate.

=== Trade paperback ===
The trade paperback (TPB), originally slated for release in November 2006, was eventually released in February 2007, while a pocket sized "Manga" volume was released in April 2007. The TPB includes all the wraparound covers used throughout the series and some additional art by artist Don Figueroa. Included are robot and alternate modes for Optimus Prime, Megatron and Bludgeon, all of which were only seen in robot mode in the series. Concept art (in both modes) was included for Iguanus and Bomb-Burst. In addition, art was included for several characters not featured in the series such as Cosmos (robot mode), one of the Seekers (with 2 different robot and alternate modes) and Astrotrain (3 modes).
