= Dragon's Claws =

Science fiction comic book

- Dragon's Claws (clockwise from left - Digit; Steel; Dragon; Mercy; Scratch; Scavenger) on the cover of Dragon's Claws #7, art by Geoff Senior

Series publication information
- Schedule: Monthly
- Format: Ongoing series
- Genre: Science fiction
- Publication date: June 1988 - April 1989
- Number of issues: 10

Creative team
- Writer(s): Simon Furman
- Artist(s): Geoff Senior
- Letterer(s): Richard Starkings
- Colorist(s): Steve White
- Creator(s): Simon Furman; Geoff Senior
- Editor(s): Richard Starkings

Collected editions
- Dragon's Claws: ISBN 1-905239-99-8

Dragon's Claws

Group publication information
- Publisher: Marvel UK
- First appearance: Dragon's Claws #1 (June 1988)
- Created by: Simon Furman; Geoff Senior

In-story information
- Base(s): The Dragon's Nest, London
- Leader(s): Dragon
- Member(s): Digit; Mercy; Scavenger; Steel

Dragon's Claws is a British dystopian science fiction comic book, published by Marvel UK about the eponymous law enforcers. Dragon's Claws first appeared in Dragon's Claws #1 (June 1988), and were created by Simon Furman and Geoff Senior.

Before their career as law enforcers, the Claws had been "the greatest Game players in the world" - the Game was a violent team sport, immensely popular and funded by the governing World Development Council, who had used it to distract the population and reduce civil unrest. Many of the villains appearing in the series also have their roots in the Game.

== Creation ==
After spending much of the seventies as a packaging office for Marvel Comics, Marvel UK had been attempting to find a way of becoming a fully-fledged publisher since the arrival of Dez Skinn as editor-in-chief in 1979. Since then the company has made several attempts to launch its material, generally revolving around the superhero Captain Britain. However, neither Skinn nor successor Paul Neary were able to make this viable. After taking over the post, Ian Rimmer shored up Marvel UK with successful comics based on licensed franchises such as Transformers, ThunderCats, Zoids and The Real Ghostbusters, mixing reprints of American material with British creations. Rimmer also had ambitions for success in other areas, including with the older readership dominated by 2000 AD and the lucrative American market. Simon Furman, writer on Transformers, was also eager to branch out and created Dragon's Teeth, set in a dystopian 8162, partly inspired by the growing global awareness brought on the writer by Live Aid. Furman drew on several popular films for the concept and characters, including Rollerball, The Warriors and The Evil Dead, while also blending in British humour from the likes of the Carry On film series. Furman picked Senior, a fan-favourite on Transformers with a reputation for dynamic action, to draw the series.

== Publication history ==
Shortly before publication, the name of the title had to be changed when it was found a small press comic company called Dragon's Teeth existed; instead, the Marvel UK title was renamed Dragon's Claws, though the planned name had already featured in some publicity for the book. The regular series began in June 1988, and ran for ten issues before being cancelled due to low sales, due partly to the British market being unable to support the title. Each issue also included a fact file on a character from the series, called the "N.U.R.S.E. Reloc File".

Furman has claimed the book's format contributed to the poor sales of Dragon's Claws and fellow titles Death's Head; at the time British speciality comic stores were rare and most sales were through newsagents' children's sections. These were generally filled with larger magazine-format publications, and Furman felt stores didn't know how to physically stock the title. The characters also appeared in the fifth issue of Death's Head's title, published in the same month as Dragon's Claws #7; this appearance was drawn by Bryan Hitch rather than Senior.

Following the book's cancellation the characters went into obscurity until a brief reappearance in 2004, when Furman and Paul Ridgon created a single-page epilogue for the 2004 edition of the charity project Just One Page. The entire Dragon's Claws series was subsequently reprinted by Panini Comics (Marvel's British licensee since Marvel UK's collapse in the 1990s) in a trade paperback in 2008, including a colour version of the Just One Page strip, with a new cover by Senior

== Plot ==
Greater Britain is a desolate place, where the population was kept docile by watching The Game. The exact nature of the Game is only hinted at, but it involves team members trying to get to a certain part of various ruined cityscapes, with the opposing team members trying anything to stop them. It was used as an opiate for the masses, to ease unrest about global concerns as the Earth moves closer to the Sun. By 8162 the Game was banned due to concerns about the levels of violence involved, but many of the teams - typically made up of hardened psychotic criminals - are now threats to society.

Dragon - one of the most successful players, with his team Dragon's Claws - is having trouble adapting to civilian life with his wife, Tanya, whom he lives with on a farm. He is contacted by Deller, an agent of N.U.R.S.E [National Union of Retired Sports Experts], who offers him, and his old team, the Claws, a role as government enforcers. Dragon initially declines, but when the farm is attacked by another former team, The Wildcats, he changes his mind. Unknown to him, the Wildcats have been hired by Deller for this purpose. A subplot dealt with the brother of a deceased Wildcat seeking vengeance against Deller, which resulted in Dragon's family being kidnapped when they were mistaken for Deller's family. Dragon is reunited with the other Claws – Mercy (an ex-vigilante), Steel (a samurai honour-bound to Dragon since the latter saved his life in the Tokyo Riots of 8156), Digit (who has a computerised brain), and Scavenger (to quote, "No-one quite knows who or what Scavenger is..."), and they are given a brief to stop the many former game teams who are causing trouble. Among these were The Jesters, The Vanishing Ladies, Split Infinity and the Jones Boys, but the recurring threat was the Evil Dead, led by Dragon's old nemesis Slaughterhouse.

Other adversaries were the mechanoid freelance peace-keeping agent Death's Head, who was hired by the surviving members of the Evil Dead, and was heavily damaged when he clashed with Dragon. He was believed to destroyed but was instead rebuilt by Spratt, and attacked the team again when hired by the Chain Gang to capture Scavenger. However, as Death's Head was developing a begrudging respect for Dragon and his team he allowed his contract to lapse.

While the Claws believed they were doing well as law enforcers they were being manipulated by N.U.R.S.E, who was revealed to be involved in corrupt dealings and had reformed the Claws as "bully-boys" to take out and intimidate any gang that challenged N.U.R.S.E. They deliberately kept Dragon from his family so he won't question his orders, eventually sending Deller to kill Dragon's wife; he was unable to do it; however, his presence led to the family being abducted by another rogue Game team, Shrine, who believed they were Deller's family and who had a grudge against him. Dragon eventually teamed up with Slaughterhouse and Deller in overcoming N.U.R.S.E's corrupt kingpin Matron.

With N.U.R.S.E. closed down and the Claws directly under the control of the World Development Council, Dragon elected to stay on leading the Claws, with Deller now as part of the team. Dragon was still unaware of much of Deller's part in the N.U.R.S.E. conspiracy, while the fate of his wife Tanya - last seen in a burning building - is unknown.

== Characters ==
The members of Dragon's Claws are:

- Dragon: team leader; raised in an orphanage and showing great athletic and combat promise, Dragon was drawn to the Game. A tragedy involving his first team, the Courtland Rangers, caused Dragon to quit and lead ex-mercenaries in war-torn Sudan. Injured and subsequently rehabilitated, he returned to the Game to form his team, Dragon's Claws. The team was top of the league within six years before they quit in 8156, due to escalating violence in the Game. He has a wife Tanya and an adopted son Michael, although his family is estranged as a consequence of Dragon's return to the Claws. He is experienced in armed and unarmed combat is driven by a sense of morality and is respected even by his bitter enemies.
- Mercy: daughter of a wealthy industrialist, Mercy Connaught became a vigilante after her father's murder. As part of her search for her father's killer, she joined a minor league Game team, The Equalizers. After finally killing her father's murderer, she was arrested but surrendered into Dragon's "protective custody", winning a place on his team. Mercy generally fights with knives but will use guns or other weapons when required.
- Steel: Shonin Ikeda, a Japanese strongman-samurai. Born in Kobe with a hyperactive system that transforms nutrients into muscle. After witnessing the death of his Yakuza warlord's father, Steel joined up with Dragon when the latter saved his life in the Tokyo riots of 8156. Steel is a skilled swordsman with a strong sense of honour.
- Digit: the team techie. A Scottish highlander possessing an exceptionally high IQ, Gan Ayerson became a leading expert on computers until he was found seriously injured in a Game arena. His life was saved by his technology, his eyes and brain now computerised and his intellect greatly enhanced, at a cost to his humanity. While not physically strong he has back-mounted firepower, which includes a taser, energised baton, and gas dispenser.
- Scavenger: A mysterious and versatile fighter, Scavenger is assumed to be of aboriginal descendency from the 'Austro-Zealand crosslands'. He was believed to have worked as a fence for sky pirates in the North of England before fighting in the 'Tunnel Wars' beneath Birmingham until taken prisoner and sent to the Chaney maximum security prison, which collapsed into a fault line soon after. Scavenger became a lifeline for the other inmates, who suffered from agoraphobia, and during one of his supply runs he rescued Dragon from another Game team, The Jesters. Ultimately abandoning the Chain Gang, Scavenger joined Dragon's Claws. During the team's mission to Channel City, he found and adopted a mongrel dog, Scratch.

== Collected editions ==
Title	ISBN	Release date	Issues
Dragon's Claws	9781905239993	6 October 2008	Dragon's Claws #1-10, Death's Head #2

== Reception ==
Ed Sample gave Dragon's Claws #4 a neutral review for Amazing Heroes, feeling that while the title was competent there was little about it to grab the interest.
