= Transformers: Beast Wars (comics) =

Comic book series

Beast Wars

Publication information
- Publisher: IDW Publishing
- Schedule: Monthly
- Format: Limited series
- Publication date: February–May 2006
- No. of issues: 4
- Main characters: Maximals, Predacons

Creative team
- Written by: Simon Furman; Ben Yee (Sourcebook)
- Artist: Don Figueroa

Transformers: Beast Wars is the name of several comic book series by IDW Publishing. It is based upon Hasbro's toy line and the original television series.

The first two series is set in-continuity with the television series, but also uses characters that were made into toys but not featured in the series. The first miniseries, The Gathering, was released between February and May 2006. The second miniseries, The Ascending, was a direct sequel and debuted in October 2007.

== Publication history ==
=== 2006–2008 ===
After Beast Machines finished airing in 2000, there was no official revisiting of the Transformers continuity established by the Beast Wars animated series until after publisher Dreamwave Productions acquired the rights to the Transformers comic franchise from Hasbro. Although the Transformers convention Botcon created several storylines external to the Beast Wars continuity (such as The Wreckers and a continuation of Beast Machines entitled Transformers: Universe) as various comic book miniseries, the canonicity of such stories is disputable. Dreamwave first touched on the Beast Wars series with a prequel in 2003's Transformers: More Than Meets The Eye. In 2004, the publisher's Transformers Summer Special featured Ain't No Rat, which was the first officially approved comic story to carry on directly from the events seen in the final Beast Wars cartoon. Dreamwave held a contest to select which Transformers continuity (Beast Wars or Robots in Disguise) would be the next to get its own book, and Beast Wars was the victor, with writers James McDonough and Adam Patyk and artist Don Figueroa as the initially planned creative team for the new series. However, despite several pieces of artwork being released (and according to those involved with the project some impressive pieces remaining unreleased), Dreamwave's bankruptcy caused the end of the series before it began.

The story Dreamwave tried to produce will most likely remain lost, and it was not until 2006, when IDW began publishing Beast Wars: The Gathering, that the Beast Wars continuity was again officially revisited.

With the second series, The Ascending, climaxing with Megatron's return to Cybertron, it seems that further Beast Wars stories seem unlikely. However, writer Simon Furman has not ruled out a return, noting that stories could have taken place during Megatron's takeover, before Optimus Primal and the Maximals returned.

=== 2021 ===
In May 2020, IDW's former President Chris Ryall and editor-in-chief John Barber announced a new Beast Wars comic book in development. In October 2020, IDW officially announced a new comic book series titled Transformers: Beast Wars, which will be written by Erik Burnham and drawn by Josh Burcham.

Burnham says that "Beast Wars was a wonderful and weird pivot from the Transformers setup to which I was first introduced. Big personalities, unexpected twists, and actual stakes all popped up regularly on the show, and those are tools that I enjoy using to build new stories. Best of all, the enthusiasm from everyone involved in this project has been so high that I'm feeling constantly inspired!"

Burcham says that "I'm so thrilled to be a part of this team. I was a '90s kid and even though I knew about Generation 1, Beast Wars was really my G1. It's still my favorite iteration, and I consider it such a privilege to be able to bring the characters to life in this brand new series. Let the Beast Wars rage on!"

IDW editor David Mariotte says that "Beast Wars is a beloved part of the Transformers legacy. That's why we couldn't pass up launching a new series in tandem with the 25th anniversary! Erik and Josh are going to take everything that’s beloved about Beast Wars — the characterization, the drama, the jokes — and start fresh with a series that will feel at home for fans of 25 years and first-timers alike."

== Publications ==
=== Main issues ===
==== Beast Wars: The Gathering ====
Transformers: Beast Wars

Publication information
- Publisher: IDW Publishing
- Schedule: Monthly
- Format: Limited series
- Publication date: February–May 2006
- No. of issues: 4
- Main character(s): Maximals, Predacons

Creative team
- Created by: Hasbro
- Written by: Simon Furman
- Artist: Don Figueroa
- Colorist: Josh Burcham

Transformers – Beast Wars: The Gathering is a four-issue comic book mini-series. The series was launched with #1 in February 2006 and ended with #4 in May. It has since been republished as a trade paperback. The story is set in the continuity of the animated series. According to writer Simon Furman, the mini-series is set during the events of the season three episode, "Changing of the Guard". The four-issue series was written by Simon Furman with art by Don Figueroa.

The plot begins with a brief recap of seasons 1-2 of Beast Wars, ending with Ravage's failure to contain Megatron. At this point Predacon general Magmatron arrives with a crew of followers, having been dispatched by the Tripredacus Council to follow up on the former Decepticon. However, displaced from the timestream by a chronal armband, Magmatron has his own agenda: to use a Predacon shell program to turn the Axalon's cargo of Maximal protoforms into an army who he can use to overthrow the existing status quo on Cybertron. However, he is betrayed by his technical expert Razorbeast, in reality a Maximal double agent sent by Lio Convoy to thwart Magmatron's plan, and many of the protoforms retain their original faction programming as Maximals. Razorbeast gathers a small band of Maximals, surviving an attack by Magmatron's divide-and-conquer-themed beast mode of three beasts and gathering a transwarp receiver to get a signal back to Cybertron from Ravage's ship (destroyed in The Agenda pt 3), before heading for the Ark.

Magmatron, meanwhile, has realised his plan is not working, and resurrects Ravage in a new Transmetal 2 body to hunt Razorbeast's group down after he leaves. To divert suspicion, he engages Megatron as his mission requires, starting with a stealthy unconsciousness device jab to knock Megatron out and bring him into his captivity for bringing back to Cybertron, Megatron quickly noticing this effort and, in response, quickly disarming Magmatron of his device. Megatron gains the upper hand but is knocked out by Drill Bit and Iguanus who knock him out themselves with their devices while Megatron is distracted, thereby doubling Megatron's unconsciousness, and they prepare to take him back to present day Cybertron. Leaving the others to cobble together a signal booster from the Ark, Razorbeast and Optimus Minor head to stop him, realising if Magmatron gets back to Cybertron there will be no telling what he'll do. The two hope for a distraction to allow them to sabotage Magmatron's time-travel equipment, and get one as Grimlock arrives on the scene. Grimlock and Magmatron battle, with Grimlock eventually being defeated. Razorbeast reveals himself to Magmatron, but uses his time armband to safeguard himself via chronal displacement back and forth from Magmatron's attacks. He knocks Magmatron into the equipment just as it is about to initiate its transwarp of Magmatron and Megatron back to present day Cybertron as planned and Magmatron, via Razorbeast blasting the equipment at the same time of the transwarp starting, disappears due to the transwarp, while coming into effect, being tampered with by Razorbeast's coincidental destruction of the equipment. Meanwhile, B'Boom and the others have been discovered by Ravage's Predacon forces. Outnumbered and outgunned, they are saved by reinforcements led by Torca, forcing Ravage his forces to flee, although the signal booster has sent its message but burnt out. In the resolution, Razorbeast and Prowl (Transmetal II owl) converse on the ethics of leaving Megatron where he was and not altering the timeline, Razorbeast imagining that altering the timeline would furfill his belief of Megatron's threat being stopped forever while a potential opportunity he saw was available, Prowl informing him that leaving things in the current Beast Wars as they are meant to be was a wise decision, while Ravage and the other surviving Predacons regroup.

The trade paperback was released in August 2006, while a pocket sized "Manga" volume was released in March 2007. The TPB includes all of artist Don Figueroa's covers used throughout the series and some additional art by Figueroa. Included are pre-beast-mode Cybertronian bodies for Magmatron (tank, jet and submarine), Spittor (walker) and Manterror (Cybertronian motorbike), as well as sketches of Optimus Primal in his "Optimal Optimus" form (gained in episode 1 of the television series' third and final season, "Optimal Situation").

==== Beast Wars: The Ascending ====
Transformers: Beast Wars

Publication information
- Publisher: IDW Publishing
- Schedule: Monthly
- Format: Limited series
- Publication date: October 2007 – January 2008
- No. of issues: 4
- Main character(s): Maximals, Predacons

Creative team
- Created by: Hasbro
- Written by: Simon Furman
- Artist: Don Figueroa
- Colorist: Josh Burcham

Transformers – Beast Wars: The Ascending is a four-issue comic mini-series, and a sequel to the mini-series Beast Wars: The Gathering.Scenes on Earth take place around the conclusion of the third season of the Beast Wars animated series, while scenes on Cybertron take place prior to Megatron's return and the events of Beast Machines.

After his defeat at the end of The Gathering, Magmatron finds himself trapped outside time, and witnessing a horrific future in which the evil Unicron consumes Cybertron after turning its inhabitants against each other with his Angolmois energy. Realizing that the only hope for stopping him is for the Maximals and Predacons on Earth to become involved, he reaches out and helps Razorbeast's message to Lio Convoy reach its destination. As he does this, the Maximals under Razorbeast and the Predacons under Ravage continue to do battle, with the Predacons launching a massive offensive against the Maximals' primitively constructed base. The reason for this is soon revealed: Ravage seeks to obtain one of the devices that will allow him to bring him back into synch with the normal flow of time so that he can free Megatron and form an alliance with him. Lio and his subordinates, a Maximal black ops unit known as the Pack, receive Razorbeast's message and depart for Earth, unaware that the evil Shokaract is growing stronger through the power of Unicron's lifeforce, the dark energy known as Angolmois.

Sensing Magmatron's interference, the yet disembodied Unicron orders his loyal minions, the Blendtrons, to put a stop to the new threat and continue preparations for his "Ascending." While the Maximals and Predacons continue to battle on Earth, Magmatron makes contact with Ravage and informs him of their desperate circumstances. Back on Cybertron, the Maximal Council of Elders note that Cybertron is growing increasingly chaotic, and send word to Big Convoy to investigate the situation. Convoy and his squad discover that the Angolmois energy, being distributed like a black-market drug, is to blame. Elsewhere-and when-Lio Convoy and the pack arrive on prehistoric Earth with Beast Modes, arriving just in time to turn the tide for the Maximals. Ravage then approaches them for a truce, only for the first of the Blendtrons-Rartorata-to arrive and inject Razorbeast with Angolmois, mutating him into a savage version of himself. Back on Cybertron, Big Convoy's forces locate Shokaract's hidden lair, and the would be god sets out to challenge them.

On Earth, the enraged Razorbeast proceeds to attack his former compatriots and enemies alike, while the Predacons attack Rartorata. Magmatron, observing events on Cybertron, witnesses Big Convoy's valiant-but futile-last stand against Shokaract, culminating in the Maximal commander's demise in the timeline where Magmatron's efforts to unite the combatants on Earth fail. Back on Earth, a reluctant truce is formed, and half the combatants capture Rartorata to examine him while the Maximals try to subdue and awaken Razorbeast. Succeeding in both endeavors, Lio gathers all combat-worthy Cybertronians to return home to face Shokaract, only for Elephorca and Drancron to appear to aid their comrade. Breaking free of his bonds, Razorbeast then charges the attackers, giving the attack party room to depart. Ravage then reveals to Lio a prize taken from Rartorata: the Angolmois virus, which he hopes can be reverse-engineered to create a cure. They arrive back on Cybertron, but so too arrive Shokaract's Heralds, bearing with them more Angolmois to complete his transformation.

As Shokaract's Heralds spread terror across Cybertron to feed their master, Big Convoy's team is joined by the scientist Bump and the reinforcements from Earth. After a tense meeting, Ravage departs to speak with Magmatron, who instructs him to find a means of bringing Shokaract into his limbo so that he may reveal what Shokaract does not know: that Unicron is using him. Back on Earth, Razorbeast continues to battle the Blendtrons alone, until the wounded Maximals and Predacons left behind with him are inspired to join the fight. Their comrades on Cybertron attack Shokaract en masse, prompting Shokaract to summon his Heralds, unaware that Ravage is preparing an ambush. On Earth, the Blendtrons are dispatched, but Razorbeast's possessed body turns on the Maximals and Predacons, forcing Optimus Minor to strike it down. On Cybertron, Shokaract is sent outside time, where Magmatron shows him his true role in Unicron's plan. As his Heralds fall on Cybertron, Shokaract rips his Anti-Matrix from his body, defying Unicron's will and destroying himself, which sends Magmatron back to Cybertron. The Maximals then prepare to bring order back to their damaged world, unaware that their next threat has beaten Optimus Primal's team back home-Megatron has returned.

=== Special issues ===
- Beast Wars: Sourcebook #1–4, written by Simon Furman and Ben Yee, October 2007–February 2008

=== Collections ===
- Beast Wars: The Gathering, trade paperback, August 2006
- Beast Wars: The Gathering Manga, trade paperback, March 2007
- Beast Wars: The Ascending, trade paperback, February 2008
- Beast Wars: Sourcebook, trade paperback, May 2008
