= The Transformers: All Hail Megatron =

Comic book story arc

Publication information
- Publisher: IDW Publishing
- Format: Limited series
- Genre: Science fiction
- Publication date: July 2008 – October 2009
- No. of issues: 16
- Main character(s): Autobots; Decepticons

Creative team
- Written by: Shane McCarthy

The Transformers: All Hail Megatron was a story arc in The Transformers from IDW Publishing. Written by Shane McCarthy and drawn by Guido Guidi, it was first published in 2008.

== Summary ==
No.	Title	Release date	ISBN
01	The Transformers: All Hail Megatron #1	July 10, 2008	—
Artist: Guido Guidi; New York City suddenly comes under attack from a horde of giant transforming robots; although the city's residents initially think it is some sort of stunt or movie project, the Constructicons prove them wrong when they start firing into the crowds. They are presently joined by Starscream, Thundercracker, and Skywarp; Starscream's boasts of his combat prowess are quickly silenced when Megatron arrives and destroys a skyscraper in one shot. The military attempts to intervene, but Soundwave scrambles the fighter pilots' missiles and the Decepticons easily destroy them. As Megatron stands victorious in the city's flaming ruins, the Autobots are stranded on Cybertron and despair as Ratchet works desperately to save the dying Optimus Prime.
02	The Transformers: All Hail Megatron #2	August 20, 2008	—
Artist: Guido Guidi; Although the military attempts to respond to the Decepticon attack, their efforts are met with little success: Commander Andy Reid saves a woman from Ravage as forces led by Colonel Daniel "Sparkplug" Witwicky gather in Central Park to engage the enemy. Unfortunately, Soundwave deploys Frenzy to deal with them, who incapacitates all the soldiers with an intense infrasonic frequency before killing them. As Starscream, Thundercracker, and Blitzwing destroy the Brooklyn Bridge, Reid encounters a large group of civilians attempting to escape through the subway tunnels, but the Constructicons merge into the monstrous combiner Devastator and collapse the tunnels.
03	The Transformers: All Hail Megatron #3	September 17, 2008	—
Artist: Guido Guidi; Astrotrain destroys a subway station and all the refugees inside as Colonel Witwicky begins receiving reports that the Decepticons are attacking other cities across the United States, including Los Angeles and San Diego. The surviving military officials despair upon learning that the United States Navy has been scuttled, Washington, D.C. has fallen, and Starscream has brought Air Force One down upon the steps of the Lincoln Memorial. As the Constructicons begin building something in the ruins of New York City, Megatron discusses the Autobot traitor who allowed them to so effectively conquer the United States and commends Starscream on his embodiment of the Decepticon cause. A bored Rumble and the Reflector trio miss a group of human refugees led by Reid, who steal supplies and take shelter in a subway station. Unfortunately, Astrotrain arrives and collapses the station, killing all inside.
04	The Transformers: All Hail Megatron #4	October 22, 2008	—
Artist: Guido Guidi; Megatron proclaims that Earth has fallen to the Decepticons as tensions rise among the Autobots stranded on Cybertron, unable to transform. Prowl and Ironhide get into a fight over whether Mirage is the traitor and about a secret that Jazz is hiding from them. Jazz sends Ironhide away to cool off while Bumblebee and Wheeljack unsuccessfully search for Energon across Cybertron's blasted landscape. The two Autobots encounter a shadowy figure and summon Cliffjumper and Ironhide for assistance; as the surviving groups of humans argue over leadership, the figure is revealed to be Hot Rod, who states that his team of Autobots were shot down over Cybertron and have come seeking assistance.
05	The Transformers: All Hail Megatron #5	November 26, 2008	—
Artist: Guido Guidi; Hot Rod reunites with the other Autobots and explains how their ship, the Trion, was shot down by Decepticon battlecruisers; they looted the ship of its Energon and fled looking for other survivors, but they are unexpectedly joined by a third group of Autobots led by Kup. Colonel Witwicky orders his son Commander Spike Witwicky to kill Megatron, but his team is ambushed by Ratbat and presumably slaughtered. Kup attempts to criticize Jazz's leadership but is silenced when Jazz takes down Springer and Blurr and reveals the invisible Mirage hiding among his crew. Jazz allows Kup to see Optimus Prime's unconscious body and confirms that Megatron stole the Matrix of Leadership, while Commander Witwicky is revealed to have survived Ratbat's assault. First appearance: Drift
06	The Transformers: All Hail Megatron #6	January 2, 2009	—
Artist: Guido Guidi; Kup and Jazz agree to combine their forces, with Jazz assuming the position of second in command under Kup despite Prowl's protestations. On Earth, Megatron relaxes in the Israeli desert while reflecting on a conversation with Starscream, and Skywarp and Bombshell get into a disagreement in Beijing over Megatron's seeming favoritism towards the Constructicons. The two summon Thundercracker, Kickback, and Shrapnel to assist them, and the Seekers force the Insecticons to retreat, though Skywarp soon leaves as well, discontented with the current lull in the Decepticon invasion. Kup decides not to tell the other Autobots about the missing Matrix of Leadership and orders that fixing Optimus be their top priority; as Drift and Perceptor dispatch an Insecticon swarm scout, Blitzwing finds Megatron easily fending off an attack from Israeli military forces while the remaining world leaders, sheltering in Versailles, France, decide to destroy New York City with a nuclear bomb.
07	The Transformers: All Hail Megatron #7	February 4, 2009	—
Artist: Guido Guidi; In a series of flashbacks, Jazz tells Kup, Perceptor, and Roadbuster how Optimus’ Autobots were banished to Cybertron: as the Autobots and Decepticons continued fortifying their territories on Earth, Mirage delivered news of an apparent power schism between Megatron and Starscream dividing the Decepticons. After seemingly verifying the information, Optimus decided to lead a full-frontal assault on Starscream's faction; however, the division was a ruse, and the Autobots were ambushed and routed by the united Decepticon forces, including the three primary Insecticons and Devastator. Megatron beat Optimus into submission and stole the Matrix, then revealed that a traitor in the Autobot ranks sealed their fate before exiling them to Cybertron. Decepticons Dirge and Deluge were accidentally abandoned with them, and the Autobots left them at the mercy of the ravenous Insecticon swarm. In the present, Sideswipe and his brother Sunstreaker argue over his Headmaster partnership with the human Hunter O'Nion while Ironhide concludes that Mirage is the traitor. Before anyone can stop him, Ironhide savagely beats Mirage and storms off into the Cybertronian wasteland.
08	The Transformers: All Hail Megatron #8	March 11, 2009	—
Artist: Guido Guidi; A furious Kup berates Ironhide for incapacitating Mirage; the two old soldiers have a heart-to-heart where Kup confesses his own struggles with mental health and concludes Ironhide's lingering guilt from not foreseeing the ambush is influencing him. Outside the Autobot base, the Insecticon swarm finally catches up with them, and Kup orders everyone to stand their ground. On Earth, the Reflector trio torment a group of surviving humans while Starscream secures the Insecticons' loyalty in a coming coup against Megatron. The Autobots prepare to destroy the Insecticon swarm with a series of well-placed explosives, but resident sniper Perceptor is out of commission and Springer remains unable to transform into his helicopter alternate mode. Ironhide confronts Sunstreaker apart from the others, who reveals that he is the Autobot traitor: a burning hatred of humanity after his Headmaster experience led him to cut a deal with Starscream, wherein the Autobots would leave Earth and Starscream would overthrow Megatron and exterminate the human race. Sunstreaker sacrifices himself to destroy the Insecticon swarm in an attempt to make amends, but Drift surmises that Sunstreaker could not have so thoroughly betrayed them. On Earth, it is revealed that Bombshell captured and horrifically disassembled Hunter's biomechanical Headmaster body, implying that the Decepticons gained their advantage from plundering the human's connection to the Autobot systems.
09	The Transformers: All Hail Megatron #9	March 25, 2009	—
Artists: Robert Deas & Emiliano Santalucia; A group of human survivors narrowly escape detection from Soundwave and encounter Spike Witwicky, who offers his assistance in taking down the Decepticon stranglehold on New York City's remains. Mirage refuses to forgive Ironhide while Ratchet briefs Kup on a risky procedure he and Wheeljack have developed that could either restore Optimus or kill him. Spike's group acquires an experimental weapon designed to kill Transformers (itself developed from the fossilized remains of a captive Decepticon), and they dispatch Rumble; a grief-stricken Soundwave accidentally deactivates the communications blackout over New York City, allowing Spike to update his father Sparkplug on their situation. On Cybertron, rising tension over the possibility of Optimus' death cause Sideswipe to snap; he rants that the Autobots deserve to die just as much as the Decepticons for their role in the war, but the revived and fully healed Optimus Prime stops him, who delivers his own speech inspiring his forces to continue fighting. Meanwhile, Spike makes contact with Sparkplug but cannot convince him to call off the nuclear strike.
10	The Transformers: All Hail Megatron #10	April 15, 2009	—
Artists: Guido Guidi and Emiliano Santalucia; Megatron and Bombshell admire the latter's newly constructed space bridge while the former compliments him for his ravenous devotion to both the Decepticon cause and his experiments, including the successful deactivation of the Autobot defenses through the captured Hunter. As Megatron suddenly finds himself surrounded by the other Decepticons at gunpoint, the Autobots prepare for the return of the Insecticon swarm. Ironhide and Optimus reconcile as the swarm attacks while Starscream makes his move against Megatron on Earth; although every Decepticon believed in Megatron's ways at first, they have grown tired of an endless war and want something more, the Insecticons and Constructicons among those that side with the Seeker. The Autobots are overwhelmed by the Insecticon swarm but are unexpectedly saved by the gigantic Autobot Omega Supreme, who received Hot Rod's distress signal and easily dispatched the army of Decepticons sent to take him down. As Omega prepares to transport the Autobots back to Earth, Megatron and Devastator's pitched battle is interrupted by a fleet of European Union fighter jets.
11	The Transformers: All Hail Megatron #11	May 20, 2009	—
Artist: Guido Guidi; As Spike's group watches Devastator attempt to fend off the European jets, Megatron reveals to Starscream that he had both anticipated and encouraged the coup, wanting to remold the Decepticons into a truly destructive force rather than a mindless violent rabble. Megatron assures Starscream that leadership of the Decepticons will one day be his provided he stays loyal, but their conversation is interrupted by the return of the Autobots. A well-timed communications blackout from Blaster leaves the Decepticons vulnerable to Omega Supreme's ambush, and the giant Autobot engages Devastator one-on-one outside the city. Although Sparkplug Witwicky is shocked by the arrival of another group of giant transforming robots, he orders that the nuclear strike continue as Optimus and Megatron face off once again. Megatron brags that his forces have taken control of the nuke and the humans realize that the Decepticons have infiltrated the military; a tank transforms into the Decepticon Dropshot while the nuclear bomber itself is revealed to be Octane.
12	The Transformers: All Hail Megatron #12	June 24, 2009	—
Artist: Guido Guidi; The Autobots and Decepticons continue fighting in New York City's wreckage. Sideswipe attacks the Insecticons to avenge Sunstreaker's death, but Kup saves him from Bombshell and Skywarp. As Omega Supreme takes out both Devastator and the Statue of Liberty, Sparkplug's troops attempt to destroy Dropshot while preparing to retreat from the nuclear bomb's blast radius. Armed with the experimental weapon, Spike's team approaches Optimus and Megatron, deciding to target the Decepticon leader even as the two engage in a physical and philosophical battle about the moral differences between Autobots and Decepticons. Kup saves Sparkplug's team from Dropshot as Megatron orders Octane to proceed with the bombing, but Spike shoots Megatron and Optimus uses the opportunity to end the fight. Starscream assumes command of the Decepticons and orders a retreat, but Thundercracker unexpectedly defects and volunteers to stop the nuke, believing that the Decepticons' actions on Earth have dishonored their cause. The Autobots celebrate their victory as Skywarp furiously shoots Thundercracker for his betrayal. Optimus meets Spike and offers the Autobots' assistance in rebuilding Earth, but Spike declines as a horrified Sideswipe finds Hunter's ravaged body and deactivates his life support machines.
13	The Transformers: All Hail Megatron #13	July 22, 2009	—
Old Ways; Uneasy Lies the Head
Old Ways; Artist: Don Figeuroa; In the aftermath of the battle with the Decepticons, Ironhide and Optimus Prime reflect on their long, rocky relationship: in the early days of the war, Ironhide voices his feelings on the inexperienced Autobot soldiers and Prime's own inexperience as a military leader, and Optimus asks him how to be a better leader rather than disciplining him. In a later battle, Optimus calls for a risky retreat against Ironhide's suggestion to regroup and counterattack, but the latter is proven wrong when Trypticon destroys the area Ironhide had planned to fall back to. Later still, Optimus and Ironhide hang injured from a high ledge; Ironhide asks his leader to drop him and save himself, but Prime refuses, even as the ledge crumbles. In the present day, Optimus reaffirms his faith in Ironhide's no-nonsense command style, convincing his old friend to continue fighting for the Autobots. Uneasy Lies the Head; Artist: Chee Yang Ong; As the Decepticons flee Earth aboard Astrotrain, Starscream announces that Megatron has fallen. In truth, Megatron still functions, but Soundwave and his minions refuse to let their leader expire. Starscream considers his options alone, none of which are viable: if he assassinates Megatron, he fears that the Decepticon leader will somehow return stronger than ever, but if he does nothing, the Decepticons will likely tear themselves apart, and his tenuous position as leader will almost certainly be challenged by others. Left with only the Matrix of Leadership, Starscream uses its cultural and mythical legacy to rally the others around him but privately despairs that his chance of truly leading the Decepticons hinges solely on the powerless Matrix.
14	The Transformers: All Hail Megatron #14	August 19, 2009	—
Replay; Rebirth
Replay; Artist: Emilio Santalucia; As Sunstreaker's disembodied head lies among the ruins of the Insecticon swarm on Cybertron, it replays several key moments from the Autobot's life: after routing a Decepticon force on an alien world with his troops, Sunstreaker was reassigned to Optimus Prime's unite on Earth. Later, after the Machination captured and dismantled him, he attempted to appeal to the scientists’ empathy with little success; one worker, uncomfortable with Sunstreaker's screams, was told off by his superior for considering their prisoner to be a living being, while another ignored his cry for help in favor of forcing him to speak again. Sunstreaker remembers begging Hunter O’Nion to kill him and brushing off Ratchet’s attempt to connect with him after being restored, disgusted by himself and unable to face Hunter or the other Autobots. Rebirth; Artist: Andrew Griffith; On Gorlam Prime, the weakened Cyclonus reflects how he and the other prisoners of the Dead Universe have been marooned on the planet for eternity, slowly withering away until only he and Scourge remain. Before Cyclonus can put his friend out of his misery, Galvatron arrives infused with the power of the Darkness, restoring Scourge and Cyclonus to full strength and remaking the bodies of their fallen comrades into mindless Sweep drones (that, to Galvatron's anger, copy Scourge's appearance rather than his). Although Cyclonus objects to these dishonorable actions, Galvatron convinces him to stand alongside them, and the three undead warriors begin making their own plans for the living universe.
15	The Transformers: All Hail Megatron #15	September 16, 2009	—
Everything in Its Right Place; Lost & Found
Everything in Its Right Place; Artist: Nick Roche; Prowl recalls an interaction he once had with Springer while providing internal narration: the Autobot Triple-Changer attacked him upon discovering that Kup had disappeared from his command, but was silenced upon learning that Perceptor had managed to restore Kup's sanity with some help from the experimental weapons development station Kimia Facility. Although Kup's body appeared to be completely restored, Prowl admitted that Kup's new cy-gar was laced with the radiation he had become addicted to and kept his mind stable (leaving Prowl free to secretly implant his own mental commands inside Kup). Springer nervously welcomed Kup back to the Wreckers as Prowl reflected on the compromises he chose to make to save Kup's reputation and the growing streak of insubordination within Autobots across the chain of command. When Perceptor dryly noted that Prowl's amoral activities meant he himself had gone rogue, Prowl's only response was that he was committed to ending the war – by any means necessary. Lost & Found; Aboard the Trion, Drift and Blurr watch over the damaged Perceptor while reflecting on their lives before the war using the Earth strategy game Go. After 100 games, Kup and Blaster join them and comment on Perceptor's combat-ready self-modifications, including a stronger chest panel and arm stabilizers to improve his aim. Although Kup objects, stating that Perceptor is more useful in the laboratory, the Trion receives a distress signal from Hot Rod, who is currently being pursued by Bludgeon. The Autobots arrive in time to save Hot Rod but are met by the Decepticon combiner Monstructor; to everyone's shock, Perceptor saves them by sniping the precise joint where the six Decepticons fuse together, toppling the giant and sending the Decepticons running. Impressed, Kup orders Perceptor to help him chase their retreating enemies.
16	The Transformers: All Hail Megatron #16	October 14, 2009	—
The Man of Steel; Hidden
The Man of Steel; Artist: Guido Guidi; Spike Witwicky, recovering from injuries sustained when Ravage ambushed him after the battle in New York City concluded, meets with a colonel and two United Nations officials. They inform him that the secret organization Skywatch is expanding itself to international heights to protect Earth from further alien attacks. Spike agrees to join them, albeit reluctantly when he learns his father Sparkplug is Skywatch's new leader. Hidden; Artist: Chee Yang Ong; Shortly after routing the Decepticons, Bumblebee finds himself unable to contact the other Autobots and hunted by a group of anti-Cybertronian militia. As he witnesses the severity of both the city's destruction and humanity's hatred of Transformers, he eventually breaks cover to save a group of refugees from a collapsing building. Although the soldiers fire on him, Bumblebee saves all the refugees before collapsing; the soldiers are driven away by Optimus, Ironhide, Ratchet, Hound, and Jazz, who reveal that they were waiting for Bumblebee's empathy to overwhelm him so they could locate and rescue him.
