= Don Figueroa =

Comic book artist and toy designer

- Born: 1974 (age 51–52)
- Area: Penciller
- Notable works: Transformers: The War Within; Beast Wars: The Gathering; The Transformers: Stormbringer

Don Allan Figueroa (born 1964) is a Filipino American comic book artist and toy designer. He is best known for his work on many different Transformers designs, for both the defunct Dreamwave Productions and with IDW Publishing.

== Dreamwave Productions ==
One of Figueroa's projects was to illustrate Dreamwave's first Transformers: The War Within miniseries. In the series, Figueroa was tasked to design new alternate modes for the Generation 1 Transformers, based on the fact that the series is set long before their arrival on Earth. The Transformers: Titanium line of die-cast toys was based on this series.

Figueroa was later brought on to pencil the "Worlds Collide" story arc on the Transformers: Armada comic book series, which featured some G1 Decepticons. He was eventually named as the penciler for the ongoing Generation 1 comic. He also contributed heavily to their More Than Meets the Eye eight-issue volume of character profiles.

== IDW Publishing ==
After Dreamwave went out of business, Figueroa was brought into IDW Publishing's Transformers franchise. At IDW, he worked on Beast Wars: The Gathering, The Transformers: Stormbringer, a comic adaptation of 1986's The Transformers: The Movie, the official 2007 Transformers movie prequel and a Spotlight issue on Optimus Prime. His later work included Beast Wars: The Ascending, a Target exclusive movie prequel comic with Andrew Wildman as well as many of the profiles for the Transformers: Beast Wars Sourcebook profile series.

For a time, Figueroa stopped working on the Transformers comics to pursue other projects, the first of which being a five-part series for IDW titled Zombies: Hunters. He returned to Transformers as a fill-in artist on the third issue of Transformers: Defiance, a prequel to Transformers: Revenge of the Fallen. He also provided line art on the first story in All Hail Megatron: Coda, as well as the Terminator Salvation prequel comic.

Figueroa returned to Transformers full-time as the artist of IDW's ongoing Transformers series.

== Toy designs ==
Figueroa worked with Hasbro on their Transformers: Titanium line of die-cast toys. Figueroa based several designs after his War Within series for Dreamwave, but did not limit himself to those. All-in-all, he created the designs for every six-inch transforming figure in the line, over 12 figures, not including repaints.

After the Titanium line ended, Figueroa worked with Hasbro again on their Transformers: Classics toy-line, creating updated, highly articulated designs for classic Transformers characters. The line has since expanded into the Transformers: Universe line, and continues to put out new toys.
