= Simon Furman =

British comic book writer

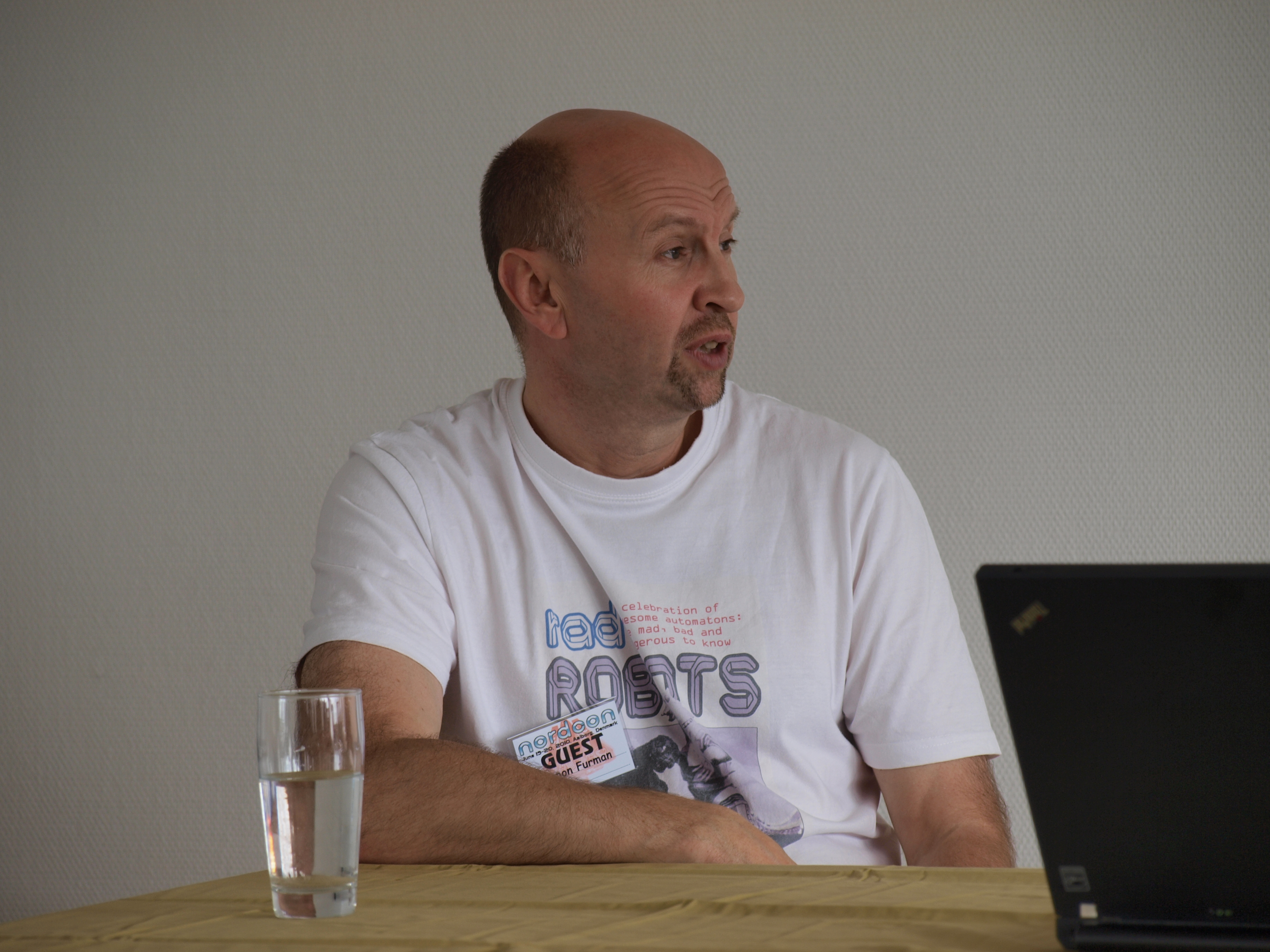
- Born: Simon Christopher Francis Furman; 22 March 1961 (age 65) Carshalton, Surrey, England
- Areas: Writer, Editor
- Pseudonym: Chris Francis
- Notable works: Transformers, Death's Head

Simon Christopher Francis Furman (born 22 March 1961) is a British comic book writer who is best known for his work on Hasbro's Transformers franchise, starting with writing Marvel Comics's initial comic book to promote the toyline worldwide, as well as foundations for both Dreamwave Production's and IDW Publishing's takes on the Generation 1 minifranchise.

== Career ==
Furman was born in Carshalton, Surrey, and had no tertiary education.

Furman is best known for his work on The Transformers comic by Marvel Comics. Furman took over as the writer of the Marvel US Transformers comic after its earlier writer Bob Budiansky decided he had had enough of the comic. Marvel UK, Furman's employer at the time, invited Budiansky over to the UK, and Furman was chosen as Budiansky's successor over a lunch at Covent Garden in London.

Furman started his run in the US comic cautiously at first, but later invented an origin story for the Transformers that involved an ancient struggle between the colossal godlike creator, Primus, and his counterpart, the colossal godlike destroyer, Unicron. The latter was borrowed from the Transformers movie, where he appeared with no given backstory (a conflicting origin for Unicron later came in the third season of the original Transformers cartoon series). According to Furman's origin story, The Transformers were a creation of Primus as a warrior race who were to be the last line of defence against Unicron. This origin differs from the third season of the cartoon series, where the Transformers were originally created to be robot servants of the alien Quintessons, who often sold them to other races.

Aside from the creation myth, mythological underpinnings can be found in several of his stories such as the Matrix Quest storyline, where the Autobots and Decepticons search for the Creation Matrix, a powerful object constructed by Primus.

Furman's Transformers: Generation 2 plot-line in 1993 introduced the characters Jhiaxus and Liege Maximo, one of the first Transformers. Liege Maximo had killed the first Prime to steal the Matrix and claimed that the Decepticons descended from him. Since Transformers Generation 2 was cancelled after 12 issues, the Liege Maximo storyline was concluded in the convention-exclusive novella Alignment.

Over ten years later, Furman was brought in by the now-defunct independent comics publisher Dreamwave to write some of its Transformers comics, including "The War Within", a six issue prequel set on Cybertron before the Autobots and Decepticons took their battle to Earth. It spawned two sequels – "TWW: The Dark Ages" and "TWW: The Age Of Wrath" (uncompleted). His work on the Armada and Energon titles were also received better than the anime series from which they were based on. Furman was to have continued on with Dreamwave, but its contentious closure resulted in the premature end of the Energon and The War Within titles.

Furman has released a novella/comic serial, The Omega Point, which was available only at conventions.

Furman collaborates with regular Marvel UK Transformers artist, Andrew Wildman, as WildFur Productions. Their most recent collaboration was on the Macromedia Flash online, interactive comic The Engine: Industrial Strength, which they produced with UK New Media expert Adam Jennings.

Away from Transformers, Furman wrote a Doctor Who audio adventure for Big Finish. The Axis of Insanity features the Fifth Doctor, and was published in 2004. He also contributed a number of stories starring Judge Dredd to the DC title Judge Dredd: Lawman of the Future, as well as one-off stories to Dredd's home title 2000 AD.

Furman wrote a new continuity of "Generation 1" Transformers comic books for IDW Publishing. Furman likes to tell his stories realistically with maps helping out his locations. Furman often focuses his stories on responsibility. He also wrote a Maximum Dinobots mini-series in 2008.

Furman is also widely known as the co-creator and chief writer of Death's Head. Originally created as a "throwaway character" for use in the UK Transformers series, the character instead received his own series of stories in various comics, becoming a staple of Marvel UK comics in the 1980s and early 1990s. Furman also wrote Dragon's Claws for Marvel UK, and this title crossed over with Death's Head.

Furman's other work at Marvel Comics includes a 2-year run on original Alpha Flight comic book series (where he served as the final writer on the series), a concurrent Northstar mini-series featuring the Alpha Flight team member, a run on Marvel's RoboCop ongoing series in 1991, and the 2006 Annihilation: Ronan mini-series which tied into the Annihilation crossover. In 2006, he returned to writing Death's Head, after a Marvel.com poll contest helped revive the character (now branded Death's Head 3.0) and was thus given a 5-issue storyarc in the Amazing Fantasy anthology series.

In June 2007, he began writing Terminator 2: Infinity, based on Dynamite Entertainment's Terminator 2: Judgment Day license; he produced a sequel, Terminator: Revolution. In the United Kingdom, he did original strips for the first two volumes of Titan Magazines' Transformers Comic UK title, as well as contributing to the strips for Titan's Torchwood magazine.

On 9 April 2011 Furman was one of 62 comics creators who appeared at the IGN stage at the Kapow! convention in London to set two Guinness World Records, the Fastest Production of a Comic Book, and Most Contributors to a Comic Book. With Guinness officials on hand to monitor their progress, writer Mark Millar began work at 9am scripting a 20-page black and white Superior comic book, with Furman and the other artists appearing on stage throughout the day to work on the pencils, inks, and lettering, including Dave Gibbons, Frank Quitely, John Romita Jr., Jock, Doug Braithwaite, Ian Churchill, Olivier Coipel, Duncan Fegredo, David Lafuente, John McCrea, Sean Phillips and Liam Sharp, who all drew a panel each, with regular Superior artist Leinil Yu creating the book's front cover. The book was completed in 11 hours, 19 minutes, and 38 seconds, and was published through Icon on 23 November 2011, with all royalties being donated to Yorkhill Children's Foundation.

In 2019 Furman started his own company, Forged By Fire Productions, for the purpose of publishing a comic, To the Death (co-created with Geoff Senior).

In 2020, his comic Brute Force became the subject of an episode of Marvel 616 on Disney+. Actor and comedian Paul Scheer sets out to have it adapted into a television series for the streaming service, resulting in a 2 minute pilot animated by 6 Point Harness. Furman himself is briefly interviewed by Scheer to explain his reason for working on the comic in the first place.

== Comics ==
Comics work includes:

- Scream! No. 3 (1984)
- The Transformers (UK) #13–21, 29–32, 45–50, 59–65, 74–88, 96–104, 113–120, 125, 130–138, 146–153, 160–161, 164–173, 182–189, 198–205, 213–332
- Doctor Who Magazine #111–113, 117, 130–135, 140
- ThunderCats (UK) No. 10, 30–35
- Action Force (UK) No. 1, 2, 8, 14–17, 24–27, 47–50
- Action Force Monthly #2–6, 8–10, 14
- Action Man: A.T.O.M. (2006)
- Dragon's Claws #1–10
- Death's Head #1–7, 9, 10,
- Death Metal #1–4
- The Transformers (USA) #56–80
- Brute Force #1–4
- RoboCop #12–23
- Sensational She-Hulk #24–27, 47
- Alpha Flight #110–112,114–130
- What If...? Vol.3 #51,53,54,59,64–66,72,74,76
- Transformers: Generation 2 (UK) #1–12
- Northstar #1–4
- Transformers: The War Within vol. 1 #1–6, vol. 2 #1–6, vol. 3 #1–3
- Transformers: Armada #6–18
- Transformers: Energon #19–30
- DOLL (English translation)
- Necrowar #1–3
- Transformers Summer Special Energon story
- The Transformers: Infiltration #0–6
- The Transformers: Stormbringer #1–4
- Beast Wars: The Gathering #1–4
- The Transformers: Spotlight vol.1 #1–5, vol.2 #1,3,4, vol.3 #1,2,4,5
- Amazing Fantasy # 16–20
- Toxic Crusaders Vol. 1
- Jetix Magazine (Writer for the Power Rangers SPD comic strip)
- The Transformers: Escalation #1–6
- Transformers: Movie Prequel #1–4 (with Chris Ryall)
- Terminator 2: Infinity #1–5
- Transformers Comic UK #1-current
- The Transformers: Devastation #1–6
- Beast Wars: The Ascending #1–4
- Beast Wars: Sourcebook #1–4 (with Ben Yee)
- Annihilation: Ronan (4-issue mini-series, Marvel Comics, 2005)
- The Transformers: Revelation #1–4
- The Vigilant (2018-2020)
- To the Death #1–10 (2019)
- Monster Fun Halloween Spooktacular (2021): Furman scripted the first new The Leopard from Lime Street story since 1987 (the story is called "Totem" and was illustrated by Laurent Lefeuvre )

== Television ==
- Beast Wars: Transformers (1999)
- Roswell Conspiracies: Aliens, Myths and Legends (1999)
- X-Men: Evolution (2000–2001)
- Alien Racers (2005)
- A.T.O.M. (2006)
- Legend of the Dragon (2006)
- Matt Hatter Chronicles (2011–2015)

== Sources ==
- Simon Furman at the Grand Comics Database
- Simon Furman at the Comic Book DB (archived from the original)
- 2000 AD profile
