= Transformers: The War Within =

2002–03 comic book miniseries

Publication information
- Publisher: Dreamwave Productions
- Schedule: Monthly
- Format: Miniseries
- Publication date: October, 2002 – December, 2003
- No. of issues: 15
- Main character(s): Autobots, Decepticons

Creative team
- Created by: Hasbro
- Written by: Simon Furman
- Penciller(s): Don Figueroa, Andrew Wildman, Joe Ng
- Inker(s): Elaine To & Don Figueroa
- Colorist: Rob Ruffolo

Transformers: The War Within (or simply TWW and WWi) is a series of comic book mini-series written by Simon Furman and published by Dreamwave Productions featuring Generation One characters with brand new pre-Earth designs.

The series focuses on the Transformers' past on Cybertron before they came to Earth. The series consists of three six-issue mini-series: Volume 1, Volume 2 ("The Dark Ages") and Volume 3 ("The Age of Wrath"). The Age of Wrath ran only for 3 issues due to Dreamwave's bankruptcy.

== Story and background ==
=== Volume One ===
==== Plot ====
The plot revolves around the inception of an archivist named Optronix as leader of the Autobots after the death of their previous leader, Sentinel Prime, at the hands of Megatron. Optronix stands before the Council of the Ancients: a group of beings who maintain a psychic link with and interpret the wishes of the Creation Matrix. The will of the sacred life-force is clear: Optronix is to be the new leader, despite his protests that he is not suitable for the role. However, he is chosen anyway and renamed Optimus Prime, unaware that a group of Autobots led by Grimlock are considering overthrowing Prime if he turns out to be too weak. Prime silences those fears by single-handedly defeating a trio of Decepticon assassins during his inauguration ceremony, but then horrifies the assembled Autobots by declaring the war cannot be won, and that they should evacuate Cybertron. Meanwhile, Megatron has become aware of the potential of the Matrix as a source of power and plans to capture it to power Cybertron's planetary engines, turning it into an interstellar Warworld under his control. The Constructicons fire the engines, devastating Iacon while Shockwave leads an attack on what's left of the Autobots. Prime investigates the engines, but is attacked by Soundwave, Ravage and the Insecticons.

Prowl, realising they can't hold much longer, sends Grimlock to find Prime. Optimus has beaten his pursuers but is confronted by Megatron himself. They battle, and are sent deeper into Cybertron's depths by the ever-traitorous Starscream, who tries to seize command but is opposed by Shockwave. Both Prime and Megatron are pulled into the Matrix and given a glimpse of the future - the events on Earth in Dreamwave's G1 series. Grimlock's team try to shut the engines down as Starscream orders their activation, devastating much of the surface. Grimlock finds Prime and is grudgingly impressed as Prime fights Megatron, trying to prevent him from using the knowledge of the Matrix to cause more evil. Optimus seemingly defeats Megatron and leads a counterattack that routs the Decepticons. Prime resolves to stay on Cybertron and stop the Decepticons, while Megatron is pulled out of the rubble, minus his memory of the events he witnessed within the Matrix, and why he originally wanted it.

=== Volume Two: The Dark Ages ===
==== Plot ====
Set an unspecified period of time after the first series, Prime and Megatron have disappeared in a Space Bridge accident - the Space Bridge they go through that is configured just for one user self-destructs as a result of two going through. Without their leadership, the Autobots and Decepticons have split into smaller factions. Prowl now leads the Autobots, but Grimlock has founded the Lightning Strike Coalition, while Springer has established The Wreckers. Shockwave has taken command of the Decepticons, while Starscream has created the Predacons and Ratbat has established the Ultracons. Into this factional warfare comes The Fallen, a mysterious and ancient Transformer, who joins with one of the smaller Decepticon factions, the Chaos Trinity under Bludgeon, offering to expand their mystical knowledge if they serve him. Meanwhile, the Wreckers and Ultracons clash, and Ratbat reveals his secret weapon: Devastator, the combination of the Constructicons and the first Combiner group ever created - Ratbat unleashes him in flagrant defiance of treaties banning their use by the various factions. The Wreckers are saved from annihilation by the arrival of the Protectobots' combination, Defensor, leading to a clash of the combinations, with the Protectobots seeking to prevent a bloody arms race as everyone tries to acquire Combiners. After a huge battle, Defensor, after Springer tries to make the Protectobots regain control of their combined form, separates; Devastator himself is separated against his will at the hands of the Protectobots using a plug transmission of a powerful shock into his body in a sabotage strategy, and the Ultracons, now foiled, retreat.

The Fallen, with the help of the Chaos Trinity, now begins his plans to acquire four Transformers for a mysterious ritual, manipulating the Autobots into attacking a new Decepticon mobile command base which turns out to be Trypticon, who decimates them with ease. Realising that someone is manipulating them, Jetfire calls a truce with Shockwave to compare notes. They are attacked by the Chaos Trinity, who dispatch Shockwave and capture Jetfire. However, Grimlock, believing that Jetfire has sold out his comrades, then arrives and cuts his way through the acolytes before being beaten senseless by the Fallen and acquired. As the Trinity prepare the ritual by capturing Hot Spot, the Fallen invades the Autobot base to capture Blitzwing who is in lockdown in a capture cell. While the Fallen, now with his four targets secured, prepares to break the Seal of Primus, Shockwave's Decepticons arrive and gun down the Trinity before allying with Prowl's Autobots to deal with the threat. Grimlock and Jetfire also form a truce to prevent the Fallen from completing his ritual and Primus himself kills the Fallen. The various factions agree to seal off the chamber together. Jetfire, however, believes that a bigger threat may appear... as the shadowed shape of Unicron appears in the far distance.

=== Volume Three: The Age of Wrath ===
==== Plot ====
The series is set a short time after The Dark Ages. The defeat of the Fallen has united the Autobots, with Ultra Magnus acting as overall commander. They have pushed back the various Decepticon factions, to the point where peace talks have been agreed between the Autobots and both the Decepticons and Ultracons. Starscream's Predacons are determined to disrupt the talks, attacking the ceremony and killing most of the High Council. However, the other three factions unite to drive them off, with Motormaster gravely wounding Grimlock as he takes a fatal shot meant for Magnus. Afterward, all of the factions are taken by surprise when they are attacked by a huge army of Seeker clones, commanded by none other than Megatron.

As Megatron reunites the Decepticon factions and punishes Starscream for stealing his thunder, Megatron's clones chase down every last Autobot. His forces begin to drill deep into the planet, uncovering a sentient computer network known as the Source, as Perceptor and several other escaped Autobots prepare to fight back. Megatron bargains with the forces who created his army as Nightbeat analyzes a captured clone. Meanwhile, Perceptor sends the Turbomasters to his lab, thinking they can locate the missing Optimus Prime. However, Flash tinkers about with the equipment and is beamed to another world. Dreamwave's closure meant the series was halted at issue #3, but information and images released indicate that Flash would have found Optimus Prime and returned to battle Megatron.

==== Notes ====
- A new miniseries which started in Fall 2004, continuing on from the previous two War Within miniseries. The comic was again written by Simon Furman, and was drawn by Joe Ng. The serial was discontinued after issue #3 due to the bankruptcy of Dreamwave in January 2005.
- Although not named, Megatron's mysterious benefactors are clearly the Quintessons, the creators of the Transformers in the original TV series.

== IDW Publishing ==
After acquiring the rights to the Transformers licence, IDW Publishing reprinted the first volume of War Within in trade paperback format on March 28, 2007, with the second volume following in May.

On February 11, 2009, IDW released The Transformers: War Within Omnibus, which collected volumes 1 and 2 of the series.
