= List of IDW Publishing publications =

IDW Publishing is an American comic book publishing house. They are known, in particular, for the popular horror franchise 30 Days of Night, as well as producing comics based on licensed media, such as G.I. Joe, The Transformers, CSI, Star Trek and Teenage Mutant Ninja Turtles.

== 0–9 ==
Title	Series	Issues	Dates	Notes	Reference
24
24	Cold Warriors	#1	Feb 2008	One-shot	
24	Legacy — Rules of Engagement	#1–5	Apr 2017 – Aug 2017	Limited series	
24	Midnight Sun	#1	Jul 2005	One-shot	
24	Nightfall	#1–5	Oct 2005 – Mar 2006	Limited series	
24	One Shot	#1	Jul 2004	One-shot	
24	Stories	#1	Jan 2005	One-shot	
24	Underground	#1–5	Apr – Aug 2014	Limited series	
3 Devils		#1—4	Mar 2016 – Jun 2016	Limited series	
30 Days of Night	vol. 1	#1–3	Aug – Oct 2002		
30 Days of Night	vol. 2	#1–12	Oct 2011 – 2018		
30 Days of Night	vol. 3	#1—6	Dec 2017 – 2018		
30 Days of Night	30 Days 'Til Death	#1—4	Dec 2008 – Mar 2009	Limited series	
30 Days of Night	Annual 2004	#1	Jan 2004	Annual	
30 Days of Night	Annual 2005	#1	Dec 2005	Annual	
30 Days of Night	Beyond Barrow	#1—3	Sep 2007 – Feb 2008	Limited series	
30 Days of Night	Bloodsucker Tales	#1–8	Oct 2004 – May 2005	Limited series	
30 Days of Night	Dark Days	#1–6	Jun – Dec 2003	Limited series	
30 Days of Night	Dead Space	#1–3	Jan – Mar 2006	Limited series	
30 Days of Night	Eben and Stella	#1–4	May – Aug 2007	Limited series	
30 Days of Night	Night, Again	#1–4	May – Aug 2011	Limited series	
30 Days of Night	Red Snow	#1–3	Aug – Oct 2007	Limited series	
30 Days of Night	Return to Barrow	#1–6	Mar – Aug 2004	Limited series	
30 Days of Night	Scriptbook	nn	Oct 2007	One-shot	
30 Days of Night	Sourcebook	nn	Jan 2007	One-shot	
30 Days of Night	Spreading the Disease	#1–5	Dec 2006 – Apr 2007	Limited series	
The 7th Sword		#1—7	Apr 2014 – Feb 2015	Limited series	

== A ==
Title	Series	Issues	Dates	Notes	Reference
Action Man		#1–4	Jun 2016 – Sep 2016	Limited series	
Action Man	Revolution	nn	Oct 2016	One-shot; Revolution tie-in.	
The Addams Family: The Bodies Issue		nn	Oct 2019	One-shot; movie tie-in.	
The Adventures of Augusta Wind		#1–5	Nov 2012 – Mar 2013	Limited series	
The Adventures of Augusta Wind	The Last Story	#1–5	Aug 2016 – Dec 2016	Limited series	
The Adventures of Digger and Friends		#1–3	Jul 2009 – Nov 2009	Limited series, based on the NASCAR on Fox mascot.	
The Adventures of Simone & Ajax		nn	Feb 2010	Graphic novel	
Afraid of Everything		nn	Apr 2020	Graphic novel	
Airwolf: Airstrikes		nn	Sep 2015	Graphic novel; based on TV series.	
Aleister Arcane		#1–3	Apr 2004 – Jun 2004	Limited series	
All-Ghouls School		nn	Oct 2011	Graphic novel	
Amazing Forest		#1-6	Jan 2016 – Jun 2016	Limited series	
Amber Blake		#1-5	Feb 2019 – Aug 2019	Limited series	
Amelia Cole	and the Enemy Unleashed	nn	Nov 2014	Graphic novel	
Amelia Cole	and the Hidden War	nn	May 2014	Graphic novel	
Amelia Cole	and the Impossible Fate	nn	Sep 2015	Graphic novel	
Amelia Cole	and the Unknown World	nn	Aug 2013	Graphic novel	
Amelia Cole	Versus the End of Everything	nn	Aug 2016	Graphic novel	
American McGee's Grimm		#1-5	Apr 2009 – Sep 2009	Limited series	
America's Army		#0-15	Jun 2013 - Apr 2015	Limited series; based on the video game series.	
American Freakshow: The Terrible Tale of Sloth Boy		nn	Dec 2008	Graphic novel	
Andre the Giant: Closer to Heaven		nn	Nov 2015	Graphic novel	
Angel
Angel	A Hole in the World	#1–5	Dec 2009 – Apr 2010	Limited series	
Angel	Auld Lang Syne	#1–5	Nov 2006 – Mar 2007	Limited series	
Angel	Barbary Coast	#1–3	Apr 2010 – Jun 2010	Limited series	
Angel	Blood and Trenches	#1-4	Mar 2009 - Jun 2009	Limited series	
Angel	Illyria Haunted	#1–4	Nov 2010 – Feb 2011	Limited series	
Angel	Lorne	nn	Mar 2010		
Angel	Masks	nn	Oct 2006	One-shot	
Angel	Not Fade Away	#1–3	May 2009 – Jul 2009	Limited series	
Angel	Old Friends	#1–5	Nov 2005 – Mar 2006	Limited series	
Angel	Only Human	#1–5	Aug 2009 – Dec 2009	Limited series	
Angel	Scriptbook	#1–7	Mar – Sep 2006	Limited series	
Angel	Smile Time	#1–3	Dec 2008 – Apr 2009	Limited series	
Angel	The Curse	#1–5	Jun – Oct 2005	Limited series; first title in the series to be published by IDW.	
Angel	Yearbook	nn	May 2011	Last title in the series to be published by IDW.	
Angel: After the Fall	vol. 1	#1–17	Nov 2007 – Feb 2009	Limited series	
Angel: After the Fall	vol. 2	#18–44	Feb 2009 – Apr 2011	Ongoing series	
Angel: After the Fall	Annual	#1	Dec 2009	Annual	
Angel: Spotlight	Connor	#1	Aug 2006	One-shot	
Angel: Spotlight	Doyle	#1	Jul 2006	One-shot	
Angel: Spotlight	Gunn	#1	May 2006	One-shot	
Angel: Spotlight	Illyria	#1	Apr 2006	One-shot	
Angel: Spotlight	Wesley	#1	Jun 2006	One-shot	
Angel vs. Frankenstein		nn	Oct 2009	One-shot	
Angel vs. Frankenstein	II	nn	Oct 2010	One-shot	
Angry Birds
Angry Birds	Flight School	#1-3	Feb 2017 - Jun 2017	Limited series	
Angry Birds	Game Play	#1-3	Jan 2017 - May 2017	Limited series	
Angry Birds	Mini-Comic	#1-8	Jun 2014 - Sep 2014	Limited series	
Angry Birds	Transformers	#1-4	Nov 2014 - Feb 2015	Limited series	
Angry Birds Comics		#1-12	Jun 2014 - Jun 2015	Ongoing series; based on the video game series.	
Angry Birds Comics	Holiday Special	#1	Dec 2014	One-shot	
Angry Birds Comics Quarterly	Furious Fowl	#1	Aug 2017	One-shot	
Angry Birds Comics Quarterly	Monsters & Mistletoe	#1	Dec 2017	One-shot	
The Angry Birds Movie: Big Movie Eggstravaganza		nn	Apr 2016	One-shot; based on the video game series' 2016 film adaptation.	
Animal Noir		#1-4	Feb 2017 – May 2017	Limited series	
Antar: The Black Knight		#1	Apr 2018		
Arca		#1–		Limited series	
Archangel		#1-5	May 2016 - Jun 2017	Limited series	
The Army of Dr. Moreau		nn	Apr 2015	Graphic novel	
Army of Two		#1-6	Feb 2010 - Jun 2010	Limited series; based on the video game series.	
Ascend: Special Edition		nn	Dec 2007	Graphic novel; written by Keith Arem, with illustrations by Christopher Shy.	
Ashes		nn	Feb 2023	Graphic novel	
Assassinistas		#1–6	Dec 2017 – May 2018	Limited series	
Astro Boy: The Movie	Official Movie Adaptation	#1–4	Aug 2009 – Sep 2009	Limited series; movie adaptation.	
Astro Boy: The Movie	Official Movie Prequel	#1–4	May 2009 – Aug 2009	Limited series; movie tie-in.	
The A-Team: Shotgun Wedding		#1–4	Mar 2010 – Apr 2010	Limited series	
The A-Team: War Stories	B.A.	nn	Mar 2010	One-shot	
The A-Team: War Stories	Hannibal	nn	Mar 2010	One-shot	
The A-Team: War Stories	Face	nn	Apr 2010	One-shot	
The A-Team: War Stories	Murdock	nn	Apr 2010	One-shot	
Atomic Robo	Dawn of a New Era	#1–5	Nov 2018 – Mar 2019	Limited series	
Atomic Robo	The Ring of Fire	#1–5	Sep 2015 – Jan 2016	Limited series	
Atomic Robo	The Spectre of Tomorrow	#1–5	Oct 2017 – Feb 2018	Limited series	
Atomic Robo	The Temple of Od	#1–5	Aug 2016 – Dec 2016	Limited series	

== B ==
Title	Series	Issues	Dates	Notes	Reference
Back to the Future		#1—25	Oct 2015 — Oct 2017	Ongoing series; based on film series.	
Back to the Future	Biff to the Future	#1—6	Jan 2017 — Jun 2017	Limited series	
Back to the Future	Citizen Brown	#1—5	May 2016 — Sep 2016	Limited series	
Back to the Future	Tales from the Time Train	#1—6	Dec 2017 — May 2018	Limited series	
Badger	Bull!	#1	Nov 2007	One-shot	
Badger	Saves the World	#1—5	Dec 2007 — Apr 2008	Limited series	
Baja		nn	Nov 2011	Graphic novel	
Banshee: Origins		nn	Dec 2012	TV tie-in; Extended Version published in June 2013.	
Barack Obama		#1–2	Jun 2009 – Jul 2009	Limited series	
Batman/Teenage Mutant Ninja Turtles	vol. 1	#1–6	Dec 2015 – May 2016	Limited series; co-published with DC Comics.	
Batman/Teenage Mutant Ninja Turtles	Adventures	#1–6	Nov 2016 – May 2017	Limited series; co-published with DC Comics.	
Batman/Teenage Mutant Ninja Turtles	II	#1–6	Feb – Jun 2018	Limited series; co-published with DC Comics; sequel to BM/TMNT I.	
Batman/Teenage Mutant Ninja Turtles	III	#1–6	Jul – Dec 2019	Limited series; co-published with DC Comics; sequel to BM/TMNT I and II.	
Batman/The Maxx: Arkham Dreams		#1–5	Sep 2018 – Nov 2020	Limited series; co-published with DC Comics.	
Battle Beasts		#1–4	Jul 2012 – Oct 2012	Limited series; based on the toy line of the same name.	
Belladonna		#1	Feb 2010	One-shot	
Ben 10		#1–4	Nov 2013 – Feb 2014	Limited series; based on TV series.	
Beowulf		#1–4	Oct 2007	Limited series; movie adaptation.	
Bermuda		#1–4	Jul 2021 – Oct 2021	Limited series	
Beyond the Wall		#1–4	Oct 2009 – Feb 2010	Limited series	
The Bible: Eden		nn	Dec 2003	Graphic novel	
Big Hero 6: The Series		#1	Nov 2019	Limited series; based on TV series.	
Bigfoot		#1–4	Feb – May 2005	Limited series	
The Bigger Bang		#1–4	Nov 2014 – Feb 2015	Limited series	
The Biggest Bang		#1–4	May 2016 – Aug 2016	Limited series; sequel to The Bigger Bang.	
Black Crown Quarterly		#1–4	Oct 2017 – Oct 2018		
Black Dynamite		#1–4	January 15 – November 12, 2014	Limited series; based on the 2009 film of the same title.	
Blood Stained Sword		#1	Jan 2005	One-shot	
Borderlands	Origins	#1–4	November 14, 2012 – February 20, 2013	Limited series; based on the video game series.	
Borderlands	The Fall of Fyrestone; Tannis and the Vault	#1–8	July 16, 2014 – April 22, 2015	Limited series	
Boy-1		#1–4	Aug 2015 – Nov 2015	Limited series	
Bram Stoker's Death Ship: The Last Voyage of the Demeter		#1–4	May 12 – September 1, 2010	Limited series; adaptation of "The Captain's Log", a chapter from the 1897 novel Dracula by Bram Stoker.	
Brooklyn Animal Control		nn	Dec 2015		
Brutal Nature		#1–4	May 2016 – Aug 2016	Limited series	
Brutal Nature	Concrete Fury	#1–5	Mar 2017 – Jul 2017	Limited series; sequel to the original limited series.	
Bubba Ho-Tep and the Cosmic Bloodsuckers		#1–5	Mar 2018 – Jul 2018	Limited series; based on the 2003 film Bubba Ho-Tep.	
Burmese Moons		nn	Sep 2019	Graphic novel	

== C ==
Title	Series	Issues	Dates	Notes	Reference
Cameron and His Dinosaurs		nn	May 2009	Graphic novel	
Canto		#1–6	Jun 2019 – Nov 2019	Limited series	
Canto	& the City of Giants	#1–3	Apr 2021 – Jun 2021	Limited series	
Canto	& the Clockwork Fairies	nn	Jul 2020	One-shot	
Canto	II: The Hollow Men	#1–5	Aug 2020 – Jan 2021	Limited series	
Canto	III: Lionhearted	#1–6	Jul 2021 – Jan 2022	Limited series	
Canto	Tales of the Unnamed World	#1–2	Jun 2022 – Jul 2022	Limited series	
The Cape	vol. 1	nn	Dec 2010	One-shot	
The Cape	vol. 2	#1–4	Jul 2011 – Jan 2012	Limited series	
The Cape	1969	#1–4	Jul 2012 – Oct 2012	Limited series	
The Cape	Fallen	#1–4	Jun 2018 – Dec 2018	Limited series	
Care Bears: Unlock the Magic		#1–3	Jul 2019 – Sep 2019	Limited series; based on the 2019 TV series.	
Cartoon Network Super Sampler		nn	Oct 2013	Promotional comic, published as a part of Halloween ComicFest 2013.	
Cartoon Network: Super Secret Crisis War!		#1–6	Jun 2014 – Nov 2014	Limited series	
Cartoon Network: Super Secret Crisis War!	Codename: Kids Next Door	nn	Nov 2014	One-shot	
Cartoon Network: Super Secret Crisis War!	Cow and Chicken	nn	Oct 2014	One-shot	
Cartoon Network: Super Secret Crisis War!	Foster's Home for Imaginary Friends	nn	Sep 2014	One-shot	
Cartoon Network: Super Secret Crisis War!	The Grim Adventures of Billy & Mandy	nn	Aug 2014	One-shot	
Cartoon Network: Super Secret Crisis War!	Johnny Bravo	nn	Jul 2014	One-shot	
Castlevania: The Belmont Legacy		#1–5	Mar 2005 – Jul 2005	Limited series; based on the video game series.	
Chained to the Grave		#1–5	Feb 2021 – Jun 2021	Limited series	
Chasing the Dead		#1–4	Nov 2012 – Feb 2013	Limited series	
Chiaroscuro	Patchwork Book I	nn	Nov 2007	Single volume collecting the eponymous ongoing series created by Troy Little, which ran from 2000 to 2005 for a total of ten issues.	
Chibi Usagi: Attack of the Heebie Chibis		nn	Jun 2021	Graphic novel	
Chicacabra		nn	Jun 2014	Graphic novel	
Chicanos		#1–8	Nov 2005 – Jun 2006	Limited series	
Children of Aramar		nn	Oct 2019	Graphic novel	
Citizen of the Galaxy		#1–3	Feb 2015 – Apr 2015	Limited series; written by Robert A. Heinlein.	
City: The Mind in the Machine		#1–4	Feb 2014 – May 2014	Limited series	
Classic Popeye		#1–4	Aug 2012 – Dec 2017	Reprint publication of the inaugural Popeye comic series originally written and illustrated by Bud Sagendorf.	
The Claws Come Out		nn	Nov 2007	Graphic novel	
Clive Barker's	Seduth	nn	Oct 2009	One-shot	
Clive Barker's	Next Testament	#1–12	May 2013 – Aug 2014	Limited series	
Clue		#1–6	Jun 2017 – Nov 2017	Limited series	
Clue	Candlestick	#1–3	May 2019 – Jul 2019	Limited series	
Clyde		nn	Apr 2019	Graphic novel	
Cobb: Off the Leash		#1–3	May 2006 – Jul 2006	Limited series	
Cobra Kai: The Karate Kid Saga Continues — Johnny's Story		#1–4	Oct 2019 – Jan 2020	Limited series; based on the streaming TV series.	
Code Word: Geronimo		nn	Sep 2011	Graphic novel	
Codex Black		nn	Apr 2023	Graphic novel	
Cold War		#1–4	Oct 2011 – Jan 2012	Limited series	
The Colonized		#1–4	Apr 2013 – Jul 2013	Limited series	
The Comic Book History of Animation		#1–6	Nov 2020 – Mar 2021	Limited series	
The Comic Book History of Comics	vol. 1	#1–6	Nov 2016 – Apr 2017	Limited series	
The Comic Book History of Comics	vol. 2	#1–4	Dec 2017 – Mar 2018	Limited series; sequel to the first volume.	
Contropussy		nn	Nov 2012	Graphic novel	
Cory Doctorow's Futuristic Tales of the Here and Now		#1–6	Oct 2007 – Mar 2008	Anthology adapted from six short stories by Cory Doctorow: "Anda's Game", "When Sysadmins Ruled The Earth", "Craphound", "Nimby and the D-Hoppers", "I, Robot" and "After the Siege".	
Cosmic Scoundrels		#1–5	Feb 2017 – Jun 2017	Limited series	
Crashing		#1–5	Sep 2022 – Feb 2023	Limited series	
Crawl to Me		#1–4	Jun 2011 – Nov 2011	Limited series	
Creature Cops: Special Varmint Unit		#1–3	Jan 2015 – Mar 2015	Limited series	
Creeple Peeple		#1–3	Jan 2015 – Mar 2015	Limited series	
Criminal Macabre: Final Night – The 30 Days of Night Crossover		#1–4	Dec 2012 — Mar 2013	Limited series; co-published with Dark Horse Comics.	
The Crow	Curare	#1–4	Jun 2013 – Aug 2013	Limited series	
The Crow	Death and Rebirth	#1–5	Jul 2012 – Nov 2012	Limited series	
The Crow	Hark the Herald	nn	Nov 2019	One-shot	
The Crow	Lethe	#1–3	Feb 2020 – Jul 2020	Limited series	
The Crow	Memento Mori	#1–4	Mar 2018 – Jun 2018	Limited series	
The Crow	Pestilence	#1–4	Mar 2014 – Jun 2014	Limited series	
The Crow	Skinning the Wolves	#1–3	Dec 2012 – Feb 2013	Limited series	
The Crow/Hack/Slash		#1–4	Jun 2019 – Sep 2019	Limited series	
Crysis		#1–6	Jun 2011 – Oct 2011	Limited series; based on the video game series.	
CSI	Bad Rap	#1–5	Aug 2003 – Dec 2003	Limited series	
CSI	Demon House	#1–5	Feb 2004 – Jun 2004	Limited series	
CSI	Dominos	#1–5	Aug 2004 – Dec 2004	Limited series	
CSI	Dying in the Gutters	#1–5	Aug 2006 – Dec 2006	Limited series	
CSI	NY - Bloody Murder	#1–5	Jul 2005 – Nov 2005	Limited series	
CSI	Secret Identity	#1–5	Feb 2005 – Jun 2005	Limited series	
CSI	Serial	#1–5	Jan 2003 – May 2003	Limited series	
CSI	Thicker Than Blood	#1	Jul 2003	One-shot	
CSI: Miami	Blood/Money	#1	Sep 2004	Limited series	
CSI: Miami	Smoking Gun	#1	Oct 2003	One-shot	
CSI: Miami	Thou Shalt Not...	#1	Apr 2004	One-shot	
CVO	African Blood	#1–4	Sep 2006 – May 2007	Limited series	
CVO	Artifact	#1–3	Oct 2003 – Dec 2003	Limited series	
CVO	Covert Vampiric Operations	#1	May 2003	One-shot	
CVO	Human Touch	#1	Aug 2004	One-shot	
CVO	Rogue State	#1–5	Nov 2004 – Mar 2005	Limited series	

== D ==
Title	Series	Issues	Dates	Notes	Reference
D4VE	vol. 1	#1–5	Feb 2015 – Jun 2015	Limited series	
D4VE	2	#1–4	Sep 2015 – Dec 2015	Limited series; sequel story.	
D4VEocracy		#1–4	Jan 2017 – Apr 2017	Limited series	
D'Airain Aventure		#1–2	Jan 2007 – Feb 2007	Limited series	
Dampyr		#1–8	Apr 2005 – Dec 2005	Limited series	
Danger Girl	Mayday	#1–4	Apr 2014 – Aug 2014	Limited series	
Danger Girl	Renegade	#1–4	Sep 2015 – Jan 2016	Limited series	
Danger Girl	Revolver	#1–4	Jan 2012 – Apr 2012	Limited series	
Danger Girl	The Chase	#1–4	Sep 2013 – Dec 2013	Limited series	
Danger Girl	Trinity	#1–4	Apr 2013 – Jul 2013	Limited series	
Danger Girl and the Army of Darkness		#1–6	Apr 2011 – Aug 2012	Limited series; co-published with Dynamite Entertainment	
Danger Girl/G.I. Joe		#1–5	Jul 2012 – Nov 2012	Limited series	
Dark Delicacies		#1	Jan 2009		
Dark Spaces	Good Deeds	#1–5	May 2023 – present	Limited series	
Dark Spaces	Wildfire	#1–5	Jul 2022 – Nov 2022	Limited series	
Darkness Visible		#1–6	Feb 2017 – Jul 2017	Limited series; an ashcan copy of the first issue was produced in December 7, 2016.	
Dead Rising: Road to Fortune		#1–4	Oct 2011 – Jan 2012	Limited series; based on the video game series.	
Dead Seas		#1–6	Dec 2022 – May 2023	Limited series	
Dead Squad		#1–5	Oct 2014 – Mar 2015	Limited series	
Dead Squad	Ayala Tal	#1	Jun 2015	One-shot	
Dead, She Said		#1–3	May 2008 – Sep 2008	Limited series	
Deadworld	Restoration	#1–5	Dec 2013 – Apr 2014	Limited series	
Deadworld	The Last Siesta	–	Sep 2011	Graphic novel	
Deadworld	War of the Dead	#1–5	Aug 2012	Limited series	
Delta 13		#1–4	May 2018 – Aug 2018	Limited series	
Demi-God		#1–2	Mar 2018 – Apr 2018	Limited series	
Demons of Sherwood		–	Dec 2009	Graphic novel	
Desperadoes	Banners of Gold	#1–5	Dec 2004 – Apr 2005	Limited series	
Desperadoes	Buffalo Dreams	#1–4	Jan 2007 – May 2007	Limited series	
Deviations	G.I. Joe	–	Mar 2016	One-shot	
Deviations	Ghostbusters	–	Mar 2016	One-shot	
Deviations	Judge Dredd	–	Mar 2017	One-shot	
Deviations	My Little Pony: Friendship Is Magic	–	Mar 2017	One-shot	
Deviations	Orphan Black	#1–6	Mar 2017 – Aug 2017	Limited series	
Deviations	Star Trek	–	Mar 2017	One-shot	
Deviations	Teenage Mutant Ninja Turtles	–	Mar 2016	One-shot	
Deviations	Transformers	–	Mar 2016	One-shot	
Deviations	The X-Files	–	Mar 2016	One-shot	
The Devil's Concubine		–	May 2011	Graphic novel	
The Devil's Rejects		#1	Aug 2005	One-shot; movie tie-in.	
Dexter's Laboratory		#1–4	Apr 2014 – Jul 2014	Limited series; based on the TV series.	
Diablo House		#1–4	Jul 2017 – Dec 2017	Limited series	
Diamond Island		–	Mar 2015	Graphic novel	
Dick Tracy	Dead or Alive	#1–4	Sep 2018 – Dec 2018	Limited series	
Dick Tracy	Forever	#1–4	Apr 2019 – Jul 2019	Limited series	
Dinosaurs Attack!		#1–5	Jul 2013 – Nov 2013	Limited series	
Dirk Gently's Holistic Detective Agency		#1–5	May 2015 – Oct 2015	Limited series; adapted from 1987 novel.	
Dirk Gently's Holistic Detective Agency	A Spoon Too Short	#1–5	Feb 2016 – Jun 2016	Limited series	
Dirk Gently's Holistic Detective Agency	The Salmon of Doubt	#1–9	Oct 2016 – Jun 2017	Limited series	
Disney	Afternoon Giant	#1–8	Oct 2018 – Dec 2019	Ongoing series; bi-monthly publication.	
Disney	Comics and Stories	#1–13 (#744–756)	Sep 2018 – May 2020	Ongoing series	
Disney	Giant Halloween Hex	#1	Oct 2016		
Disney	Magic Kingdom Comics	#1–2	May 2016 – Aug 2016		
Disney	Tsum Tsum Kingdom	–	Sep 2018	One-shot	
Doberman		#1–5	Jul 2014 – Jan 2015	Limited series	
Doc Macabre		#1–3	Dec 2010 – Feb 2011	Limited series	
Doctor Who	vol. 1	#1–16	Jul 2009 – Oct 2010	Ongoing series	
Doctor Who	vol. 2	#1–16	Jan 2011 – Apr 2012	Ongoing series	
Doctor Who	vol. 3	#1–16	Sep 2012 – Dec 2013	Ongoing series	
Doctor Who	A Fairytale Life	#1–4	Apr 2011 – Jul 2011	Limited series	
Doctor Who	Agent Provocateur	#1–6	Jan 2008 – Jun 2008	Limited series; first title in the series to be published by IDW.	
Doctor Who	Autopia	–	Jun 2009	One-shot	
Doctor Who	Black Death... White Life	–	Sep 2009	One-shot	
Doctor Who	Cold-Blooded War!	–	Aug 2009	One-shot	
Doctor Who	Prisoners of Time	#1–12	Jan 2013 – Nov 2013	Limited series	
Doctor Who	Room with a Deja View	–	Jul 2009	One-shot	
Doctor Who	The Forgotten	#1–12	Aug 2008 – Jan 2009	Limited series	
Doctor Who	The Time Machination	–	May 2009	One-shot	
Doctor Who	The Whispering Gallery	–	Feb 2009	One-shot	
Don Pendleton's The Executioner		#1–5	Apr 2008 – Aug 2008	Limited series; adapted from the eponymous book series by Don Pendleton.	
Donald and Mickey		#1–4	Aug 2017 – May 2018	Ongoing series; quarterly publication.	
Donald Duck		#1–21 (#368–388)	May 2015 – Jun 2017	Ongoing series; previously published by Dell, Gold Key, Disney, Gladstone, Gemstone and Boom! Studios and resumed from #367.	
Donald Duck's Halloween Scream!	2015	–	Oct 2015	Halloween ComicFest issues.	
Donald Duck's Halloween Scream!	2017	–	Oct 2017	Halloween ComicFest issues.	
Donald Quest		#1–5	Nov 2016 – Mar 2017	Limited series	
Doomed		#1–4	Oct 2005 – Dec 2006	Limited series	
Doomsday.1		#1–4	May 2013 – Aug 2013	Limited series	
Doorways		#1–4	Nov 2010 – Feb 2011	Limited series; based on the 1991 TV pilot of the same title.	
Doorways to Danger		–	Jul 2021	Graphic novel	
Dorothy of Oz Prequel		#1–4	Mar 2012 – Aug 2012	Limited series; movie tie-in.	
Dracula's Revenge		#1–2	Apr 2004 – May 2004	Limited series	
Dragon Age		#1–6	Mar 2010 – Nov 2010	Limited series; based on the role-playing video game series.	
Dread Gods		#1–4	Jul 2017 – Oct 2018	Limited series	
The Dreamer		#1–6	Oct 2008 – Aug 2009	Limited series	
The Dreamland Chronicles		#1–7	Jul 2008 – Jan 2009	Limited series	
Drive		#1–4	Aug 2015 – Mar 2016	Limited series; adapted from 2005 novel.	
Drones		#1–5	Apr 2015 – Aug 2015	Limited series	
Duck Avenger		#0–5	Aug 2016 – Jun 2017	Limited series	
DuckTales		#0–20	Jul 2017 – Apr 2019	Ongoing series; based on the 2017 reboot of the TV series.	
DuckTales	Faires and Scares	#1–3	Dec 2019 – Feb 2020	Limited series; based on the 2017 reboot of the TV series.	
DuckTales	Silence and Science	#1–3	Aug 2019 – Oct 2019	Limited series; based on the 2017 reboot of the TV series.	
Duke Nukem: Glorious Bastard		#1–4	Jul 2011 – Oct 2011	Limited series; based on the video game series.	
Dungeons & Dragons	vol. 1	#0–15	Aug 2010 – Jan 2012	Ongoing series	
Dungeons & Dragons	Annual 2022	–	August 2022	Annual	
Dungeons & Dragons	A Darkened Wish	#1–5	Feb 2019 – Aug 2019	Limited series	
Dungeons & Dragons	At the Spine of the World	#1–4	Oct 2020 – Jan 2021	Limited series	
Dungeons & Dragons	Dark Sun	#1–5	Jan 2011 – May 2011	Limited series; first miniseries in the IDW Dungeons & Dragons line.	
Dungeons & Dragons	Eberron	Annual 2012	March 2012	Annual	
Dungeons & Dragons	Evil at Baldur's Gate	#1–5	Apr 2018 – Aug 2018	Limited series	
Dungeons & Dragons	Forgotten Realms	#1–5	Apr 2012 – Sep 2012	Limited series	
Dungeons & Dragons	Forgotten Realms: Cutter	#1–5	Apr 2013 – Sep 2013	Limited series	
Dungeons & Dragons	Frost Giant's Fury	#1–5	Dec 2016 – Apr 2017	Limited series	
Dungeons & Dragons	Honor Among Thieves: The Feast of the Moon	–	Mar 2023	Graphic novel; movie tie-in.	
Dungeons & Dragons	Infernal Tides	#1–5	Nov 2019 – Aug 2020	Limited series	
Dungeons & Dragons	Infestation 2	#1–2	Feb 2012	One-shot; Infestation 2 tie-in.	
Dungeons & Dragons	Legends of Baldur's Gate	#1–5	Oct 2014 – Feb 2015	Limited series	
Dungeons & Dragons	Mindbreaker	#1–5	Oct 2021 – Feb 2022	Limited series	
Dungeons & Dragons	Neverwinter Tales: The Legend of Drizzt	#1–5	Aug 2011 – Dec 2011	Limited series	
Dungeons & Dragons	Ravenloft: Orphan of Agony Isle	#1–4	Jun 2022 – Sep 2022	Limited series	
Dungeons & Dragons	Saturday Morning Adventures	#1–4	Mar 2023 – Jun 2023	Limited series; based on TV series.	
Dungeons & Dragons	Shadows of the Vampire	#1–5	Apr 2016 – Aug 2016	Limited series	
Dungeons & Dragons	The Best of Minsc & Boo	–	April 2022	One-shot	
Duostar Racers		#1	May 2008	One-shot	
Dying Is Easy		#1–5	Dec 2019 – Apr 2020	Limited series	

== E ==
Title	Series	Issues	Dates	Notes	Reference
Earthdivers		#1–7	Oct 2022 – Apr 2023		
Easy Way		#1–4	Apr 2005 – Jul 2005	Limited series	
Ed's Terrestrials		nn	September 2008	Graphic novel; co-published with Jonas Publishing under the Worthwhile Books imprint.	
Edge of Doom		#1–5	Oct 2010 – Mar 2011	Limited series	
Edward Scissorhands		#1–10	Oct 2014 – Jul 2015	Limited series; based on the 20th Century Fox film.	
Eight Million Ways to Die: A Matthew Scudder Mystery		nn	Jun 2018	Graphic novel; adapted from the 1982 Lawrence Block novel.	
The Eighth Seal		#1–5	Dec 2015 – Apr 2016	Limited series	
The Electric Sublime		#1–4	Oct 2016 – Jan 2017	Limited series	
Elenora Mandragora, Daughter of Merlin		nn	Nov 2017	Graphic novel	
Empire: Uprising		#1–4	Apr 2015 – Jul 2015	Limited series	
Epilogue		#1–4	Sep 2008 – Dec 2008	Limited series	
Eric Red's Containment		#1–5	Jan 2005 – May 2005	Limited series	
Eternal Descent	vol. 1	#1–6	Mar 2010 – Jan 2011	Limited series; published under the Black Crown imprint.	
Eternal Descent	vol. 2	#1–6	Oct 2011 – Aug 2012	Limited series	
Euthanauts		#1–5	Jul 2018 – Nov 2018	Limited series; published under the Black Crown imprint.	
Eve Stranger		#1–5	Apr 2019 – Apr 2020	Limited series; published under the Black Crown imprint.	
Everybody's Dead		#1–5	Mar 2008 – Jul 2008	Limited series	
Event Horizon	Dark Descent	#1–5	August 20, 2025 – February 4, 2026		
Event Horizon	Inferno	#1–	April 2026 –		
EZ Street		nn	Apr 2010	Graphic novel	

== F ==
Title	Series	Issues	Dates	Notes	Reference
F.A.R.M. System		nn	Nov 2022	Graphic novel; published under the Top Shelf Productions imprint.	
Fallen Angel	vol. 1	#1–33	Dec 2005 – Dec 2008	Ongoing series	
Fallen Angel	Reborn	#1–4	Jul 2009 – Oct 2009	Limited series	
Fallen Angel	Return of the Son	#1–33	Jan 2011 – Apr 2011	Limited series	
Falling for Lionheart		nn	Oct 2010	Graphic novel	
Fear and Loathing in Las Vegas		#1–4	May 2016 – Aug 2016	Limited series; based on the 1971 novel of the same title by Hunter S. Thompson.	
Fever Ridge: A Tale of MacArthur's Jungle War		#1–4	Feb 2013 – Oct 2013	Limited series	
Finding Peace		nn	May 2008	Graphic novel	
A Fine and Private Place		#1	Sep 2012	Limited series; adaptation of 1960 novel. Only the first issue of this series was published in July 2014 that had five issues planned.	
First Strike		#0–6	Jun 2017 – Oct 2017	Limited series; sequel to Revolution.	
First Strike	G.I. Joe	#1	One-shot	Sep 2017	
First Strike	M.A.S.K.: Mobile Armored Strike Kommand	#1	One-shot	Oct 2017	
First Strike	Micronauts	#1	One-shot	Sep 2017	
First Strike	Optimus Prime	#1	One-shot	Sep 2017	
First Strike	Rom	#1	One-shot	Oct 2017	
First Strike	Transformers	#1	One-shot	Oct 2017	
Fistful of Blood		#1–4	Oct 2015 – Jan 2016	Limited series	
The Fly: Outbreak		#1–5	Mar 2015 – Jul 2015	Limited series; based on the film series, sequel to The Fly II (1989).	
Focus On	30 Days of Night	nn	Sep 2007		
Focus On	Star Trek	nn	Jul 2017		
Frankenstein: Alive, Alive!		#1–5	May 2012 – Jan 2018	Limited series	
From the Ashes		#1–6	May 2009 – Nov 2009	Limited series	
Funko Universe	Ghostbusters	nn	May 2017	One-shot	
Funko Universe	Judge Dredd	nn	Apr 2017	One-shot	
Funko Universe	Strawberry Shortcake	nn	May 2017	One-shot	
Funko Universe	Teenage Mutant Ninja Turtles	nn	May 2017	One-shot	
Funko Universe	The X-Files	nn	May 2017	One-shot	
FX		#1–6	Mar 2008 – Aug 2008	Limited series	

== G ==
Title	Series	Issues	Dates	Notes	Reference
G.I. Joe	vol. 1	#0–27	Oct 2008 – Feb 2011	Ongoing series	
G.I. Joe	vol. 2	#1–21	May 2011 – Jan 2013	Ongoing series	
G.I. Joe	vol. 3	#1–15	Feb 2013 – Apr 2014	Ongoing series	
G.I. Joe	vol. 4	#1–8	Sep 2014 – Apr 2015	Limited series	
G.I. Joe	vol. 5	#1–9	Dec 2016 – Oct 2017	Limited series	
G.I. Joe	vol. 6	#1–10	Sep 2019 – Nov 2020	Ongoing series	
G.I. Joe	Castle Fall	–	Nov 2020	One-shot	
G.I. Joe	Cobra Civil War	#0	Apr 2011	One-shot	
G.I. Joe	Cobra World Order Prelude	–	Oct 2015	One-shot	
G.I. Joe	Deviations	–	March 2016	One-shot	
G.I. Joe	First Strike	#1	Sep 2017	One-shot; First Strike tie-in	
G.I. Joe	Future Noir Special	#1–2	Nov 2010 – Dec 2010	Limited series	
G.I. Joe	Hearts & Minds	#1–5	May 2010 – Sep 2010	Limited series	
G.I. Joe	Infestation	#1–2	Mar 2011	Limited series; Infestation tie-in	
G.I. Joe	Infestation 2	#1–2	Mar 2012	Limited series; Infestation 2 tie-in	
G.I. Joe	Operation Hiss	#1–4	Feb – May 2010	Limited series; set in the film series continuity	
G.I. Joe	Origins	#1–23	Feb 2009 – Jan 2011	Limited series	
G.I. Joe	Retaliation – Official Movie Prequel	#1–4	Feb 2012 – Apr 2012	Limited series; movie tie-in	
G.I. Joe	Revolution	#1	Oct 2016	One-shot; Revolution tie-in	
G.I. Joe	Saturday Morning Adventures	#1–4	Feb 2022 – Jun 2022	Limited series	
G.I. Joe	Sierra Muerte	#1–3	Feb 2019 – Apr 2019	Limited series	
G.I. Joe	Special Missions	#1–14	Mar 2013 – Apr 2014	Limited series	
G.I. Joe	The Cobra Files	#1–9	Apr 2013 – Dec 2013	Limited series	
G.I. Joe	vs. The Six Million Dollar Man	#1–4	Feb 2018 – May 2018	Limited series; co-published with Dynamite Entertainment	
G.I. Joe: A Real American Hero		#156–300	Jul 2010 – Nov 2022	Ongoing series	
G.I. Joe: A Real American Hero	Annual	2012	Feb 2012	Annual	
G.I. Joe: A Real American Hero	FCDB	#155½	May 2010		
G.I. Joe: A Real American Hero	Silent Option	#1–4	Sep 2018 – Dec 2018	Limited series	
G.I. Joe: A Real American Hero	Yo, Joe!	–	Feb 2022	One-shot	
G.I. Joe: Cobra	vol. 1	#1–4	Mar – Jun 2009	Limited series	
G.I. Joe: Cobra	vol. 2	#1–13	Jan 2010 – Feb 2011	Ongoing series	
G.I. Joe: Cobra	vol. 3	#1–21	May 2011 – Jan 2013	Ongoing series	
G.I. Joe: Cobra	Cobraaaa!	–	Mar 2022	One-shot	
G.I. Joe: Snake Eyes	vol. 1	#1–4	Oct 2009 – Jan 2010	Limited series; The Rise of Cobra movie tie-in	
G.I. Joe: Snake Eyes	vol. 2	#1–12	May 2011 – Apr 2012	Limited series; Cobra Civil War tie-in	
G.I. Joe: Snake Eyes	Agent of Cobra	#1–5	Jan 2015 – May 2015	Limited series	
G.I. Joe: Snake Eyes	Deadgame	#1–5	Jul 2020 – Jul 2021	Limited series	
G.I. Joe Special	Helix	#1	Aug 2009	One-shot	
G.I. Joe Special	Cobra	#1	Sep 2009	One-shot	
G.I. Joe: The Rise of Cobra	Official Movie Adaptation	#1–4	Jun 2009	Limited series; movie adaptation	
G.I. Joe: The Rise of Cobra	Official Movie Prequel	#1–4	Mar – Jun 2009	Limited series; movie tie-in	
Galaxy Quest	Global Warning	#1–5	Aug 2008 – Dec 2008	Limited series; based on the DreamWorks Pictures film	
Galaxy Quest	The Journey Continues	#1–4	Jan 2015 – Apr 2015	Limited series; based on the DreamWorks Pictures film	
Garbage Pail Kids	Fables, Fantasy and Farts	–	Apr 2015	One-shot	
Garbage Pail Kids	Go Hollywood	–	Aug 2015	One-shot	
Garbage Pail Kids	Gross Encounters of the Turd Kind	–	Jun 2015	One-shot	
Garbage Pail Kids	Love Stinks	–	Feb 2015	One-shot	
Garbage Pail Kids	Puke-tacular	–	Dec 2014	One-shot	
Gateway		#1–4	Jan 2014 – Apr 2014	Limited series	
Gears of War	Hivebusters	#1–5	Mar 2019 – Jul 2019	Limited series	
Gears of War	The Rise of RAAM	#1–4	Jan 2018 – Apr 2018	Limited series	
Gears Pop!		–	Jul 2019	One-shot	
Gene Pool		–	Oct 2003	One-shot	
Gene Simmons'	Dominatrix	#1–6	Aug 2007 – Jan 2008	Limited series	
Gene Simmons'	House of Horrors	#1–3	Jul 2007 – Sep 2007	Limited series	
Gene Simmons'	Zipper	#1–6	Nov 2007 – Apr 2008	Limited series	
George A. Romero's	Dawn of the Dead	#1–3	Apr 2004 – Jun 2004	Limited series; movie adaptation	
George A. Romero's	Land of the Dead	#1–5	Aug 2005 – Dec 2005	Limited series; movie adaptation	
Ghost Tree		#1–4	Apr 2019 – Jul 2019	Limited series	
Ghost Whisperer	The Haunted	#1–5	Mar 2008 – Jul 2008	Limited series; based on TV series	
Ghost Whisperer	The Muse	#1–4	Dec 2008 – Mar 2009	Limited series; based on TV series	
Ghostbusters	vol. 1	#1–16	Sep 2011 – Dec 2012	Ongoing series	
Ghostbusters	vol. 2	#5–20	Jun 2013 – Sep 2014	Ongoing series	
Ghostbusters	Annual	2015	Nov 2015		
Ghostbusters	Annual	2017	Jan 2017		
Ghostbusters	Annual	2018	Feb 2018		
Ghostbusters	101	#1–6	Mar 2017 – Aug 2017	Limited series	
Ghostbusters	Answer the Call	#1–5	Oct 2017 – Feb 2018	Limited series; based on the 2016 reboot film	
Ghostbusters	Con-Volution	–	Jun 2010	One-shot	
Ghostbusters	Crossing Over	#1–8	Mar 2018 – Oct 2018	Limited series	
Ghostbusters	Day of the Dead	–	Oct 2017	Halloween ComicFest exclusive	
Ghostbusters	Deviations	–	Mar 2016	One-shot	
Ghostbusters	Displaced Aggression	#1–4	Sep 2009 – Dec 2009	Limited series	
Ghostbusters	Funko Universe	–	May 2017	One-shot	
Ghostbusters	Get Real	#1–8	Jun 2015 – Sep 2015	Limited series	
Ghostbusters	IDW 20/20	–	Jan 2019	One-shot	
Ghostbusters	Infestation	#1–2	Mar 2011	Limited series; Infestation tie-in	
Ghostbusters	International	#1–11	Jan 2016 – Nov 2016	Ongoing series	
Ghostbusters	Past, Present, and Future	#1	Dec 2009	One-shot	
Ghostbusters	Tainted Love	#1	Feb 2010	One-shot	
Ghostbusters	Times Scare!	–	Oct 2012	Halloween ComicFest exclusive	
Ghostbusters	The Other Side	#1–4	Oct 2008 – Jan 2009	Limited series	
Ghostbusters	What in Samhain Just Happened?!	–	Oct 2010	One-shot	
Ghostbusters	Year One	#1–4	Jan 2020 – Apr 2020	Limited series	
Ghostbusters 35th Anniversary	Ghostbusters	–	Apr 2019	One-shot	
Ghostbusters 35th Anniversary	The Real Ghostbusters	–	Apr 2019	One-shot	
Ghostbusters 35th Anniversary	Answer the Call	–	Apr 2019	One-shot	
Ghostbusters 35th Anniversary	Extreme Ghostbusters	–	Apr 2019	One-shot	
The Ghoul		#1–3	Nov 2009 – Mar 2010	Limited series	
Giantkillers	vol. 1	#0	Nov 2017	One-shot	
Giantkillers	vol. 2	–	Mar 2019	One-shot	
Glow		#1–4	May 2019 – Jun 2019	Limited series	
Glow	Summer Special	–	Jul 2019	One-shot	
Glow	vs. the Babyface	#1–4	Nov 2019 – Feb 2020	Limited series	
Go-Bots		#1–5	Nov 2018 – Mar 2019	Limited series	
Godzilla		#1–13	May 2012 – May 2013	Ongoing series	
Godzilla	70th Anniversary	–	May 2024	One-shot	
Godzilla	Cataclysm	#1–5	Aug 2014 – Dec 2014	Limited series	
Godzilla	Gangsters & Goliaths	#1–5	Jun 2011 – Oct 2011	Limited series	
Godzilla	in Hell	#1–5	Jul – Nov 2015	Limited series	
Godzilla	Kingdom of Monsters	#1–12	Mar 2011 – Feb 2012	Ongoing series; first title under IDW	
Godzilla	Legends	#1–5	Nov 2011 – Mar 2012	Limited series	
Godzilla	Mechagodzilla 50th Anniversary Special	–	May 2024	One-shot	
Godzilla	Oblivion	#1–5	Mar 2016 – Jul 2016	Limited series	
Godzilla	Rage Across Time	#1–5	Aug 2016 – Nov 2016	Limited series	
Godzilla	Rulers of Earth	#1–25	Jun 2013 – Jun 2015	Ongoing series	
Godzilla	Skate or Die!	#1–5	Jun 2024 – present	Limited series	
Godzilla	The Half-Century War	#1–5	Aug 2012 – Feb 2013	Limited series	
Godzilla	Valentine's Day Special	–	Feb 2024	One-shot	
Godzilla	War for Humanity	#1–5	Aug 2023 – May 2024	Limited series	
Godzilla: Here There Be Dragons		#1–5	Jun 2023 – Aug 2022	Limited series	
Godzilla: Here There Be Dragons	II: Sons of Giants	#1–5	Jun 2024 – present	Limited series	
Godzilla: Monsters & Protectors		#1–5	Apr 2021 – Aug 2021	Limited series	
Godzilla: Monsters & Protectors	All Hail the King!	#1–5	Oct 2022 – Feb 2023	Limited series	
Godzilla Rivals	Biollante vs. Destoroyah	–	2023	One-shot	
Godzilla Rivals	Jet Jaguar versus Megalon	–	Dec 2023	One-shot	
Godzilla Rivals	Mothra vs. Hedorah	–	Jun 2024	One-shot	
Godzilla Rivals	Mothra vs. M.O.G.U.E.R.A.	–	Feb 2024	One-shot	
Godzilla Rivals	Mothra vs. Titanosaurus	–	Mar 2023	One-shot	
Godzilla Rivals	Rodan vs. Ebirah	–	Jan 2023	One-shot	
Godzilla Rivals	vs. Battra	–	Aug 2022	One-shot	
Godzilla Rivals	vs. Gigan	–	Nov 2022	One-shot	
Godzilla Rivals	vs. Hedorah	–	Jun 2021	One-shot	
Godzilla Rivals	vs. King Ghidorah	–	Mar 2022	One-shot	
Godzilla Rivals	vs. Manda	–	Jul 2024	One-shot	
Godzilla Rivals	vs. Mechagodzilla	–	Nov 2023	One-shot	
Godzilla Rivals	vs. Mothra	–	Sep 2021	One-shot	
Godzilla Rivals	vs. Spacegodzilla	–	Aug 2023	One-shot	
Godzilla vs. Mighty Morphin Power Rangers		#1–5	Mar 2022 – Aug 2022	Limited series; co-published with Boom! Studios	
Godzilla vs. Mighty Morphin Power Rangers	II	#1–5	Apr 2024 – Aug 2024	Limited series; co-published with Boom! Studios	
Goosebumps	Download and Die!	#1–3	Feb 2018 – Apr 2018	Limited series	
Goosebumps	Horrors of the Witch House	#1–3	Mar 2019 – May 2019	Limited series	
Goosebumps	Monsters at Midnight	#1–3	Oct – Dec 2017	Limited series	
Goosebumps	Secrets of the Swamp	#1–5	Sep 2020 – Jan 2021	Limited series	
The Great and Secret Show		#1–12	Mar 2006 – May 2007	Limited series; adaptation of 1989 novel.	
Grimjack	Killer Instinct	#1–6	Jan 2005 – Jun 2005	Limited series	
Grimjack	The Manx Cat	#1–6	Aug 2009 – Jan 2010	Limited series	
Groom Lake		#1–4	Mar 2009 – Jul 2009	Limited series	
Grumpy Old Monsters		#1–4	Nov 2003 – Mar 2004	Limited series	
Gumballs		#1–4	2016 – 2017	Limited series	
Gutter Magic		#1–4	Jan 2016 – Apr 2016	Limited series	

== H ==
Title	Series	Issues	Dates	Notes	Reference
H.P. Lovecraft's The Dunwich Horror		#1–4	Oct 2011 – Jan 2012	Limited series; adapted from the 1928 short story by H.P. Lovecraft.	
Hairball: A Cal McDonald Mystery		nn	Sep 2002	One-shot	
Half Past Danger	vol. 1	#1–6	May 2013 – Oct 2013	Limited series	
Half Past Danger	2	#1–5	Sep 2017 – Jan 2018	Limited series; sequel story.	
Hammer of the Gods: Mortal Enemy		#1	Jul 2011	One-shot; Hundred Penny Press edition.	
Hanazuki		#1–3	Jun 2017 – Aug 2017	Limited series; based on the web TV series.	
Hap and Leonard: Savage Season		nn	Oct 2017	Graphic novel; adapted from the 1990 novel by Joe R. Lansdale.	
Hasbro	Heroes Sourcebook	#1–3	May 2017 – Jul 2017	Limited series	
Hasbro	Toy Box Quarterly	nn	Dec 2017	One-shot; quarterly publication.	
Haunted Horror		#1–35	Oct 2012 – Jun 2018	Ongoing series; published under the Yoe Comics imprint.	
Haunted Love		#1–3	Feb 2016 – Apr 2016	Limited series; published under the Yoe Comics imprint.	
Haven	After the Storm	nn	Sep 2013	Tie-in packaged with the home media release of the third season. The comic picks up immediately after the final scene of the season finale.	
Haven	In the Beginning	nn	Aug 2014	Tie-in packaged with the home media release of the fourth season.	
Hawken		#1–6	Nov 2011 – Sep 2012	Limited series	
Helena Crash		#1–4	Mar 2017 – Jun 2017	Limited series	
Hero Comics		nn	Aug 2009	Annual	
Hero Comics	2011	nn	Aug 2012	Annual	
Hero Comics	2012	nn	May 2012	Annual	
Hero Comics	2014	nn	Nov 2014	Annual	
Heroic: A Womanthology		nn	Mar 2012	Graphic novel	
Hey, Amateur!		nn	Dec 2020	Graphic novel; published under the Black Crown imprint	
The High Ways		#1–4	Dec 2012 – Apr 2013	Limited series	
The Highest House		#1–6	Feb 2018 – Jul 2018	Limited series	
Highlander: The American Dream		#1–4	Feb 2017 – Jun 2017	Limited series; based on the film series.	
The Hollows		#1–4	Dec 2012 – Mar 2013	Limited series	
Horrorcide		#1	Sep 2004	One-shot	
Hot Damn		#1–5	Apr 2016 – Aug 2016	Limited series	
House Amok		#1–5	Aug 2018 – Dec 2018	Limited series; published under the Black Crown imprint.	
Humpty Dumpty		nn	Oct 2011	Graphic novel	
Hyde		#1	Oct 2004		
Hyperactive		nn	Nov 2008	Graphic novel	

== I ==
Title	Series	Issues	Dates	Notes	Reference
I Can Sell You a Body		#1–4	Dec 2019 – Mar 2020	Limited series	
IDW 20/20	Ghostbusters	nn	Jan 2019	One-shot	
IDW 20/20	Jem and the Holograms	nn	Jan 2019	One-shot	
IDW 20/20	My Little Pony	nn	Jan 2019	One-shot	
IDW 20/20	Star Trek: The Next Generation	nn	Jan 2019	One-shot	
IDW 20/20	Teenage Mutant Ninja Turtles	nn	Jan 2019	One-shot	
IDW's Tales of Terror		nn	Oct 2004	Graphic novel	
Igor	Movie Adaptation	#1–4	Aug 2008 – Sep 2008	Limited series; movie adaptation.	
Igor	Movie Prequel	#1–4	May 2008 – Oct 2008	Limited series; movie tie-in.	
The Illegitimates		#1–6	Dec 2013 – May 2014	Limited series	
Impossible Incorporated		#1–5	Sep 2018 – Feb 2019	Limited series	
Indestructible		#1–10	Dec 2013 – Dec 2014	Limited series	
Indestructible	Stingray	#1	May 2015	One-shot	
Infected		#1	Jul 2012	Limited series; adapted from the 2008 novel of the same title by Scott Sigler. Only the first issue of this series was published that had three issues planned.	
Infestation		#1–2	Jan 2011 – Apr 2011	Limited series	
Infestation	G.I. Joe	#1–2	Mar 2011	Limited series	
Infestation	Ghostbusters	#1–2	Mar 2011	Limited series	
Infestation	Outbreak	#1–4	Jun 2011 – Sep 2011	Limited series	
Infestation	Star Trek	#1–2	Feb 2011	Limited series	
Infestation	The Transformers	#1–2	Feb 2011	Limited series	
Infestation 2		#1–2	Jan 2012 – Apr 2012	Limited series	
Infestation 2	30 Days of Night	nn	Apr 2012	One-shot	
Infestation 2	Dungeons & Dragons	#1–2	Feb 2012	Limited series	
Infestation 2	G.I. Joe	#1–2	Mar 2012	Limited series	
Infestation 2	Team-Up	#1	Feb 2012	One-shot; published as a leap year special.	
Infestation 2	Teenage Mutant Ninja Turtles	#1–2	Mar 2012	Limited series	
Infestation 2	The Transformers	#1–2	Feb 2012	Limited series	
The Infinite Loop		#1–6	Apr 2015 – Sep 2015	Limited series	
The Infinite Loop	Nothing But the Truth	#1–4	Sep 2017 – Dec 2017	Limited series	
Insufferable		#1–8	May 2015 – Dec 2015	Limited series	
Insufferable	Home Field Advantage	#1–4	Oct 2016 – Jan 2017	Limited series	
Insufferable	On the Road	#1–6	Feb 2016 – Jul 2016	Limited series	
Iron Siege		#1–3	Dec 2010 – Apr 2011	Limited series	
Iron Sky		nn	May 2013	Graphic novel; movie adaptation	
The Island of Dr. Moreau		#1–2	Jul 2019 – Aug 2019	Limited series; adapted from the 1896 novel by H.G. Wells.	
It! The Terror from Beyond Space		#1–3	Jun 2010 – Sep 2010	Limited series; adaptation of the United Artists film; published under the Midnite Movies imprint.	

== J ==
Title	Series	Issues	Dates	Notes	Reference
Jack Avarice is The Courier		#1–5	Nov 2011	Limited series	
Jackboot & Ironheel		#1–4	Jun 2016 – Nov 2016	Limited series	
Jem and the Holograms		#1–26	Mar 2015 – Apr 2017	Ongoing series; based on the animated TV series.	
Jem and the Holograms	Dimensions	#1–4	Nov 2017 – Feb 2018	Limited series	
Jem and the Holograms	Holiday Special	nn	Dec 2015		
Jem and the Holograms	IDW 20/20	nn	Jan 2019	One-shot	
Jem and the Holograms	Infinite	#1–3	Jun 2017 – Aug 2017	Limited series	
Jem and the Holograms	Outrageous Annual	nn	Sep 2015	Annual	
Jem and the Holograms	Outrageous Annual 2017	nn	Jan 2017	Annual	
Jem and the Holograms	Valentine Special	nn	Feb 2016		
Jem and the Misfits		#1–5	Dec 2016 – Apr 2017	Limited series	
Jem and the Misfits	Infinite	#1–3	Jun 2017 – Aug 2017	Limited series	
Jericho	Redux	nn	Feb 2011	One-shot; based on TV series.	
Jericho	Season 3: Civil War	#1–6	Oct 2009 – May 2011	Limited series; based on TV series. Issue #1 was published by Devil's Due Publishing. The series was later picked up by IDW.	
Jericho	Season 4	#1–5	Jul 2012 – Jan 2014	Limited series; based on TV series.	
Jingle Belle: The Homemades' Tale		nn	Nov 2018	One-shot	
Jinnrise		#1–10	Jan 2013 – Feb 2014	Limited series	
Joe Frankenstein		#1–4	Feb 2015 – May 2015	Limited series	
Joe Palooka		#1–6	Dec 2012 – May 2013	Limited series	
Jon Sable Freelance	Ashes of Eden	#1–5	Oct 2009 – Feb 2010	Limited series	
Jon Sable Freelance	Bloodtrail	#1–6	Apr 2005 – Nov 2005	Limited series	
Judge Dredd	vol. 1	#1–30	Nov 2012 – May 2015	Ongoing series	
Judge Dredd	100-Page Giant	nn	Feb 2020	One-shot	
Judge Dredd	Anderson, Psi-Division	#1–4	Aug 2014 – Dec 2014	Limited series	
Judge Dredd	Annual	#1	Feb 2017	Annual	
Judge Dredd	Cry of the Werewolf	nn	Mar 2017	One-shot	
Judge Dredd	Deviations	nn	Mar 2017	One-shot	
Judge Dredd	False Witness	#1–4	Mar 2020 – Jan 2021	Limited series	
Judge Dredd	Funko Universe	nn	Apr 2017	One-shot	
Judge Dredd	Mega-City Two: City of Courts	#1–5	Jan 2014 – May 2014	Limited series	
Judge Dredd	Mega-City Zero	#1–12	Dec 2015 – Nov 2016	Limited series	
Judge Dredd	The Blessed Earth	#1–9	Apr 2017 – Nov 2017	Limited series	
Judge Dredd	Toxic	#1–4	Oct 2018 – Jan 2019	Limited series	
Judge Dredd	Under Siege	#1–4	May 2018 – Aug 2018	Limited series	
Judge Dredd	Year One	#1–4	Mar 2013 – Jul 2013	Limited series	
Jurassic Park	Dangerous Games	#1–5	Sep 2011 – Jan 2012	Limited series	
Jurassic Park	Redemption	#1–5	Jun – Oct 2010	Limited series	
Jurassic Park	The Devils in the Desert	#1–4	Jan – Apr 2011	Limited series	

== K ==
Title	Series	Issues	Dates	Notes	Reference
Karney		#1–4	Apr 2005 – Jul 2005	Limited series	
The Keep		#1–5	Sep 2005 – Mar 2006	Limited series	
Kid Lobotomy		#1–6	Oct 2017 – Mar 2018	Limited series	
The Kill Lock		#1–6	Dec 2019 – May 2020	Limited series	
The Kill Lock	The Artisan Wraith	#1–6	Mar 2022 – Aug 2022	Limited series	
Kill Shakespeare		#1–12	Apr 2010 – May 2011	Ongoing series	
Kill Shakespeare	Past is Prologue: Juliet	#1–4	Jun 2017 – Sep 2017	Limited series	
Kill Shakespeare	The Mask of Night	#1–4	Jun 2014 – Sep 2014	Limited series	
Kill Shakespeare	The Tide of Blood	#1–4	Feb 2013 – Jun 2013	Limited series	
The Killer Inside Me		#1–4	Aug 2016 – Dec 2016	Limited series, adapted from the 1952 Jim Thompson novel.	
Killing the Cobra: Chinatown Trollop		#1–4	May 2010 – Aug 2010	Limited series; adapted from the novel by Mario Acevedo.	
Killogy		#1–4	Oct 2012 – Apr 2013	Limited series	
KIϟϟ	vol. 1	#1–8	Jun 2012 – Jan 2013	Limited series	
KIϟϟ	Kids	#1–4	Aug 2013 – Nov 2013	Limited series	
KIϟϟ	Solo	#1–4	Mar 2013 – Jun 2013	Limited series	
Kitchen Table Magazine		#1	Jul 2019		
Kodiak		nn	Sep 2010	One-shot	
Kodiak	Halloween Special	nn	Oct 2014	One-shot	
Korgi: Short Tails		#1	Jul 2017		
Kull Eternal		#1–3	Jun 2017 – Apr 2018	Limited series	
Kull Eternal	Annual	2018	May 2018	Annual	

== L ==
Title	Series	Issues	Dates	Notes	Reference
The Last Fall		#1–5	Jul 2014 – Nov 2015	Limited series	
The Last Resort		#1–5	Jul 2009 – Dec 2009	Limited series	
The Last Unicorn		#1–6	Apr 2010 – Nov 2010	Limited series; adaptation of 1967 novel.	
The League of Extraordinary Gentlemen, Volume IV: The Tempest		#1–6	Jun 2018 – Jun 2019	Limited series; published under the Top Shelf Productions imprint	
Legion		nn	Nov 2007		
Legion: Prophets		#1–4	Nov 2009 – Dec 2009	Limited series	
Let's Play God...		#1	Oct 2012		
The Life and Times of Savior 28		#1–5	Mar 2009 – Aug 2009	Limited series	
The Life Eaters		nn	Jan 2015	Graphic novel	
Lifelike		nn	Dec 2007	Graphic novel	
Limbo Lounge		nn	Jan 2013	Graphic novel; published under the Yoe Books and Top Shelf imprints	
Little Book of Horror	Dracula	nn	Oct 2005	Graphic novel	
Little Book of Horror	Frankenstein	nn	Mar 2005	Graphic novel	
Little Book of Horror	War of the Worlds	nn	Jun 2005	Graphic novel	
Little Nemo: Return to Slumberland		#1–4	Sep 2014 – Feb 2015	Limited series	
Littlest Pet Shop		#1–5	May 2014 – Sep 2014	Limited series	
Littlest Pet Shop	Spring Cleaning	nn	Apr 2015	One-shot	
Locke & Key	Alpha	#1–2	Aug 2013 – Oct 2013	Limited series	
Locke & Key	Clockworks	#1-6	Jun 2011 – Apr 2012		
Locke & Key	Crown of Shadows	#1-6	Nov 2009 – Apr 2010		
Locke & Key	Dog Days	nn	Oct 2019	One-shot	
Locke & Key	FCDB	nn	May 2011		
Locke & Key	Grindhouse	nn	Aug 2012	One-shot	
Locke & Key	Guide to the Known Keys	nn	Oct 2011	One-shot	
Locke & Key	Head Games	#1–6	Jan – Jun 2009		
Locke & Key	Hell & Gone	#0–2	Oct 2020 – Nov 2021	Limited series; co-published with DC Comics	
Locke & Key	...In Pale Battalions Go...	#1–3	Aug 2020 – Oct 2020	Limited series	
Locke & Key	Keys to the Kingdom	#1-6	Aug 2010 – Mar 2011		
Locke & Key	Omega	#1–5	Nov 2012 – May 2013	Limited series	
Locke & Key	Small World	#1	Dec 2016		
Locke & Key	Welcome to Lovecraft	#1–6	Feb 2008 – Jul 2008		
Lodger		#1–5	Oct 2018 – Feb 2019	Limited series; published under the Black Crown imprint	
Long Distance		#1–4	Jun 2015 – Sep 2015	Limited series	
Lore		#1–5	Dec 2003 – Dec 2004	Limited series	
Love and Capes	Ever After	#1–5	Feb 2011 – Jun 2011	Limited series	
Love and Capes	What to Expect	#1–6	Aug 2012 – Jan 2013	Limited series	
Love Is Love		nn	Nov 2016		
Lowlifes		#1–4	Jun 2018 – Sep 2018	Limited series	
Luna the Vampire		#1–3	Jan 2016 – Mar 2016	Limited series	
Lurid		#1–3	Aug 2002 – May 2003	Limited series	
The Lurkers		#1–4	Oct 2004 – Jan 2005	Limited series	

== M ==
Title	Series	Issues	Dates	Notes	Reference
M.A.S.K.: Mobile Armored Strike Kommand		#1–10	Nov 2016 – Aug 2017	Ongoing series	
M.A.S.K.: Mobile Armored Strike Kommand		Annual 2017	Feb 2017	Ongoing series	
M.A.S.K.: Mobile Armored Strike Kommand	First Strike	nn	Oct 2017	First Strike tie-in.	
M.A.S.K.: Mobile Armored Strike Kommand	Revolution	nn	Sep 2016	Revolution tie-in.	
Machete		#0	Sep 2010	One-shot; based on the Robert Rodriguez film.	
Mage Knight	Rebellion	nn	2000	Ashcan comic	
Mage Knight	Stolen Destiny	#1–5	Oct 2002 – Feb 2003	Limited series	
The Maxx: Maxximized		#1–35	Nov 2013 – Sep 2016		
Magic: The Gathering		#1–4	Feb 2012 – May 2012	Limited series; based on the collectable card game from Wizards of the Coast.	
Magic: The Gathering	Chandra	#1–4	Nov 2018 – Feb 2019	Limited series	
Magic: The Gathering	Path of Vengeance	#1–4	Oct 2012 – Apr 2013	Limited series	
Magic: The Gathering	The Spell Thief	#1–4	Jun 2012 – Nov 2012	Limited series	
Magic: The Gathering	Theros	#1–5	Oct 2013 – Mar 2014	Limited series	
Mars Attacks		#1–10	Jun 2012 – May 2013	Limited series; previous was published by Topps Comics; later was by Dynamite Entertainment.	
Mars Attacks	Classics Obliterated	#1	Jun 2013	One-shot	
Mars Attacks	First Born	#1–4	May 2014 – Aug 2014	Limited series	
Mars Attacks	Judge Dredd	#1–4	Sep 2013 – Dec 2013	Limited series	
Mars Attacks	Kiss	nn	Jan 2013	One-shot	
Mars Attacks	Occupation	#1–5	Mar 2016 – Jul 2016	Limited series	
Mars Attacks	Popeye	nn	Jan 2013	One-shot	
Mars Attacks	The Holidays	nn	Oct 2012	One-shot	
Mars Attacks	The Real Ghostbusters	nn	Jan 2013	One-shot	
Mars Attacks	The Transformers	nn	Jan 2013	One-shot	
Mars Attacks	Zombies vs. Robots	nn	Jan 2013	One-shot	
Marvel Action	Black Panther	#1–5	Jan 2019 – Jun 2019	Limited series	
Marvel Action	Chillers	#1–4	Oct 2020 – Dec 2020	Limited series	
Marvel Action	Origins	#1–4	Dec 2021 – Oct 2021	Limited series	
Marvel Action: Avengers	vol. 1	#1–12	Dec 2018 – Dec 2020	Limited series	
Marvel Action: Avengers	vol. 2	#1–3	Feb 2020 – Nov 2020	Limited series	
Marvel Action: Captain Marvel	vol. 1	#1–6	Aug 2019 – Jul 2020	Limited series	
Marvel Action: Captain Marvel	vol. 2	#1–5	Jan 2021 – May 2021	Limited series	
Marvel Action: Spider-Man	vol. 1	#1–12	Nov 2018 – Nov 2019	Ongoing series	
Marvel Action: Spider-Man	vol. 2	#1–3	Jan 2020 – Jul 2020	Limited series	
Marvel Action: Spider-Man	vol. 3	#1–5	Mar 2021 – Aug 2021	Limited series	
Marvel Action Classics	Ant-Man	#1	Nov 2019	One-shot	
Marvel Action Classics	Captain America	#1	Jun 2019	One-shot	
Marvel Action Classics	Hulk	#1	Jul 2019	One-shot	
Marvel Action Classics	Spider-Man Two-In-One	#1–4	May 2019 – Oct 2021	Limited series	
Marvel Action Classics: Avengers	Starring Doctor Strange	#1	Jan 2020	One-shot	
Marvel Action Classics: Avengers	Starring Iron Man	#1	Apr 2020	One-shot	
Masters of Horror		#1–4	Dec 2005 – Mar 2006	Limited series; based on the TV series.	
The Maze Agency		#1–4	Nov 2005 – Jan 2006	Limited series	
Memorial		#1–6	Dec 2011 – May 2012	Limited series	
Memorial	Imaginary Fiends	#1–3	Mar 2013 – May 2013	Limited series	
The Memory Collectors		#1–3	Oct 2013 – Feb 2014	Limited series	
Metal Gear	Solid	#1–12	Sep 2004 – Aug 2005	Limited series	
Metal Gear	Solid 2: Sons of Liberty	#0–12	Sep 2005 – Sep 2007	Limited series	
Miami Vice Remix		#1–5	Mar 2015 – Jul 2015	Limited series; based on the TV series and co-published with Lion Forge Comics.	
Michael Recycle		#1–4	Mar 2017 – May 2017	Limited series	
Mickey and Donald Christmas Parade	2015	nn	Dec 2015	One-shot	
Mickey and Donald Christmas Parade	2016	nn	Dec 2016	One-shot	
Mickey and Donald Christmas Parade	2017	nn	Dec 2017	One-shot	
Mickey and Donald Christmas Parade	2018	nn	Nov 2018	One-shot	
Mickey and Donald Christmas Parade	2019	nn	Nov 2019	One-shot	
Mickey Mouse		#1–21 (#310–330)	Jun 2015 – Jun 2017	Ongoing series; previously published by Dell, Gold Key, Disney, Gladstone, Gemstone and Boom! Studios and resumed from #309.	
Mickey Mouse Shorts: Season One		#1–4	Jul 2016 – Oct 2016	Limited series; TV series adaptation.	
Mickey's Craziest Adventures		nn	Sep 2016	Graphic novel	
Micronauts		#1–11	Apr 2016 – Mar 2017	Ongoing series	
Micronauts		Annual	Jan 2017	Ongoing series	
Micronauts	First Strike	nn	Sep 2017	One-shot; First Strike tie-in.	
Micronauts	Revolution	nn	Sep 2016	One-shot; Revolution tie-in.	
Micronauts	Wrath of Karza	#1–5	Apr 2017 – Aug 2017	Limited series	
The Mighty Elvis – A Graphic Biography		nn	Jan 2020	Graphic novel	
Mighty Morphin Power Rangers/Teenage Mutant Ninja Turtles	vol. 1	#1–5	Dec 2019 – Jun 2020	Limited series; co-published with Boom! Studios and Nickelodeon.	
Mighty Morphin Power Rangers/Teenage Mutant Ninja Turtles	II	#1–5	Dec 2022 – Apr 2023	Limited series; co-published with Boom! Studios and Nickelodeon.	
Millennium		#1–5	Jan 2015 – May 2015	Limited series; based on TV series; spun off from issue #18 of The X-Files: Season 10.	
Milt Gross' New York		nn	Apr 2015	Graphic novel	
Monocyte		#1–4	Oct 2011 – May 2012	Limited series	
Monster & Madman		#1–3	Mar 2014 – May 2014	Limited series	
Monster House		nn	Jun 2006	Graphic novel; based on the Sony Pictures/ImageMovers film.	
Monster Motors		nn	Jul 2014	One-shot	
Monster Motors	The Curse of Minivan Helsing	#1–2	Feb 2015 – Mar 2015	Limited series; sequel to the original standalone comic.	
Motel Hell		#1–3	Oct 2010 – Dec 2010	Limited series; adaptation of the United Artists film; published under the Midnite Movies imprint.	
Mountainhead		#1–5	Aug 2019 – Nov 2020	Limited series	
Mr. Peabody & Sherman		#1–5	Nov 2013 – Jan 2014	Limited series; based on the DreamWorks Animation film.	
The Mummy: The Rise and Fall of Xango's Ax		#1–4	Apr 2008 – Jul 2008	Limited series; based on film series, set in the 1999 film continuity.	
The Murder of King Tut		#1–5	Jun 2010 – Oct 2010	Limited series; adaptation of the 2009 book by James Patterson and Martin Dugard.	
My Little Pony
My Little Pony		#1 – present	May 2022 – present	Ongoing series; based on, and featuring elements from, the film A New Generation.	
My Little Pony	Feats of Friendship	#1–3	Aug 2019 – Oct 2019	Limited series	
My Little Pony	Fiendship Is Magic	#1–5	Apr 2015	Limited series	
My Little Pony	Friends Forever	#1–38	Jan 2014 – Mar 2017	Ongoing series	
My Little Pony	Friendship Is Magic	#1–102	Nov 2012 – Sep 2021	Ongoing series; based on the TV series.	
My Little Pony	Friendship Is Magic	Annual	Mar 2021		
My Little Pony	Generations	#1–4	Oct 2021 – Feb 2022	Limited series	
My Little Pony	Guardians of Harmony Annual 2017	nn	Feb 2017	Annual	
My Little Pony	Holiday Special	nn	Dec 2015		
My Little Pony	Holiday Special	nn	Dec 2017		
My Little Pony	Holiday Special	nn	Dec 2019		
My Little Pony	IDW 20/20	nn	Jan 2019	One-shot	
My Little Pony	Legends of Magic	#1–12	Apr 2017 – Mar 2018	Limited series	
My Little Pony	Legends of Magic	Annual	Apr 2018	Limited series	
My Little Pony	Micro-Series	#1–10	Feb 2013 – Dec 2013	Limited series	
My Little Pony	Nightmare Knights	#1–5	Oct 2018 – Feb 2019	Limited series	
My Little Pony	Ponyville Mysteries	#1–5	May 2018 – Sep 2018	Limited series	
My Little Pony	Spirit of the Forest	#1–3	May 2019 – Jul 2019	Limited series	
My Little Pony	The Movie Adaptation	nn	Sep 2017	Graphic novel; movie adaptation.	
My Little Pony	The Movie Prequel	#1–4	Jun 2017 – Sep 2017	Limited series; movie tie-in.	
My Little Pony: Classics Reimagined	Little Fillies	#1–4	Nov 2022 – Feb 2023	Limited series	
My Little Pony: Equestria Girls	Annual	2013	Oct 2013		
My Little Pony: Equestria Girls	Annual	2014	Sep 2013		
My Little Pony: Equestria Girls	Canterlot High: March Radness	nn	Mar 2020		
My Little Pony: Equestria Girls	Holiday Special	nn	Dec 2014		
The Mueller Report		nn	Sep 2020	Graphic novel	
Murden's Bar		nn	Dec 2007	Graphic novel	
Music Box		#1–5	Nov 2009 – Apr 2010	Limited series	
My Grandparents Are Secret Agents		nn	Jan 2009	Graphic novel	
Mystery Society		#1–5	May 2010 – Oct 2010	Limited series	

== N ==
Title	Series	Issues	Dates	Notes	Reference
Nanovor: Game Day		#1–3	Aug 2009 – Oct 2009	Limited series; based on the web video game	
Napoleon Dynamite		#1–4	Sep 2009 – Dec 2009	Limited series; based on the 20th Century Fox film	
Napoleon Dynamite		Valentine's Day Special	Feb 2020	Limited series; based on the 20th Century Fox film	
Narcos		#1–3	Dec 2019 – Feb 2010	Limited series; based on web TV series	
New Avengers/Transformers		#1–4	Jul 2007 – Oct 2007	Limited series; co-published with Marvel Comics	
The New Ghostbusters		#1–4	Feb 2013 – May 2013	Title continued as Ghostbusters from #5.	
Next Men		#1–9	Dec 2010 – Aug 2011	Limited series	
Next Men	Aftermath	#40–44	Feb 2012 – Jun 2012	Limited series	
Night Mary		#1–5	Jul 2005 – Nov 2005	Limited series	
Night Moves		#1–5	Nov 2018 – Mar 2019	Limited series	
Night of 1,000 Wolves		#1–3	May 2012 – Jul 2012	Limited series	
Night Owl Society		#1–3	Apr – Jun 2017	Limited series	

== O ==
Title	Series	Issues	Dates	Notes	Reference
The October Faction		#1–18	Oct 2014 – Jul 2016	Ongoing series	
The October Faction	Deadly Season	#1–5	Oct 2016 – Feb 2017	Limited series	
The October Faction	Special Edition	#1	Sep 2019		
The October Faction	Supernatural Dreams	#1–4	Mar 2018 – Jul 2018	Limited series	
Off Road		nn	Jan 2011	Graphic novel	
Olympus Heights		#1–5	Jul 2004 – Nov 2004	Limited series	
Onyx		#1–4	Jul 2015 – Oct 2015	Limited series	
Optimus Prime		#1–25	Dec 2016 – Oct 2018	Ongoing series	
Optimus Prime	Annual	2018	Feb 2018		
Optimus Prime	First Strike	#1	Sep 2017	One-shot; First Strike tie-in	
The Original Johnson	Book 1	nn	Dec 2009	Graphic novels	
The Original Johnson	Book 2	nn	Jan 2011	Graphic novels	
Orphan Black	vol. 1	#1–5	Feb 2015 – Jun 2015	Limited series; based on TV series	
Orphan Black	Crazy Science	#1	Jun 2018	One-shot	
Orphan Black	Deviations	#1–6	Mar 2017 – Aug 2017	Limited series	
Orphan Black	Helsinki	#1–5	Nov 2015 – Mar 2016	Limited series	
The Other Dead		#1–6	Sep 2013 – Feb 2014	Limited series	

== P ==
Title	Series	Issues	Dates	Notes	Reference
Pandemica		#1–5	Sep 2019 – Jan 2020	Limited series	
Pantheon		#1–4	Apr 2010 – Aug 2010	Limited series	
Pet Robots		nn	Nov 2008	Graphic novel; co-published with Blue Dream Studios under the Worthwhile Books imprint.	
Phantasmagoria: The Ghost Lens		#1–5	May 2015 – Sep 2015	Limited series	
Phoenix Without Ashes		#1–4	Aug 2010 – Nov 2010	Limited series	
The Pilgrim		#1–2	Apr 2010 – Jun 2010	Limited series	
Pinocchio: Vampire Slayer Versus the Vampire Zoo		nn	Dec 2015	Graphic novel; published under the Top Shelf Productions imprint.	
Pirat Tales: Legend of the Cat O' Nine Tails		#1–2	Nov 2008 – Dec 2008	Limited series	
The Plane Story		nn	Feb 2011	Graphic novel	
Popbot		#1–8	Jan 2002 – Feb 2009	Limited series	
Popbot Reader: Volume One		nn	Mar 2005		
Popeye		#1–12	Apr 2012 – Apr 2013	Ongoing series	
The Pound: Ghouls Night Out		#1–4	Sep 2012 – Dec 2012	Limited series; Proof makes a guest appearance in the first issue of this series.	
The Powerpuff Girls	vol. 1	#1–12	Sep 2013 – Jun 2014	Ongoing series; based on the original 1998 series.	
The Powerpuff Girls	vol. 2	#1–6	Jul 2016 – Dec 2016	Limited series; based on the 2016 reboot of the series.	
The Powerpuff Girls	Super Smash-Up!	#1–6	Jan 2015 – May 2015	Limited series; sequel to Super Secret Crisis War!.	
The Powerpuff Girls	The Bureau of Bad	#1–3	Nov 2017 – Jan 2018	Limited series, based on the 2016 reboot of the series.	
The Powerpuff Girls	The Time Tie	#1–3	May 2017 – Jul 2017	Limited series, based on the 2016 reboot of the series.	
Predator vs. Judge Dredd vs. Aliens: Splice and Dice		#1–4	Jul 2016 – Jun 2017	Limited series; co-published with Dark Horse Comics.	
Presidential Material	Barack Obama	nn	Oct 2008	One-shot	
Presidential Material	John McCain	nn	Oct 2008	One-shot	
Punks Not Dead		#1–6	Feb 2018 – Jul 2018	Limited series; published under the Black Crown imprint.	
Punks Not Dead	London Calling	#1–5	Feb 2019 – Jun 2019	Limited series; published under the Black Crown imprint.	

== Q ==
Title	Series	Issues	Dates	Type	Notes	Reference(s)
A Quiet Place	Storm Warning	#1–	March 11, 2026 –			

== R ==
Title	Series	Issues	Dates	Type	Notes
Radical: My Year with a Socialist Senator		nn	Jun 2022	Graphic novel	
Radio Delley		nn	Mar 2019	Graphic novel	
Ragnarok		#1–12	Jul 2014 – Feb 2017	Limited series	
Ragnarok	The Breaking of Helheim	#1–6	Jul 2019 – Jul 2020	Limited series	
Rampage Jackson: Street Soldier		nn	Oct 2015	Graphic novel	
Read Only Memories		#1–4	Dec 2019 – Mar 2020	Limited series	
Real Science Adventures		#1–6	Apr 2017 – Sep 2017	Limited series	
Rebel		nn	Sep 2009	Graphic novel	
Red Light Properties		nn	Jan 2014	Graphic novel	
Red Range: A Wild Western Adventure		nn	Jun 2017	Graphic novel	
Relic of the Dragon		nn	Feb 2018	Graphic novel	
Remains		#1–5	May 2004 – Sep 2004	Limited series	
The Resistance		nn	Apr 2009	Graphic novel	
Revolution		#0–5	Sep 2016 – Nov 2016	Limited series	
Revolution	Action Man	nn	Oct 2016	One-shot	
Revolution	Aw Yeah	#1–3	Feb 2017 –Jul 2017	Limited series	
Revolution	G.I. Joe	#1	Oct 2016	One-shot	
Revolution	M.A.S.K.: Mobile Armored Strike Kommand	#1	Sep 2016	One-shot	
Revolution	Micronauts	#1	Oct 2016	One-shot	
Revolution	Prelude	#00	Jul 2016	One-shot	
Revolution	Rom	nn	Sep 2016	One-shot	
Revolution	Transformers	nn	Sep 2016	One-shot	
Revolution	Transformers: More Than Meets the Eye	nn	Nov 2016	One-shot	
Revolution	Transformers: Till All Are One	#1	Oct 2016	One-shot	
Revolutionaries		#1–8	Dec 2016 – Jul 2017	Limited series	
Richard Matheson's	Hell House	#1–4	Dec 2004 – Jun 2005	Limited series; adaptation of 1971 novel	
Richard Matheson's	The Shrinking Man	#1–4	Jul 2015 – Oct 2015	Limited series; adaptation 1956 novel	
Rick and Morty vs. Dungeons & Dragons	vol. 1	#1–4	Aug 2018 – Dec 2018	Limited series; co-published with Oni Press.	
Rick and Morty vs. Dungeons & Dragons	Chapter II: Painscape	#1–4	Aug 2019 – Dec 2019	Limited series; co-published with Oni Press.	
Rick and Morty vs. Dungeons & Dragons	The Meeseeks Adventure	nn	Feb 2022	One-shot; co-published with Oni Press.	
Rip Haywire and the Curse of Tangaroa!		nn	Oct 2011	Graphic novel	
Rise of the Teenage Mutant Ninja Turtles		#0–5	Jul 2018 – Jan 2019	Limited series; based on TV series	
Rise of the Teenage Mutant Ninja Turtles	Sound Off!	#1–3	Jul 2018 – Sep 2009	Limited series; based on TV series	
Rising Sun		#1–3	Nov 2019 – Jan 2020	Limited series	
Road of Bones		#1–4	May 2019 – Aug 2019	Limited series	
Road of the Dead: Highway to Hell		#1–3	Oct 2018 – Dec 2018	Limited series	
Road Rage		#1–4	Feb 2012 – May 2012	Limited series	
Road to Hell		#1–3	Jul 2006 – Nov 2006	Limited series	
The Rocketeer
The Rocketeer	at War	#1–4	Dec 2015 – Apr 2016	Limited series	
The Rocketeer	Cargo of Doom	#1–4	Aug 2012 – Nov 2012	Limited series	
The Rocketeer	Hollywood Horror	#1–4	Feb 2013 – May 2013	Limited series	
The Rocketeer	The Great Race	#1–4	Apr 2022 – Jul 2022	Limited series	
The Rocketeer	& The Spirit: Pulp Friction	#1–4	Jul 2013 – Dec 2013	Limited series; co-published with DC Comics	
Rocketeer Adventures	vol. 1	#1–4	May 2011 – Aug 2011	Limited series	
Rocketeer Adventures	2	#1–4	Mar 2012 – Jun 2012	Limited series	
Rocky & Bullwinkle		#1–4	Mar 2014 – Jun 2014	Limited series; based on TV series	
Rogue Angel: Teller of Tall Tales		#1–5	Feb 2008 – Jun 2008	Limited series	
Rogue One: A Star Wars Story – Graphic Novel Adaptation		nn	Dec 2017	Graphic novel; movie adaptation	
Rogue Trooper		#1–4	Feb 2014 – May 2014	Limited series	
Rom		#1–14	Jul 2016 – Aug 2017	Ongoing series	
Rom	Annual	2017	Jan 2017		
Rom	FCDB	2016	Jun 2016	Free Comic Book Day exclusive	
Rom	Dire Wraiths	#1–3	Oct 2019 – Oct 2020	Limited series	
Rom	First Strike	#1	Oct 2017	One-shot; First Strike tie-in	
Rom	Revolution	#1	Sep 2016	One-shot; Revolution tie-in	
Rom	vs. Transformers: Shining Armor	#1–5	Jul 2017 – Nov 2017	Limited series	
Rom/Micronauts		#1–5	Dec 2017 – Apr 2018	Limited series	
Rot & Ruin		#1–5	Oct 2014 – Jan 2015	Limited series	

== S ==
Title	Series	Issues	Dates	Notes	Reference
Samurai Jack	vol. 1	#1–20	Oct 2013 – May 2015	Ongoing series	
Samurai Jack	Lost Worlds	#1–4	Apr 2019 – Jul 2019	Limited series	
Samurai Jack	Quantum Jack	#1–5	Sep 2017 – Jan 2018	Limited series	
Satellite Falling		#1–5	May 2016 – May 2017	Limited series	
Saturday Morning Adventures	Dungeons & Dragons	#1–4	Mar 2023 – Jun 2023	Limited series	
Saturday Morning Adventures	G.I. Joe	#1–4	Feb 2022 – Jun 2022	Limited series	
Saturday Morning Adventures	Teenage Mutant Ninja Turtles	#1–4	Oct 2022 – Jan 2023	Limited series	
Saucer State		#1–6	May 2017 – Oct 2017	Limited series	
Saw: Rebirth		nn	Oct 2005	One-shot; based on film series	
Scarenthood		#1–4	Oct 2020 – Jan 2021	Limited series	
Scarface	Devil in Disguise	#1–5	Jul 2007 – Oct 2007	Limited series; based on t 1983 film	
Scarface	Scarred for Life	#1–5	Dec 2006 – Apr 2007	Limited series; based on 1983 film	
Scarlett's Strike Force		#1–3	Dec 2017 – Feb 2018	Limited series	
Schick Hydrobot and the Transformers: A New Friend		nn	May 2017	One-shot; promotional tie-in	
Sea of Sorrows		#1–4	Nov 2020 – Mar 2021	Limited series	
Secret Battles of Genghis Khan		nn	Jan 2013	Graphic novel	
Secret Skull		#1–4	Aug 2004 – Nov 2004	Limited series	
Anne Rice's Servant of the Bones		#1–6	Aug 2011 – Jan 2012	Limited series; adaptation of 1996 novel	
The Seven-Per-Cent Solution		#1–5	Aug 2015 – Dec 2015	Limited series; adaptation of 1974 novel	
Shadow Show: Stories in Celebration of Ray Bradbury		#1–5	Nov 2014 – Mar 2015	Limited series	
Shadowplay		#1–4	Sep 2005 – Dec 2005	Limited series	
Shaun of the Dead		#1–4	Jun 2005 – Aug 2005	Limited series; based on 2004 film	
Shed		#1–6	Jun 2017 – Nov 2017	Limited series	
The Shield: Spotlight		#1–5	Jan 2004 – May 2004	Limited series; based on TV series	
The Silence of Malka		nn	Jun 2018	Graphic novel; published under the EuroComics imprint.	
Silent Hill	Among the Damned	nn	Nov 2004	One-shot	
Silent Hill	Dead/Alive	#1–5	Dec 2005 – Apr 2006	Limited series; sequel to Dying Inside	
Silent Hill	Downpour: Anne's Story	#1–4	Aug 2014 – Nov 2014	Limited series	
Silent Hill	Dying Inside	#1–5	Feb 2004 – Jun 2004	Limited series	
Silent Hill	Hunger	nn	Apr 2006	One-shot; originally released exclusively on the UMD feature The Silent Hill Experience	
Silent Hill	Paint It Black	nn	Feb 2005	One-shot	
Silent Hill	Past Life	#1–4	Oct 2010 – Jan 2011	Limited series	
Silent Hill	Sinner's Reward	#1–4	Feb 2008 – Apr 2008	Limited series	
Silent Hill	The Grinning Man	nn	May 2005	One-shot	
Singularity 7		#1–4	Jul 2004 – Oct 2004	Limited series	
Sinister Dexter		#1–7	Dec 2013 – Jun 2014	Limited series	
Sir Apropos of Nothing		#1–5	Nov 2008 – Mar 2009	Limited series	
Skate Farm	vol. 1	nn	Jan 2009	Graphic novels	
Skate Farm	vol. 2	nn	Apr 2009	Graphic novels	
Skylanders		#0–12	Sep 2014 – Aug 2015	Ongoing series; based on video game series.	
Skylanders	SuperChargers	#1–3	Oct 2015 – Mar 2016	Limited series	
Skylanders	Spyro & Friends: Full Blast!	#1–3	Jul 2017 – Mar 2018	Limited series	
Skylanders	Unexpected Allies	nn	One-shot		
Sleeping Beauties		#1–10	Jun 2020 – Mar 2022	Limited series	
Smoke		#1–3	May 2005 – Jul 2005	Limited series	
Smoke and Mirrors		#1–5	Mar 2012 – Jul 2012	Limited series	
Smokin' Aces		nn	Jan 2007	Promotional comic; movie tie-in	
Snake Eyes & Storm Shadow		#13–21	May 2012 – Jan 2013	Limited series	
Snaked		#1–3	Dec 2007 – Feb 2008	Limited series	
Solo: A Star Wars Story – Graphic Novel Adaptation		nn	Mar 2009	Graphic novel; movie adaptation	
Something Monstrous		nn	Jul 2011	Graphic novel	
Song of Saya		#1–3	Feb 2010 – Apr 2010	Limited series	
Sonic the Hedgehog	vol. 1	#1–59	Apr 2018 – Apr 2023	Limited series	
Sonic the Hedgehog	30th Anniversary FCDB	nn	Aug 2021	Free Comic Book Day exclusive	
Sonic the Hedgehog	30th Anniversary Special	nn	Jun 2021	One-shot	
Sonic the Hedgehog	Annual	2019	nn	Mar 2019	
Sonic the Hedgehog	Annual	2020	nn	Jul 2020	
Sonic the Hedgehog	Annual	2022	nn	Aug 2022	
Sonic the Hedgehog	Bad Guys	#1–4	Sep 2020 – Dec 2020	Limited series	
Sonic the Hedgehog	FCDB	nn	May 2022	Free Comic Book Day exclusive	
Sonic the Hedgehog	Imposter Syndrome	#1–4	Nov 2021 – May 2022	Limited series	
Sonic the Hedgehog	Scrapnik Island	#1–4	Oct 2022 – Jan 2023	Limited series	
Sonic the Hedgehog	Tails' 30th Anniversary Special	nn	Nov 2022	One-shot	
Sonic the Hedgehog	Tangle & Whisper	#0–4	Apr 2019 – Oct 2019	Limited series	
Sonic the Hedgehog 2: The Official Movie Pre–Quill		nn	Mar 2022	One-shot; movie tie-in	
Sons of Chaos		nn	Jul 2019	Graphic novel	
Spacebat and the Fugitives: Tacos @ the End of the World		nn	Oct 2017	Graphic novel	
The Spider King		#1–4	Feb 2018 – May 2028	Limited series	
The Spider King	Frostbite	nn	Dec 2008	One-shot	
Speed Racer	Chronicles of the Racer	#1–4	Feb 2008 – Apr 2008	Limited series; based on manga and anime series	
Speed Racer	The Next Generation: Birthright	#1–4	Nov 2008 – Feb 2009	Limited series; based on TV series	
Spike
Spike		#1–8	Oct 2010 – May 2011	Ongoing series	
Spike	After the Fall	#1–4	Jul 2008 – Oct 2008	Limited series	
Spike	Asylum	#1–5	Sep 2006 – Jan 2007	Limited series	
Spike	Lost and Found	nn	May 2006	One-shot	
Spike	Old Times	nn	Aug 2005	One-shot	
Spike	Old Wounds	nn	Jan 2006	One-shot	
Spike	Shadow Puppets	#1–4	Jun 2007 – Sep 2007	Limited series	
Spike	The Devil You Know	#1–4	Jun 2010 – Sep 2010	Limited series	
Spike	vs. Dracula	#1–5	Feb 2006 – Jun 2006	Limited series	
Spinecrawler		nn	Aug 2011	Graphic novel	
Spookhouse	Book One	nn	Mar 2004	Graphic novels	
Spookhouse	Book Two	nn	Dec 2004	Graphic novels	
Springtime in Chernobyl		nn	April 2019	Graphic novel	
The Squidder		#1–4	Jul 2014 – Oct 2014	Limited series	
Star Mage		#1–6	Apr 2014 – Sep 2014	Limited series	
Star Pig		#1–4	Jul 2019 – Oct 2019	Limited series	
Star Slammers		#1–8	Mar 2014 – Oct 2014	Limited series	
Star Trek	vol. 1	#1–60	Sep 2011 – Aug 2016	Ongoing series	
Star Trek	vol. 2	#400	Sep 2022	Ongoing series	
Star Trek	vol. 2	#1–present	Oct 2022 – present		
Star Trek	Annual	2023	2023		
Star Trek	Assignment: Earth	#1–5	May 2008 – Sep 2008	Limited series	
Star Trek	Boldly Go	#1–18	Oct 2016 – Mar 2018	Limited series	
Star Trek	Burden of Knowledge	#1–4	Jun 2010 – Sep 2010	Limited series	
Star Trek	Captain's Log	Harriman	Apr 2010	One-shot	
Star Trek	Captain's Log	Jellico	Oct 2010	One-shot	
Star Trek	Captain's Log	Pike	Sep 2010	One-shot	
Star Trek	Captain's Log	Sulu	Jan 2010	One-shot	
Star Trek	Countdown	#1–4	Jan 2009 – Apr 2009	Limited series; tie-in to the 2009 film	
Star Trek	Countdown to Darkness	#1–4	Jan 2013 – Apr 2013	Limited series; tie-in to the film Into Darkness	
Star Trek	Crew	#1–5	Mar 2009 – Jul 2009	Limited series	
Star Trek	Deviations	nn	Mar 2017	One-shot	
Star Trek	Ferengi	nn	Apr 2022	One-shot	
Star Trek	Harlan Ellison's The City on the Edge of Forever: The Original Teleplay	#1–5	Jun 2014 – Oct 2014	Limited series	
Star Trek	Hell's Mirror	nn	Aug 2020	One-shot	
Star Trek	Infestation	#1–2	Feb 2011	Limited series; Infestation tie-in	
Star Trek	Leonard McCoy, Frontier Doctor	#1–4	Apr 2010 – Jul 2010	Limited series	
Star Trek	Lower Decks	#1–3	Sep 2022 – Nov 2022	Limited series	
Star Trek	Manifest Destiny	#1–4	Apr 2016 — May 2016	Limited series	
Star Trek	Mirror Images	#1–5	Jul 2008 – Nov 2008	Limited series	
Star Trek	Mission's End	#1–5	Mar 2009 – Jul 2009	Limited series	
Star Trek	Nero	#1–4	Aug 2009 – Nov 2009	Limited series; tie-in to the 2009 film.	
Star Trek	New Frontier — Turnaround	#1–5	Mar 2018 – Jul 2008	Limited series	
Star Trek	New Visions	#1–22	Jun 2014 – Jun 2016	Photo comics	
Star Trek	New Visions	Special	Jul 2016	Adaptation of "The Cage"	
Star Trek	New Visions	Annual	Dec 2013		
Star Trek	Resurgence	#1–5	Nov 2022 – Mar 2023	Limited series	
Star Trek	Special: Flesh and Stone	nn	Jul 2014	One-shot	
Star Trek	Spock: Reflections	#1–4	Jul 2009 – Oct 2009	Limited series	
Star Trek	Starfleet Academy	#1–5	Dec 2015 – Apr 2016	Limited series	
Star Trek	The Mirror War	#0–8	Aug 2021 – Aug 2022	Limited series	
Star Trek	The Mirror War	Data	Dec 2021	One-shot	
Star Trek	The Mirror War	Geordi	Mar 2022	One-shot	
Star Trek	The Mirror War	Sisko	Jun 2022	One-shot	
Star Trek	The Mirror War	Troi	Sep 2022	One-shot	
Star Trek	The Official Motion Picture Adaptation	#1–6	Feb 2010 – Aug 2010	Limited series; adaptation of the 2009 film	
Star Trek	The Q Conflict	#1–6	Jan 2019 – Jun 2019	Limited series	
Star Trek	Trill	nn	Nov 2022	One-shot	
Star Trek	Waypoint	#1–6	Sep 2016 – Jul 2017	Limited series	
Star Trek	Waypoint	Special #1	Nov 2018		
Star Trek	Waypoint	Special	Mar 2019	One-shot	
Star Trek	vs. Transformers	#1–5	Sep 2018 – Jan 2019	Limited series	
Star Trek	Year Five	#1–25	Apr 2019 – Jul 2021	Ongoing series	
Star Trek	Year Five	Valentine's Day Special	Feb 2020	Ongoing series	
Star Trek/	Legion of Super-Heroes	#1–6	Oct 2011 – Mar 2012	Limited series; co-published with DC Comics	
Star Trek/	Planet of the Apes: The Primate Directive	#1–5	Dec 2014 – Apr 2015	Limited series; co-published with Boom! Studios	
Star Trek/Green Lantern	Stranger Worlds	#1–6	Dec 2016 – May 2017	Limited series; co-published with DC Comics	
Star Trek/Green Lantern	The Spectrum War	#1–6	Jul 2015 – Dec 2015	Limited series; co-published with DC Comics	
Star Trek: Alien Spotlight	The Gorn	nn	Oct 2007	One-shot	
Star Trek: Alien Spotlight	The Vulcans	nn	Nov 2007	One-shot	
Star Trek: Alien Spotlight	The Andorians	nn	Nov 2007	One-shot	
Star Trek: Alien Spotlight	Orions	nn	Dec 2007	One-shot	
Star Trek: Alien Spotlight	Borg	nn	Jan 2008	One-shot	
Star Trek: Alien Spotlight	Romulans	nn	Feb 2008	One-shot	
Star Trek: Alien Spotlight	Tribbles	nn	Mar 2009	One-shot	
Star Trek: Alien Spotlight	Klingons	nn	Apr 2009	One-shot	
Star Trek: Alien Spotlight	Romulans	nn	May 2009	One-shot	
Star Trek: Alien Spotlight	Q	nn	Aug 2009	One-shot	
Star Trek: Alien Spotlight	Cardassians	nn	Dec 2009	One-shot	
Star Trek: Deep Space Nine	Fool's Gold	#1–4	Dec 2009 – Mar 2010	Limited series	
Star Trek: Deep Space Nine	Too Long a Sacrifice	#1–4	Apr 2020 – Oct 2020	Limited series	
Star Trek: Discovery	Adventures in the 32nd Century	#1–4	Mar 2022 – Jun 2022	Limited series	
Star Trek: Discovery	Aftermath	#1–3	Aug 2019 – Oct 2019	Limited series	
Star Trek: Discovery	Annual	nn	Mar 2018		
Star Trek: Discovery	Captain Saru	nn	Feb 2019	One-shot	
Star Trek: Discovery	Succession	#1–4	Apr 2018 – Jul 2018	Limited series	
Star Trek: Discovery	The Light of Kahless	#1–4	Oct 2017 – Jan 2018	Limited series	
Star Trek: Khan		#1–5	Oct 2013 – Feb 2014	Limited series; tie-in to the film Into Darkness	
Star Trek: Khan	Ruling in Hell	#1–4	Oct 2010 – Jan 2011	Limited series	
Star Trek: Klingons		nn	Feb 2022	One-shot	
Star Trek: Klingons	Blood Will Tell	#1–5	Apr 2007 – Sep 2007	Limited series	
Star Trek: Picard	Countdown	#1–3	Nov 2019 – Jan 2020	Limited series; based on streaming TV series	
Star Trek: Picard	Stargazer	#1–3	Aug 2022 – Nov 2022	Limited series; based on streaming TV series	
Star Trek: Romulans	Schism	#1–3	Sep 2009 – Nov 2009	Limited series	
Star Trek: Romulans	The Hollow Crown	#1–2	Sep 2008 – Oct 2008	Limited series	
Star Trek: The Next Generation	Ghosts	#1–5	Nov 2009 – Mar 2010	Limited series	
Star Trek: The Next Generation	Hive	#1–4	Sep 2012 – Feb 2013	Limited series	
Star Trek: The Next Generation	IDW 20/20	nn	Jan 2019	One-shot	
Star Trek: The Next Generation	Intelligence Gathering	#1–5	Jan 2008 – May 2008	Limited series	
Star Trek: The Next Generation	Mirror Broken	#1–5	May 2017 – Oct 2017	Limited series	
Star Trek: The Next Generation	The Last Generation	#1–5	Nov 2008 – Mar 2009	Limited series	
Star Trek: The Next Generation	The Space Between	#1–6	Jan 2007 – Jul 2007	Limited series	
Star Trek: The Next Generation	Terra Incognita	#1–6	Jul 2018 – Dec 2018	Limited series	
Star Trek: The Next Generation	Through the Mirror	#1–5	May 2018	Limited series	
Star Trek: The Next Generation/Doctor Who: Assimilation²		#1–8	May 2012 – Dec 2012	Limited series	
Star Trek: Voyager	Mirrors & Smoke	nn	Oct 2019	One-shot	
Star Trek: Voyager	Seven's Reckoning	#1–4	Nov 2020 – Feb 2021		
Star Trek: Year Four		#1–6	Jul 2007 – Dec 2007	Limited series	
Star Trek: Year Four	The Enterprise Experiment	#1–5	Apr 2008 – Aug 2008	Limited series	
Star Trek II: The Wrath of Khan		#1–3	Jun 2009 – Jul 2009	Limited series; movie adaptation	
Star Wars	A New Hope: Graphic Novel Adaptation	nn	Aug 2018	Graphic novel; movie adaptation	
Star Wars	Episode I – The Phantom Menace: Graphic Novel Adaptation	nn	Jul 2021	Graphic novel; movie adaptation	
Star Wars	Episode II – Attack of the Clones: Graphic Novel Adaptation	nn	Dec 2021	Graphic novel; movie adaptation	
Star Wars	Return of the Jedi: Graphic Novel Adaptation	nn	Oct 2019	Graphic novel; movie adaptation	
Star Wars	The Empire Strikes Back: Graphic Novel Adaptation	nn	Mar 2019	Graphic novel; movie adaptation	
Star Wars	The Force Awakens: Graphic Novel Adaptation	nn	Aug 2017	Graphic novel; movie adaptation	
Star Wars	The Last Jedi: Graphic Novel Adaptation	nn	Aug 2018	Graphic novel; movie adaptation	
Star Wars	The Rise of Skywalker: Graphic Novel Adaptation	nn	Mar 2021	Graphic novel; movie adaptation	
Star Wars Forces of Destiny	Ahsoka & Padmé	nn	Jan 2018	One-shot	
Star Wars Forces of Destiny	Hera	nn	Jan 2018	One-shot	
Star Wars Forces of Destiny	Leia	nn	Jan 2018	One-shot	
Star Wars Forces of Destiny	Rey	nn	Jan 2018	One-shot	
Star Wars Forces of Destiny	Rose & Paige	nn	Jan 2018	One-shot	
Star Wars: The High Republic Adventures		#1–13	Feb 2021 – Feb 2022	Ongoing series	
Star Wars: The High Republic Adventures	Annual	nn	Dec 2021		
Star Wars: The High Republic Adventures	FCDB	nn	Aug 2021	Free Comic Book Day exclusive	
Star Wars: The High Republic Adventures	Galactic Bake-Off Spectacular	nn	Jan 2022	One-shot	
Star Wars: The High Republic Adventures	The Monster of Temple Peak	#1–4	Aug 2021 – Nov 2021	Limited series	
Star Wars Adventures	vol. 1	#1–32	Sep 2017 – Mar 2020	Ongoing series	
Star Wars Adventures	vol. 2	#1–14	Sep 2020 – Jan 2022	Ongoing series	
Star Wars Adventures	Annual	2018	Apr 2018		
Star Wars Adventures	Annual	2019	May 2019		
Star Wars Adventures	Annual	2020	Aug 2020		
Star Wars Adventures	Annual	2021	Nov 2021		
Star Wars Adventures	Destroyer Down	#1–3	Nov 2018 – Jan 2019	Limited series	
Star Wars Adventures	FCDB	2018	May 2018		
Star Wars Adventures	FCDB	2019	May 2019		
Star Wars Adventures	Flight of the Falcon	nn	Jan 2019	One-shot	
Star Wars Adventures	Ghosts of Vader's Castle	#1–5	Sep 2021 — Oct 2021	Limited series	
Star Wars Adventures	Return to Vader's Castle	#1–5	Oct 2019	Limited series	
Star Wars Adventures	Shadow of Vader's Castle	nn	Oct 2020	One-shot	
Star Wars Adventures	Smuggler's Run	#1–2	Dec 2020 – Jan 2021	Limited series	
Star Wars Adventures	Tales from Vader's Castle	#1–3	Oct 2018	Limited series	
Star Wars Adventures	The Clone Wars	#1–5	Apr 2020 – Sep 2020	Limited series	
Star Wars Adventures	The Weapon of a Jedi	#1–2	May 2021 – Jun 2021	Limited series	
Starcadia Quest		#1–3	Aug 2019	Limited series	
Starstruck		#1–13	Aug 2009 – Sep 2010	Limited series	
Starstruck	Old Proldiers Never Die	#1–6	Feb 2017 – Jul 2017	Limited series	
Strange Nation		nn	Aug 2015	Graphic novel	
Strange Science Fantasy		#1–6	Jul 2010 – Dec 2010	Limited series; anthology written and illustrated by Scott Morse	
Stranger Things and Dungeons & Dragons		#1–4	Nov 2020 – Feb 2021	Limited series; co-published with Dark Horse Comics	
Strawberry Shortcake		#1–8	Apr 2016 – Nov 2016	Limited series	
Strawberry Shortcake	Funko Universe	nn	May 2017	One-shot	
Street Fighter × G.I. Joe		#1–6	Feb 2006 – Jul 2006	Limited series	
Stretch Armstrong and the Flex Fighters		#1–3	Jan 2018 – Mar 2018	Limited series; based on TV series	
String Divers		#1–5	Aug 2015 — Dec 2015	Limited series	
The Suicide Forest		#1–4	Dec 2010 – Mar 2011	Limited series	
Suicide Girls		#1–4	Mar 2011 – Jun 2011	Limited series	
Sukeban Turbo		#1–4	Nov 2018 – Feb 2019	Limited series	
Super Bad James Dynomite		#1–5	Jan 2006 – Feb 2007	Limited series	
Super Deluxe Hero Happy Hour: The Lost Episode		nn	Aug 2006	One-shot	
Super Trash Clan		nn	Nov 2022	Graphic novel	
SuperF*ckers Forever		#1–5	Aug 2016 – Dec 2016	Limited series	
Supermarket		#1–4	Feb 2006 – Jun 2006	Limited series	
Supernatural Freak Machine: A Cal McDonald Mystery		#1–3	Mar 2005 – May 2005	Limited series	
Sword of Ages		#1—5	Nov 2017 – Jul 2018	Limited series	
Sword of My Mouth		#1	May 2009		
Synergy: A Hasbro Creators Showcase		nn	Mar 2019	One-shot	

== T ==
Title	Series	Issues	Dates	Notes	Reference
Tangled: The Series		#1–3	Jan 2018 – Mar 2018	Limited series; based on TV series	
Tangled: The Series	Hair and Now	#1–3	Mar 2019 – May 2019	Limited series; based on TV series	
Tangled: The Series	Hair It Is	–	Aug 2019	One-shot; based on the TV series	
Tangled: The Series	Hair-Raising Adventures	#1–3	Sep 2018 – Nov 2018	Limited series; based on the TV series	
Tales from the Darkside		#1–4	Jun 2016 – Sep 2016	Limited series; based on TV series	
Tank Girl	The Royal Escape	#1–4	Mar 2010 – Jun 2010	Limited series	
Tank Girl	The Gifting	#1–4	May 2007 – Aug 2007	Limited series	
Tank Girl	Visions of Booga	#1–4	May 2008 – Aug 2008	Limited series	
Team Sonic Racing		–	Oct 2018	One-shot	
Teenage Mutant Ninja Turtles		#1–140	Aug 2011 – present	Ongoing series	
Teenage Mutant Ninja Turtles	30th Anniversary Special	–	May 2014	One-shot	
Teenage Mutant Ninja Turtles	40th Anniversary Comics Celebration	–	Jul 2024	One-shot	
Teenage Mutant Ninja Turtles	Alpha	–	Jun 2024	One-shot	
Teenage Mutant Ninja Turtles	Annual	2012	October 2012	Annual	
Teenage Mutant Ninja Turtles	Annual	2014	August 2014	Annual	
Teenage Mutant Ninja Turtles	Annual	2020	Jul 2020	Annual	
Teenage Mutant Ninja Turtles	Annual	2021	Jun 2021	Annual	
Teenage Mutant Ninja Turtles	Annual	2022	Mar 2022	Annual	
Teenage Mutant Ninja Turtles	Black White & Green	#1–present	May 2024 – present	Limited series	
Teenage Mutant Ninja Turtles	Casey & April	#1–4	Jun 2015 – Sep 2015	Limited series	
Teenage Mutant Ninja Turtles	Deviations	–	Mar 2016	One-shot	
Teenage Mutant Ninja Turtles	Dimension X	#1–5	Aug 2017	Limited series	
Teenage Mutant Ninja Turtles	FCDB	2015	Jun 2015		
Teenage Mutant Ninja Turtles	FCDB	2017	May 2017		
Teenage Mutant Ninja Turtles	FCDB	2019	May 2019		
Teenage Mutant Ninja Turtles	FCDB	2022	May 2022		
Teenage Mutant Ninja Turtles	Funko Universe	–	May 2017	One-shot	
Teenage Mutant Ninja Turtles	Halloween Edition	–	Oct 2012	Halloween ComicFest exclusive	
Teenage Mutant Ninja Turtles	IDW 20/20	–	Jan 2019	One-shot	
Teenage Mutant Ninja Turtles	Infestation 2	#1–2	Mar 2012	Limited series; Infestation 2 tie-in	
Teenage Mutant Ninja Turtles	Macro-Series	#1–4	Sep 2018 – Dec 2018	Limited series	
Teenage Mutant Ninja Turtles	Mutanimals	#1–4	Feb 2015 – May 2015	Limited series	
Teenage Mutant Ninja Turtles	New Animated Adventures	FCDB	May 2013	Ongoing series; based on the 2012 TV series	
Teenage Mutant Ninja Turtles	New Animated Adventures	#1–24	Jul 2013 – Jun 2015	Ongoing series; based on the 2012 TV series	
Teenage Mutant Ninja Turtles	Road to 100	–	Nov 2019	One-shot	
Teenage Mutant Ninja Turtles	Shredder in Hell	#1–5	Jan 2019 – Jun 2019	Limited series	
Teenage Mutant Ninja Turtles	Splintered Fate	–	Nov 2019	One-shot	
Teenage Mutant Ninja Turtles	The Secret History of the Foot Clan	#1–4	Dec 2012 – Mar 2013	Limited series	
Teenage Mutant Ninja Turtles	Turtles in Time	#1–4	Jun 2014 – Sep 2014	Limited series	
Teenage Mutant Ninja Turtles	Universe	#1–25	Aug 2016 – Aug 2018	Limited series	
Teenage Mutant Ninja Turtles	The Untold Destiny of the Foot Clan	#1–5	Mar – Jul 2024	Limited series	
Teenage Mutant Ninja Turtles	Urban Legends	#1–26	May 2018 – Aug 2020	Limited series	
Teenage Mutant Ninja Turtles	Utrom Empire	#1–4	Jan 2014 – Mar 2014	Limited series	
Teenage Mutant Ninja Turtles	vs. Street Fighter	#1–5	May 2023 – Nov 2023	Limited series	
Teenage Mutant Ninja Turtles: Amazing Adventures		#1–14	Aug 2015 – Sep 2016	Ongoing series, based on the 2012 TV series	
Teenage Mutant Ninja Turtles: Amazing Adventures	Carmelo Anthony Special	–	May 2016	One-shot	
Teenage Mutant Ninja Turtles: Amazing Adventures	Robotanimals!	#1–3	Jun 2017 – Sep 2017	Limited series	
Teenage Mutant Ninja Turtles: Bebop & Rocksteady	Destroy Everything	#1–5	Jun 2016	Limited series	
Teenage Mutant Ninja Turtles: Bebop & Rocksteady	Hit the Road	#1–5	Aug 2018	Limited series	
Teenage Mutant Ninja Turtles: Color Classics	vol. 1	#1–11	May 2012 – Jun 2013	Limited series	
Teenage Mutant Ninja Turtles: Color Classics	vol. 2	#1–7	Nov 2013 – May 2014	Limited series	
Teenage Mutant Ninja Turtles: Color Classics	vol. 3	#1–15	Jan 2015 – Mar 2016	Limited series	
Teenage Mutant Ninja Turtles: Color Classics	Donatello	#1	Mar 2013		
Teenage Mutant Ninja Turtles: Color Classics	Leonardo	#1	Apr 2013		
Teenage Mutant Ninja Turtles: Color Classics	Michaelangelo	#1	Dec 2012		
Teenage Mutant Ninja Turtles: Color Classics	Raphael	#1	Aug 2012		
Teenage Mutant Ninja Turtles: Micro-Series		#1–8	Nov 2011 – Sep 2012	Limited series	
Teenage Mutant Ninja Turtles: Micro-Series	Villains	#1–8	Apr 2013 – Nov 2013	Limited series	
Teenage Mutant Ninja Turtles: Jennika		#1–3	Feb 2020 – Jun 2020	Limited series	
Teenage Mutant Ninja Turtles: Jennika	II	#1–6	Nov 2020 – Apr 2021	Limited series	
Teenage Mutant Ninja Turtles: Saturday Morning Adventures	vol. 1	#1–3	Oct 2022 – Jan 2023	Limited series	
Teenage Mutant Ninja Turtles: Saturday Morning Adventures	vol. 2	#1–present	May 2023 – present	Ongoing series	
Teenage Mutant Ninja Turtles: Saturday Morning Adventures	April Special	–	Apr 2024	One-shot	
Teenage Mutant Ninja Turtles: Saturday Morning Adventures	Halloween Special	–	Oct 2023	One-shot	
Teenage Mutant Ninja Turtles: Saturday Morning Adventures	IDW Endless Summer	–	Aug 2023	One-shot	
Teenage Mutant Ninja Turtles: The Armageddon Game		#1–8	Sep 2022 – 2023	Limited series	
Teenage Mutant Ninja Turtles: The Armageddon Game	Opening Moves	#1–2	Jul 2022 – Aug 2022	Limited series	
Teenage Mutant Ninja Turtles: The Armageddon Game	Pre-Game	–	Apr 2022	One-shot	
Teenage Mutant Ninja Turtles: The Armageddon Game	The Alliance	#1–6	Nov 2022 – 2023	Limited series	
Teenage Mutant Ninja Turtles: The Last Ronin		#1–5	Aug 2020 – Feb 2022	Limited series	
Teenage Mutant Ninja Turtles: The Last Ronin	II: Re-Evolution	#1–present	Mar 2024 – present	Limited series	
Teenage Mutant Ninja Turtles: The Last Ronin	Lost Day Special	–	Jun 2023	One-shot	
Teenage Mutant Ninja Turtles: The Last Ronin	Lost Years	#1–3	Jan – Aug 2023	Limited series	
Teenage Mutant Ninja Turtles/Ghostbusters		#1–4	Oct 2014 – Jan 2015	Limited series	
Teenage Mutant Ninja Turtles/Ghostbusters	2	#1–5	Nov 2017	Limited series; sequel	
Teenage Mutant Ninja Turtles x	Naruto	#1–4	Nov 2024 – present	Limited series; co-published with Viz Media	
Teenage Mutant Ninja Turtles x	Stranger Things	#1–4	Jul – Oct 2023	Limited series; co-published with Dark Horse Comics	
Teenage Mutant Ninja Turtles/Usagi Yojimbo		–	Jul 2017	One-shot	
Teenage Mutant Ninja Turtles/Usagi Yojimbo	Saturday Morning Adventures	#1	Jun 2024	One-shot	
Teenage Mutant Ninja Turtles/Usagi Yojimbo	Wherewhen	#1–5	Apr 2023 – Jul 2023	Limited series	
Terminator Salvation	Official Movie Prequel	#1–4	Jan 2009 – Apr 2009	Limited series; movie tie-in	
Terminator Salvation	Official Movie Preview	#0	Apr 2009	One-shot; movie adaptation	
Tet		#1–4	Sep 2015 – Dec 2015	Limited series	
That Hellbound Train		#1-4	Jun 2011 – Aug 2011	Limited series	
The Thief of Always		#1–3	Jan 2005 – May 2005	Limited series; adaptation of the 1992 Clive Barker novel.	
Thumbprint		#1–3	Jun 2013 – Aug 2013	Limited series	
T.H.U.N.D.E.R. Agents		#1–8	Aug 2013 – Apr 2014	Limited series	
Time & Vine		#1–3	Jul 2017 – Oct 2017	Limited series	
Time Management for Anarchists		#1	Dec 2008		
Transformers	vol. 1	#1–31	Nov 2009 – Dec 2011	Ongoing series	
Transformers	vol. 2	#35–57	Nov 2014 – Oct 2016	Ongoing series; retitled from Robots in Disguise and continued from #34	
Transformers	vol. 3	#1–43	Mar 2019 – May 2022	Ongoing series	
Transformers	All Hail Megatron	#1–16	Jul 2008 – Oct 2009	Limited series	
Transformers	All Hail Megatron	Focus on: Decepticons!	Mar 2008	One-shot	
Transformers	Annual	2017	Feb 2017	Annual	
Transformers	Annual	2021	May 2021	Annual	
Transformers	Autocracy	#1–12	Jan 2012 – Jun 2012	Limited series	
Transformers	Continuum	–	Nov 2009	One-shot; recap of previous storylines up to that point, beginning from Infiltration and concluding with All Hail Megatron	
Transformers	Combiner Hunters	–	Jul 2015	One-shot	
Transformers	Combiner Wars	#1–12	2014	Limited series	
Transformers	Devastation	#1–6	Sep 2007 – Feb 2008	Limited series	
Transformers	Deviations	–	Mar 2016	One-shot	
Transformers	Escalation	#1–6	Nov 2006 – Apr 2007	Limited series	
Transformers	Escape	#1–5	Dec 2020 – Apr 2021	Limited series	
Transformers	Evolutions – Hearts of Steel	#1–4	Jun 2006 – Sep 2006	Limited series	
Transformers	Fall of Cybertron	–	Mar 2013	One-shot	
Transformers	Fate of Cybertron	–	Jun 2022	One-shot	
Transformers	FCBD	–	May 2006	Free Comic Book Day exclusive	
Transformers	First Strike	–	Oct 2017	One-shot; First Strike tie-in	
Transformers	Galaxies	#1–12	Sep 2019 – Oct 2020	Limited series	
Transformers	Generations	#1–12	Mar 2006 – Mar 2007	Ongoing series	
Transformers	Halloween	–	Sep 2021		
Transformers	Heart of Darkness	#1–4	Mar 2011 – Jun 2011	Limited series	
Transformers	Historia	–	Dec 2018		
Transformers	Holiday Special	–	Dec 2015		
Transformers	Infestation	#1–2	Feb 2011	Limited series; Infestation tie-in	
Transformers	Infestation 2	#1–2	Feb 2012	Limited series; Infestation 2 tie-in	
Transformers	Infiltration	#1–6	Jan 2006 – Jun 2006	Limited series	
Transformers	Ironhide	#1–4	May 2010 – Aug 2010	Limited series	
Transformers	King Grimlock	#1–5	Aug 2021 – Feb 2022	Limited series	
Transformers	Last Bot Standing	#1–4	May 2022 – Aug 2022	Limited series	
Transformers	Last Stand of the Wreckers	#1–5	Jan 2010 – May 2010	Limited series	
Transformers	Lost Light	#1–25	Dec 2016 – Oct 2018	Limited series	
Transformers	Maximum Dinobots	#1–5	Dec 2008 – Apr 2009	Limited series	
Transformers	Megatron – Origin	#1–4	May 2007 – Sep 2007	Limited series	
Transformers	Monstrosity	#1–12	Jun 2013 – Sep 2013	Limited series	
Transformers	Nefarious	#1-6	Mar 2010 – Aug 2010	Limited series; set in the film series continuity	
Transformers	Primacy	#1–4	Aug 2014 – Nov 2014	Limited series	
Transformers	Punishment	–	Jan 2015	One-shot	
Transformers	Redemption	–	Oct 2015	One-shot	
Transformers	Regeneration One	#80. 5	May 2012	Limited series; sequel series returning to the Marvel Comics continuity 21 years on, concluding two years later on the franchise's 30th anniversary	
Transformers	Regeneration One	#81-100	July 2012 – March 2014	Limited series; sequel series returning to the Marvel Comics continuity 21 years on, concluding two years later on the franchise's 30th anniversary	
Transformers	Requiem of the Wreckers	–	May 2018	Annual; sequel to Sins of the Wreckers	
Transformers	Revolution	–	Oct 2016	One-shot; Revolution tie-in	
Transformers	Rodimus vs. Cyclonus	–	Jan 2011	One-shot	
Transformers	Salvation	–	Jun 2017	One-shot	
Transformers	Sector 7	#1–5	Sep 2010 – Jan 2011	Limited series; set in the film series continuity	
Transformers	Sins of the Wreckers	#1–5	Nov 2015 – May 2016	Limited series; sequel to Last Stand of the Wreckers	
Transformers	Stormbringer	#1–4	Jul 2006 – Oct 2006	Limited series	
Transformers	The Animated Movie	#1–4	Oct 2006 – Jan 2007	Limited series; movie adaptation	
Transformers	The Death of Optimus Prime	–	December 21, 2011	One-shot; stand-alone story celebrating the first 125 issues of the first ongoing series	
Transformers	Tales of the Fallen	#1–6	Aug 2009 – Jan 2010	Limited series; set in the film series continuity	
Transformers	Target: 2006	#1–5	Apr 2007 – Aug 2007	Limited series	
Transformers	Titans Return	–	Jul 2016	One-shot	
Transformers	Unicron	#1–7	May 2018 – Nov 2018	Limited series	
Transformers	Valentine's Day Special	–	Feb 2020		
Transformers	War's End	#1–4	Feb 2022 – May 2018	Limited series	
Transformers (2007)	Official Movie Adaptation	#1–4	Jun 2007	Limited series; movie adaptation	
Transformers (2007)	Official Movie Prequel	#1–4	Feb 2007 – May 2007	Limited series; movie tie-in, a black and white variant cover was published earlier in February 21, 2007	
Transformers (2007)	Official Movie Prequel	Special	Jun 2008	Limited series; movie tie-in, a black and white variant cover was published earlier in February 21, 2007	
Transformers (2007)	Saga of the Allspark	#1–4	Jul 2008 – Oct 2008	Limited series; prequel	
Transformers (2007)	The Reign of Starscream	#1–5	Apr 2008 – Aug 2008	Limited series; sequel	
Transformers: Animated	Bots of Science	–	Oct 2010	Graphic novel	
Transformers: Animated	FCDB	2008	May 2008		
Transformers: Animated	FCDB	2009	May 2009	Flipbook with G.I. Joe	
Transformers: Animated	The Arrival	#1–6	Aug 2008 – Dec 2008	Limited series; based on the 2007 animated TV series	
Transformers: Beast Wars	vol. 1	#1–17	Feb 2021 – Jun 2022	Ongoing series	
Transformers: Beast Wars	vol. 1	2022 Annual	Apr 2022	Ongoing series	
Transformers: Beast Wars	The Ascending	#1–4	Oct 2007 – Jan 2008	Limited series	
Transformers: Beast Wars	The Gathering	#1–4	Feb 2006 – May 2006	Limited series	
Transformers: Beast Wars	Sourcebook	#1–4	Aug 2007 – Feb 2008		
Transformers: Bumblebee		#1–4	Dec 2009 – Mar 2010	Limited series	
Transformers: Bumblebee	Go for the Gold!	–	Dec 2018	Graphic novel	
Transformers: Bumblebee	Official Prequel to the Upcoming Movie	#1–4	Jun 2018 – Sep 2018	Limited series; movie tie-in	
Transformers: Bumblebee	Win if You Dare	–	Sep 2018	Graphic novel	
The Transformers: Dark Cybertron		–	Nov 2013		
The Transformers: Dark Cybertron	Finale	–	Mar 2014		
Transformers: Dark of the Moon	Foundation	#1–4	Feb 2011 – May 2011	Limited series; movie tie-in	
Transformers: Dark of the Moon	Movie Adaptation	#1–4	Jun 2011	Limited series; movie adaptation	
Transformers: Dark of the Moon	Rising Storm	#1–4	Feb 2011 – May 2011	Limited series; movie tie-in	
The Transformers: Drift	vol. 1	#1–4	Sep 2010 – Oct 2010	Limited series	
The Transformers: Drift	Empire of Stone	#1–4	Nov 2014 – Feb 2015	Limited series	
The Transformers: More Than Meets the Eye		#1–57	Jan 2012 – Sep 2016	Ongoing series	
The Transformers: More Than Meets the Eye	Annual 2012	–	Aug 2012	Annual	
The Transformers: More Than Meets the Eye	Revolution	–	Nov 2016	One-shot; Revolution tie-in	
Transformers: Prime		#1–4	Jan 2011	Limited series; based on the animated TV series	
Transformers: Prime	Beast Hunters	#1–8	May 2013 – Dec 2013	Limited series; based on the animated TV series	
Transformers: Prime	Rage of the Dinobots	#1–4	Nov 2012 – Apr 2013	Limited series; based on the animated TV series	
Transformers: Revenge of the Fallen	Movie Prequel: Alliance	#1–4	Dec 2008 – Mar 2009	Limited series; movie tie-in	
Transformers: Revenge of the Fallen	Movie Prequel: Defiance	#1–4	Jan 2009 – Apr 2009	Limited series; movie tie-in	
Transformers: Revenge of the Fallen	Official Movie Adaptation	#1–4	May 2009 – Jun 2009	Limited series; movie adaptation	
Transformers: Robots in Disguise	vol. 1	#1–34	Jan 2012 – Oct 2014	Ongoing series; later retitled The Transformers from #35, not to be confused with the similar title below	
Transformers: Robots in Disguise	vol. 2	#1–6	Jul 2015 – Dec 2015	Limited series; based on the 2015 animated TV series	
Transformers: Robots in Disguise	Annual	2012	Sep 2012		
FCDB	2015	Jun 2015	Free Comic Book Day exclusive		
Transformers: Shattered Glass	vol. 1	#1–5	Aug 2021 – Dec 2021	Limited series	
Transformers: Shattered Glass	II	#1–5	Aug 2022 – Dec 2022	Limited series	
The Transformers: Spotlight	Arcee	–	Feb 2008	One-shot	
The Transformers: Spotlight	Blaster	–	Jan 2008	One-shot	
The Transformers: Spotlight	Blurr	–	Nov 2008	One-shot	
The Transformers: Spotlight	Bumblebee	–	Mar 2013	One-shot	
The Transformers: Spotlight	Cliffjumper	–	Jun 2009	One-shot	
The Transformers: Spotlight	Cyclonus	–	Jun 2008	One-shot	
The Transformers: Spotlight	Doubledealer	–	Aug 2008	One-shot	
The Transformers: Spotlight	Drift	–	Apr 2009	One-shot	
The Transformers: Spotlight	Drift: Directors Cut	–	Jun 2014	One-shot	
The Transformers: Spotlight	Galvatron	–	Jul 2007	One-shot	
The Transformers: Spotlight	Grimlock	–	Mar 2008	One-shot	
The Transformers: Spotlight	Hardhead	–	Jul 2008	One-shot	
The Transformers: Spotlight	Hoist	–	May 2013	One-shot	
The Transformers: Spotlight	Hot Rod	–	Nov 2006	One-shot	
The Transformers: Spotlight	Jazz	–	Mar 2009	One-shot	
The Transformers: Spotlight	Kup	–	Apr 2007	One-shot	
The Transformers: Spotlight	Megatron	–	Feb 2013	One-shot	
The Transformers: Spotlight	Mirage	–	Mar 2008	One-shot	
The Transformers: Spotlight	Nightbeat	–	Oct 2006	One-shot	
The Transformers: Spotlight	Optimus Prime	–	Aug 2007	One-shot	
The Transformers: Spotlight	Optimus Prime: 3-D Edition	–	Nov 2008	One-shot	
The Transformers: Spotlight	Orion Pax	–	Dec 2012	One-shot	
The Transformers: Spotlight	Prowl	–	Apr 2010	One-shot	
The Transformers: Spotlight	Ramjet	–	Nov 2007	One-shot	
The Transformers: Spotlight	Shockwave	–	Sep 2006	One-shot	
The Transformers: Spotlight	Sideswipe	–	Sep 2008	One-shot	
The Transformers: Spotlight	Six Shot	–	Dec 2006	One-shot	
The Transformers: Spotlight	Soundwave	–	Mar 2007	One-shot	
The Transformers: Spotlight	Thundercracker	–	Jan 2013	One-shot	
The Transformers: Spotlight	Trailcutter	–	Apr 2013	One-shot	
The Transformers: Spotlight	Ultra Magnus	–	Jan 2007	One-shot	
The Transformers: Spotlight	Wheelie	–	Jun 2008	One-shot	
The Transformers: Till All Are One		#1–12	Jun 2016 – Dec 2017	Limited series	
The Transformers: Till All Are One	Annual 2017	–	Dec 2017	Annual	
The Transformers: Till All Are One	Revolution	–	Oct 2016	One-shot; Revolution tie-in	
The Transformers: Windblade	vol. 1	#1–4	Apr 2014 – Jul 2014	Limited series	
The Transformers: Windblade	vol. 2	#1–7	Mar 2015 – Sep 2015	Limited series; Combiner Wars tie-in	
Transformers/	Back to the Future	#1–4	Oct 2020 – Jan 2021	Limited series	
Transformers/	Ghostbusters	#1–5	Jun 2019 – Oct 2019	Limited series	
Transformers/My Little Pony	Friendship in Disguise!	#1–4	Aug 2020 – Nov 2020	Limited series	
Transformers/My Little Pony	The Magic of Cybertron	#1–4	Apr 2021 – Jul 2021	Limited series; sequel to Friendship in Disguise!	
Transformers '84		#0	Aug 2019		
Transformers '84	Secrets & Lies	#1–4	Jul 2020 – Oct 2020	Limited series	
Transformers vs.	The Terminator	#1–4	Mar 2020 – Sep 2020	Limited series; co-published with Dark Horse Comics	
Transformers vs.	Visionaries	#1–5	Dec 2017 – Apr 2018	Limited series	
Transformers vs. G.I. Joe		#1–13	Jul 2014 – Jun 2017	Limited series	
Transformers vs. G.I. Joe	FCDB 2014	#0	May 2014	Limited series	
Transformers vs. G.I. Joe	The Movie Adaptation	–	Mar 2017	Limited series	
Transfusion		#1–3	Oct 2012 – Feb 2013	Limited series	
Tribes: The Dog Years		–	Jul 2010	Graphic novel	
Trio		#1–4	May 2012 – Aug 2012	Limited series	
Triple Helix		#1–4	Oct 2013 – Jan 2014	Limited series	
True Blood		#1–14	May 2012 – Jun 2013	Ongoing series; based on TV series	
True Blood	All Together Now	#1–6	Jul 2010 – Nov 2010	Limited series; based on TV series	
True Blood	Tainted Love	#1–6	Feb 2011 – Jul 2011	Limited series; based on TV series	
True Blood	The French Quarter	#1–6	Aug 2011 – Jan 2012	Limited series; based on TV series	
Trve Kvlt		#1–5	Aug 2022 – Dec 2022	Limited series	
Turistas: The Other Side of Paradise		–	Nov 2006		

== U ==
Title	Series	Issues	Dates	Notes	Reference
Uncle $crooge		#1–56 (#405–456)	Apr 2015 – Apr 2020	Ongoing series; previously published by Dell, Gold Key, Disney, Gladstone, Gemstone and Boom! Studios resumed from #404.	
Uncle $crooge	My First Millions	#1–4	Sep 2018 – Dec 2018	Limited series	
Underworld		nn	Jan 2004	One-shot; movie adaptation	
Underworld	Evolution	nn	Dec 2005	One-shot; movie adaptation	
Underworld	Red in Tooth and Claw	#1–3	Feb 2004 – Apr 2004	Limited series	
Underworld	Rise of the Lycans	#1–2	Nov 2008	Limited series; movie adaptation	
Usagi Yojimbo		#1–31	Jun 2019 – Sep 2022	Ongoing series	
Usagi Yojimbo	Color Classics	#1–7	Jan 2020 – Sep 2020	Limited series	
Usagi Yojimbo	Dragon Bellow Conspiracy	#1–6	Jun 2021 – Nov 2021	Limited series	
Usagi Yojimbo	FCDB	2020	2020	Free Comic Book Day exclusive	
Usagi Yojimbo	Halloween ComicFest	nn	Oct 2019	One-shot; Halloween ComicFest exclusive	
Usagi Yojimbo	Lone Goat and Kid	#1–6	Jan 2022 – Jun 2022	Limited series	
Usagi Yojimbo	Wanderer's Road	#1–6	Nov 2020 – Apr 2021	Limited series	

== V ==
Title	Series	Issues	Dates	Notes	Reference
V Wars		#0 + 1–11	Apr 2014 – Mar 2015	Limited series	
V Wars	God of Death	nn	Apr 2019	One-shot	
The Vanishers		nn	May 2002	Graphic novel	
The Veil		#1–4	Jun 2009 – Oct 2009	Limited series	
The Very Big Monster Show		nn	Dec 2004	Graphic novel	
Victorie City		#1–4	Jan 2016 – Apr 2016	Limited series	
Vitriol the Hunter		#1–6	Feb 2013 – Jul 2013	Limited series	
Voyage to the Stars		#1–4	Aug 2020 – Nov 2020	Limited series	

== W ==
Title	Series	Issues	Dates	Notes	Reference
Wake the Dead		#1–5	Sep 2003 – Mar 2004	Limited series	
Walt Disney Showcase		#1–6	Jan 2018 – Jun 2018	Limited series	
Walt Disney's Comics and Stories		#1–22 (#721–743)	Jul 2015 – Jul 2018	Ongoing series; previously published by Dell, Gold Key, Disney, Gladstone, Gemstone and Boom! Studios and resumed from #720.	
War of the Undead		#1–3	Jan – Apr 2007	Limited series	
We Will Bury You		#1–4	Feb 2010 – Jun 2010	Limited series	
Weekly World News		#1-4	Jan 2010 – Apr 2010	Limited series	
Weird Love		#1–24	May 2014 – May 2018	Ongoing series	
Welcome to Hoxford		#1-4	Aug 2008 – Nov 2008	Limited series	
Wellington		#1–5	Dec 2009 – Sep 2020	Limited series	
Whatmen?!		nn	Feb 2009	One-shot	
Whatmen?!		nn	Feb 2011	Graphic novel	
Will Eisner's John Law	Dead Man Walking				
Will Eisner's John Law	Angels and Ashes, Devils and Dust	#1–4	Apr 2006	Limited series	
Winterworld		#1–7	Jun 2014 – Jun 2015	Limited series	
Winterworld	Wire Hangers	#1–4	Apr 2010 – Aug 2010	Limited series	
Witch & Wizard: Battle for Shadowland		#1–8	May 2010 – Jan 2011	Limited series	
Womanthology: Space		#1-5	Sep 2012 – Feb 2013	Limited series	
Wormwood: Gentleman Corpse		#1–7	Jul 2006 – Mar 2007	Limited series	
Wormwood: Gentleman Corpse	Calamari Rising	#1–4	Dec 2007 – Mar 2008	Limited series	
Wormwood: Gentleman Corpse	Christmas Special	nn	Dec 2017	One-shot	
Wormwood: Gentleman Corpse	Down the Pub	#1	Dec 2008	One-shot	
Wormwood: Gentleman Corpse	Mr Wormwood Goes to Washington	#1–3	Sep 2017 – Nov 2017	Limited series	
Wormwood: Gentleman Corpse	Segue to Destruction	#0	Nov 2007	One-shot	
Wormwood: Gentleman Corpse	The Taster	#0	Apr 2006	One-shot	
Wraith		#1–7	Nov 2013 – May 2014	Limited series	
Wynonna Earp		#1–8	Feb 2016 – Sep 2016	Limited series	
Wynonna Earp	Bad Day at Black Rock	nn	Sep 2019	Graphic novel	
Wynonna Earp	Home on the Strange	#1–3	Dec 2003 – Feb 2004	Limited series	
Wynonna Earp	Legends	#1–4	Nov 2016 – Feb 2017	Limited series	
Wynonna Earp	Season Zero	#1–5	Jun 2017 – Oct 2017	Limited series	
Wynonna Earp	The Yeti Wars	#1–4	May 2011 – Aug 2011	Limited series	

== X ==
Title	Series	Issues	Dates	Notes	Reference
The X-Files		#1–17	Apr 2016 – Aug 2017	Ongoing series	
The X-Files	Annual	2014	Apr 2014		
The X-Files	Annual	2015	Jul 2015		
The X-Files	Annual	2016	Jul 2016		
The X-Files	Deviations	nn	Mar 2016	One-shot	
The X-Files	Funko Universe	nn	May 2017	One-shot	
The X-Files	JFK Disclosure	#1–2	Oct 2017 – Nov 2017	Limited series	
The X-Files	Season 10	#1–26	Jun 2013 – Jun 2015	Ongoing series	
The X-Files	Season 11	#1–8	Aug 2015 – Mar 2016	Limited series	
The X-Files	X-Mas Special		Dec 2014		
The X-Files	X-Mas Special	2015	Dec 2015		
The X-Files	X-Mas Special	2016	Dec 2016	One-shot	
The X-Files	Year Zero	#1–5	Jul 2014 – Nov 2014	Limited series	
The X-Files: Case Files	Florida Man	#1–2	Apr 2018 – May 2018	Limited series	
The X-Files: Case Files	Hoot Goes There?	#1–2	Jul 2018 – Aug 2018	Limited series	
The X-Files: Conspiracy		#1–2	Jan 2014 – Mar 2014	Limited series	
The X-Files: Conspiracy	Ghostbusters	#1	Jan 2014	One-shot	
The X-Files: Conspiracy	Teenage Mutant Ninja Turtles	#1	Feb 2014	One-shot	
The X-Files: Conspiracy	The Crow	#1	Mar 2014	One-shot	
The X-Files: Conspiracy	The Transformers	#1	Feb 2014	One-shot	
The X-Files: Origins		#1–4	Aug 2016 – Nov 2016	Limited series	
The X-Files: Origins	Dog Days of Summer	#1–4	Jun 2017 – Sep 2017	Limited series; sequel story.	
The X-Files/30 Days of Night		#1–6	Sep 2010 – Feb 2011	Limited series; co-published with WildStorm, which held the comic rights to The X-Files at the time.	

== Y ==
Title	Series	Issues	Dates	Notes	Reference
Yakuza Demon Killers		#1–4	Nov 2016 – Feb 2017	Limited series	
Ye		nn	Apr 2019	Graphic novel; published under the Top Shelf Productions imprint	
Yellow Cab		nn	May 2022	Graphic novel	
Yo-kai Watch		#1–3	Apr 2017 – Jun 2017	Limited series	
Young Donald Duck		nn	Nov 2019	Graphic novel	
Yours Truly, Jack the Ripper		#1–3	Jun 2010 – Aug 2010	Limited series; adaptation of the 1943 short story of the same title by Robert Bloch, originally published in Weird Tales (July 1943).	

== Z ==
Title	Series	Issues	Dates	Notes	Reference
The Zaucer of Zilk		#1–2	Oct 2012 – Nov 2012	Limited series	
Zombie War		#1–2	Oct 2013 – Nov 2013	Limited series	
Zombies!	Eclipse of the Undead	#1–4	Nov 2006 – Feb 2007	Limited series	
Zombies!	Feast	#1–5	May 2006 – Oct 2006	Limited series	
Zombies!	Hunters	#1	May 2008		
Zombies vs. Robots	vol. 1	#1–2	Oct 2006 – Dec 2006	Limited series	
Zombies vs. Robots	vol. 1	#0	January 26, 2011	Limited series	
Zombies vs. Robots	vol. 2	#1–10	Jan 2015 – Oct 2015	Ongoing series	
Zombies vs. Robots	Annual	2012	May 2012		
Zombies vs. Robots	Aventure	#1–4	Feb 2010 – May 2010	Limited series	
Zombies vs. Robots	Undercity	#1–4	Apr 2011 – Jul 2011	Limited series	
Zombies vs. Robots	Women on War!	#1	November 2012	One-shot	
Zombies vs. Robots	vs. Amazons	#1–3	Sep 2007 – Feb 2008	Limited series	
