= Gutter Magic =

- Cover to Gutter Magic #1 (January 2016).

Publication information
- Publisher: IDW Publishing
- Schedule: Monthly
- Format: Limited series
- Publication date: January 2016 - April 2016
- No. of issues: 4

Creative team
- Written by: Rich Douek
- Artist: Brett Barkley

Collected editions
- July 26, 2016: ISBN 1631406590

Gutter Magic is a four part limited series of comic books written by Rich Douek and illustrated by Brett Barkley, published by IDW Publishing with the first part released in January 2016. All four parts were published in a trade paperback released on July 19, 2016.

== Publication history ==
Gutter Magic was originally published in 2012 as a New York Comic Con exclusive. Published by Sixgun comics, it consisted as a collection of three short stories and retailed at 99c.

On July 21, 2014, IDW had announced an alliance with Comics Experience, LLC, an online comics education resource and creative community, which would focus on publishing creator-owned titles by new writers. Along with the deal, four new mini-series had been announced to be released starting from January 2015 which were Drones, Creature Cops: Special Varmint Unit, Gutter Magic and Tet, with IDW Editor and Comics Experience alum Bobby Curnow watching over the deal. Editor-In-Chief of IDW Chris Ryall said in a statement "IDW has been a strong supporter of creator-owned comics, from our very first title, 30 Days of Night, through to Locke & Key and beyond. We’re now excited to be partnering with Comics Experience to introduce the next wave of new talent to fans and the industry." It was reprinted by Source Point Press in 2020.

=== Tales from the Gutter ===
In 2017, Douek launched a Kickstarter to produce Tales From the Gutter: A Gutter Magic Anthology. The comic will expand upon the stories in the original series and include what couldn't be told previously.

== Plot ==
Set in modern-day New York City where World War II had been fought with magic and wizards are the elitists, the series follows Cinder Byrnes, a member of a wealthy family of magic users, who was born without powers and his journey to learn how to cast spells.

== Reception ==
Reviews for the series had generally been positive, with review aggregator website Comic Book Roundup giving the series an average score of 8.0 out of 10.

=== Sales ===
According to ICv2, issue #1 was one of the top 300 comics sold of January, 2016, with approximately 4,577 copies sold, making it the first comic by Comics Experience to ever appear on the list.

== Collected editions ==
The series has been collected into a trade paperback:

Title	Material collected	Publication date	ISBN
Gutter Magic	Gutter Magic 1-4	July 2016 (SC)	1631406590
