= The Transformers: Generations =

- Issue #1 cover by Ashley Wood

Publication information
- Publisher: IDW Publishing
- Schedule: Monthly
- Format: Ongoing
- Publication date: since March 2006
- Main character(s): Autobots, Decepticons

Creative team
- Created by: Hasbro
- Written by: Various
- Artist(s): Various

The Transformers: Generations is a comic book title, published by IDW Publishing. The series was launched in March 2006 and conceived to be a nine-issue miniseries, but has since become an ongoing title. The series consists of republished editions of the original Marvel Transformers comics, but featuring new cover art by various artists. The series finished at issue 12. However, IDW have continued to reprint older material, including Dreamwave's Transformers: Armada comic in their Transformers Magazine, as well as condensed reprints of the Marvel UK tale Target: 2006. IDW continues to reprint Marvel UK material, beginning with issues focusing on the Dinobots.

== Issues ==
=== Marvel US reprints ===
- Issue #1: Reprint of The Transformers (Marvel US) #7 by Bob Budiansky and William Johnson, cover art by Nick Roche, Ashley Wood
- Issue #2–3: Reprint of The Transformers (Marvel US) #13–14 by Bob Budiansky and Don Perlin, cover art by Nick Roche, Ashley Wood
- Issue #4: Reprint of The Transformers (Marvel US) #16 by Len Kaminski and Graham Nolan, cover art by Nick Roche
- Issue #5: Reprint of The Transformers (Marvel US) #17 by Bob Budiansky and Graham Nolan, cover art by Nick Roche, Ashley Wood
- Issue #6: Reprint of The Transformers (Marvel US) #18 by Bob Budiansky and Don Perlin, cover art by Nick Roche
- Issue #7–8: Reprint of The Transformers (Marvel US) #24–25 by Bob Budiansky and Don Perlin, cover art by Nick Roche
- Issue #9: Reprint of The Transformers (Marvel US) #27 by Bob Budiansky and Don Perlin, cover art by Nick Roche
- Issue #10–12: Reprint of The Transformers (Marvel US) #29–31 by Bob Budiansky and Don Perlin, cover art by Nick Roche

=== The Transformers: Target: 2006 ===
- Issue #1: Reprint of The Transformers "Target: 2006" by Simon Furman and Geoff Senior, cover art by Nick Roche
- Issue #2–4: Reprint of The Transformers "Target: 2006" by Simon Furman, Jeff Anderson and Will Simpson, cover art by Nick Roche
- Issue #5: Reprint of The Transformers "Target: 2006" by Simon Furman, Geoff Senior, Jeff Anderson and Will Simpson, cover art by Nick Roche

=== The Transformers: Best of UK: Dinobots ===
- Issue #1: Reprint of The Transformers "The Icarus Theory" by Simon Furman and Barry Kitson, cover art by Nick Roche
