= Star Mage =

2014 comic book series

Publication information
- Publisher: IDW Publishing
- Format: Ongoing series
- Genre: Science fiction, fantasy
- Publication date: April – September 2014
- No. of issues: 6
- Main character(s): Darien Connors; Tirwa; Anthaar; Unura; Arylos; Orasmas Xul Sarrum; Douglas Connors

Creative team
- Written by: JC De La Torre
- Artist(s): Ray Dillon; Franco Cespedes

Star Mage is a six-issue comic book limited series released by IDW Publishing. It was created by fiction author JC De La Torre with art by Ray Dillon and Franco Cespedes. Dillon created the art and cover for issue one while Cespedes took over art and cover duties from issues two through six.

== Publication history ==
Star Mage was originally written by De La Torre as a young adult fiction novel called Darien Connors and The Necromancy of Eridu but he decided that the comic medium was the best place for his story. After teaming with artists Ray Dillon and Franco Cespedes, the creative team developed Star Mage into a six-issue mini-series. Star Mage #1 was released on April 16, 2014, beginning a run of six issues.

== Plot synopsis ==
Darien Connors seems like a normal nerdy kid attending Cocoa Beach High. He has a crush on a girl, gets into trouble with bullies and lives a typical normal life – with one exception – his famous astronaut father. His father, Douglas Connors, is an astronaut who was lost on a crewed mission to Mars. Bullies hurt Darien by stringing him up on the school flagpole and suddenly Darien manifests strange magical powers. Using the powers, he frees himself and races into the woods, where he is taken up in a spaceship by Arylos. Arylos informs Darien that he is not from Earth and is a Star Mage – a wizard with magical powers called kishpu. Darien would later find out that his father Douglas was actually Dalidor the Magnificent and his brother Orasmas Xul Sarrum was the leader of a rebel sect of mages called the Bel Etu. It's up to Darien, Arylos, and his new friends Tirwa, Anthaar, and Unura to stop Orasmas and his secret weapon.

== Characters ==
=== Darien Connors ===
Darien is the son of King Dalidor and Queen Kaela of Eridu. Raised on Earth by his father after Orasmas' rebellion, Darien was ignorant in the ways of his sect, the Sarru Kishpu.

=== Arylos ===
An 8th scepter Et Lu Star Mage of the Sarru Kishpu, Arylos was tasked by King Thordar and the council to find Dalidor and his family and return them to Eridu. After discovering Darien orphaned on Earth, Arylos is tasked with being his guardian.

=== Orasmas Xul Sarrum ===
Darien's brother and leader of a rival sect of Star Mages called the Bel Etu. Orasmas, like Darien, is a 10th level Scepter – the most powerful level of Star Mages. His power enables him to command a large army of wizards bent on the destruction of the Sarru Kishpu and dominion over the universe.

=== Tirwa ===
The first schoolmate Darien meets on Eridu, Tirwa is one of Darien's closest friends and allies. Her race, the Radeanean has the ability to read minds with their rabbit-like appendages.

=== Anthaar ===
A Wasparie, Anthaar and Darien are members of the same house, Ebabbar, and are close friends. He is the physically strongest among them as his race is known for their attack spells and ability to defend the realm.

=== Unura ===
Another close friend of Darien's, Unura is the quiet, reserved one of the group – speaking only when it's of most importance. Her race, the Notrudarians, have the ability to control the weather and the elements with their kishpu (magic).

== Reception ==
Reviews have been positive regarding Star Mage. Comics – The Gathering called Star Mage #1 "a great premise, fantastic art and tonnes of heart, Star Mage #1 is a great book with tonnes of promise." While Comic Bastard's Adam Kelly gave Star Mage #1 a 10 out 10.

Capeless Crusader called Star Mage "slightly flawed, but overall enjoyable sci-fi/fantasy tale for kids, with a good, relatable lead character."

Unleash The Fan Boy referred to Star Mage #3 as "an awesome story" giving it a 9 out of 10. "Star Mage is a sci-fi romp with a heart," said IDW Publishing editor Tom Waltz. "Part Ender's Game, part Last Starfighter... heck, even part Star Wars... Star Mage remains fresh and exciting, and will appeal to high-adventure readers of all ages!" .

== Interviews ==
- "5 Questions with JC De La Torre". April 15, 2014. Archived from the original on May 15, 2014.
- "De La Torre Finds Magic in Outer Space with Star Mage". Comic Book Resources. February 8, 2010. Archived from the original on April 22, 2014.
- Shannon, Hannah Means (November 4, 2014). "Being a Star Mage Can Change Your Life". Bleeding Cool. Archived from the original on April 13, 2014.
- "Spaceships and Wizards, JC De La Torre talks Star Mage". Flickering Myth. March 14, 2014.
- "IDW unveils JC De La Torre's Star Mage". Digital Spy. February 20, 2014. Archived from the original on March 4, 2016.
