= Super Bad James Dynomite =

Comic book series

Super Bad James Dynomite is a comic book series created by the Wayans Brothers, mainly Shawn Wayans, Marlon Wayans and Keenen Ivory Wayans. The book is about a detective named James Dynomite, who helps the police with crimes in the black community. The book's first story arc featured James battling a white pimp.

== The Book ==
The comic is based upon the 1970s and the era of films known as Blaxploitation. Each issue features various references to movie and characters of that time including John Shaft, Black Belt Jones, Foxy Brown (film), Super Fly and even Bruce Lee. The comics feature scenes of drug use with James sniffing cocaine with various people. There is strong sexual content in various issues. Issue five featured female nudity and various sexual acts. It was the only issue to be sealed before it was sold in comic book stores. Profanity appears in every issue.

== Notes about the comic ==
James Dynomite is designed with Marlon Wayans as the model. James has all of Marlon's facial features while sporting a very large Afro. Various products such as Johnson & Johnson's Shampoo appear in the comic under different names.

== Movie ==
On May 15, 2007, Rouge Pictures optioned the rights to the Wayans Brothers' comic. Marlon and Shawn Wayans have written the feature screenplay with Xavier Cook & Mitchell Marchand. Marlon Wayans will star in the title role of Super Bad James Dynomite, an ex-cop turned neighborhood hero who delivers his unique brand of justice in New York City. He is Shaft, Dolemite, and Black Belt Jones all rolled into one. Dynomite has it all... until the day he is convicted of a crime he didn't commit. When he is released from jail years later, he is still the same but the world has changed. While regaining his cool, Dynomite vows to take down the man responsible for his incarceration – a criminal mastermind who has become the mayor of the city – and swings back into action.
