= M1 carbine =

American auto-loading carbine

Carbine, Caliber .30, M1
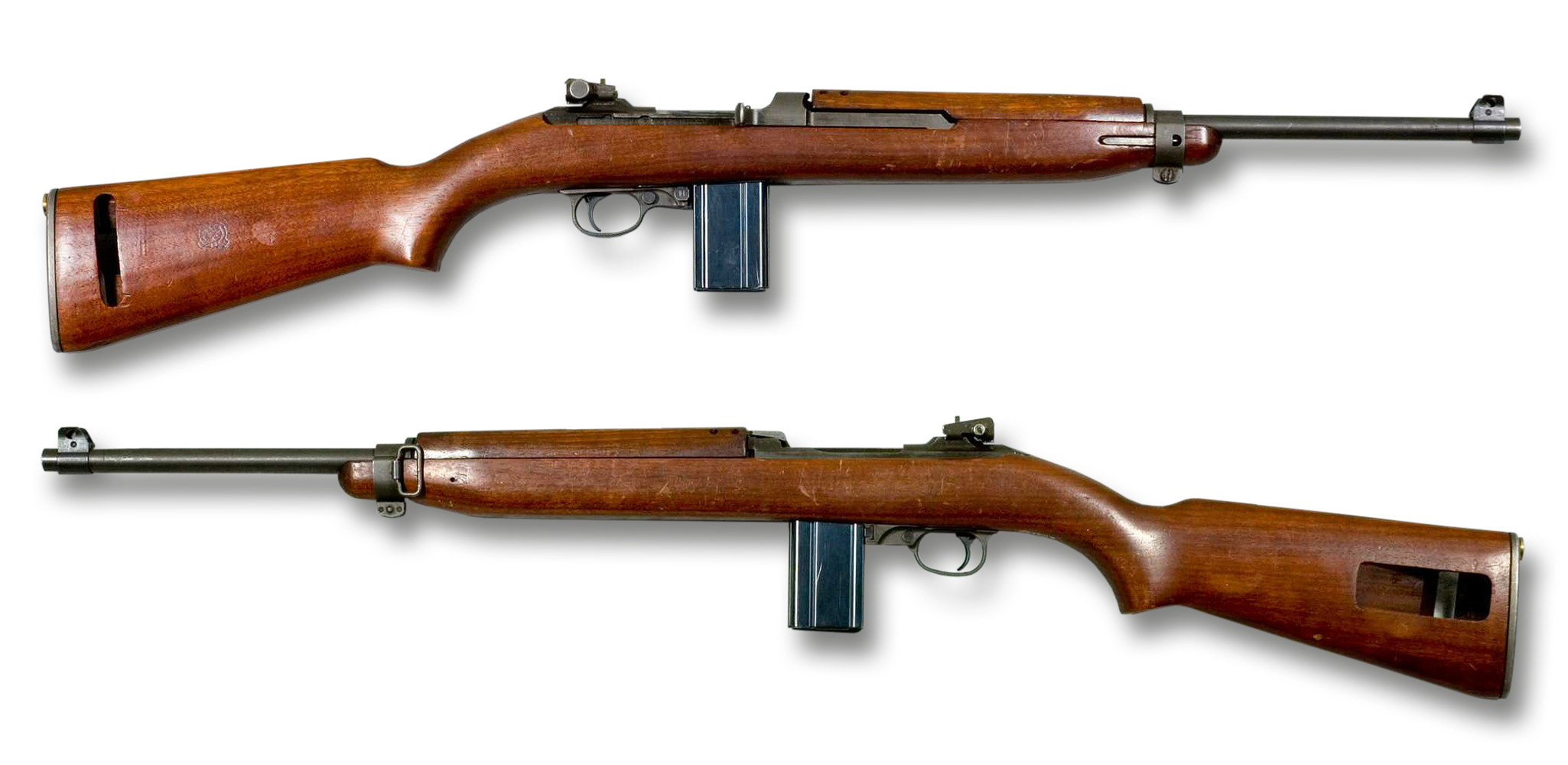
- M1 Carbine
- Type: Semi-automatic rifle
- Place of origin: United States

Service history
- In service: 1942–1973 (United States); 1942–present (other countries)
- Used by: See Users
- Wars: World War II; Hukbalahap Rebellion; Chinese Civil War (limited); First Indochina War; Indonesian National Revolution; Korean War; Malayan Emergency; Second Taiwan Strait Crisis; Algerian War; Suez Crisis; Cuban Revolution; Vietnam War; Laotian Civil War; Bay of Pigs Invasion; Permesta Rebellion; Indonesia–Malaysia confrontation; Ñancahuazú Guerrilla; Six-Day War; Football War; Cambodian Civil War; The Troubles; Angolan Civil War; Black September; Lebanese Civil War; Insurgency in Aceh; Mexican drug war; Syrian Civil War

Production history
- Designer: Fred Humeston; William C. Roemer; David Marshall Williams
- Designed: 1941
- Manufacturer: Military contractors; Commercial copies
- Unit cost: About $45 (WWII) (equivalent to $840 in 2025)
- Produced: July 1942 – August 1945 (U.S. military); 1945–present (commercial)
- No. built: 6,121,309 (WWII)
- Variants: See Variants

Specifications
- Mass: 5.2 lb (2.4 kg) empty 5.8 lb (2.6 kg) loaded w/sling
- Length: 35.6 in (900 mm)
- Barrel length: 17.75 in (451 mm)
- Cartridge: .30 Carbine
- Action: Gas-operated (short-stroke piston), rotating bolt
- Rate of fire: 60–70 aimed rounds/min (M1/A1); 750 rounds/min (M2)
- Muzzle velocity: 1,990 ft/s (607 m/s)
- Effective firing range: 330 yd (300 m)
- Feed system: 15- or 30-round detachable box magazine
- Sights: Rear sight: aperture; L-type flip or adjustable; Front sight: wing-protected post

The M1 Carbine (formally the United States Carbine, Caliber .30, M1) is a lightweight semi-automatic rifle chambered in the .30 carbine (7.62×33mm) cartridge that was issued to the U.S. military during World War II, the Korean War, and the Vietnam War. The M1 Carbine was produced in several variants and was widely used by military, paramilitary, and police forces around the world after World War II, most notably by the armed forces of South Korea and South Vietnam.

The M2 Carbine is the selective-fire version of the M1 Carbine, capable of firing in both semi-automatic and full-automatic. The M3 Carbine was an M2 Carbine with an active infrared scope system.

Despite having a similar name and physical outward appearance, the M1 Carbine is not a carbine version of the M1 Garand rifle. On 1 July 1925, the U.S. Army began using the current naming convention where the "M" is the designation for "Model" and the number represents the sequential development of equipment and weapons. Therefore, the "M1 Carbine" was the first carbine developed under this system. The "M2 Carbine" was the second carbine developed under the system, etc.

== Development history ==
=== Limitations of weapons in the U.S. arsenal ===
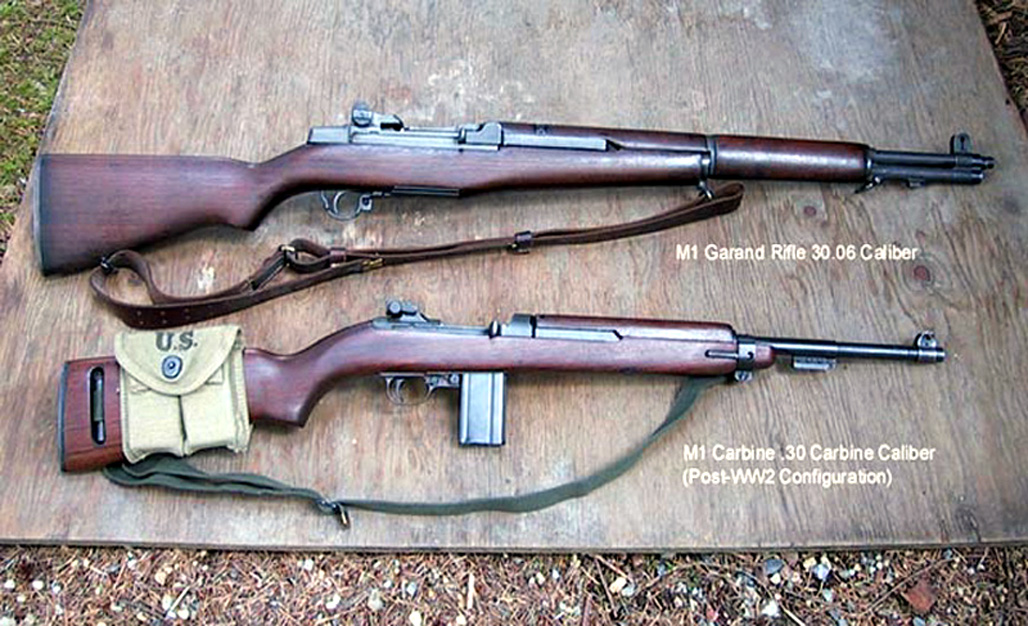
The M1 rifle and M1 Carbine share only a buttplate screw and use different-sized .30 caliber ammunition.

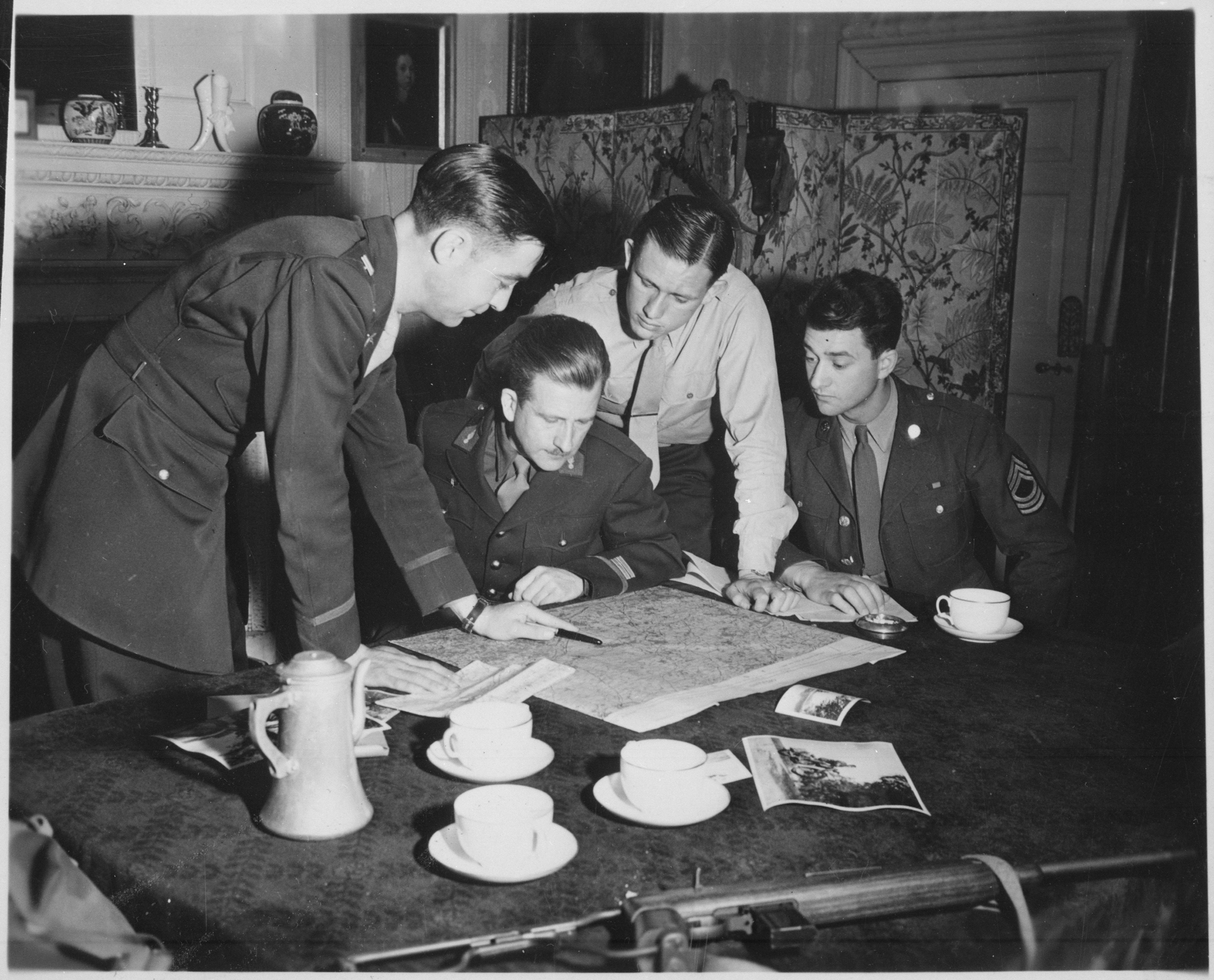
Briefing for staff personnel. A folding stock M1A1 Carbine sits on the table.

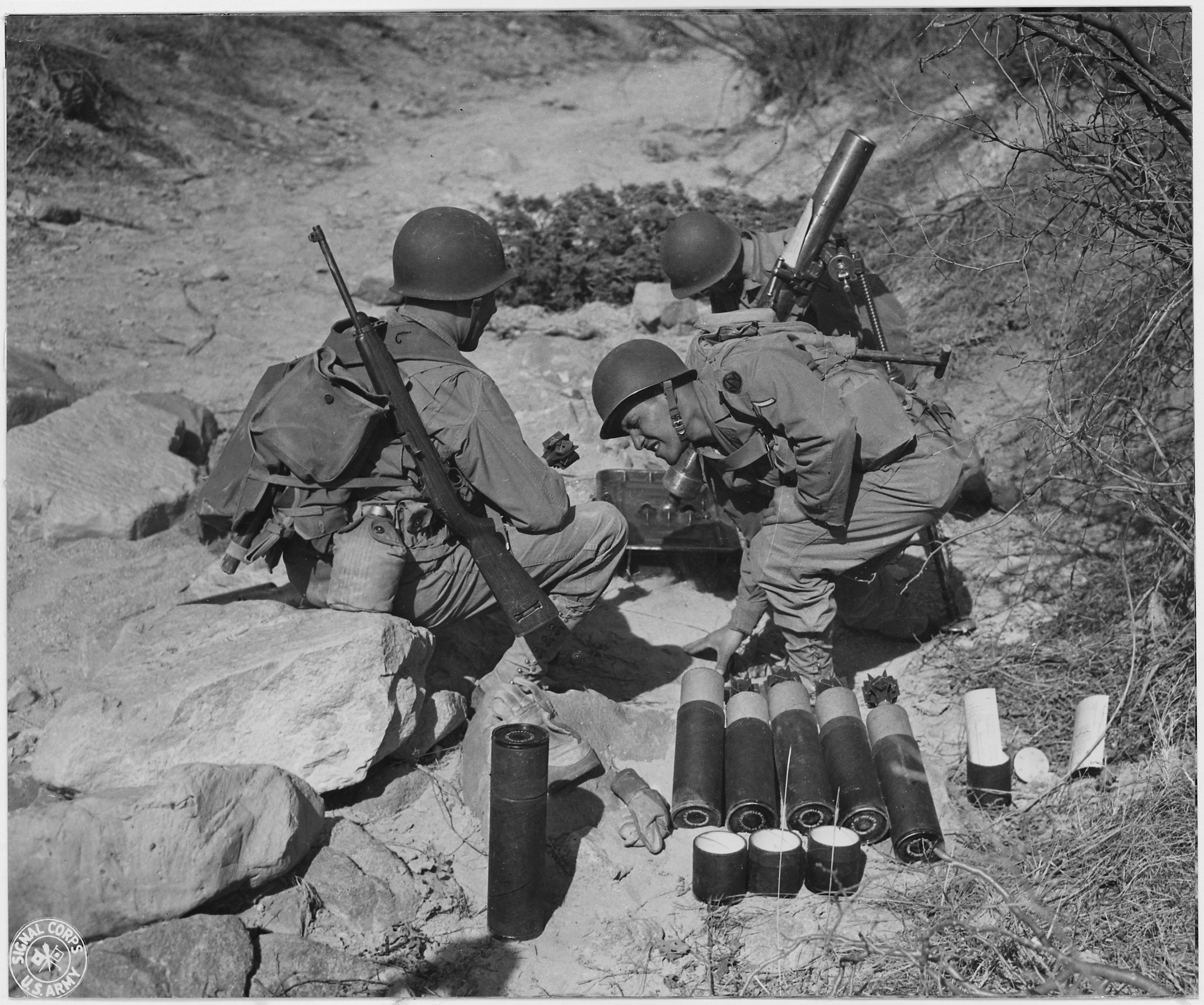
81 mm mortar crew in action at Camp Carson, Colorado, 24 April 1943. The soldier on the left has a slung M1 carbine.

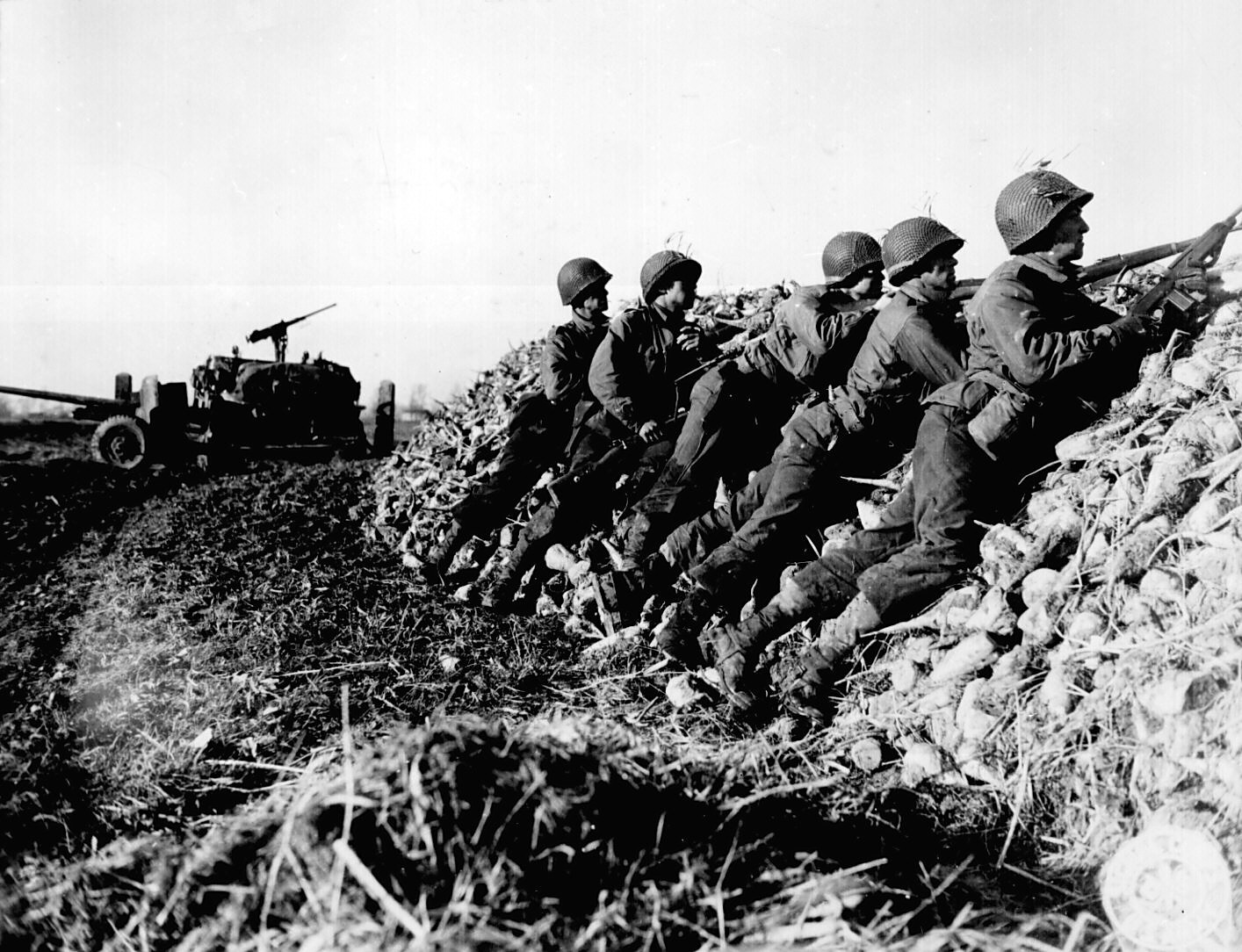
A U.S. anti-tank crew in combat in the Netherlands, 4 November 1944. The soldier on the far right is holding an M1 carbine.

Before World War II, the U.S. Army Ordnance Department received reports that the full-size M1 rifle was too heavy and cumbersome for most support troops (staff, artillerymen, radiomen, etc.) to carry. During pre-war and early war field exercises, it was found that the M1 Garand impeded these soldiers' mobility, as a slung rifle would frequently catch on brush or hit the back of the helmet and tilt it over the eyes, impairing vision. Many soldiers found the rifle slid off the shoulder unless slung diagonally across the back, where it prevented the wearing of standard field packs and haversacks.

Additionally, Germany's use of glider-borne and paratrooper forces to launch surprise blitzkrieg attacks behind the front lines generated a request for a new compact infantry weapon to equip support troops. This request called for a compact, lightweight defensive weapon with greater range, accuracy and firepower than a handgun, while weighing half as much as the Thompson submachine gun or the M1 rifle. The U.S. Army decided that a carbine-type weapon would adequately fulfill all of these requirements, and specified that the new arm should weigh no more than 5 pounds (2.3 kg) and have an effective range of 300 yards (270 m). Paratroopers were also added to the list of intended users and a folding-stock version would also be developed.

=== Design ===
The weapon originated in June 1940, when the U.S. military proposed a lightweight semi-automatic rifle for rear-echelon and support personnel, such as military police, medics, and officers, who were at risk of attack but not expected to carry the full-size M1 Garand. It was designed to use the new .30 Carbine cartridge developed by Winchester, which was approved in early 1941.

Winchester at first did not submit a carbine design, as it was occupied in developing the Winchester G30 rifle. The G30 rifle originated as a design by Jonathan "Ed" Browning, half-brother of the famous firearm designer John Moses Browning. A couple of months after Ed Browning's death in May 1939, Winchester hired David Marshall "Carbine" Williams who had begun work on a short-stroke gas piston design while serving a prison sentence at a North Carolina minimum-security work farm. Winchester, after Williams' release, had hired Williams on the strength of recommendations of firearms industry leaders and hoped Williams would be able to complete various designs left unfinished by Ed Browning, including the Winchester G30 rifle. Williams incorporated his short-stroke piston in the existing design as the G30M. After the Marine Corps' semi-automatic rifle trials in 1940, Browning's rear-locking tilting bolt design proved unreliable in sandy conditions. As a result, Williams redesigned the G30M to incorporate a Garand-style rotating bolt and operating slide, retaining the short-stroke piston as the .30 M2 Winchester Military Rifle. By May 1941, Williams had shaved the M2 rifle prototype from about 9.5 lb (4.3 kg) to 7.5 lb (3.4 kg), about a 29% reduction in weight.

Ordnance found the first series of prototype carbines submitted by several firearms companies and some independent designers. Winchester had contacted the ordnance department to examine their rifle M2 design. Major René Studler of ordnance believed the rifle design could be scaled down to a carbine, which would weigh 4.5 to 4.75 lb (2.04 to 2.15 kg) and demanded a prototype as soon as possible. The first model was developed at Winchester in 13 days by William C. Roemer, Fred Humeston and three other Winchester engineers under the supervision of Edwin Pugsley and was essentially Williams' last version of the .30-06 M2 scaled down to the .30 SL cartridge. This patchwork prototype was cobbled together using the trigger housing and lockwork of a Winchester Model 1905 rifle and a modified Garand operating rod. The prototype was an immediate hit with army observers.

After the initial Army testing in August 1941, the Winchester design team set out to develop a more refined version. Williams participated in the finishing of this prototype. The second prototype competed successfully against all remaining carbine candidates in September 1941, and Winchester was notified of their success the next month. Standardization as the M1 carbine was approved on 22 October 1941. This story was the loose basis for the 1952 movie Carbine Williams starring James Stewart. Contrary to the movie, Williams had little to do with the carbine's development, with the exception of his short-stroke gas piston design. Williams worked on his own design apart from the other Winchester staff, but it was not ready for testing until December 1941, two months after the Winchester M1 carbine had been adopted and type-classified. Winchester supervisor Edwin Pugsley conceded that Williams' final design was "an advance on the one that was accepted" but noted that Williams' decision to go it alone was a distinct impediment to the project, and Williams' additional design features were not incorporated into M1 production. In a 1951 memo written in fear of a patent infringement lawsuit by Williams, Winchester noted his patent for the short-stroke piston may have been improperly granted, as a previous patent covering the same principle of operation was overlooked by the patent office.

In 1973, the senior technical editor at the NRA contacted Edwin Pugsley for "a technical last testament" on M1 Carbine history shortly before his death on 19 November 1975. According to Pugsley, "The carbine was invented by no single man," but was the result of a team effort including: William C. Roemer, David Marshall Williams, Fred Humeston, Cliff Warner, at least three other Winchester engineers, and Pugsley himself. Ideas were taken and modified from the Winchester M2 Browning rifle (Williams' gas system), the Winchester Model 1905 rifle (fire control group and magazine), M1 Garand (buttstock dimensions, and bolt and operating slide principles), and a percussion shotgun in Pugsley's collection (hook breech and barrel band assembly/disassembly).

== Features ==
.30 Carbine cartridge

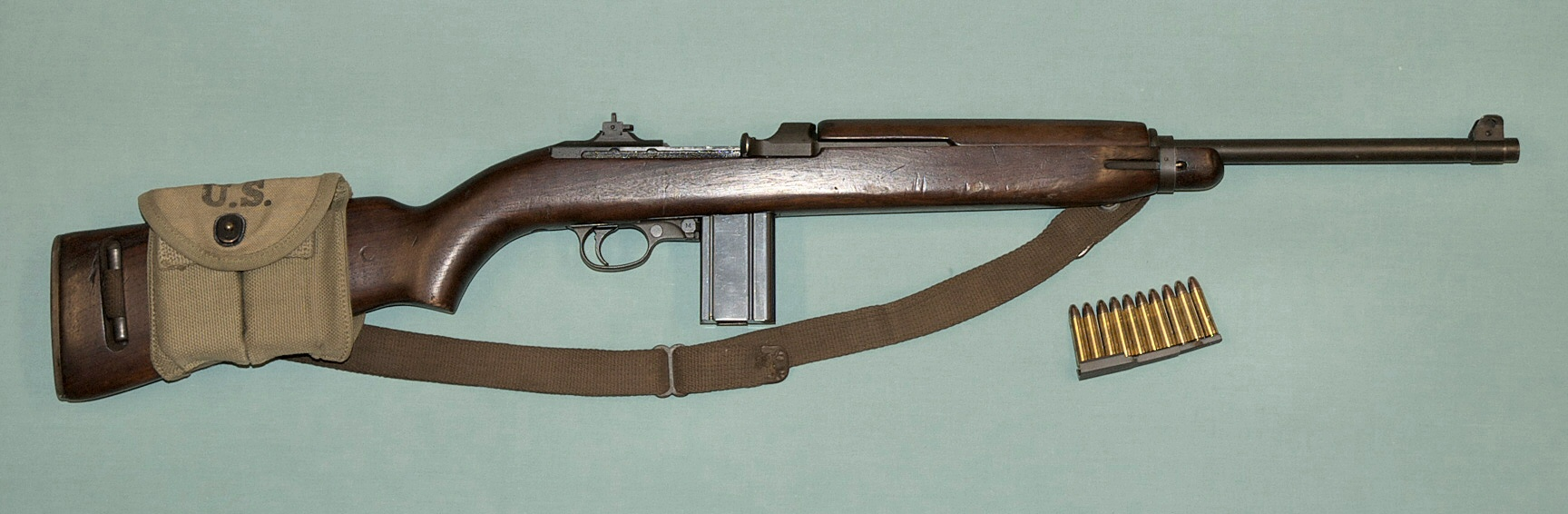
WWII M1 carbine with a magazine pouch mounted on the stock that held two spare 15-round magazines

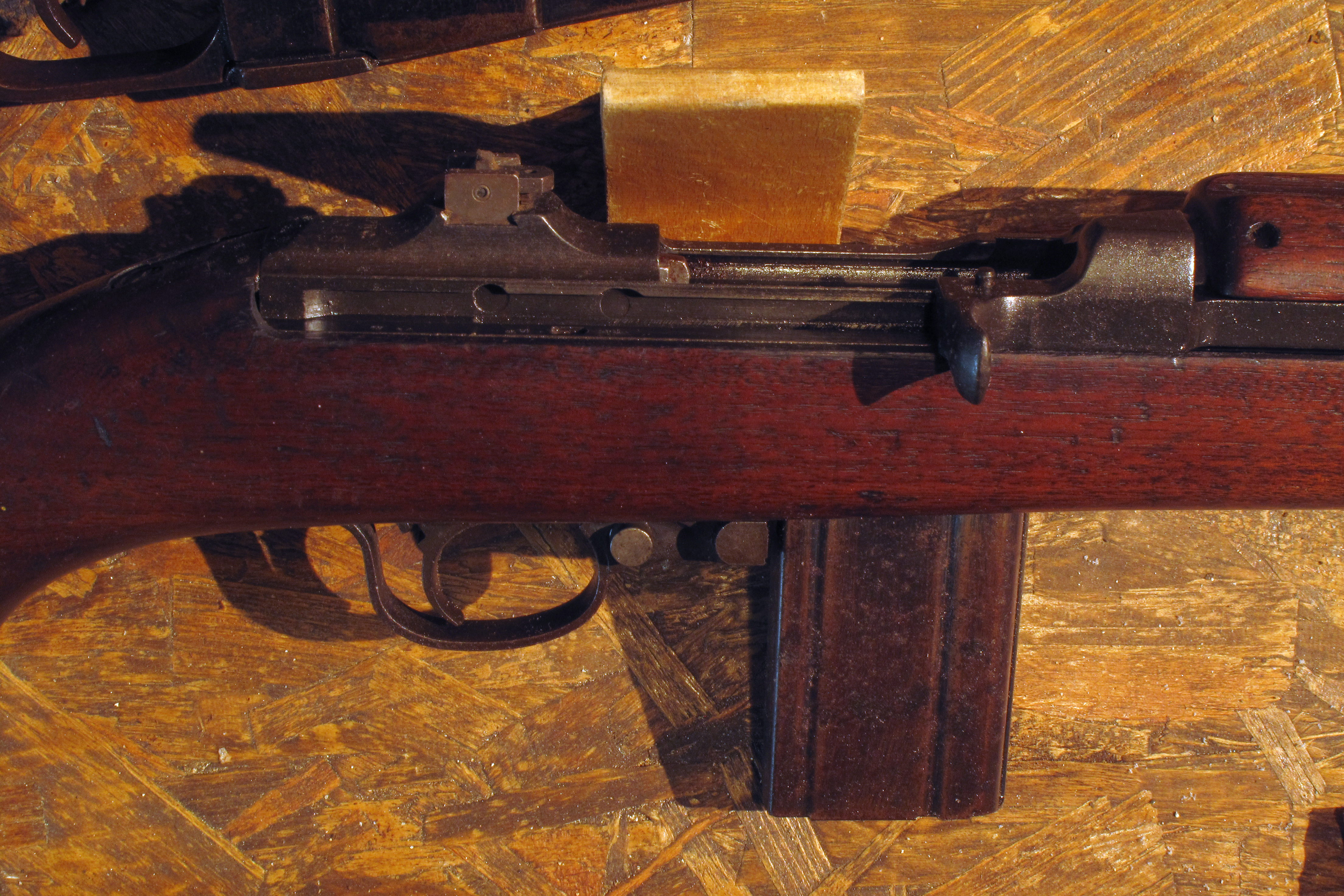
Closeup of M1 carbine receiver with original flip sight and push button safety

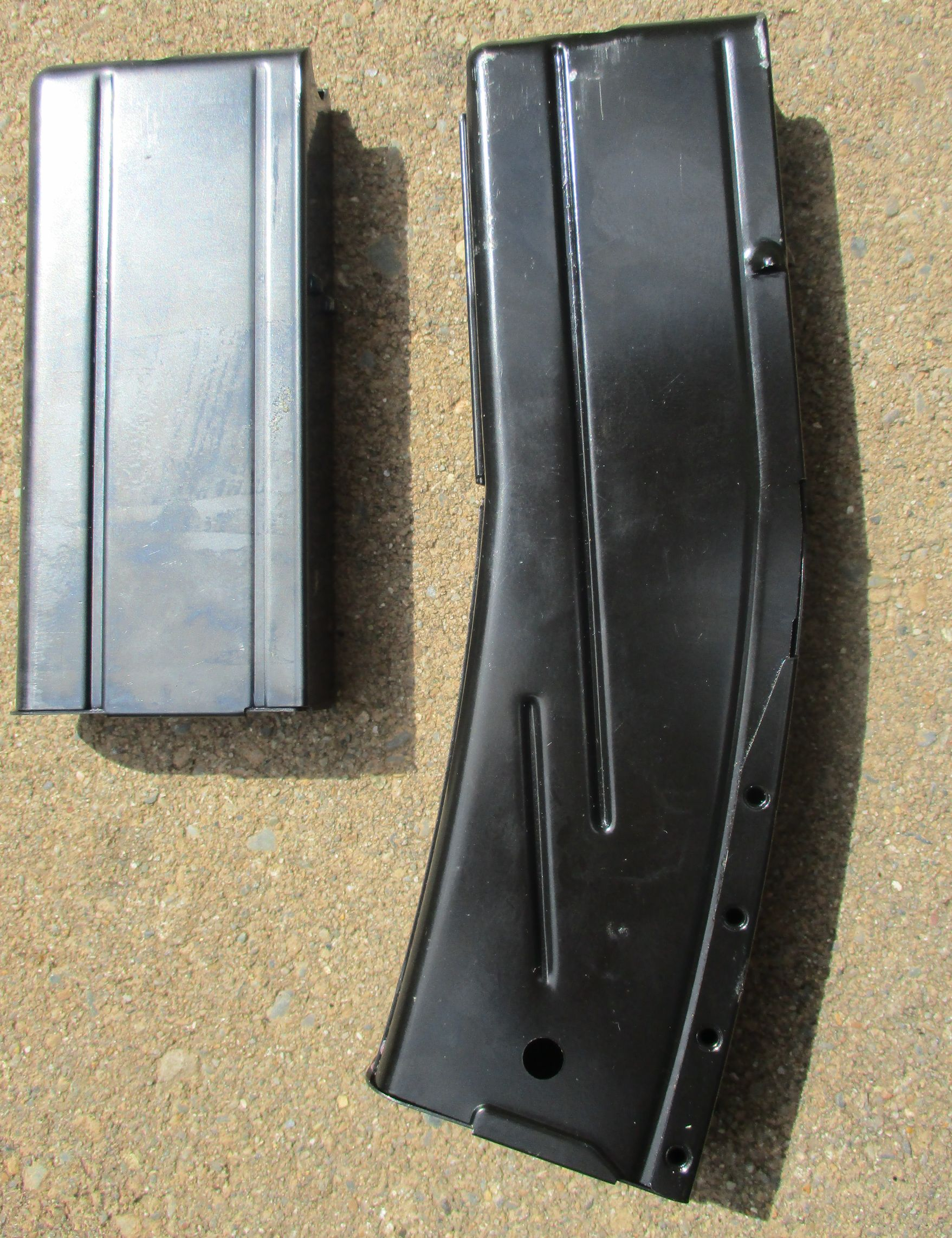
Comparison of M1 carbine magazines, original 15-round on left and 30-round on right

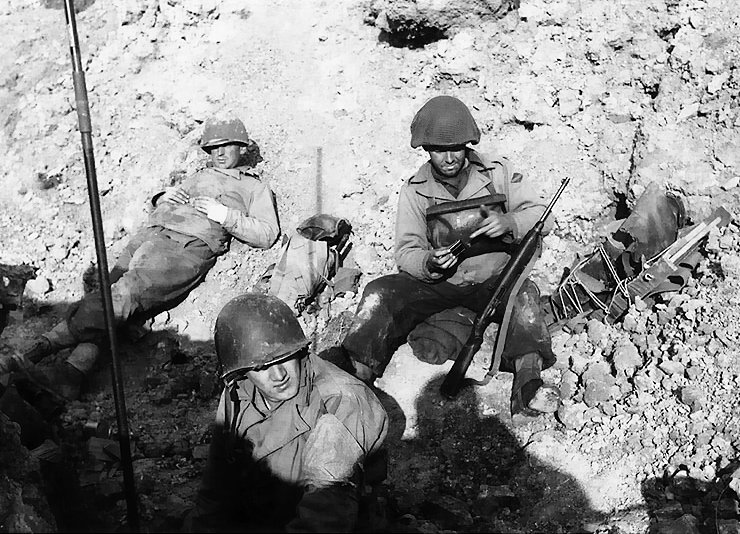
U.S. Army Rangers resting in the vicinity of Pointe du Hoc, which they assaulted in support of "Omaha" Beach landings on "D-Day", 6 June 1944. Ranger in right center is apparently using his middle finger to push cartridges into an M1 carbine magazine. The carbine and a backpack frame are nearby.

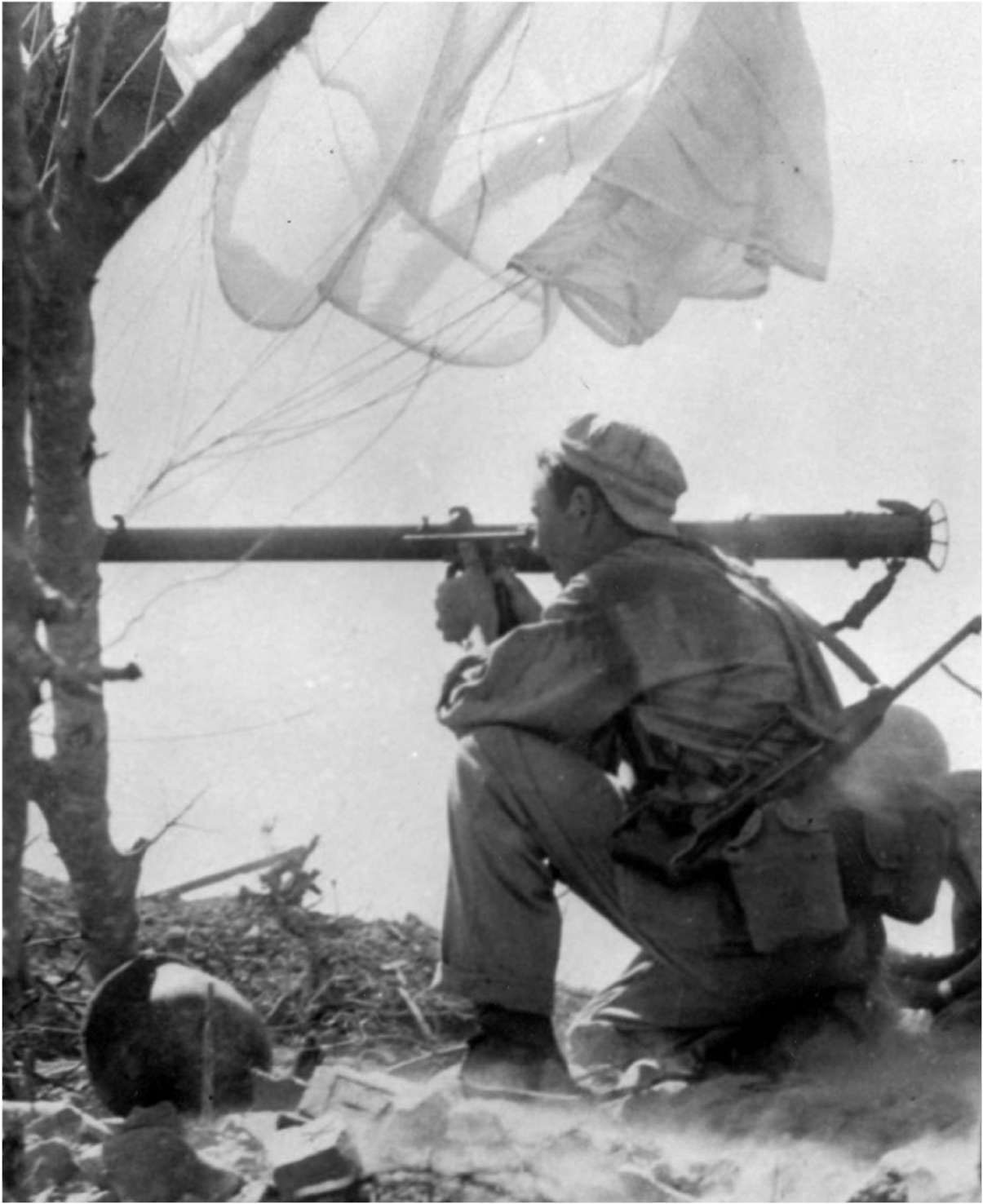
Paratrooper armed with a folding stock M1A1 carbine fires a bazooka at an enemy pillbox on Greary Point, Corregidor

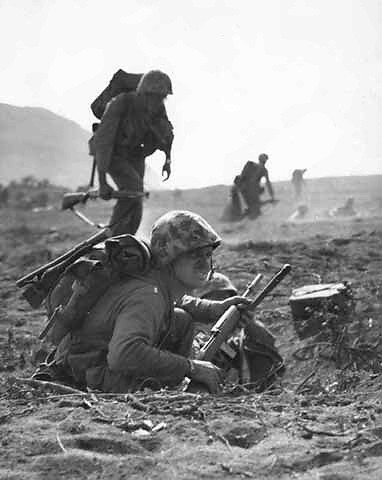
A marine armed with an M1 carbine and M8 grenade launcher attached to the muzzle, during the Battle of Iwo Jima

=== Ammunition ===
The .30 Carbine cartridge is essentially a rimless version of the obsolete .32 Winchester Self-Loading cartridge introduced for the Winchester Model 1905 rifle. The propellant was much newer, though, taking advantage of chemistry advances. As a result, the .30 Carbine cartridge is approximately 27% more powerful than its parent cartridge. A standard .30 Carbine ball bullet weighs 110 grains (7.1 g), a complete loaded round weighs 195 grains (12.6 g) and has a muzzle velocity of 1,990 ft/s (610 m/s) giving it 967 ft·lbf (1,311 joules) of energy, when fired from the M1 carbine's 17.75 in (451 mm) barrel.

In comparison, the .30-06 Springfield ball round used by the M1 Garand is almost three times as powerful as the .30 Carbine, while the carbine round is twice as powerful as the .45 ACP-caliber Thompson submachine gun in common use at the time. As a result, the carbine offers much better range, accuracy and penetration than those submachine guns. The M1 carbine is also half the weight of the Thompson and fires a lighter cartridge. Therefore, soldiers armed with the carbine can carry much more ammunition than those armed with a Thompson.

Categorizing the M1 Carbine series has been the subject of much debate. Although commonly compared to the later German StG 44 and Russian AK-47, the M1 and M2 Carbines are underpowered and outclassed. Instead, the carbine falls somewhere between the submachine gun and assault rifle and could be called a precursor of the personal defense weapon since it fulfilled a similar role.

One characteristic of .30 caliber Carbine ammunition is that from the beginning of production, non-corrosive primers were specified. This was the first major use of this type of primer in a military firearm. Because the rifle had a closed gas system, not normally disassembled in the field, corrosive primers would have led to a rapid deterioration of the function of the gas system. The use of non-corrosive primers was a novelty in service ammunition at this time. Some failures to fire were reported in early lots of .30 caliber Carbine ammunition, attributed to moisture ingress of the non-corrosive primer compound.

=== Sights, range and accuracy ===
The M1 Carbine entered service with a simple flip sight, which had two settings: 150 and 300 yd (140 and 270 m). However, field reports indicated that this sight was inadequate, and in 1944, it was replaced by a sliding ramp-type adjustable sight with four settings: 100 yd (91 m), 200 yd (180 m), 250 yd (230 m), and 300 yd (270 m). This new rear sight was also adjustable for windage.

At 100 yards (91 m), the M1 Carbine can deliver groups between 3 and 5 in (76 and 127 mm), sufficient for its intended purpose as a close-range defensive weapon. The M1 carbine has a maximum effective range of 330 yd (300 m); while the practical effective range is about 200 yd (180 m). According to Frank C. Barnes, effective range is limited to 150 yd (140 m) for sporting purposes.

=== Magazines ===
The M1 Carbine entered service with a standard straight 15-round box magazine. The introduction of the select-fire M2 Carbine in October of 1944 also brought into service the curved 30-round box magazine or "Banana Mag". After WWII, the 30-round magazine quickly became the standard magazine for both the M1 and M2 carbines, although the 15-round magazine remained in service until the end of the Vietnam War.

Perhaps the most common accessory used on the M1 carbine was a standard magazine belt pouch that was slid over the stock and held two extra 15-round magazines. This field adaptation was never officially approved, but proved an efficient method to supply extra ammunition in combat. After the introduction of the 30-round magazine, it was common for troops to tape two 30-round magazines together, a practice that became known as "jungle style". This led the military to introduce the "Holder, Magazine T3-A1" also called the "jungle clip", a metal clamp that held two magazines together without the need for tape.

The 30-round magazines introduced for use with the selective-fire M2 Carbine would not be reliably retained by the magazine catch made for the original M1 carbine which was designed to retain a 15-round magazine, so the much heavier 30-round magazine would not be properly seated in the M1 carbine magazine well. The loaded 30-round magazine would typically slant (impairing feed reliability) or even fall out, which contributed to the poor reliability record of the 30-round magazines. Because of their thin steel construction, they were also more prone to damage due to their added length and weight when loaded. In response to these issues, early production M1 Carbines had to be fitted with the type IV magazine catch used on the M2 carbine (and late production M1 carbines) if they were to be used with 30-round magazines in order to ensure reliable loading and feeding. The type IV magazine catch has a leg on the left side to correspond with the additional nub on the 30-round magazines.

Initial combat reports noted that the M1 Carbine's magazine release button was often mistaken for the safety button while under fire. When this occurred, pressing the magazine release caused the loaded magazine to drop, while the safety remained in the off position. As a result, the push-button safety was redesigned using a rotating lever.

=== Accessories ===
Originally the M1 Carbine did not have a bayonet lug, but personnel equipped with it were often issued with an M3 fighting knife. Due to requests from the field, the carbine was modified to incorporate a bayonet lug attached to the barrel band starting in 1945. However, very few carbines with bayonet lugs reached the front lines before the end of World War II. After the war, the bayonet lug was added to many M1 carbines during the arsenal refurbishing process. By the start of the Korean War, the bayonet lug-equipped M1 was standard issue. It is now rare to find an original M1 carbine without the bayonet lug. The M1 carbine mounts the M4 bayonet, which was based on the earlier M3 and formed the basis for the later M5, M6 and M7 bayonet-knives.

A folding-stock version of the carbine, the M1A1, was also developed after a request for a compact and light infantry arm for airborne troops. The Inland Division of General Motors manufactured 140,000 of them in two product runs in late 1942. They were originally issued to the 82nd and 101st airborne divisions but were later issued to all U.S. Army Airborne units and the U.S. Marine Corps. The folding-stock M1A1 is an unusual design in that the stock is not locked in the open or closed position, but is instead held in place by a spring-loaded cam.

As carbines were reconditioned, parts such as the magazine catch, rear sight, barrel band without bayonet lug, and stock were upgraded with current standard-issue parts. Also, both during and after World War II, many semi-automatic M1 carbines were converted to select-fire M2 carbines by using the T17 and T18 conversion kits. The conversion included a modified sear, slide, and trigger housing, and added a disconnector, disconnector lever, and selector switch that could be set for semi-auto or full-automatic fire.

During World War II, the T23 (M3) flash hider was designed to reduce the muzzle flash from the carbine, but was not introduced into service until the advent of the M3 carbine. With the exception of T23 hiders mounted on M3 carbines, few if any T23 flash-hider attachments saw service during the war, though unit armorers occasionally hand-built improvised compensator-flash-hiders of their own design.

Combat tests of the M2 Carbine resulted in an Army Ground Forces request that led to development of the T13 recoil check adopted September 1945.

The M1 Carbine was used with the M8 grenade launcher (see M7 grenade launcher), which was developed in early 1944. It was fired with the .30 caliber Carbine M6 grenade blank cartridge to launch 22 mm rifle grenades. However, the stress from firing rifle grenades could eventually crack the carbine's stock, and it also could not use the launcher with the M7 auxiliary "booster" charge to extend its range without breaking the stock. This made the M1 carbine with M8 grenade launcher a type of emergency-use weapon.

== Production ==
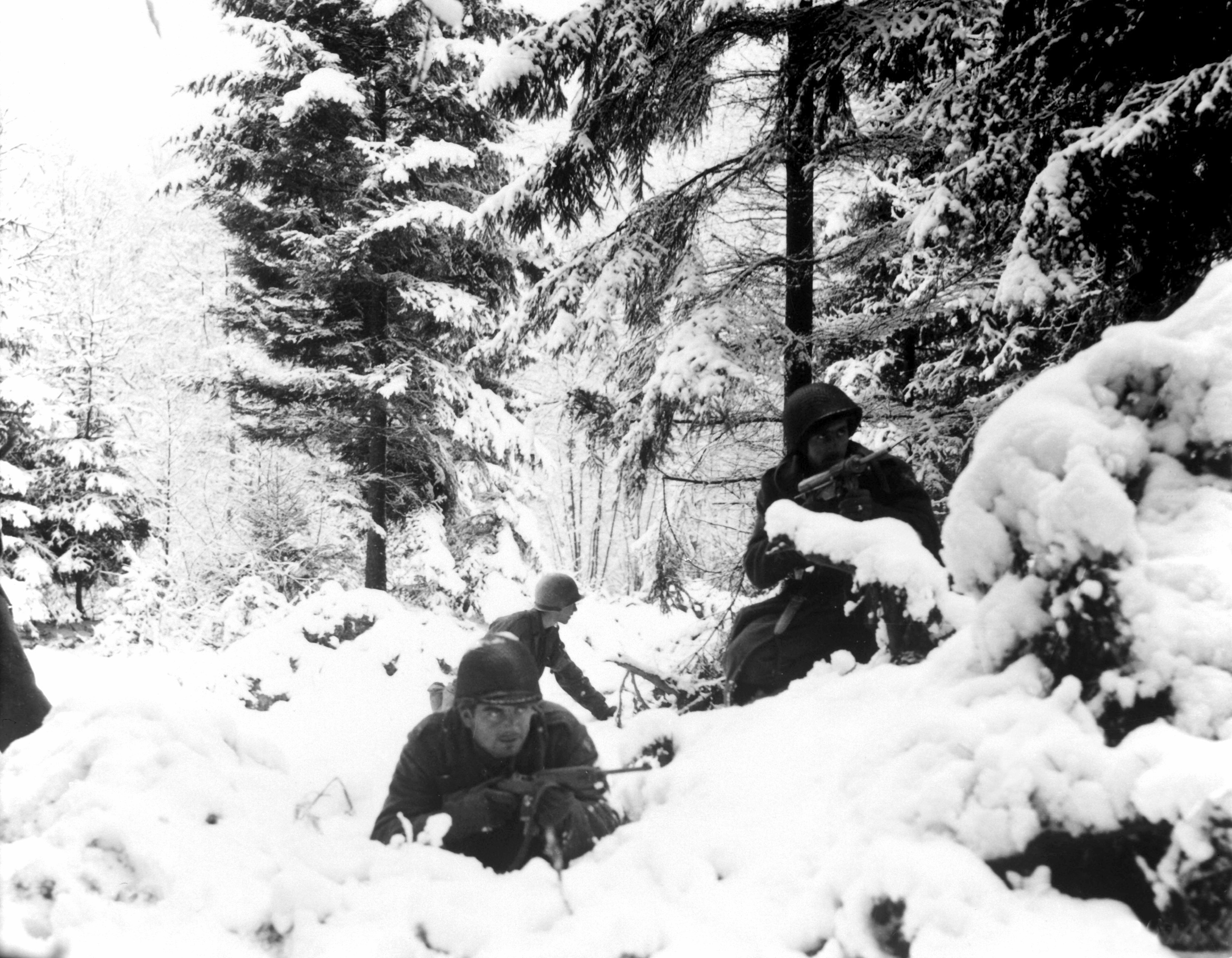
American infantrymen of the 290th Regiment fight in fresh snowfall near Amonines, Belgium. The soldier in the foreground is armed with an M1 Carbine.

A total of over 6.1 million M1 carbines of various models were manufactured, making it the most produced small arm for the American military during World War II (compared with about 5.4 million M1 rifles and about 1.3 million Thompson submachine guns). Despite being designed by Winchester, the great majority of these were made by other companies (see § Military contractors below). The largest producer was the Inland division of General Motors, but many others were made by contractors as diverse as IBM, the Underwood Typewriter Company, and Rock-Ola Manufacturing Corporation. Few contractors made all the parts for carbines bearing their names: some makers bought parts from other major contractors or sub-contracted minor parts to companies like Marlin Firearms or Auto-Ordnance. Parts by all makers were required to be interchangeable. Often one company would get ahead or behind in production and parts would be shipped from one company to the other to help them catch up on their quota. When receivers were shipped for this purpose, the manufacturers would often mark them for both companies. Some of the strangest combinations were the M1s made by the combined efforts of Underwood and Quality Hardware, resulting in the manufacturer mark "Un-quality". The receiver was subcontracted from Union Switch and Signal, not Underwood. Many carbines were refurbished at several arsenals after the war, with many parts interchanged from original maker carbines. True untouched war production carbines, therefore, are the most desirable for collectors.

The M1 carbine was also one of the most cost-effective weapons used by the United States military during World War II. At the beginning of World War II, the average production cost for an M1 carbine was approximately $45, about half the cost of an M1 rifle at approximately $85 and about a fifth of the cost of a Thompson submachine gun at approximately $225. The .30 caliber Carbine ammunition was also far cheaper to produce than the standard .30-06 ammunition; used fewer resources, was smaller, lighter and easier to make. These were major factors in the United States military decision to adopt the M1 carbine, especially when considering the vast numbers of weapons and ammunition manufactured and transported by the United States during World War II.

== U.S. combat use ==
=== World War II ===
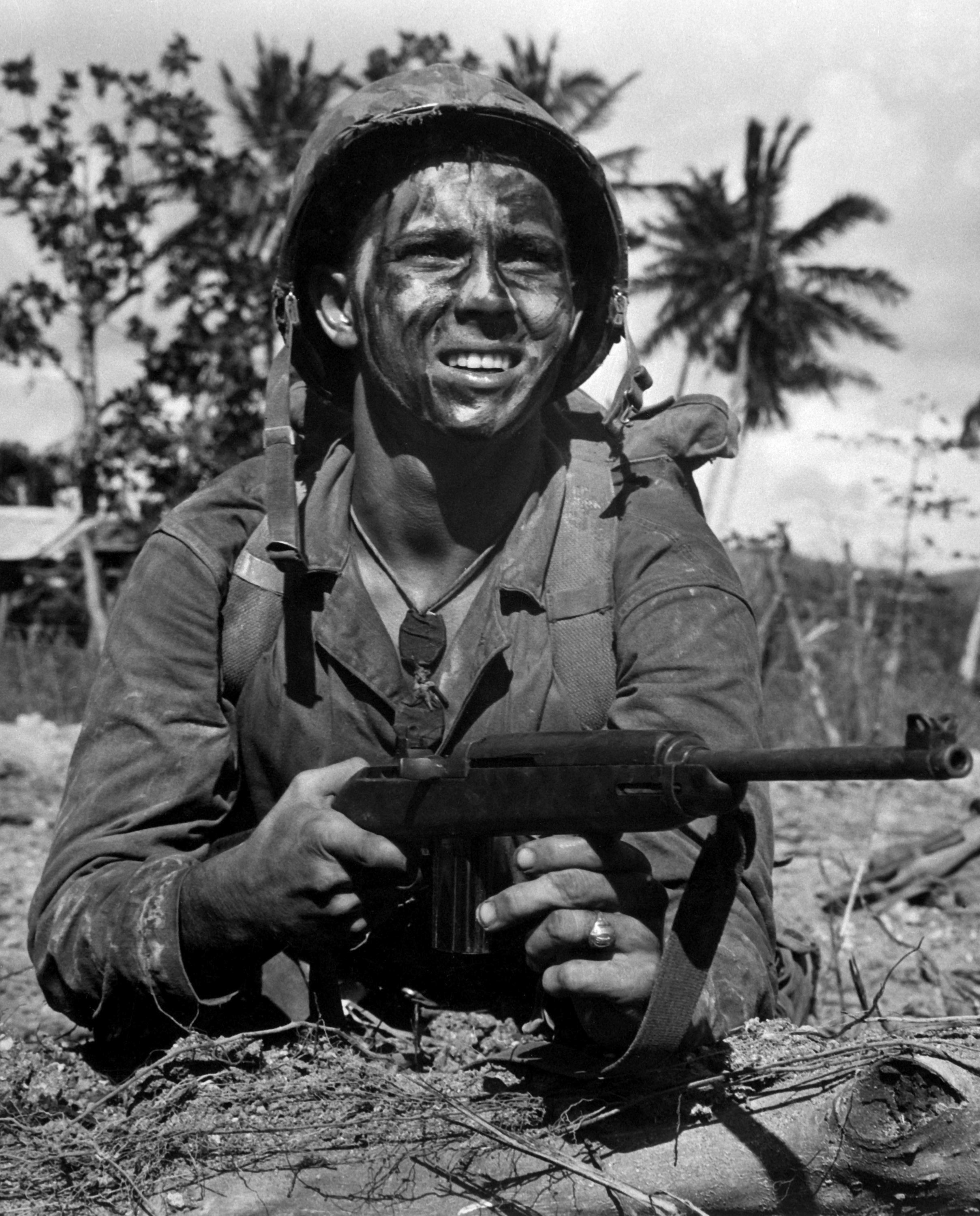
U.S. Marine in combat at Guam

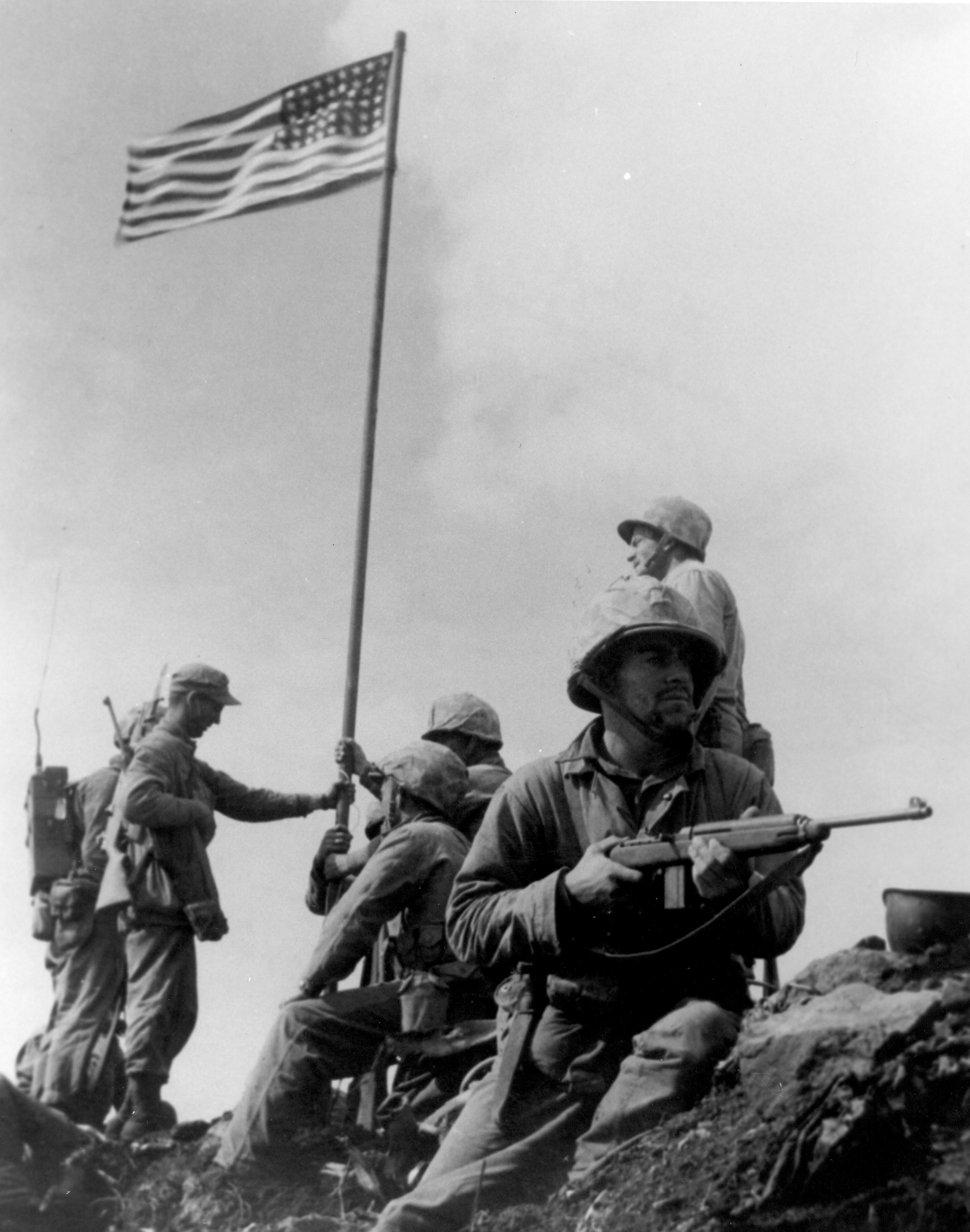
M1 carbine at first Iwo Jima flag raising

The M1 carbine with its reduced-power .30 cartridge was not originally intended to serve as a primary weapon for combat infantrymen, nor was it comparable to more powerful assault rifles developed late in the war. However, it was markedly superior to the .45 caliber submachine guns in use at the time in both accuracy and penetration, and its lighter .30 caliber cartridge allowed soldiers to carry more ammunition. As a result, the carbine was soon widely issued to infantry officers, American paratroopers, non-commissioned officers, ammunition bearers, forward artillery observers, and other frontline troops. The first M1 carbines were delivered in mid-1942, with initial priority given to troops in the European Theater of Operations (ETO).

During World War II a standard U.S. Army infantry company was issued a total of 28 M1 carbines. The company headquarters was issued nine carbines (for the company commander, executive officer, first sergeant, mess sergeant, supply sergeant, bugler, and three messengers), the weapons platoon was issued sixteen carbines (for the platoon leader, platoon sergeant, two platoon messengers in the platoon headquarters, one messenger in each of the two mortar and machine gun section headquarters, and ten for the mortar and machine gun ammunition bearers), and the three rifle platoons were issued one each (for the platoon leader).

The M1 carbine gained generally high praise for its small size, light weight and firepower, especially by those troops who were unable to use a full-size rifle as their primary weapon. However, its reputation in front-line combat was mixed and negative reports began to surface with airborne operations in Sicily in 1943, and increased during the fall and winter of 1944.

In the Asiatic-Pacific Theater, soldiers and guerrilla forces operating in heavy jungle with only occasional enemy contact praised the carbine for its small size, light weight, and firepower. However, soldiers and marines engaged in frequent daily firefights (particularly those serving in the Philippines) found the weapon to have insufficient penetration and stopping power. While carbine bullets would easily penetrate the front and back of steel helmets, as well as the body armor used by Japanese forces of the era, reports of the carbine's failure to stop enemy soldiers, sometimes after multiple hits, appeared in individual after-action reports, postwar evaluations, and service histories of both the U.S. Army and the U.S. Marine Corps.

The carbine's exclusive use of non-corrosive-primer ammunition was found to be ideal by troops and ordnance personnel serving in the Pacific, where barrel corrosion was a significant issue with the corrosive primers used in .30-06 caliber weapons. However, in the European theatre, some soldiers reported misfires attributed to moisture ingress of the non-corrosive primer compound.

==== Selective-fire version ====
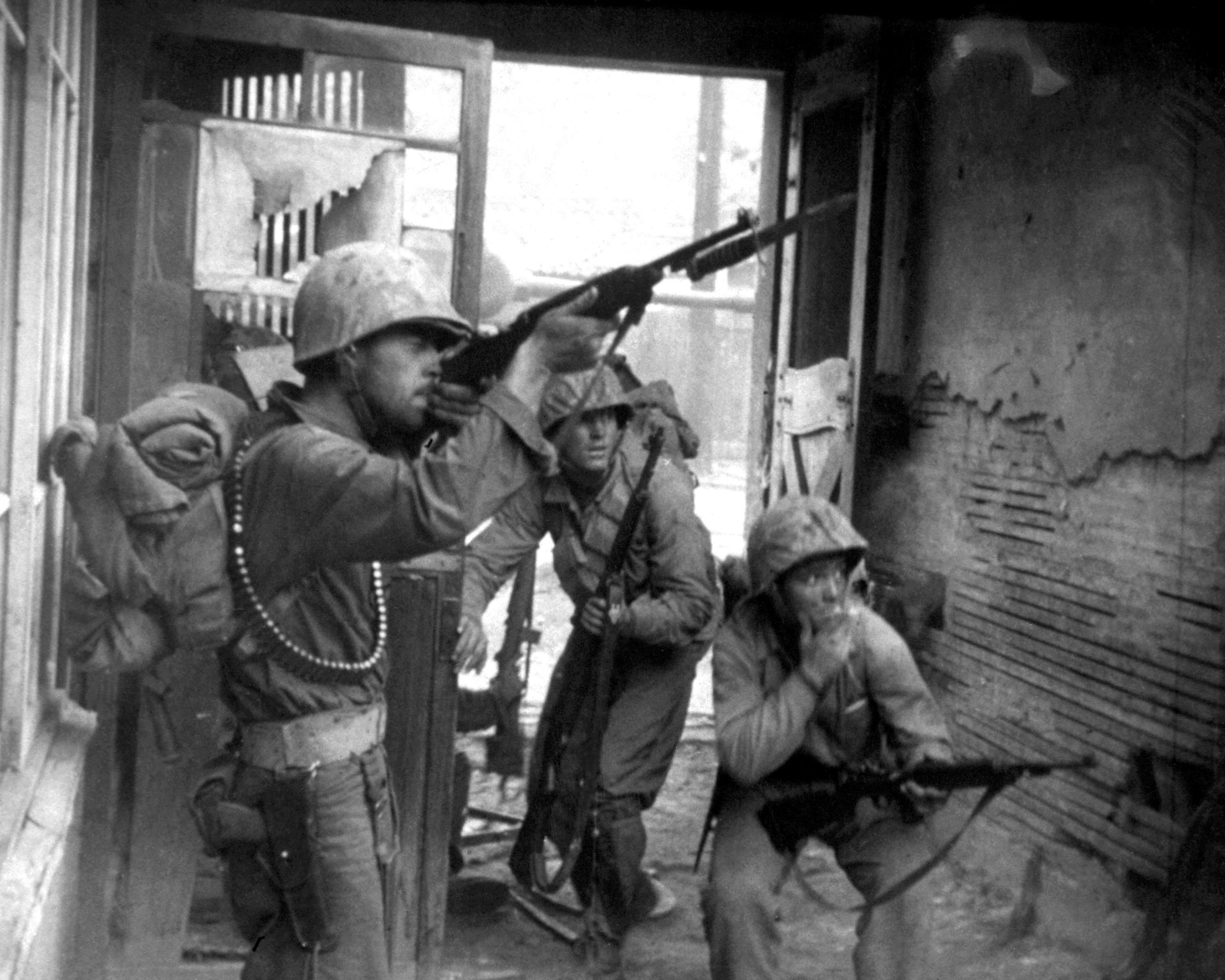
U.S. Marines fighting in the streets of Seoul, South Korea, 20 September 1950. The M1 carbine in the foreground has a bayonet mounted.

Initially, the M1 carbine was intended to have a select-fire capability, but the requirement for rapid production of the new carbine resulted in the omission of this feature from the Light Rifle Program. On 26 October 1944, in response to the Germans' widespread use of automatic weapons, especially the Sturmgewehr 44 assault rifle, the select-fire M2 carbine was introduced, along with a new 30-round magazine. The M2 had a fully automatic rate-of-fire of 750-775 rounds-per-minute. Although actual M2 production began late in the war (April 1945), U.S. Ordnance issued conversion-part kits to allow field conversion of semi-auto M1 carbines to the selective-fire M2 configuration. These converted M1/M2 select-fire carbines saw limited combat service in Europe, primarily during the final Allied advance into Germany. In the Pacific, both converted and original M2 carbines saw limited use in the last days of the fighting in the Philippines.

==== Infrared sight versions ====
The M3 carbine was an M2 carbine with the M2 infrared night sight or sniperscope. The M3 did not have iron sights. It was first used in combat by Army units during the invasion of Okinawa, where about 150 M3 carbines were used. For the first time, U.S. soldiers had a weapon that allowed them to visually detect Japanese infiltrating into American lines at night, even during complete darkness. A team of two or three soldiers was used to operate the weapon and provide support. At night, the scope would be used to detect Japanese patrols and assault units moving forward. At that point, the operator would fire a burst of automatic fire at the greenish images of enemy soldiers. The M3 carbine had an effective range of about 70 yards (64 meters), limited by the visual capabilities of the sight. Fog and rain further reduced the weapon's effective range. However, it is estimated that 30% of Japanese casualties inflicted by rifle and carbine fire during the Okinawan campaign were caused by the M3 carbine.

The system was refined over time, and by the Korean War the improved M3 infrared night sight was in service. The M3 sight has a longer effective range than its predecessor, about 125 yards (114 meters). However, it still required the user to carry a heavy backpack-mounted battery pack to power the scope and infrared light. They were used primarily in static defensive positions in Korea to locate troops attempting to infiltrate in darkness. M3 operators would not only use their carbines to dispatch individual targets, but also used tracer ammo to identify troop concentrations for machine gunners to decimate. In total, about 20,000 sets were made before they became obsolete, and were given to the public as surplus.

=== Korean War ===
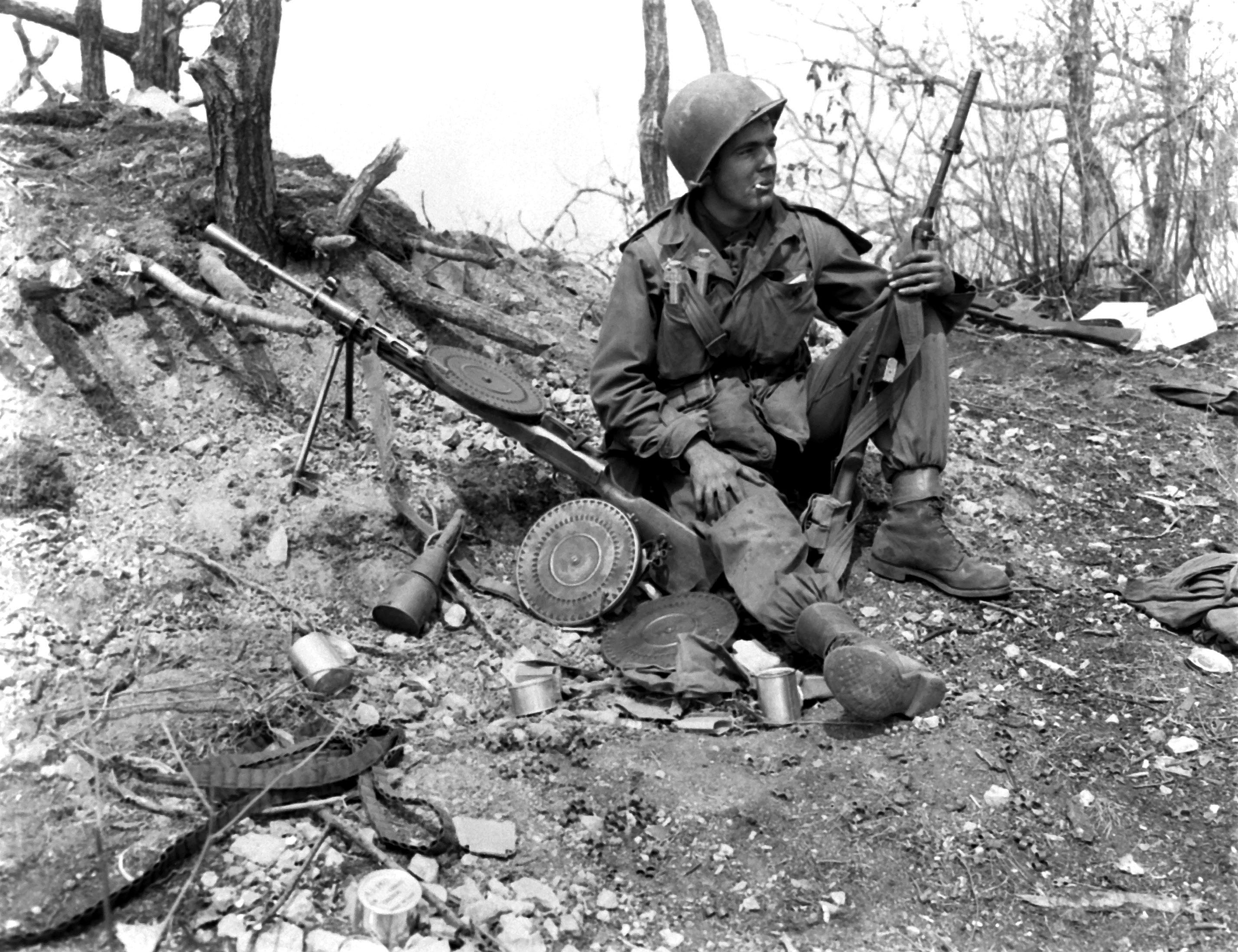
M1 carbine in action during Korean War with 30-round magazine, stock pouch for two 15-round magazines, and grenade launcher near a captured Soviet DP-27 machine gun

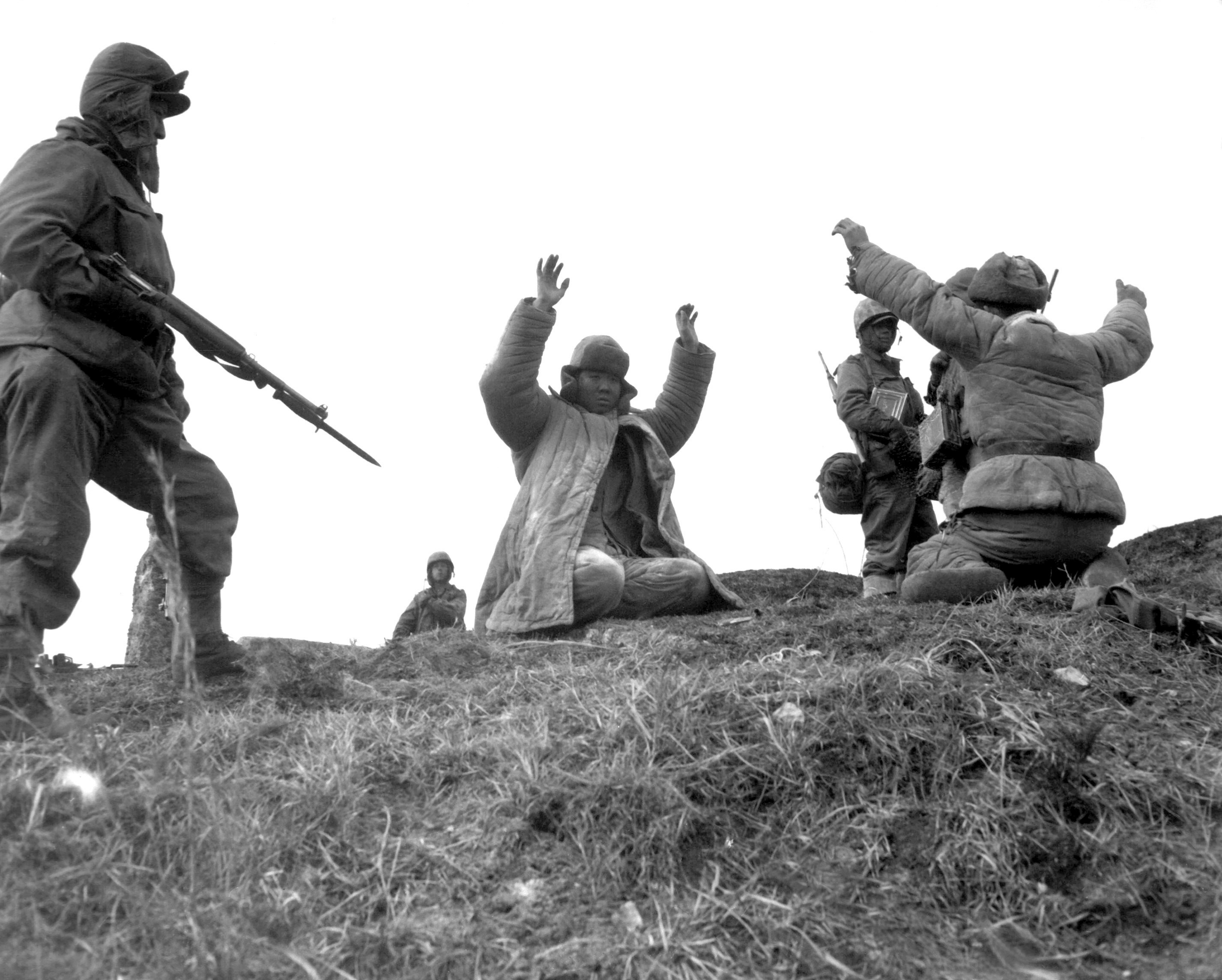
U.S. Marines with M1 carbine with mounted bayonet holding captured Chinese soldiers during fighting on the central Korean front

By the Korean War, the select fire M2 carbine had largely replaced the submachine gun in U.S. service and was the most widely used carbine variant. However, the semi-auto M1 carbine was also widely used- especially by support troops. However, in Korea, all versions of the carbine soon acquired a widespread reputation for jamming in extremely cold weather, this being eventually traced to weak return springs, freezing of parts due to overly viscous lubricants and inadequate cartridge recoil impulse as the result of subzero temperatures.

There were also many complaints from individual soldiers that the carbine bullets failed to stop heavily clothed or gear-laden North Korean and Chinese (PVA) troops even at close range and after multiple hits. Marines of the 1st Marine Division also reported instances of carbine bullets failing to stop enemy soldiers, and some units issued standing orders for carbine users to aim for the head. PVA infantry forces who had been issued captured U.S. small arms disliked the carbine for the same reason.

A 1951 official U.S. Army evaluation reported that ..."There are practically no data bearing on the accuracy of the carbine at ranges in excess of 50 yd (46 m). The record contains a few examples of carbine-aimed fire felling an enemy soldier at this distance or perhaps a little more. But they are so few in number that no general conclusion can be drawn from them. Where carbine fire had proved killing effect, approximately 95 percent of the time the target was dropped at less than 50 yd (46 m)." The evaluation also reported that ..."Commanders noted that it took two to three engagements at least to settle their men to the automatic feature of the carbine so that they would not greatly waste ammunition under the first impulse of engagement. By experience, they would come to handle it semi-automatically, but it took prolonged battle hardening to bring about this adjustment in the human equation."

Despite its mixed reputation, the M2 carbine's firepower often made it the weapon of choice, when it came to night patrols in Korea. The M3 carbine with its infrared sniper scope was also used against night infiltrators, especially during the static stages of the conflict.

=== Vietnam War ===
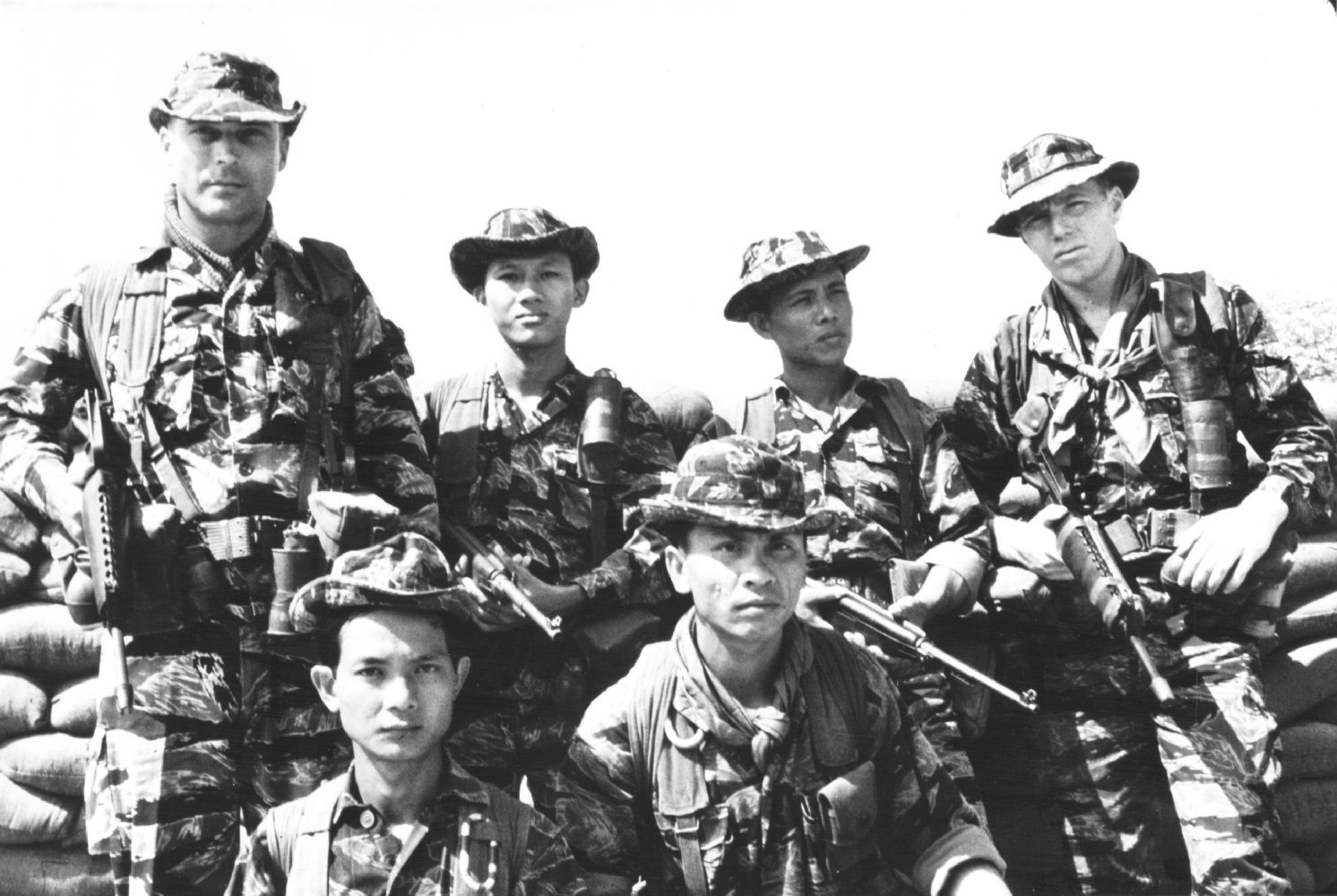
ARVN soldiers with M1 carbines and U.S. Special Forces with M16s

The M1 and M2 carbines issued to U.S. forces were first given to American military advisors in Vietnam beginning in 1956, and later, the United States Air Force Security Police and United States Army Special Forces. By the war's end, it was estimated that a total of 1.5 million M1 and M2 carbines were left in Vietnam.

At least 793,994 M1 and M2 carbines were given to the South Vietnamese and were widely used throughout the Vietnam War. A number were captured during the war by Viet Cong, with some made compact by shortening the barrel and/or stock. "While the carbine's lighter weight and high rate of fire made it an excellent weapon for small-statured Asians, these guns lacked sufficient hitting power and penetration, and they were eventually outclassed by the AK-47 assault rifle." The M1/M2/M3 carbines were the most heavily produced family of U.S. military weapons for several decades. They were used by every branch of the U.S. Armed Forces.

== Foreign usage ==
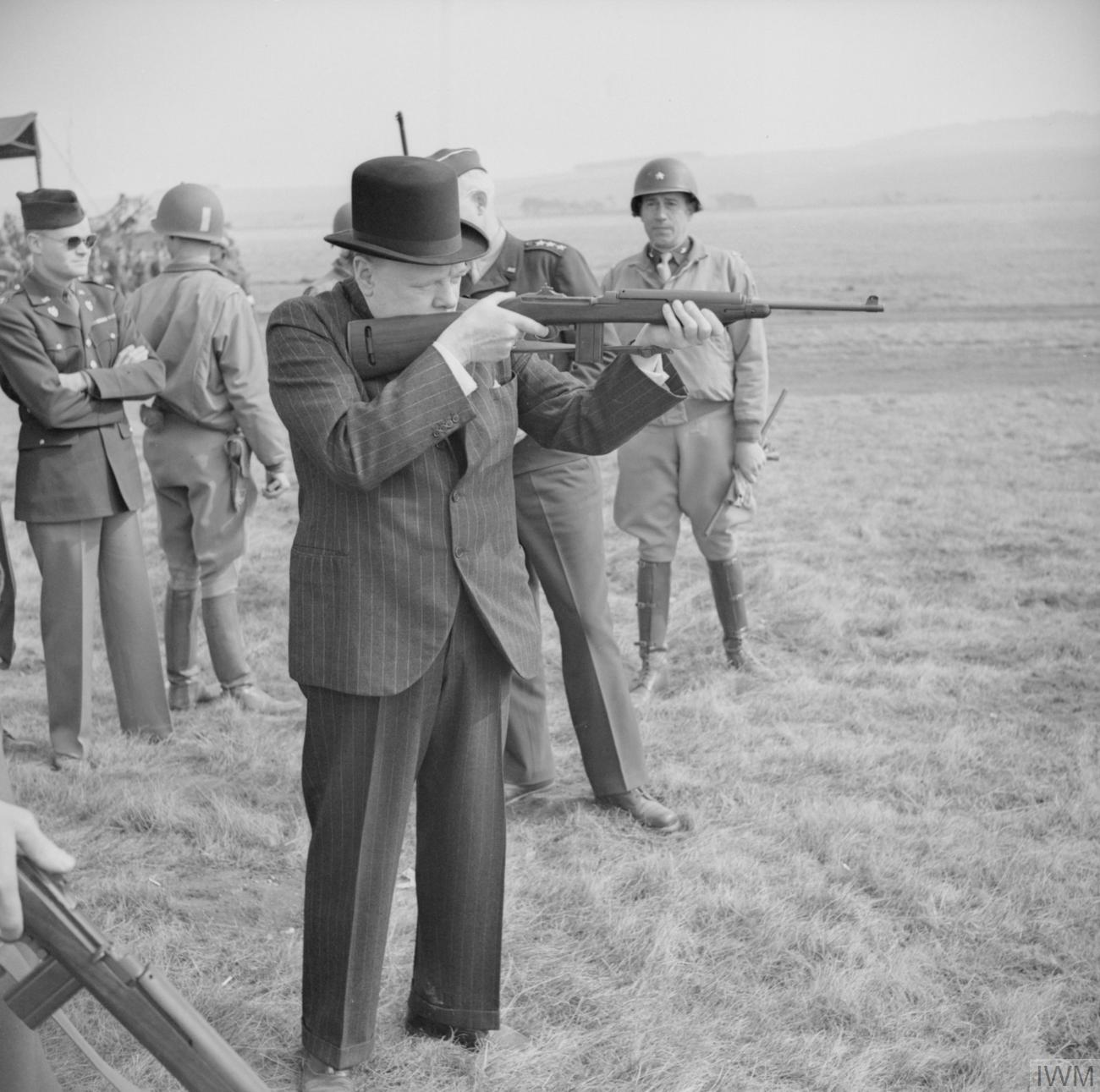
Winston Churchill fires an American M1 carbine during a visit to the U.S. 2nd Armored Division on Salisbury Plain, 23 March 1944.

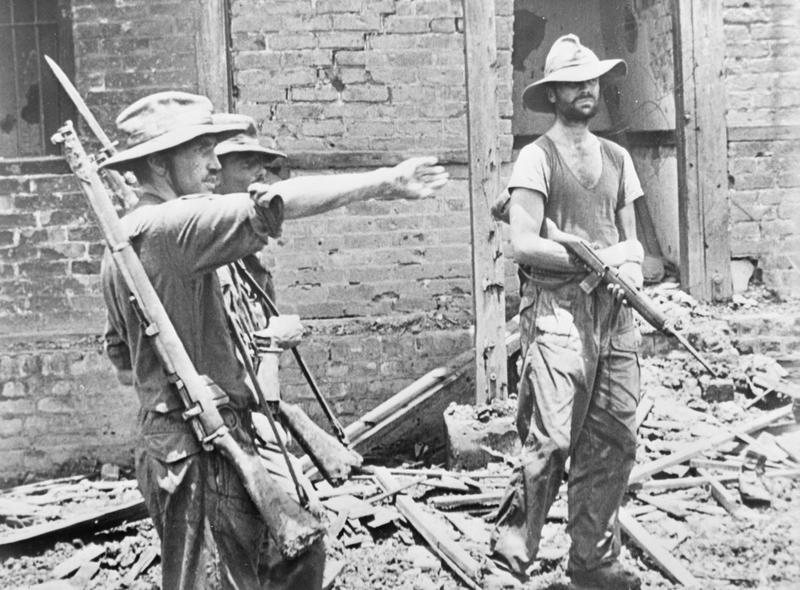
British officers: Brigadier "Mad" Mike Calvert (left) gives orders to Lieutenant-Colonel Shaw, while Major James Lumley stands with M1 carbine under his arm, after the capture of Mogaung in Burma during the second Chindit expedition, June 1944.

After World War II, the M1 and M2 carbines were widely exported to U.S. allies and client states (1,015,568 to South Korea, 793,994 to South Vietnam, 269,644 to France, etc.), they were used as a frontline weapon well into the Vietnam War era, and they continue to be used by military, police, and security forces around the world to this day.

=== British Army ===
During World War II, the British SAS used the M1 and M1A1 carbines after 1943. The weapon was taken into use simply because a decision had been taken by Allied authorities to supply .30 caliber weapons from U.S. stocks in the weapons containers dropped to Resistance groups sponsored by an SOE, or later also Office of Strategic Services (OSS), organizer, on the assumption the groups so supplied would be operating in areas within the operational boundaries of U.S. forces committed to Operation Overlord. They were found to be suited to the kind of operation the two British, two French, and one Belgian Regiment carried out. It was handy enough to parachute with, and, in addition, could be easily stowed in an operational Jeep. Other specialist intelligence collection units, such as 30 Assault Unit sponsored by the Naval Intelligence Division of the British Admiralty, which operated across the entire Allied area of operations, also made use of this weapon. The carbine continued to be utilized as late as the Malayan Emergency, by the Police Field Force of the Royal Malaysian Police, along with other units of the British Army, were issued the M2 carbine for both jungle patrols and outpost defense. The Royal Ulster Constabulary also used the M1 carbine.

=== German Army ===
Small numbers of captured M1 carbines were used by German forces in World War II, particularly after D-Day. The German designation for captured carbines was Selbstladekarabiner 455(a). The "a" came from the country name in German; in this case, Amerika. It was also used by German police and border guards in Bavaria after World War II and into the 1950s. The carbines were stamped according to the branch they were in service with; for instance, those used by the border guard were stamped "Bundesgrenzschutz". Some of these weapons were modified with different sights, finishes, and sometimes new barrels.

=== Japanese GSDF ===
A variant was produced shortly after World War II by Japanese manufacturer Howa Machinery, under U.S. supervision. These were issued to all branches of the Japan Self-Defense Forces, and large numbers of them found their way to Southeast Asia during the Vietnam War. Howa also made replacement parts for US-made M1 carbines issued to Japanese police and military.

=== Israel Defense Forces ===
The M1 carbine was also used by the Israeli Palmach-based special forces in the 1948 Arab–Israeli War. And, because of their compact size and semi-automatic capabilities, they continued to be used by Israeli Defence Forces after the creation of Israel. The Israeli police still use the M1 carbine as a standard long gun for non-combat elements and Mash'az volunteers.

=== French Army ===
The U.S. provided France with 269,644 M1 and M2 carbines from World War II to 1963. The carbines were used by the French Paratroopers and Legionnaires, as well as specialists (e.g., drivers, radio operators, engineers), during the First Indochina War, the Algerian War and the Suez Crisis.

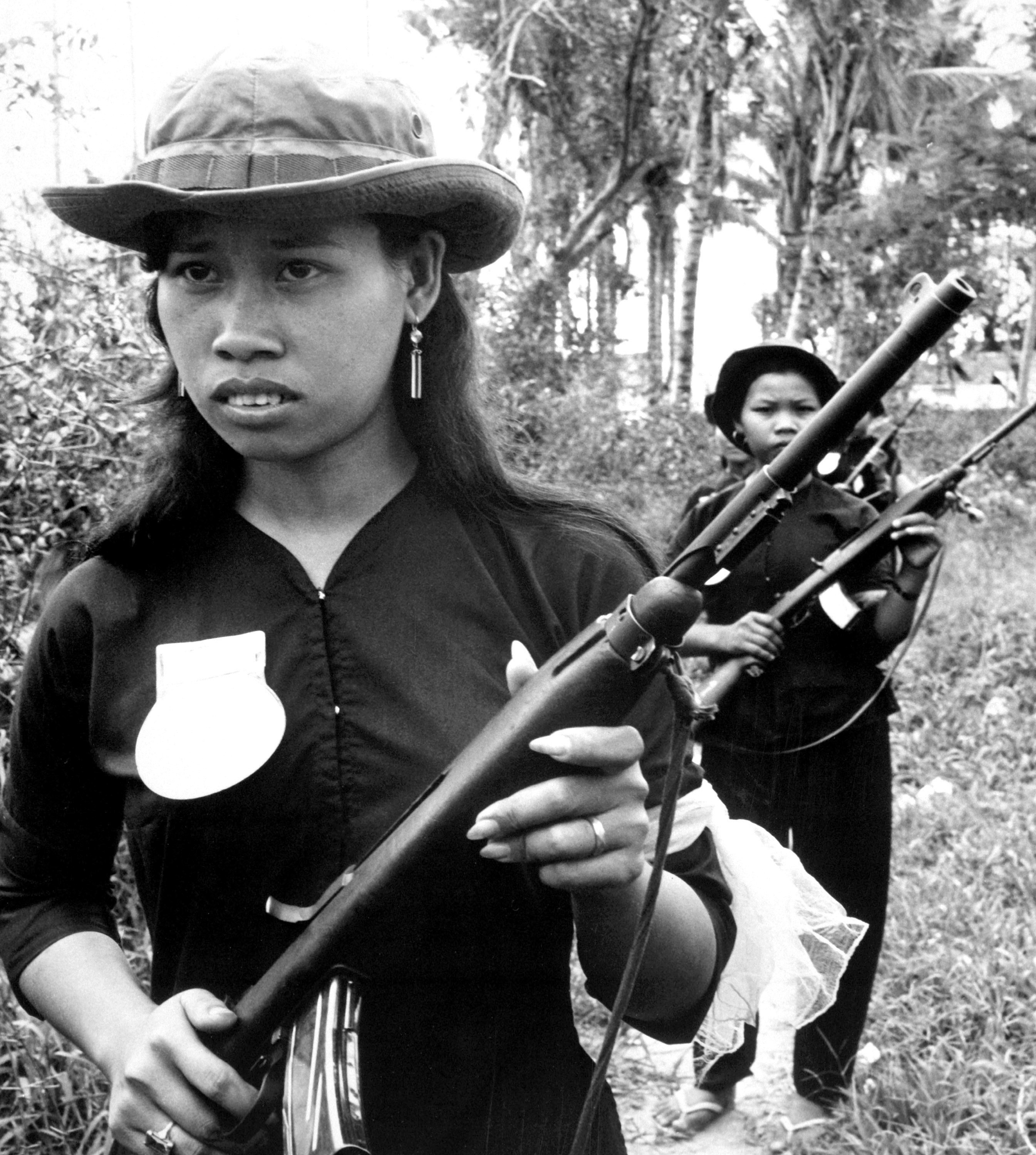
South Vietnamese Popular Force members on patrol with M1 carbines

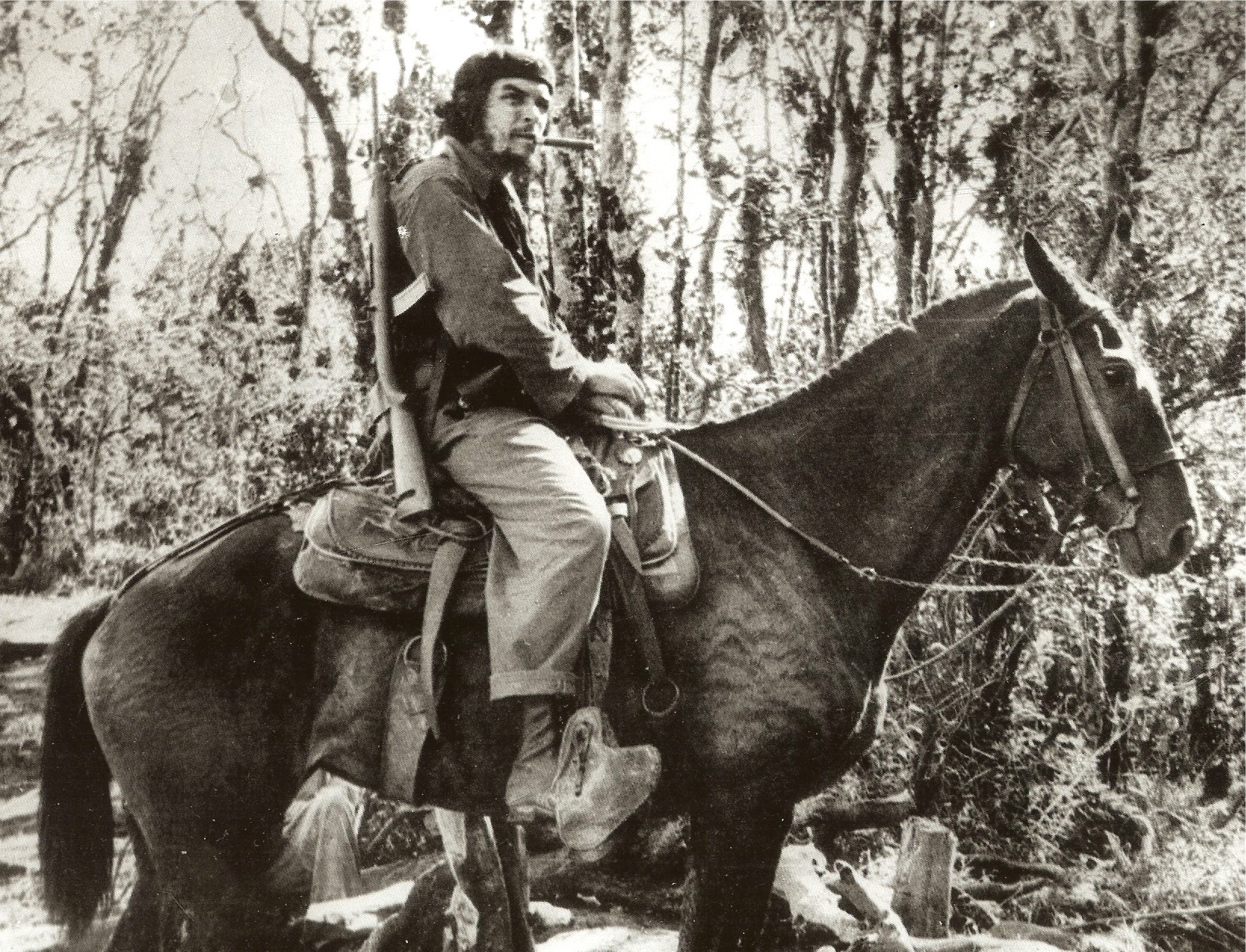
Che Guevara atop a mule in Las Villas province, Cuba, in November 1958, with an M2 Carbine

=== South Vietnam ===
The U.S. provided the Army of the Republic of Vietnam with 793,994 M1 and M2 carbines from 1963 to 1973. Along with tens of thousands of carbines left behind by the French after the First Indochina War, the M1 and M2 carbines were the most widely issued small arm during the early stages in the Vietnam War and remained in service in large numbers until the fall of Saigon. The South Vietnamese would also receive 220,300 M1 Garands and 520 M1C/M1D rifles, and 640,000 M16 rifles.

The Viet Minh and the Viet Cong also used large numbers of M1 and M2 carbines, captured from the French, ARVN and local militia forces of South Vietnam, as well as receiving many thousands of carbines from the North Vietnamese Army (NVA), China and North Korea. Over time, the SKS and eventually the AK-47 would replace the carbine to become the dominant weapons used by the Viet Cong.

=== South Korea ===
The Republic of Korea Armed Forces received 1,015,568 M1 and M2 carbines from 1963 to 1972. Along with hundreds of thousands of Carbines and M1 Garands provided by the United States Army before, during and shortly after the Korean War, South Korea would become the largest single recipient of American M1 and M2 carbines.

The Republic of Korea Armed Forces in Vietnam used M1 and M2 carbines in the early years of participation of the Vietnam War until the forces received the M16 rifle from the United States.

=== Philippines ===
The government of the Philippines still issues M1 carbines to the infantrymen of the Philippine Army's 2nd Infantry Division assigned in Luzon Island (some units are issued just M14 automatic rifles and M1 carbines) and the Civilian Auxiliary Forces Geographical Unit (CAFGU) and Civilian Volunteer Organizations (CVO) spread throughout the Philippines. Certain provincial police units of the Philippine National Police (PNP) still use government-issued M1 carbines as well as some operating units of the National Bureau of Investigation (NBI). In many provinces in the Philippines, M1 carbines are still a highly valued light small arm. Elements of the New People's Army and Islamic secessionist movements value the carbine as a lightweight weapon and preferred choice for mountain and ambush operations.

The M1 carbine has become one of the most recognized firearms in Philippine society, with the Marikina-based company ARMSCOR Philippines still continues to manufacture .30 caliber ammunition for the Philippine market.

=== Latin America ===
The M1 and M2 carbines were widely used by military, police, and security forces and their opponents during the many guerrilla and civil wars throughout Latin America until the 1990s, when they were mostly replaced by more modern designs. A notable user was Che Guevara who used them during the Cuban Revolution and in Bolivia where he was executed by a Bolivian soldier armed with an M2 carbine. Guevara's fellow revolutionary Camilo Cienfuegos also used an M2 carbine that he modified with the pistol grip and foregrip from a Thompson submachine gun. Cienfuegos' carbine is on display in the Museum of the Revolution (Cuba).

In Rio de Janeiro, Brazil, a police battalion named Batalhão de Operações Policiais Especiais (BOPE, or "Special Police Operations Battalion") still uses the M1 carbine.

== Variants ==
The standard-issue versions of the carbine officially listed and supported were the M1, M1A1, M2 and M3.

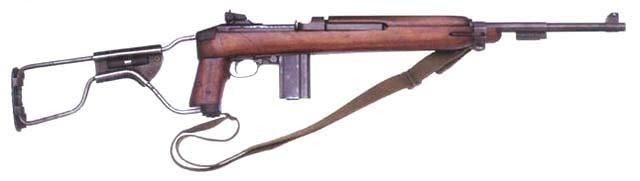
M1A1 carbine paratrooper model with folding buttstock and late issue adjustable sight and bayonet lug

=== Carbine, Cal .30, M1A1 ===
- Side-folding stock, 15-round box magazine
- Paratrooper model
- About 150,000 produced

The M1A1 was designed in May 1942 for paratrooper units, and came with a folding stock, but was otherwise identical to a standard M1. M1A1 carbines were made by Inland, a division of General Motors and originally came with the early "L" nonadjustable sight and barrel band without bayonet lug. Inland production of M1A1 carbines was interspersed with Inland production of M1 carbines with the standard stock. Stocks were often swapped out as carbines were refurbished at arsenals.

=== Carbine, Cal .30, M1A2 ===
- Proposed variant with improved sight adjustable for windage and elevation
- Produced only as an "overstamped" model (an arsenal-refurbished M1 with new rear sight and other late M1 improvements)

=== Carbine, Cal .30, M1A3 ===
- Underside-folding pantograph stock, 15-round magazine
- Type standardized to replace the M1A1 but may not have been issued
- Pantograph stock was more rigid than the M1A1's folding stock and folded flush under the fore end. A more common name for this type of stock is an "underfolder".

=== Carbine, Cal .30, M2 ===
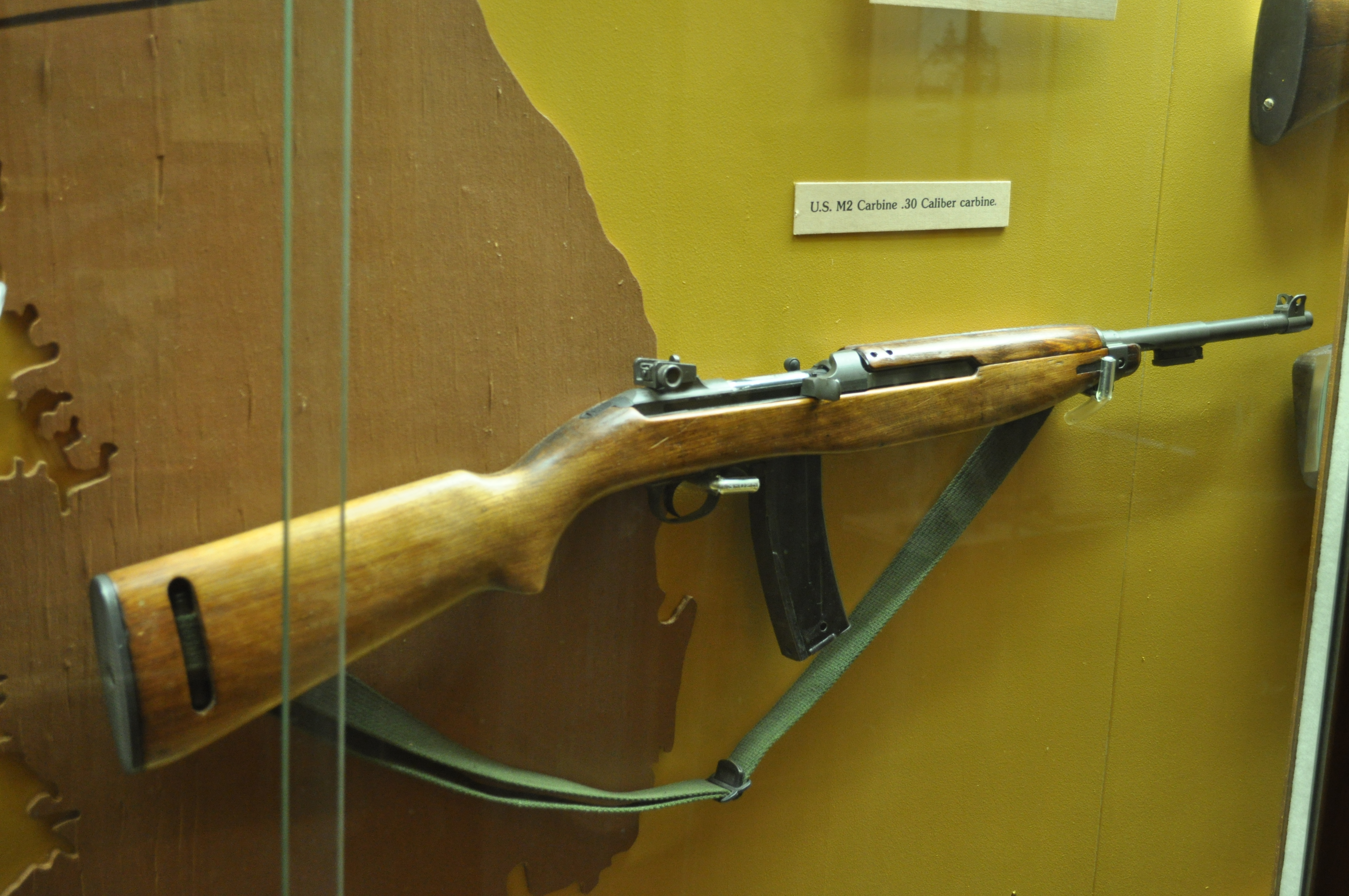
M2 carbine with the selector lever on the left side, opposite the bolt handle

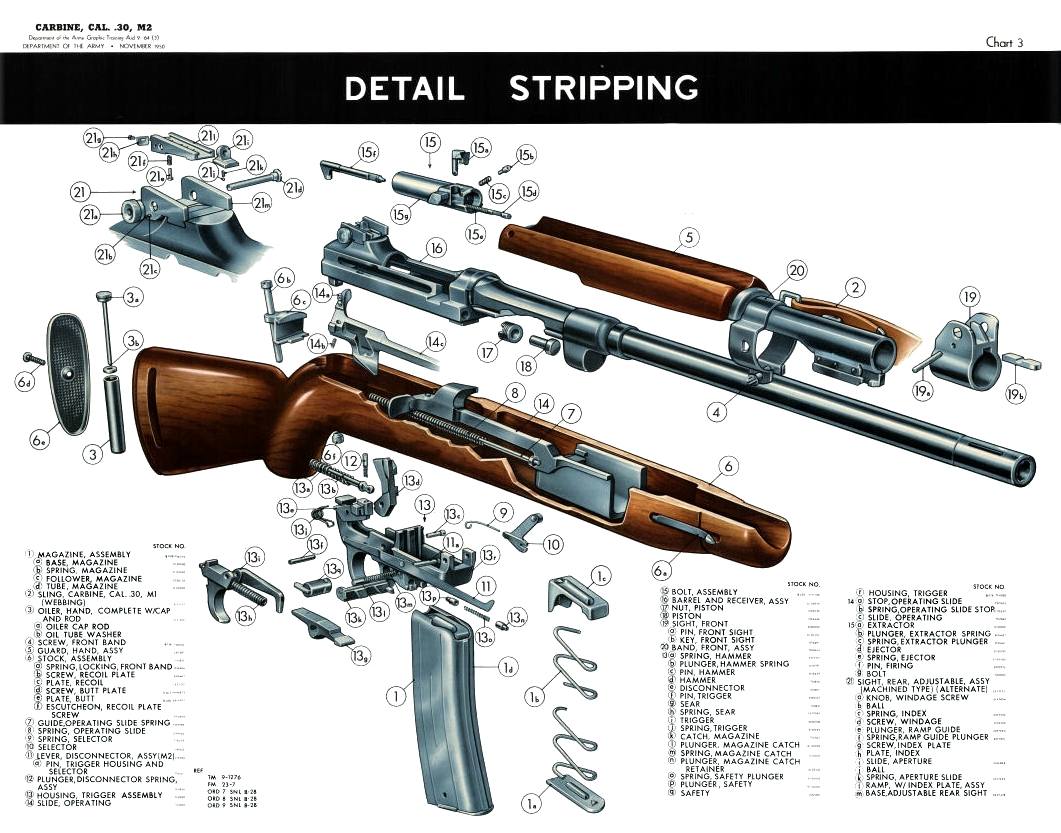
Exploded view of the M2 carbine

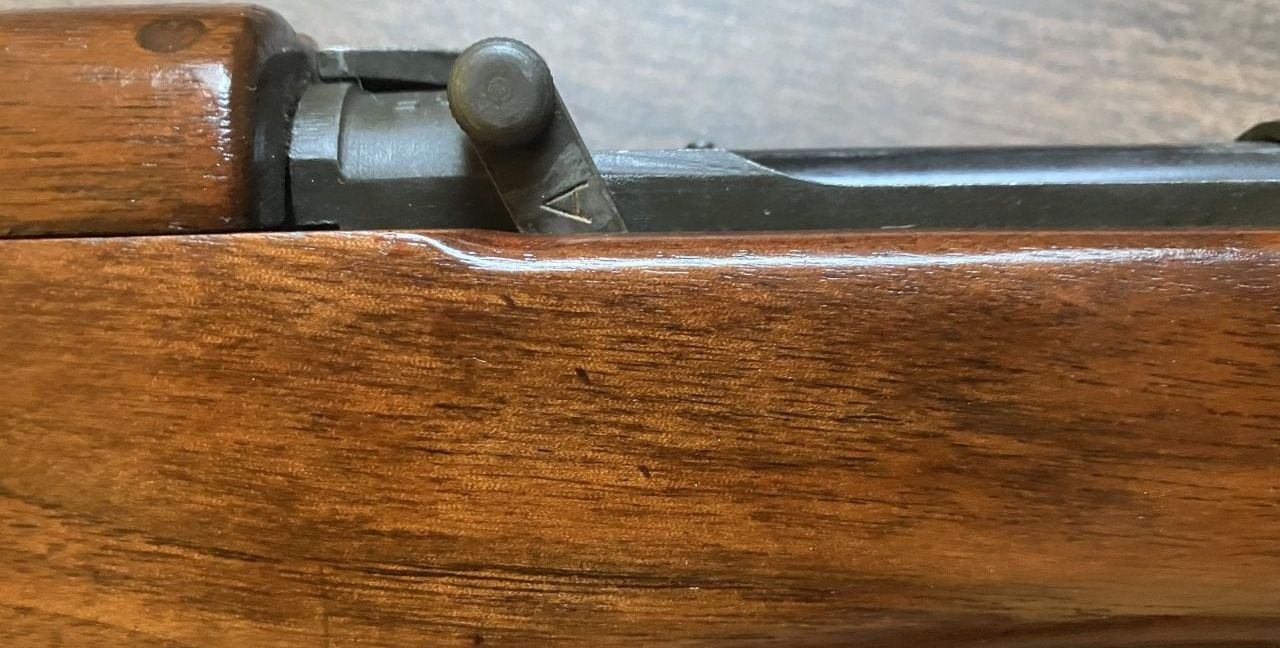
Close up of M2 carbine selector switch

- Mid to late 1944
- Selective fire (capable of semi-automatic or fully automatic fire)
- 15-round magazine or 30-round magazine
- About 600,000 produced

Initially, the M1 carbine was intended to have a selective-fire capability, but the decision was made to put the M1 into production without this feature. Fully automatic capability was incorporated into the design of the M2 (an improved, selective-fire version of the M1), introduced in 1944. The M2 featured the late M1 improvements to the rear sight, addition of a bayonet lug, and other minor changes.

Research into a conversion kit for selective fire began May 1944; the first kit was developed by Inland engineers, and known as the T4. Inland was awarded a contract for 500 T4 carbines in September 1944. Although the conversion was seen as satisfactory, the heavier 30-round magazine put greater strain on the magazine catch, necessitating the development of a sturdier catch. The slide, sear, and stock design also had to be modified. On fully automatic fire, the T4 model could fire about 750 rounds per minute, and generated a manageable recoil.

Although some carbines were marked at the factory as M2, the only significant difference between an M1 and M2 carbine is in the fire control group. The military issued field conversion kits (T17 and T18) to convert an M1 to an M2. Legally a carbine marked M2 is always a machine gun for national firearms registry purposes.

These M2 parts including the heavier M2 stock were standardized for arsenal rebuild of M1 and M1A1 carbines.

A modified round bolt replaced the original flat top bolt to save machining steps in manufacture. Many sources erroneously refer to this round bolt as an "M2 bolt" but it was developed as a standard part for new manufacture M1 and later M2 carbines and as a replacement part, with priority given to use on M1A1 and M2 carbines. The slightly heavier round bolt did moderate the cyclic rate of the M2 on full automatic.

Despite being in demand, very few M2 carbines saw use during World War II, and then mostly in the closing days against Japan. The M2 carbine was logistically compatible with the millions of M1 carbines in U.S. service, and offered longer range, better accuracy and better penetration than (pistol caliber) submachine guns like the M1 Thompsons and M3 Grease Guns. Therefore, after World War II, the M2 carbine largely replaced the submachine guns in U.S. service, until it was itself replaced by the M16 rifle.

The M2 model was the most widely used carbine variant during the Korean War. A detailed study of the effectiveness of the M2 in the war was assembled by S. L. A. Marshall. He found that many troops complained on the lack of effective range of the gun, which allowed the enemy to get close enough to throw hand grenades. A more detailed analysis showed however that most troops who complained actually tended to run low on ammo, because they fired their M2 on fully automatic too soon. Troops who fired their guns on semi-automatic at distance generally complained less about the M2's effectiveness. Generally, the more seasoned troops used the latter approach. The carbine was usually given to second line troops (administrative, support, etc.), who had little combat experience and also did not have much training in small-unit tactics, but who usually had to engage the enemy at some critical moment, like a breakthrough or ambush. Marshall noted that almost all killing shots with carbines in Korea were at ranges of 50 yd (46 m) or less. The M2 was a preferred weapon for night patrols. The M2 was also used in the early stages of the Vietnam War by special forces, ARVN advisers, and air crews.

Contemporary authors have struggled to categorize the M2 carbine. While it did introduce select-fire capability and an intermediate cartridge, its stopping power and weight was far below that of the StG 44. As such, it is considered by some to be an early predecessor to the assault rifle or personal defense weapon.

=== Carbine, Cal .30, M2A1 ===
- M2 with an M1A1 folding stock. Like the M1A1, it was made for paratroopers.

=== Carbine, Cal .30, M2A2 ===
- Arsenal-refurbished (over stamped M2) model

=== Carbine, Cal .30, M3 ===
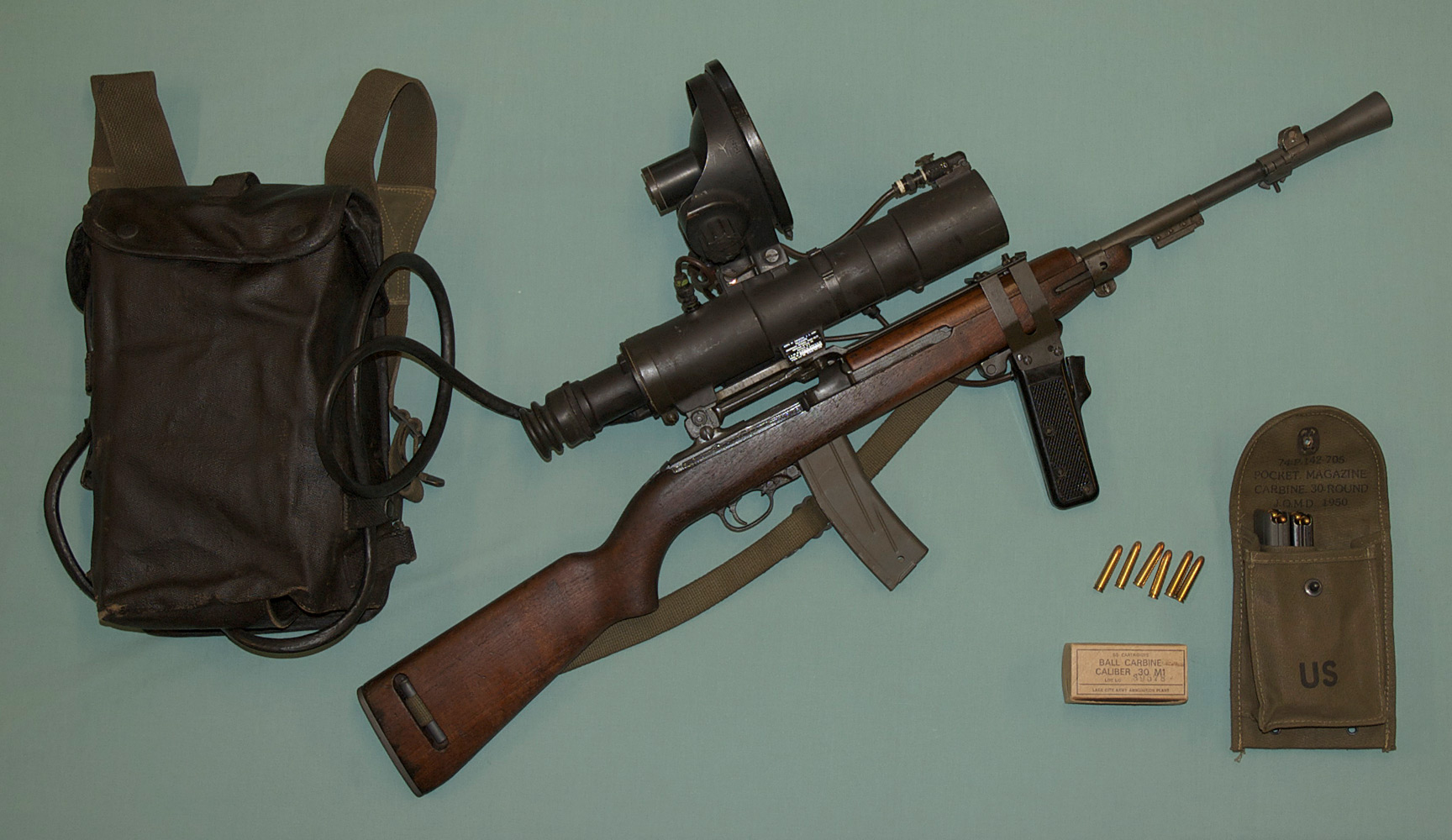
Original Korean War era USMC M3 with night vision scope

- M2 with mounting (T3 mount) for an early active (infrared) night vision sight
- About 3,000 produced
- Three versions of night sight (M1, M2, M3)

The M3 carbine was an M2 carbine fitted with a mount designed to accept an infrared sight for use at night. It was initially used with the M1 sniperscope, and an active infrared sight, and saw action in 1945 with the Army during the invasion of Okinawa. Before the M3 carbine and M1 sniperscope were type-classified, they were known as the T3 and T120, respectively. The system continued to be developed, and by the time of the Korean War, the M3 carbine was used with the M3 sniperscope.

The M2 sniperscope extended the effective nighttime range of the M3 carbine to 100 yd (91 m). In the later stages of the Korean War, an improved version of the M3 carbine, with a revised mount, a forward pistol grip, and a new M3 sniperscope design was used in the latter stages of Korea and briefly in Vietnam. The M3 sniperscope had a large active infrared spotlight mounted on top of the scope body itself, allowing use in the prone position. The revised M3/M3 had an effective range of around 125 yd (114 m). Eventually, the M3 carbine and its M3 sniperscope would be superseded by passive-design night vision scopes with extended visible ranges; the improved scopes in turn required the use of rifle-caliber weapons with flatter trajectories and increased hit probability.

== Military contractors ==
- Inland Division, General Motors (production: 2,632,097). Receiver marked "Inland Div." Sole producer of the M1A1 carbine.
- Winchester Repeating Arms (production: 828,059). Receiver marked "Winchester"
- Underwood Elliot Fisher (production: 545,616). Receiver marked "Underwood"
- Saginaw Steering Gear Division, General Motors (production: 517,213). Receivers marked "Saginaw S.G." (370,490), "Saginaw S'G'" (for weapons manufactured in Grand Rapids) and "Irwin-Pedersen" (146,723)
- Irwin-Pedersen (operated by Saginaw Steering Gear and production included with Saginaw total)
- National Postal Meter (production: 413,017). Receiver marked "National Postal Meter"
- Quality Hardware Manufacturing Corp. (production: 359,666). Receiver marked "Quality H.M.C." or "Un-quality" (receivers subcontracted to Union Switch & Signal).
- International Business Machines (production: 346,500). Receiver marked "I.B.M. Corp." Also barrel marked "IBM Corp"
- Standard Products (production: 247,100). Receiver marked "Std. Pro."
- Rock-Ola Manufacturing Corporation (production: 228,500). Receiver marked "Rock-Ola"
- Commercial Controls Corporation (production: 239). Receiver marked "Commercial Controls". Formerly National Postal Meter.

== Derivatives, conversions, and commercial copies ==
Inland Advisor pistol in .30 carbine

Several companies manufactured copies of the M1 carbine after World War II, which varied in quality. Some companies used a combination of original USGI and new commercial parts, while others manufactured entire firearms from new parts, which may or may not be of the same quality as the originals. These copies were marketed to the general public and police agencies but were not made for or used by the U.S. military.

In 1963, firearms designer Col. Melvin M. Johnson developer of the M1941 Johnson rifle offered the US Military a conversion of original US Military M1 carbines to his new 5.7mm MMJ cartridge, while also introducing a newly manufactured version of the M1 carbine called the "Spitfire" made by his Johnson Arms, Inc. business that was designed and built specifically for this new 5.7 mm (0.22 in) wildcat cartridge (also known as the 5.7 mm MMJ or .22 Spitfire). The Spitfire was advertised firing a 40-grain (2.6 g) bullet with a muzzle velocity of 3,050 ft/s (930 m/s), though handloaders with careful selection of modern powders and appropriate bullets consistently safely exceed those numbers while remaining within the M1 carbine's maximum pressure rating of 38,500 psi (265 MPa). In comparison, the "standard" load for the .30 Carbine has a .30 Carbine ball bullet weighing 110 grains (7.1 g); a complete loaded round weighs 195 grains (12.6 g) and has a muzzle velocity of 1,990 ft/s (610 m/s), giving it 967 ft⋅lbf (1,311 joules) of energy when fired from the M1 carbine's 17.75 in (451 mm) barrel.

Johnson advertised the smaller caliber and the modified carbine as a survival rifle for use in jungles or other remote areas. It provided for light, easily carried ammunition in a light, fast handling carbine with negligible recoil. While the concept had some military application when used for this role in the selective-fire M2 carbine, it was not pursued, and few Spitfire carbines were made.

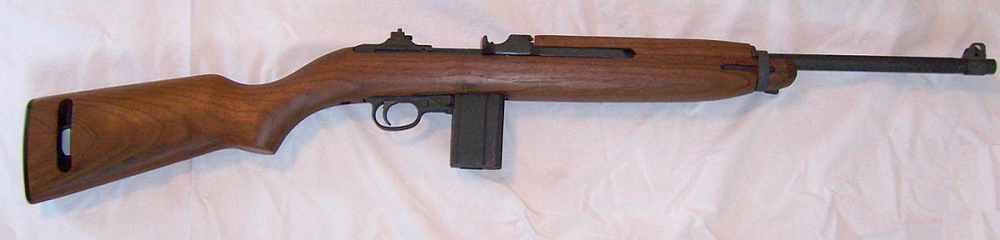
An Auto-Ordnance AOM-130 carbine manufactured in 2007

More recently, the Auto-Ordnance division of Kahr Arms began production of an M1 carbine replica in 2005 based on the typical M1 carbine as issued in 1944, without the later adjustable sight or barrel band with bayonet lug. The original Auto-Ordnance had produced various parts for IBM carbine production during World War II but did not manufacture complete carbines until the introduction of this replica. The AOM110 and AOM120 models (no longer produced) featured birch stocks and handguards, Parkerized receivers, flip-style rear sights and barrel bands without bayonet lugs. The current AOM130 and AOM140 models are identical except for American walnut stocks and handguards.

In 2014, Inland Manufacturing, LLC in Dayton, Ohio introduced the reproduction of the "Inland M1 carbine". Inland Manufacturing, LLC is a private entity that is producing reproductions of the M1 carbine and M1A1 paratrooper models that were built by the original Inland Division of General Motors from 1941 to 1945. The new Inland M1 carbines feature many of the same characteristics of the original Inland carbines and are manufactured in the US. The M1 carbine is modeled after the last production model that Inland manufactured in 1945 and features a Type 3 bayonet lug and barrel band, adjustable rear sights, push button safety, round bolt, and "low wood" walnut stock, and a 15-round magazine. A 30-round mag catch was utilized to allow high-capacity magazines. A "1944" M1 carbine is also available that has the same features as the 1945 only with a Type 2 barrel Band and 10-round magazine and is available for sale in most states with magazine capacity and bayonet lug restrictions. The M1A1 is modeled after a late production 1944 M1A1 paratrooper model with a folding "low wood" walnut stock, Type two barrel band, and includes the same adjustable sights which were actually introduced in 1944.

An Israeli arms company (Advanced Combat Systems) offers a modernized bullpup variant called the Hezi SM-1. The company claims accuracy of 1.5 MOA at 100 yards (91 m).

=== Commercial manufacturers ===
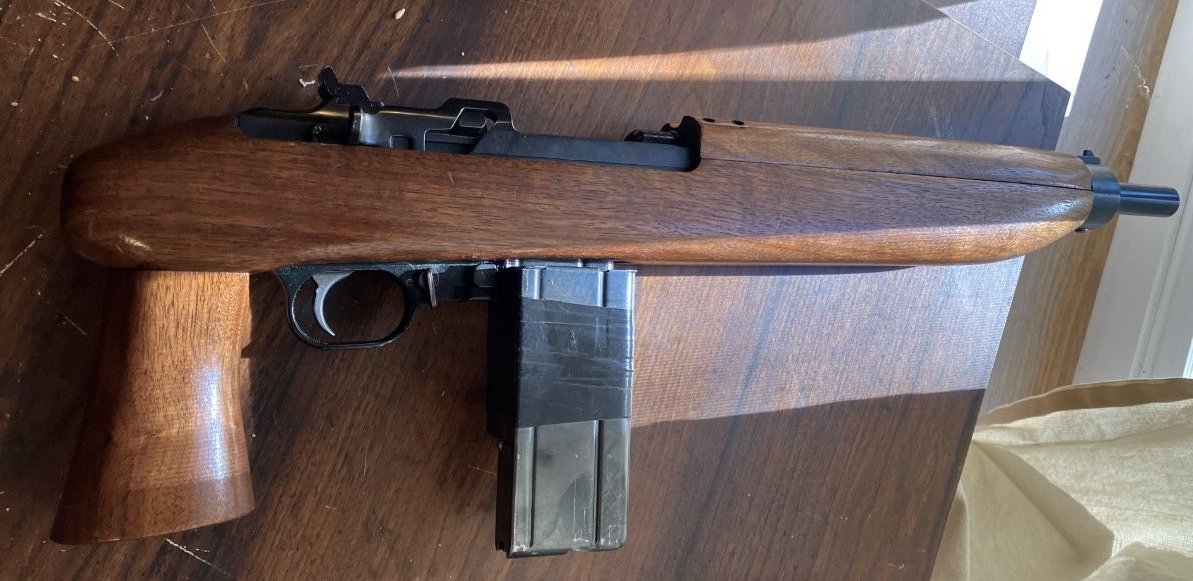
Universal Enforcer in .30 carbine

Iver Johnson Enforcer in .30 carbine

- Alpine of Azusa, California
- AMAC of Jacksonville, Arkansas (acquired Iver Johnson Arms)
- AMPCO of Miami, Florida
- Bullseye Gun Works of Miami, Florida
- ERMA's Firearms Manufacturing of Steelville, Missouri
- Erma Werke of Dachau, Bavaria, serviced carbines used by the West German police post-World War II. They manufactured replacement parts for the same carbines and .22 replica carbines for use as training rifles for police in West Germany and Austria and for commercial export worldwide.
- Federal Ordnance of South El Monte, California
- Fulton Armory of Savage, Maryland
- Global Arms
- H&S of Plainfield, New Jersey (Haas & Storck, predecessor of Plainfield Machine)
- Howa of Nagoya, Japan, made carbines and parts for the post-World War II Japanese and Thai militaries, and limited numbers of a hunting rifle version.
- Inland Manufacturing of Dayton, Ohio
- Israel Arms International (IAI) of Houston, Texas, assembled carbines from parts from other sources.
- The Iver Johnson Arms of Plainfield, New Jersey, and later Jacksonville, Arkansas, acquired M1 carbine operations of Plainfield Machine and followed the lead of Universal in producing a pistol version called the "Enforcer".
- Johnston-Tucker of St. Louis, Missouri
- Millvile Ordnance (MOCO) of Union, New Jersey (predecessor of H&S)
- National Ordnance of Azusa, California, and later South El Monte, California
- NATO of Atlanta, Georgia
- Plainfield Machine Company of Plainfield, New Jersey, and later Middlesex, New Jersey (PO Box in Dunellen, New Jersey); M1 carbine manufacture later purchased and operated by Iver Johnson
- Rock Island Armory of Geneseo, Illinois
- Rowen, Becker Company of Waterville, Ohio
- Springfield Armory of Geneseo, Illinois
- Texas Armament Co. of Brownwood, Texas
- Tiroler Sportwaffenfabrik und Apparatenbau GmbH of Kugstein, Austria, manufactured an air rifle that looked and operated like the M1 carbine for use in training by Austria and West Germany.
- Universal Firearms of Hialeah, Florida – early Universal guns were, like other manufacturers, assembled from USGI parts. However, beginning in 1968, the company began producing the "new carbine", which externally resembled the M1 but was in fact a completely new firearm internally, using a different receiver, bolt carrier, bolt, recoil spring assembly, etc. with almost no interchangeability with GI-issue carbines.
  Universal was acquired by Iver Johnson in 1983 and moved to Jacksonville, Arkansas, in 1985.
- Williams Gun Sight of Davison, Michigan, produced a series of 50 sporterized M1 carbines.

=== Derivatives ===
==== Ingram SAM ====
The Ingram SAM rifles are M1 carbine derivatives in 5.56×45mm NATO (SAM-1), 7.62×39mm (SAM-2) and 7.62×51mm NATO (SAM-3). The 5.56×45mm versions accept M16 magazines, the 7.62×39mm accept AK magazines and the 7.62×51mm versions use FN FAL magazines. They did not catch on in competition against the Ruger Mini-14 in both the police and civilian markets. The Ingram SAM rifles are occasionally found on auction sites for collectors.

==== 9×19mm Parabellum ====
Iver Johnson's 9×19mm Parabellum carbine was introduced in 1985, and, until 1986, used modified Browning Hi-Power 20-round magazines.

Chiappa Firearms produces a 9mm M1 carbine derivative called the M1-9 which uses Beretta M9/92FS magazines. The Chiappa is not gas operated and instead relies on blowback operation.

== Hunting and civilian use ==
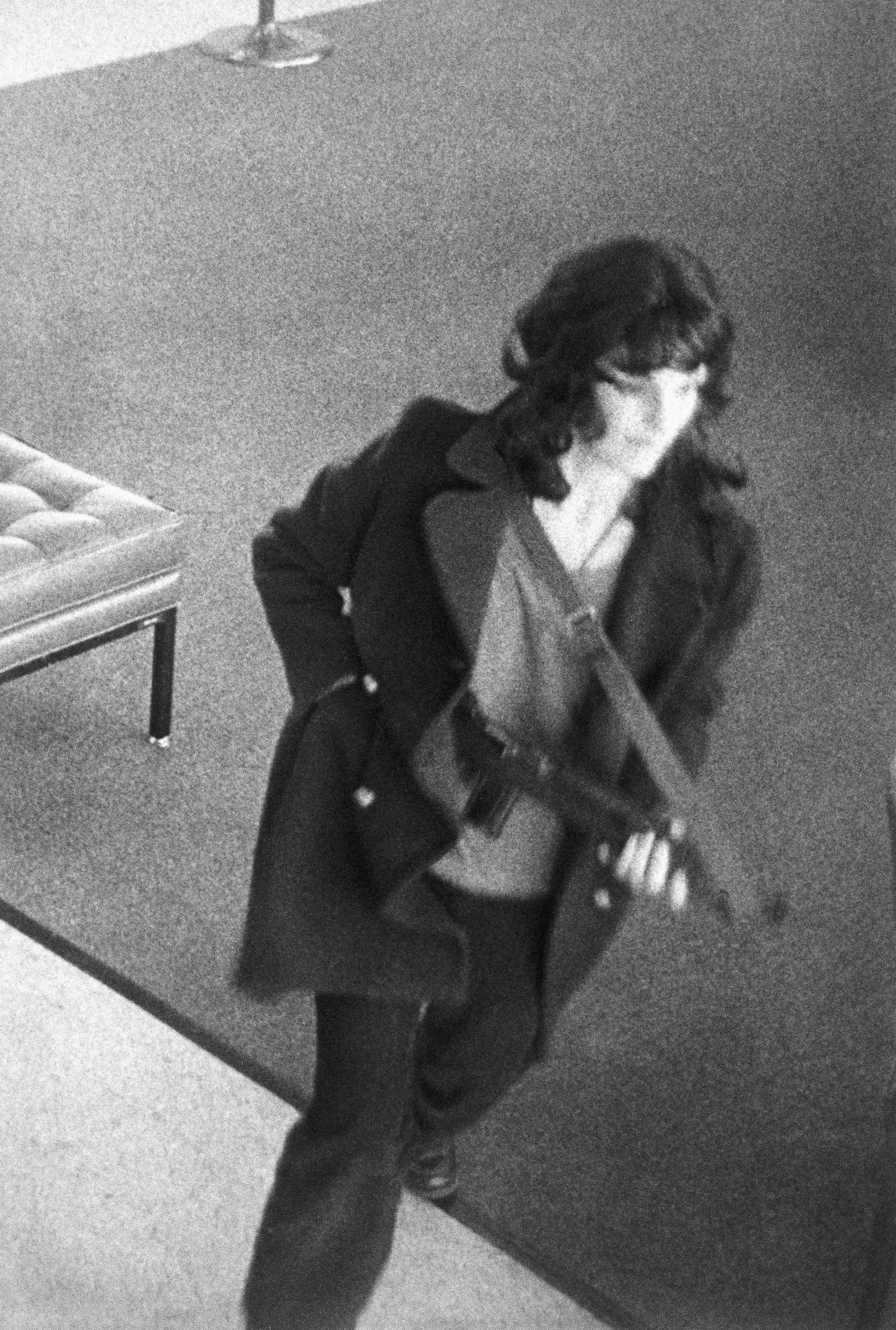
Patty Hearst holding a M1 "Enforcer" carbine during her infamous bank robbery attempt

Some U.S. states prohibit use of the .30 Carbine cartridge for hunting deer and larger animals due to a lessened chance of killing an animal in a single shot, even with expanding bullets. The M1 carbine is also prohibited for hunting in several states such as Pennsylvania because of the semi-automatic function. Five-round magazines are commercially made for use in states that limit the capacity of semi-automatic hunting rifles.

After World War II, the USA decommissioned surplus M1 carbines for sale to the general public. The last batch came from Blue Sky and Arlington Ordinance in 1963 and was sold to NRA members for $20 each. Inland Mfg continues to make new M1 carbine replicas.

The M1 carbine was also used by various law enforcement agencies and prison guards and was prominently carried by riot police during the civil unrest of the late 1960s and early 1970s; until it was replaced in those roles by more modern .223 caliber semi-automatic rifles such as the Ruger Mini-14 and the Colt AR-15-type rifles in the late 1970s and early 1980s.

The ease of use and great adaptability of the weapon led to it being used by Malcolm X and Patty Hearst. Both were featured in famous news photographs carrying a version the carbine. One of these firearms was also the weapon used in the 1947 assassination of notorious American mobster Benjamin "Bugsy" Siegel.

In 2025 the Canadian Government prohibited the sale and importation, and limited the use and exchange, of the M1 Carbine nationwide.

== Users ==
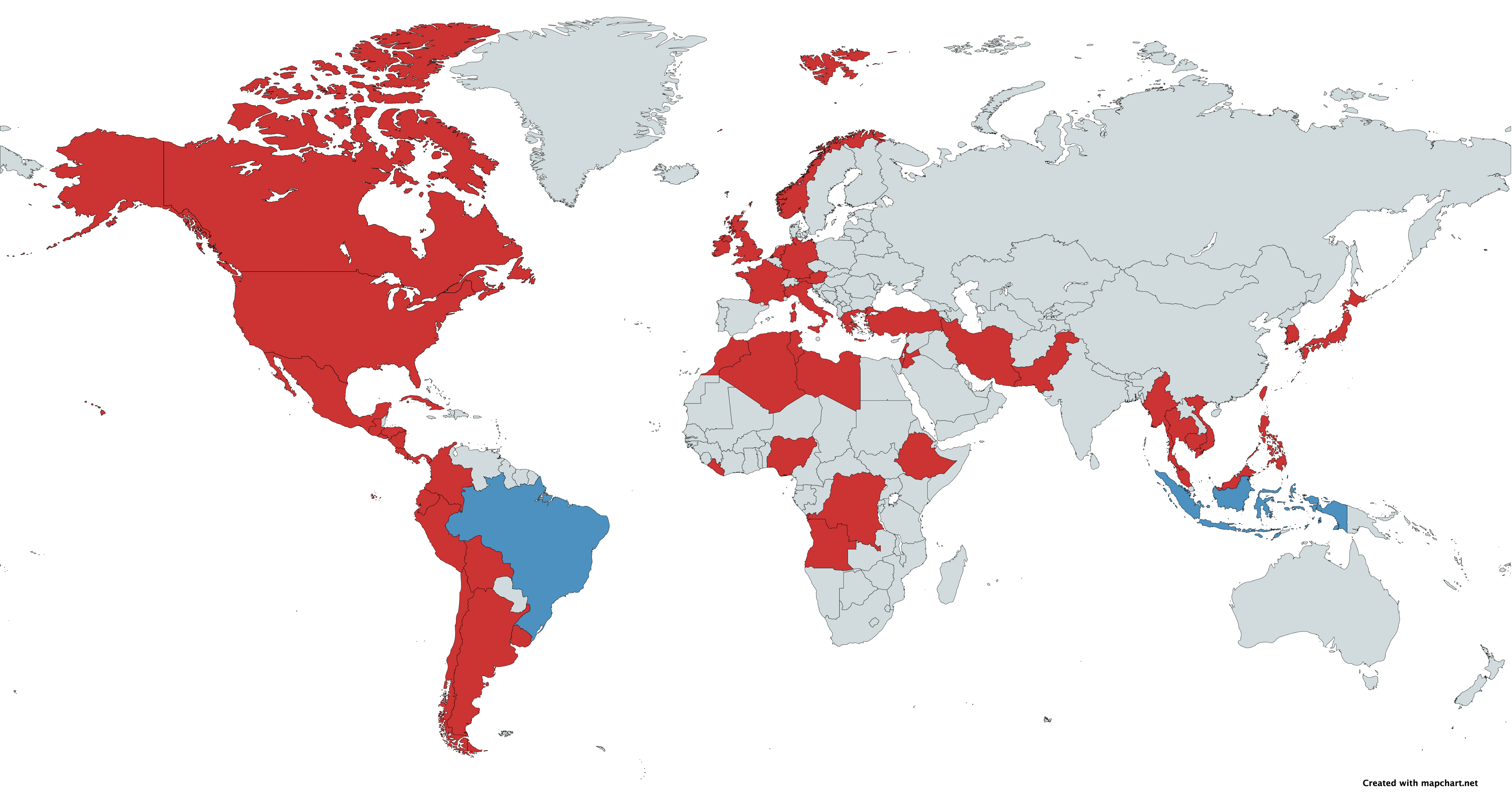
A map with users of the M1 Carbine in blue and former users in red

The unit data provided below refers to original U.S. Ordnance contract carbines the United States provided these countries. Many countries sold, traded, destroyed, and/or donated these carbines to other countries and/or private gun brokers.

=== Current users ===
- Brazil: In service with BOPE.
- Indonesia: Used by Indonesian Armed Forces in 1950s and 1960s (received from the United States). Fielded during the Indonesia–Malaysia confrontation Still in service in the Indonesian National Police

=== Former users ===
- Afghan Mujahideen
- Algeria: Captured in large numbers from French military personnel during the Algerian Independence War.
- Angola: 12,215 units
  - FNLA: Unknown number captured/illegally acquired for use during the Angolan Civil War.
- Austria: 39,005 units (1950s–70s, Austrian Army and police)
- Bolivia: 13,438 units.
- Cambodia: 115,568 units (Khmer Republic, 1967–1975)
- Canada: 230 units
- Chile: 2,877 units
- People's Republic of China: The People's Volunteer Army made use of captured guns during the Korean War
- Republic of China: 361 units during World War II.
  - Taiwan: 115,948 units from 1963 to 1968
- (Kingdom of Yugoslavia) Chetniks (OSS-supplied during WWII)
- Colombia: 7,037 units
- Costa Rica: 6,000 units
- Cuba: 118 units in 1963. M1 carbines were used by Batista forces, by Castrist militias and by Brigade 2506.
- Democratic Republic of Congo
- Dominican Republic
- Ecuador: 576 units
- El Salvador: 5,000 M1s and ~156 M2s until 1965, more delivered during the 1960s and 1970s.

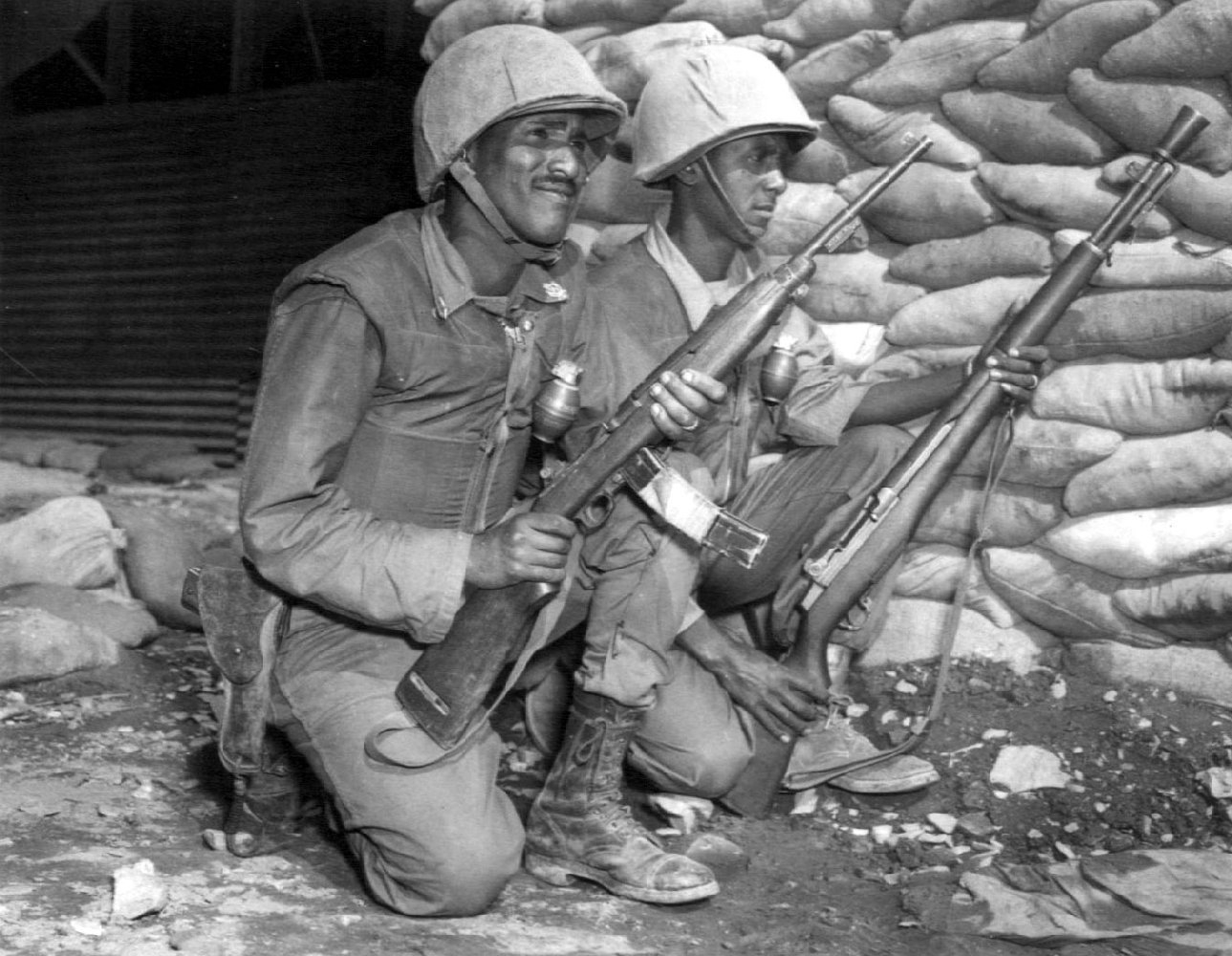
Ethiopian soldiers deployed with U.S.-made weapons somewhere in Korea in 1953. The M1 carbine has two 30-round magazines taped together "jungle style".

- Ethiopia: 16,417 units
- France: 269,644 units
  - French Indochina: 35,429 units
- Germany:
  - Nazi Germany: Captured M1 carbines were classified as the Selbstladekarabiner 455(a) ("Self-loading carbine No. 455 (American)"). There are staged pictures of late-war Fallschirmjäger troops and SS Leibstandarte Adolf Hitler ("Adolf Hitler's SS Bodyguard Regiment") soldiers armed with them. A limited number were issued to Volkssturm units.
  - West Germany: 34,192 units
    - Bavaria: 14,647 units (1945–early 1950s, border guard)
- Greece: 38,264 units from 1963 to 1973
- Guatemala: 6,063 units
- Honduras: 5,581 units
- British Hong Kong: Used by the Hong Kong Police Force during the 1967 Hong Kong riots, replaced by the AR-15.
- Iceland: 30 M1 carbine and 20 M2 carbine lent to the Reykjavík Police from Icelandic Coast Guard in 1986.
- Iran: 10,000 units
- Ireland: 1969–1980s, Used by the Provisional IRA, Official IRA, INLA and IPLO during the early years of their campaign and beyond.
- Israel: 10,000 units
- Italy: 146,863 units. First used by Italian partisans. Later classified by the Italian Army as the Carabina «Winchester» M1 cal. 7,62 and Carabina «Winchester» M2 cal. 7,62. In service until the 1990s with the Carabinieri.
- Japan: 3,974 units from 1950 to 1989
- Jordan: 1912 units. Fielded during the Six-Day War
- Kingdom of Laos: Received 74,587 units during Vietnam War and the Laotian Civil War, 1955–1975.
- Lebanon: 900 units
- Liberia: 80 units
- Libya: 106 units
- Malaysia
- Mexico: 48,946 units
- Morocco: 945 units
- Myanmar: 28,792 units

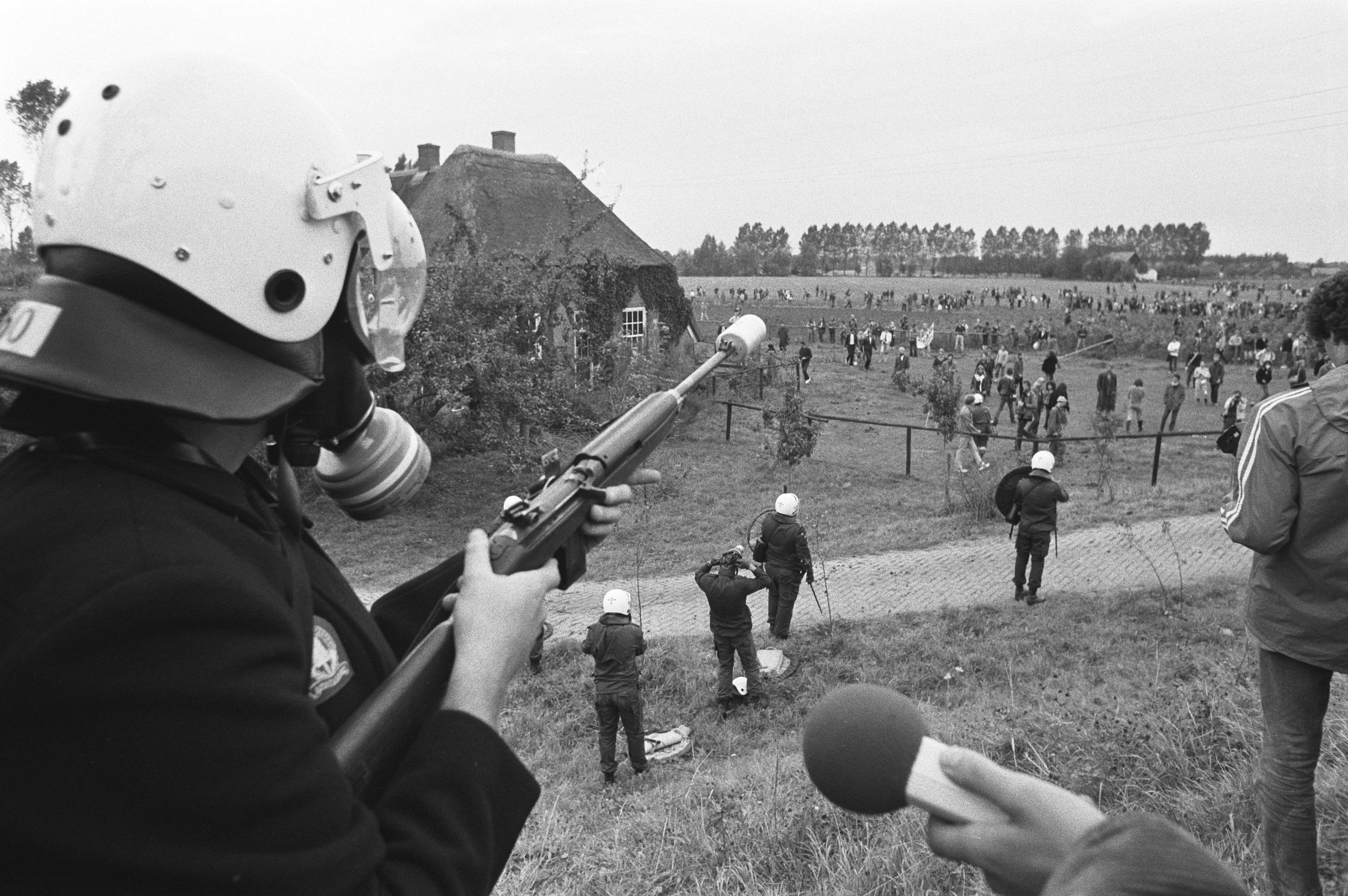
Dutch police officer shoots teargas ammunition from the muzzle of an M1 carbine, during a blockade and demonstration against the nuclear power plant Dodewaard. 18 September 1981

- Netherlands: 84,523 units (1940s–1980s, Army, Korps Mariniers and Police)
- Nicaragua: 121 units
- Nigeria: 100 units
- Norway: 98,267 units (Norwegian Army 1951–1970, with some Norwegian police units until the 1990s)
- Pakistan: 45 units
- Panama: 917 units
- Peru: 821 units
- Philippines: 8,831 units
- Somalia
- South Korea: The Armed Forces was equipped with 19,402 M1/M2 carbines before the Korean War, and received 219,700 more carbines throughout the war. By the end of the war, 159,393 carbines were in service with the Army. 1,015,558 additional M1/M2 carbines also received from the U.S. between 1963 and 1972, these guns were provided to the Reserve Forces in 1968. Carbines were used during the Vietnam War until the U.S. started supplying M16A1s in 1967. All carbines were replaced by license produced M16A1 rifles, and were removed from active service in 1978. Some of these M1 carbines were sold back to the United States: 100,000 carbines in 1986 to 1989 via Blue Sky, and 100,000 carbines in 1991 to 1993 via Century Arms. In 2005, the Reserve Forces began replacing carbines with 850,000 M16A1s that are decommissioning from active service. Since 2006, South Korea attempted to sell 770,160 M1 carbines back to the United States, but was rejected by the Obama Administration in 2013. The replacement for carbine was completed in 2016.
- Thailand: 73,012 units from 1963 to 1976
- Tunisia: 771 units
- Turkey: 450 units.
- United Kingdom: 200,766 units
- United States: 6,110,730 units (1940s–1960s/1970s, Armed Forces and 1940s-present, various law enforcement agencies, and the Tennessee Valley Authority)
- Uruguay: 32,346 units
- USSR: 7 units
- Vietnam: Largely captured and/or inherited from now-defunct Army of the Republic of Vietnam. Some used by the Viet Cong and the Viet Minh, taken from American, French and South Vietnamese forces/armories with a few modified to make them compact. Clones made, chambered in 7.62x25mm to use 35-round magazines.
  - South Vietnam: 793,994 units (1960s–70s)

== See also ==
- List of U.S. Army weapons by supply catalog designation
- T29 – American submachine gun
