= Action Man =

Action figure

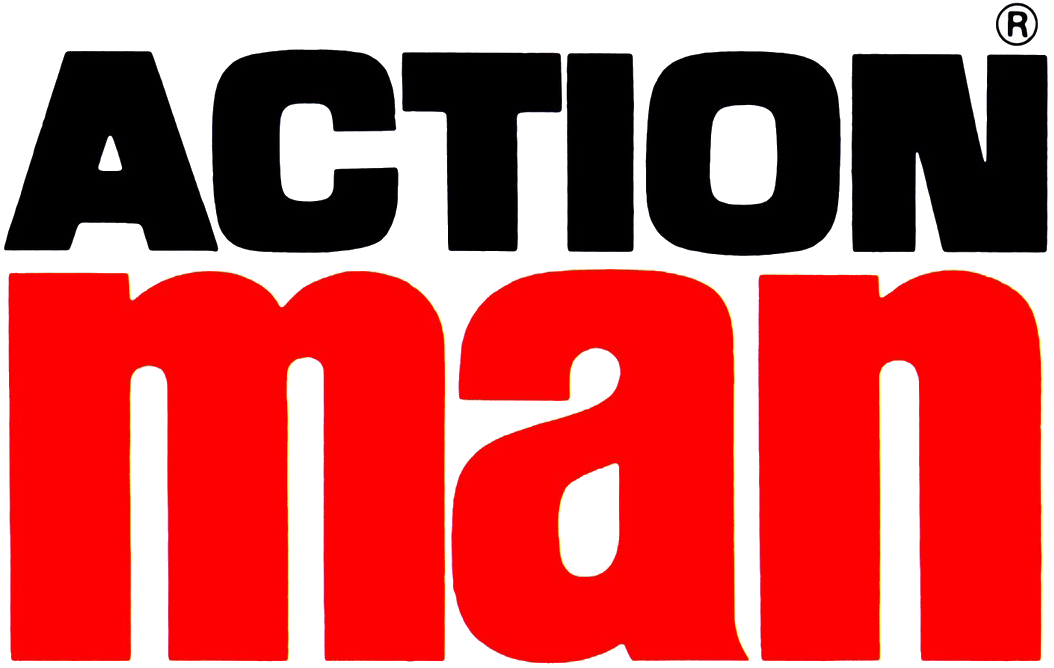
- Product type: Action figure
- Current owner: Hasbro
- Produced by: Palitoy
- Country: United Kingdom
- Introduced: 1966
- Discontinued: 1984 (Note: Re-issued 1993–2006, 2009.)
- Related brands: G.I. Joe; Tommy Gunn
- Website: actionman.com

Action Man is an action figure brand launched in the United Kingdom in 1966 by Palitoy as a licensed copy of Hasbro's American "movable fighting man", G.I. Joe. It details the titular character as an action hero who fights Dr. X and other villains.

Action Man was originally produced and sold in the United Kingdom and Australia by Palitoy Ltd of Coalville, Leicestershire from 1966 until 1984. Palitoy offered sub-licences to toy manufacturers in other markets.

The figure and accessories were originally based on the Hasbro (US) 1964 G.I. Joe figure, for 1966–1969 production. Hasbro's G.I. Joe figure was patented in 1966. Even the specific method of attaching the appendages was patented as a "Connection for Use in Toy Figures". The first Action Man figures were Action Soldier, Action Sailor and Action Pilot. All were available in the four original hair colours: Blonde, Auburn, Brown and Black. They were accompanied by outfits depicting the United States Armed Forces of World War II and the Korean War. From 1970 to 1984, the basic boxed figures and accompanying uniforms and accessories reflected the forces of the United Kingdom rather than the United States. Action Man was reintroduced in 1993, based on the G.I. Joe Hall of Fame figure of that time.

== History ==
=== Beginnings and success ===
From 1964, Palitoy, a British subsidiary of General Mills, was the UK licensee for Hasbro Industries. Palitoy developed from a plastics firm, established by Alfred Edward Pallett in 1909 and became one of Britain's leading toy manufacturers, until its closure in 1984.

In 1964, Sales Director Hal Belton returned from the United States with a new toy called G.I. Joe as a present for his grandson. When he realised that it was well received by his grandson he "borrowed" the toy and presented it to the General Manager Miles Fletcher. Miles and his Production Director Brian Wybrow made contact with Hasbro at the New York toy fair the next year. Samples were acquired from Hasbro and marketing research was carried out – Palitoy employees were given samples to take home for their children to test. The controversy at the time was "should boys be playing with a doll". Palitoy (as Hasbro before) ignored these concerns and the word "doll" was banned when discussing the new toy.

A name was needed and Gee Advertising was commissioned to come up with some ideas. A list was passed around the company (as remembered by Stuart Moore, designer of the successful Tiny Tears) for people to cast their preference. One name remembered was "Ace 21" because the mannequin had 21 separate components. Both Peter Watson, of Gees, and Les Cooke, Palitoy Brand Manager (later to become managing director), claim authorship of the name Action Man, but it was Sales Manager Harry Trowell who suggested the name to Miles Fletcher over lunch at the local pub, the Fox and Goose. Eventually after lengthy negotiation a licensing deal to produce the toy using Hasbro tooling and Far East sourcing was agreed in late 1965, just prior to the launch at the British Toy Fair in January 1966.

In the early years, Action Man competed with the entirely British Tommy Gunn by Pedigree Toys who were the producers of the Sindy doll. The Tommy Gunn figure copied aspects of Hasbro's G.I. Joe, released two years earlier in the United States. Regardless, Tommy Gunn was generally regarded as a higher quality in terms of equipment and accuracy of accessories, especially since the Action Man of the 1960s was little more than a re-packaged G.I. Joe. He was ultimately unable to compete with Action Man and was discontinued in 1968. In the late 1960s and early 1970s, many other companies produced competition for Action Man, but all were of the cheap blow-moulded variety, which produces thin-walled components lacking the articulation and sturdiness of the Palitoy components, which utilised more costly Injection and Rotational moulding processes.

Action Man was developed with primarily British themes from 1970 onwards: military, adventurers, and sportsman, as Palitoy wanted to distinguish their product line from the U.S. counterpart. (Bill) William A.G. Pugh was the head of Action Man's product development at Palitoy, and can be credited with the development of innovations to the product line which included the flocked hair and gripping hands, which crossed over to the G.I. Joe line. Hasbro realised adding a new feature to the manikin helped to maintain sales and developed the Eagle Eyes feature, invented by James A. King, a Hasbro engineer, which was adopted by Palitoy for Action Man, and by extension to that of other Hasbro licensees.

One series that truly set Palitoy's line apart from Hasbro's was the "Ceremonials". Although Hasbro had a set of Cadet ceremonial outfits, they did not match the scope and range of the British versions, which also included a horse of the Life Guards with full ceremonial regalia as an optional set. The non-military was also covered with adventurous elements such as mountain rescue, Arctic exploration, scuba and deep sea diving. One outfit was only available through the Action Man stars scheme; the Royal Canadian Mounted Police (and accompanying mastiff dog). In the G.I. Joe lineup, this outfit was sold with figure in a variety of configurations through Hasbro Canada.

=== Hasbro relaunch ===
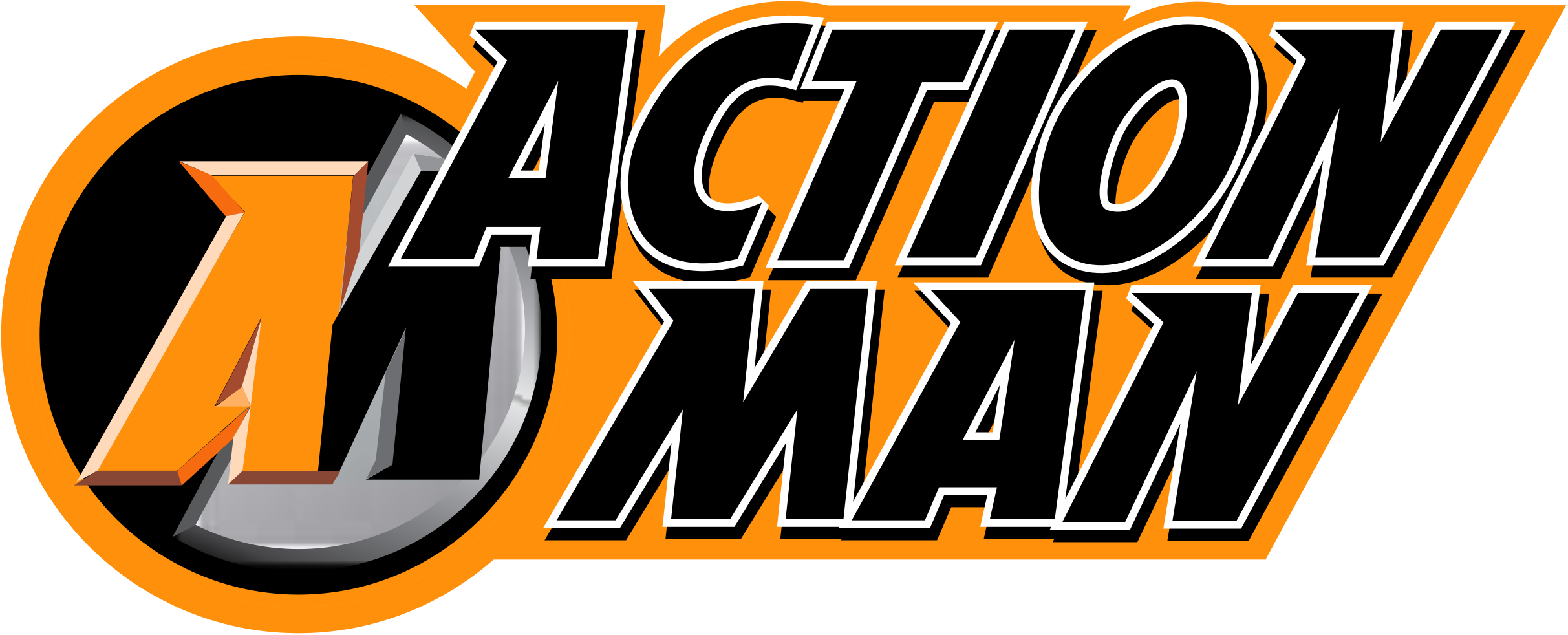
Action Man logo by Hasbro

The military style Action Man toys made a brief resurgence in the early 1990s, but between 1995 and 2006 Hasbro used the name without any military theme as a modern adventurer complete with arch-enemies Dr. X and Professor Gangrene. Marketing changed from producing a basic figure with the option to buy several different outfits to each product being its own stand-alone figure, with included accessories such as an outfit and equipment for a given "mission". This specialisation together with improved production techniques led to figures with built-in abilities, such as karate moves or a working blowpipe.

A 3 3/4 inch sized Action Man was sold in 2004 as part of a G.I. Joe 'Night Force' set sold exclusively at the Toys 'R' Us chain of stores in the United States.

=== Collectors' version ===
In 2006 Hasbro licensed reproductions of a variety of the original boxed Action Man figures, under the 40th Anniversary "Nostalgic Collection" banner, in a packaging format similar to Hasbro's G.I. Joe "40th Anniversary" collection.

=== Subsequent revivals ===
At the 2011 New York Comic Con, Hasbro distributed a catalogue titled 'UNIT E' featuring comic strips based on several Hasbro properties, some of which were defunct. Among the latter toy ranges was a new iteration of Action Man, dubbed 'The Action Man'. However, the comic was produced as a "brain storming" concept, and the comic's introduction specifically noted that none of the concepts within the book were guaranteed to ever see production or release.

The Action Man character was again rebooted by IDW Publishing in 2016 for a four-issue limited comic book series. The series was published to commemorate the fiftieth anniversary of Action Man, with the cover of each issue featuring the original Palitoy-era Action Man logo.

== Appearance: 1966–1984 ==
=== Figure construction ===
The original 1964 Action Man had a moulded vinyl painted head (which sometimes shrank and became harder, as with Hasbro's figures), with a livid scar on the cheek registered as a trademark, identical to G.I. Joe. Talking Commander figures often have the soft vinyl painted head also used for talking G.I. Joe figures. Action Man figures of the seventies tend to have a pinker colouration than G.I. Joe; the feet are of the smaller original G.I. Joe variety. They were held together by elastic with crimped metal eyelets through which rivets passed, for the legs, and metal hooks retaining the neck post and shoulders.

Pre-1970 bodies used the painted-rivets similar to G.I. Joe, 1970–1977 bodies have chromed rivets which were not used on the Hasbro U.S. version. Especially noticeable with 1970 is that on figures, the limb sections tend to be slightly smaller than the G.I. Joe counterpart, hence Action Man is slightly shorter in height, very similar to the "Masterpiece Edition" G.I. Joe. The pelvis, also smaller, has an extra ridge on each side immediately above the buttocks, which also distinguishes it from the U.S. version, trademarkings aside. The Canadian G.I. Joe body uses this pelvis. Bodies from 1978 on are all-plastic construction, with a flexible rubber connection for the neck post (this is subject to deterioration).

=== Gripping Hands ===
The initial releases had hands that were virtually identical to those of G.I. Joe. The hands were always an element of frustration, as observed by (Bill) William A.G. Pugh during setups for the annual toy fairs; he found it was hard to get them to really hold any of the accessories securely. Being of hard vinyl construction, glue had to be used to secure the accessories. As a result, gripping hands were the next feature to be introduced in 1973; the hard moulded hands of the original were replaced by a flexible vinyl. These hands were invented by Bill Pugh and designed and sculpted by Chief Designer, Bob Brechin, using his left hand as a model.

A modified, simpler version was used by Hasbro for G.I. Joe in 1974. A thimble was provided with each boxed figure to protect the fingers when changing its outfit. The early (pre 1978) vinyl is prone to breakdown as with the G I Joe version; the deterioration of 73–77 flex hands includes hardening of the outer layers, cracks, discolouration, fingers breaking off and sometimes shrivelling.

=== Flocked hair and Eagle Eyes ===
The first innovation for Action Man was a form of flocking giving the effect of a short "fuzzy" hairstyle in 1970, very similar to the hair flocking used on early "Ken" dolls produced by Mattel. Bill Pugh contacted the company he saw on a TV programme producing bottles covered with a flocked fibre. Dracon Limited, whose promotional items included a flocked car, provided the basis for the electrostatic process that would give Action Man his new look.

With the introduction of the soft flock-haired head, all figures came with blue eyes unlike the painted heads and G.I. Joe Adventurers that still had brown eyes in some instances. This flocking innovation crossed back over the Atlantic and was introduced for G.I. Joe within the year. The equipment for Hasbro's G.I. Joe was assembled and tested in the UK before being crated and shipped to Hong Kong for mass production. Hong Kong was also the location of Palitoy's production. G.I. Joe's "sea adventurer" was a bearded redhead, never used in the UK market.

The Action Man Sailor now dressed for the Royal Navy sported a similarly produced beard in blonde or brown only. Unlike G.I. Joe, Action Man was truly ubiquitous; he had only one face, regardless of euro-centric nationality, whereas G.I. Joe had two ethnic variants, commonly referred to as "Foreign Heads"; one European, one Japanese. Palitoy did not market the brown-skinned figure sold as African American in the pre-1970s G.I. Joe lineup.

For the initial 1970–71 production run, some "soft" painted heads were treated to the flock-haired makeover by Palitoy and distributed to the public. These figures are commonly found as the blue-eyed variant, but the rare combination of flocked hair and brown eyes can also be found on an original Action Man. There are also a range of skin tones, some were paler, some were warmer in tone; all these permutations give each and every figure a personality of their own. The fact that these were hand-painted is often evidenced in the appearance of variations such as mismatched eye colouration. Given the length of time the figure was in production, it is quite possible to find heads that have been altered, but that still may appear to be "factory". The only Action Man that came with sideburns and not a full beard, was the "Georgie Best" footballer figure.

The next major shift in marketing of the doll occurred with the introduction of an improved head with "Eagle Eyes" in 1976, which had been invented by George W. Ptaszek and James A. King at Hasbro. The design utilized a mechanism operated by a simple lever at the back of the head, moving the gaze of the eyeballs back and forth – an improvement on the fixed stare of the original albeit at the price of a slightly larger head, and the loss of the original facial features of the previous 10 years. For Action Man, the head was only available in brown and blonde hair and only blue eyes, with bearded versions of each, GI Joe also had red flocking.

=== Trademarkings and ID tags ===
From 1966 to 1977, he was tagged on his lower back "Made in England By Palitoy Under Licence From Hasbro ® 1964", instead of on his right buttock, as was G.I. Joe. Early talker variants were similarly marked. Later standard figures from 1978 to 1984 were marked "CPG Products Corp 1978". Later talker variants were marked "© 1975 Hasbro® Pat Pend Pawt R.I. Made in Japan" or "General Mills. Toy Group. Europe © 1975 Pat. No. 1458647". Talker torsos were held together with 2 screws recessed in the left and right shoulders, and from 1978, 2 additional screws above the hip line.

Early Action Man came with a dogtag similar to G.I. Joe's; a thin stamped aluminum tag. From 1970 on, Palitoy devised their own design, made of hard plastic with "bullet holes" passing through the logo, and cast in grey or green, which was used until the 1980s. Talkers have the tag attached directly to the pull cord, standard bodies have the tag attached to a small chain. In the 1980s, a modified identity tag with decals to be applied was released; these decals vary according to the figure. On talker figures, the tag was tied directly to the pull-string, on standard bodies, it was suspended by a black cord around the neck. The Hasbro-authorised reproductions of the 1960s metal and 1970s identity tags are virtually indistinguishable from the original.

All original Action Man uniforms were tagged inside the neck collar; the early issue even had the bullet holes of the box logo. This was later discontinued. The fabric used for the tags also varied, by the late seventies/early eighties a synthetic fabric was used.

=== Body variations 1978–84 ===
In 1977, the official catalogue included four new figures. Three of them were variations on the standard Action Man; a cyborg Atomic Man (influenced by The Six Million Dollar Man television series), a dark-skinned (African ethnic) Commando Tom Stone, a red and silver superhero Bullet Man, and lastly a brutish Neanderthal look-alike; The Intruder, which was a minimally articulated figure. All were taken from Hasbro, though Atomic Man although taken from the same mould as G.I. Joe's "Mike Powers", was given flocked hair and a silver plastic "Heart Plug" with a black button in its center. "Tom Stone" was a repackaged African-ethnic Hasbro Muscle Body Action Adventurer, Palitoy never produced any of the ethnic figures in the line themselves. Both Bullet Man and Tom Stone utilized the body Hasbro patented: "Posable figure having one piece connector for torso, legs".

From 1978 to the end of the original period of Action Man in 1984, the body was replaced with an entirely new design: at a glance, the most obvious detail is fact that the flesh coloured pelvic area of the body was replaced with a blue section giving the effect of blue shorts rather than the sexless mannequin look; at the same time the body took on a more muscular tone. This body type was known as the "Dynamic Physique. This was mainly designed by Designer Ivor Edmunds, with help from Chief Designer Bob Brechin under the direction of Bill Pugh. Tooling and material selection was under the supervision of Process Manager Alec Langton.

The tooling that produced the components for the Hasbro designed manikin were wearing badly and delivering poor quality mouldings; this was because the tooling was, what is known as "family tools" (all components to produce the limbs of the manikin were moulded on the same tool), it meant that if one component was below standard the whole shot was potentially scrap. However what was happening in production was that the good components were used but there became an imbalance in the numbers of good components, so substandard mouldings were reworked to make them acceptable and good components were ground up with bad components and the sprues for remoulding.

This was becoming very uneconomic. The mouldings for the new Dynamique Physique manikin were moulded on non-family hot-runner tools (no sprues to be recycled). That is a separate tool for each component. It was easy to maintain equal numbers of components to make up the figures and the quality was assured. Prototype tooling using the hot-runner system was organised by Alec Langton to prove the manufacturing and design, as well as provide sales samples and product for toy fairs.

The brief for the design was to eliminate rivets and elastic of the Hasbro design yet maintain full manoeuvrability of the manikin. A construction based on snap-together components (known as the "skeleton") covered by an outer moulding (the "muscles") was devised for the arms and legs which were assembled by hand (no jigs and fixtures needed). The assembled limbs were held in a two-part torso ("clam shell" design) which was sonic welded together (the only mechanical process involved). The biggest challenge to the designers was the design of the hip area. The final solution, and thus maintaining the full manoeuvrability of the figure, was solved by Designer Peter Mansell. Figures from the prototype tooling were produced with green underpants, whereas in production they were moulded blue. The U.S. patent was applied for in November 1977.

The Dynamique Physique figure continued until Action Man was "demobbed" in 1984. A new marketing feature was required and in 1980 a notch was added to the neck (like an Adam's Apple) to allow the head to be held back in a "sharpshooter" pose. This was the idea of Toby Hawkes, the son of John Hawkes, who was design director after Bill Pugh.

The talking Action Commander released in the late sixties issued eight commands at random (depending on how far out is pulled the cord): "This is your commander speaking", "Enemy aircraft action stations", "Volunteer needed for a special mission", "Enemy in sight: range 1000", "Action Man patrol fall in", "Hold your fire until I give the order", "Mortar attack dig in", and "Commander to base request support fire". The Dynamic Physique Talker introduced in 1978 had only five commands: "Enemy Tanks Approaching", "Give Me Some Cover", "Send Out The Patrol", "What's the password" and "Advance in Single File".

== Soldier ==
Action Man "Soldier" figure appeared in 1966 using the Hasbro GI Joe box graphics and US army outfit. In 1970 the UK outfit and revised Palitoy box graphics were introduced. It became one of the most popular Action Man figures. The figure from 1973 consisted of olive green jumper, trousers, scarf, black beret, and boots, with rifle.

== Sailor ==
Action Man "Sailor" figure appeared in 1966 using the Hasbro GI Joe box graphics and US sailor outfit. In 1970 the UK outfit and revised Palitoy box graphics were introduced.

== Desert fighter ==
Action Man "Desert Fighter" figure is one of the rarest original Action Man figures, who appeared in 1975. Figure only wore khaki shorts, bush hat, and boots, with Thompson submachine gun.

== Adventurer ==
Action Man "Adventurer" figure appeared in 1970. Usually bearded, the figure wore a jumper, jeans, and boots.

=== Spacemen ===
A new line was released featuring spacemen: Captain Zargon (the Space Pirate), and Zargonite and Space Ranger Captain. Captain Zargon used the same body mould, but in black plastic with silver printed tattoos and a "skull" head inside a moulded helmet. At the same time, Action Man gained a new set of equipment under the Space Ranger title, including a "Space speeder", a two-man four-in-one vehicle, and the single occupant "Solar Hurricane".

The outfits were futuristic rather than previous space suits which had been based on the equipment of the Gemini and Apollo missions. Subsequent Space Rangers had cloth outfits, rather than the somewhat impractical rubber of the first release. One Space Ranger produced by Palitoy was only sold in the European market under the "Group Action Joe" licensee as Captain Cosmos.

Another Space Ranger was the Millennium 2000 Special Edition. In 1980, one more figure not based on the Action Man doll was added: "ROM" the Robot, licensed from Parker Brothers and originally called Rom Spaceknight, that would be adapted into a long-running comic book series by Marvel.

== Packaging: 1960s–80s ==
=== Figure boxes ===
The initial releases of the basic figures were packaged in boxes just slighter taller than the figure, with dynamic graphics depicting the figures in action poses on the front and back, with photos of the various accessory sets on the left and right side panels. The graphics were direct copies of those used for the U.S. 1964–1968 production G.I. Joe. The boxes featured wood grain background detail for soldiers, blue background for sailor, and yellow/brown for pilot.

The boxes opened at the top, rather than the lidded version used in the U.S., for G.I. Joe. The figure enclosed was dressed in basic fatigues appropriate to the military branch, but since this did not match the box graphics, it raised truth in advertising issues, since the purchaser could rightly assume the contents "should" match the packaging. As a result, the boxes were modified to include a photo image on the lower right of the actual contents. From 1970 on, the graphics depicted the actual dressed figure as enclosed.

=== Wooden footlocker ===
As with G.I. Joe, during the 1960s, Action Man had a wooden footlocker (Kit locker box) with a plastic tray insert to store his accessories in. It is overall dimensionally identical to the G.I. Joe item, but the production details varied.

=== Uniform sets ===
Starting in 1970, Palitoy largely departed from Hasbro's lineup though some items and accessories and vehicles were still based on Hasbro's moulds. Palitoy created a wide range of uniform sets for the UK market. British military formed a large part of this range, with ceremonial outfits being among the most spectacular. From a collectors standpoint, they are very desirable. Many outfits were available as complete boxed figure sets. Some outfits were sold in a box format, some came with a Locker Box to store the outfit when not in use.

There were six "soldiers of the century", which matched Hasbro's six "soldiers of the world", with the exception of the Japanese outfit and figure, which was never offered in the Palitoy range. These sets included an "intelligence manual" that covered all the available offerings in the lineup, and pages on light and heavy weapons, officer rank insignia, and morse code. As with G.I. Joe, early issue clothing is consistently of a heavier and more durable fabric although in terms of scale, the thinner fabric is more appropriate.

The standard boxed soldier from 1973 onwards was outfitted with the then current "NATO" pullover, khaki lightweight trousers, short boots, scarf, black beret, and SLR rifle typical of the British Army barracks wear of the time. A contemporary boxed talking field officer was also available. The deep sea diver was so innovative it was also patented by Sam Speers.

=== Uniform details ===
Palitoy was quite particular about the level and attention to detail for their uniforms and accessory detailing; in some respects, some outfits were fairly simplistic compared to the actual outfit (certainly in comparison to the level of detail achieved with modern offerings from Dragon and other action figure companies) as can be seen in any of the product catalogs on offer from a variety of online vendors. Palitoy created appropriate insignia, such as the British Royal Military Police Cap and other uniform. The standard dropped by the end of the 1970s for number of reasons, not the least of which being rising production costs. With 1960s and early 1970s variations, often they were die-cast instead of plastic, the uniforms themselves were of heavy cotton and chevrons were typically embroidered and sewn on, rather than paper decals. Over the many years Action Man was in production, almost every item produced for the line had a multitude of variations.

=== Boxed sets ===
Over the course of Action Man production, a wide variety of boxed sets were sold; one popular at the time of the BBC's Colditz television series in the 1970s was "Escape from Colditz", which provided both. Included were reproductions of a variety of Prisoner of war artifacts from Colditz, and a history. An "Escape from Colditz" board game had already been released by Parker Brothers (UK), a division of Palitoy.

The Radio BackPack was also sold in a deluxe set with Action Man Field Officer. Spain's Geyperman, although a Hasbro Licensee, used Palitoy's product line as the basis for their products.

=== Literature and star scheme ===
All boxed figures came with certain pieces of literature, usually an "Equipment Manual", a catalogue of then current offerings that children could wish for, a star scheme card and a usage guide for the specific figure type that illustrated how to use and care for the flex hands, eagle eyes, etc., as appropriate.

Some outfits and figure sets came with instructions for proper use and care, they illustrate the identical items offered for G.I. Joe at that time; the only variation is the absence of Marine items offered in the U.S.

Other related items were also produced; in the 1960s–70s there were companion leaflets for various sets that provided background information on the actual activity/military division. In 1977 six novels were published under the pseudonym Mike Brogan, and into the 1980s, Action Man annuals were released.

Virtually all Action Man packaging from 1966 came with stars; the more expensive the item, the more stars it came with, with a scale of 1 to 5 stars. These stars were intended to be clipped from the packaging, and affixed to a "Star Scheme" sheet that came with boxed figures. It had spaces for up to 21 stars, and included a list of the various items available for varying numbers of stars collected, with a "free" unclothed figure being the top item. The Royal Canadian Mounted Police, his dog, and various outfits were available over the life of the program, which continued till the end of Action Man's production in 1984. Figures redeemed through the star scheme were sent in a plain manila cardboard box. The Star Scheme is credited with the poor availability of intact packaging for collectors.

=== Carded accessories and weapons ===
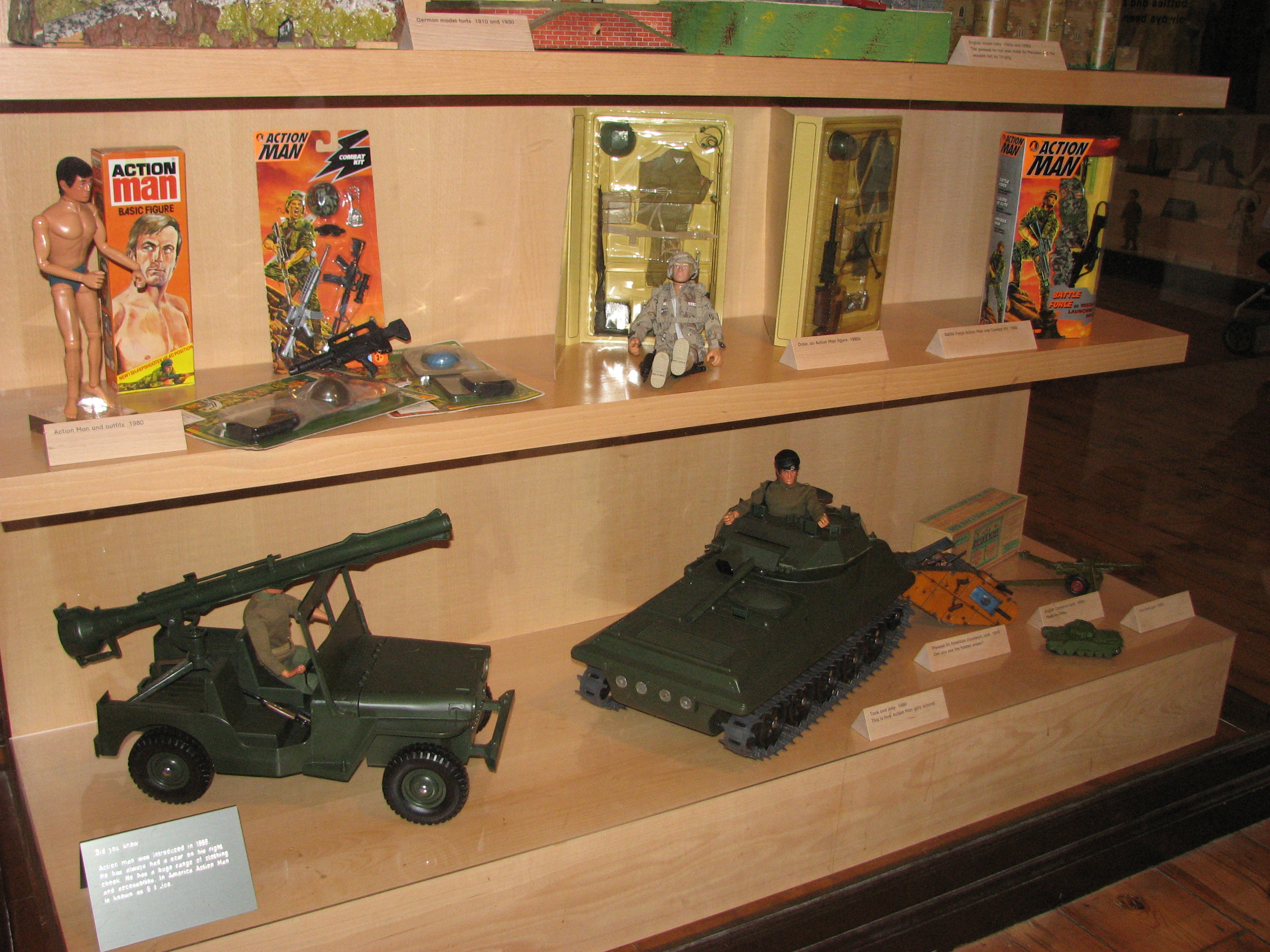
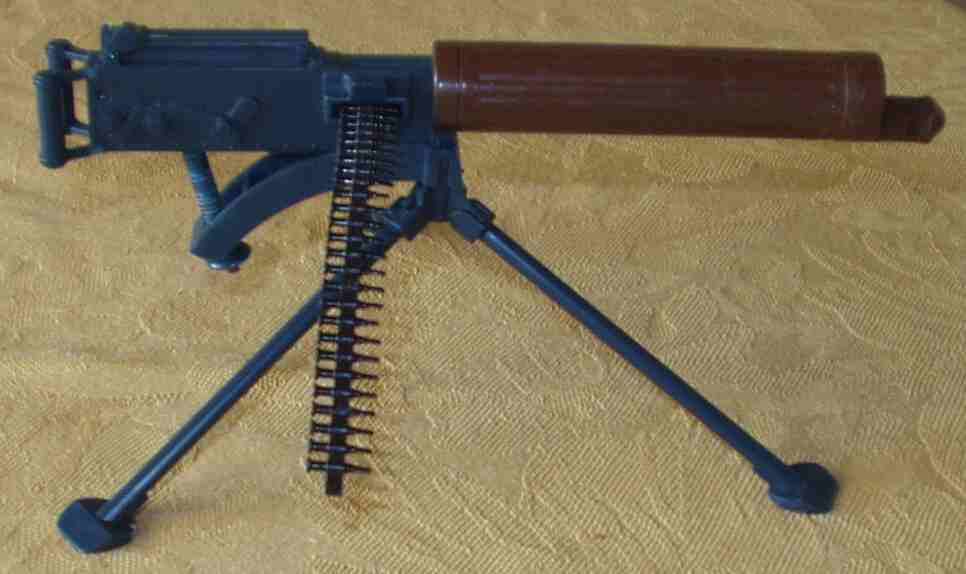
Left: Action Man figures and vehicles exhibited in London; right: Vickers machine gun, approximately 1/6th scale

Small items were offered on blister pack carding in the 1970s–80s. Earlier versions of the Robin James Sullivan toys from the sixties were identical to G.I. Joes'; woodgrain background, plastic wrapped, with a small rivet hole for display/retail. The early items mirrored the G.I. Joe releases, and were therefore primarily US weaponry. A vast array of small and heavy weapons were produced and marketed in this manner for the Action Man line.

Examples such as the Emergency Highway were sold in the late seventies and early eighties. They were mostly priced to be affordable for children to purchase with their pocket money. Details that varied over the course of time were trademark stamping, colouration and straps; earlier items had elastic straps, later issues had plastic.

=== Vehicles ===
Among the larger accessories produced for Action Man were versions, not to true 1/6 scale, of current British Army equipment: the Scorpion tank which is the exception in being very true to scale, Spartan armoured personnel carrier, Ferret armoured car, the 105 mm Light Gun, Airportable Land Rover and trailer. A German Sd. Kfz. 222 armoured car was made, albeit with a larger gun than in reality.

There was a Fire Tender, DUKW, a VTOL "Pursuit" aircraft, Army Helicopter "Capture Helicopter", backpack Helicopter, "Skyhawk" hang glider, Motorcycle with Sidecar, another true to scale offering; "Power-Hog", Police motorcycle, Submarine, Multi-terrain vehicle, Jeep, and a Trailer. Other large sets included a Training tower with zip line and the Mobile operations HQ. There was a replica rigid inflatable boat with a battery-powered outboard engine. A Space capsule was produced in 1970, though Great Britain had no crewed spaceflight programme.

== Film ==
In 2012, film studio Emmett/Furla/Oasis Films signed a deal to work on a cinematic feature-length live-action film adaptation of Action Man with Hasbro Studios and its subsidiary company Allspark Pictures, along with other Hasbro properties such as the board games Monopoly, with Lionsgate, and Hungry Hungry Hippos. The expectation was that work on the first film, "Monopoly", would start in 2013. In 2018, Paramount Players said James Bobin will direct the film from Simon Farnaby's script.

In 2026, a new script by Simon Hatt and Anthony Sellitti would be developed at Working Title Films.

== Cultural impact ==
From 1980 onwards, each box proudly announced that Action Man was 'Toy of the decade' for the 1970s. In March 2018, Action Man appeared in an advert for Moneysupermarket.com.

During the 1980s to 1990s, the figure was made under licence in Spain under the merchandise trade name of "Geyperman".

== See also ==
- A.T.O.M, a spin-off of Action Man

== Bibliography ==
- Michlig, J. (1998) G.I. Joe; The Complete Story of America's Favorite Man of Action (ISBN 0-8118-1822-5)
- Baird, F. (1993) Action Man – The Gold Medal Doll for Boys 1966–1984 (ISBN 1-872727-36-0)
- Harrison, I. (2003) Action Man – The Official Dossier (ISBN 978-0007165506)
- Hall, A. (1999) Action Man – the ultimate collectors guide Vol. 1 (ISBN 1-901706-141)
- Hall, A. (1999) Action Man – the ultimate collectors guide Vol. 2 (ISBN 1-901706-29X)
- Hall, A. (1999) Action Man – the ultimate collectors guide Vol. 3 (ISBN 0-9536199-0-7)
- King, K. (2000) Action Man – the real story 1966–1996 (ISBN 0-9538870-0-6)
- Le Vexier, E.; Gavigniaux, H. trans.(2004) Action Joe – The Story of the French G.I. Joe (ISBN 2-915239-21-5
- Taylor, N.G. (2003) Action Man – On Land, At Sea, And in the Air (ISBN 1-872727-99-9)
- DePriest, D. (1999) "The Collectable G.I. Joe" (ISBN 0-7624-0536-8
