= Tommy Gun (disambiguation) =

Tommy Gun may refer to:

- Nickname for the Thompson submachine gun
- "Tommy Gun", 1978 song by The Clash
- "Tommy-Gun", 2010 single by Royal Republic
- Tommy Gun: How General Thompson's Submachine Gun Wrote History, 2009 book
- Shooting Star Tommy Gun, pneumatic arcade game machinegun

== See also ==
- Tommy Gunn (disambiguation)
