= Tommy Gunn =

Tommy Gunn may refer to:

- Tommy Gunn (character), a character from Rocky V
- Tommy Gunn (actor) (born 1967), American pornographic actor
- Tommy Gunn (toy), an action figure produced by Pedigree Toys Ltd
- Tommy Gunn (rapper), Thomas N. Rollins, Jr., who went by Megalon in the Monsta Island Czars

== See also ==
- Tommy gun, or Thompson submachine gun
- "Tommy Gun" (song)
- Tommy Gun (book)
