= Garand (disambiguation) =

The Garand is an American semi-automatic rifle.

Garand may also refer to:

== People with the name ==
- Dylan Garand (born 2002), Canadian ice hockey player
- John Garand (1888–1974), Canadian-American creator of the M1 Garand rifle
- Garou (singer) (Pierre Garand, born 1972), Canadian singer and actor

== Other uses ==
- Garand carbine, a predecessor of the M1 Garand rifle
