= Marlin Levermatic =

American rifle

The Marlin Levermatic was a family of lever-action rifles created by Marlin Firearms in the 1955. The Levermatic differed from the traditional lever-action rifles, such as the Marlin 39A, in that it employed a cam-and-roller system giving it an extremely smooth and short lever motion to reload a new cartridge.

This cam-and-roller system was originally invented by Kessler Arms Company for their "Lever-Matic" shotgun. Following Kessler's dissolution, Marlin licensed the idea and began producing rifles using a similar design.

The Marlin Model 56 was made between 1955 and 1964. There are no records to give a more exact date.

The firearm may not have a serial or production number as long guns were not required to have a serial numbers prior to the 1968 Gun Control Act, which went into effect January 1, 1969. Therefore, many manufacturers did not serialize their economy line of products.

Various internet sources and firearms forums relate the following information for dating the initial production of the Model 56:

- early 1955: steel receiver, 24" barrel with low serial numbers
- late 1955: steel receiver, 22" barrel without serial numbers
- 1956 to end of production: aluminum receiver, 22" barrel without serial numbers.

Marlin is known to have produced 7, 10 and 12 round magazines for the Model 56.

== Models ==
The Levermatic system was used in the following rifle models:

- Marlin 56: .22 LR, 7, 10, 12 round Box magazine (1955–1964)
- Sears 46c (Marlin 56): .22 Long Rifle, 7 round Box magazine (1956)
- Marlin 57: .22 LR, Tubular magazine (1959–1965)
- J. C. Higgins 44 DL (Marlin 57): .22 Long Rifle, Tubular magazine
- Western Auto Revelation model 115 (Marlin 57): .22 Long Rifle, Tubular magazine
- Marlin 57M: .22 Winchester Magnum Rimfire, Tubular magazine (1959–1969)
- J. C. Higgins 44 DLM (Marlin 57m): .22 Winchester Magnum Rimfire, Tubular magazine
- Marlin 62: .256 Winchester Magnum and .30 Carbine, 4 round Box magazine(1963–1969)

=== Planned models ===
Marlin had also planned to produce the Levermatic in .357 Magnum and .22 Remington Jet offered in the Marlin model 62. Both cartridges are related to the .256 Magnum which shared the same .357 Magnum parent case, but these options never materialized.

== Sources ==
- Fryxell, Glen E. Marlin's Microgroove Barrels
- Malloy, John. Marlin’s Levermatic Rifle Line Offered Untraditional Design. New Gun Week, Vol. 40 Issue 1811 - Jan. 1. 2005.
