= Thompson Light Rifle =

- Type: Carbine
- Place of origin: United States

Production history
- Designed: 1941
- Manufacturer: Auto Ordnance
- Produced: Prototypes only

Specifications
- Cartridge: .30 Carbine
- Caliber: 7.62mm
- Action: Blowback, open bolt
- Rate of fire: 600–1200 rpm
- Feed system: 20 or 30 round box magazines
- Sights: Iron

The Thompson Light Rifle was an attempt by the Auto-Ordnance Company to manufacture a light rifle for the United States Armed Forces. The overall weapon was based on their well proven .45 ACP submachine gun. It worked well but due to the war effort was found expensive for mass production and its weight defied the concept of a light rifle.

Auto-Ordnance also submitted two other models not based on the Thompson SMG for tests in the .30 Carbine competitions in May and June 1941. Their first light rifle was a more conventional rifle with recoil-operated locked-breech action and weighed about 5.5 pounds. The modified version tested September, 1941 was semi-auto only, had 80 parts, and was found difficult to disassemble and reassemble.

== See also ==
- Tommy Gun: How General Thompson's Submachine Gun Wrote History
- List of U.S. Army weapons by supply catalog designation SNL A-32
- List of carbines

=== Similar firearms ===
- M2 Hyde
- M1944 Hyde Carbine
