= .30 carbine =

Light rifle cartridge for M1 carbine

.30 carbine (7.62×33mm)
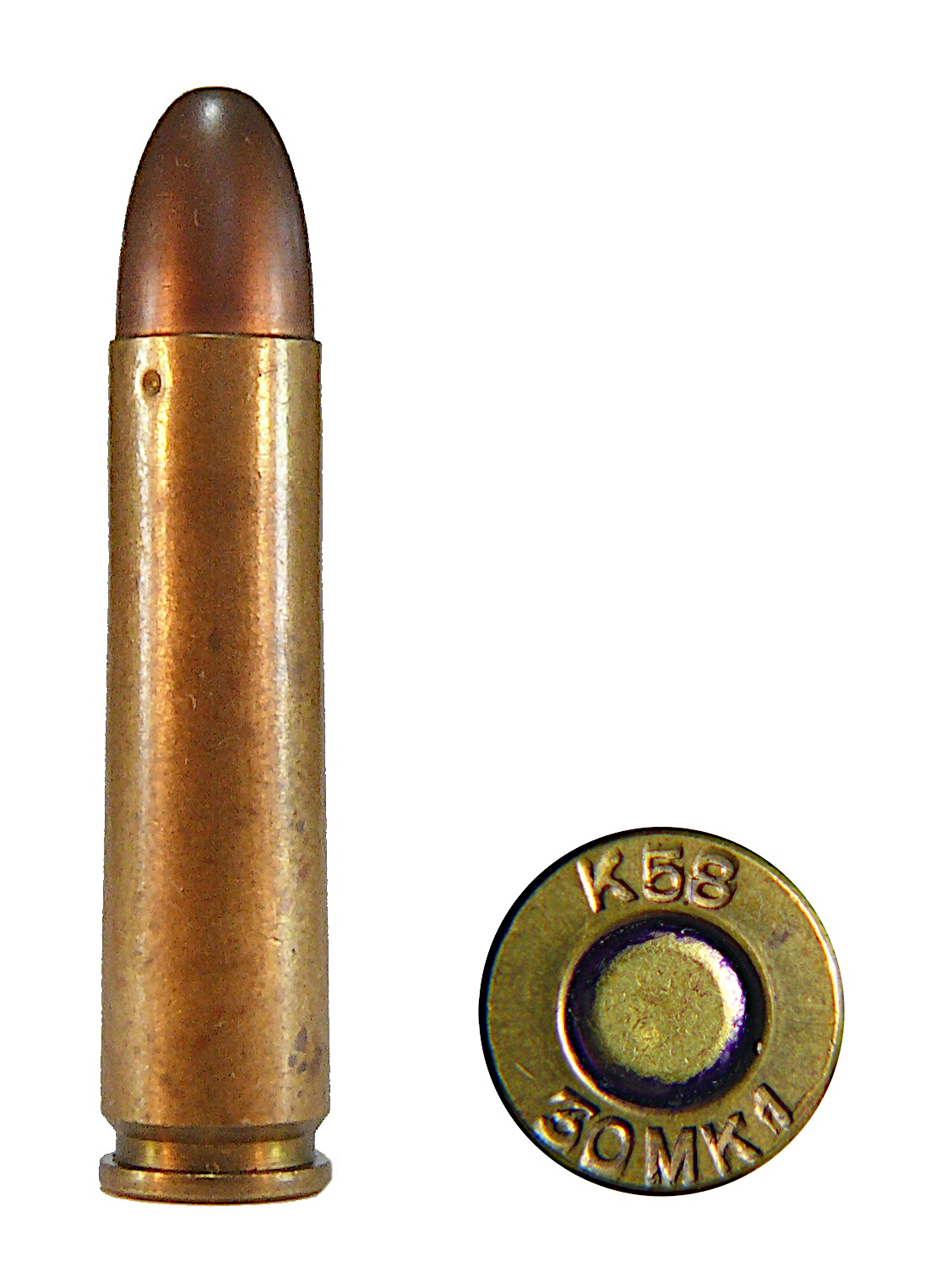
- Type: Carbine/Rifle
- Place of origin: United States

Service history
- In service: 1942–present
- Used by: See Users
- Wars: World War II; Korean War; First Indochina War; Vietnam War

Production history
- Produced: 1940s to 1950s, present (civilian)
- Variants: M1 (ball); M6 (grenade); M13 (dummy); M18 (heavy, high pressure test) 152 gr M27 (tracer)

Specifications
- Parent case: .32 Winchester Self-Loading
- Case type: Rimless, straight-walled
- Bullet diameter: .3078 in (7.82 mm)
- Land diameter: .3000 in (7.62 mm)
- Neck diameter: .3358 in (8.53 mm)
- Base diameter: .3567 in (9.06 mm)
- Rim diameter: .3600 in (9.14 mm)
- Rim thickness: .050 in (1.3 mm)
- Case length: 1.290 in (32.8 mm)
- Overall length: 1.680 in (42.7 mm)
- Case capacity: 21 gr H_{2}O (1.4 cm^{3})
- Rifling twist: 1 in 20 in (510 mm)
- Primer type: Small rifle
- Maximum pressure (SAAMI): 40,000
- Maximum pressure (C.I.P.): 46,410
- Maximum CUP: 40,000 CUP

Ballistic performance
Bullet mass/type	Velocity	Energy
110 gr (7 g) FMJ	579 m/s (1,900 ft/s)	1,195 J (881 ft⋅lbf)
- Test barrel length: 18 inches Source: Army Basic Field Manual FM 23-7

The .30 carbine (7.62×33mm) is a centrefire cartridge that is used in the M1 carbine that was introduced in the 1940s. It is a light rifle round designed to be fired from the M1 carbine's 18-inch (458 mm) barrel.

== History ==
Shortly before World War II, the U.S. Army started a "light rifle" project to provide support personnel and rear area units a weapon with more firepower and accuracy than the standard issue M1911A1 .45 ACP handgun and half the weight of the standard issue M1 Garand .30-06 rifle or the .45 ACP Thompson submachine gun.

The .30 carbine cartridge was developed by Winchester and is basically a rimless .30 caliber (7.62 mm) version of the much older .32 Winchester Self-Loading cartridge of 1906 introduced for the Winchester Model 1905 rifle. (The .30 carbine's relatively straight case and round nose bullet have misled some to believe it was designed for use in pistols.) The .30 carbine uses a lighter bullet (110 grain versus 165 grain) and improved powder. As a result, it has approximately 41% higher muzzle velocity with 27% more impact energy than the parent .32 WSL cartridge.

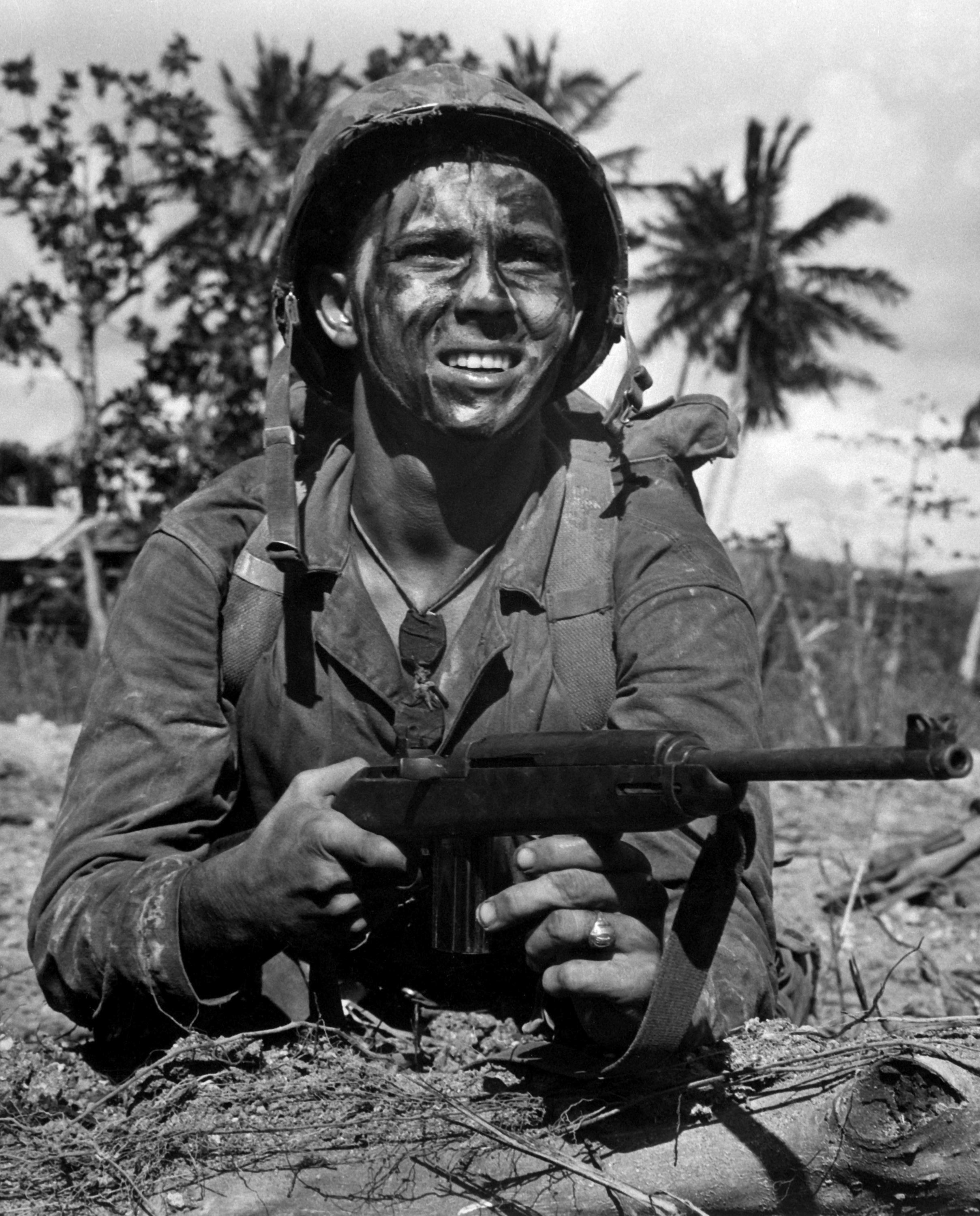
Marine with M1 carbine at Guam

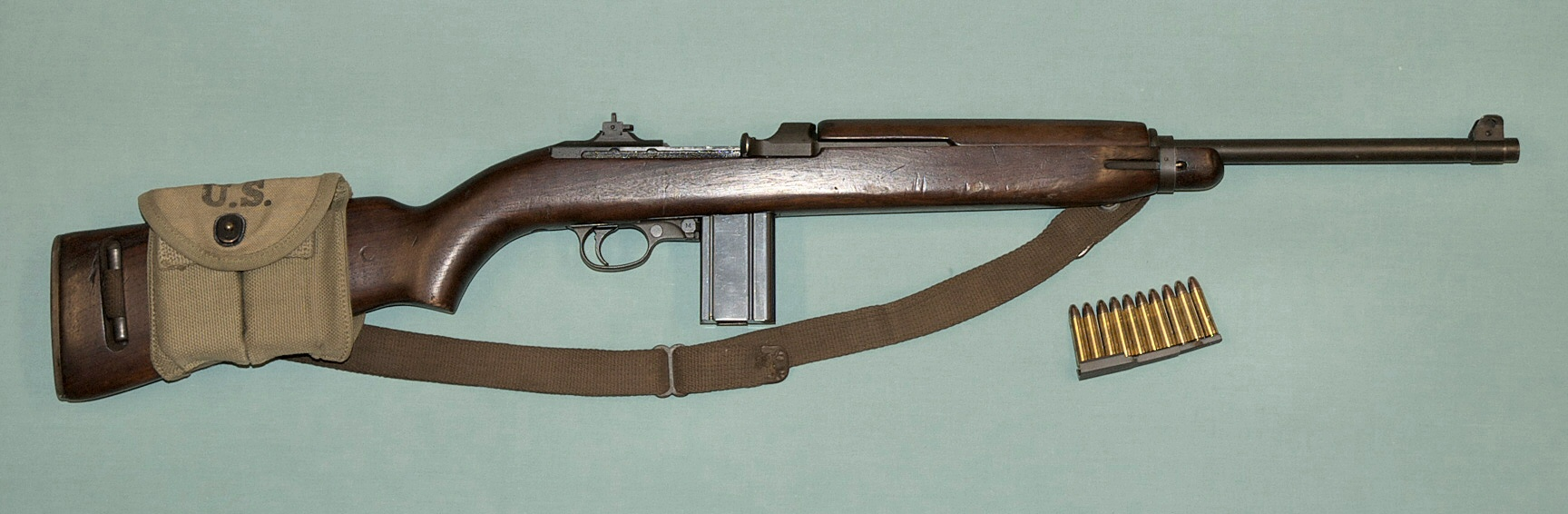
WW II M1 carbine with a magazine pouch mounted on the stock that held two spare 15-round magazines and 10 .30 carbine rounds on a stripper clip

At first, Winchester was tasked with developing the cartridge but did not submit a carbine design. Other firms and individual designers submitted several carbine designs, but most prototypes were either unreliable or grossly off the target weight of five pounds. Army Ordnance Major Rene Studler persuaded Winchester that the Winchester M2 .30-06 rifle, a design started by Ed Browning and perfected by Winchester engineers including Marshall "Carbine" Williams, could be scaled down for the .30 carbine cartridge. The result was the M1 carbine.

The M1 carbine was issued to infantry officers; machine gun, artillery and tank crews; paratroopers; and other line-of-communications personnel in lieu of the larger, heavier M1 Garand. Cavalry Reconnaissance units were primarily armed with the carbine. The weapon was originally issued with a 15-round detachable magazine. The carbine and cartridge were not intended to serve as a primary infantry weapon, nor was it comparable to more powerful intermediate cartridges later developed for assault rifles. The M2 carbine was introduced late in World War II with a selective-fire switch allowing optional fully automatic fire at a rather high rate (850–900 rpm) and a 30-round magazine.

The M1 and M2 carbines continued in service during the Korean War. A postwar U.S. Army evaluation reported that "[t]here are practically no data bearing on the accuracy of the carbine at ranges in excess of 50 yards. The record contains a few examples of carbine-aimed fire felling an enemy soldier at this distance or perhaps a little more. But they are so few in number that no general conclusion can be drawn from them. Where carbine fire had proven killing effect, approximately 95 percent of the time the target was dropped at less than 50 yards." The evaluation also reported that "[c]ommanders noted that it took two to three engagements at least to settle their men to the automatic feature of the carbine so that they would not greatly waste ammunition under the first impulse of engagement. By experience, they would come to handle it semiautomatically, but it took prolonged battle hardening to bring about this adjustment in the human equation."

== Development ==
U.S. Army specifications for the new cartridge mandated the caliber to be greater than .27, with an effective range of 300 yards or more, and a midrange trajectory ordinate of 18 inches (460 mm) or less at 300 yards. With these requirements in hand, Winchester's Edwin Pugsley chose to design the cartridge with a .30 caliber, 100–120 grain bullet at a velocity of 2,000 feet per second (610 m/s). The first cartridges were made by turning down rims on .32SL cases and loading with .308 caliber bullets which had a similar profile to those of the U.S. military .45 ACP bullets. The first 100,000 cartridges manufactured were headstamped ".30 SL" (for "self-loading").

== Civilian use ==
The popularity of the M1 carbine for collecting, sporting, and re-enactment use has resulted in continued civilian popularity of the .30 carbine cartridge. For hunting, it is considered a small-to-medium-game cartridge.

== Handguns ==
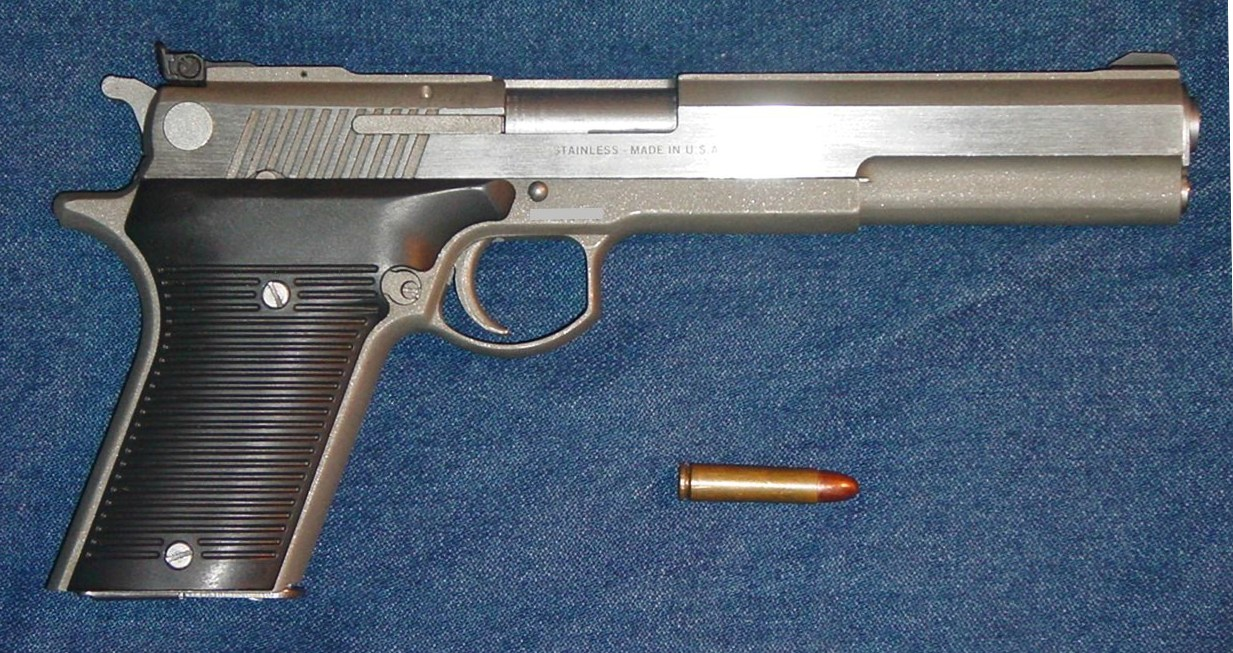
Automag III .30 carbine pistol made by Irwindale Arms, Inc. with .30 carbine cartridge

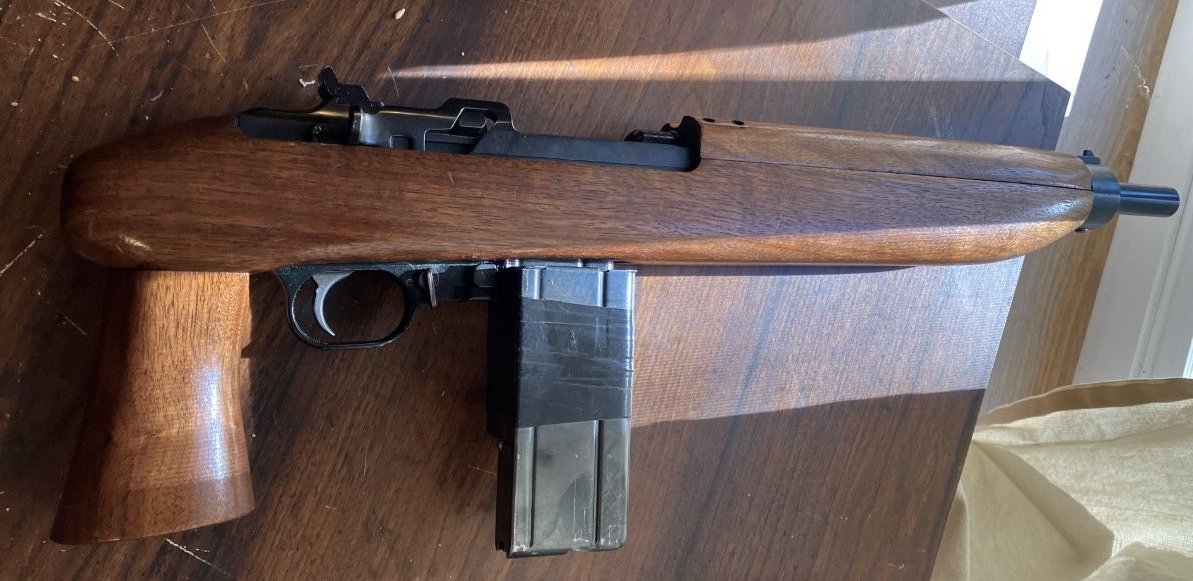
Universal Enforcer in .30 carbine

A number of handguns have been chambered for .30 carbine ammunition. In 1944, Smith & Wesson developed a hand-ejector revolver to fire .30 carbine. It went through 1,232 rounds without incident. From a four-inch (102 mm) barrel, it launched the standard GI ball projectile at 1,277 ft/s (389 m/s), producing an average group of 4.18 inches (106 mm) at 25 yards (23 m); the military decided not to adopt the revolver. The loud blast is the most oft-mentioned characteristic of the .30 carbine cartridge when fired in a handgun.

In 1958, the short-lived J. Kimball Arms Co. produced a .30 carbine caliber pistol that closely resembled a slightly scaled-up High Standard Field King .22 target pistol. The Ruger Blackhawk revolver chambered for the .30 carbine round has been in the catalogs since the late 1960s. Standard government-issue rounds reach over 1,500 ft/s (460 m/s), with factory loads, and handloads producing similar velocities or tuned for more efficient short-barrel performance without excessive blast.

Plainfield Machine Corp. made a .30 caliber pistol from 1964 to 1983 named the "Enforcer". While similar to the M1 carbine, it lacked the stock, thereby making it a handgun. Sold to Iver Johnson in 1983, the Enforcer continued in production until 1986. Other handguns chambered for this cartridge include the Thompson-Center Contender.

Plainfield Machine produced M1 carbines from 1960 to 1977, when they were bought out by Iver Johnson Corp, who has manufactured them at least until a 50th anniversary model in 1993. The Taurus Raging Thirty and AMT AutoMag III were also offered in .30 carbine.

== Comparison ==
The .30 carbine was developed from the .32 Winchester Self-Loading used in an early semi-auto sporting rifle. A standard .30 carbine ball bullet weighs 110 grains (7.1 g); a complete loaded round weighs 195 grains (12.6 g) and has a muzzle velocity of 1,990 ft/s (610 m/s), giving it 967 ft⋅lb_{f} (1,311 joules) of energy when fired from the M1 carbine's 18-inch barrel.

By comparison, the .30-06 M2 cartridge for M1 Garand rifle fired a ball bullet weighing 152 grains (9.8 g) at a muzzle velocity of 2,805 ft/s (855 m/s) and 2,655 ft⋅lb_{f} (3,600 joules) of muzzle energy. Therefore, the M1 carbine is significantly less powerful than the M1 Garand. Another comparison is a .357 Magnum cartridge fired from an 18" rifle barrel, which has a muzzle velocity range from about 1,718–2,092 ft/s (524–638 m/s) with energies at 720–1,215 ft⋅lb_{f} (976–1,647 J) for a 110 gr (7.1 g) bullet at the low end and a 125 gr (8.1 g) bullet on the high end.

== Chambered firearms ==
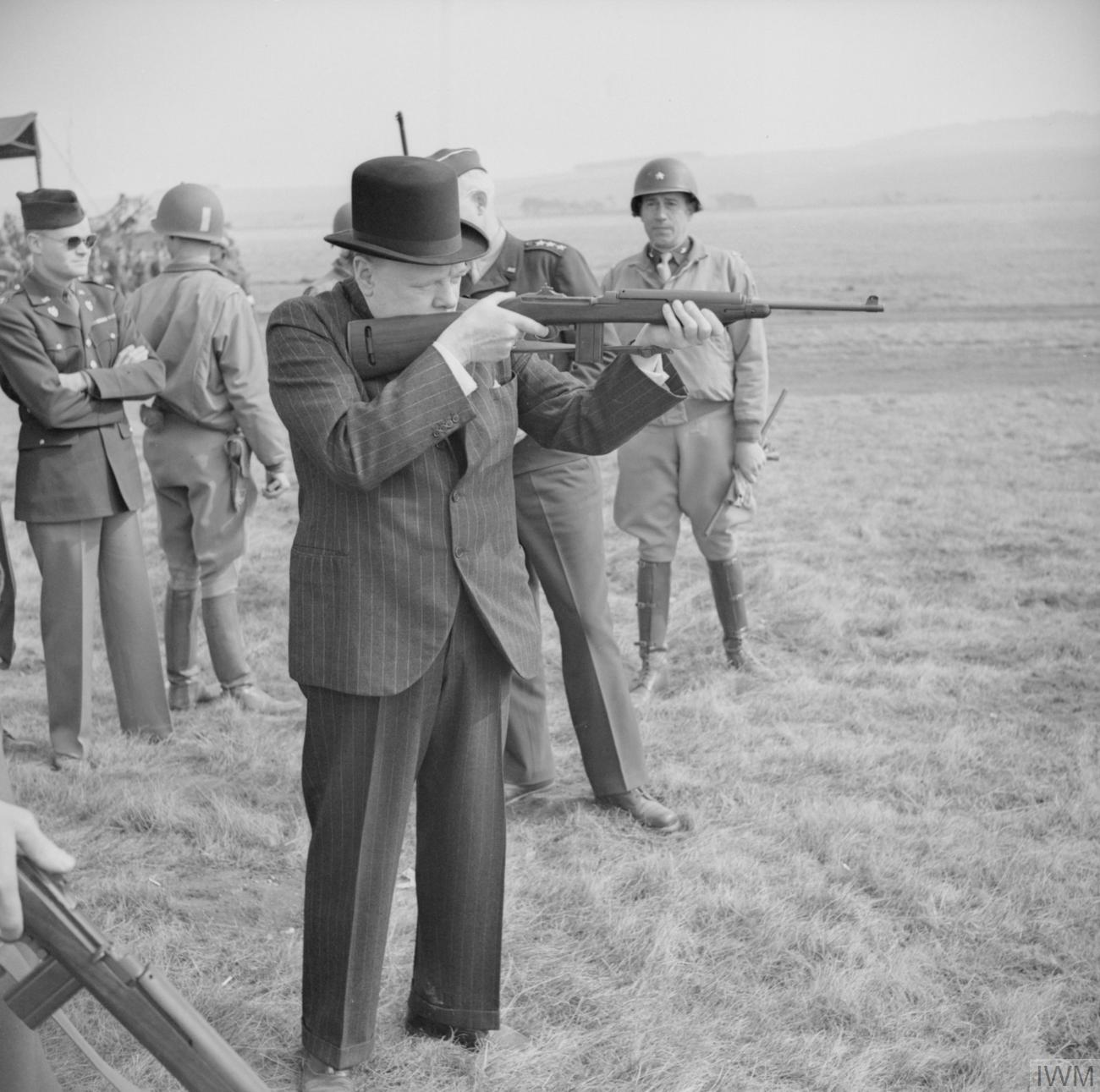
Winston Churchill fires an M1 carbine during a visit to the US 2nd Armored Division on Salisbury Plain, 23 March 1944

=== Rifles / Carbines ===
- Alpine u.s. carbine
- Armalon AL30C
- BSA Machine Carbine
- CEAM Modèle 1950
- Chapina carbine
- Cristobal carbine
- Excel Arms X30R
- FAMAE CT-30
- FN .30 Carbine
- Franchi LF-58
- Garand carbine
- Hezi SM-1
- Hillberg carbine
- IMI Magal
- M1 carbine
- M2 carbine
- M1944 Hyde carbine
- Marlin Levermatic Model 62
- PAWS ZX
- Southern Gun Company La-30
- T29
- Taurus Carabina CT-30
- Thompson Light Rifle
- Woodhull light rifle
- Universal Arms .30 carbine
- Victor Sarasqueta 1953 STABLE/ARMU

=== Handguns ===
Inland Advisor pistol in .30 carbine

- AMT AutoMag III
- Excel Arms X-30
- Inland Manufacturing M30-P pistol
- Kimball (standard, target, aircrew)
- Ruger Blackhawk
- Taurus Raging Thirty
- Iver Johnson Enforcer
- Universal Enforcer

== Users ==
- Austria (1950s–1970s, Austrian Army and police)
- Bavaria (1940s–1950s, border guard)
- Brazil (present, BOPE, PMESP)
- Cambodia (1967–1975)
- Colombia Korean War through the 1950s
- Cuba Used by Fidel Castro's 26th of July Movement during the Cuban Revolution (1953–1959)
- Dominican Republic (1950–1990)
- Ethiopia
- France WWII lend-lease, First Indochina War and (1954–1962, Algerian War). Manufactured as the Modèle 50 pour Carabine cartridge.
- Germany (German border guard, some police forces and German Army paratroopers (1950s-1960s)) Manufactured as the 7.62mm Kurz (7.62K) cartridge.
- Greece (Hellenic (Greek) Air Force until mid-1980s)
- Indonesia: Used by Indonesian Armed Forces in 1950s-1960s
- Israel (1945–1957, Israeli Defence Forces; 1970s–present, Israeli Police; 1974–present, civil guard)
- Italy (Carabinieri, as of 1992)
- Japan (National police reserve) (1950–1989)
- Liberia
- Malaysia
- Mexico (Police departments and security forces)
- Netherlands (1940s–1970s, army and police)
- Nicaragua (1960s-present, police and border guard)
- Norway (Norwegian Army 1951–1970, with some Norwegian police units until the 1990s)
- Philippines (Post-WWII)
- South Korea (1950s–present, reserve force)
- Suriname (?–present, army)
- South Vietnam (1950s–1970s)
- Taiwan (Republic of China) (1950s–present)
- Thailand Locally known as the ปสบ.87
- United Kingdom WWII Lend-Lease
- United States (1940s–1970s, armed forces) and some law enforcement agencies (1940s–present)
- Vietnam (Captured batches)

== Cartridge types ==
Common types used by the military with the carbine include:

- Cartridge, caliber .30, carbine, ball, M1 - It originally came in cartons of 45 cartridges, divided into three fold-out sections of 15 rounds. The M1 carbine had a magazine that contained exactly 15 rounds, so this prevented wastage or loss. It was changed to 50 rounds in 1942 to maximize the amount of ammo delivered.
- Cartridge, caliber .30, carbine, grenade, M6 [Crimped case] - The grenade blank was used with the M8 rifle grenade launcher. It came in individual-issue cartons of six cartridges or full cartons of 50 cartridges. The large cartons were made of plain chipboard and were bulk-packed in terneplate-lined wooden packing crates (later in metal "spam cans" from 1944). Individual-issue cartons were originally sealed and waterproofed with a wax coating and then packed in rifle grenade crates. This was found to be ineffective, as the seal would get broken in handling and compromise the contents to salt air and moisture. It was later replaced with a heat-sealed foil-lined kraftpaper wrapping.
  From 1944 the M13 metal "spam can" was introduced. It was packed with an assortment of an individual six-round carton of Carbine Grenade blanks M6, a 10-round carton of .30-06 Springfield Rifle Grenade blanks M3, and a five-round packet of Grenade Auxiliary M7 cartridges.
- Cartridge, dummy, caliber .30, carbine, M13 - The cartridge had one hole drilled through the case and had no primer. It came in cartons of 50 cartridges. It was used to safely teach loading and unloading the M1 carbine to recruits.
- Cartridge, caliber .30, carbine, ball, high pressure test, M18 [Tin-plated cartridge case] - This cartridge used the same spitzer-type bullet as the .30-06 Ball M2. It came in cartons of 50 rounds. First introduced in 1942, it was used to proof the carbine and its components at the factory or an army arsenal. The tinned case was adopted in 1943 to prevent its confusion with standard Ball ammunition.
- Cartridge, caliber .30, carbine, Tracer, M16 [Red-tipped bullet] - It came in cartons of 50 cartridges. Commissioned by the British government in 1943 for use in the jungles of Asia. Designed and developed by Remington (as cartridge T24), then made by Remington (standard black-lettered cartons) and Lake City (red-lettered cartons to indicate Tracer ammo). It was bright out to a range of 400 yards. The tracer was found to ignite underbrush and cause fires, so it was replaced by a new formulation (cartridge M27).
- Cartridge, caliber .30, carbine, dim-bright Tracer, M27 [Orange-tipped bullet] - It came in cartons of 50 cartridges. The tracer was dim to a range of 75 yards and then bright out to 600 yards. Developed as cartridge T43 in 1944, standardized as M27 in 1946.
- 7,62mm Kurz [German > "Short"] - The NATO designation for .30 carbine ball M1 ammunition. It was first issued to the West German police forces and the auxiliaries in the Western Occupied Zones of Berlin, explaining its German-language designation. France used ammunition with this designation in Algeria.

== Synonyms ==
- .30 M1 carbine
- 7.62×33mm
- .30 SL (self-loading)

== As a parent case ==
The .30 carbine cartridge was the basis for Melvin M. Johnson's "MMJ 5.7" cartridge, colloquially called the .22 Spitfire (5.7x33mm) after what Col Johnson named his rebarreled or relined and rechambered Carbines. By necking the .30 carbine's case down to a .224 caliber bullet and basing the cartridge ballistics around those of the .22 Hornet, he was attempting to improve the effective range of the M1 carbine while reducing recoil and "muzzle rise". The Plainfield Machine Company (later taken over by Iver Johnson's Arms) sold a sporting rifle copy of the M1 carbine chambered for this cartridge but only about 500 were made.

== See also ==
- 7 mm caliber
- 7.62 mm caliber
- List of handgun cartridges
- List of rifle cartridges
- Table of handgun and rifle cartridges
