= Geyperman =

Spanish action figure

Geyper Man
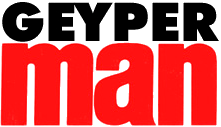
- Product type: Action figure
- Current owner: Hasbro
- Produced by: Geyper (Note: The "Geyper" name was an acronym from GE (honoring the founder's uncle to encouraged him to start a business), and PERez (Antonio Pérez Sánchez).)
- Country: Spain
- Introduced: 1975
- Discontinued: 1982; 44 years ago
- Related brands: G.I. Joe
- Previous owners: Palitoy

Geyperman was the name of a Spanish action figure manufactured by the company Geyper during the 1970s. In 1964, Hasbro toy company's first "action figure" was introduced with the name of G.I. Joe. They were 12" tall and represented the four branches of the military: Army, Navy, Air Force & Marines. The toyline was dedicated to one character named G.I. Joe and later on, the line featured vehicles, accessories, talking soldiers and six foreign soldiers.

Geyper, although a Hasbro licensee, used Palitoy's product line as the basis for their outfits. The figure itself was a combination of various Hasbro molds, using talker style torsos (screwed together, rather than a single mold). The first version had the head of the first G.I. Joe figures, with flocked hair, with or without beard, and was available from 1976 to 1979. Later, the Eagle-Eye head mold with fixed eyes was released in Spain only. This was the transitional model and was available from 1978 to 1980, with flocked hair and no beard, and the colour of the skin is lighter than the model of second wave 1980–1982, which was darker and came with or without beard, and a body that didn't have the inscriptions Geyper (made in Spain), which the previous models had.

The last geyperman was made it by Spanish companie Bizak 2002_2005.

== Packaging ==
There are a few examples of Geyperman packages; one can see from the Radio BackPack comparison that even the logo was inspired directly by Palitoy's "Action Man". They also included a "star" scheme similar to Action Man, for mail-in equipment/figure offers.

=== Closed box ===
In most cases, closed box packages included a photo of the item in use, but some like the radio, used painted artwork to display the item.

=== Window box ===
This type of packaging is very close to that used by both Palitoy and Hasbro, for Action Man and G.I. Joe respectively. The graphics were usually original Hasbro artwork, modified in some instances. This type of packaging was ideal in terms of the child seeing exactly what he would receive.

=== Uniform box artwork ===
The outfit box artwork was almost identical to that of Palitoy's line. The following are uniform set graphics, attached to the left side of the box. The box itself was the same format as the sabotage set; black frame, with yellow carding & blister pack to retain items. The back of the box illustrated the range of outfits and accessories offered for sale by Geyper.

=== Small outfit sets ===
Geyper also offered outfits in a smaller package, with the items enclosed in a plastic bag inside a closed box. The Cowboy and "Indian" (Native American) sets are examples of this type. The back of the packages have photo illustrations of the other; Cowboy shows native American, and vice versa.

=== Accessory cards ===
Geyper offered budget carded accessory packs containing just a few items to augment one's collection at a reasonable price for children to afford themselves. The back of the card illustrated other items or outfits offered by Geyper.

The original 12-inch G.I. Joe was licensed to several countries:

- to the Spanish company Geyper appearing as "Geyperman" in the 70s
- to the UK company Palitoy, appearing as "Action Man" in the 60s
- in Germany as "Action Team" in the 70s
- in France as "Group Action Joe" 1976–81
- in Brazil as "Falcon" from Estrella in the 70s (and again in the 90s)
- in Japan as "GIJOE" and "Combat Man" from Takara (Hasbro Licensee) in the 60s
- also in Japan from Tsukuda (Palitoy sub-licensee)

The nineties Action Man was released by Hasbro International for the European market in uniform packaging, no longer licensed to individual companies.

== See also ==
- Airgamboys
- Action Man
- G.I. Joe

== Bibliography ==
- DePriest, D. (1999) "The Collectable G.I. Joe" (ISBN 0-7624-0536-8)
