= Pippa (doll) =

British fashion doll of the 1970s

Pippa dolls Jasmine, Gail, and Penny

Pippa are "pocket-sized" fashion dolls produced by British toymaker Palitoy. They were introduced in 1972 and were manufactured until 1980. Pippa was a 6 inch doll with blonde hair, and an articulated neck, shoulders, hips and knees. Her design was based on Topper's range of Dawn dolls. Employing subtle makeover techniques and fashion variations, Palitoy was able to produce over 30 different Pippa and Friends by using only three head moulds, different coloured vinyls and hair styles. Pippa had several friends, fashions, accessories, and furniture.

Pippa was branded as "the pocket money fashion doll that puts fashion in your pocket". The doll's size meant she could be carried with ease or put inside a pocket. She was marketed towards girls of seven to eleven. Palitoy felt that Pippa's inexpensive outfits and accessories would give them a range of "pocket-money" items of their own. The small stature of the doll meant that production costs were generally lower than market competitors such as Sindy and Barbie.

The Pippa doll had many different fashionable clothing pieces, including trouser suits, beachwear, miniskirts, minidresses and top and bottom combos. There were also more regal, formal dresses, and outfits relating to different jobs. Pippa's clothes were made in Palitoy's Coalville factory, where up to 100,000 pieces of one style were made at a time.

Pippa's first three friends launched in 1972 were Marie, Tammie and Britt. To reflect Britain's increasingly diverse ethnic population Pippa later had an Asian friend named Jasmine and a black friend named Mandy. More friends like Gail, Emma, Rosemary and Penny, and a boyfriend Pete, were also added to the line. As the dolls were the same size as Pippa, they were able to wear her many fashions. The 1974 "Princess Pippa" became a popular doll from the series. She was a "deluxe" dancing version of the doll with ankle-length hair and dressed in a ball gown.
