= Iver Johnson Enforcer =

- Iver Johnson Enforcer
- Type: Semi-automatic pistol, machine-pistol
- Place of origin: United States

Service history
- Wars: Vietnam War (Limited use by special forces.)

Production history
- Manufacturer: Iver Johnson
- Produced: 1978–1993

Specifications
- Mass: 5½ lbs
- Barrel length: 9½"
- Cartridge: .30 carbine 9mm Luger
- Action: Gas-operated (short-stroke piston), rotating bolt
- Feed system: 5-, 15- or 30-round detachable box magazine (standard), 10-, 40-round box magazines, 50-round drum (aftermarket)
- Sights: Rear sight: aperture; L-type flip or adjustable; Front sight: wing-protected post

The Iver Johnson Enforcer is pistol derivative of the M1 carbine, produced in .30 carbine, and built by Iver Johnson. Mechanically, the pistol is identical to an M1 carbine and feeds from the same magazines. However, the barrel is significantly shorter and there is a pistol grip in lieu of a stock. As the firearm has no shoulder stock, it is classed as a "handgun" under US law. The pistols feature walnut stocks and in a blued (PP30) or stainless (PP30S) finish. Some were produced in 9mm Luger (PP9).

A small number of Enforcers feature an M2-style selector switch and are therefore a "machine-gun" under the US National Firearms Act. An experimental machine-pistol version in 9mm Luger was produced (MP9).

While the Enforcer is legal in most states and territories in the US, it is a prohibited weapon in Canada.

== Criminal use ==
The Enforcer is seen prominently wielded by Patty Hearst in a bank robbery committed by the Symbionese Liberation Army.
