= Ruger Hawkeye =

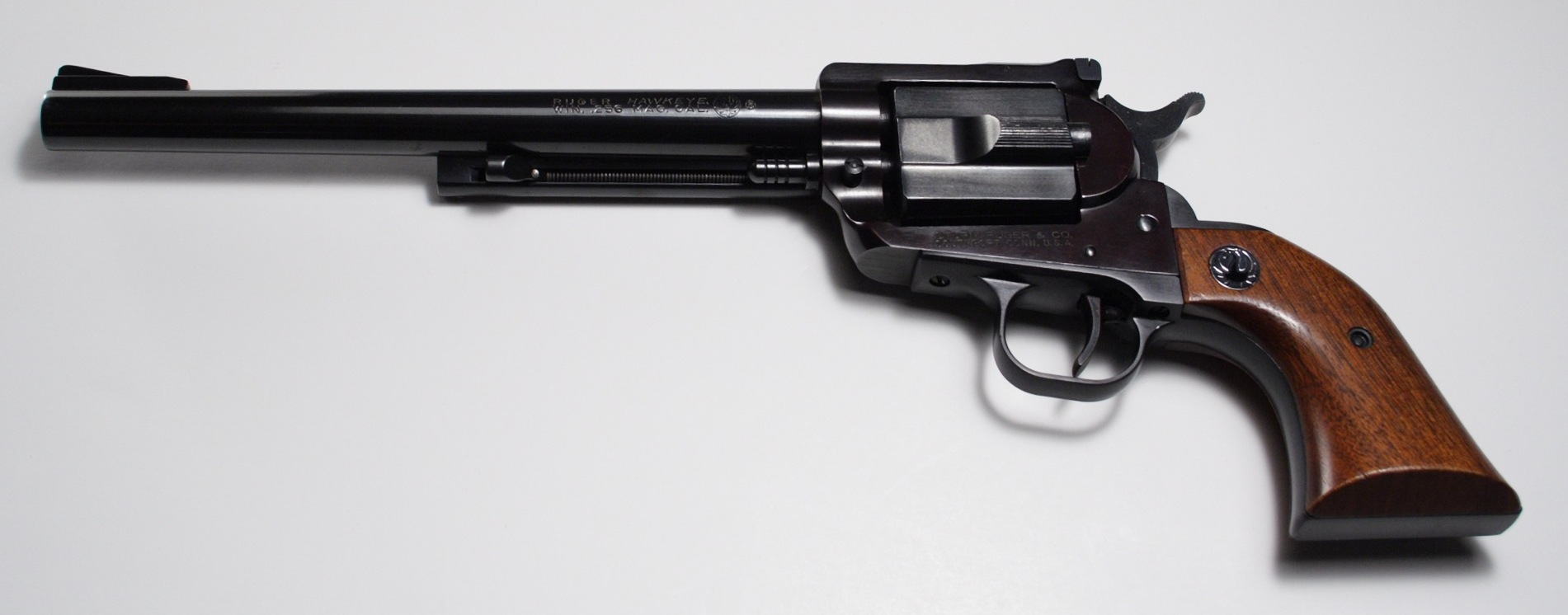
- Type: Single-shot pistol
- Place of origin: United States

Production history
- Manufacturer: Sturm, Ruger & Co.
- Unit cost: $87.50 (equivalent to $899 in 2024)
- Produced: 1963–1964
- No. built: 3075

Specifications
- Mass: 45 ounces (1,300 g)
- Length: 14.5 inches (370 mm)
- Barrel length: 8.5 inches (220 mm)
- Cartridge: .256 Winchester Magnum
- Feed system: Single shot, swiveling breechblock
- Sights: Adjustable target iron sights. Barrel drilled and tapped for scope mounting.

The Ruger Hawkeye is a single-shot pistol chambered for the .256 Winchester Magnum cartridge, produced by Sturm, Ruger & Co. from 1963 until July 1964. It was built on the same frame as the Ruger Blackhawk, but rather than having a rotating cylinder like a standard revolver, it featured a swiveling breechblock which allowed an individual round to be loaded and sealed into the frame.

The Ruger Hawkeye pistol was not a commercial success, and was discontinued after only 3,075 were produced.

== Sources ==
- Larry Kelly, J. D. Jones. Hunting for Handgunners. Book Sales, 1990. ISBN 978-0-87349-109-9.
