= Pedigree Dolls & Toys =

English toy company

Pedigree Toys & Brands Limited
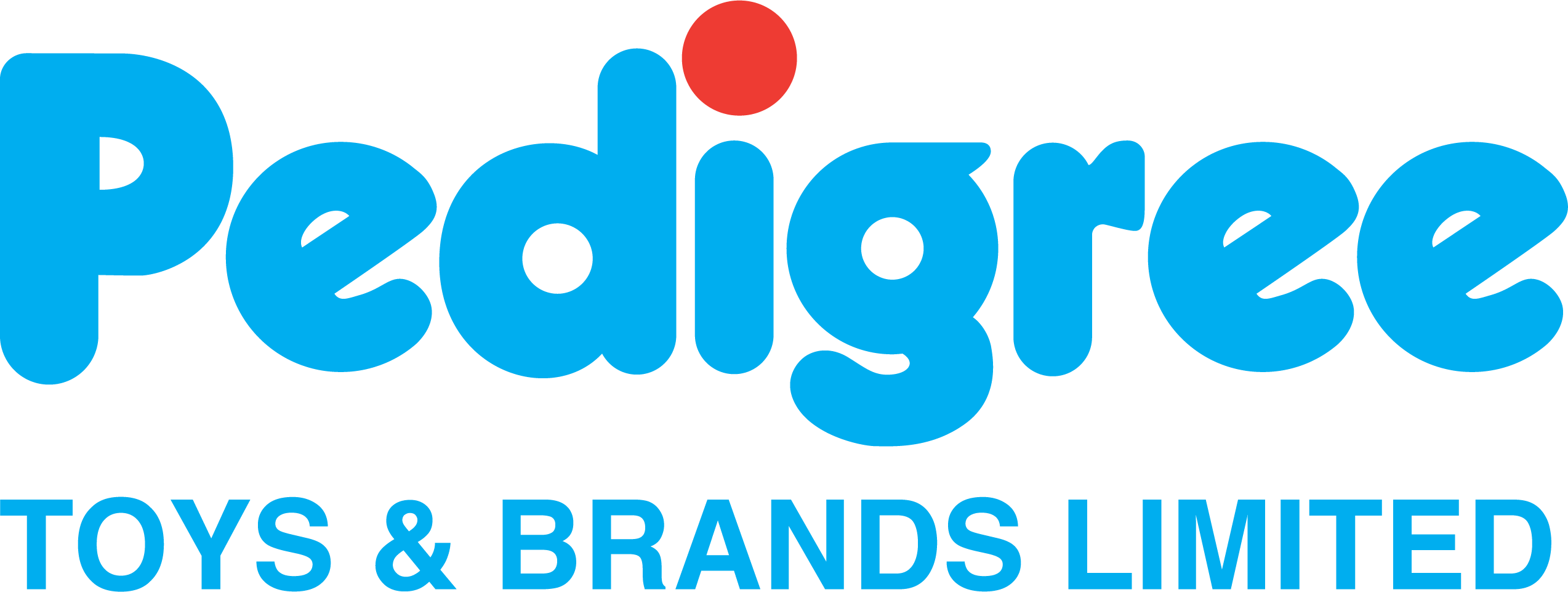
- Type: Limited
- Founded: 1930`s
- Headquarters: Exeter, United Kingdom
- Key people: Jerry Reynolds (CEO)
- Products: Dolls, action figures
- Brands: Sindy; Tommy Gunn
- Parent: Lines Bros; Dunbee-Combex-Marx
- Website: www.pedigreetoysandbrands.co.uk

Pedigree Toys & Brands Limited (formerly, Pedigree Dolls & Toys), is a manufacturing company located in Exeter, England. Best known for launching the Sindy doll in 1963, Pedigree also produced the Tommy Gunn action figure from 1966 to 1968. The Sindy doll was very popular from the 1960s to 1980s, and accounted for 80% of Pedigree's sales.

== History ==
Pedigree was a subsidiary of Lines Bros, then became a subsidiary of Dunbee-Combex-Marx. After Dunbee's collapse in 1980, Pedigree and several other Dunbee subsidiaries moved to the holding company Tamwade.

In March 1982, Pedigree closed its factory in Wellingborough, Northamptonshire. After running at a loss in 1985, it was rumoured that Tonka and Hasbro were preparing takeover bids for Pedigree, which did not eventuate.

Instead, Hasbro bought the rights to the Sindy doll in 1986, but returned the rights to Pedigree in 1998 after sales of the doll declined. Sindy was licensed to Vivid Imaginations, who relaunched the doll in 1999.

== See also ==
- Golden Bear Toys
- Tonner Doll Company
