= Kitty in My Pocket =

Collection of toy figures released by Vivid Imaginations

Logo for the Just Play release

Kitty in My Pocket is a collection of small toy cat figurines that was first released in 1994 by Vivid Imaginations. As well the toys being sold individually in blind packets they were also sold in blister-packaged groups and large playsets. In 2007 the line was re-released by Corinthian Marketing/MEG Toys with the same concept but with different designs for the cats. In 2009 the Kitty in My Pocket line was discontinued, yet again. In 2015, a company called Just Play re-released the line. As before the toys were sold in individual blind bags and in playsets.

During the late 1990s, the line - as well as the other "in My Pocket" toy lines - combined with the BBC Television programme Animal Hospital and the animal charity RSPCA to create animals that came with "injuries" (a paint that turned red in cold water). Eventually the original "in My Pocket" lines disappeared and fully merged with the Animal Hospital brand name.

== Vivid Imaginations ==
The first generation of toys were initially released in individual blind packets. Later releases came in blister packs containing multiple figures. Family group figures were also released that came with a mother cat, kittens and a basket. A play set was also released that consisted of a large plastic house that folded out and contained accessories.

Two later variations on the line, "Love 'n' Sparkle" (cats that came with glittery stickers) and "Animal Hospital" (cats that had "injuries" that turned red in cold water), returned the blind packet method of distribution as well as continuing blister pack issues. Another large play set house was released with the "Animal Hospital" theme.

== Corinthian Marketing/MEG Toys ==
Logo for the Corinthian Marketing/MEG Toys release

The second generation of toys were released in 2007. They were available in blister packs with multiple figurines and in blind boxes that came with jelly beans and three figurines. The first blister-packaged releases came in jewellery sets called Fashion Packs. These had small figurines that could clip onto pieces of jewellery included with the set.

Later releases included family sets with a mother cat and four kittens.

== Just Play ==
The third generation was released in 2015. Just Play returned the individual blind packet distribution as well as clip-on sets and a clutch handbag playset that came with four figurines.
