= Mike Brogan =

British writer

Mike Brogan was a pseudonym used by successful children's comic strip author Fred Baker (d.2008). He wrote 10 novels between 1977 and 1979 published in the UK by Corgi Carousel (Originally by Aiden Ellis Publishing Ltd) featuring Action Man and his American friend G.I. Joe. Illustrations were by Mike Codd.

== Bibliography ==
The Action Man novels are:

- Snow Ice and Bullets - (July 1977) ISBN 9780856280634
- Hold the Bridge - (July 1977) ISBN 9780856280603
- The Taking of Monte Carrillo - (July 1977) ISBN 9780856280610
- Operation Skydrop - (July 1977) ISBN 9780856280627
- The Tough Way Out - (November 1977) ISBN 9780856280641
- Counter Attack! - (November 1977) ISBN 9780856280658
- The Spy Trap - (April 1978) ISBN 9780856280672
- Raid on Shuando - (May 1978) ISBN 9780856280665
- Not a Chance! - (March 1979) ISBN 9780856280689
- Abandon Ship! - (March 1979) ISBN 9780856280696
