= M1944 Hyde carbine =

Automatic Rifle

- Type: Automatic rifle / carbine
- Place of origin: United States

Production history
- Designer: George Hyde
- Designed: 1944
- Produced: prototypes only

Specifications
- Cartridge: .30 carbine
- Caliber: 7.62mm
- Action: Blowback, open bolt
- Rate of fire: 600–1200 rpm
- Feed system: 20/30 round box magazines
- Sights: Iron

The M1944 Hyde carbine was developed by George Hyde, designed to be a light rifle for the US Armed Forces. The weapon was based on the Thompson Submachine Gun, which Hyde drew inspiration from in many of his weapon designs.

An original .30 carbine based on the M1921/27 variants worked well. Due to the rising production during World War II, the initial design was too expensive for mass production, and its weight defied the concept of a 'Light Rifle'.

The M1944 Hyde carbine came with a quick barrel change device similar to the MG42. It used pressed steel components to ease production and reduce weight, making it versatile, reliable and easier to carry.

== Overview ==
The M1944 Hyde submachine gun came with an uncommon quick-change barrel system. The bolt is similar to the Solothurn MP-34, where the spring is contained within the buttstock.

Photos of the Hyde gun appeared in the first edition of The World’s Assault Rifles by Daniel Musgrave and Thomas B. Nelson, published in 1967. No known examples of the M1944 Hyde carbine remain in existence.

== Related equipment and accessories ==
=== Ammunition types ===
The ammunition used by the military with the carbine include:

- Cartridge, caliber .30, carbine, ball, M1
- Cartridge, grenade, caliber .30, M6 (also authorized for other blank firing uses, due to a lack of a dedicated blank cartridge)
- Cartridge, caliber .30, carbine, dummy, M13
- Cartridge, caliber .30, carbine, ball, test, high pressure, M18
- Cartridge, caliber .30, carbine, tracer, M16 (also rated as having an incendiary effect)
- Cartridge, caliber .30, carbine, tracer, M27 (dimmer illumination and no incendiary effect)

== See also ==
- List of carbines
- List of individual weapons of the U.S. Armed Forces
- List of U.S. Army weapons by supply catalog designation SNL B-28
- Carbine, Cal .30, M1A1 (based on Winchester M1 carbine)
- Thompson Light Rifle
