= Tommy Gunn (toy) =

British action figure

- Type: Action figures
- Invented by: Pedigree
- Company: Pedigree
- Country: United States
- Availability: 1966–68
- Materials: Plastic
- Features: British soldier

Tommy Gunn was an action figure of the mid-1960s depicting a British soldier, originally produced by Pedigree Toys. Andrew Stuttaford has called it the "British equivalent of G.I. Joe", a popular American action figure representing the armed forces.

== Description ==
The basic Tommy Gunn action figure depicted a British infantry soldier of the time complete with Sterling submachine gun, rather than a Thompson submachine gun (also known as a "Tommy gun"). It was also available in World War II combat gear carrying a 9-mm Sten gun.

The Tommy Gunn doll itself was described by the Halifax Evening Courier as "12in. high and fully jointed so that they can 'hold' a rifle, 'hurl' a grenade and generally behave like human soldiers." Changes of clothing included British Army uniforms for paratroopers, medical orderlies, and Trooping the Colour. The detail on the uniforms were said to be very accurate "down to their lace-up boots".

== Commercial history ==
Manufacturer Pedigree Doll Company started producing Tommy Gunn soldier and accessory packs for the UK market 1966, in an effort to capitalise on the popularity of G.I. Joe action figures in the US. They were marketed primarily as toys for British boys, but were also purchased by the British Army for use in recruiting demonstrations.

The soldier and accessory packs contained medal cards, which could be collected in a special album and redeemed for a free Tommy Gunn soldier, as part of a promotional offer which started in 1966. Twenty medal cards were required to receive the action figure. The "medal scheme" was scheduled to end after Christmas 1967, but was extended to June 1968 due to the popularity of the programme.

The Tommy Gunn action figure by Pedigree was in direct competition with Action Man by Palitoy, which was released the same year. Some observers predicted that Tommy Gunn would outsell Action Man in the UK due to its specifically British appeal; Action Man depicted an American soldier. In addition, the Tommy Gunn doll itself had a superior level of articulation compared to Action Man.

Nevertheless, Pedigree found it difficult to compete with Palitoy and ceased production of Tommy Gunn in 1968. Due to Palitoy's licensing deal with Hasbro, it was able to quickly import G.I. Joe outfits and accessories for sale in the UK. The two action figures and their elaborate accessory kits had taken up a lot of shelf space in a typical toy store. Once Pedigree exited, Action Man dominated the UK market for boys' dolls for more than a decade.

== Legacy ==
Pedigree Toys went on to use the body moulds for Tommy Gunn to make action figures of the characters from the TV series Captain Scarlet and the Mysterons and these sold well for a brief period. The original Tommy Gunn action figures themselves later became popular amongst colllectors, and are more valuable than Action Man due to their relative scarcity.

In 2006, manufacturer JAKKS Pacific signed a license agreement with MGM Products to roll out Tommy Gunn action figures.
