= Airgamboys =

Spanish brand of miniature figures

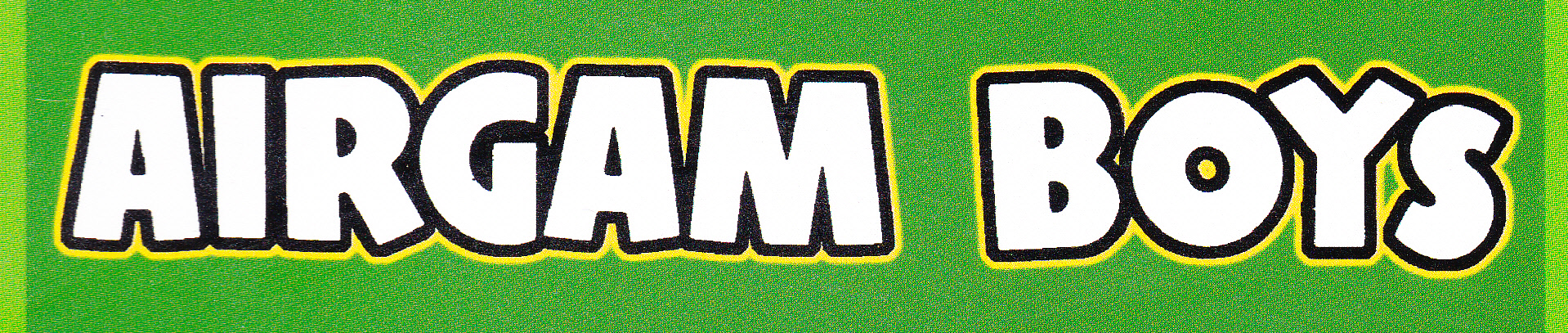
Airgamboys logo

Airgamboys is a Spanish brand of miniature figures, manufactured by the toy company Airgam since 1976. Similar to toys like Playmobil, Madelman, or Geyperman, Airgamboys consisted of various series, including:

- Soccer (Athletic Bilbao, Valencia CF, F.C. Barcelona, Real Madrid, Sevilla FC, Real Betis, Spanish National Team, English National Team, Argentina national team, Brazilian National Team, Stadium)
- Individual figures (Astronaut, Aliens, cowboys, World War II soldiers, Deep-sea diver, musketeer, Dracula, Roman, Turk)
- Miss Airgam (Indian woman, Police Officer, Nurse, Huntress, Hairdresser, Teacher, Maid)
- Super Fantastics (Stars Man, Bird Man, Red Masker, Panther Man, Captain Laser, Doctor Diabolic, Bad Tiger, Python)
- Space (Flying Saucer, Astronaut, Galaxy Patrol, Red Planet)
- Romans (Ben-Hur, Quadriga, Roman ship)
- Vehicles (Jeep, Motorcycle, Helicopter)

== Sources ==
- (in Spanish) Blog 1000 Airgam Boys
- (in Spanish) Airgamboys.com
