= .256 Winchester Magnum =

Firearms cartridge

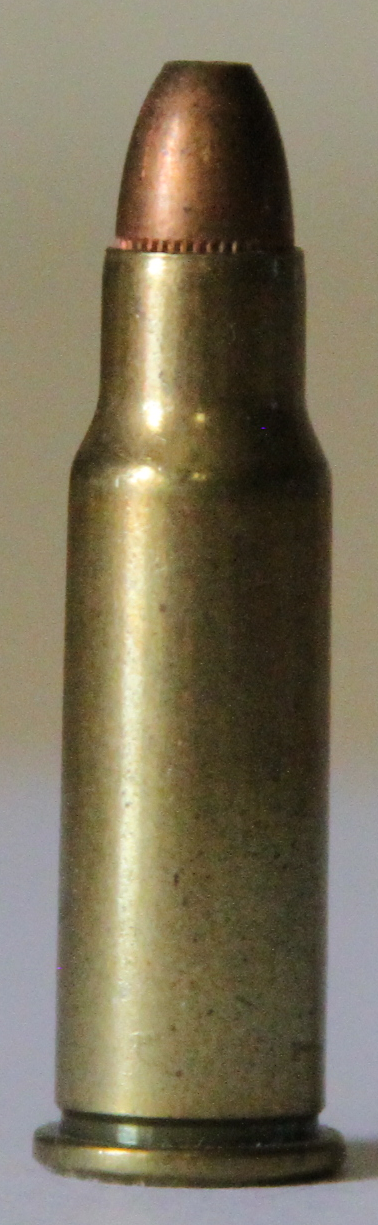
- Type: Handgun, rifle
- Place of origin: United States

Production history
- Designer: Ruger, Winchester
- Designed: 1960
- Manufacturer: Winchester
- Produced: 1961

Specifications
- Parent case: .357 Magnum
- Case type: Rimmed, Bottlenecked
- Bullet diameter: .257 in (6.5 mm)
- Neck diameter: .285 in (7.2 mm)
- Shoulder diameter: .368 in (9.3 mm)
- Base diameter: .381 in (9.7 mm)
- Rim diameter: .440 in (11.2 mm)
- Rim thickness: .060 in (1.5 mm)
- Case length: 1.281 in (32.5 mm)
- Overall length: 1.590 in (40.4 mm)
- Case capacity: 22 gr H_{2}O (1.4 cm^{3})
- Rifling twist: 1 in 14 in (360 mm)
- Primer type: Small pistol
- Maximum pressure: 50,000 psi (340 MPa)
- Maximum CUP: 43,000 CUP

Ballistic performance
Bullet mass/type	Velocity	Energy
60 gr (4 g) FMJ	2,350 ft/s (720 m/s)	735 ft⋅lbf (997 J)
60 gr (4 g) JHP*	2,760 ft/s (840 m/s)	1,015 ft⋅lbf (1,376 J)
- Test barrel length: 8.5" * 24"

The .256 Winchester Magnum is a firearms cartridge developed by Winchester, and was produced by necking-down a .357 Magnum cartridge to .257 diameter. It was designed for shooting small game and varmints.

== History ==
Introduced in 1960, Winchester offered ammo and reloading components into the early 1990s. The cartridge was first chambered in the Ruger Hawkeye single shot pistol. The next year (1962) Marlin chambered their Model 62 Levermatic rifle for the new Winchester cartridge. These were the two principal firearms chambered for the .256 Win. Mag. It is now obsolete and only offered as a chambering by custom manufacturers of single-shot firearm barrels such as Match Grade Machine and Bullberry. Previously, the Thompson Center Custom Shop had produced some, before closing its doors in 2010.

== Ballistics ==
From an 8.5 inch pistol barrel the 60 grain .256 Winchester factory load was advertised as having a MV of 2350 fps and ME of 735 ft. lbs. This was 250 fps faster and nearly twice as powerful as the .22 Remington Jet, a varmint cartridge for revolvers that was also based on a necked-down .357 Magnum case.

According to data from the fifth edition of the Hornady Handbook of Cartridge Reloading, handloaders with a .256 rifle can approximately duplicate the Winchester factory load using the Hornady 60 grain Flat Point bullet in front of 15.5 grains of H4227 powder for a MV of 2700 fps. The trajectory of that load looks like this: +2.3 inches at 50 yards, +4.4 inches at 100 yards, 0 at 200 yards, and -26.2 inches at 300 yards.

Winchester offered factory loaded .256 Magnum ammunition (and brass to reloaders) into the beginning of the 1990s. Winchester .256 factory loads used a 60 grain Open Point Expanding bullet at a MV of 2760 fps and ME of 1015 ft. lbs. from a 24-inch rifle barrel. That is about 500 fps faster than Winchester factory loads for the old .25-20 cartridge. At 200 yards the velocity was 1542 fps and the remaining energy was 317 ft. lbs.

== Firearms ==
The .256 Winchester Magnum was chambered in a very small selection of firearms, and never achieved great commercial success. Its firearms included:

- Marlin Model 62 Levermatic lever action
- Universal Firearms M1 carbine variant
- Ruger Hawkeye single-shot pistol
- Thompson Center Contender single-shot pistol barrel chambering

The 256 Winchester Magnum is also chambered occasionally in custom-built revolvers. Past candidates for this caliber conversion have included Ruger Old Model and New Model Blackhawks, and Smith & Wesson K-frames (Models 10, 14, 15, and 19). Colt produced a small number of Pythons in this caliber and retains a prototype in their museum.

== Gallery ==
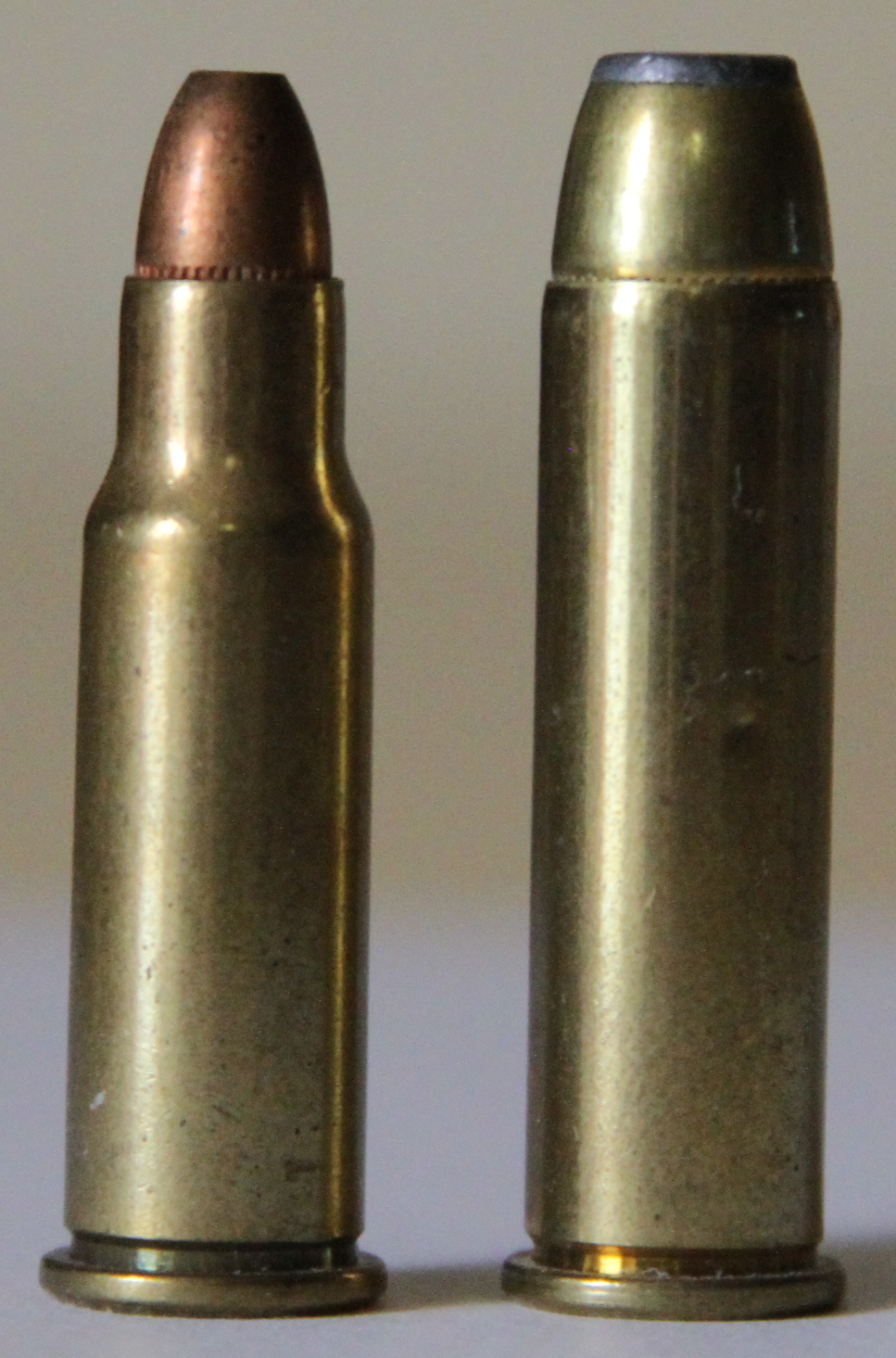
.256 Winchester Magnum round next to its parent case, the .357 Magnum.

== See also ==
- Table of handgun and rifle cartridges
