= J. C. Higgins =

Sporting goods sellers

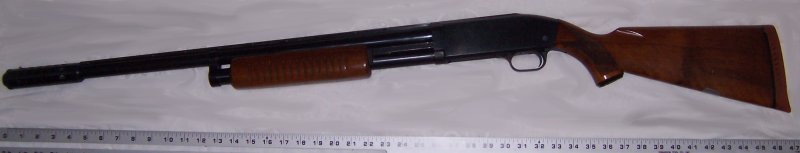
J.C. Higgins Model 20 - 12 Gauge Shotgun - Originally sold by Sears

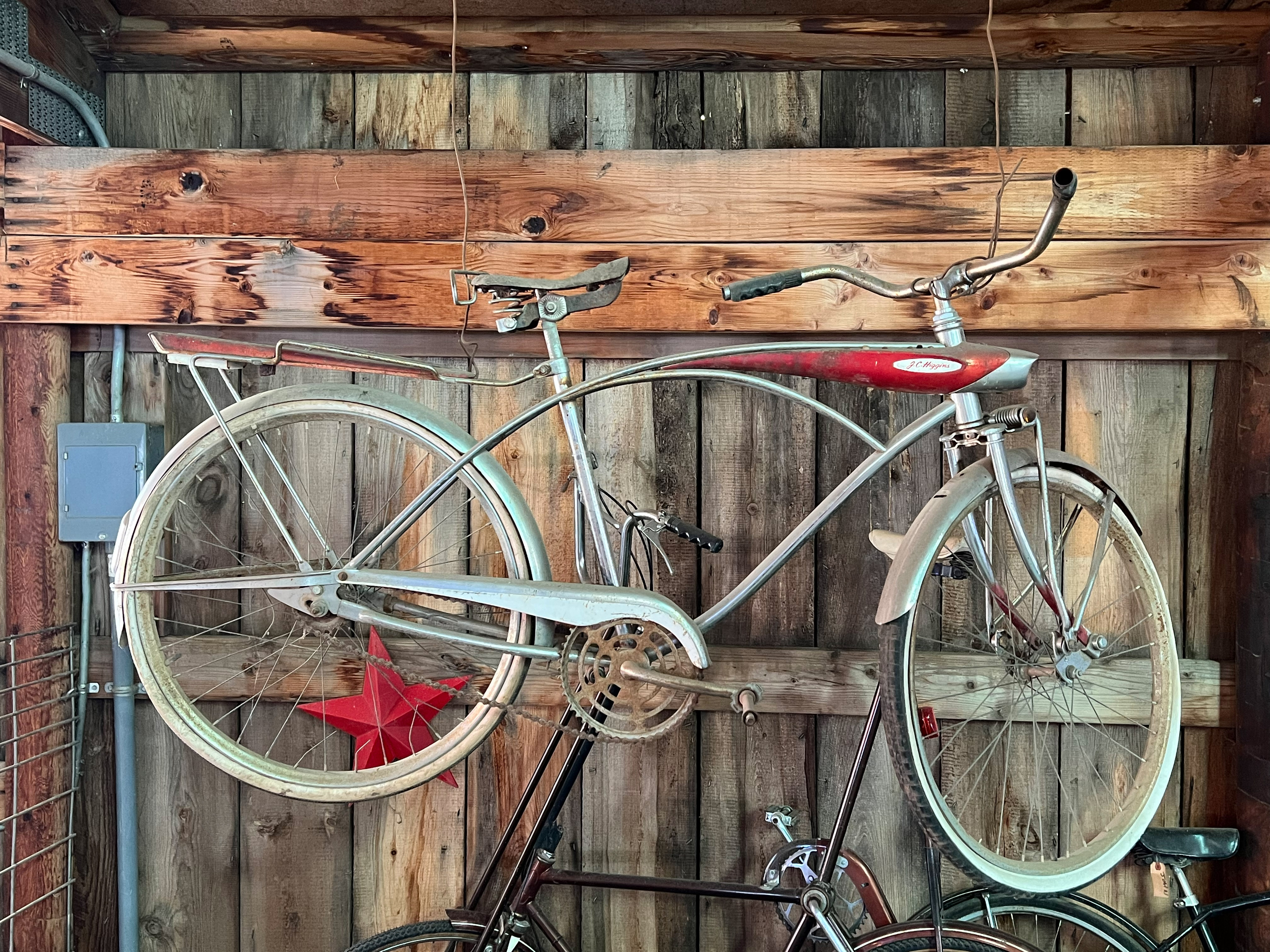
J.C. Higgins bicycle on display at the Pioneer Auto Museum, Murdo, South Dakota.

From 1908 until 1962, Sears, Roebuck & Company sold a wide variety of sporting goods and recreational equipment, including bicycles, golf clubs, rifles, shotguns, and revolvers under the brand name "J. C. Higgins." These products were well made and were popular with the company's historical core of rural and working-class consumers.

Like many other Sears products, the Sears firearms were originally made by major firearm manufacturers. The Model 20 was produced by High Standard Arms, as was the Model 88 revolver.

The J.C. Higgins brand for Sears sporting goods was replaced with the Ted Williams brand. Many of the more durable J.C. Higgins products are still available as second hand items.

The brand name, J. C. Higgins, was based on a real person, John Higgins who was a Sears employee. He moved from his birth country of Ireland to the United States in his late teens and began working for Sears in 1898. He spent his entire working career with Sears and was Vice President for the company for a period of time. He was actually born with no middle name but the Sears Co. presented the idea of labeling their sporting good line with his name and saw it more presentable labeling the brand as J.C. Higgins. He worked with the company until his retirement as head bookkeeper in 1930. Higgins died in 1950. His expertise in sporting goods or sports is unknown.

== Models ==
List of J.C. Higgins Firearms:

J.C. Higgins Model 101.1, a break-action single barrel shotgun made by Savage, Model 94.

J.C. Higgins Model 101.7, a break-action double-barrel shotgun made by Stevens a division of Savage, a duplicate of the Model 311.

J.C. Higgins Model 101.16, a single shot or semi-automatic tube fed .22 S/L/LR. Nicknamed the “click-clack” because of the sound it made as the bolt moved back and forth when shooting automatic. This rifle was manufactured by Savage Model 6A, Springfield Model 87, Ranger Model 110 in the early 1960’s.

J.C. Higgins Model 101.24, a bolt-action .22 LR made by Savage, Model 15-120.

J.C. Higgins Model 102.25, a pump-action shotgun made by the J Stevens Arms Co, Model 520A (1946–47)

J.C. Higgins Model 103.13, Sears model 25, bolt action tube fed .22 S-L-LR rifle. Made by Marlin Firearms. Copy of Marlin model 81.

J.C. Higgins Model 103.16, bolt action magazine fed .22 S-L-LR rifle. Made by Marlin Firearms. Copy of Marlin model 80.

J.C. Higgins Model 103.18, bolt action single shot .22 S-L-LR rifle. Made by Marlin Firearms. Copy of Marlin model 100.

J.C. Higgins Model 103.228 bolt action with removable 7-round magazine. Receiver grooves for scope mounting. Same as Marlin Model 80 (No serial number) .22 cal S-L-LR.

J.C. Higgins Model 103.229 bolt action with tubular magazine. Receiver grooves for scope mounting. Same as Marlin Model 81 (No serial number) .22 cal S-L-LR.

J.C. Higgins Model 103.350, break-action over-under shotgun. Made my Marlin Firearms. Copy of Marlin model 90.

J.C. Higgins Model 20, a 12, 16, or 20-gauge pump-action shotgun manufactured by High Standard, Model 200.

J.C. Higgins Model 21, p.n. 583-2079, a 20-gauge pump-action shotgun manufactured by High Standard.

J.C. Higgins Model 25, a semi-automatic .22 LR made by High Standard, Model A1041.

J.C. Higgins Model 30, a semi-automatic .22 LR with a retractable sling made by High Standard, Similar to High standard Model 30.

J.C. Higgins Model 31, a semi-automatic .22 LR [or .22 shorts] High Speed only.

J.C. Higgins Model 35, a pump action .22 cal L-S-LR rifle with a tube fed magazine. Manufactured by High Standard, Model P100.

J.C. Higgins Model 36 Auto, a semi-automatic .22 LR made by High Standard, Model 34.

J.C. Higgins Model 36 Bolt, a bolt action .22 LR made by Marlin, Model 80.

J.C. Higgins Model 42DLM, a magazine-fed .22 WMR bolt-action rifle, manufactured by Marlin, Model 80.

J.C. Higgins Model 43, a .22 short/.22 long/.22 long rifle tube-fed bolt-action rifle, manufactured by Marlin, similar to a Marlin Model 81, with slight changes to the bolt and a chrome plated trigger guard.

J.C. Higgins Model 44DL, a .22 caliber lever action "Levermatic" rifle manufactured by Marlin, Model 57.

J.C. Higgins Model 44DLM, a .22 WMR caliber lever action "Levermatic" rifle manufactured by Marlin, Model 57M.

J.C. Higgins Model 45, lever action in .35 Remington and 30-30, Sears# 103-450 manufactured by Marlin, same as a Marlin 336C.

J.C. Higgins Model 50, a bolt-action rifle with a commercial FN Mauser action and a chrome-lined barrel from High Standard. Made in 270 and 30-06.

J.C. Higgins Model 51, same as the Model 50 with a fancier checkered stock with cheekpiece.

J.C. Higgins Model 51L, a bolt action centerfire rifle with a Husqvarna action.

J.C. Higgins Model 52 a bolt action 22 Hornet made by SAKO, Model L46.

J.C. Higgins Model 60, a semi-automatic shotgun manufactured by High Standard, (unsure of exact model).

J.C. Higgins Model 80, a semi-automatic .22 LR pistol, a copy of the Hi-Standard M101 with a brown plastic target grip, mfg. by Hi-Standard.

J.C. Higgins Model 85, a semi-automatic .22 LR pistol, manufactured by Manufacture D'Armes Des Pyrenees (MAPF). Also sold as Unique Model D-2 and Wards Westernfield Model 5.

J.C. Higgins Model 88, a .22 LR 9 shot revolver manufactured by High Standard.

J.C. Higgins 12 ga. bolt-action shotgun Model 153 maker unknown.
