= Vivid Imaginations =

UK toy company

- Company type: Private company
- Industry: Toys and Games
- Founded: 1992
- Headquarters: Guildford, Surrey, United Kingdom
- Key people: Nick Thomas (General Manager)
- Services: Manufacturing, Distribution, Wholesale
- Website: www.vividtoysandgames.co.uk

Vivid Imaginations is a British toy manufacturer, distributor and wholesale company, based in Guildford, Surrey.

Founded in 1992, one of the company's first toy lines it manufactured was Captain Scarlet, which has since been followed by Thunderbirds, Sindy and The Simpsons. In 1994, Kitty in My Pocket was released. After a few years of manufacturing, Vivid Imaginations began securing toy distribution and wholesale deals with The Walt Disney Company, MGA Entertainment, Jakks Pacific and Crayola for the UK market. Their main areas of expertise are within preschool, plush, dolls, collectables, action figures and arts and crafts. Vivid also produce games and puzzles along with tech and outdoor toys.

The company increased its presence as a manufacturer in the 2010s by releasing dolls for music acts including Take That, JLS, The Wanted, One Direction and Justin Bieber. This would be followed by house-developed lines such as Animagic, and the popular award-winning Moshi Monsters. Vivid Imaginations would also go on to sign agreements with large TV networks, such as Nickelodeon in 2017, working on the series Nella the Princess Knight.

In 2018, the Goliath Group, a family-owned Netherlands toys and games manufacturer, acquired Vivid Imaginations, where it continues to operate as a subsidiary in manufacturing and distribution.

== History ==
Vivid Imaginations was founded in 1992 by former Matchbox Toys UK managing director Nick Austin and Finance Director Alan Bennie, with a loan of £380,000 from friends. The annual company turnover was £9.8 m in its first year and increased to over £20 m in 1996. The increase was partly due to acquiring the rights to distribute Disney and The Simpsons products in 1996 and distributing the Toy of the Year, the Pogmaker. Jordan Group, a private equity company from New York City, bought an 80% stake in Vivid in 1998 for £25 m. In 1999, Vivid started distributing Sindy and obtained the rights to Playmates Toys and Toy Biz products.

Vivid became the third-largest advertiser in the United Kingdom and the number three toy company in 2000. In 2003, Vivid Imaginations was bought by Phoenix Equity Partners, its management and venture capital company, for £62 million.

Vivid Imaginations acquired licensing rights to Bratz in 2004. Vivid had a strong market share in the boys' toy sector and saw Bratz as the opportunity to boost its girls' range, which included Care Bears, Disney Princess and Sindy, to rival Barbie owner Mattel. Bratz was the most popular doll in the UK in 2005, and was responsible for 30% of Vivid's turnover. Sales of Bratz and Spider-Man-themed products made Vivid the number one toy company in the UK in 2005, the first British company to achieve this in 30 years. Bratz owner MGA Entertainment set up its own UK office in 2008 and ended the distribution deal with Vivid.

The Paris-based Vivid Europe subsidiary was formed in 2008 with the acquisition of Nomad Company, the distributor of Crayola across Europe (except Italy), the Middle East and Africa. In 2011, Vivid produced a line of toys for the television show Little Charley Bear and partnered with social network developer Mind Candy to produce Moshi Monsters toys. In 2015, Vivid acquired the rights to produce a range of toys on the science-fiction television programme, Thunderbirds Are Go. Vivid produced and distributed Thunderbird aircraft, action figures, puzzles and more.

In March 2017, Privet Capital, a private equity investor, announced the acquisition of Vivid Imaginations for an undisclosed fee.

In November 2018, Goliath, took over from Privet Capital as owner of Vivid Imaginations.
