= Chapina carbine =

Bolt-action rifle of Brazilian origin

- Type: Carbine
- Place of origin: Brazil

Production history
- Manufacturer: Empresa Irmãos Chapina S/A. Industria Metalúrgica
- Produced: 1964-1975

Specifications
- Cartridge: .32-20 Winchester
- Caliber: 7.65mm
- Action: Bolt-action
- Feed system: 5 round box magazine
- Sights: Iron

The Chapina carbine is a bolt-action rifle of Brazilian origin, manufactured between 1964 and 1975 by Empresa Irmãos Chapina S/A in the Itaquaquecetuba municipality; it was primarily intended for the civilian market and private security companies. The weapon is chambered in the .32-20WCF calibre – the highest legally available to civilians under the Brazilian military government − and is fed from a 5-round detachable box magazine.
