= Garand carbine =

Garand Carbine
- Type: Carbine
- Place of origin: United States

Production history
- Designer: John Garand
- Designed: 1941
- Produced: prototype only

Specifications
- Mass: 4.9lbs
- Length: 34 7/8ins
- Barrel length: 18ins
- Cartridge: .30 Carbine
- Action: Gas operated piston, locking bolt
- Feed system: 5, 10, 20, 50 round detachable box magazines
- Sights: Iron sight

The Garand carbine was John Garand's entry during the Light Rifle program that produced the M1 Carbine. The weapon was chambered in the .30 Carbine round and was fed from a magazine inserted from the top right side.

== History ==
The first Springfield light rifle was designed by John Garand for the .30 Carbine competitions (tested 26–28 May 1941), which had the top feed magazine. It required offset sights to allow for the top mounted magazine and ejected rounds, which frequently strike the operator's left arm.

The second Springfield (Garand) Cal .30 Light Rifle (tested 15 Sep 1941), had a more conventional bottom feed magazine placement but was heavier than the first model. Neither model went past prototype development.
