= Sindy =

Fashion doll made in the United Kingdom

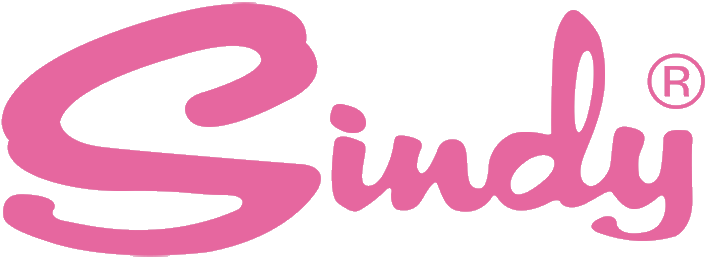
- Type: Doll
- Company: Pedigree Dolls & Toys (from 1963); Hasbro (1986-1997); Vivid Imaginations (1999-2002); Kid Kreations (2020-2023)
- Country: United Kingdom
- Availability: 1963–Present
- Slogan: The doll you love to dress
- pedigreetoys.com/sindy

Sindy is a British fashion doll created by Pedigree Dolls & Toys in 1963. A rival to Barbie, Sindy's look and range of fashions and accessories made her the best-selling toy in the United Kingdom in 1968 and 1970.

After Marx Toys' unsuccessful attempt to introduce Sindy in the United States in the late 1970s, Hasbro bought the rights to Sindy and remodelled the doll to look more American. As a result, the doll's popularity declined; in addition, Barbie manufacturer Mattel filed a lawsuit for copyright infringement, which was settled when Hasbro agreed to remodel Sindy's face. During the 1990s, Barbie's share of the doll market continued to grow while Sindy's diminished, which led to Sindy being delisted from major retailers in 1997.

Hasbro returned the doll's licence to Pedigree, and the doll was relaunched in 1999, manufactured by Vivid Imaginations. Sindy's 40th anniversary in 2003 saw a new manufacturer, New Moons, and another relaunch and redesign. There were further relaunches in 2016 by Tesco and in 2021 by Kid Kreations. There is a 60th anniversary Sindy doll which was launched at the end of 2023 to celebrate 60 years of Sindy.

== Development and launch ==
After 20 years of producing dolls, Pedigree Dolls & Toys, a British company in Exeter, sought to expand its product range to include a trendy fashion doll. American toy manufacturer Mattel offered Pedigree a licence to produce Barbie, which Pedigree declined due to market research showing Barbie was unpopular with British buyers. Instead Pedigree manufactured its own doll based on another American doll, Tammy. With permission from Tammy's manufacturer, the Ideal Toy Company, Pedigree also borrowed Tammy's slogan, "The doll you love to dress". The name "Sindy" was chosen after a street poll where young girls were shown a photo of the doll and asked to choose their favourite name from a list of four. The most popular choice was "Cindy", and the spelling was made more distinctive for trademarking.

The Sindy doll was launched in September 1963, and London retailers were sent a promotional 45 rpm gramophone record to introduce the doll, which included Pedigree's marketing text below.

Sindy is the free, swinging girl that every little girl longs to be. Sindy has sports clothes, glamour clothes, everyday clothes — a dog, skates, a gramophone — everything... Every genuine Sindy outfit is a child's dream come true. Each one is designed for today's fashionable young women by today's leading women designers. They are authentic miniature replicas of the latest adult clothes.

== Brand and doll evolution ==
=== Developing accessories and American release ===
Scenesetter accessories from 1969 based on housework and home life.

Pedigree Toys' market research was correct – Sindy's "girl next door" look made her more popular than Barbie in Britain. Sindy's boyfriend Paul was released in 1965, and her younger sister Patch in 1966. Sindy's friends Vicki and Mitzi, and Patch's friends Poppet and Betsy debuted in 1968. Sindy was the best selling toy in Britain in 1968 and 1970. Sindy's success in the 1960s was partly due to the increasing range of accessories, with up to 70% of Sindy's turnover from sales of accessories. Mattel did not greatly expand Barbie's accessories until the 1980s, and this was a significant difference between the dolls.

During the 1970s, Pedigree focused on developing more Sindy products and neglected advertising and market research, risking Sindy's "girl next door" image becoming old-fashioned. In 1978, Sindy was introduced to the United States market by Marx Toys. Child star Susan Olsen, who played Cindy Brady on the popular family sitcom The Brady Bunch, was featured in a U.S. produced commercial for the doll. Most of Sindy's accessories and fashions were similar to those sold in the United Kingdom, except for the addition of a friend, Gayle, and a McDonald's-themed Sindy. Marx Toys went into receivership in 1980 and Sindy was withdrawn from the US market.

=== Focus on relaunches, fashion and advertising ===
During the 1980s, Pedigree's new marketing director David Brown made several changes, including increasing advertising and market research, and consulting often with fashion experts to ensure the doll's image was kept up to date. Pedigree produced a number of evening dresses designed by The Emmanuels, famous for designing Princess Diana's wedding gown, shortly after Mattel released gowns for Barbie designed by Oscar de la Renta. Due to its success, a second collection of designs was released the next year, including a bubble dress and lingerie. An older-looking Sindy doll was released in 1985, with male and female companions Mark and Marie. The advertising campaign was worth £1.5 million.

A sample of Sindy's up-to-date fashions in 1984.

In 1986, Sindy manufacturers took advantage of new colour-changing technology and released Magic Moments Sindy, a doll whose hair and swimming costume changed colour when immersed in warm water. Sindy's senior designer Jane Braithwaite travelled to Paris each month to research fashion trends for Sindy's clothing in an attempt to reverse declining sales. As an example of Sindy's continually updated fashions, during this period the doll's footwear included kitten heels, sandals, knee-high boots, ankle boots, trainers, slippers, court shoes and slingbacks.

In 1987, Sindy's product manager Edward Machin announced that Sindy would reclaim the lead over Barbie within two years. Hasbro redesigned Sindy and spent approximately £1.5 m on advertising. A Sindy magazine was also launched in this period to challenge the fortnightly Barbie magazine. A £1 million advertising campaign was introduced in 1991 with five advertisements highlighting Sindy's collection of beach and pool wear. The advertisement showed footage of Sindy combined with live action sequences from a look-alike.

In 1993, Sindy was featured in a £500,000 advertising campaign for the fashion company Alexon Group. Sindy was used to contrast her childish fashion with the sophistication of Alexon's fashion range. Each double page spread showed Sindy in a typical outfit superimposed on a real-life setting. The opposite page showed a real woman dressed in Alexon's clothes above the line 'Dressing up for grown ups'.

=== Brand decline and lawsuits ===
Hasbro introduced Sindy in France and continental Europe in 1994 after minor facial modifications to reduce her resemblance to Barbie. A Neilsen study suggested Sindy could obtain 20% of the ₣500–600 m market in France alone. The chief executive of Hasbro France, Paul Audouy, said recent innovations such as the ability for Sindy to swim and walk a small dog would strengthen her market position. Hasbro invested ₣5 million in the first week of her advertising launch. A new black friend for Sindy was released in 1995, named Imani, 30 years after Sindy's American friend Gayle was withdrawn after low sales. Hasbro released the new doll in response to "overwhelming demand".

Hasbro withdrew its £5.5 m advertising support for the Sindy doll in 1997 amid rumours that major retailers were planning to delist the doll. The editor of UK Toy News, Jon Salisbury, said, "This is Hasbro taking Sindy out of its main range. But she is running so far behind Barbie it is almost a non-issue. If delisted by bigger retailers, which seems to be happening, then the brand will lose momentum". In 1994, Sindy had a seven percent share of the £70 m doll market, and Barbie held 16%. By 1996, Barbie's share had increased to 30%, estimated by Mattel to be worth £100 m per year including licensing deals, and Sindy's share had only climbed to eight percent. Sindy's popularity had also been overtaken during that period by Polly Pocket. One explanation for the large variation in market share is the unpopular Americanisation of the Sindy doll in the mid-1980s. The Sindy doll was still available to retailers during this period, but had to be ordered in bulk from the Hong Kong manufacturer.

=== Return to Pedigree Toys and further doll makeovers ===
Sindy and Barbie went head-to-head in August 1999, when both manufacturers created large advertising campaigns for the dolls and Sindy was relaunched. The manufacturers updated the dolls' images and revamped them with a "millennium look". Sindy was transformed into a younger-looking doll with "new themes, new friends and a new family, fitting today's environment and in tune with the street-cred concerns of today's young girls", according to Vivid Imaginations' marketing director, Paul Weston, from the company then producing Sindy. Pedigree, which owns the rights to Sindy, licensed the doll to Vivid Imaginations after Hasbro ceased production of the doll. The doll market in the United Kingdom during this time was worth £77 million, with Barbie holding a share of over 75%.

The Sindy doll entered the digital world in 2000 when Pedigree Toys introduced an official website. Monitor Media, the website design company, said, "Sindy.com brings Sindy to life for six-year-old girls just getting to grips with computers while sitting on their Mum's knee. They can dress her up, paint her bedroom in different colours, read her secret diary, chat with other Sindy fans and send her e-mails".

In 40 years, nearly 100 million Sindy dolls were sold in Britain alone, and in 2003, Sindy was relaunched for her 40th birthday. Her figure was changed to more closely resemble the girls the doll is marketed towards. Denise Deane, the head of design and development at New Moons, the new Sindy manufacturer, said, "She's lost the big breasts and very long legs, and we've completely changed her face. She's totally unrecognisable. Sindy's still very popular, but she has been neglected over the last few years, and we don't think people are identifying with that look. She's going to look like a 15-year-old, and we've designed her to wear trainers." The doll was released in two versions: six-inch and full-size.

Sindy was relaunched again in 2006, this time resembling a 12- to 14-year-old. Jerry Reynolds, chief executive officer of Pedigree Toys explained, "If you take the Sindy of yester-year she was between 12 and 14 years while Barbie was twenty-something. She got too close to Barbie in the '80s and '90s and has now effectively returned to that younger positioning." The doll was again released in two sizes, with the standard-size Sindy a Woolworths exclusive. The 2006 Sindy was aimed at three- to five-year-old girls, younger than the audience targeted by Bratz dolls, and mothers who wanted a more innocent-looking doll for their daughters than Barbie or Bratz dolls.

Tonner Doll Company released a collection of high end dolls in 2013, the first one made for the 2013 Sindy Convention in the U.K.

Tesco in 2016 released a new 18-inch Sindy doll alongside new friends, various outfits and accessories.

Kid Kreations released a playline in 2021 based on the classic Sindy face mould. There were announcements of a further relaunch in 2023 after the release of the Barbie film.

== Controversies and lawsuits ==
The January 1989 redesign made Sindy look more like her rival Barbie. In response, Mattel sought and won an injunction against Hasbro after claiming the new Sindy doll was easily confused with their product. After a French court decided that the Sindy doll infringed on Mattel's copyright in early 1992, the case was settled in December when Hasbro agreed to alter Sindy's face. Mattel and Hasbro released the following joint statement, "Hasbro has remodeled the head of Sindy in a way which Mattel and Hasbro have agreed is acceptable. As a result, Mattel has agreed to drop all outstanding lawsuits relating to Sindy and Barbie around the world. Each party will be responsible for its own costs". The case was previously ruled in Hasbro's favour in Spain and Greece.

Similar to many fashion dolls, including Barbie, Sindy has been criticised by feminist groups who said her figure set an unrealistic standard for young girls. After Hasbro returned the brand to Pedigree Toys, Pedigree responded to the backlash against "cosmetically enhanced bimbo" dolls by making Sindy more wholesome and less shapely.

A minor controversy occurred in 1998 when Hasbro expressed a desire to make a Sindy doll that looked like Princess Diana, shortly after former prime minister John Major recommended sensitivity when making commercial deals to honour the late princess. The Princess' Memorial Fund denied Hasbro's request, but did not rule out the possibility of a future doll, "if it met the requirements of the trustees and was judged acceptable to the public".

== Collecting ==
The Sindy doll is popular among collectors, and websites provide advice on how to re-root the doll's hair and replace parts. Mint condition dolls are the most sought after. Many collectors shunned the "American look" Sindy developed by Hasbro, while the value of the Pedigree dolls increased. In 2003, a first-edition Sindy, complete with original Foale and Tuffin "Weekenders" outfit (jeans and a striped sweatshirt), box and fashion booklet was worth approximately £160–200. Sindy's rarer friend Gayle (a doll made for the American market in 1975) was worth up to £400, and Mitzi (her French friend from 1968) up to £500.

December 2006 saw the launch of a collectible version of the original Sindy, one called "Classic Sindy" and manufactured in porcelain. Created by Anne Zielinski-Old, distributed by the Danbury Mint and still licensed by Pedigree Dolls & Toys, the "Weekender" was the first in a series.

With Sindy doll's 50th birthday approaching in 2013, Pedigree toys was designing a new range of merchandise. This would include laptop covers, notepaper, mobile phone cases, gift tags, shoes and accessories aimed at teenagers. A new doll was reported to be in the design stages.

In September 2020 a collector’s line of six Sindy dolls was introduced by the Sindy Collectors Club. Inspired by the original Pedigree dolls, each of the six dolls wears a modern interpretation of the fashions of original Sindy doll releases from 1963: Shopping Look, Weekender, City Chic, Dream Date, Skater Girl, and Sleepy Time. Each of the six versions is limited to 1,963 dolls. The dolls are manufactured by Kid Kreations of Staffordshire, England.

In September 2023, coinciding with Sindy doll's 60th birthday, a new collector's doll was announced, again limited to 1,963 dolls. This doll will be released in Spring 2024.

== In popular culture ==
Beginning in 1963, Sindy was featured as a weekly comic strip — Sindy and Her Friends — first in Fleetway Publications' School Friend (c. 1963–1964, drawn by Cecil Graveney), and then in June and School Friend (from 1965, drawn by Phil Townsend).
