= Palitoy =

Former British toy company

- Formerly: Cascelloid Company
- Type: Private (1919–31); Subsidiary (1931–94)
- Industry: Entertainment
- Founded: 1919
- Founder: Alfred Pallett in Coalville
- Defunct: 1994; 32 years ago
- Headquarters: U.K.
- Key people: Bill Pugh (designer)
- Products: Dolls, action figures
- Brands: Action Man; Action Force; Pippa; Tressy
- Parent: British Xylonite (1931–68); General Mills (1968–85); Kenner Parker (1985-87); Tonka (1987–91); Hasbro (1991–94)
- Subsidiaries: Chad Valley

Palitoy was a British toy company of the 60s, 70s and 80s. It manufactured some of the most popular toys in Britain, some original items and others under licence. Its products included Action Man, Action Girl, Action Force, Tiny Tears, Pippa, Tressy, Mainline Model Railways, Merlin, Star Wars figures, Play-Doh and the Care Bears.

History

Cascelloid Limited was founded by Alfred Edward Pallett in Leicester in 1919 to produce Celluloid and fancy goods. His first toy, the Flitafast Windmill, was in 1920 and the first doll, Diddums based on drawings by Mabel Lucy Atwell, in 1925.

Cascelloid was bought in 1931 by British Xylonite Limited and the name Palitoy Playthings was created as a trademark in 1935 for their toy division as a homage to founder Pallett who remained as Managing Director until 1943. Injection moulding, blow moulding and rotational moulding were developed by British Xylonite in 1941 and were used for the Palitoy toy ranges.

Many patents were lodged by Cascelloid, including sleeping eyes and artificial hair for dolls, and the ingenious drinking, crying and wetting mechanism. The mechanism was used on the Patsy doll for many years and also Yvonne, named The Doll of the Century in the press. In 1965 it was a major feature of Tiny Tears.

In the early 1960s there was another buy-out and Cascelloid’s new owners were Bakelite Xylonite Limited. It was decided in 1962 to split the toy division Palitoy at Coalville from the industrial side of the business in Leicester. Miles Fletcher, assisted by future Managing Director Bob Simpson, moved to Coalville with other staff members, including designers, to ‘make money’ from the toys. The Toy Division of BXL introduced the iconic toys Tressy, Tiny Tears and Action Man at this time.

In 1968, the Palitoy brand and the factory in Coalville were sold to US food company General Mills, and formed part of the company's toy division, later known as CPG Products Corp (Creative Products Group Products Corp). The next year GM bought the Miro Company in France to expand internationally its Parker Brothers board game division. Palitoy began licensing toys from Kenner and also started its Parker Games division.

In 1970, General Mills bought Denys Fisher to expand its toy range from Kenner with such products as Six Million Dollar Man. Later, it became part of Palitoy before being wound up and its products absorbed by the Palitoy UK toy group.

In 1978, the Chad Valley toys company was bought by General Mills and also became part of the Palitoy UK toy group.

In 1971, Airfix had bought Triang (owners Lines Brothers) and through it acquired the rights of Meccano in the UK. At the same time General Mills acquired the worldwide rights, ex UK, to the construction toy and put production into the Miro factory in Calais, changing the company name to Miro Meccano. In 1981, British toy group Airfix Products fell into receivership and it was bought by General Mills. This enabled Palitoy to market Meccano in the UK. Palitoy was also able to distribute the Airfix kit range and its Great Model Railways (GMR) range which joined Mainline Railways, originally developed by the Palitoy design team. The Airfix development team moved from London to the Coalville factory.

Up to about 1980, Palitoy, under the leadership of Bob Simpson, was left to run the company without undue interference from its owners General Mills but, with the great success of Star Wars toys, which were introduced by Kenner (and by Palitoy under licence in the UK) in 1978, General Mills created the autonomous Toy Group, based in New York and headed by Bernie Loomis who had masterminded the licencing from George Lucas. GMTG, or CPG (Creative Products Group), were charged with running all the toy companies owned by General Mills. This resulted in a policy of global branding and a consolidation of all the European toy companies. Peter Waterman replaced Bob Simpson as MD and a whole new marketing department was deployed. Manufacturing at the Coalville and Calais factories was controlled and gradually phased out for Far East imports. Packaging became multilingual, without company names and logos, which allowed for ease of shipping between the various European countries. At Palitoy, many of the toys that were very successful during the 1970s were phased out or sold on to new owners. Tiny Tears last outing was in the 1983 catalogue, but was revived later by Tonka. Mainline Railways appeared in the 1984 catalogue but did not continue. The once flagship range, Action Man, was included in the clear-out and the licence returned to competitors Hasbro in 1984. Now, all new products would be developed in the USA so the design and development department was made redundant.

In January 1985, General Mills announced it would be quitting the toy business. The reason was the loss of $10 million caused by the Great Video Games Crash of 1983 and a disastrous manufacturing venture in Mexico. On 1st May 1985 most of the manufacturing work at Palitoy ended. 327 staff in manufacturing and distribution out of a total 585 workforce were made redundant with the rest of manufacturing shifted overseas. (At its peak in the 1970s the company had grown to 1000 staff.) The restructure was undertaken in advance of the spin-off of the General Mills' toy division CPG. There were many potential acquirers of the business, but none from the toy industry, so the subsidiary was floated on the stock exchange as Kenner Parker, with General Mills' shareholders getting equivalent shares in Kenner Parker. This was more tax efficient for General Mills. This decision obviously impacted Palitoy which adopted the Kenner Parker name, becoming absorbed into a single uniform global toy and games company. The 3-times doll of the year, Tiny Tears, also found a new home. Other brands were simply wound up. The only products from the Palitoy days, shown in the Kenner Parker trade catalogue at the January Toy Fair, was Action Force, which was heavily complete with Hasbro G.I. Joe products. Also included was Spirograph (Denys Fisher) and Airfix kits. The Airfix kit business was sold to Humbrol.

In 1987, Tonka purchased Kenner Parker for $555 million, borrowing extensively to fund the acquisition. However, Tonka bought on the Friday before Black Monday (October 19^{th}) so its shares plummeted. The company struggled on but the cost of servicing the debt meant Tonka itself had to find a buyer and it was eventually acquired by Hasbro in 1991.

Hasbro closed the former Palitoy site in 1994 with the machinery that made Play-Doh, the last product to be manufactured there, being transferred to Hasbro's Irish factory. The Coalville factory was bought by a Leicester property company and is now the Coalville Business Park.

In 2016 fans of the popular Action Man toy gathered to celebrate his 50th birthday at the site, which had hardly changed since the 1980s. The following year, 80 years after toys were first manufactured in Coalville, Palitoy was honoured with a green plaque by Leicestershire County Council for helping "stoke children's imaginations". Many former employees, friends and heritage groups attended the unveiling of the plaque by Bob Simpson on the building which saw so many iconic toys distributed throughout the kingdom and abroad.

In 2019 (the centenary of the founding of Caselloid by Alf Pallett), Coalville Heritage Society, with the help of a grant from the National Lottery Heritage Fund, staged an exhibition at the former toy factory called The Many Faces of Palitoy. It ran for four weeks and was opened by former Managing Director Bob Simpson and attended by many former employees, children from local schools and those that once found so much enjoyment from the toys produced by this famous company.

In 2022 Simpson, shortly after he died, was honoured when his name was revealed on the original factory – now called The Simpson Building.

== Brands and licenses ==
- Action Force – developed at Palitoy
- Action Man – licenced from Hasbro but transformed into a British icon
- Action Girl – developed at Palitoy
- Discovery Time – a range of pre-school toys from various licencees
- Mainline Railways – developed at Palitoy
- Parker Games – initially licensed from Parker Brothers but many Palitoy-developed games added
- Pippa – developed at Palitoy
- Star Wars – licensed from sister company Kenner. Palitoy-designed card Death Star.
- Tiny Tears – developed at Palitoy
- Tressy – licenced from The American Character Doll Company
