= Tommy Gun (book) =

Tommy Gun: How General Thompson's Submachine Gun Wrote History
- Author: Bill Yenne
- Language: English
- Genre: History
- Published: 2009
- Publisher: Thomas Dunne Books
- Publication place: United States
- Pages: 352
- ISBN: 978-0312383268

Tommy Gun: How General Thompson's Submachine Gun Wrote History is a non-fiction book written by San Francisco author Bill Yenne in 2009. The book traces the history of the Thompson submachine gun, also known as the Tommy gun, through its usage in warfare, organised crime, and subsequently, its presence in film and television, as an "immortal icon."

== Background ==
Tommy Gun details the development of the Thompson submachine gun, created by John T. Thompson towards the end of World War I, and the reasons that made it an attractive weapon to the Mafia during the Prohibition era, and the United States Armed Forces, who adopted it during World War II.

== Reception ==
Kirkus Reviews described Tommy Gun as an "in-depth, entertaining history of the legendary weapon", and praised the attention given to the technical details of the weapon, alongside the "meticulous" overview of 20th century small arms. Richard Carleton Hacker of Shooting Illustrated called it a "must read."

San Francisco Chronicle writer Jesse Berrett was more critical, saying that the book was "entertaining in spots", but criticised it for being "anecdotal to a fault. It poses no argument, offers no political perspective, and worse, endorses no principle of selection; ultimately the lack of analysis, or direction, grows frustrating." Though Berrett praised the "astonishing range" of photographs, he said that "Yenne loves his subject so much that his perspective blurs when he raises his eyes", resulting in a "frustratingly apolitical" work.
