= Pappas =

- Language: Greek

Origin
- Meaning: Priest

Other names
- Variant form: Bibas

Pappas or Papas (Greek: Παππάς, Παπάς) is a Greek surname, which means "priest" (occupational surname). In the United States, it is often a shortened form of a longer surname like Papadopoulos or Papageorgiou. The genitive form, Pappa or Papa (Greek: Παππά, Παπά), is used by women. Notable individuals with this surname include:

- Alexi Pappas (born 1990), Greek-American long-distance runner
- Alexis Pappas (1915–2010), Norwegian chemist
- Arthur Pappas, Australian rugby player
- Athena Papas, American dental science scholar
- Charilaos Pappas (born 1983), Greek soccer player
- Charles H. Papas (1918–2007), American applied physicist and electrical engineer
- Chris Pappas (American politician) (born 1980), U.S. Representative
- Chris Pappas (South African politician) (born 1991), member of the KwaZulu-Natal Legislature
- DeAnna Pappas (born 1981), American TV Personality
- Diane Pappas (born 1971), Democratic member of the Illinois House of Representatives
- Doug Pappas (1962–2004), American baseball expert
- Emmanouel Pappas (1772–1821), leader in the Greek War of Independence from the Ottoman Empire
- Erik Pappas (born 1966), American baseball player
- George Pappas (born 1942), American epistemologist and professor of philosophy
- George Pappas (bowler) (born 1947), American professional bowler
- Gregory Fernando Pappas (born 1960), American philosopher
- Irene Papas (1929–2022), Greek actress and singer
- Isabella Pappas (born 2002), English actress and singer
- Ithaka Darin Pappas (born 1966), Californian interdisciplinary artist
- James Pappas (born 1944), American politician from Nebraska
- Jared Pappas-Kelley, American filmmaker and publisher
- Judith Zaffirini (née Pappas, born 1946), American politician from Texas
- Leonidas Pappas (born 1967), Greek wrestler
- Manolis Pappas (born 1951), Greek soccer player
- Marc Pappas, American politician from New Hampshire
- Maria Pappa (born 1971), Swiss politician
- Michael Papas, Greek-Cypriot independent filmmaker
- Michael James Pappas (born 1960), American politician from New Jersey
- Milt Pappas (1939–2016), American baseball player
- Nick Pappas, Australian solicitor (lawyer) active in the South Sydney Rabbitohs Rugby League
- Nikolaos Pappas (1930–2013), Greek admiral
- Nikos Pappas (basketball) (born 1990), Greek basketball player
- Nikos Pappas (politician), Greek politician
- Robin Pappas, American actress
- Sophocles Papas (1893 or 1894–1986), Greek classical guitar pedagogue and music publisher.
- Tas Pappas (born 1975), Australian skateboarder
- Tasos Pappas (born 1984), Greek soccer player
- Theodore Pappas, executive editor of the Encyclopædia Britannica
- Thomas Pappas (born 1959), United States Army officer involved in the Abu Ghraib scandal
- Tom Pappas (born 1976), American track and field decathlete
- William Papas (1927–2000), South African political cartoonist and caricaturist

== See also ==
- Pappas Restaurants, American restaurant chain based in Texas
- Pappas Telecasting Companies, broadcasting companies based in California
- Emmanouil Pappas (municipality), municipality in the Serres Prefecture, Greece
- Thomas J. Pappas School, schools based in Arizona
- Breakfast at Pappa's, 1998 English punk rock album
