= Pipas =

Pipas may refer to:

- The plural of pipa, a Chinese stringed instrument
- A Mediterranean surname, also spelled Bibas
  - James Pipas, American virologist
- Pipas Bay, a bay in Angola

== See also ==
- Pipa (disambiguation)
