= Pipa (disambiguation) =

The pipa is a plucked Chinese string instrument.

Pipa or PIPA may also refer to:

== Legislation ==
- Personal Information Protection and Electronic Documents Act, part of Canadian privacy law
- PROTECT IP Act, a proposed American law

== People ==
- Pipa or Pipara (3rd century AD), the daughter of Attalus, king of the Marcomanni
- Bhagat Pipa (1424–1500s), a prince from Rajasthan, India
- Jean-Pierre Dikongué Pipa (born 1940), a Cameroonian film director and writer
- Alexander Pipa (born 1983), a German rugby union player
- Pipa (footballer) (born 1998), Spanish footballer
- Pipa Jing, a character in the Chinese novel Fengshen Yanyi

== Places ==
- Pipa, Gansu, a town in Longnan, Gansu, China
- Pipa, Sichuan, a town in Fushun County, Sichuan, China
- Pipa Subdistrict, a subdistrict of Gulou District, Xuzhou, Jiangsu, China
- Pipa Beach, a village and beach in the state of Rio Grande do Norte, Brazil
- Phoenix Islands Protected Area, a marine protected area located in the Republic of Kiribati

== Other ==
- Pípá (枇杷), Mandarin for Loquat, a fruit tree in the family Rosaceae
- Agua de pipa, a local term for coconut water in Costa Rica, Panama, and Ecuador
- Pipa (frog), a genus popularly known as Surinam toads
- Participatory impact pathways analysis, a project management approach
- Program on International Policy Attitudes, an American research institution
- PIPA Prize, a contemporary art award from Brazil

== See also ==
- Pipas (disambiguation)
- Pippa (disambiguation)
