= Pippa (given name) =

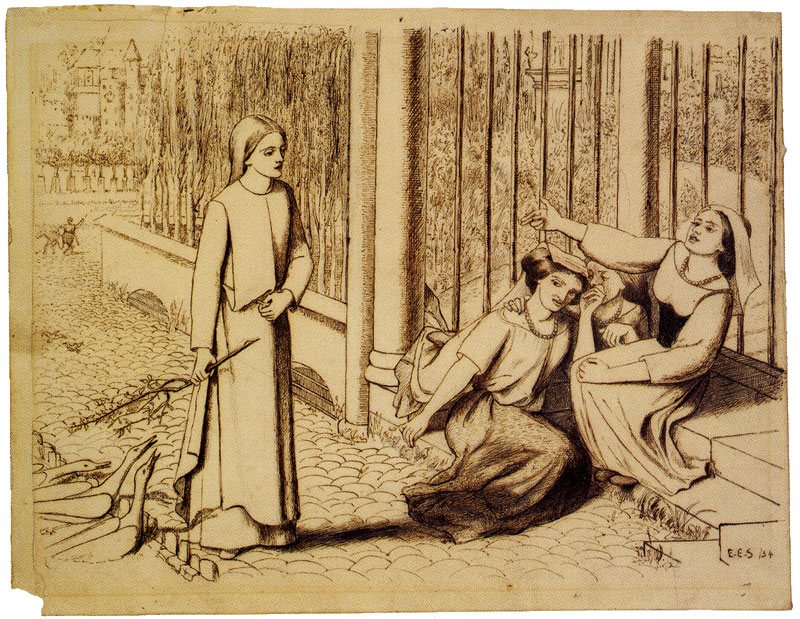
- Pippa Passes, an 1854 illustration by Elizabeth Siddal for Robert Browning's Pippa Passes.
- Pronunciation: PIP-a
- Gender: Feminine

Origin
- Origin: Greek
- Meaning: lover of horses
- Region of origin: English

Other names
- Variant forms: Pip, Pipa
- Related names: Philip, Philippa, Philippe, Philippine

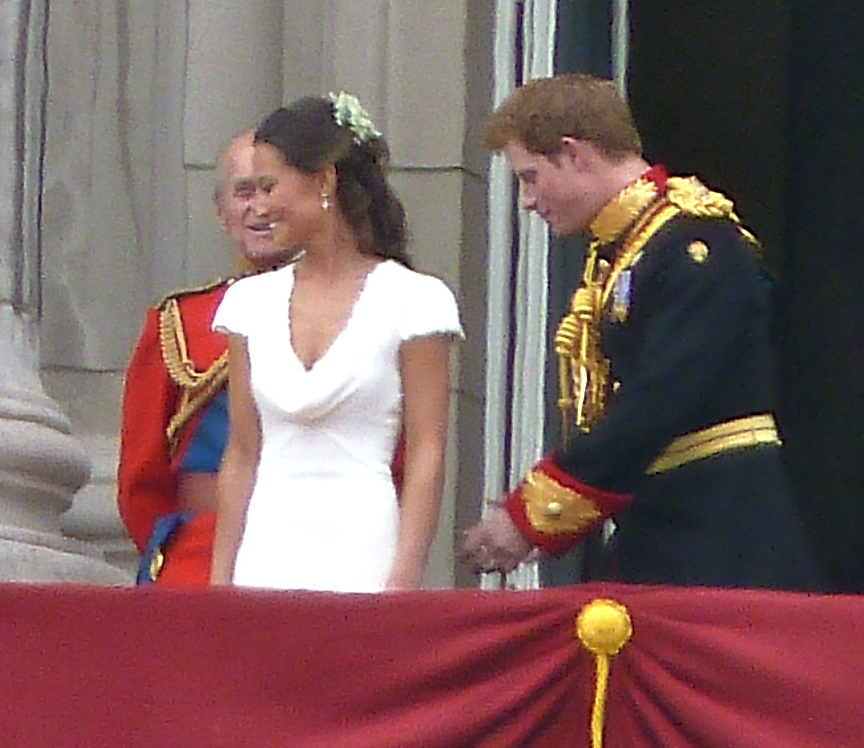
Pippa Middleton, center, with Prince Philip, Duke of Edinburgh and Prince Harry, Duke of Sussex following the 2011 wedding of William, Prince of Wales and Catherine, Princess of Wales.

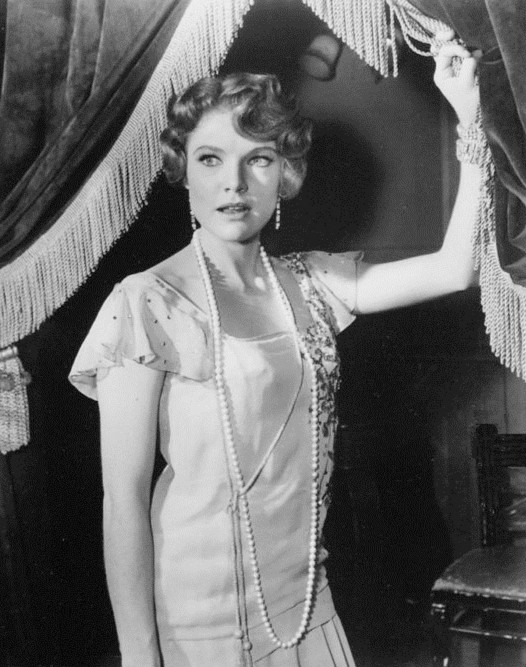
American actress Pippa Scott in 1960.

Pippa is a feminine given name and a short form, usually of Philippa. It came into greater use as an independent name in the Anglosphere following the publication of the 1841 verse drama Pippa Passes by English poet Robert Browning with the well-known lines "God's in his heaven— / All's right with the world!" The character was an innocent Italian girl, though the name is not in common use as a given name in Italy.

== Cultural connotations ==
The name Philippa, or Philip in its vernacular form for both men and women, was used in the British royal family in medieval times. Philippa of Hainault was an early bearer. Pip and Pippa were traditional diminutives of the name. These early associations give the name a classic image with upperclass associations in the Anglosphere. The name has sexual connotations in other cultures. Pippa is a Swedish crude slang term for sexual intercourse and an Italian slang word for masturbation. A similar sounding word in Greek, πίπα, is a crude Greek slang term for fellatio.

== Usage ==
The name has ranked among the top 1,000 names for newborn girls in the United Kingdom since 1996 and among the top 200 since 2012, the year after the wedding of Prince William and Catherine Middleton, at which Pippa Middleton served as her sister's maid of honor and was much photographed and her attractiveness was much commented upon.

== People ==
- Philipa "Pippa" Ailion (born 1947), British theatrical and casting director
- Pippa Bacca (1974–2008), performance artist
- Pippa Bartoletti, British politician
- Philippa "Pippa" Bennett-Warner (born 1988), British actress
- Pippa Black (born 1982), Australian actress
- Pippa Britton (born ca. 1962-63), British retired archer and paralympian
- Pippa "Pips" Bunce, born Philip Bunce (born 1972), British banking executive
- Pippa Catterall, born Peter Catterall (born 1961), British academic historian
- Pippa Coom, New Zealand politician
- Pippa Crerar (born 1976), British journalist
- Pippa Cross (born 1956), English film and television producer
- Pippa Duncan, British Royal Navy officer
- Pippa Evans (born 1982), British comedian
- Philippa "Pippa" Funnell (born 1968), British equestrienne
- Pippa Garner, born Philip Garner (1942–2024), American artist, illustrator, industrial designer, and writer known for making parody forms of consumer products and custom bicycles and automobiles
- Pippa Goldschmidt, British fiction writer
- Pippa Grandison (born 1970), Australian actress and singer
- Pippa Grange, British applied psychologist, author, and consultant
- Pippa Greenwood, British plant pathologist
- Philippa "Pippa" Guard (born 1952), British actress
- Pippa Hackett (born 1974), Irish politician
- Pippa Hale, British contemporary artist
- Philippa "Pippa" Harris (born 1967), British film and television producer
- Pippa Hayward (born 1990), New Zealand field hockey player and Olympian
- Philippa "Pippa" Haywood (born 1961), English actress
- Philippa "Pippa" Hinchley (born 1966), English actress
- Phyllis "Pippa" Latour (1921-2023), South African-born agent of the United Kingdom's clandestine Special Operations Executive (SOE) organisation in France during World War II
- Pippa Little, Scottish poet, reviewer, translator, and editor
- Philippa "Pippa" Maddams (born1974), British former mountain and fell runner
- Philippa "Pippa" Malmgren (born 1962), American technology entrepreneur and economist
- Pippa Mann (born 1983), British race car driver
- Philippa "Pippa" Marrack (born 1945), English immunologist and academic
- Philippa "Pippa" Middleton (born 1983), English socialite, sister of the Princess of Wales
- Pippa Mills, British senior police officer
- Pippa Moore, (born ca. 1973-74), English ballet dancer
- Pippa Nixon (born 1980), English actress
- Pippa Norris (born 1953), British-American political scientist specializing in comparative politics
- Philippa "Pippa" Pearce, British curator of the British Museum
- Philippa "Pippa" Rogerson, British solicitor and academic
- Philippa "Pippa" Savage (born 1981), Australian rower and Olympian
- Philippa "Pippa" Scott (1935–2025), American actress
- Pippa Small, Canadian-born British jeweller, anthropologist and humanitarian
- Philippa "Pippa" Smyth (born 1995), Australian rules footballer
- Phillipa "Pippa" Soo (born 1990), American actress and singer
- Philippa "Pippa" Strachey (1872-1968), British women's suffragist
- Pippa Steel (1948–1992), British actress
- Philippa "Pippa" Stroud, Baroness Stroud (born 1965), Peer in the British House of Lords and leader of conservative think tanks
- Pippa Van Iersel (born 1999), Dutch kite surfer
- Pippa Wetzell (born 1977), New Zealand television personality and journalist
- Pippa Wicks (born circa 1962-63), British businesswoman
- Pippa Wilson (born 1986), English professional sailor
- Pippa Winslow, American-born British actress, singer, and voice artist
- Philippa "Pippa" York, born Robert Millar (born 1958), Scottish journalist and former professional road racing cyclist

== Fictional characters ==
- Philippa "Pippa" Ewell, in the 1981 historical romance novel Judas Kiss by Eleanor Alice Burford
- Pippa "Pip" Fitz-Amobi, in the novel A Good Girl's Guide to Murder by Holly Jackson and the TV series based upon the books
- Pippa Funnell, in the video gaming series Alexandra Ledermann / Pippa Funnell
- Pippa Hailsham-Brown, in the 1954 murder mystery play Spider's Web by Agatha Christie
- Pippa Hatcher, in the 1999 American horror television miniseries Storm of the Century
- Pippa Lee, in the 2009 film The Private Lives of Pippa Lee
- Pippa McKenna, on the American sitcom The Facts of Life
- Pippa Ridley, in the 2004 film Haven
- Pippa Ross, in the Australian soap opera Home and Away
- Pippa Saunders, in the Australian soap opera Home and Away
- Pippa, in the 1841 verse drama Pippa Passes by English poet Robert Browning
- Pippa, the title character of the 1906 play Und Pippa tanzt! by German dramatist Gerhart Hauptmann
- Pippa, in the 2019 film The Goldfinch
- Pippa, in the 2021 American erotic thriller film The Voyeurs
- Pippa the Plane, in the British animated television series Budgie the Little Helicopter

== See also ==
- 648 Pippa, a minor planet orbiting the Sun
- Pippa (doll), a fashion doll manufactured by British toymaker Palitoy between 1972 and 1980
- Giuseppina Pasqualino di Marineo, known as Pippa Bacca (1974-2008), Italian performance and feminist artist and murder victim
- Philippa
- Pippo
