= Pippa =

Pippa may refer to:

== People ==
- Pippa (given name)
- Poppy Bermúdez, Argentine-born Dominican businessman José Armando Bermúdez Pippa (1928-2014)
- Rosalba Pippa (born 1982), Italian singer, songwriter, actress, and television personality
- Kelly Ripa (born 1970), nicknamed Pippa, American talk show host

== Fictional characters ==
- Pippa Cross (Gemma Doyle Trilogy), in books by Libba Bray
- Pippa Ross, in the Australian soap opera Home and Away
- Pippa Saunders, in Home and Away
- Pippa, in the television series Dead Set
- Pippa, the protagonist of The Private Lives of Pippa Lee, a 2009 film
- Pippa Fitz-Amobi, the protagonist of the A Good Girl's Guide to Murder book series
- Pippa, a character in The Goldfinch (novel) and The Goldfinch (film)

== Other uses ==
- Pippa (doll), a British toy doll
- Pippa (film), a 2023 Indian film
- 648 Pippa, a minor planet orbiting the Sun
- PIPPA (Pressurised Pile Producing Power and Plutonium), a codename for the design of the Magnox reactor at Calder Hall nuclear power station

== See also ==
- Pipa (disambiguation)
- Pippo (disambiguation)
