= Forte de São Sebastião (Angra do Heroísmo) =

Fort in the Azores

- Terceira, Central, Azores

Site information
- Type: Fort

Location
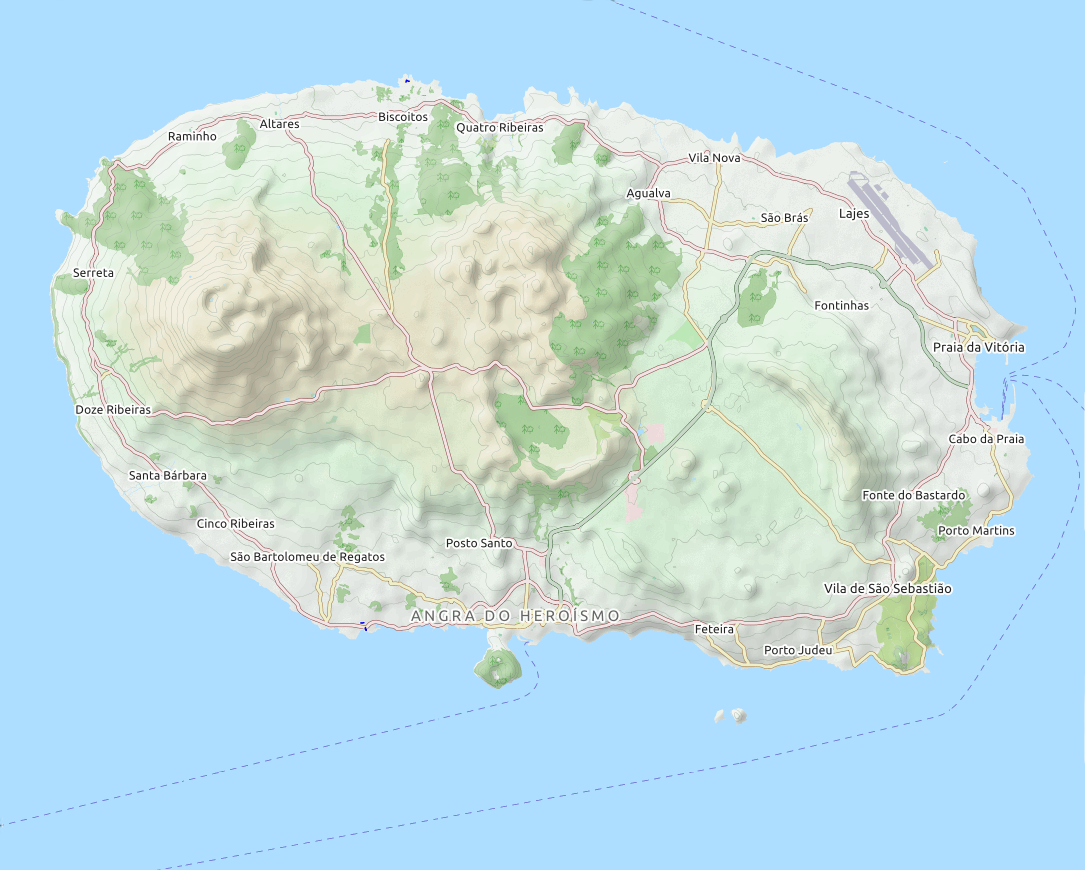
- Location of the fort on Terceira Island
- Coordinates: 38°39′06″N 27°12′44″W

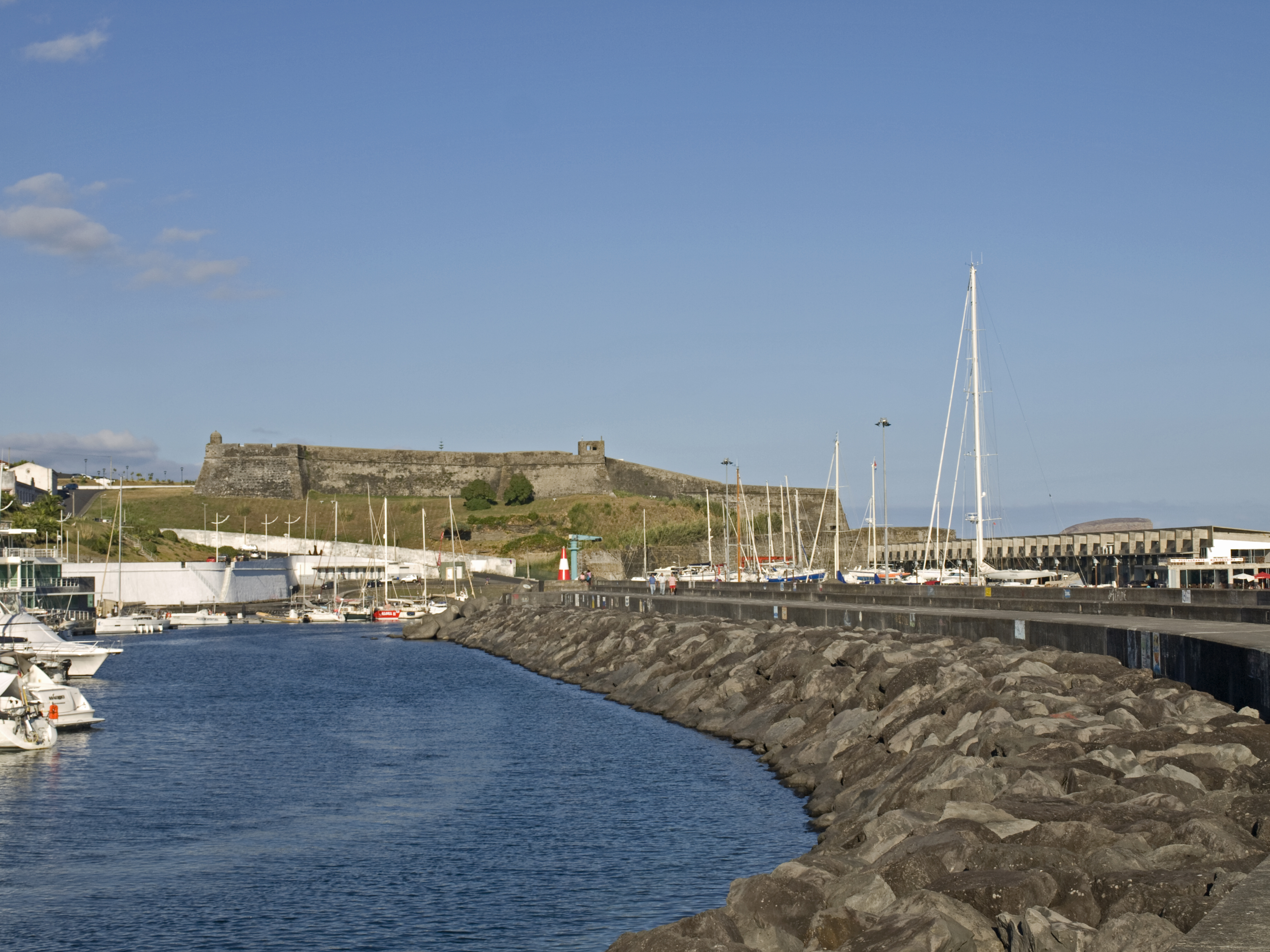
Forte de São Sebastião from the dam Angra

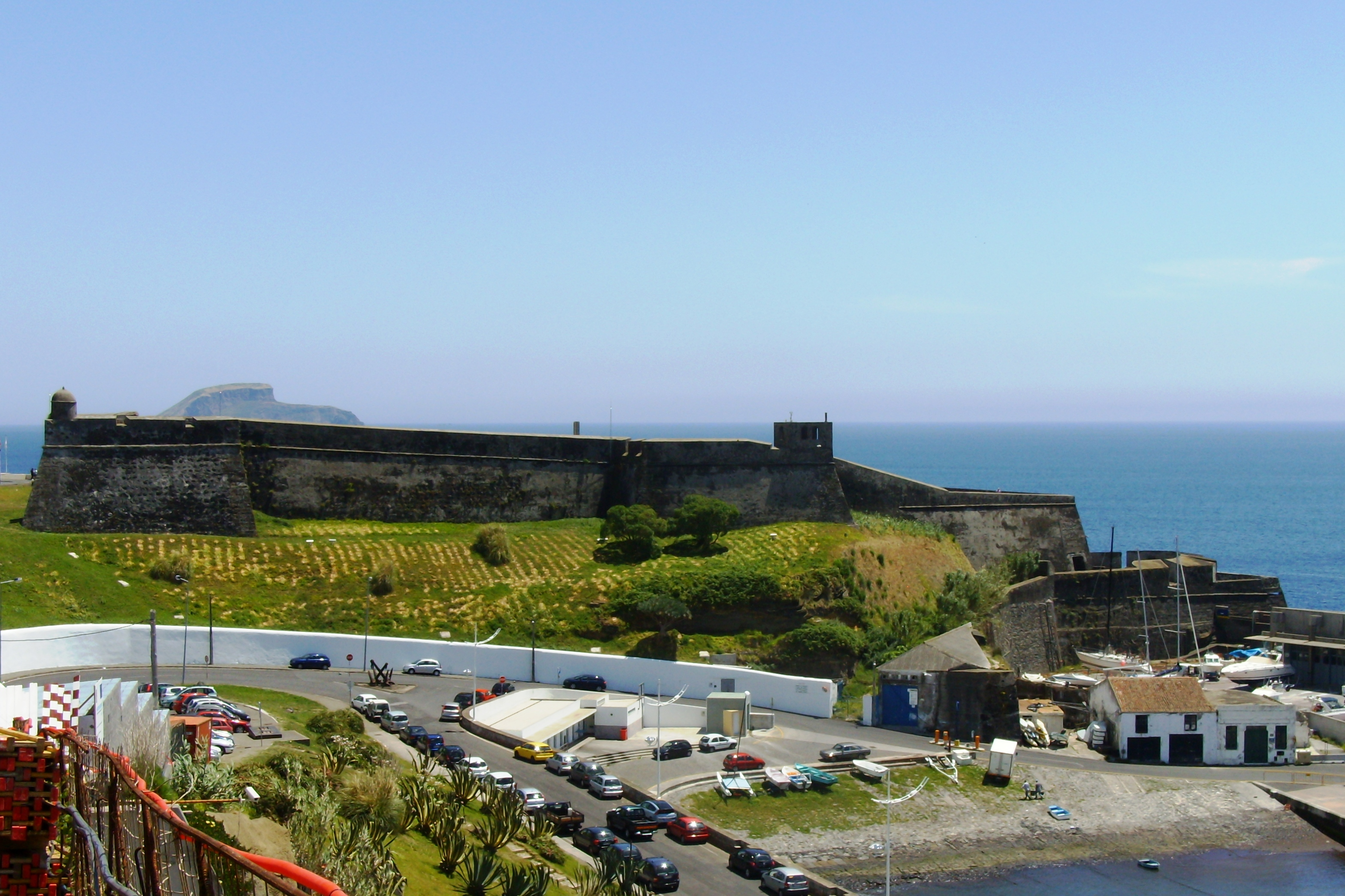
Forte de São Sebastião

Forte de São Sebastião, also referred to as Castelo de São Sebastião or simply Castelinho (lit. 'Little castle'), is a fort located in the port of Pipas, parish of Nossa Senhora da Conceição, in the city and municipality of Angra do Heroísmo, on the south coast of Terceira Island in the Azores.

== History ==
The fort was built in 1580 on a small hill that forms the extreme ESE of the Bay of Angra, in the historic center of the city. It was built at the suggestion of Isidoro de Almeida and designed by architect Tomaz Benedito de Pesaro in an Italian style. This fortress was finished in the time of El-Rei D. Sebastião. Unusually, the fort could participate in a crossfire with São Benedicto (Spanish name for the Fortress of São João Baptista), on Monte Brasil.

This fort represented a new concept for coastal protection. It was the city's first major maritime fortification. It crossed its fires with the Fortress of São João Baptista on Monte Brasil, in defense of Pipas, at the time the most important anchorage and shipyard of the island for the Portuguese India Armadas in the carreira da Índia and the fleets of Brazil, in transit to the Kingdom of Portugal. The importance of its position derived from the ease with which it could protect the bay. On Maundy Thursday 1641, on March 28, in the context of the revolt against the dominant Spanish presence, it was conquered by the company of ordinances of Ribeirinha, commanded by Manuel Jaques de Oliveira.

The fort became a hotel, part of the Pousadas de Portugal group.
