= Pippo (disambiguation) =

Pippo is an Italian given name

Pippo may also refer to:

- Pippo (bishop of Toul), bishop of Toul between 1070 and 1107
- Pentamerone, a variant of "Puss in Boots", written by Giambattista Basile
- Pippo (airplane), an airplane flown over Northern Italy during World War II
- Simonetta Di Pippo, Italian astrophysicist and former Director of the United Nations Office for Outer Space Affairs

== See also ==
- Pippa (disambiguation)
