= San Jose Police Department =

Police agency for San Jose, California

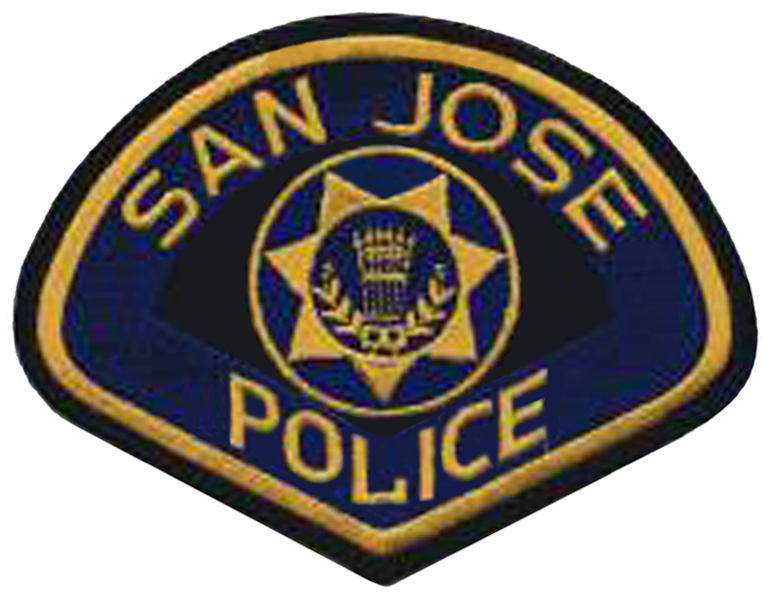
- Patch of the San Jose Police Department

- Badge of the San Jose Police Department
- Abbreviation: SJPD

Agency overview
- Formed: 1849; 177 years ago
- Annual budget: $447 m (2020)

Jurisdictional structure
- Operations jurisdiction: California, USA
- Area: 178.2 square miles (462 km^{2})
- Population: 1,025,350
- General nature: Local civilian police

Operational structure
- Headquarters: 201 W. Mission Street; San Jose, CA 95110
- Police officers: 959
- Civilians: 370
- Agency executive: Paul Joseph, Chief

Facilities
- Stations: 2
- Airbases: 1
- Helicopters: 1
- Fixed Wings: 0

Website
- San Jose Police website

The San Jose Police Department (SJPD) is the police agency for San Jose, California. The San Jose Police Department is led by Chief of Police Paul Joseph.

The department makes its calls for service available to the public; it is the first American city police department to make all 911 calls available via online CrimeReports.com maps. The 911 call data is updated daily.

== History ==
The San Jose Police Department was founded in 1849. During its beginnings, the most common offenses recorded for the department were public intoxication and vagrancy, according to old jailhouse records. In 1880, the department was averaging 120 arrests per month, and the position of police chief was created. The chief also acted as the superintendent of the city jail, and by the late 1880s, the department had gone from 10 officers to 25. In the early 1905s, as the SJPD grew, more rules and regulations were instituted regarding police officers. Officers now needed to go through field training and revolver training.

The department, along with many others in the nation, changed with the introduction of the automobile and the advent of motorcycle units. The motorcycle unit mainly cited people for speeding and other traffic violations. San Jose was one of the first places to use radio and phone technology to help officers perform their duties. In 1925, the city council released the first rules and regulations manual. It was the precursor to the duty manual that the department currently uses. The San Jose Police Academy first started out as a police college for aspiring officers to earn four year bachelor's degrees with an emphasis on criminal justice. Men made up the entire police force up until 1945, when Ida Waalkes became the first female to be a sworn officer with the San Jose Police Department.

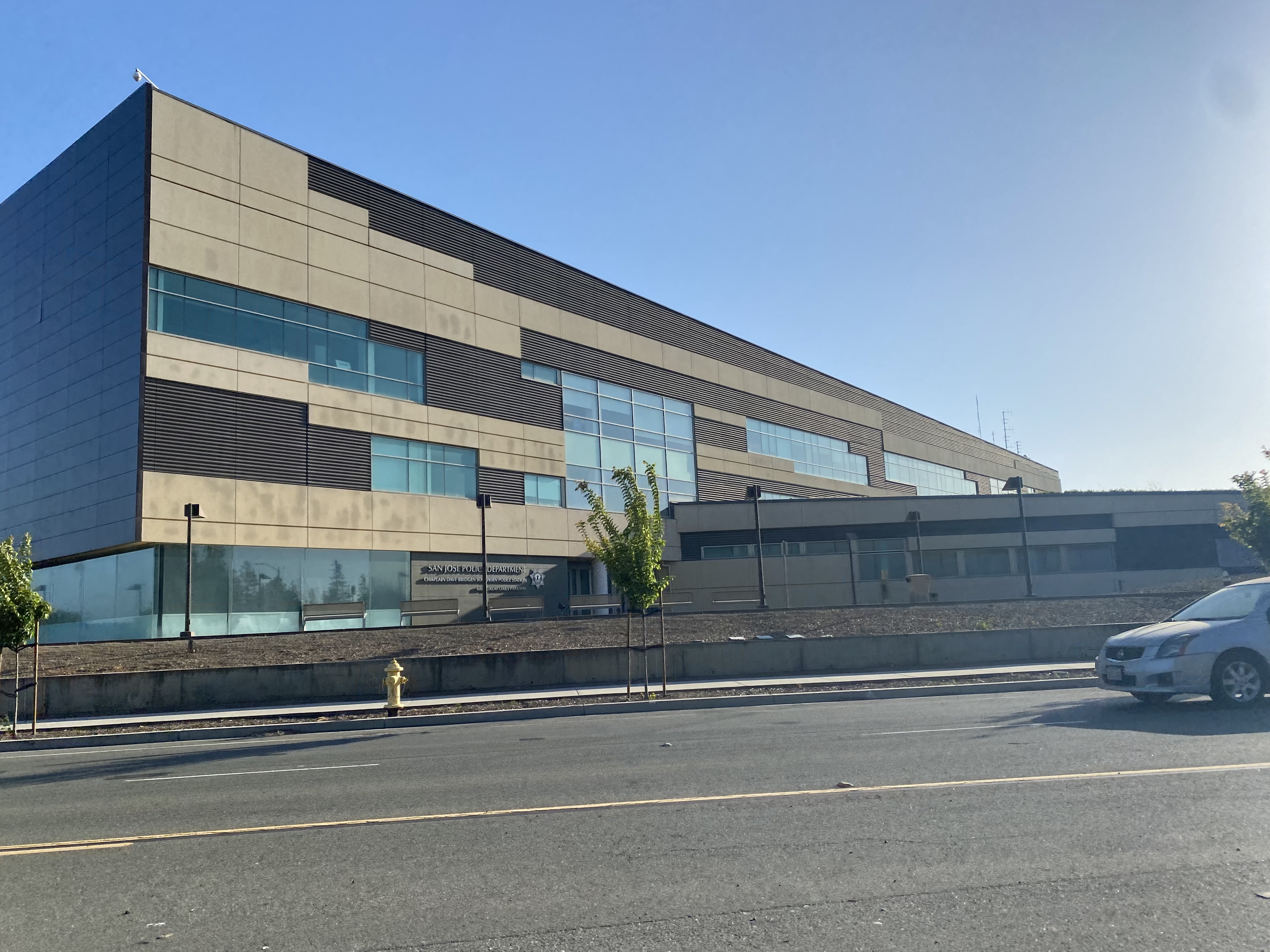
SJPD Southern Police Station & Training Center in the Santa Teresa district of South San Jose.

On December 8, 1941, the SJPD created an own Police Reserve Unit which exists until today, making it one of the oldest organizations of this kind in the United States. SJPD Reserve Officers are California P.O.S.T Basic Police Academy certified and therefore receive exactly the same training, including 500 hours of Field Training, as full-time police officers. As level I reserve officers according to § 832.6(a)(1) California Penal Code, they are sworn peace officers pursuant to § 830.6(a)(1) California Penal Code who have the same duties and responsibilities as regular officers.

Today, the unit consists of over 100 reserve officers and is on call 24 hours, seven days a week. Community policing began to be used by the department in the early 1990s, as specific geographic areas were mapped out and assigned. This enabled officers to get to know the people and communities they patrolled, and is partially credited for keeping San Jose one of the safest large cities in America.

In September 2007, the San Jose Police Department began making all its Calls for Service available to the public through a partnership with Crime Reports.com. San Jose was the first American city to make all 911 calls available via online "CrimeReports.com" maps.

Since fall 2014, the San Jose Police Department maintains a uniformed auxiliary police which consists of 28 Community Service Officers (CSOs) who attend a five-week academy. The SJPD CSO is a civilian position; CSOs thus do not carry firearms and do not perform any enforcement duties. Their tasks are limited to response to lower priority calls, which shall give sworn police officers more time to respond to high risk calls.

== Uniform and equipment ==
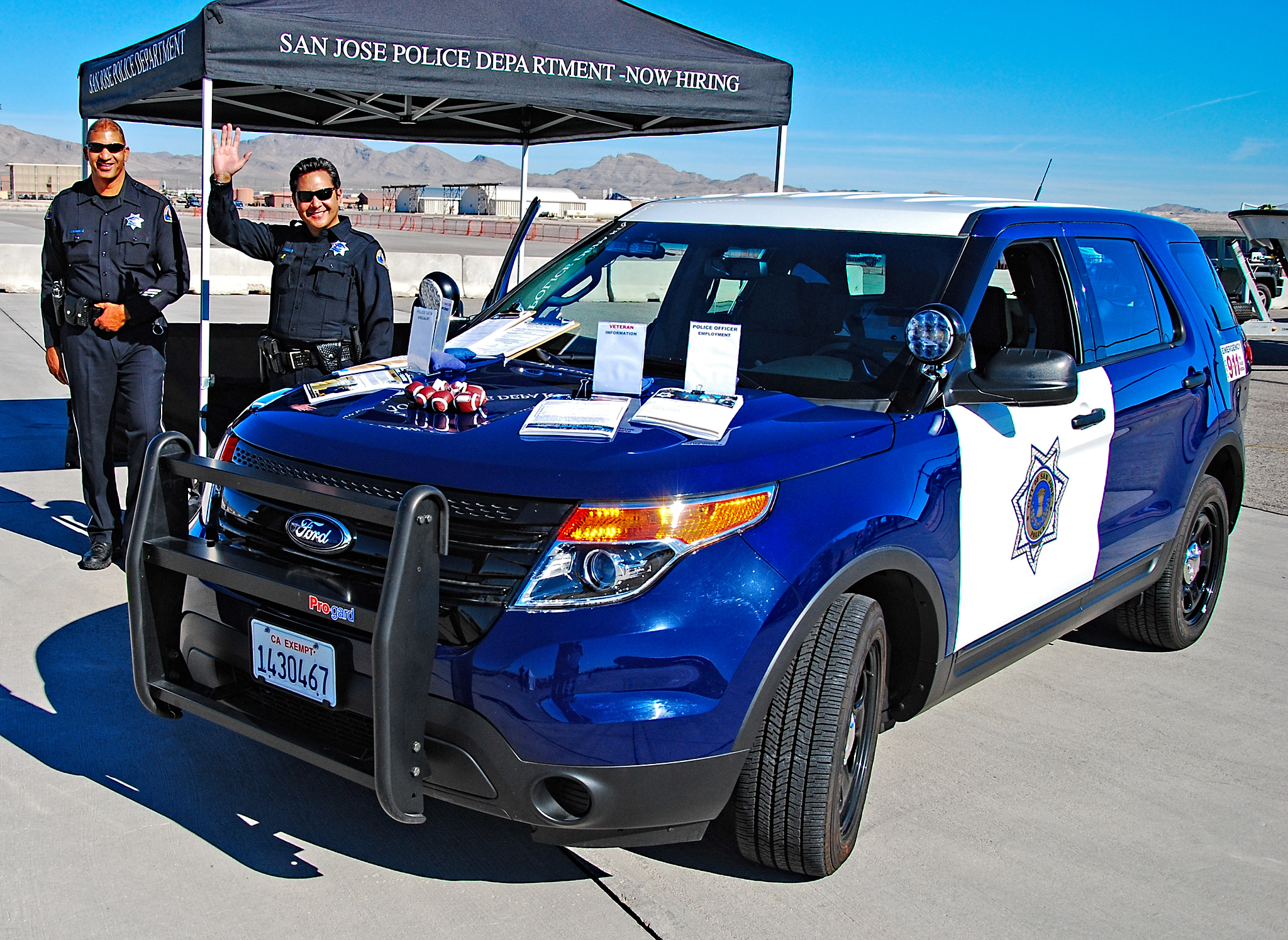
SJPD Ford Police Interceptor Utility.

=== Uniform ===
The uniform of the department consists of a dark navy blue shirt for sworn officers, and a light blue or white shirt for differing civilian classifications. On the left side of the chest is worn the departmental badge, or a patch replica on certain items. The badge of a sworn police officer is a silver seven-point star reading "San Jose Police", the officer's rank, and badge number. Gold-colored badges are issued to higher ranking police officers. Civilian staff are issued eagle-top or oval shaped shields depending on classification. The San Jose Police Department patch is worn on both sleeves, with a rocker denoting classification for civilian staff. Pants are regular navy blue uniform trousers with white piping running down the side of the leg.

=== Weapons and equipment ===
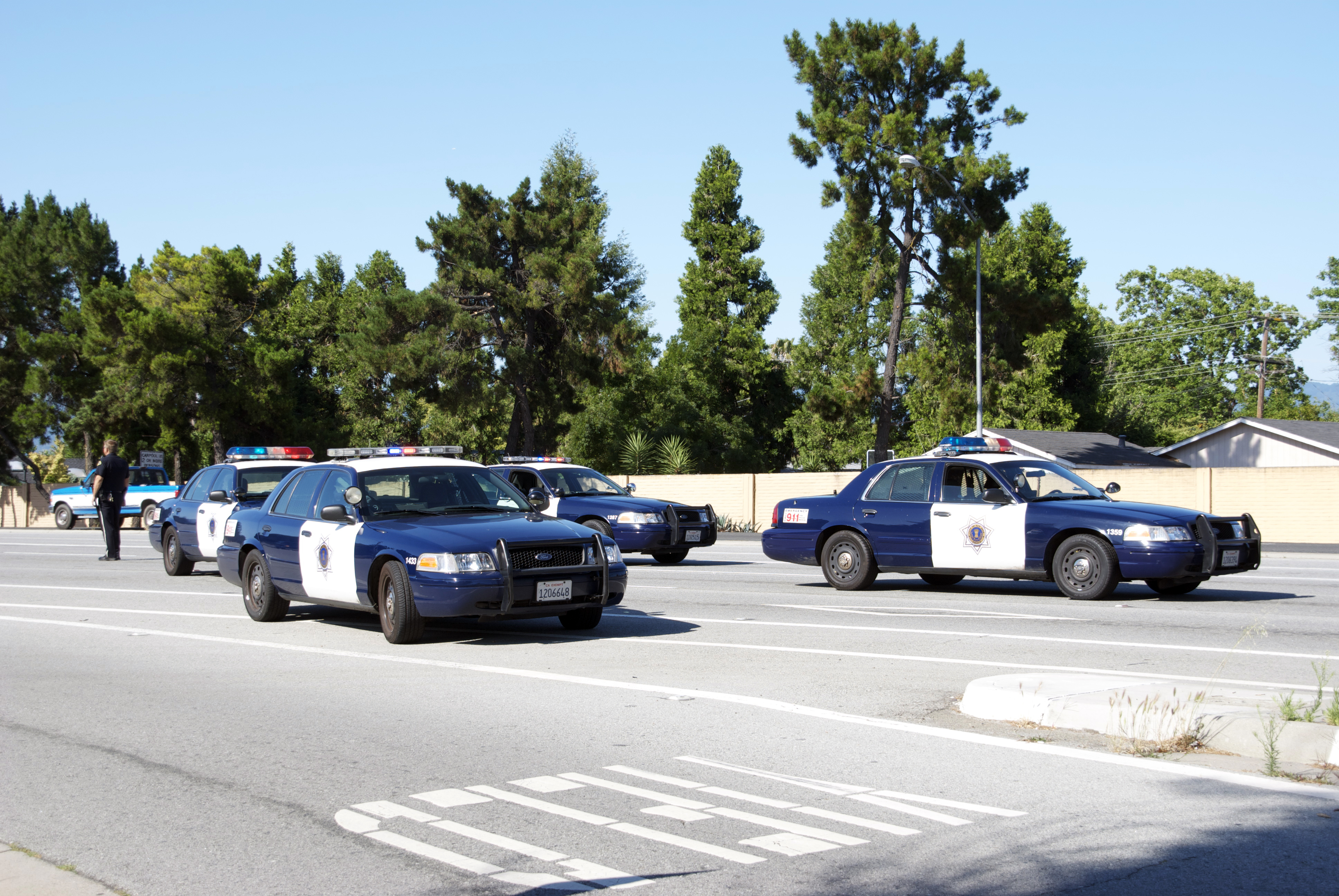
Ford Crown Victoria Police Interceptors in SJPD service.

The San Jose Police Departments officers normally carry tasers. The standard taser for the department is the TASER(R) X26P(TM) Smart Weapon. Officers are issued OC Spray, handcuffs, a baton, flashlight plus a handgun and two spare magazines. The standard issue semi-automatic handgun is a Glock. (Before 2013, it was from SIG Sauer). Squad cars are normally armed with shotguns and officers are allowed to purchase patrol rifles, with individual permission of the chief and a four-day training course. The officers own these weapons and can use them for personal use as well as departmental.

In mid-2014, the department returned a mine-resistant military vehicle to the federal government.

== Department chain of command (Office of the Chief of Police) ==
- Chief Of Police Paul Joseph
- Assistant Chief Of Police Brian Shab
- Deputy Chief Jaime Jimenez, Bureau of Administration
- Deputy Chief Gina Tibaldi, Chief Executive Officer
- Deputy Chief Brandon Sanchez, Bureau of Field Operations
- Deputy Chief Brian Spears, Bureau of Investigations
- Deputy Director Judi Torrico, Bureau of Technical Services

== Police divisions ==
- Foothill Division
- Western Division
- Southern Division
- Central Division

== Controversy ==
In July 2003, Bich Cau Thi Tran was shot and killed in her kitchen by a SJPD officer after brandishing a 10-inch vegetable peeler. The incident led to controversy among San Jose's Vietnamese community. In 2005, the city of San Jose settled the Tran family's lawsuit for $1.8 million.

The week before Halloween 2011, a 27-year-old highly intoxicated man armed with a gun (later determined to be a toy gun) was shot over 20 times by four SJPD officers and wounded after he refused to follow officers commands and grabbed the gun. He was dressed as a surgeon and had a toy gun in his waistband. In 2013, the city settled a lawsuit for $4.95 million, the largest settlement in San Jose involving police conduct.

In 2014, the department had been found to be using high tech cellphone spying systems, commonly referred to as "Stingrays." These devices act like a regular cell phone tower, causing all cell phones in the nearby vicinity to connect to it rather than the real cell site. This gives the user of a Stingray the ability to intercept the conversations and data exchanges of all nearby cellular phone users. It was shown that the federal government gave the department a $500,000 grant for the technology. The SJPD spokesperson refused to comment on the situation.

In March 2014, Officer Geoffrey Graves was accused of raping a woman. He turned himself into Santa Clara County Jail and was arraigned on March 24.

In December 2014, SJPD officer Phillip White made statements on Twitter that he would kill people who would threaten him and his family and that he would be carrying a gun while off duty at movie theaters, in response to protests of the deaths of Michael Brown and Eric Garner. White was subsequently placed on administrative leave. The San Jose Police Association have condemned the comments. In January 2015, prosecutors declined to file charges against White.

In May 2020, in response to the George Floyd protests, the SJPD used crowd dispersal tactics including tear gas and rubber bullets under the instruction of their commander of special operations, Captain Jason Dwyer. San Jose Mayor Sam Liccardo called on the police department to explain its use of tear gas and rubber bullets after widespread criticism of law enforcement tactics during protests against police brutality. The protests started Friday, May 29, 2020, and by the following Monday, “the police department reports having received more than 1,200 citizen complaints related to the protests and was notified that the Office of the Independent Police Auditor had received more than 500.” Captain Dwyer acknowledged use of force never looks good, but said officers had no choice. “If you subtract those things from the equation, then what’s left? We have archaic skirmish lines of police officers with 42-inch hardwood batons,” Dwyer said. “You tell me which one’s going to look worse: people rubbing their eyes and coughing, or officers striking individuals with batons, breaking bones and God knows how many other injuries?” Investigations into this matter are ongoing.

During the protests in May 2020, SJPD officer Jared Yuen drew national attention on social media as videos spread of his behaviour during the George Floyd protests in California against police brutality. Yuen was videoed holding a projectile launcher, telling a protester "Shut up, bitch,” then within seconds, he leaned around another officer to fire a projectile at close range, which caused a fight. In other videos, Yuen is filmed saying: "Let's get this motherfucker", or seen "smirking, licking his lips and rocking back and forth, looking a little too excited to be facing off with protesters", reported San Jose Inside. The videos were viewed over 10 million times, and thousands called for Yuen's firing. SJPD chief Eddie Garcia reacted that Yuen "let his emotions get the best of him, and it's not right", but he also called Yuen a "kid" and "good cop, who has put his life on the line for the city multiple times." As a result, Yuen was removed from protest duties.

Officer Jared Yuen is also alleged to have inappropriately shot another man in the stomach with a rubber bullet. Tim Harper, who said he was observing the protests on May 29, was shown in a viral video assisting police by carrying an injured officer away. Not long after, according to Harper, police shot a teenage boy in the head with a projectile. This prompted Harper to attempt to "walk up peacefully" to question the officers, said Harper, he was "a good distance from" police when Yuen "walked through two officers, shot me, and then stepped behind the other two officers".

Also on May 29, community activist Derrick Sanderlin suffered a ruptured testicle after police shot him with a rubber bullet, despite him being some distance away and displaying no aggressive behavior. Sanderlin said he put himself between protesters and police after he saw police shooting protesters at close range. The officers were then seen deliberately aiming at Sanderlin, and firing multiple times. Jared Yuen was one of the San Jose officers involved in this incident, although is unclear whether Yuen himself had fired at Sanderlin. Sanderlin himself had worked as a trainer of police recruits on how to reduce bias towards minorities.

== Line of duty deaths ==
Since the establishment of the San Jose Police Department, 13 Police Officers and one Community Service Officer have died while on duty.

- 9 by gunshot
- 3 by traffic collision
- 1 by electrocution
- 1 by aircraft accident

=== Sergeant Morris VanDyck Hubbard - July 12, 1924 ===
On July 12, 1924, at approximately 1820 hours, a citizen reported a man forcibly taking a female from a residence on East Julian Street. Sergeant Hubbard, a seven-year veteran, and Officer Murphy, both plain clothes detectives, responded to East Julian Street.

Sergeant Hubbard and Officer Murphy located the suspect and the victim at Julian and 15th Streets. Sergeant Hubbard drew his gun and ordered the suspect to surrender. The suspect turned and fired a single shot. Neither detective was struck. Sergeant Hubbard, Officer Murphy and Suspect Mays were then involved in a shootout. As a result of the shootout, Sergeant Hubbard was struck in the abdomen by Suspect Mays. The suspect was struck in the wrist and chest and died as a result of his injuries.

Sergeant Hubbard was transported to San Jose Hospital. Prior to surgery Sgt. Hubbard was conscious, however, later died in surgery.

=== Police Officer John Buck - April 5, 1933 ===
On February 27, 1933, at approximately 2040 hours, Officer John Buck and Officer Clinton Moon were patrolling in the area of Julian Street and North 12th Street in a patrol vehicle. The officers spotted a suspicious vehicle occupied by two males that Officer Buck believed were associated with an armed robbery that occurred the previous night. He ordered the car to pull over at South Market and Post Streets.

Officer Buck approached the vehicle while Officer Moon remained in the driver’s seat of the police car to radio in the stop. Officer Buck reached the passenger side of the car and started to open the passenger door when the passenger fired multiple rounds from a revolver striking Officer Buck. As he was going down, Officer Buck was able to pull the suspect out of the car and onto the ground. Officer Moon then fired at the suspect and struck him several times.

Officer Buck was severely injured and transported to the hospital where he remained for five weeks. Officer Buck died on April 5, 1933 at 6:25 PM despite lifesaving efforts by doctors.

Officer Buck’s badge was lost at the scene and never recovered.

=== Police Officer John Covalesk - November 15, 1950 ===
On the night of November 15, 1950, Officer Covalesk was working a midnight walking beat in the downtown area. At approximately 0500 hours, he called dispatch to check in as he was required, every hour, to ensure his safety.

At approximately 0540 hours, Officer Covalesk located a door at 42 East San Fernando that had been pried open. As Officer Covalesk entered the building, the suspect, who had been hiding inside, opened fire. Officer Covalesk was struck twice in the chest. As he went down, Officer Covalesk returned fire striking the suspect twice. The suspect then stood over the still-conscious Officer Covalesk and fired one more round killing him.

The suspect was taken into custody approximately 18 hours later in Emeryville. He was convicted and sentenced to life in prison.

=== Police Officer Richard E. Huerta - August 6, 1970 ===
On August 6, 1970, at approximately 0130 hours, Officer Huerta made a traffic stop at 11th and Empire Streets. Officer Huerta directed the driver he had stopped to sit in the passenger seat of the police car while he sat in the driver’s seat to write the ticket. At this time, another vehicle had stopped behind Officer Huerta with its lights off. The suspect then approached Officer Huerta’s police vehicle from the passenger side and through the passenger window fired 6 rounds and fled the scene. Officer Huerta was struck multiple times.

The driver Officer Huerta had stopped rushed to the Santa Clara County Sheriff’s Office and reported the incident. San Jose officers responded to the scene and found Officer Huerta seriously wounded. Officer Huerta was transported to the hospital where he later succumbed to his injuries.

During the search for the suspect, San Jose Officers located him in a backyard on 12th Street and took him into custody. The suspect confessed to shooting Officer Huerta and was convicted of 1st degree murder and sentenced to life in prison.

=== Police Officer Robert White - January 27, 1985 ===
On January 27, 1985, Officer White was working the midnight shift. At 0200 hours, a vehicle accident occurred on Tumble Way at Old Piedmont Road. A vehicle drove into the side yard of a residence on Tumble Way and struck a large metal box knocking it off its concrete base. Communications broadcast the accident and Officer White answered the call even though it was not in his district. He was the first to arrive and began investigating the accident.

The large metal box that had been struck by the vehicle was a 12,000 volt PG&E transferring station used as backup power for the entire neighborhood. The equipment had been designed to shut down in the event of any damage, however, it malfunctioned and remained “hot” electrifying the pickup. As Officer White touched the front bumper of the vehicle, he became a grounding point and was electrocuted.

Two nearby citizens pulled Officer White’s body away from the vehicle and started CPR. Despite the efforts of citizens, fellow officers, paramedics and doctors, Officer White was pronounced dead at 0359 hours.

=== Police Officer Henry Bunch - July 29, 1985 ===
On July 29, 1985, at approximately 0900 hrs, Officers Bunch and Officer Bridges stopped a suspected drunk driver. The driver, identified as suspect Robert Ordonez, was taken into custody without incident and transported to AIB. Suspect Ordonez had a long history of violent behavior to include drug convictions and armed robbery.

Once at AIB, Officer Bridges secured his gun in the gun locker and Officer Bunch remained armed. As they began to process the suspect, the officers realized that they needed additional paperwork from their patrol car. Officer Bridges retrieved the paperwork while Officer Bunch remained inside of AIB. While inside AIB, suspect Ordonez attacked Officer Bunch and disarmed him. Officer Bridges heard a gunshot and ran back into AIB. Officer Bridges saw the suspect standing over Officer Bunch and holding a revolver.

Unarmed, Officer Bridges attacked the suspect and a fight for the gun ensued. During the struggle, suspect Ordonez was shot and killed. Officer Bunch sustained a single gunshot wound and was the sixth San Jose Police Officer killed in the line of duty.

=== Police Officer Robert Wirht - September 8, 1988 ===
On September 8, 1988, Officer Wirht was assigned to the Traffic Enforcement Unit as a motor officer. At approximately 2000 hours, Officer Wirht was conducting radar enforcement on San Felipe Road and Fowler Road. Officer Wirht detected a car traveling north on San Felipe Road at an excessive speed and decided to take enforcement action.

Moments earlier, another officer conducted a vehicle stop just north of Officer Wirht’s position. As traffic approached the scene of the first car stop, drivers began to slow in order to pass safely. Unfortunately, a driver traveling in the number two lane did not observe the traffic slowing and in a last minute attempt to avoid a rear-end collision, the driver veered into the number one lane. Officer Wirht attempted to stop, but his motorcycle collided with her vehicle.

As a result of the collision, Officer Wirht suffered severe head trauma and was pronounced dead at the hospital shortly after.

=== Police Officers Gene Simpson and Gordon Silva - January 20, 1989 ===
On January 20, 1989, Officer Gene Simpson was assigned to work the downtown area on day shift. Shortly before noon, Officer Simpson received a call of a homeless male acting strangely and causing a disturbance at Fifth and Santa Clara Streets. Upon arrival, Officer Simpson made contact with the suspect.

The suspect immediately attacked Officer Simpson and during the struggle, both fell to the ground. The suspect disarmed Officer Simpson forcing Officer Simpson to run and take cover. Officer Simpson then broadcast that the suspect had his gun and was firing at him.

Officer Simpson then tracked the suspect so he could direct incoming units. At some point, the suspect realized that Officer Simpson was nearby and started to chase him around cars while shooting at him. Officer Simpson was hit and went down. The suspect fired again at close range killing him instantly.

Numerous officers responded to the scene and were confronted by the suspect firing at them. In the thirty-second gun battle that ensued, the suspect was struck numerous times. Three of the rounds fatally wounded the suspect. As the gun battle ended, Officer Gordon Silva was located down on the sidewalk. Officer Silva was transported to San Jose Hospital where he succumbed to his injuries.

=== Police Officer Desmond Casey - October 25, 1999 ===
On October 25, 1999, Desmond Casey was attempting to duplicate a mechanical problem he experienced with AIR1 two nights prior which caused him to perform an emergency landing at Reid Hillview Airport. The mechanical problem could not be duplicated and all systems were functioning properly. Officer Casey and a certified mechanic decided to fly the aircraft back to Mineta San Jose International Airport for further tests. While on final approach to the airport, AIR1 went unexpectedly out of control. Officer Casey struggled with the controls and guided the helicopter to a location north of Highway 880 and The Alameda where no one on the ground would be injured. Despite Officer Casey’s heroic maneuver, the helicopter crashed landed killing Officer Casey and the mechanic on impact.

=== Police Officer Jeffrey Fontana - October 28, 2001 ===
On October 28, 2001, Officer Fontana was assigned to the midnight shift (71A4) in the Southern Division. At 0200 hours, Officer Fontana and other officers responded to a call of a disturbance involving a fight and weapons on Rotterdam Lane. Two of the subjects that fled the disturbance were identified as Deshawn Campbell and Rodney McNary. At 0415 hours, Officer Fontana and a teammate decided to report write and as they traveled eastbound on Blossom Hill Road, his teammate noticed that Officer Fontana was no longer behind him. Officer Fontana had followed a vehicle into a residential neighborhood which pulled into the driveway of a residence at a dead-end street. Officer Fontana pulled in behind the vehicle and approached on foot. The driver of the vehicle fired a single shot from a handgun fatally striking Officer Fontana. The suspect then fled the scene on foot.

A 9-1-1 call was then received reporting that an officer was down. Officer Fontana was the first unit assigned by communications to respond to the call. After he did not respond to the radio, responding units found him lying next to his patrol vehicle. Officer Fontana was pronounced at the scene.

Suspect Campbell was identified the night of the incident and was taken into custody days later. On May 20, 2009, Suspect Campbell was found guilty of second degree murder.

=== Police Officer Michael J. Johnson - March 24, 2015 ===
On March 24, 2015, Officer Michael Johnson, a 14 year veteran, was assigned to work patrol District Lincoln. At approximately 1848 hours, Officer Johnson responded to the 2600 block of Senter Road on the report of an intoxicated, possibly suicidal subject at an apartment. While on scene, officers learned that the subject possibly had access to two handguns. Officer Johnson along with other officers set up a perimeter around the apartment and took cover behind vehicles. The subject exited the apartment onto a second floor balcony and fired multiple shots without warning. One shot struck Officer Johnson, killing him instantly. Another officer returned fire and killed the subject. His heroic efforts most likely saved other lives that day.

=== Police Officer Michael J. Katherman - June 14, 2016 ===
On June 14, 2016, Officer Michael Katherman was assigned to the Traffic Enforcement Unit (TEU). Officer Katherman and other TEU officers were working targeted enforcement in the area of North Tenth and Hedding Streets. At approximately 1622 hours, Officer Katherman was traveling north on North Tenth Street on his police motorcycle. As he approached Horning Street, a mini van attempted to turn left from southbound North Tenth Street onto eastbound Horning Street. The mini van drove into Officer Katherman’s pathway and caused a collision causing Officer Katherman to strike the vehicle and roadway.

Several citizens observed the collision and stopped to assist. One of the citizens used Officer Katherman’s police radio to call for assistance. Other officers soon arrived and with the assistance of citizens, began rendering first aid. Officer Katherman was transported to Regional Medical Center where he succumbed to his injuries.

=== Community Service Officer Long Pham - August 3, 2024 ===
On August 3, 2024, Community Service Officer Long Pham was conducting traffic control for a collision that occurred on Monterey Road near Palm Avenue. An errant driver drove through the road closure and struck CSO Pham and CSO Veronica Baer. Despite life-saving efforts of first responders and medical staff, CSO Pham succumbed to his injuries at a local hospital. CSO Baer sustained major injuries and was hospitalized in critical condition. The driver who struck CSO Pham was arrested at the scene and was arrest for driving under the influence.

== See also ==
- Fantasy flight—SJPD's Air Support Unit operated fantasy flights 2005–2007
- List of law enforcement agencies in California
