= Sutherland, New South Wales =

Sutherland
- Suburb
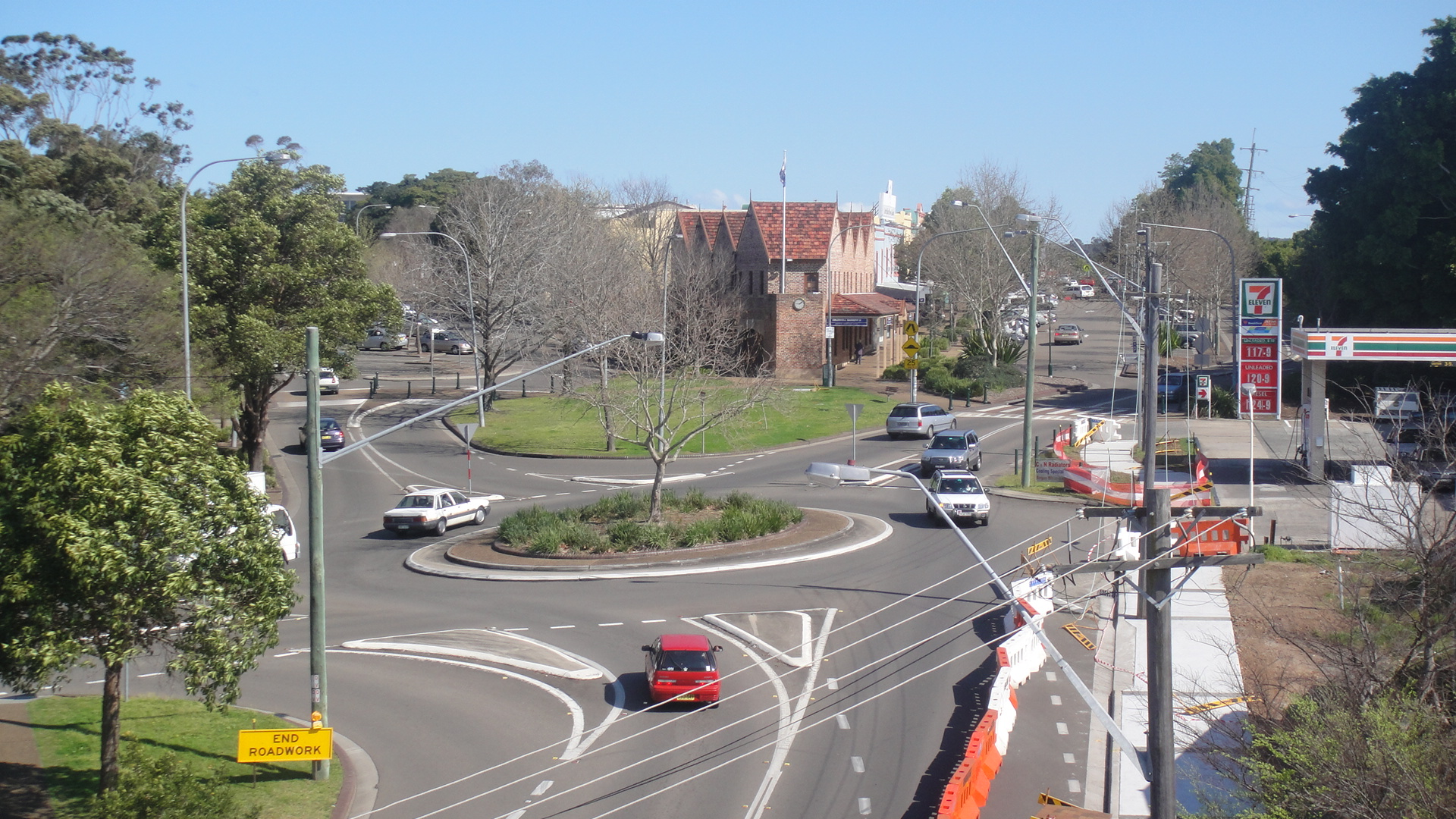
- Overlooking Sutherland

- Interactive map of Sutherland
- Coordinates: 34°01′59″S 151°03′30″E
- Country: Australia
- State: New South Wales
- City: Sydney
- LGA: Sutherland Shire
- Location: 26 km (16 mi) south of Sydney CBD; 55 km (34 mi) north of Wollongong
- Established: 1906

Government
  - State electorates: Miranda; Heathcote
  - Federal divisions: Hughes; Cook
- Elevation: 113 m (371 ft)

Population
  - Total: 11,570 (2021 census)
- Postcode: 2232
Suburbs around Sutherland
Bonnet Bay	Jannali	Kareela
Woronora	Sutherland	Kirrawee
Woronora Heights	Loftus	Royal National Park

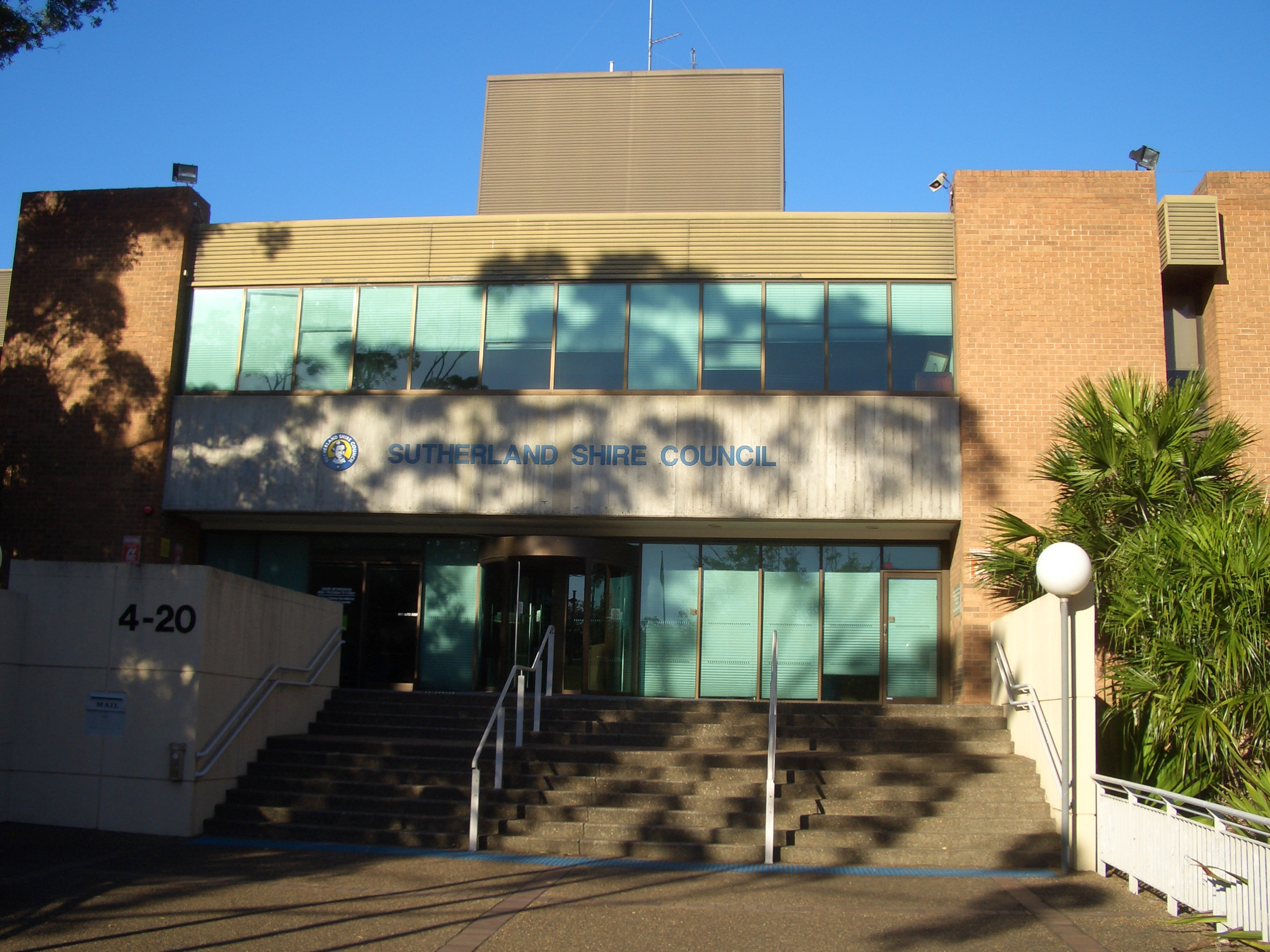
Sutherland Shire Council

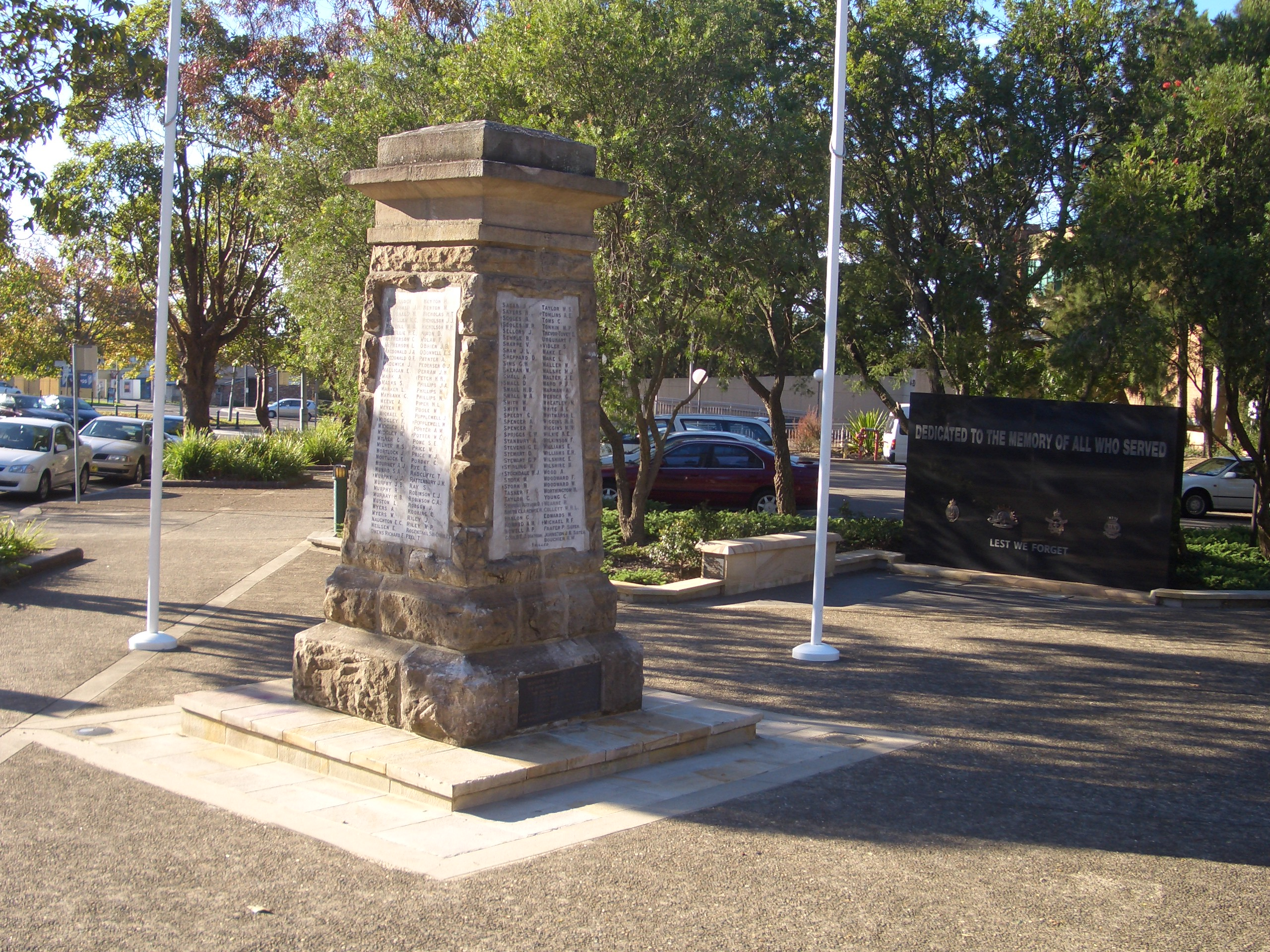
Sutherland War Memorial

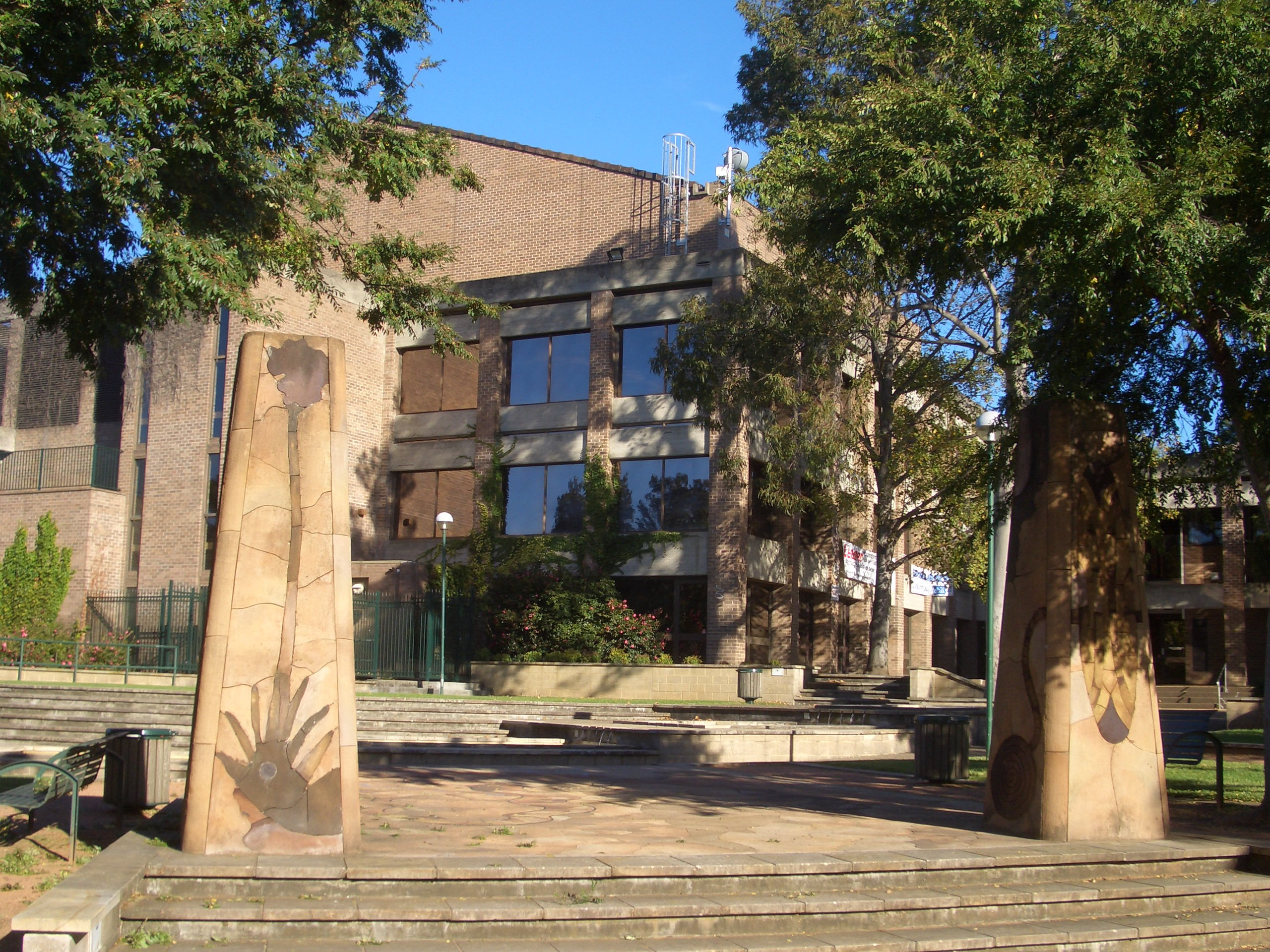
Sutherland Entertainment Centre

Sutherland is a suburb in southern Sydney, in the state of New South Wales, Australia. Sutherland is located 26 kilometres south of the Sydney central business district and is the administrative centre for the local government area of the Sutherland Shire.

== History ==
There are two theories for the origin of the Sutherland name:

- It is suggested that the name was taken from able seaman Forby Sutherland, who died on Captain Cook's Endeavour voyage. Sutherland Point at Kurnell is named after him, but there's no direct connection of him to the Sutherland Shire district.
- Thomas Mitchell as surveyor general in 1835 named the first parish south of the Georges River as the "Parish of Southerland" (South with an "o"). But it appeared in a later government gazette spelt Sutherland, losing the significance of the name.

Thomas Holt (1811–1888) purchased 13,000 acres (53 km^{2}) in the 1860s that stretched from Sutherland to Cronulla. The Sutherland area was originally heavily timbered and timber-cutting became the first industry. Holt initiated many commercial projects including timber cutting, coal mining, sheep farming and oyster farming. He built a forty-room mansion called Sutherland House in 1868 at Sylvania, on the bank of Gwawley Bay. The mansion was destroyed by fire in 1918, thought to have been deliberately lit.

The first road through the area was South Road constructed in 1842. Later Illawarra Road was built along the ridges of high land to the Woronora River. The Princes Highway became the main thoroughfare through Sutherland, linking Sydney to the Illawarra region.

The railway line was constructed in the 1880s and development followed. Residents lived in humpies or tents in the bush. Once the land was cleared, a township developed around the railway station. In 1886 there were only four permanent buildings: the railway station, the station master's residence, the railway keeper's cottage and a general store run by a man called Bramley. The post office opened on 1 September 1886 and a school began classes in 1887. In 1906, the shire of Sutherland was proclaimed and the name Sutherland was officially declared. The first meetings were held in the shire clerk's home and the Council Chambers were built in 1915. By the 1920s, steam trams operated between Cronulla and Sutherland.

=== Woronora Memorial Park ===
In 1897, land was set aside west of Sutherland station for a denominational cemetery, as an alternative to a site at Kurnell, which would have required a long branch line. A single track line 822 metres (2,697 ft) long was constructed next to the station and opened on 13 June 1900. A single platform 134.1 m (440.0 ft) long and a loop for engines were included. The first funeral had taken place earlier that year, with the casket arriving by train from Mortuary station in the city. However, due to the advent of the motor car and motorised funerals, funerals by train eventually fell out of favour, with the result that the line closed on 23 May 1947, with no funeral having taken place for some years beforehand. The line and platform were subsequently demolished and removed; no remains, apart from the original formation coming from the main line, are visible today.

== Commercial area ==
Sutherland is a mostly residential area with a shopping centre located close to Sutherland station. Some commercial developments are also located on the Princes Highway. As the administrative centre of the Sutherland Shire, Sutherland hosts facilities such as a general purpose entertainment centre where citizenship ceremonies take place, a community centre, local government council offices and Sutherland Library, a major central library. Woronora Cemetery sits on the western border of the suburb.

Stapleton's butchery closed in 2017. It had opened in Sutherland in 1896.

== Transport ==
Sutherland station is a junction on the Illawarra railway line of the Sydney Trains network. The main line runs south to Waterfall and Kiama and north to Bondi Junction, and a branch line runs east to Cronulla.

When the Southern Freeway (also known as the F6) was built linking Sydney to Wollongong, the Princes Highway was diverted away from the centre of Sutherland using Acacia Road. An F6 extension has been proposed for many years, which would link Sutherland to the Captain Cook Bridge via Miranda and onto the Southern Cross Drive via Brighton-Le-Sands.

== Schools ==
Local schools in the area including public, Catholic and private schools include:

- Sutherland Public School
- Sutherland North Public School
- Minerva School
- St Patrick's College
- St Patrick's Primary School

== Churches ==
There are 8 churches located in Sutherland which include:

- St Patrick's Catholic Church
- St John the Baptist Anglican Church
- St Andrews Presbyterian Church
- Sutherland Uniting Church
- Good Shepherd Lutheran Church Sutherland
- Christadelphian Church
- Shirelive Church (Pentecostal)
- Sutherland Presbyterian Reformed Church

== Parks ==
Prince Edward Park, Sutherland Park, Waratah Park, Peace Park, Forby Sutherland Memorial Garden, Sutherland Community Gardens, Clio Street Reserve, Glencoe Street Reserve, Gray Street Reserve, Leonay Street Reserve.

Prince Edward Park is a large park situated between the Woronora River and Sutherland. Along the river, a cleared area was created as a recreational park, with facilities for boating and fishing. It is also the location for the Sutherland Region Girl Guides canoeing facility, Woronora Scout Group and the Woronora Life Saving Club. Going towards Sutherland, the park is natural Eucalyptus bushland, with some walking trails.

== Sport and recreation ==
Sutherland is represented by the Sutherland-Loftus Pirates in the Illawarra Rugby League competition. The club, founded in 1913 as one of the oldest clubs in the state, plays its home games at Sutherland Oval. The club's junior teams compete in the Cronulla-Sutherland District Rugby Football League.

Sutherland Leisure Centre located on Rawson Avenue features a 50-metre heated outdoor pool, an international size water polo pool and a multi-functional family fun and recreation area incorporating both a 50-metre and 25-metre indoor pool, spa and steamroom. The pool is home to the swim club SLC Aquadot The gymnasium offers fitness equipment, fitness classes, boxing/fitness circuit, martial arts room and beach volleyball court.

Since 1963 Sutherland Oval has been the home ground of the North Sutherland Rockets. The club competes in the Sutherland Shire Football Association Competition.

== Population ==
According to the 2021 census of Population, there were 11,570 people in Sutherland.

- Aboriginal and Torres Strait Islander people made up 1.6% of the population.
- 71.1% of people were born in Australia. The next most common countries of birth were England 3.4%, China 2.0%, New Zealand 1.5%, India 1.3% and Philippines 1.3%.
- 76.3% of people only spoke English at home. Other languages spoken at home included Mandarin 2.2%, Spanish 1.6%, Russian 1.5%, Cantonese 1.4% and Nepali 0.9%.
- The most common responses for religion were No Religion 37.6%, Catholic 22.5% and Anglican 13.7%.

== Notable people ==
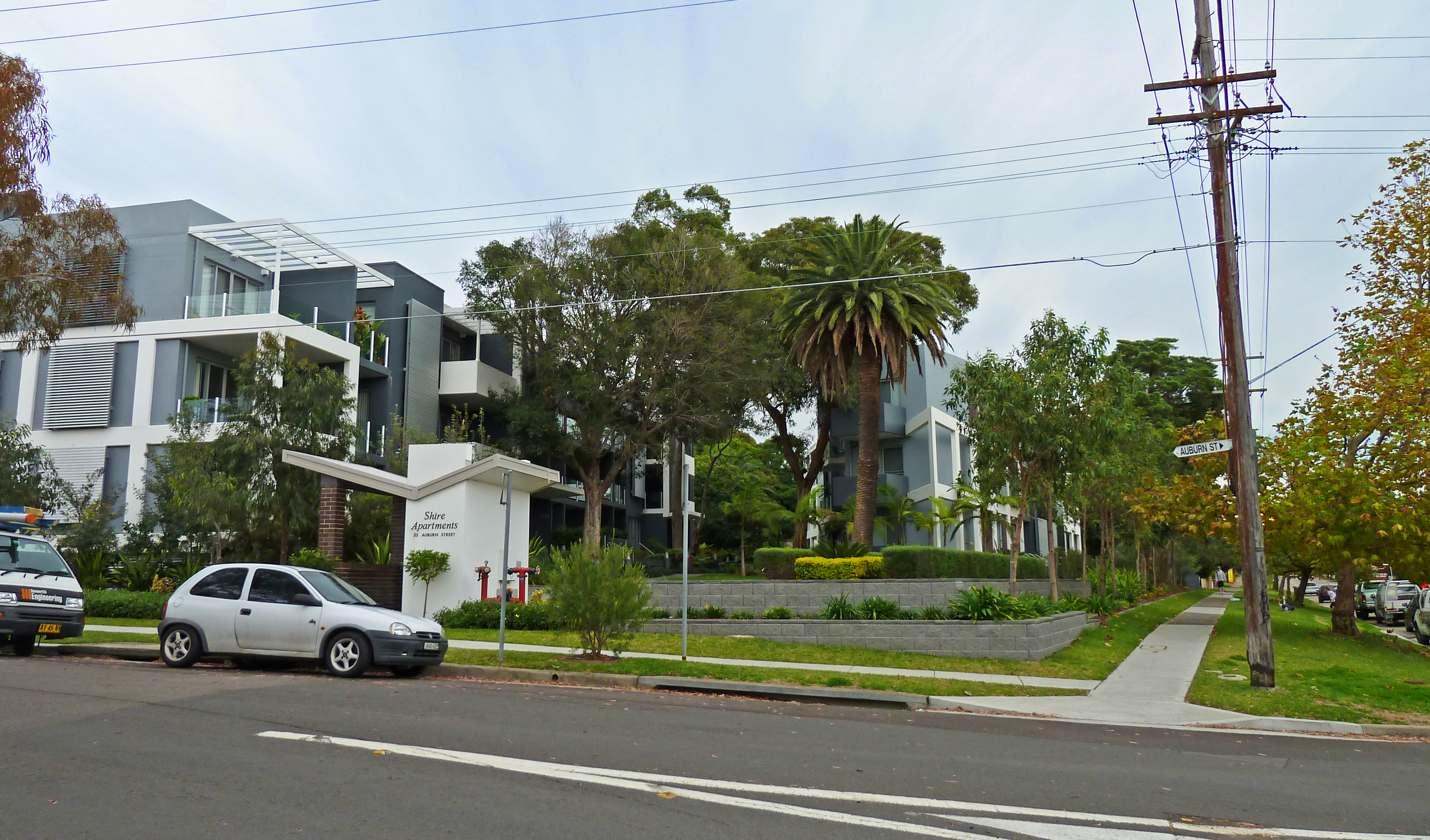
Shire Apartments, Auburn Street

- Russell Aitken, rugby league footballer
- Fred Anderson, rugby league footballer
- Mitch Brown, rugby league footballer
- William Carpenter, politician
- Dylan Caton, soccer player
- Jaime Chapman, rugby league footballer
- Stuart Clark, international cricketer
- Bill Collins, television presenter
- Damien Cook, rugby league footballer
- Johnno Cotterill, water polo player
- Andrew Ettingshausen, rugby league footballer
- Brendan Gan, soccer player
- Alex Gersbach, soccer player
- Rochelle Gilmore, racing cyclist
- Margaret Packham Hargrave, writer, poet, former Sutherland Shire Councillor
- Matt Hilder, rugby league footballer
- Henry Holloway, rugby league footballer and coach
- Talei Holmes, rugby league footballer
- Sam Isemonger, rugby league footballer
- Keiran Kerr, rugby league footballer
- Kid Courageous, Australian pop punk band
- Steve Kneen, rugby league footballer
- Danielle Le Ray, Australian rhythmic gymnast
- Charmaine Mason, cricketer
- George Miller, Chief Industrial Magistrate of NSW
- Craig Moller, basketballer
- Jye Mullane, rugby league footballer
- Kevin Naiqama, rugby league footballer
- Wes Naiqama, rugby league footballer
- Mark O'Neill, cricketer
- Arthur Pappas, rugby league footballer
- Neil Piccinelli, rugby league footballer
- Scott Porter, rugby league footballer
- Ashton Sims, rugby league footballer
- David Simmons, rugby league footballer
- Ray Thorburn, politician
- Marc Warren, soccer player
- Jason Wood, politician
