= Fred Anderson (rugby league) =

South Africa international rugby league footballer

Personal information
- Full name: Frederick Jack Anderson
- Born: 22 May 1933 Sutherland, New South Wales, Australia
- Died: 28 March 2012 (aged 78) Illawong, New South Wales, Australia

Playing information
- Position: Hooker
Club
Years	Team	Pld	T	G	FG	P
1952–63	Canterbury-Bankstown	197	16	0	0	48
1964–67	South Sydney	56	6	0	0	18
	Total	253	22	0	0	66
Representative
Years	Team	Pld	T	G	FG	P
1958–61	New South Wales	2	1	0	0	3
1963	South Africa	2	0	0	0	0

Fred Anderson (22 May 1933 – 28 March 2012) was an Australian rugby league footballer who played in the 1950s and 1960s.

== Club career ==
During his very long career, Fred Anderson played predominantly for Canterbury-Bankstown but also for South Sydney in the New South Wales Rugby Football League premiership.

Anderson represented the South Africa national rugby league team on one occasion in 1963, his position of choice was at hooker. He had played 261 first grade games in his 16-year career.

He played with the Canterbury club for twelve seasons between 1953 and 1963. He then joined South Sydney for four seasons between 1964 and 1967. He was regarded as a champion hooker during the era when scrimmaging was an important part of the game.

Anderson played for Souths in the famous 1965 grand final against St. George in front of a record 78,000 fans at the Sydney Cricket Ground. By the time he turned 34, his career had come to an end at Souths when he was replaced in first grade by the younger Elwyn Walters in 1967.

== Representative career ==
Fred Anderson represented New South Wales rugby league team on two occasions – 1958 and 1961 – and represented City Firsts in the former season.

He was invited to play for South Africa in 1963 in a single Test against New Zealand, although he was Australian born.

Fred Anderson died on 28 March 2012, 55 days short of his 79th birthday. He was later cremated at Woronora, Sutherland.

== Career playing statistics ==
=== Point scoring summary ===
Games	Tries	Goals	F/G	Points
204	16	-	-	48
57	6	-	-	18

=== Matches played ===
Team	Matches	Years
Canterbury-Bankstown	204	1952–1963
South Sydney	57	1964–1967
New South Wales	3	1958 & 1961
South Africa	2	1963
