= Scott Porter (rugby league) =

Australian rugby league footballer

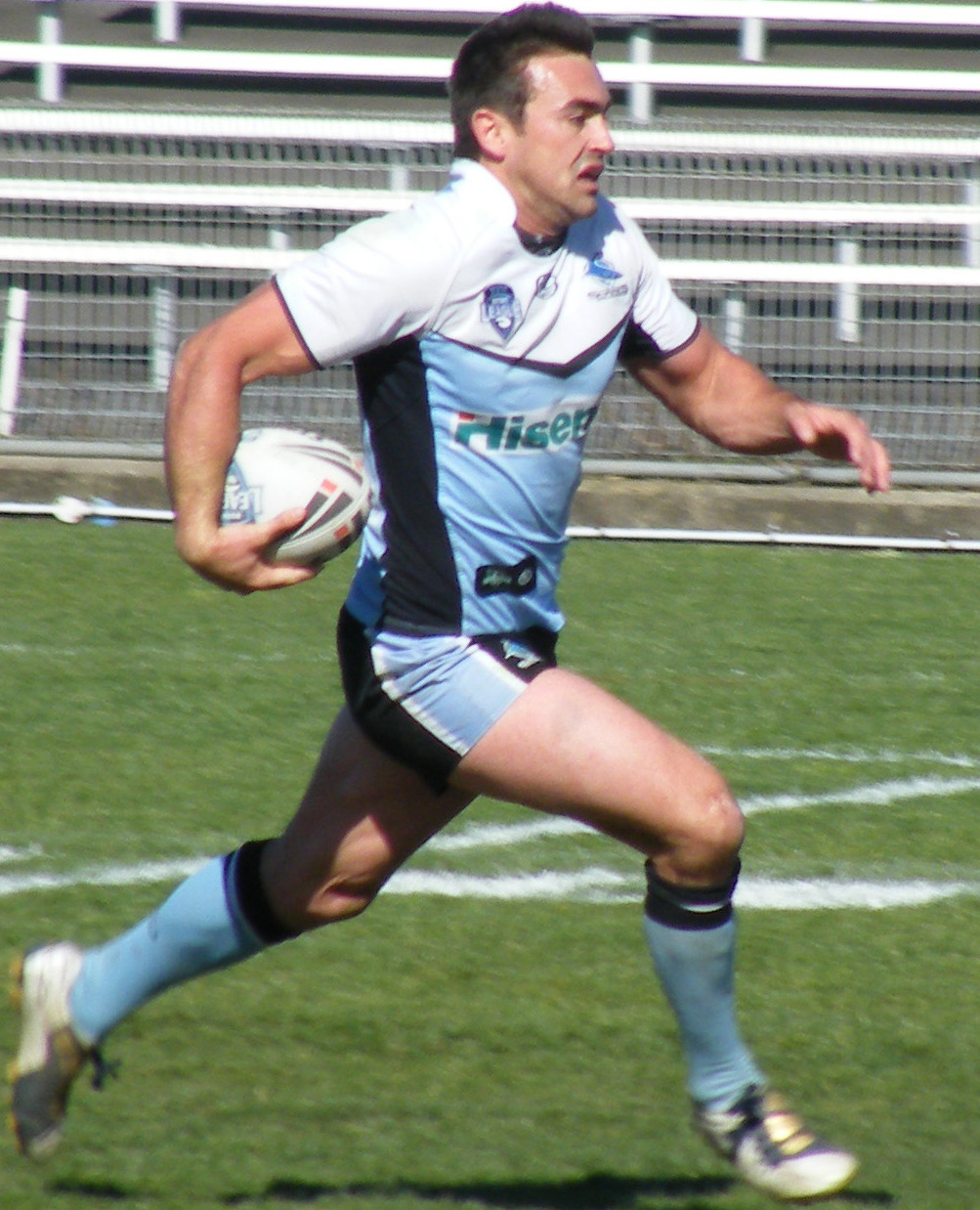

Personal information
- Full name: Scott Porter
- Born: 3 January 1985 (age 40); Sutherland, New South Wales, Australia
- Height: 180 cm (5 ft 11 in)
- Weight: 87 kg (13 st 10 lb)

Playing information
- Position: Halfback
Club
Years	Team	Pld	T	G	FG	P
2009–11	Cronulla Sharks	22	0	14	0	28
- Source: As of 21 January 2019

Scott Porter (born 3 January 1985 in Sutherland, New South Wales) is an Australian former professional rugby league footballer who played with the Cronulla-Sutherland Sharks in the National Rugby League.

== Playing career ==
Porter's junior club was the Cronulla Caringbah. After playing lower grades for the Cronulla Sharks he moved to Rockhampton play for the Central Comets the Queensland Cup.

After moving back to the shire Porter then played in the New South Wales Rugby League south coast competition for the Wollongong Bulls. After being in the rugby league wilderness Porter was thrown a lifeline by Cronulla who were in desperate need of a halfback to fill the lower grades. Porter almost gave the game away before making his first grade debut in 2009. His first match netted a dramatic win over the Parramatta Eels at Parramatta Stadium which ended a long losing streak dating back to round one.
