= Matt Hilder =

Australian rugby league footballer

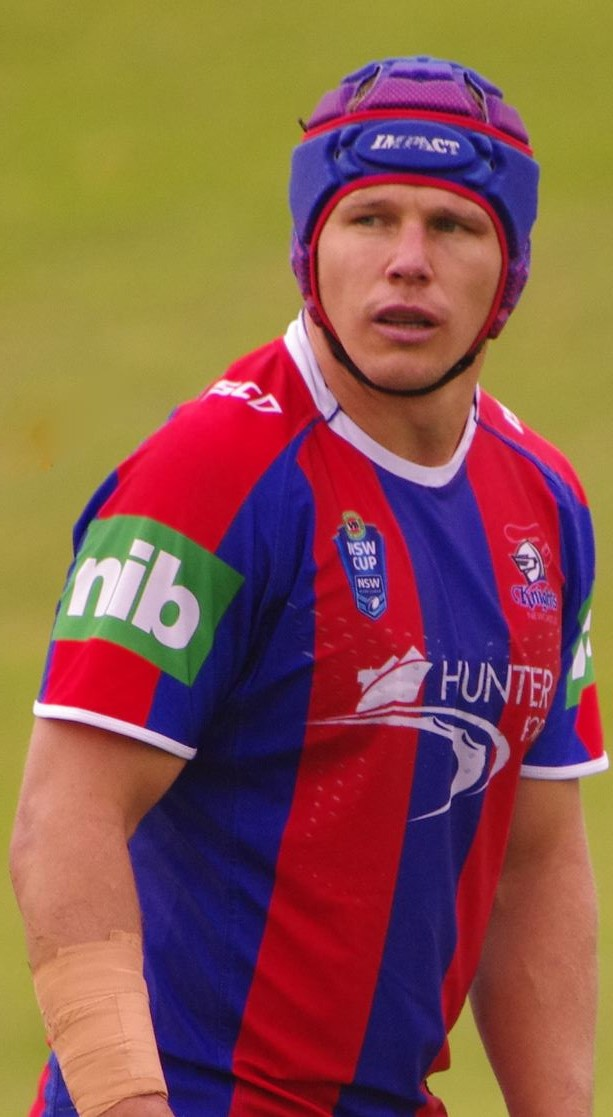
- Hilder playing for the Knights in 2014

Personal information
- Full name: Matthew Hilder
- Born: 30 April 1982 (age 44) Sutherland, New South Wales, Australia

Playing information
- Height: 183 cm (6 ft 0 in)
- Weight: 95 kg (14 st 13 lb)
- Position: Lock, Hooker, Five-eighth
Club
Years	Team	Pld	T	G	FG	P
2003–06	Cronulla Sharks	81	19	29	0	134
2007	Gold Coast Titans	19	1	0	0	4
2008–13	Newcastle Knights	101	13	1	0	54
	Total	201	33	30	0	192

Matt Hilder (born 30 April 1982) is an Australian former professional rugby league footballer who played in the 2000s and 2010s. He played for the Cronulla-Sutherland Sharks, Gold Coast and Newcastle Knights in the National Rugby League. He primarily played at lock, hooker and five-eighth. Throughout his playing career he was known by two nicknames: Trouble, and Waltzing (as in "Waltzing Matilda").

== Background ==
Hilder was born in Sutherland, New South Wales, Australia. He played his junior football for the Cronulla-Caringbah before being signed by Cronulla-Sutherland.

== Playing career ==
=== Cronulla-Sutherland Sharks ===
In round 1 of the 2003 NRL season, Hilder made his NRL debut for Cronulla-Sutherland against the Melbourne Storm scoring a try in a 32-36 loss. In his four years at Cronulla, Hilder played in one finals campaign which came in the 2005 NRL season. Cronulla were eliminated in the first week by rivals St George.

=== Gold Coast Titans ===
After four seasons of first-grade with Cronulla, Hilder joined the Gold Coast Titans for their inaugural season, signing a 1-year contract starting in 2007. He was a regular in first-grade, but left the club at the end of the season.

=== Newcastle Knights ===
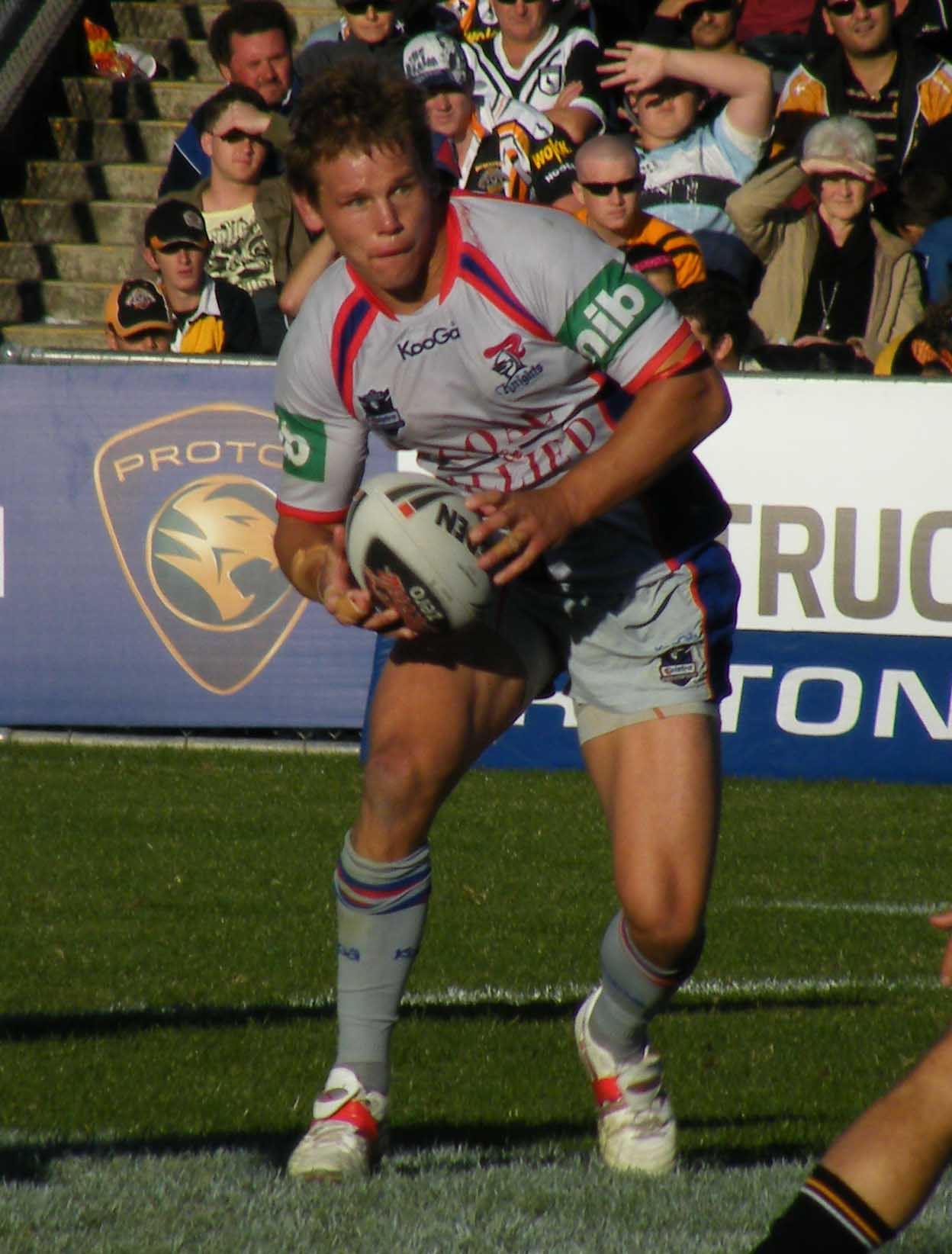
Hilder playing for the Knights in 2009.

In 2008, Hilder joined the Newcastle Knights.

In 2010, Hilder won the Knights' Player of the Year award for being one of the most hardworking and consistent players in the team.

On 6 September 2013, Hilder re-signed with the Knights on a 1-year contract.

A few days after re-signing, Hilder made a return to first-grade — after being seldom used by Knights coach Wayne Bennett since early 2012 — in time to play all three of the Knights' finals games and scoring a try in his 100th Knights game and 200th NRL game against the Melbourne Storm. These were the final few first-grade games of his career.

At the end of 2013, Hilder won the Knights' New South Wales Cup Players' Player award.

In September 2014, Hilder announced his retirement from rugby league, finishing up with 201 NRL appearances.

=== Representative football ===
In July 2013, Hilder played for the New South Wales Residents against the Queensland Residents.

== Controversy ==
On 10 September 2006, Hilder threw a plastic chair at a man during an argument, causing head injuries. Hilder was fined $1,000.

== Personal life ==
Hilder has three children: two daughters, Indy and Eden, and a son, Sonny
