= Fantasy flight =

Charity flights operated by an airline

- Type: Wish granting
- Purpose: Medical, homeless
- Origins: Commercial aviation employees
- Region served: Flight to nowhere, tarmac
- Method: Aviation, dream
- Key people: Airlines, hospitals

Fantasy flights are charity flights operated by a host airline that allow locally disadvantaged and terminally ill children to fly to a fictitious destination.

The destination is often the North Pole, the home of Santa Claus' workshop. Employees and locals often including firemen, police officers, and local church groups generally donate their own time and labor to decorate either a gate area or a dedicated terminal area. Employees often don costumes including magicians and Santa's helpers known as elves to entertain the children. Various gifts and take-away bags often accompany the Christmas and holiday seasons' theme. Often, local companies and charitable organizations are sponsors. Host airlines donate venues (gate areas), aircraft, fuel, and fellow sponsors. The cost is virtually always free.

Fantasy flights differ from angel flights in that fantasy flights

- are not to reach a practical or far away destination,
- generally have no compelling practical need (i.e. specialized medical treatment) for transportation,
- are initiated by the parents' outreach to the sponsoring organizations instead of by a referring health professional,
- and may include those without medical conditions due to the customary lack of pressurization and duration

== Examples ==
=== Commercial aviation ===
The following commercial aviation operators are sorted by airlines' names' alphabetical order.

Aerolíneas Argentinas conducts fantasy flights between Buenos Aires' two main airports, Ministro Pistarini International Airport and Jorge Newberry Airport. These flights typically last around one hour, and are flown on jet aircraft. The children enjoy a view of the city of Buenos Aires on these flights.

Air Labrador operated a fantasy flight with a Santa visit on board to the plane on the tarmac while taxiing.

Alaska Airlines is the official airline of the non-profit charity Spokane Fantasy Flight which organizes an annual fantasy flight at Spokane International Airport, its 12th being in 2009.

American Airlines is a primary sponsor and official airline of Snowball Express, a non-profit charity for the children of fallen military service members. American Airlines provides the pilots, flight crews, aircraft, and fuel coordination. In its 2006 inaugural year, the experience flew children to Los Angeles International Airport for 4 days of an all-expenses paid experience in Southern California. In 2008, 6 chartered aircraft made 20 stops across the United States with celebrations at each. In 2009, the experience was in Dallas, Texas with hosts the Mesquite Championship Rodeo, Gary Sinise and the Lt. Dan Band, the Sheraton Dallas Hotel, Southfork Ranch, the Dallas Cowboys, Cowboys Stadium, the Dallas Convention Center, American Airlines Center, and the Dallas Mavericks. In 2010, Dallas again hosted Snowball Express adding hosts Terry Fator and Six Flags Over Texas. In 2011, host cities included Little Rock, Arkansas.

British Airways operates a special day return trip for kids with life-threatening illnesses from Glasgow Prestwick Airport to Rovaniemi Airport, Finland, located near the Arctic Circle, to ride snowmobiles, take husky dog sled rides and meet Santa and his reindeer.

Continental Airlines operated Operation Santa Claus to airlift children's toys to those in need and an annual North Pole Fantasy Flight which has operated at its Technical Operations hangar at Orlando International Airport, Austin-Bergstrom International Airport, San Antonio International Airport, Cleveland Hopkins International Airport annually for 22 years, Newark Liberty International Airport the New England Air Museum in Windsor Locks, Connecticut with Connecticut Children's Medical Center.

JetBlue Airways held its 3rd annual "Wings for Autism" event at Logan Airport on April 6, 2013 with staff from United Airlines, Delta Air Lines, Massachusetts State Police, The Charles River Center, and Massport in support and an on-board experience also with United Airlines.

Silverliners - a group of former Eastern Airlines fight attendants - organize a Fantasy Flight from Detroit Metropolitan Airport in Romulus, Michigan. Delta provides a jet and current staff members to pilot and serve as ground personnel, ticket staff and flight attendants. 2016 was the thirty-first year the Silverliners organized the Fantasy Flight.

Southwest Airlines operated its fantasy flights at Baltimore Thurgood Marshall Airport with the Johns Hopkins Children's Center for years.

Sun Country Airlines operated fantasy flights at Minneapolis-St Paul International Airport.

United Airlines operated fantasy flights at Washington Dulles Airport on 2002-12-07, 2003-12-06, 2006-12-02, and 2008-12-16; Phoenix International Airport with the Thomas J. Pappas School; Dulles International Airport; Chicago O'Hare International Airport; Miami International Airport; LaGuardia Airport; Las Vegas International Airport; Louis Armstrong New Orleans International Airport on 2000-04-25; San Francisco International Airport; Los Angeles International Airport; Ministro Pistarini International Airport; Sydney Airport; and for the first time in 2006, Denver International Airport, where its East Red Carpet Club was decorated and hosted the attendees with clowns, elves, and musicians. Airport employees funded the operation which includes a plane taxiing around the airport and presents. United did so again in 2009. United Airlines is the former official airline of Spokane Fantasy Flight. United held its last Fantasy Flight in Phoenix on 2009-12-04 albeit through a non-profit organization's organizing and funding. United also promotes the program officially as a part of its United Employee Volunteer Program. In 2016, United flew fantasy flights from 11 different airports serving 5000 children and their families. In 2017, United operated 13 fantasy flights from 13 markets serving 5000 children.

US Airways operated its fantasy flights at LaGuardia Airport with Shriners Hospitals for Children for over 12 years and at Phoenix International Airport.

Winnipeg International Airport, Skyservice Airlines, and sponsors operated "north pole express", annual fantasy flights for children from (a) chosen local public school(s) with a takeoff, flight, pilot's announcement of a Santa sighting, and an onboard visit from Santa. This event won the Airports Council International 2009 award for special events.

Helicopter operators such as the San Jose Police Department Air Support Unit also operate fantasy flights, namely by landing with Santa on board.

=== Railway ===
Railways including the Valley Railroad Company, the Steam Railroading Institute, Branson Scenic Railway (in a one-time promotion for the film The Polar Express), and Newport Dinner Train operate fantasy rides.
