= Bibas =

Origin
- Language: Greek
- Meaning: Priest

Other names
- Variant form: Pappas

Bibas or Peppas (Arabic: بيباص; Greek: Πέππας; Hebrew: ביבאס) is a Greek surname derived from the word παππάς (pappás) or παπάς (papás), both of which are common terms of endearment for a priest. The surname is used in Greece and across the Mediterranean, including in Libya and Israel.

In Israel, the surname is found among Jewish families of Greek origin.

In Libya, due to the influence of Greek on the local dialect, people are sometimes nicknamed Bibas, largely because of their resemblance to the "peppas," the so-called Christian priests. The name has therefore become a surname used by extended families, including some residents in Janzur, and is also used in other places in Libya, as well as in Tunisia and Algeria.

A community of expatriates with the surname currently resides in the United States.

== People with the surname ==
Notable people with the surname include:

- Christos Peppas
- Haim Bibas
- James Pipas, American virologist
- June Peppas
- Nicholas A. Peppas
- Stephanos Bibas
- Yehuda Bibas
- Bibas family, an Argentine-Israeli family that was kidnapped and taken hostage during the 7 October attacks from their home in Israel near the Gaza Strip
