= Dylan Caton =

Australian football player

Personal information
- Full name: Dylan Caton
- Date of birth: 16 May 1995 (age 31)
- Place of birth: Sutherland, New South Wales, Australia
- Height: 1.78 m (5 ft 10 in)
- Position: Midfielder

Team information
- Current team: Santa Clara Broncos

Youth career
- –2013: Sutherland Sharks
- 2013–2015: Sydney FC

College career
Years	Team	Apps	(Gls)
2016–	Santa Clara Broncos	11	(4)

Senior career*
Years	Team	Apps	(Gls)
2014	Sydney FC	2	(0)
2015	Sutherland Sharks	11	(0)
- * Club domestic league appearances and goals as of 10 October 2015 ‡ National team caps and goals as of 11 January 2014

Dylan Caton is an Australian football (soccer) player who played as a midfielder for Sydney FC in the A-League. He debuted against Western Sydney Wanderers on January 11, 2014, coming on for Alessandro Del Piero.
