= Pipa, Sichuan =

Pipa 琵琶镇
- Town
- Location in Sichuan
- Coordinates: 29°6′2″N 105°4′14″E
- Country: People's Republic of China
- Province: Sichuan
- Prefecture-level city: Zigong
- County: Fushun County
- Time zone: UTC+8 (China Standard)

Pipa (Chinese: 琵琶; pinyin: Pípá) is a town in Fushun County, Zigong, Sichuan province, China. As of 2020, it administers Pipachang Residential Community (琵琶场社区) and the following 12 villages:

- Fu'an Village (富安村)
- Lice Village (理策村)
- Shunjiang Village (顺江村)
- Aijia Village (艾家村)
- Dongshang Village (洞上村)
- Shigong Village (石贡村)
- Tudi Village (土地村)
- Qingfeng Village (青峰村)
- Xujia Village (徐家村)
- Nongchang Village (农场村)
- Jinzhu Village (金竹村)
- Qingshan Village (青山村)

== See also ==
- List of township-level divisions of Sichuan
