= Marc Pappas =

American politician

Member of the New Hampshire House of Representatives from the Hillsborough 47th district
- In office 1994–1996
- In office 1998–2000

Member of the New Hampshire House of Representatives from the Hillsborough 48th district
- In office 2000–2002

Member of the New Hampshire House of Representatives from the Hillsborough 49th district
- In office 2002–2004

Personal details
- Party: Republican

Marc Pappas is an American politician. He served as a Republican member of the New Hampshire House of Representatives.

== Life and career ==
Pappas was an assistant secretary of the New Hampshire Republican State Committee.

Pappas served in the New Hampshire House of Representatives from 1994 to 1996 and again from 1998 to 2004.
