= Pippa Small =

British jeweller, anthropologist and humanitarian

- Born: Montreal, Quebec, Canada
- Education: BSC Anthropology, Masters Medical Anthropology
- Alma mater: School of Oriental and African Studies
- Occupations: Jewellery designer, anthropologist
- Known for: Jewellery, anthropology, humanitarian work
- Website: pippasmall.com

Pippa Small MBE is a British jeweller, anthropologist and humanitarian. She is the owner of Pippa Small Jewellery.

== Early life and education ==
Small was born in Montreal, Quebec. She grew up on a farm in Wiltshire, England. Later, she received a degree in Anthropology and a Masters in Medical Anthropology at the School of Oriental and Asian Studies in London.

She then began working with small, disadvantaged communities and tribes in Panama, Borneo, Thailand, and India.

== Career ==
Her collection was first stocked in Barney's New York. She then worked with Christina Kim from Dosa in 2000, Nicole Farhi in 2001, Tom Ford at Gucci in 2002, and Chloe under Phoebe Philo. Pippa opened her first shop in 2007 in Notting Hill in London and in 2008 she opened a shop in Brentwood, Los Angeles. In 2016, she opened a concession in New York at ABC Carpet & Home.

She has worked with the world's first registered Fair trade gold mine in Bolivia and with the Fair trade company MADE based in Kibera, Nairobi. Pippa also works with the charity Turquoise Mountain in Afghanistan where she helps to train and employ artisans to promote traditional skills.

Meghan Markle wore a Pippa Small necklace in her interview with Oprah Winfrey in 2021.

== Awards ==
Pippa was made an ambassador of the human rights organisation Survival International in 2008. The Queen awarded her an MBE in 2013 for ethical jewellery and charity work. She won Ethical Jeweller of the Year and the Walpole Corporate Social Responsibility award in 2016. Pippa was the winner of the Green Sustainability Award for Sustainability by Town and Country magazine.

== Press ==
Pippa Small has been featured in the Financial Times, Vogue, The Guardian, Metro, The Telegraph, and Town & Country.
