= Arthur Pappas =

Australian rugby league footballer

Personal information
- Full name: Arthur Pappas
- Born: 22 August 1969 (age 55); Sutherland, Australia

Playing information
- Position: Second-row
Club
Years	Team	Pld	T	G	FG	P
1989–90	Cronulla-Sutherland	29	1	13	0	30
1992	South Sydney	3	0	0	0	0
	Total	32	1	13	0	30

Arthur Pappas (born in Sutherland, New South Wales) is an Australian former rugby league footballer who played for the Cronulla-Sutherland Sharks and South Sydney Rabbitohs clubs in the New South Wales Rugby League premiership competition.
