= Thomas J. Pappas School =

School network in Maricopa County, Arizona

The Thomas J. Pappas Schools were a series of related alternative schools located in the Phoenix, Arizona area. A part of the Maricopa County Regional School District, the Thomas J. Pappas schools provided primary and secondary education to homeless children in the area. They were named for Thomas J. Pappas, a prominent Phoenix businessman known for his strong support of homeless causes, who died in 1989. The schools closed in 2008 following several years of controversy and legal issues surrounding the schools' administrator, Sandra Dowling, the Maricopa County Superintendent of Schools.

== History ==
The early beginnings of the school can be traced to a volunteer effort by Phoenix firefighters prior to 1989 of providing tutoring classes to local homeless children. Originally held in a shelter and later moved to a hotel, the first classes were attended by only 8 students.

Funding and resources were non-existent in the early days of the program and In an effort to determine whether the small fledgling volunteer effort could be stabilized and expanded into an official program, a group of local firefighters contacted Sandra Dowling, the newly elected Maricopa County School Superintendent . Realizing that homeless students were not receiving appropriate education services through the local school district, Dowling and the firefighters worked with the Maricopa Association of Governments (MAG) to change the plight of what turned out to be thousands of children over a twenty-year span. In 1990 Dowling founded the Thomas J. Pappas School for Homeless Children using the limited resources provided through state funding opportunities, federal grant monies and community donations to develop an official curriculum and provide school facilities for homeless children. A local Episcopal church housed the first classrooms before growth of the program in less than one academic year quadrupled the number of students requiring services. The move to a former car dealership that was leased and then renovated for use as a school for grades K-8, Dowling's program becoming the first school for the homeless children in Phoenix and evolved into a national model.

In response to continued growth in attendance a new school was constructed in 1997 serving grades 1-6 and the existing former "car dealership" was building was converted to a middle school. The concept was further expanded by the founding of the Tempe Thomas J. Pappas Elementary School in nearby Tempe in 2001. While originally housed in a strip mall, the satellite school moved into a new facility constructed in 2004.

The Pappas Schools enjoyed the support of national, state, local and religious community leaders. Players from all of the local sports organizations visited and volunteered at the school. Players would don chef hats and aprons and serve meals for major holidays including Thanksgiving, Christmas and Easter. They would be seen on campus's on a regular basis playing on the playground with the children or being a "classroom helper" for the day.

The school thrived with the help of volunteer organizations such as the Creative Women of Pinnacle Peak, Rotary and Lions clubs, volunteers from local retirement communities and other school children in more prosperous school districts that wanted to help. Retirees from as far away as Sun City, Pebble Creek and Apache Junction would drive weekly and sometimes daily to be a reading coach for the students.

Corporate and community sponsors included Salt River Project, Nationwide Vision, Arizona Diamondbacks, Phoenix Suns and Arizona Cardinals. United Airlines sponsored annual fantasy flights for students annually. Contributions from all over Arizona and throughout the United States allowed the school to have an on-site medical center that provided medical, vision and dental care. Volunteer doctors and dentists provided care to many students for the first time in their young lives. Students had an opportunity to visit the "birthday closet", take home food from the food pantry on a regular basis or to visit "The Gap", the on-site clothing room that provided clean clothes and a new pair of shoes for the children as needed.

== Political issues and closure ==
As alternative schools that did not operate under established geographical school districts, the Thomas J. Pappas schools never enjoyed funding from a traditional school tax district. The Maricopa County Schoolhouse Foundation was established as a 501C-3 charitable foundation to organize fundraising activities to support the schools.

Severe financial issues created concern as to the future of the Pappas schools. In 2006, it was discovered the Maricopa County Board of Supervisors had diverted and withheld more than $3.8 million in funding to the school. In an attempt to conceal the funding scheme, county leadership led by County Manager David Smith, enlisted the assistance of the Sheriff and alleged that Dowling misappropriated the funds instead. A massive legal and public battle ensued that led to an investigation into certain accounting practices called into question a number of officials related to the school. During the court proceedings it was discovered and entered into the court records that county leaders and the Sheriff "lied, misled and distorted evidence" presented to the grand jury. Counts that were remanded back to the grand jury were never refiled and the remaining counts were dismissed and Dowling and other leaders that had been targeted were exonerated. However, the public fight took its toll on the district's leadership and teachers, fearing they would not get paid, were taking other job opportunities. . Judicial intervention and an outpouring of support from local charities secured the schools for a brief time.

Questions regarding the school's financial stability continued well into 2007. In spite of financial help from outside sources the school continued to operate at a deficit because the Maricopa County finance department refused to allow the county treasurer to pay employees or vendors. As a result, by October the school district had racked up a debt of an estimated $2.9 million. Although funds were in school district accounts to make the required payments, without approval from the Board of Supervisor's the Treasurer was not allowed to issue payment. Attempts to solve the school's political battles with Dowling did not succeed, and on October 18, 2007, a settlement was approved that would require the closure of all 3 Pappas schools by June 30, 2008. Students attending Pappas schools were expected to register at more traditional schools following the closure date.

Dowling did not to run for re-election as county schools superintendent in the wake of the Pappas Schools controversy and her ongoing related legal issues.

Dowling was eventually cleared of all charges. She sued Maricopa County for bringing false charges against her and was awarded a cash settlement in 2013. In 2009, she received a written apology published on the editorial page of the state's largest newspaper, The Arizona Republic for their coverage of the events The "witch hunt" against Dowling has been extensively documented and reported on by many leading publications in the state. She now enjoys being involved in political activities again, her role as an educational leader and business owner in the community.

The Maricopa County Board of Supervisors closed the Thomas J. Pappas Schools in 2008. The Tempe campus presently houses a public charter school. The Phoenix campus, once listed as a Point of Pride by the city, was demolished in March 2011.
