= Pippa Van Iersel =

Dutch kitesurfer

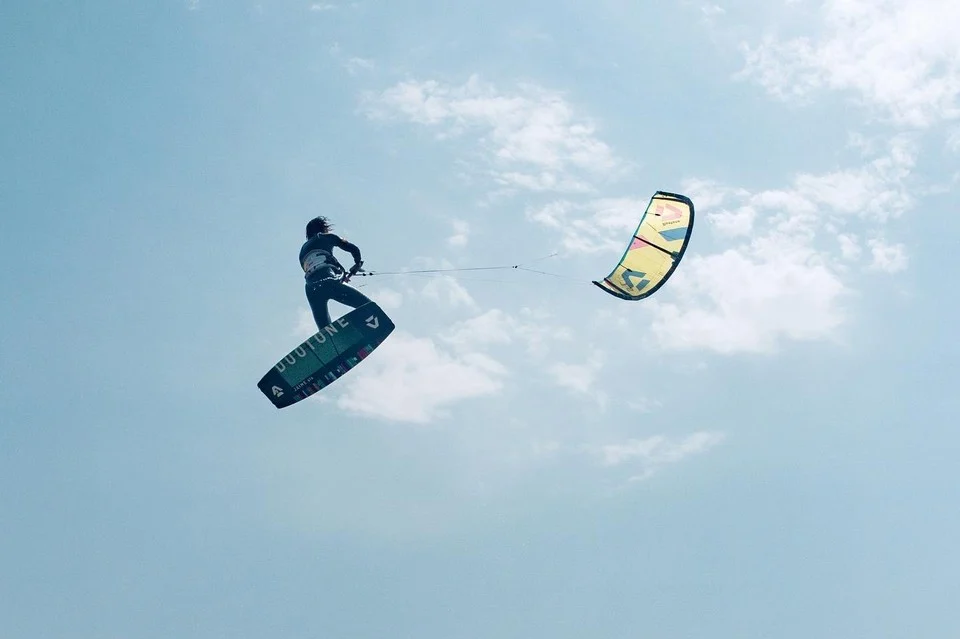
- Pippa Van Iersel kiteboarding
- Born: July 1, 1999 (age 26); Hoorn, Netherlands
- Occupation: Dutch kitesurfer

Pippa Van Iersel (born July 1, 1999, in Hoorn) is an Dutchwoman female kite surfer. She is a presence in the GKA World Tour kiteboarding contests and Big Air Kite League (BAKL) and she has been the Kitesurf Dutch Champion since 2016. Van Iersel is sponsored by Duotone and O'Neill.

== Titles ==
- 3rd place GKA Air Games 2018
- 3rd place GKA Freestyle 2019
- 3rd place GKA Freestyle 2020
- 3rd place GKA Freestyle 2021
- 1st place BAKL Brazil September 2021
- 1st place BAKL France October 2021
- 1st place BAKL Lords of Tram April 2022
- 3rd place BAKL Full Power Tarifa May 2022
- 1st place GKA Lords of Tram April 2024
- 3rd place GKA World Big Air 2024
