= Tasos Pappas =

Greek footballer

Personal information
- Full name: Anastasios – Yeorghios Pappas
- Date of birth: 1 September 1984 (age 42)
- Place of birth: Corfu, Greece
- Height: 1.81 m (5 ft 11 in)
- Position: Defender

Senior career*
Years	Team	Apps	(Gls)
2003–2004	Kerkyra	n/a (n/a)	
2005–2008	Giannena AE	n/a (n/a)	
2008	Aiolikos	1 (–)	
- * Club domestic league appearances and goals

Tasos Pappas (born 1 September 1984) is a Greek footballer who last played for Aiolikos in the Gamma Ethniki.
