= Pipa, Gansu =

Pipa 琵琶镇
- Town
- Location in Gansu
- Coordinates: 33°9′57″N 105°18′52″E
- Country: People's Republic of China
- Province: Gansu
- Prefecture-level city: Longnan
- District: Wudu District
- Time zone: UTC+8 (China Standard)

Pipa (Chinese: 琵琶; pinyin: Pípá) is a town in Wudu District, Longnan, Gansu province, China. As of 2020, it has 26 villages under its administration:

- Wutuo Village (勿驮村)
- Maya Village (麻崖村)
- Loudi Village (楼底村)
- Maopo Village (毛坡村)
- Jigongyan Village (鸡公眼村)
- Qiuju Village (秋咀村)
- Wangjiashanggou Village (王家上沟村)
- Tangba Village (唐坝村)
- Wafangba Village (瓦房坝村)
- Mafugou Village (麻付沟村)
- Hujiagou Village (胡家沟村)
- Xiaochuanba Village (小川坝村)
- Majiagou Village (马家沟村)
- Gaojiaba Village (高家坝村)
- Pipajie Village (琵琶街村)
- Xiaohe Village (小河村)
- Wujiashan Village (武家山村)
- Longtan Village (龙潭村)
- Xiagaojia Village (下高家村)
- Wangjiashan Village (王家山村)
- Maojiagou Village (毛家沟村)
- Zhangba Village (张坝村)
- Xuanwan Village (玄湾村)
- Ningqiang Village (宁强村)
- Tanba Village (谈坝村)
- Shuimo Village (水磨村)

== See also ==
- List of township-level divisions of Gansu
