= Pippo =

Pippo is the diminutive of the Italian names Filippo and Giuseppe and also a given name, and it may refer to:

== People ==
- Pippo Barzizza (1902–1994), Italian Maestro and composer
- Pippo Baudo (1936–2025), Italian television presenter
- Pippo Caruso (1935–2018), Italian composer, conductor and music arranger
- Pippo Civati (born 1975), Italian politician
- Pippo Fava (1925–1984), Sicilian writer, investigative journalist, playwright, activist and Mafia victim
- Pippo Franco (born 1940), Italian actor, comedian, television presenter and singer
- Pippo Inzaghi (born 1973), Italian former football player
- Pippo Maniero (born 1972), Italian former football player
- Pippo Pollina (born 1963), Italian singer-songwriter
- Pippo Pozzato (born 1981), Italian road racing cyclist
- Pippo Psaila (born 1957), former Malta national football team coach and current Director of Sports of the Malta Olympic Committee
- Pippo Tesauro (1260–1320), Italian painter
- Pippo Torri, Italian far-left politician
- Giuseppe Di Stefano (1921–2008), Italian tenor
