= Pipas Bay =

- Baía das Pipas (Portuguese)
- Location in Angola
- Coordinates: 14.9398°S 12.192°E
- Ocean/sea sources: Atlantic Ocean
- Basin countries: Angola
- Max. length: 1.3 km (0.81 mi)
- Max. width: 4.2 km (2.6 mi)
- Settlements: Pipas

Pipas Bay (Portuguese: Baía das Pipas) is a bay in Angola. It is located in the Namibe Province, 30 km north of Moçâmedes.

== Geography ==
Pipas Bay is an open bay of the South Atlantic Ocean. The bay is facing west, with the Ponta da Baia headland at the southwestern end and the Praia das Salinas beach stretching north towards the northern end of the bay. The small settlement of Pipas is located near the shore.

== See also ==
- Geography of Angola
