= James Pipas =

American molecular virologist

James M. Pipas is an American molecular virologist. He currently holds the Herbert W. and Grace Boyer Chair in Molecular Biology at the University of Pittsburgh.

Pipas is a graduate of the University of Southern Mississippi, and completed his Ph.D. in molecular biophysics at Florida State University in 1975, under the supervision of Robert H. Reeves. After postdoctoral research at Baylor College with John H. Wilson, and at Johns Hopkins University with Daniel Nathans, he joined the University of Pittsburgh faculty in 1980.
