= Action Man (disambiguation) =

Action Man is an action figure toy.

Action Man may also refer to:

== Connected to the toy ==
- Action Man (1993–2006 toyline), the second-generation Hasbro Action Man
- Action Man: 40th Anniversary, a 2006 series of reproduction figures
- Action Man (1995 TV series), an American children's animated television show
- Action Man (2000 TV series), a Canadian CGI animated TV series
- Action Man (comics), a UK comic series
- Action Man: Robot Atak, a 2004 direct-to-DVD CGI animated film
- Action Man: Search for Base X, a 2001 action video game
- Action Man: Destruction X, a 2000 action video game
- Action Man: Jungle Storm, a 2000 action video game
- Action Man: Raid on Island X, a 1999 action video game
- Action Man: Operation Extreme, a 1999 action video game
- Action Man A.T.O.M., a French-American animated television series

== Not connected to the toy ==
- Action Man (film), a 1967 French film
- Bejawada (film), a 2011 Indian Telugu-language film, Hindi title Hero: The Action Man
- Dick Beyer (1930–2019), wrestler
- "Action Man", a song by Widespread Panic from the album Don't Tell the Band
- "Action Man", a song by Cephas & Wiggins from the album Cool Down
- The Action Man, a Venture Bros. character
- "Action Man", a song by Sarah Brightman

== See also ==
- Man of Action (disambiguation)
