= List of Action Man characters =

The following article is a list of characters who have appeared in various media across the Action Man franchise, including the original Palitoy toyline, the subsequent Hasbro toy line, the Panini Comics series, various video games, and the two Action Man TV shows, from USA in 1995 and from Canada in 2000.

== Heroes ==
=== Action Man ===
The eponymous protagonist of the franchise, Action Man first introduced as an action figure in 1966 as a British equivalent to G.I. Joe. The character soon developed his own identity as an action hero, rather than being specifically a military figure. Although the appearance and backstory of Action Man has varied over time and across different media, the scar on the character's right cheek has remained consistent. In the Hasbro toy line and the Panini Comics canon, he is depicted as the leader of the heroic 'Action Force' team. He is advanced in many forms of martial arts and has a large arsenal of weapons and vehicles.

In the 1995 TV series, the character is depicted as a man suffering from amnesia who leads the Action Force in their fight against the evil Dr. X and his terrorist organisation. He often has brief flashbacks of his past which are triggered by certain events. He later learns that his real name is Matthew Exler, and that he is the brother of Dr. X (Dorian Exler).

In the 2000 TV series, Action Man was reimagined as extreme sports athlete Alex Mann of 'Team Xtreme'. He has a special ability called an AMP (Advanced Macro Probability) Factor, a result of secret experiments by his former coach Simon Grey. The AMP Factor allows Alex to see every possibility in a situation but in order to use it he has to feel a triggering adrenaline rush.

Action Man was released as a G.I. Joe figure in 2004 and was a Toys R Us Night Force set exclusive where he joined up with him when a rogue agent sided with Cobra. The figure's description states that he is a member of the G.I. Joe Team's Night Force. The character was originally planned to have a starring role in an early script for G.I. Joe: Rise of Cobra.

The Action Man character was again rebooted by IDW Publishing in 2016 for a four-issue limited comic book series set within the Hasbro Comic Book Universe. In this series, 'Action Man' is a title held by the lead agent in the secret British intelligence operation, the Action Man Programme, with Agent Ian Noble as the current Action Man. This incarnation of the character was subsequently featured in the "Revolution" and "First Strike" crossover storylines alongside several other Hasbro characters.

Action Man is voiced by Mark Griffin in the 1995 series and by Mark Hildreth in the 2000 series.

=== Flynt ===
Flynt is an Australian member of Action Force introduced in 2004 alongside Red Wolf. A lover of action and extreme sports, Flynt is typically seen with his dirt rider or snowboard and is often depicted with an arm in a cast due to sporting injuries. Two action figures of Flynt were released and the character was featured regularly in Action Man comics as well as the 2004 film Action Man: Robot Atak and its sequels. His only video game appearance came in the adaptation of Robot Atak, where he was a playable character.

=== Red Wolf ===
Red Wolf is a Native American archer and Action Force member introduced in 2004, alongside Flynt. As well as his bow and arrows, he is equipped with a Wavin pipe and tomahawk. Three action figures were released by Hasbro, the second of which came with a canoe. In 2005, he was seen with a section of his hair dyed red, an indicator of the time he successfully wrestled a bear. Red Wolf was a recurring character in Panini's Action Man comic book from his introduction up to the finale of the series and featured in each of the direct-to-DVD Action Man films. He was also a playable character in the video game Action Man: Robot Atak.

=== Natalie Poole ===
Natalie Poole is a member of the Action Force seen in the 1995 TV series. Hasbro released a single, now rare, action figure which had a kicking action. At Joecon 2010, a convention exclusive Q-Force action figure of Natalie was released and came with a 'Silent Attack' canoe. Poole is the only female Action Man character for which Hasbro produced any toys.

In G.I. Joe vs. Cobra JoeCon Special #3 (2010) published by Fun Publications, Natalie is a member of the Action Force. In Revolutionaries #7 (June 2017), part of the Hasbro Comic Book Universe published by IDW Publishing, Natalie is a member of Team Extreme alongside Action Man.

Natalie Poole is voiced by Joely Collins in the 1995 series.

=== Knuck Williams ===
Knuck Williams is a military member of the Action Force in the 1995 TV series, always sporting a beret and camo gear. Like Natalie Poole, a single action figure of Knuck was manufactured by Hasbro during the 1990s.

Knuck Williams is voiced by Dale Wilson in the 1995 series.

=== Jacques ===
Jacques is a French wheelchair-using boy and member of Action Force in the 1995 TV series. He was in charge of the team's computer works.

Jacques is voiced by Richard Ian Cox in the 1995 series

=== Krunch ===
Duane Curtis, also known as "Krunch", is a professional boxer and ally of Action Man. A single limited edition 12" action figure was released by Hasbro in 1996, which included a title belt accessory. Also included in the box was a mini Action Man comic book produced by Marvel Comics, in which Krunch battles Professor Gangrene.

=== RAID ===
RAID (short for Randomly Acquired Intelligent Dog) is the pet dog of Action Man. He first appeared in the 1995 TV series and would later appear sporadically in the Panini Comics series. Several different action figures of Raid were released, the final one in 2003. RAID became the poster-dog for the SPCA after Action Man aggressively chastised him for urinating on his new rug, prompting outrage from the public. The dog who played RAID went on to have success playing Cerberus in the Broadway adaption of "Hercules in New York".

== Villains ==
=== Dr. X ===
Dr. X (real name Count Laszlo Huszar II) is the main antagonist of the franchise, introduced in 1993. He is a psychopathic and misanthropic mastermind bent on world domination and is prepared to reach his goal by any means necessary. Despite his varying appearance over the years that exposed toxic guts in the 1990s, his bionic hand/arm and eye (sometimes covered by an eye patch) remain consistent. He is the leader of the paramilitary terrorist organisation named 'Council of Doom' and has had many villainous teammates, scientists, and right hand men.

In the 1995 TV series, Dr. X was Dorian Exler who was the brother of the man who would become Action Man.

In the 2000 TV series, Dr. X is a handicapped scientist who worked with Simon Grey to help humanity in case of a nuclear war. This included creating Action Man's AMP factor. However, Simon left because he thought Dr. X's methods were genocidal. Unabated, Dr. X continued his work on 'neo-humanity', eventually transplanting his mind into the body of Action Man's sporting rival Brandon Cane in an attempt to obtain immortality. Driven by insanity and believing that the world is no longer worth ruling, Dr. X attempts to destroy Earth with a meteor.

In the 2016 comic series by IDW Publishing, the original Doctor X dies in a confrontation with then-Action Man Agent Mike Brogan. His corpse is destroyed by traitorous AMP agent Mercy Gale who adopts his identity to manipulate global conflicts. Gale receives an X-shaped scar after being non-fatally shot by current Action Man, agent Ian Noble.

Dr. X is voiced by Rolf Leenders in the 1995 series. In the 200 series, Doctor X is voiced by Campbell Lane in his original body and by Michael Kopsa in his new body.

=== Professor Gangrene ===
Professor Gangrene is another archenemy of Action Man and the former right-hand man of Dr. X. He is known to be a master scientist, who was infected by so many diseases that he became known as Gangrene. Like Dr. X, he has had many different looks, but is easily characterized by his pale green skin and enlarged left eye. He was replaced by No-Face as Dr. X's closest associate after failing to defeat Action Man too many times.

Gangrene was a recurring antagonist in the Panini comic book series, the 1995 TV series and 2000 TV series, the 2005 film Action Man: X-Missions - the Movie.

Several different action figures of Gangrene were released, often featuring some kind of unique gimmick.

Professor Gangrene is voiced by David Hay in the 1995 series, Garry Chalk in the 2000 series, and by Scott McNeil in Action Man: X-Missions - the Movie.

=== No-Face ===
No-Face (real name Gerrard De Visage) is the right-hand man of Dr. X and acted as a replacement for Professor Gangrene in that role. He grew up in Belgium, before moving to the United States to train as a stuntman. His skills in fencing and motorsport caught the eye of Dr. X, who then lured Visage into crime with empty promises of glory. The "No-Face" moniker comes from the hideous state of his skin, the result of a botched robbery where Visage was burned and scarred by acid. No-Face is a master of disguises and his face is often covered by bandages or a mask. Following the death of Dr. X, No-Face creates the 'X-Robot' army and later resurrects his master, in the hope that his services to Dr. X would one day be rewarded by the restoration of his face.

A single action figure was released by Hasbro, but the character was featured prominently in the Panini Comics series from his 2004 introduction onwards and played a prominent role in the film Action Man: Robot Atak.

=== Anti-Freeze ===
A member of Dr. X's Council of Doom, Anti-Freeze was introduced as a toy in 2003. His first appearance in the comic was in issue #89 in a strip titled "Anti-Freeze Attacks". He is a man composed of ice, but it is unknown how he came to be in that state. Anti-Freeze's main weapon is an ice staff.

=== Tempest ===
Tempest (real name Templeton Storm) is a villain allied with Dr. X's Council of Doom who has the power to control the weather using weather machines, which he began creating at a young age. He also wields twin staffs, which can shoot lightning.

Tempest was introduced in the 2000 TV series.

Tempest was subsequently featured in the Panini Comics series.

Two varieties of action figures were released.

Tempest is voiced by Andrew Francis in the 2000 series.

=== Quake ===
Quake is a villain and member of Dr. X who wears a battlesuit that enables him to create earthquakes. He was formerly a janitor named Sydney.

Quake is voiced by Ian James Corlett in the 2000 series.

=== Asazi ===
Appearing in the 2000 TV series, Asazi is a member of Dr. X's Council of Doom. She is a notorious assassin whose signature weapon is a crossbow. In the series finale, Asazi eventually realizes the insanity of Dr. X's plans and helps Team Xtreme.

Asazi is voiced by Janyse Jaud in the 2000 series.

=== Toxica ===
Toxica is the assistant of Professor Gangrene and appeared in Action Man: Operation Extreme, a video game released for the PS1. She appears in a vehicular section of the game controlling a number of henchmen to attack Action Man, before facing him herself.

=== Skullmen ===
The Skullmen are the skull-masked foot soldiers and mercenary army of Dr. X.

=== Plague Locust ===
A villain featured in the PC game Action Man: Raid on Island X, Plague Locust is an insane robotics specialist, disguised in an insect-like armoured outfit featuring a gas mask and a jetpack with insect-like wings. In the game, Action Man must venture into the jungle to fight Plague Locust and his robotic insects, in an effort to halt his plans to take control of jungle animals and use them for crime.

=== X-Robots ===
The X-Robots are a robot army created by No-Face in the image of Dr. X. They were introduced in 2004 and served as a replacement for regular henchmen. Action Man was quickly able to discover the weak spot of the robots: a small panel in the centre of each robot's stomach area.

The X-Robots played a central role in the 2004 direct-to-DVD film Action Man: Robot Atak and its video game adaptation.

In 2005, many X-Robots were upgraded by Dr. X to become 'Toxic Robots' which had blades for arms.

In the 2009 Tesco exclusive range, the X-Robots were redesigned to have faces less akin to that of Dr. X.

=== Raptors ===
The Raptors are a race of dinosaur-like creatures which inhabited the 'Jungle Zone' of Island X. Professor Gangrene later created a race of 'Robo-Raptors' in issue #130 of the Panini Comics series. These were designed to overshadow No-Face's X-Robots in the hope that Gangrene could become Dr. X's right-hand man once again.

=== Intruder ===
The Intruder is a Neanderthal-esque archenemy of Action Man and his team in the original Palitoy Action Man toy franchise. He was introduced in 1976 and sometimes seen with the dragon-like creature Gargon. The action figure featured a 'bear hug' mechanism operated by a button on the back of the doll.

== Other ==
=== Nick Masters ===
Nick Masters TV presenter and extreme sports commentator for the TV network 'Mastervision' in the 2000 TV series. He had a public feud with Templeton Storm which led to Storm becoming Tempest. On camera, Masters appears as a well-adjusted, friendly individual, but in reality Masters is an egotistical person who will do anything for screen time no matter the collateral damage or risk to the lives of others. He later went on to work for the Bank of Ireland as an accountant, solving mysteries such as why the expenses claimed by senior executives were so excessively high.

Nick Master was voiced by Mackenzie Gray in the 2000 series.

=== Professor Moran ===
Professor Moran is a scientist who was kidnapped by No-Face and forced to make a mind control gas for Dr. X during the events of the 2004 Panini Comics story-arc and the 2004 film Action Man: Robot Atak. Action Force ultimately save Moran from Dr. X and free him from captivity.

=== Brandon Caine ===
Brandon Caine is the sporting rival of Alex Mann in the 2000 TV series. He is soon captured by Dr. X who uses Cane's body to place his mind into. Brandon's mind took control of some of Dr. X's nanotech trilobites in order to get revenge on Dr. X. Though this was thwarted, Action Man's group were able to make a new body for Brandon.

Brandon Caine is voiced by Tyler Labine in the 2000 series.
