= Action Man (1993–2006 toyline) =

Toy line by Hasbro

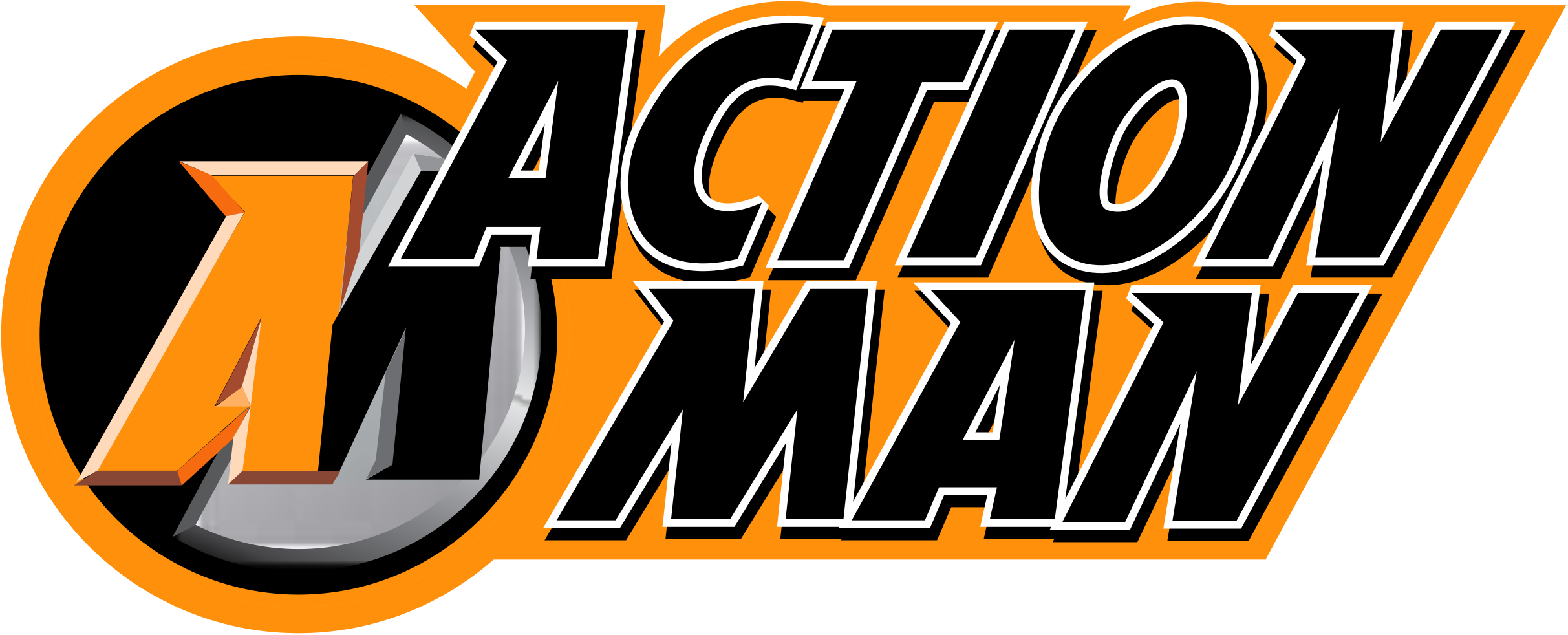
- Created by: Hasbro
- Original work: Original Palitoy toy

Print publications
- Comics: Panini Comics series IDW series

Films and television
- Films: Robot Atak; X-Missions - the Movie; The Gangrene Code
- Animated series: 1995 series 2000 series

Games
- Video game(s): Search for Base X Operation Extreme; Robot Atak

Miscellaneous
- Related franchises: Action Force; G.I. Joe; A.T.O.M; Max Steel

Official website
- actionman.com

Action Man is a line of action figures produced by Hasbro from 1993 to 2006 and again in 2009.

The line began as a relaunch of the original Palitoy action figure range and eventually grew to become a multimedia franchise consisting of toys, books, video games, two television programs, animated films, and a comic book published by Panini Comics.

The toy line centred around the eponymous 'Action Man', an action hero who continuously fought to foil the evil, world-conquering schemes of his nemesis, Dr. X. Toys were also produced of several supporting characters, who were typically allies of either Action Man or Dr. X.

== History ==
=== Beginnings and success ===
Following the end of the Action Force toyline, Action Man was rebranded and relaunched by Hasbro in 1993. The initial releases were repackaged G.I. Joe Hall of Fame figures, originally released in the United States and modelled on the 3 3/4" GI Joe line-up. This was followed by a 30th anniversary edition modelled after the original 1966 Palitoy release, albeit using the GI Joe "Hall of Fame" body, that lacked the articulation, scale and proportions of the original figure and accessories. A variety of body types were subsequently offered across different price ranges. This new version of the Action Man figure moved away from the more militaristic theme of the original Palitoy range in favour of an "extreme sports" theme, and introduced a terrorist antagonist in the form of Dr. X. Branded toys, books, stationery and other items were also subsequently marketed, while Panini Comics began publishing a tie-in comic book series in 1996. Two animated television series were also produced to tie in with the toy line, with the first running for twenty-six episodes between 1995 and 1996. The second show ran for two seasons and twenty-six episodes from 2000 to 2001 and depicted a new incarnation of Action Man. Action Man: Robot Atak, the first in a trilogy of direct-to-DVD animated films, was released in 2004, but this film trilogy did not share continuity with either of the Action Man TV series.

=== 30th Anniversary and special editions ===
In addition to the three 30th anniversary sets, a number of special edition figures were released, one of which was the 1996 reproduction football player, in a numbered box. As with others from 1996, this was the extremely limited articulation Hasbro Hall of Fame body, with a flocked hair head sculpt. This item would never have been intended as a toy, but merely a collectable. From 1997 to 2000, Action Man was also released in the uniforms and costumes from six James Bond movies. These included Thunderball, You Only Live Twice, The Spy Who Loved Me, GoldenEye, Tomorrow Never Dies, and The World Is Not Enough. In 2006, after the main toy line had ended, a number of Action Man: 40th Anniversary sets were released.

=== Cancellation and A.T.O.M. launch ===
The Action Man toy line ended in early 2006 and was replaced with Hasbro's A.T.O.M. series, a spin-off toy line of smaller action figures based on an animated TV show of the same name. This new series was thus rebranded as Action Man: A.T.O.M. in certain regions, including the United Kingdom. Panini Comics also launched a new tie-in comic book series, following the cancellation of their long-running Action Man title.

=== Subsequent revivals ===
In 2009, Hasbro briefly released a new wave of Action Man toys exclusively to Tesco stores.

During the 2011 New York Comic Con, Hasbro distributed a catalogue announcing upcoming toy lines, including a new incarnation of Action Man dubbed "The Action Man". The catalogue offered only a new illustration of Action Man alongside a new logo, with no indication of when this new toy line was intended for release.

In June 2016, IDW began publishing a new limited series of Action Man comic books, simply titled Action Man, to commemorate the 50th anniversary of the original Palitoy action figure.

== Appearance ==
As with the original Action Man releases of 1966, the first re-releases of Action Man in the 90s were simply re-packaged G.I. Joe figures, namely Duke, Cobra Commander, Stalker and Snake Eyes, in boxes that resembled the standard G.I. Joe: Hall of Fame blue packaging. Shortly thereafter Hasbro International developed packaging unique to the Action Man line, featuring bright orange coloration and a new Action Man logo.

The 1990s 12" Action Man was closer in construction to the poor quality imitations of the original line, featuring very limited articulation and equipment not to scale. These figures were essentially G.I. Joe Hall of Fame bodies with a different set of head moulds, some of which had "fuzzy" hair. Some later examples improved on the articulation, though this was dependent on the price point. The figures were marked "©Hasbro International 1993" across the buttocks. Some came with blue shorts, reminiscent of the late 70s–80s body. The articulation of neck, waist, arms and legs varied as mentioned. Some, like Tiger Strike had rubber legs, no waist, elbow or wrist pivot, and a head that only looks left/right. Even the more articulated versions did not compare to the range of motion offered by their Palitoy predecessors. For example, the knee/ankle joints only pivot up/down, do not rotate, and the waist does not allow for rotation to the extent possible with earlier figures. The feet on all body variants were not to scale with the body, making the figures difficult to pose freestanding. The more articulated bodies were also of a harder plastic, rather than the softer vinyl/rubber used for basic figure limbs that were similar to Barbie's "Ken". Basic figures were available in a variety of configurations such as Tiger Strike and Sport Extreme, as well as deluxe sets such as Sky Dive, CrimeBuster and Raid and Roller Extreme. The more expensive sets contained the more articulated figures.

=== Vehicles and accessories ===
A number of vehicles were offered for the 12" figure line, with bold graphics and the signature orange background coloration. Included were the Super Bike, Mission Raft, 4×4 Jeep, Silver Speeder, Racing Car and others. A variety of accessories and uniform sets were also offered at this time. As with the boxed figures, the first releases were repackaged G.I. Joe Hall of Fame sets, with similarly designed packaging, subsequently replaced with the new orange graphics and new Action Man logo.

== Characters ==
Many recurring heroes and villains have featured in the toy line, TV series and comic book. The most notable are listed below.

=== Action Force ===
- Action Man - the eponymous protagonist of the franchise and leader of the Action Force, typically referred to exclusively by the 'Action Man' moniker.
- Red Wolf - Action Man's Native American teammate. Two types of action figure were released.
- Flynt - Australian teammate. Two styles of action figure were released.

=== Council of Doom ===
Dr. X is a mad scientist who is the arch-enemy of Action Man within the Action Man canon, introduced in the mid-late 1990s. Despite being constantly defeated and often humiliated by Action Man, Dr. X remains bent on world domination and is prepared to kill anyone who stands in his way. Dr. X recruited many villainous allies into his schemes across the history of the franchise, such as Professor Gangrene (1997, 2000, 2002, 2003), MAXX (or 'the man with no name') (1999), Tempest (2001), Asazi (from the 2000 animated series), Anti-Freeze (2003), and No-Face (2004). Dr. X and his allies were at times collectively referred to as the 'Council of Doom' in the Panini Comics series.

Several variations of Dr. X action figures were released, often with unique accessories or gimmicks: in 1994, a rotary, firing shield; in 1995, a laser eye & exposed brain; in 1996, a bio-stomach (toxic gut); in 1997, a firing hand; in 1998, a chopper motorbike; in 1999, a laughter button; in 2000, a robotic arm; in 2001, a bronze arm with a ball and chain; in 2002, a firing missile arm; in 2003, a titanium arm; in 2005 a new body and an accompanying komodo dragon named Dragon X.

== Video games ==
Several Action Man video games were released over the franchise's history, including Action Man: Destruction X (PlayStation/PC, 2000), Action Man: Raid on Island X (PC, 1999), Action Man: Jungle Storm (PC, 2000), Action Man: Operation Extreme (PlayStation/PC, 2000), Action Man: Arctic Adventure (PC, 2002), and Action Man: Search for Base X (GBC, 2001), as well as the movie tie-in game Action Man: Robot Atak (GBA, 2004).

== Comics ==
=== Panini series ===
Panini Comics published an Action Man comic book between 1996 and 2006, which ran for 138 issues before it was replaced by Panini's short-lived Action Man: A.T.O.M. comic. The title was published every three weeks. Following the 2002 cancellation of the Action Man TV series, the comic would be the only source of official ongoing story line for Action Man, aside from a trilogy of direct-to-DVD films. The final editor was Ed Caruana, who would go on to edit Panini's A.T.O.M. series. Panini Comics also own the Marvel UK licence, with Marvel UK having previously published an Action Force comic during the 1980s.

=== IDW series ===
The Action Man character was again rebooted by IDW Publishing in 2016 for a four-issue limited comic book series. This rebooted version of the character was placed within the shared continuity of IDW's Hasbro Comic Book Universe, later appearing in the crossover storylines Revolution and First Strike alongside several other Hasbro characters. A one-shot issue titled Action Man: Revolution was released in conjunction with the former storyline in October the same year. IDW also released a trade paperback collecting all five Action Man issues in 2017. Unlike the previous Panini Comics series, this series did not tie-in with any toy lines.

== Potential film ==
In 2012, film studio Emmett/Furla/Oasis Films signed a deal to work on a cinematic feature-length live-action film adaptation of Action Man with Hasbro Studios and its subsidiary company Allspark Pictures, along with other Hasbro properties such as the board games Monopoly (with Lionsgate) and Hungry Hungry Hippos. The expectation was that work on the first film, "Monopoly", would start in 2013. In 2018, Paramount Players said James Bobin will direct the film from Simon Farnaby's script.

In 2026, a new script by Simon Hatt and Anthony Sellitti would be developed at Working Title Films.

== See also ==
- Action Man
- Action Man: 40th Anniversary
- A.T.O.M, a spin-off of Action Man
- Max Steel
- G.I. Joe
- Geyperman
