= Action Man: Robot Atak =

- DVD cover
- Directed by: John Moffett; Steven Burch; Chris Woods
- Written by: Alan Grant
- Produced by: Lee Hill; Steven Burch; Laura Burridge; Anna Lord; Eric Barrett; Carissa Buffel
- Starring: Oliver Milburn; Eric Meyers; Jesse Spencer; Steven Berkoff; Pierre Maubouché; Johnny Daukes; Talia Shively
- Music by: Scott Hackwith
- Production company: Arcana Digital
- Distributed by: Hasbro; Panini Comics
- Release date: September 24, 2004
- Running time: 45 minutes
- Country: United States
- Language: English

Action Man: Robot Atak is a 2004 American animated superhero film based on the Hasbro toy line Action Man. The film was produced by Arcana Digital and directed by John Moffett, Steven Burch and Chris Woods. Released to tie-in with the line of Action Man toys released in 2004, Robot Atak was the first in a trilogy of direct-to-video films and was followed by a sequel in 2005, Action Man: X Missions - The Movie.

== Plot ==
The world's leading toxins specialist, Professor Moran, is kidnapped by a villain named No-Face while in disguise as Action Man in order to frame him for the kidnapping. No-Face intends to force Moran to make him a mind control gas. Action Man and Action Force become wanted criminals and their base becomes surrounded by the authorities. No-Face takes Moran to Island X, where he reveals that he has constructed an army of 'X-Robots' which begin terrorising cities across the world. No Face has also began rebuilding Dr. X and brings him back to life as he was previously defeated by Action Man. Action Force escape their base with some of their equipment and vehicles and go on the run whilst battling X-Robots along the way. In one instance, Action Man places a tracker on an X-tank and tracks the robot's location to Island X. Action Force make their way there and later find out about Dr. X and No Face's plan to turn the world's population into their slaves using Moran's mind control gas. After several confrontations and battles, the evil plan is thwarted and the base is destroyed thanks to Flynt redirecting the missiles containing the gas to their launch point. Action Force leave with Moran, though they do not realise that Dr. X and No-Face have survived the explosion.

== Cast ==
Actor	Role
Oliver Milburn	Action Man
Eric Meyers	Red Wolf
Jesse Spencer	Flynt
Steven Berkoff	Dr. X
Pierre Maubouche	No-Face
Johnny Daukes	Professor Moran

== Music ==
The music for the film was composed by Scott Hackwith. The sound was created at Grand Central Studios UK by Adam West.

== Release ==
The film was released direct to home video, with the DVD being given away free as a cover gift with issue #119 of Panini's Action Man comic book (in a regular-sized plastic DVD case) and also with the News of the World newspaper (cardboard slipcase) in 2004. This release differed from that of the film's sequel, which was sold in shops and also received a VHS release. The film was released to tie-in with and promote the 2004 range of Action Man toys, with many of the costumes, vehicles and equipment from that year being seen in the film. All the toys from the range were also displayed on the back of the DVD case. The spelling of the film's title was adjusted to Robot Attack in some regions.

== Video game ==
Action Man: Robot Atak
- Developer: Magic Pockets
- Publisher: Atari
- Series: Action Man
- Platform: Game Boy Advance
- Release: September 24, 2004
- Genre: Action
- Mode: Single-player

A tie-in video game of the same name was released on September 24, 2004 for the Game Boy Advance. The game was developed by Magic Pockets and published by Atari.

=== Gameplay ===
The game features side-scrolling stages and action and platform-orientated gameplay. In most levels the only playable character is Action Man, but in some stages the player has to change character to Red Wolf, Flint or Kongo in order to progress. There are several 'AM' logos scattered throughout each level which can be collected for a 1-Up. The player could also log on to the Action Man website to get an exclusive password when the game was first released.

== Sequels ==
Robot Atak was followed by two sequels, the first of which, Action Man: X-Missions - the Movie, was produced by Paramount Pictures and released commercially to DVD and VHS in 2005. The film continued the story begun in Robot Atak and featured the central cast reprising their roles, whilst also featuring the film debut of Professor Gangrene, a recurring antagonist in the Action Man comic book and TV series. X-Missions also re-used several CGI character models from the direct-to-DVD film G.I. Joe: Valor vs. Venom, itself also based on a Hasbro toy property.

The third and final film in the trilogy, Action Man: X-Missions - Code Gangrene, was only released in Mexico as a tie-in with an exclusive toy line. Thus, the third film is only available in Spanish.

== See also ==
- Action Man (TV series)
