= John Ross (artist) =

- Born: John Ross
- Areas: Penciler, Inker
- Notable works: Doctor Who "spiderman heroes and villains"

John Ross is a comic book artist who lives and works in the UK.

== Biography ==
Ross started working for Panini Comics in 1996, working on titles such as Masked Rider, Action Man and Spectacular Spider-Man Adventures. During this time he also worked on occasional covers for various of Panini's Marvel US reprint titles and the main strip in Doctor Who Magazine.

More recently he worked on the Jackie Chan Adventures for Eaglemoss and the first six issues of Doctor Who - Battles in Time for Fabbri.

John is now the resident artist on the Doctor Who Adventures strip for the BBC.

== Bibliography ==
- Doctor Who:
  - Doctor Who Magazine:
    - "Uroborus" (with Scott Gray, in Doctor Who Magazine #319-322, collected in Oblivion, 228 pages, 2006, ISBN 1-905239-45-9)
    - "Sins of the Fathers" (with Scott Gray, in Doctor Who Magazine #343-345, collected in The Flood, 226 pages, 2007, ISBN 978-1-905239-65-8)
    - "Mr Nobody" (Doctor Who Annual 2006)
    - "Bus Stop" (with Rob Davis, in Doctor Who Magazine #385)
  - Doctor Who - Battles in Time: "Growing Terror" (with Stephen Cole #1-6)
