= Man of Action =

Man of Action may refer to:

== Film and television ==
- The Man of Action, a 1919 German silent film
- A Man of Action (1923 film), an American silent comedy film
- Man of Action (film), a 1933 American Western film
- A Man of Action (2022 film), a Spanish crime drama film
- "A Man of Action" (Dad's Army), a 1974 TV episode
- Man of Action Entertainment, an American film, television, and comics writer collective

== Music ==
- "Man of Action", a song by the Matthew Good Band from The Audio of Being, 2001
- "Man of Action", a song by Utopia from POV, 1985
- "Man of Action", a song composed by Les Reed, the theme tune for Radio North Sea International 1970–1974

== See also ==
- Action Man (disambiguation)
- Men of Action, a 1935 American film
