= Action Man (comics) =

- Final issue of Action Man, published by Panini Comics in 2006.

Publication information
- Publisher: Panini Comics, Marvel UK
- Schedule: Every three weeks
- Format: Ongoing series
- Genre: Superhero
- Publication date: 1996 – January 2006
- No. of issues: 138

Creative team
- Written by: Simon Frith (2005); Jason Quinn (2004); Andy Price (2003)
- Artists: John Ross (2003, 2005); Martin Griffiths (2004)
- Letterer(s): Nicholas Norman (2003), Alex Foot (2005), James Clarkson (2004)
- Colorist(s): Alan Craddock (2003), Junior Tomlin (2004-5)
- Editor: Ed Caruana

Action Man is a British comic book series published by Panini Comics, based on the Hasbro toy line of the same name. It ran for 138 issues between 1996 and January 18, 2006 before being surpassed by spin-off series Action Man: A.T.O.M.. The comic was initially published every month, with this later changing to every three weeks. The final editor was Ed Caruana, with previous editors including Rob Jones.

== Publication history ==
Panini Comics began publishing Action Man in 1996, with the Marvel Comics logo being featured on the cover for the first few years of publication. Panini had obtained the Marvel UK licence in 1995, with Marvel UK having themselves previously published an Action Force comic during the 1980s.

Further to the regular monthly issues, Panini would occasionally publish additional issues, including a 'Christmas Special' in 2000. Egmont Books also published a series of collected editions in 2001, typically with two stories per title.

After ten years and 138 issues, the Panini series ceased publication in January 2006. It was subsequently replaced by a spin-off title, Action Man: A.T.O.M., published by Panini in as a tie-in with Hasbro's recently-launched A.T.O.M. toy line. Simon Furman was the primary writer for this new series.

== Strip ==
The comic strip was the main feature for each issue, with the narratives invariably focusing on Action Man's efforts to thwart the evil plans of his arch enemy, the mad scientist Dr. X, and his 'Council of Doom'. Initially, the stories in each issue featured little to no continuity between them, but as the comic progressed, continuing story arcs would become more prominent. Several new characters, both enemies and allies of Action Man, were introduced over the title's run. The first strip featured in the comic was named "Into Action".

=== 2003 arc ===
2003 introduced the fictional 'Island X', an X-shaped island home to Dr. X and the Council of Doom. This would become the setting for many stories for years to come. The plot focused on Dr. X building a huge 'Death Ray' on Island X which he would use to destroy capital cities across the world unless he was made world leader. Action Man had to explore Island X in his quest to find the Doctor's base, with several confrontations ensuing before their final battle in issue #100. The outcome was shown in the following issue on a giant poster, with Dr. X falling to his death. A new villain named Antifreeze was also introduced in 2003 as a member of the Council of Doom.

=== 2004 arc ===
2004 saw the introduction of two new Action Force teammates for Action Man: Native American archer, Redwolf, and the Australian extreme sportsman, Flynt. The central plot for this story arc centred on the new villain 'No-Face' creating an army of 'X Robots', built in the late Dr. X's image, to spread terror across the world before later resurrecting Dr. X as a cyborg. No-Face then kidnapped a scientist named Professor Moran and forced him to make a mind control gas for Dr. X, which could help the doctor achieve his goal of taking over the world. No-Face was a master of disguise who was able to frame Action Man for the kidnapping of Moran. Initially, Professor Moran refused to help the villainous duo, but Dr. X claimed he would blow up every capital city in Europe if Moran didn't help him. The story arc culminated in issue #119, published in November 2004, where Moran was ultimately rescued by Action Force and Dr. X temporarily defeated. No-Face would continue to serve as the doctor's primary accomplice.

The 2004 direct-to-DVD film Action Man: Robot Atak adapted this story arc, with the DVD being given away as a cover gift with the comic.

=== X-Missions (2005 arc) ===
The final story arc was entitled 'X-Missions', beginning in issue #120 with the story 'Tokyo Terror'. The X-Missions logo was featured on the cover of each issue during the course of the arc, as well as on the boxes of the action figures released between 2005 and 2006. The plot involved Dr. X harnessing animal DNA and using it to create a 'Terror Toxin' chemical. He planned to use this on innocent people to turn them into a personal army of 'Toxic Troopers'. Some X-Robots were also upgraded to become 'Toxic Robots' which had large blades in place of their hands. Additionally, Action Man had to complete ten deadly missions that Dr. X had set out for him, hence the title of the story arc. A direct to VHS and DVD film titled Action Man: X-Missions - The Movie was also released in 2005 and featured some similar plot elements.

The final story to be printed in the comic was titled "Island of Terror!" and was written by Simon Frith, with art by John Ross.

== Contents ==
- 'Mission Brief' - introduction providing additional context for the strip.
- Comic strip
- Colouring page
- Character profiles, features on past stories from the comic etc.
- Competition - often for the toy featured in the issue's strip. Other competition prizes included video games and DVDs.
- Puzzles
- Posters - a giant pull-out poster in the centre of the comic and occasional back cover poster.
- Letters page featured reader letters and artwork, with the prize of a free action figure being awarded to each issue's 'star letter'. This section had various character-themed names over the comic's course, including 'Action Stations', 'Gangrene's Gunk Mail', 'Antifreezes Cool Mail' and 'Dr X's Hate Mail'.

== Collected editions ==
In 2001, Egmont Books published a series of books each containing two strips from random issues of the comic, priced at £1.99 each. A poster would typically also be included. Published titles included the following:

- Action Man: Extreme Adventures ['Demolition Derby'; 'Armed and Dangerous!'] (ISBN 0-7497-4619-X)
- Action Man: X Hunter ['Smash 'n' Grab'; 'Rumble in the Jungle'] (ISBN 0-7497-4622-X)

== See also ==
- Action Man
- Action Man (1993-2006 toyline)
- Action Man (1995 TV series)
- Action Man (2000 TV series)
- A.T.O.M.
