= Alli Mauzey =

American actress and singer

- Born: Anaheim, California, U.S.
- Education: New York University Tisch School of the Arts
- Occupations: Actress; singer
- Website: allimauzey.com

Alli Mauzey (born in Anaheim, California) is an American actress and singer whose works include Glinda in the Broadway and 1st national tour productions of Wicked and the role of Lenora in the musical Cry-Baby, as well as the main character voice acting role of Lioness in the animated series A.T.O.M..

== Education and career ==
Mauzey has a B.F.A. in drama from New York University's Tisch School of the Arts.

She made her Broadway debut in 2002, as Brenda in Hairspray, and also performed in the First National Tour.

In 2007, Mauzey originated the role of Lenora in the musical Cry-Baby, for which she won a Theatre World Award and was nominated for a Drama League Award. She also originated the role of Lenora in the pre-Broadway production of Cry-Baby at the La Jolla Playhouse in San Diego (Theatre Critics Circle Award).

Mauzey starred on Broadway as Glinda the Good in Wicked, a role she also performed to critical acclaim on the First National Tour and in the San Francisco company.

She performed as Ernestina in the Tony Award-winning revival of Hello, Dolly! from March to August 2018.

Mauzey's other New York credits include Minerva in the New York City Center Encores! production of The Golden Apple, Sydney in It's a Bird... It's a Plane... It's Superman, Ellie May Shipley in Show Boat with the New York Philharmonic, and Selma in the Off-Broadway production of Red Eye of Love. Regionally, she has appeared as Mallory in City of Angels for Reprise! in Los Angeles, Snookie in 110 in the Shade at the Pasadena Playhouse, and Audrey in Little Shop of Horrors at The Muny, for which she was nominated for a Kevin Kline Award.

In September 2021, it was announced that Mauzey was cast in the world premiere of the musical, Kimberly Akimbo, which opened off-Broadway at Atlantic Theater Company on December 8, 2021. She then reprised her role on the Broadway production of the musical, which began previews at the Booth Theatre on October 12, 2022 and officially opened on November 10, 2022. The production won many awards, including the Tony Award for Best Musical and the Drama Desk Award for Outstanding Musical, among others.

She is also known for her voice-acting roles in the English-language French animated series A.T.O.M. – Alpha Teens on Machines, in which she played Catalina "Lioness" Leone, one of the five main characters who appeared in all 52 episodes of the series, and Firekat, a major character in the second season.
