= List of A.T.O.M. episodes =

The following is a list of episodes for the English-language French animated television series A.T.O.M.

A number of episodes were aired out of order for unknown reasons. This results in some chronological mistakes, such as Axel mentioning meeting Paine's daughter in episode 4, when the encounter does not take place until episode 10.

== Series overview ==
Season	Episodes	Originally released	
Season	Episodes	First released	Last released
1	26	August 27, 2005	April 15, 2006
2	26	September 2, 2006	April 3, 2007

== Episodes ==
=== Season 1 (2005–06) ===
No. overall	No. in season	Title	Written by	Storyboard by	Original release date	Prod. code
1	1	"A Paine by Any Other Name Part I"	Greg Klein, Tom Pugsley	Jean-Louis Champault, Patrick Lambert, Olivier Güss Thulliez	August 27, 2005	01-01
After competing in and completing the reality show, Trackdown, the five contestants, Axel, Hawk, King, Lioness and Shark are offered jobs to test new and experimental vehicles for Mr Lee, Trackdown’s creator and president and founder of Lee Industries, a multi-billion dollar company. The five accept his offer, but when a dangerous criminal mastermind named Alexander Paine escapes from prison, Axel has personal interest in helping recapture him.
2	2	"A Paine by Any Other Name Part II"	Greg Klein, Tom Pugsley	Patrick Lambert, Olivier Güss Thulliez	August 27, 2005	01-02
Lee, who is acting clingy and parental around the team, equips them with new gear and weaponry to test. At the same time Paine and his henchman Spydah seek to destroy the Landmark City dam. Axel also tells Lioness about his past with Paine.
3	3	"Touch of Paine"	Greg Klein, Tom Pugsley	Laurent Salou, Fafah Togora	August 28, 2005	01-03
The Alpha Teens move out of Lee’s R & D physicality and into an abandoned Aquatic Center. Meanwhile, due to a freak accident caused by Axel previously, Paine gains new powers that emit terrible pain through his body which he can transfer to those he touches. With these powers, Spydah and added help from the acrobatic Cannonball Bros., Paine goes to Lee Industries, seeking revenge on Axel Manning.
4	4	"Of the Flesh"	Kevin Hopps	Stéphane Annette, Jean-Louis Champault	September 4, 2005	01-04
Paine learns of Nutronium, a chemical that can put an end to his constant pain. He and Spydah seek to steal it with the help of Albert, a dangerous muscle-laden criminal who uses a barbell for a weapon. In the heat of battle with the Alpha Teens, Paine unintentionally mutates Albert into the super-strong giant, Flesh.
5	5	"Trapped"	Rob Hoegee	Stéphane Annette, Laurent Salou	September 11, 2005	01-05
The Alpha Teens, Lee and the building security board head of Landmark City become trapped in the yet to be opened Lee Plaza. The culprit, Silas Greene, the building’s deranged architect, seeks revenge against Lee by using the building’s security robots and other lethal functions to dispose of him.
6	6	"The Experiment"	Simon Jowett	Olivier Güss Thulliez, Fafah Togora	September 11, 2005	01-06
The Alpha Teens accompany Hawk, who stars in the movie being filmed, "Radioactive Island", to an island that served as a military testing site. While King’s animalistic nature unintentionally steals Hawk’s thunder, it also gets the attention of Recombo, a mad scientist who combines different species of animals into one.
7	7	"In Too Deep"	Baz Hawkins	Jean-Louis Champault, Damien Tromel	September 18, 2005	01-07
When Shark skips out on a fancy party held by Lee on his yacht, he is captured by the villain, Doctor Eel. With various sea creatures under his mind-control, Eel sends his "pet" giant squids to sink Lee’s yacht.
8	8	"Enter the Dragon"	Ben Townsend	Miguel Gaban, Patrick Lambert, Olivier Güss Thulliez	October 1, 2005	01-08
At Christmas time, while the other Alpha Teen members are packing to visit their families, a lonely Axel thinks of his late father, Sebastian. He is attacked by Dragon, a ninja mercenary, who like Axel, is skilled in the Jo-Lan martial arts.
9	9	"The Final Frontier"	Steven Melching	Stéphane Annette, Patrick Lambert	October 8, 2005	01-09
Bogey, a rival of Hawk’s, gets under Hawk’s skin at an airshow. Later, Hawk and the other Alpha Teens are trained to fly Mr. Lee’s Hypersonic Stratojet, an aircraft Paine has every intention on stealing.
10	10	"Natural Magnetism"	Kevin Hopps	Laurent Salou, Olivier Güss Thulliez	October 15, 2005	01-10
On their way to the frosty Iron Mountain, the Alpha Teens are greeted by Dr. Magness, a doctor at a ski resort. After a wired rash of incidents involving the team’s vehicles, including a car crash that injured Lioness’s leg, she suspects that there is more to Dr. Magness than her teammates realize.
11	11	"Double Image"	Marty Isenberg	Stéphane Annette, Jean-Louis Champault	November 15, 2005	01-11
As Paine plots to steal plutonium from Landmark City’s nuclear power plant, Col. Richter of Landmark City’s law enforcement thinks (with very strong video evidence) that Axel stole an armored car filled with money. At the same time, Axel’s father, Sebastian Manning, seems to be alive.
12	12	"I, Paine"	Greg Klein, Tom Pugsley	Richard Fabbi, Patrick Lambert, Fafah Togora	November 12, 2005	01-12
Paine steals cyborgs from one of Lee’s factories. Having Spydah duplicate their schematics and create more, Paine now controls his own cyborg army.
13	13	"Stormy Weather"	Ben Townsend	Richard Fabbi, Fafah Togora	November 19, 2005	01-13
Paine unleashes a huge hurricane on Landmark City with the Atmospheric Modifier, a device made by Dr. Nimbus, whose family Paine is holding hostage.
14	14	"Royal Rumble"	Sean Jara	Stéphane Annette, Olivier Güss Thulliez	November 26, 2005	01-14
King has his eyes set on winning the WWC World Title Belt under the guise as the wrestler Royal Rumble. Paine however, seeks the belt for his own dastardly schemes and hires the rhyming extortionist, Vinnie Rossi to stand in for an injured Flesh. During the WWC battle royal for the title, Vinnie’s lovesickness for Lioness could cost him the match and much more.
15	15	"House of Paine"	Tony Schillaci	Stephane Annette, Jean-Louis Champault	December 3, 2005	01-15
Lee introduces the Alpha Teens to the somewhat insecure teenage genius, Garrett. In another scheme to ease his own inner pain, Paine sends Flesh and Spydah to kidnap Dr. Evans, an expert in sound wave research and Garrett’s former professor at Landmark University.
16	16	"Spydah, Spiders Everywhere"	Eugene Son	Patrick Lambert, Laurent Salou	December 10, 2005	01-16
After Spydah is fired by Paine for failing to get a crucial flash drive that was protected by the Alpha Teens, he intends to prove himself to his former boss.
17	17	"Dem Bonez"	Ben Townsend	Arnold Gransac, Patrick Lambert, Fafah Togora	January 28, 2006	01-17
After Lee’s Mecha Speeder and the crew of the cargo ship that held the vehicle go missing, the Alpha Teens are sent to investigate on Halloween night. What they find is a virtually lost portion of Landmark City filled with zombies. Their leader, Bonez, soon makes Hawk, Shark and Lioness part of their ranks.
18	18	"Omega Team"	Matthew Cope	Roland Boschi, Jean-Louis Champault, Olivier Güss Thulliez	January 21, 2006	01-18
After being stopped by the Alpha Teens once again, Paine enlists the aid of five extreme athletes to take them out once and for all.
19	19	"Daddy's Little Girl"	Simon Jowett	Stéphane Annette, Jean-Louis Champault	January 28, 2006	01-19
Magness returns to Landmark City with her new biker boyfriend, D-Zel. She systematically causes problems for Landmark City, the Alpha Teens and her father, Paine. D-Zel experiences a change that makes him truly one with his bike.
20	20	"Breakout"	Sean Jara	Stéphane Annette, Hélène Cnockaert	February 4, 2006	01-20
When a corrupt cop falsely accuses the Alpha Teens of grand theft auto, they become fugitives of the law. Worse yet, Hawk and King are captured, arrested and sentenced to serve time in the same prison where some of the villains they busted were sent to.
21	21	"Black Out"	Silvie Barro Morincome, Ben Townsend	Christof Lefebure, Fafah Togora	February 17, 2006	01-21
After a meteorite temporarily knocks out all power within Landmark City, Paine intends to steal it to make the city go through a much more permanent blackout. Also, Hawk poses as the leader of the Alpha Teens so he could impress reporter, Michelle Moreno.
22	22	"The Big Sleep"	Steven Melching	Patrick Lambert, Christof Lefebure	April 2, 2006	01-22
Flesh and Spydah poison Axel with potent venom from a very toxic water spider. As Axel, who is using Jo-Lan to slow down the toxin’s deadly effects, is getting medical attention, Shark is put in charge of the team by Axel himself.
23	23	"The Sword of Jo Lan"	Ben Townsend	Olivier Güss Thulliez, Fafah Togora	April 15, 2006	01-23
The mystical sword of Jo-Lan is stolen from the Landmark City museum by a group of ninjas and the Alpha Teens go all the way to Hong Kong to recover it. Dragon returns with interest in the sword, mysterious intentions and unsure alliances.
24	24	"Underworld"	Sean Jara	Hélène Cnockaert, Patrick Lambert	April 15, 2006	01-24
As the Alpha Teens finally discover where Paine’s base is located, Paine seeks to tunnel under Landmark City flood the city with lava. However, because of the intense heat of the lava, Paine forces Vinnie Rossi, now the monstrous concrete man, Mass, to do the job, or else his mother will pay the price.
25	25	"Remote Control"	Greg Klein, Tom Pugsley	Roland Boschi, Patrick Lambert	April 15, 2006	01-25
Now, without a base to call home, Paine seeks to use a remote that can control electronic devices to blackmail Landmark City into giving him enough money to rebuild. Lioness's cousin from Brazil, Eliza comes to visit and immediately has Hawk and Shark attracted to her. Axel and Garrett stumble into a mysterious room of Lee Industries that is off limits to anyone but Lee himself.
26	26	"Showdown"	Sean Jara	Stéphane Annette, Olivier Güss Thulliez	April 15, 2006	01-26
Ten years at the day since the potential death of his father due to a bomb created by Paine, a frustrated Axel seeks to put Paine out of commission for good, even if it means interfering with police business and splitting up the team. Meanwhile, Lee creates a lizard-like creature called the "Axel Manning advanced enhancement".

=== Season 2 (2006–07) ===
No. overall	No. in season	Title	Written by	Storyboard by	Original release date	Prod. code
27	1	"Deception"	Greg Klein, Tom Pugsley	Stéphane Annette, Thomas Allart	September 2, 2006	02-01
The Alpha Teens are fired from their jobs with Lee and kicked out of their home! Faced with the prospect of "real jobs" and the prospect of being homeless, things get worse when a strange hybrid creature named Tilian comes after Axel, intent on killing him. Will the gang find a new home? Will Axel survive? And just what does Mr Lee have to do with Tilian?
28	2	"Revelation"	Greg Klein, Tom Pugsley	Patrick Lambert, Olivier Thulliez	September 9, 2006	02-02
Lee reveals to Axel that his creature, Tilian, is Axel’s mutated clone. He tells Axel his true intentions which subsequently gets him stripped of all his power at Lee Industries. Lee then experiments on himself in order to become super-intelligent and super-strong, but the Alpha Teens ruin this experiment – thus, Lee went completely insane. Lee mentions a Mu-Team and that Tilian isn't his only clone. Also still finding work, Shark and Hawk compete as ice cream men.
29	3	"Movin' on Down"	Ben Townsend	Jean-Louis Champault, Hélène Cnockaert	September 16, 2006	02-03
With the Aquatic Center totaled by Paine, Spydah and Tilian collectively, and still trying to find paying jobs, the Alpha Teens make a rundown apartment their new home. Garrett, though may have a solution to their problem. Meanwhile, Lee sends mutant clones of Lioness and King, Firekat and Wrecka respectively, to destroy the team.
30	4	"From Beneath the Sea"	Kevin Hopps	Fafah Togora, Christof Lefebure	September 23, 2006	02-04
Shark lands a job as a lifeguard where he meets a beautiful scientist named Dr. Rachel Logan and they take instant liking of each other. Unfortunately Mr. Lee has Rayza, Shark’s mutant clone, kidnap Rachel. Hawk is taught the basics of swimming as he and the other members of the Alpha Teens are attacked by his mutant clone, Stingfly.
31	5	"Resurrection"	Simon Jowett	Stéphane Annette, Thomas Allart	September 30, 2006	02-05
Lioness is asked to give a public speech at a fundraiser, bringing to the surface her old fears. Lee lures Axel into a trap and sends the Mu-Team, including a thought-to-be-dead Tilian, to capture him.
32	6	"Brain Drain"	Glenn Leopold	Patrick Lambert, Olivier Thulliez	October 7, 2006	02-06
Needing a bit of extra intelligence to correct a design flaw (with Hard Light), Mr. Lee takes over the advanced school where King's brother, Duke, attends. The process in which Lee uses to siphon all the students' intelligence into Duke turns him evil and gives him telekinesis.
33	7	"Camping with the Enemy"	Eugene Son	Fafah Togora, Jean-Louis Champault	October 14, 2006	02-07
King takes the team camping in Blue Pines National Park for his birthday. The park, however, has become nothing as King described it. A vicious mutant, combined of different animals, is loose in the park.
34	8	"Paine Relief"	Ben Townsend	Hélène Cnockaert, Christof Lefebure	October 21, 2006	02-08
Paine receives a letter with a photo of himself, Axel's father and some other people who are crossed out and he also receives a disk from which he is very scared. He wants Axel to guard him and he promises to tell him about his father. Dragon and an army of ninjas kidnap Paine and Axel and his friends go to save him. When they rescue Paine and put him back in jail he gives Axel a picture of his father and a man whose face is burned from the picture. Paine tells Axel that when he finds the person on the picture he will find his answers.
35	9	"A Shock to the System"	Simon Furman	Jun Violet, Dominique Etchecopar	October 28, 2006	02-09
A new airplane is created by a friend of Garrett. However Garrett does not trust him, so Axel is told to check out the plane. When Garrett's friend spots him he is forced to leave. Then the Mu-team arrive to steal the plane, but Axel, Lioness, Shark, King and Hawk stop them. The Mu-team then smash a building and Shark saves the building but gets zapped by an electrical wire and becomes unconscious, meanwhile the Mu-team steal the airplane. When Shark awakens he believes himself to be a military person. The team are told to listen to Shark or he may sustain brain damage. Later the Mu-team uses the airplane to steal an experimental liquid, and Tilian drinks it, making him grow into a giant, but the team defeats them and Shark is returned to normal.
36	10	"Perchance to Dream"	Marty Isenberg	Thomas Allart, Stéphane Annette	November 4, 2006	02-10
After Mr. Lee breaks Recombo out of prison, Recombo invades the dreams of the A.T.O.M. team.
37	11	"Fathers and Daughters"	Simon Jowett	Serge Tanguy, Olivier Thulliez	November 11, 2006	02-11
Lioness' neglectful rocker father comes to visit, hoping to mend fences with his daughter. Meanwhile, Magness is planning a major heist – at the very concert the team is attending!
38	12	"Programmed"	Greg Klein, Tom Pugsley	Jean-Louis Champault, Jun Violet	November 18, 2006	02-12
While searching through Mr. Lee's soon-to-be destroyed mansion, Axel discovers a canister with a map written by his father, directing him to his hometown. Meanwhile, Lee captures Dragon and creates his cybernetic clone in order to destroy Axel once and for all.
39	13	"The Girls from Brazil"	Ben Townsend	Patrick Lambert, Stéphane Annette	January 1, 2007	02-13
During a call to Lioness, her cousin Eliza is attacked and kidnapped. The team travels to Brazil to rescue her.
40	14	"The Mu-Toys"	Glenn Leopold	Hélène Cnockaert, Christof Lefebure	March 14, 2007	02-14
During the holiday season, King volunteers to be Santa at the local mall, Lioness as Mrs Claus with the others as his elves. The toys they give out, however, are not what they seem – Lee has added his "special" creative touch.
41	15	"The Kraken Awakens"	Ben Townsend	Louis Musso, Fafah Togora	March 22, 2007	02-15
When Rachel's marine biologist father, his boat, and his crew go missing after coming across the mysterious Kraken, it is up to the team to help her. Things only point to Lee as Rayza makes an appearance.
42	16	"Critical Mass"	Ben Townsend	Patrick Lambert, Christof Lefebure	March 23, 2007	02-16
Vinnie "The Mass" Rossi returns – now as molten magma man – bringing freak volcanic rifts all over the city. The reason behind his appearance? Lioness. On a side note, the extremeness of Hawk and Shark's snow fun causes $97 million in damages, which the city expects the two to pay.
43	17	"High Frontier"	Simon Jowett	Franck Leguay, Stéphane Annette	March 24, 2007	02-17
Lee and the Mu-Team take over the space station while Garrett is aboard making final adjustments. Able to send a message to the team, he asks for help. With no other options, the team "borrows" the still-experimental Cosmo Jet and gets spacebound.
44	18	"Fathers and Sons"	Glenn Leopold	Thomas Astruc, Olivier Thulliez	March 25, 2007	02-18
Axel tries to figure out what happened to his father, using everything he can remember to unlock the codes and his dad's files. Dragon appears out of the blue and engages Axel in a fight. Axel knocks him to the ground and removes his mask only to see... Sebastian Manning! In the end, it is revealed that the government was trying to clone a super-human, and all clones were marked with tattoos on their chests. Dragon removes his shirt to find that there is a tattoo on his chest, while Axel is devastated. As a side story, Hawk's ex-actor father drops in for a visit.
45	19	"Survival Skills"	Marty Isenberg	Louis Musso, Fafah Togora	March 26, 2007	02-19
Lured to a remote island with a recorded audio loop of Axel's father, the team falls into the trap of a demented game hunter, who considers them to be the ultimate prey.
46	20	"Zoo Story"	Simon Jowett	Stéphane Annette, Fafah Togora	March 27, 2007	02-20
A peaceful day at the city zoo for Axel, King, and Shark turns into another fight with Lee and the Mu-Team when the latter are there to use the zoo's newly acquired Hybridon (the mutant amalgam of animals responsible for the previous closing of Blue Pines National Park) for nefarious purposes. Meanwhile Hawk needs Lioness help to get a girl from her capoeira class but it does not turn out to smoothly as she is a nutter.
47	21	"The Oddest Couple"	Greg Klein, Tom Pugsley	Hélène Cnockaert, Franck Leguay	March 28, 2007	02-21
Wanting to prove himself to Lee and the Mu-Team, Wrecka goes to steal a shipment of Thurlium – increasing genetic mutations fivefold – alone. The only team member at home, Hawk is sent by Garrett to stop him. Problems arise when both are captured by Magness, who wants the Thirlium to increase her own magnetic powers, and they must work together to stop her.
48	22	"Secret Admirer"	Simon Jowett	Serge Tanguy, Jean-Louis Champault	March 29, 2007	02-22
After taking a page from the always-bickering Mu-Team, Lee sets out to break apart the Alpha Teens by setting them up to distrust one another and fight amongst themselves.
49	23	"Hyper Reality"	Marty Isenberg	Stéphane Annette, Fafah Togora	March 30, 2007	02-23
The team encounters a new foe, nicknamed "The Racer". His reason for being? Stealing one-of-a-kind vehicles! Note: The whole episode plays like an episode of some reality television program.
50	24	"Serving Two Masters"	Ben Townsend, Simon Jowett	Jun Violet	March 31, 2007	02-24
Hawk is given a part in a Kung-Fu movie in Hong Kong, but gets in over his head. As the other Alpha Teens come with him, they later investigate a mysterious dream Axel had of his father claiming that "Jo-Lan" is in danger.
51	25	"Full Circle"	Greg Klein, Tom Pugsley	Louis Musso, Olivier Thulliez	April 2, 2007	02-25
The Alpha Teens find Mr. Lee's hideout and come face to face with a Mu-Team who are growing tired of their creator.
52	26	"The Serpent's Tale"	Ben Townsend	Stéphane Annette, Jean-Louis Champault	April 3, 2007	02-26
Lee is chased around Landmark City by Dragon. He ends up in his office in Lee Industries and erases all of the files on the Mu-Team from his computer. Dragon is after those files, so he fights Lee. Lee falls off the roof of the building, his hard light armor saves him from the fall but his body starts to absorb the hard light. The process is irreversible. Lee also reverts to his "old self". Axel comes to Lee Industries, and Lee tells him that Dragon was Sebastian's clone he had created. Sebastian and Lee were friends, but Lee needed more money for his experiments, so he took it from the Serpent's Tail in exchange for government cloning secrets. Manning caught him and wanted to expose everything, so the Serpent's Tale took him out to protect their money. After that Lee didn't want anything more to do with them, so he quit the project, but the Serpent's Tail sent Dragon to find Lee. Lee regrets his actions, Axel leaves to find The Serpent's Tale leader, who is revealed to be Quan. Quan finishes off Lee and attacks the aquatic center. Axel and Quan fight, Dragon tries to protect Axel, a large explosion from one of the attack's leads to the building being about to corrupt. Quan and his other henchmen escape but the Alpha Teens can't get out. Lee appears as a ghost made of hard light and says that "science has given him a means to make amends for all he has done starting now". He teleports the teens and Dragon out of the building which then explodes.
