= Mark Griffin (actor) =

English actor

- Born: Mark David Charles Griffin; 25 February 1968 (age 58); Basingstoke, Hampshire, England
- Occupation: Actor
- Known for: Gladiators

Mark David Charles Griffin (born 25 February 1968) is an English actor known for his role as Trojan on the television series Gladiators.

== Early life ==
Born in Basingstoke, Hampshire, Griffin attended Brighton Hill secondary school. He played squash at a young age and was invited to National Squad Training Camp. He went on to become a bodybuilder.

== Career ==
Griffin's first acting role was in the 1995 TV series Action Man in which he played the live action version of the animated character.

He has since gone on to appear in various films including Daddy Day Care, Dr. Dolittle 2, The Hard Corps and I Am Vengeance, and had a lead role in Mark L. Lester's 2014 film Dragons of Camelot. He also had TV roles in Curb Your Enthusiasm, NCIS, Doctor Who and Strike Back: Legacy.

=== Theatre ===
During May 2015, Griffin starred in the Simon Stephens play Bluebird at the Tabard Theatre London.

=== Gladiators ===
Griffin appeared on Gladiators from 1993 to 1996, leaving to concentrate on his acting career.

=== Action Man ===
Griffin appeared on Action Man, in which he played the main character from 1995 to 1997.

=== Writing ===
Griffin wrote a book about his time on Gladiators in 1995 called Trojan: My Life with the Gladiators. ISBN 1852866934
