= A.T.O.M. (TV series) =

English-language French animated TV series

- The "Alpha Teens on Machines" team shown from left to right: Shark, Hawk, Axel, King and Lioness
- Also known as: Alpha Teens on Machines; Action Man: A.T.O.M.
- Genre: Action; Science fiction; Superhero
- Created by: Ariane Desrieux; Paul-Patrick Duval
- Directed by: Olivier Jongerlynck
- Voices of: James Arnold Taylor; Alli Mauzey; Aldis Hodge; Charlie Schlatter; Brian Donovan; Tom Kenny; Clancy Brown; Kari Wahlgren; Bill Fagerbakke; Keith Szarabajka
- Composers: Alain Garcia; Noam Kaniel
- Country of origin: France
- Original language: English (Note: All of the writers for the series, including season 1 co-producers Greg Klein and Tom Pugsley, are known to be from English-speaking countries and/or have written for English-language projects exclusively.)
- No. of seasons: 2
- No. of episodes: 52 (list of episodes)

Production
- Executive producers: Michael Lekes; Jacqueline Tordjman; Olivier Dumont (season 1); Stephanie Kirchmeyer (season 2)
- Producers: Bruno Bianchi; Greg Klein (season 1); Tom Pugsley (season 1); Sylvie Barro (season 2); Cyone Clark (season 2); Steve Granat (season 2)
- Running time: 22 minutes
- Production company: SIP Animation

Original release
- Network: Jetix
- Release: August 27, 2005 – April 3, 2007

Related
- Action Man (1995); Action Man (2000)

A.T.O.M. – Alpha Teens On Machines (known as Action Man: A.T.O.M. in some countries) is an English-language French superhero animated television series produced by SIP Animation in association with Jetix Europe.

The series focuses on the adventures of five teenagers in the fictional Landmark City. The eponymous Alpha Teens, which consist of Axel Manning (the team leader), Catalina Leone, Crey Kingston, Zack Hawkes, and Ollie Sharker, test experimental vehicles and weapons for Lee Industries, and use them to combat criminals, particularly the crime boss Alexander Paine.

In countries such as Australia, France, Germany, Italy, and the United Kingdom, (Note: In the UK, only merchandise was branded under the Action Man name; the series itself used the regular title without the Action Man prefix.) and in Latin America, the series was branded as Action Man: A.T.O.M., with Panini Comics publishing a tie-in comic book series by that title.

== Synopsis ==
Set in the fictional Landmark City, Janus Lee is the head of Lee Industries who holds a television contest as a front to recruit a group of talented teenagers. The winners of the contest, Axel, King, Lioness, Hawk and Shark, are given prototype weapons, gadgets, and vehicles and join forces as A.T.O.M. (short for Alpha Teens On Machines) to battle against the crime boss Alexander Paine who's also responsible for the death of Axel's father. Paine is assisted by his minions Spydah and Flesh, his daughter Magness, and the mysterious ninja Dragon. In addition, A.T.O.M. also fights other villains that cause havoc.

At the end of the first season, they manage to defeat Paine's group. However, it is revealed that Lee's true purpose was to use the teens' DNA to create clones enhanced with different animal DNA samples. During the second season, the Alpha Teens once again have to team up to stop Lee and his Mu-Team while taking on other villains that come into view.

== Episodes ==
Season	Episodes	Originally released	
Season	Episodes	First released	Last released
1	26	August 27, 2005	April 15, 2006
2	26	September 2, 2006	April 3, 2007

== Cast ==
=== Principal voice actors ===
- Clancy Brown as Alexander Paine
- Brian Donovan as Ollie "Shark" Sharker, Rayza
- Bill Fagerbakke as Albert "Flesh"
- Aldis Hodge as Crey "King" Kingston, Wrecka
- Tom Kenny as Janus Lee, Spydah, Radman
- Alli Mauzey as Catalina "Lioness" Leone, Firekat
- Charlie Schlatter as Zack "Hawk" Hawkes, Stingfly
- Keith Szarabajka as Dragon
- James Arnold Taylor as Axel Manning, Sebastian Manning, Cannonball Brothers, Tilian
- Kari Wahlgren as Samantha "Magness" Paine

=== Additional voices ===
- Jeff Bennett as Edge, Icarus
- Sirena Berman
- Jeff Black as Hybridon
- Steve Blum
- Brian Cummings as Vinnie "Mass" Rossi
- Jennifer Darling
- Susan Egan as Buffy
- Erin Fitzgerald as Dr. Rachelle Logan
- Nicholas Guest
- Jess Harnell as Colonel Richter, D-Zel, Optical
- Charles Howerton as Kip Hawkes Sr., Kip Hawkes Jr.
- Clyde Kusatsu as Master Qwan
- Maurice LaMarche as Dr. Eel/Dr. E. Elle, Judge Fender
- Yuri Lowenthal as Architect
- Danny Mann as Dr. Recombo, Police Sergeant Boone
- Pat Musick as Momma Rossi
- Byrne Offutt
- Alexander Polinsky as Garrett
- Pete Sepenuk as Bonez
- Lloyd Sherr
- James Sie as Terrence Yao
- Lauren Tom
- Isabella Way as Laura
- Thomas F. Wilson as Bogey

== Production ==
The series was first announced by Jetix on 6 September 2004 with the working title of The Insiders. It was specifically designed to appeal to young boys ages 6 to 9 with an Autumn 2005 release. Originally, while the series was going to feature a team of rebellious teenagers, it was only going to focus on the main character who "has the task of tracking down and catching 100 of the worst villains and the mastermind who set them free from prison, the notorious Mr. Pain." Jetix Europe were confirmed to handle all worldwide TV rights for the series, while in France and other French-speaking territories, SIP Animation would handle the TV rights, with servicing through Buena Vista International Television. Hasbro was announced as the master toy licensee for The Insiders later the same month. Interim CEO of Jetix Europe, Paul Taylor said that "The Insiders is a strong urban action-adventure series."

On 15 November 2007, Jetix Europe announced their Year End results and stated in their report that they were not planning a third season of A.T.O.M., effectively cancelling the series.

== Release ==
=== Broadcast ===
==== France ====
In France, A.T.O.M. first aired on Jetix in 2005.

==== United Kingdom ====
In the United Kingdom, the show premiered on Jetix on August 27, 2005. Jetix Europe promoted the series' UK premiere with a celebrity launch party at the London Trocadero. The show was also promoted with a "Mr. Lee Needs You" school tour that showcased inventing, and a roadshow held at various shopping centres in the country The series later made its terrestrial premiere on GMTV's Toonattik children's block in September 2005, after being pre-sold by the broadcaster in April.

In October 2005, the series became part of the Jetix Max strand alongside Power Rangers and Teenage Mutant Ninja Turtles.

==== United States ====
In the United States, the series debuted on the Jetix block on Toon Disney on January 30, 2006.

=== Home media ===
In the United Kingdom, Volume 1: Feel the Paine was released on DVD on January 23, 2006 (and UMD Video on January 30) by Sanctuary Visual Entertainment, with a second volume titled The Terror Continues planned. However, volume 2 was cancelled for unknown reasons.

In Australia, 7 DVD volumes were released on September 13, 2006 (volumes 1 to 5) and February 5, 2007 (volumes 6 and 7) by MRA Entertainment Group.

In the United States, DVDs of the series have been distributed through Liberation Entertainment. The first two DVD volumes were both released on August 28, 2007, respectively titled "Vol. 1: Touch of Paine" and "Vol. 2: Enter the Dragon".

=== Streaming ===
The first season was previously available to stream on Tubi TV, as well as Amazon Prime via Multicom Entertainment Group just for US Region. Multicom formerly had the full series listed in its distribution catalogue, which was later changed to only one season before being removed entirely.

According to the US Copyright Database, the television series is still a property of Disney's defunct subsidiaries Jetix Europe and SIP Animation, but is not streaming on Disney+.

== Reception ==
In Europe, A.T.O.M. was the second-most popular Jetix original series for third-party sales as of fiscal year 2007, when the second season was delivered. All of the major Jetix Europe originals, including A.T.O.M., ranked "as one of the top two shows in their timeslots in all of the markets in which they aired."

Common Sense Media, in their review of the show said: "The animation here — a blend of classic comic book and anime — is pretty good." and that "because of its relatively high level of cartoon violence [...] A.T.O.M. is best for older grade schoolers." and awarded the series 2 out of 5 stars.

The Brazilian comic book website Universe HQ took notice of the show, due to its depiction of Lioness, who is of Brazilian ancestry.

== Other media ==
=== Toyline ===
Hasbro launched a line of action figures to tie-in with the show, marketed as a reboot of Hasbro's discontinued Action Man toy line. Distinctly different from other Action Man lines, A.T.O.M. figures were the standard size of normal action figures and not of a doll format. Much like Action Man however, these figures are sold individually, usually with figure accessories, from the vehicles distributed to accompany them.

The franchise has vastly similar concepts to the 1980s' M.A.S.K. story line from Kenner (which Hasbro bought in 1991), even down to the code name lettering, as each vehicle for the A.T.O.M. members changes from one ordinary looking terrain vehicle to anything that ranges from a jet car with unfolding door wings, to a bike that soon propels its driver into the air as a helicopter.

In 2007, Hasbro released 12-inch versions of A.T.O.M. action figures, similar to the original Action Man action figures. The toy series was composed mostly of several versions of Axel Manning, the main character, and Paine, Flesh and Tilian as the villains. A plane, a sport car and several minor vehicles were included for this line of A.T.O.M. toys. The line was discontinued shortly thereafter.

=== Comic book ===
Panini Comics published a tie-in comic book series in the United Kingdom from 2006 to 2007. This title replaced their long-running Action Man series, and featured stories by Simon Furman and art by Jack Lawrence.

=== Video game ===
A video game based on the show was released for the PlayStation 2 in 2007, developed by Brain in a Jar and published by Mastertronic Group under their budget game label Blast! Entertainment. It is a racing and action game. Much like the Hasbro toy line and Panini comic book series, the video game was released as Action Man: A.T.O.M., and would be the final video game to be associated with the Action Man franchise.
