= Action Man: 40th Anniversary =

- Box packaging edition
- Type: Action figures
- Invented by: Palitoy
- Company: Hasbro
- Country: United States
- Availability: 2006–2006

The Hasbro Action Man: 40th Anniversary Nostalgic Collection 2006–2010 were reproductions of the early period (1960s to 1970s) Palitoy's Action Man figures, sold in collectors sets released in 2006. Four different boxed uniform sets and a boxed figure were released in each successive wave.

== 40th Anniversary reproductions; 2006–2010 ==
In 2006, Hasbro authorised the reproduction of the original 60s-70s Action Man under the "Nostalgic Collection" banner. In a departure from normal retailing, the sets were not sold through general release; there was only one authorised retail agent in the UK, and one in the U.S.

The driving force behind the development of the 40th anniversary line was Alan Hall, the writer of three Action Man collector's guides. In sum, a wide range of figures and outfit sets were produced in a format identical to the original, the retail packaging in a manner similar to the G.I. Joe 40th Anniversary reproductions of 2003-2005. The figure is a mostly faithful reproduction of the Palitoy original, with the exception of the feet, which are the larger GI Joe variety. The body is held together in the same manner as the original, with rivets, wire hooks and elastic, with the precise details slightly varied. The figure is available in permutations of painted head/hard hand, flocked hair/hard hand, flocked hair/flex hand, flocked hair/eagle eyes/flex hand depending on the set.

The clothing and accessory items are all faithful reproductions of the original Palitoy items, down to the feel of the fabric used and the vinyl/plastics of most components; the boots are a flexible vinyl, in comparison with the hard plastic used for the GI Joe 40th reproduction boots. With the exception of the 1st issue releases, the clothing does not have the Palitoy tag.

== Packaging ==
The first releases of the line were identical copies of the original Palitoy Action Man products, including all copyright and country of origin markings, but this was a copyright issue, and some packs had decals applied over. The newer releases all state "Hasbro © 2006 Used with permission reproduction pack". "Palitoy Regd" was also dropped from all Action Man logo graphics, as this was also identical to the original issue. The large outer packaging has come in two variants to date; one with a large Union Jack background, the other with the wood grain typically associated with 60s Action Man and GI Joe.

== Figures ==
The various waves are interspersed with reproduction figures of all the 60s-80s Action Man variants; painted head/hard hand, flocked hair/hard hand, flocked hair/flex hands, Eagle Eyes/Flocked Hair/flex hands, and the reproduction of the revised Action Man "blue pants" body that was released in 1979.

== Uniform sets ==
As with G.I. Joe's 40th anniversary releases, the sets were released in "waves" of 4, with 12 wave releases in total.

- Wave 1 consisted of Tank Commander, Chelsea Footballer, Frogman and Life Guards, each with the appropriate basic boxed Action Man.
- Wave 2 covered the Argyll and Sutherland Highlander, Cricketeer, Deep Sea Diver and Green Beret outfits.
- Wave 3 covered the French Foreign Legion, German Stromtrooper, Mountaineer and Royal Horse Guards (Blues) outfits.
- Wave 4 covered the Army Medic (US), 17th/21st Lancer, Astronaut (US), and British Parachute Regiment outfits.
- Wave 5 covered the Australian Jungle Fighter, Manchester United Footballer, Olympic Champion and Royal Marine Combat outfits.
- Wave 6 covered Adventurer's Base Camp, British InfantryMan, Polar Explorer and Soccer Player outfits.
- Wave 7: Boxed Soldier, Combat Field Jacket + accessories; Boxed Commander, Ski Patrol + accessories; Boxed Sportsman, Liverpool footballer outfit + accessories; Boxed Commander, British Officer outfit + accessories.
- Wave 8: Boxed Escape From Colditz set; Dog Sledge set; Boxed Sailor, British MP outfit + accessories; Boxed Soldier, German Camp Kommandant.
- Wave 9: Boxed soldier, Heavy Weapons Set; Explorer River Craft set; Boxed Sportsman, West Ham footballer outfit + accessories, 80's Boxed Soldier, Afrika Corp outfit + accessories; Boxed Commander, Royal Marines outfit + accessories
- Wave 10: Boxed Commander, Red Devil Parachutist + accessories; Boxed Soldier, Russian Infantry + accessories; Boxed Pilot, Battle of Britain Pilot, SAS boxed figure, SAS Parachute Attack set
- Wave 11: Boxed Commander, Jungle Explorer outfit + accessories; Boxed Sailor, Navy attack accessory sets; Boxed Sportsman, Tottenham Hotspur Footballer outfit + accessories; Boxed Desert Fighter, Long Range Desert Recon outfit + accessories
- Wave 12: Boxed Commander, Judo outfit + accessories; Boxed Soldier, French Resistance Fighter + accessories; Boxed Cowboy, US Cavalry outfit + accessories; Boxed Native American, Royal Hussar outfit + accessories

Additional items included faithful reproductions of the Action Man Horse, Ceremonial tack set, Bulldog and the "Escape From Colditz" boxed uniform set. The latter was released around the same time as the Parker Brothers board game of the same name.

== See also ==
- Action Man: 1993-2006
- Action Man
- G.I. Joe
- Geyperman

== Bibliography ==
- Leicestershire County Council
- United States Patent and Trademark Office
- Michlig, J. (1998) "G.I. Joe; The Complete Story of America's Favorite Man of Action" (ISBN 0-8118-1822-5)
- Baird, F. (1993) "Action Man - The Gold Medal Doll for Boys 1966-1984" (ISBN 1-872727-36-0)
- Hall, A. (1998) "Action Man - the ultimate collectors guide" Vol.1 (ISBN 1-901706-141)
- Hall, A. (1999) "Action Man - the ultimate collectors guide" Vol.2 (ISBN 1-901706-29X)
- King, K. (2000) "Action Man - the real story 1966-1996" (ISBN 0-9538870-0-6)
- Le Vexier, E.; Gavigniaux, H. trans. (2004) "Action Joe - The Story of the French GI Joe" ISBN 2-915239-21-5
