= Action Man (1995 TV series) =

- Title card
- Genre: Superhero
- Created by: DIC Productions; Bohbot Entertainment
- Based on: Action Man; by Hasbro
- Developed by: Bob Forward; Phil Harnage
- Written by: Julie Fuller and Diane Fresco (live action segments)
- Directed by: Jeff Pruitt (live action); Chris Bartleman (cartoon)
- Creative directors: Jeff Pruitt; Chris Bartleman
- Voices of: Mark Griffin; Rolf Leenders; Joely Collins; Dale Wilson; Iris Quinn; Richard Cox; David Hay; Garry Chalk
- Composer: Stephen C. Marston
- Country of origin: United States
- Original language: English
- No. of seasons: 1
- No. of episodes: 26

Production
- Executive producers: Andy Heyward; Brad Kreisberg; Robby London; Michael Maliani
- Producers: Kyle Solorio; Jim Weathers
- Cinematography: Nick Woolfolk
- Editor: Miriam L. Preissel
- Running time: 30 minutes
- Production companies: DIC Productions, L.P.; Bohbot Entertainment

Original release
- Network: Syndication
- Release: 23 September 1995 – 30 March 1996

Related
- Action Man (2000 TV series)

Action Man is an American children's animated/live-action television series, created by DIC Productions, L.P. and Bohbot Entertainment. The cartoon is based on the Hasbro toy line of the same name. The show also featured live action segments before and after the main show, which were filmed at Universal Studios Hollywood and Florida.

== Setting ==
Set in a fictional version of the post-Cold War world where the United Nations has been replaced by the World Security Council after the dissolution of the Soviet Union from which was followed then by the rapid decline of the already known political tensions between some nations and conflicts being waged around the world, leading to the rise of a steady peace in their place. However, what seems to be considered the build-up to world peace, that is slowly happening, is constantly threatened by an international paramilitary terrorist organisation since its emergence. The organisation is staffed by mercenary soldiers called "Skullmen", whose loyalty is to their leader, an evil mastermind who operates under the mysterious phantom identity of Doctor X. Doctor X is determined to achieve his ultimate goal of conquering the world and ruling it with an iron fist, but the only thing that's stopping him and his army of Skullmen from achieving world domination is the Action Team, an elite multinational military task force created by the leader of the World Security Council, Secretary General Norris, that is tasked with stopping all schemes overseen by Doctor X and have the responsibility of capturing him.

== Premise ==
The series revolves around the title character Action Man, a British national and the field leader of an elite multinational military task force called "The Action Team", who fight against the evil terrorist Dr. X and his army of Skullmen, an organisation whose goal is world domination. Before joining the Action Team, Action Man was already an enemy of Dr. X and had been pursuing his own personal mission of thwarting Dr. X's operations and trying to capture him, all while doing so without being affiliated with any law enforcement agencies or military forces. In his last mission of his solo career, Action Man fought Dr. X at a chalet in Switzerland while also crossing paths with his then future team-mates of Action Team: Natalie, Knuck and Jacques. The battle resulted in the building being set on fire, Dr. X escaping and Action Man being rescued along with Jacques by Natalie and Knuck before the chalet exploded. However Dr. X was able to shoot a brain wipe serum that made contact with Action Man's skin which caused him to have amnesia. Because his team-mates only heard Dr. X address him as "Action Man" on that night they first saw him it became his name from then on. Since then, Action Man tries to follow every lead he can to piece together the clues and recover his forgotten past whenever a random memory of his returns, all while he and Action Team stop Dr. X and his organisation from conquering the world.

Action Team are based on an orbiting space station called Space Station Extreme where travelling to and from it is by their high tech aircraft Jet Extreme, which they also use to travel to any part of the world where they are needed.

Each time a forgotten memory returns to Action Man he'll go to a secret base called "Base Paradise", which is hidden underground on an uninhabited island, where inside there is a machine that Action Man uses to undergo a virtual memory scan in which he enters a virtual simulated mindscape where he views the memory in vivid detail. The machine operates with an artificial intelligence named Vira, whose role is that of an assistant in the mindscape that provides Action Man with information and insight on unlocked memories when he's exploring them. To enter the mindscape, Action Man must wear a virtual reality suit and headset and stand inside a chamber that is a part of the machine, once inside he then gives Vira the verbal command to activate the virtual memory scan.

Action Man is a member of an elite multinational task force named the Action Team (not Action Force) who fight against the terrorist Dr. X and his evil organisation that is not called the "Council of Doom" in the TV series.

== Cast ==
- Mark Griffin as Action Man / Matthew Exler
- Rolf Leenders as Doctor X / Dorian Exler
- Joely Collins as Natalie Poole
- Dale Wilson as Knuck Williams
- Iris Quinn as Vira
- Richard Cox as Jacques
- David Hay as Professor Gangrene
- Garry Chalk as Secretary Norris

=== Additional cast ===
- Nigel Bennett
- Lisa Bunting
- Christopher Gaze
- Chris Humphreys
- David Morse
- Colin Murdock
- Rick Poltaruk
- Simon Pidgeon
- William Samples
- Devon Sawa
- Paulina Gillis
- Andrew Francis
- Mark Hildreth
- Peter Kelamis
- Michael Dobson
- Tracey-Lee Smyth
- Ingrid Tesch

== Episodes ==
No.	Title	Written by	Original release date
1	"Explosive Situation"	Bob Forward	23 September 1995
Dr. X orchestrates the explosion of a plane to steal a nuclear warhead. With a nuclear battleship about to fall in Dr. X's hands, Action Man makes haste to recover the warhead, aided by his team and Dr. X's former lackey Ursula. Live action mission: Cut off Dr. X's fuel supply in the North Sea. Team mate on radio: Action 2 (Knuck) Action Man's end-of-episode lesson: Making mistakes
2	"Fountain of Youth"	Phil Harnage	30 September 1995
Dr. X captures the Fargo scientists to get hold of the regenerative Extract Herb to gain a fortune out of youth serum. Action Man liberates the scientists, but Dr. X has destroyed all their research. Live action mission: Invade Doctor X's headquarters in New York, USA. Team mate on radio: Action 3 (Natalie) Action Man's end-of-episode lesson: Recycling
3	"Cybersoldier"	Bob Forward	7 October 1995
Dr. X steals an experimental KGB cybernetic android. Disguising himself as an old friend of Action Man the android shoots Action Man who lands in the river and Dr. X believes he is dead. He also leaves Knuck and Natalie injured (Knuck with an injury to his right hand and Natalie with an injury to her right leg). Unknown to them Action Man is still alive and thinking that Dr. X believes he is dead decides to use it to his advantage in order to beat Dr. X at his game at the robotics factory. Live action mission: Contain radioactive waste in Madagascar. Team mate on radio: Action 2 (Knuck) Action Man's end-of-episode lesson: Exercising
4	"You Can't Go Home Again"	Greg Johnson	14 October 1995
Natalie helps Action Man recall some of his past memories, but realise they had followed a false trail to Haven Mount village that Dr. X is holding captive to ensure the destruction of the Xtreme Station. Action Man is able to destroy Dr. X's plasma cannon and save Haven Mount. Live action mission: Disable megamind computer in Sri Lanka. Team mate on radio: Action Command (Secretary Norris) Action Man's end-of-episode lesson: Imagination
5	"Ancient History"	Brooks Wachtel	21 October 1995
Dr. X has stolen a tunneling machine and kidnapped a team of miners for an excavation which to Natalie's horror is being led by her uncle Ian, under blackmail from Dr. X. Thanks to Ian's mine planted on Dr. X's snowcruiser, Action Man manages to destroy Dr. X's acquired lethal PAX 39 gas canisters. Live action mission: Destroy weapons factory in Alice Springs, Australia. Team mate on radio: Action 2 (Knuck) Action Man's end-of-episode lesson: Riding a bike
6	"The Red Plague"	Bob Forward	28 October 1995
Dr. X has taken a beaker of deadly Red Plague virus and kidnapped Dr. Pandemo who developed the cure. Action Man is lured to Dr. X's underground lab so Dr. X can steal the Jet Xtreme. Action Man liberates the jet and scientist and vanquishes the Red Plague virus for good, but Norris, Knuck and Natalie are infected with the plague so it's all down to Action Man to save their lives. Live action mission: Cut off Dr. X's arms supply in Edinburgh, Scotland. Team mate on radio: Action 2 (Knuck) Action Man's end-of-episode lesson: Appearance
7	"Peril at Perigee"	Mike Medlock	4 November 1995
Dr. X has hijacked a stealth bomber. Dr. X takes the bomber's weapons to launch from the European Space Agency base. Dr. X takes Jacque as hostage, but Jacques turns the tables on Dr. X and puts his satellite out of operation. Live action mission: Liberate quark plate in Cayman Islands. Team mate on radio: Action 4 (Jacques) Action Man's end-of-episode lesson: Don't use drugs
8	"Rogue Moons"	Jeff Kwitny	11 November 1995
Dr. X has a rogue moon launcher set to destroy Earth's cities. After Action Man braves the Gobi Desert hazards, Jacques seeds some precipitation to wash out Dr. X's camouflaged gun bunker and destroy the launcher. Live action mission: Intercept arms shipment in Morocco, North Africa. Team mate on radio: Action 3 (Natalie) Action Man's end-of-episode lesson: Swimming in the sea
9	"Hands Down"	Gildart Jackson	18 November 1995
Dr. X kidnaps the American ambassador to brainwash him in order to set up the Action Team. While Knuck and Natalie end up being arrested Action Man goes vigilante to root out Dr. X and clear the Action Team's name. Live action mission: Secure village dam in La Paz, Bolivia. Team mate on radio: Action 4 (Jacques) Action Man's end-of-episode lesson: Disabilities
10	"We Come in Peace"	Jules Dennis	25 November 1995
Dr. X has stolen an anti-gravity device to stage an alien attack on Earth. With the aid of the scientist Professor Mackenzie who invented the device, Action Man destroys the fake alien spaceship while Natalie distracts Dr. X and his Skullmen. Live action mission: Disable sub station in New Orleans, USA. Team mate on radio: Action 4 (Jacques) Action Man's end-of-episode lesson: Recycling
11	"R.A.I.D."	Reed Shelly and Bruce Shelly	2 December 1995
With his Catalyst Crystal plot thwarted, Dr. X sends a dog (which Jacque adopts under the name Raid) to attack Action Man. Jacque uses Raid to track down Dr. X and terminate his Catalyst Crystal missiles. Live action mission: Stop Dr. X's signal in Boston, USA. Team mate on radio: Action 3 (Natalie) Action Man's end-of-episode lesson: Follow instructions
12	"Skynap"	Reed Shelly and Bruce Shelly	9 December 1995
Dr. X steals Jet Xtreme and kidnaps Secretary Norris and takes over the Action Space Station to start a major war around the world. Operating from base paradise and using his VR Suit, Action Man hacks into the Space Station to drive Dr. X out. Live action mission: Secure experimental serum in Barcelona, Spain. Team mate on radio: Action 2 (Knuck) Action Man's end-of-episode lesson: Riding a bike
13	"The Outside Edge"	Jess Winfield	16 December 1995
Dr. X and his infiltrator Domichi frame Secretary Norris of corruption and disband the Action Team. The Action Team liberate their equipment and Norris and thwart Dr. X's next shipment theft, thus clearing their names. Live action mission: Destroy weapons stockpile in Los Angeles, USA. Team mate on radio: Action 2 (Knuck) Action Man's end-of-episode lesson: Using the internet
14	"The X Factor"	Phil Harnage	6 January 1996
Action Man helps Knuck investigate his nephew Tom who has been involved in Gangrene's X-Vitamin steroid tests. Action Man tricks Dr. X into destroying Gangrene's lab and prevents him from putting the X-Vitamin into the city's water supply. Live action mission: Disrupt blockage in Lake Ontario, Canada. Team mate on radio: Action 3 (Natalie) Action Man's end-of-episode lesson: Drugs
15	"Ice Age"	Diane Fresco	13 January 1996
Dr. X steals a Neutron Phalanx Gun and a large amount of Plutonium to destroy the world of its oceans. Action Man recovers the Neutron Phalanx, while Kunck defuses the Plutonium bombs. Live action mission: Disable and destroy Dr. X's new base in the Greek Islands. Team mate on radio: Action 3 (Natalie) Action Man's end-of-episode lesson: Going outside in the sun
16	"Soul of Evil"	Kim Rawl	20 January 1996
Soon after winning a martial arts match, Ursula arrives begging for Action Man to help as she claims that Dr. X is trying to terminate her. He later encounters an assassin named Gem Eye who shares exactly the same voice as Action Man alongside the same "AM" tattoo, but after getting confused Natalie shoots at the wrong person allowing Gem Eye to escape. Learning they both have the same "AM" tattoo, Action Man is led to believe that he and Gem Eye are both members of an assassin cult called the "Acolytes of Mayhem". Live action mission: Detonate and destroy toxic dump in Alaska, USA. Team mate on radio: Action Command (Secretary Norris) Action Man's end-of-episode lesson: Recycling
17	"Deja Vu"	Mike O'Mahony	27 January 1996
While Dr. X attempts to abduct the G7 leaders, Action Man is constantly troubled by how familiar Dr. X's plan feels. A memory flash reveals that it was Action Man himself that came up with the plan in the first place. Live action mission: Escape prison and expose Dr. X's strategies in Hawaii, USA. Team mate on radio: Action 3 (Natalie) Action Man's end-of-episode lesson: Smoking
18	"Satellite Down"	Mike Medlock	3 February 1996
A satellite containing important security codes for the World Security Council goes down in a hidden civilization nestled somewhere in the Antarctic. Live action mission: Disable warhead in Moscow, Russia. Team mate on radio: Action Command (Secretary Norris) Action Man's end-of-episode lesson: What to do for emergencies
19	"Space Walk"	Phil Harnage	10 February 1996
Dr. X takes control of a fully automated private space shuttle carrying two of the world's richest men. Live action mission: Secure armory in Cherbourge, France. Team mate on radio: Action Command (Secretary Norris) Action Man's end-of-episode lesson: Riding a bike
20	"The Most Dangerous Prey"	Bob Forward	17 February 1996
The Action Team head to Australia to free a group of locals being forced by Dr. X to mine uranium, but Jet Extreme is shot down soon afterwards by Dr. X's Overseer robot. Stranded with no working equipment, Action Man and his friends must survive as Dr. X and the Overseer hunt them down. Surviving however will prove to be tough for the team as during the crash Jacques wheelchair is destroyed, Knuck has a fractured ankle and Natalie has a broken arm. Live action mission: Secure top secret files in Palermo, Sicily. Team mate on radio: Action Command (Secretary Norris) Action Man's end-of-episode lesson: Animals in cars
21	"Points of Danger"	Wendy Reardon	24 February 1996
Action Man and his team must protect a special fish called the "Puppet Quill" that can emit a special gas. Dr. X needs the fish to create a mind control gas which he plans to use on the world's leaders. Live action mission: Retrieve detonators in Marseilles, France. Team mate on radio: Action 3 (Natalie) Action Man's end-of-episode lesson: Poisonous plants
22	"Crack of Doom"	Wendy Reardon	2 March 1996
The people of Vulcana Island live in isolation from the rest of the world, but Dr. X earns the locals' trust after saving their island from a volcanic eruption, and manages to make the Action Team and the World Security Council look bad in the process. Live action mission: "Operation Freebird" escape prison and silence alarm in Vienna, Austria. Team mate on radio: Action 4 (Jacques) Action Man's end-of-episode lesson: Rainforests
23	"Space Wars"	Jess Winfield	9 March 1996
Dr. X sends a diversionary attack to Brussels to keep the Action Team busy while he steals and arms a space shuttle from Cape Canaveral. His goal is to take over an abandoned but still armed space station. Live action mission: "Operation Lock and Key" destroy Doctor X's warehouse in Birmingham, England. Team mate on radio: Action 2 (Knuck) Action Man's end-of-episode lesson: Playing loud music
24	"Past Performance"	Greg Johnson	16 March 1996
Dr. X breaks into a top secret facility in Switzerland with intentions to steal a decryption computer with intentions to steal secret codes and launch a missile in a bid to destroy select points across the Earth. It is therefore down to Action Man and his team to stop Dr. X and his scheme, but for Action Man Ursula is once again involved. Live action mission: Disable auto chopper in Crete, The Mediterranean. Team mate on radio: Action 2 (Knuck) Action Man's end-of-episode lesson: Taking care of pets
25	"A Time for Action: Part 1"	Bob Forward	23 March 1996
Jacques is invited to join his family for the holidays, but a sargovian gold shipment is underway which Dr. X wants to get his hands on which as a result interrupts these plans. Despite managing to take out Dr. X's skullmen fighter jets one manages to infiltrate the plane which unknown to Action Man and Natalie turns out to be a robot which succeeds in stealing the gold and then blowing up the plane. Live action mission: "Operation Homing Pigeon" rescue captured witness inside warehouse and escape. Team mate on radio: Action 2 (Knuck) Action Man's end-of-episode lesson: Reading
26	"A Time for Action: Part 2"	Bob Forward	30 March 1996
After escaping from the destroyed plane before Jacques can land and pick up Action Man and Natalie he discovers his father has been captured and being held as prisoner alongside Secretary Norris at the embassy. Not wishing for his father to be harmed he is therefore forced to abandon Action Man and Natalie and proceed to where they are located, while Dr. X is hoping to acquire Jet Extreme and the wealth of the world. Unknown to Dr. X however who wanted to let Action Man and Natalie freeze to death Knuck drops a package for the duo and together they manage to access and hijack the black shark. Live action mission: Destroy chiller machine in the Bahamas. Team mate on radio: Action Command (Secretary Norris) Action Man's end-of-episode lesson: Clean up after yourself

== Toys ==
The show introduced several new teammates for Action Man which were then made into toys. The action figures of Natalie Poole and Knuck have become very rare collector's items. At Joecon 2010, a convention exclusive Q-Force action figure of Natalie Poole was released.

== Media releases ==
=== United States ===
In November 2001, Lions Gate Home Entertainment and Trimark Home Video released two VHS tapes titled "Secret of Action Man" and "Action Man in Space", containing two episodes each. A DVD also titled Action Man in Space was also released, containing the same four episodes as the VHS tapes. None of these DVDs contain the live-action segments.

Release name	Episodes	Release date	Running time	Additional information
Action Man in Space (VHS)	"Space Walk" "Peril at Perigee"	November 5, 2001		
Secret of Action Man (VHS)	"Space Wars" "Skynap"	November 5, 2001		
Secret of Action Man (DVD)	"Space Walk" "Peril at Perigee" "Space Wars" "Skynap"	November 5, 2001	60 Minutes	

In 2003, Sterling Entertainment released a DVD called "Space Wars". It was re-released by NCircle Entertainment in 2007. As with the Lions Gate releases, this DVD doesn't feature the live-action segments either.

Release name	Episodes	Release date	Running time	Additional information
Action Man: Space Wars	"We Come in Peace" "Satellite Down" "Skynap" "Space Wars"	2003		

In February 2015, Mill Creek Entertainment released Action Man - The Complete Series on DVD in Region 1 as part of their "Retro TV Toons" series. This marked the first time all episodes of the show had received a DVD release.

=== United Kingdom ===
In the United Kingdom, the series was released on VHS by Abbey Home Entertainment/PolyGram and later Just Entertainment and Abbey Home Media.

The episodes were also released on DVD by Abbey Home Media, with two releases from Prism Leisure, but the episodes on the DVDs are in a random order, and many episodes have been released numerous times while several have not been released at all. This has caused confusion amongst many fans.

==== VHS ====
VHS name	Episodes	Release date	Running time	Additional information
Vol. 1 - Explosive Situation	"Explosive Situation" "Fountain of Youth"	September 23, 1996	42 minutes	
Vol. 2 - X-treme Action	"Ancient History" "Paril at Perigee"	September 23, 1996	42 minutes	
Vol. 3 - R.A.I.D.	"R.A.I.D." "The X-Factor"	November 4, 1996	42 minutes	
Vol. 4 - We Come in Peace	"We Come in Peace" "Hands Down"	November 4, 1996	42 minutes	
Satellite Down	"Satellite Down" "Ice Age"	February 10, 1997	42 minutes	
A Time for Action	"A Time for Action" (combined) "Points of Danger"	1997	42 minutes	
Explosive Situation	"Explosive Situation" "Fountain of Youth" "CyberSoldier"	2001	64 minutes	
Explosive Situation	"Explosive Situation" "Fountain of Youth"	April 22, 2002	42 Minutes	
CyberSoldier	"CyberSoldier" "Hands Down"	Mid-2002	42 Minutes	
The X Factor	"The X Factor" "R.A.I.D."	Mid-2002	42 Minutes	
Space Wars	"Space Wars" "Satellite Down" "Hands Down"	June 17, 2002	63 minutes	
Rogue Moons	"Rogue Moons" "Points of Danger" "Deja Vu"	September 9, 2002	63 minutes	
The Outside Edge	"The Outside Edge" "Skynap" "Crack of Doom"	May 24, 2004	63 minutes	
Past Performance	"Soul of Evil" "We Came in Peace" "Past Performance"	May 24, 2004	63 minutes	

==== DVD ====
DVD name	Episodes	Release date	Running time	Additional information
Explosive Situation	"Explosive Situation" "Fountain of Youth" "CyberSoldier"	November 11, 2002	63 minutes	
3 Explosive Episodes	"Ice Age" "Skynap" "Crack of Doom"	May 7, 2003	66 minutes	
A Time for Action	"A Time For Action" (both parts combined) "The Most Dangerous Prey"	2003	63 minutes	
The Outside Edge	"The Outside Edge" "Skynap" "Crack of Doom"	May 24, 2004	65 minutes	
Past Performance	"Soul of Evil" "We Came in Peace" "Past Performance"	May 24, 2004	63 minutes	
Peril at Perigee	"Peril at Perigee" "You Can't Go Home Again"	January 24, 2005	43 minutes	
3 Explosive Episodes	"The Red Plague" "Points of View" "Ancient History"	April 25, 2005	63 minutes	
Rogue Moons	"Rogue Moons" "Points of Danger" "Deja Vu"	August 7, 2006	63 minutes	

=== Other countries ===
In France, Spain and The Netherlands, VHS tapes of the series were released by Buena Vista Home Entertainment, once again usually containing two episodes.
