= Action Man: Search for Base X =

2001 video game

- Developer(s): Natsume Co., Ltd.
- Publisher(s): THQ
- Director(s): Shinji Kyogoku
- Producer(s): Iku Mizutani
- Programmer(s): Daisuke Tanabe; Koji Kadosaka
- Artist(s): Shinji Kyogoku; Sousuke Yamazaki; Tomoki Hamuro
- Composer(s): Iku Mizutani
- Platform(s): Game Boy Color
- Release: NA: January 30, 2001; EU: March 9, 2001
- Genre(s): Action
- Mode(s): Single-player

Action Man: Search for Base X is an action video game developed by Natsume Co., Ltd. and published by THQ under license from Hasbro Interactive for the Game Boy Color. It was released in North America on January 30, 2001, and is based on the Action Man TV series.

== Gameplay ==
The player's character, Alex "Action" Mann, plays in a snow level wearing a parka.

The game's plot centers around the protagonist Alex "Action" Mann, and his mission to stop the evil Dr. X from releasing a weapon of mass destruction. Action Man must find Dr. X's base by playing through levels in various locales. The player is given a variety of suits for Action Man to wear in different situations, including a parka, a wet suit, and a space suit. Each level can be completed multiple times in order to achieve different goals; the correct suit and items are not required on the first completion of a level, but later attempts require specific suits and items to bypass obstacles. By wearing different suits and using specified items, alternate paths in levels can be discovered.

The gameplay is similar to other 16-bit era action video games. The game contains fifteen missions for the player to complete spread through six main areas. The player is allowed to choose two weapons to bring into battle with them, such as a crossbow and a pistol. The game allows the player to jump, run, swim, and climb through various areas of the game, allowing for a more varied experience.

== History ==
In October 2000, THQ secured a license from Hasbro Interactive to release Action Man: Search For Base X in 2000.

Action Man: Search for Base X received above average reviews from critics, who felt that the game was difficult but fun nonetheless; the game has received a compilation score of 68.22% from GameRankings. GameSpot's Frank Provo praised the game's color palette and sound design, but noted the game was a bit too difficult. He was surprised that the game was even developed so late in the Game Boy Color's life cycle. IGN's Marc Nix criticized the game for being unfairly difficult, and compared it negatively to the Mega Man video game series. He blamed bad in-game controls for the difficulty of the game.
