= Action Force =

Action figure series

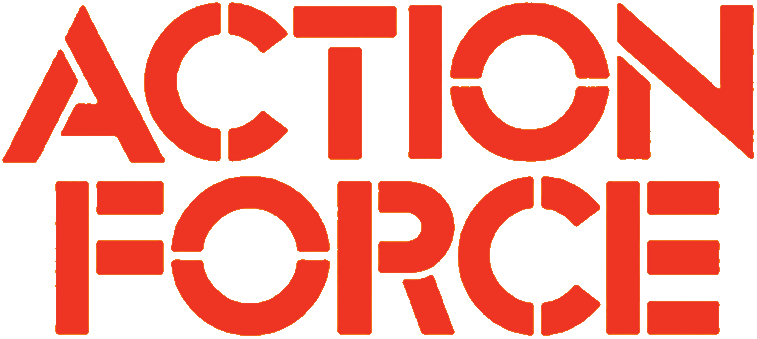
- Product type: Action figure
- Current owner: Hasbro (1985–present)
- Country: United Kingdom
- Introduced: 1982; 44 years ago
- Related brands: Action Man
- Previous owners: Palitoy (1982–85)

Action Force is a brand of European action figures released in the 1980s that was based on the Action Man toyline. It was also used to introduce G.I. Joe: A Real American Hero toys to European markets. Several publishing companies have produced comic books based on the figures.

== History ==
=== First generation (1982) ===
The Action Force figures were first produced in 1982 by Palitoy Limited, and were released in two waves. They were created in response to the falling sales of the company's larger collection, Action Man, and the comparative success of the smaller Kenner Star Wars action figures, which the company was licensed to sell in Europe.

The figures are a mixture of historical military figures (e.g. Desert Rat, German Storm trooper) and of more contemporary soldiers (e.g. Arctic and Naval Assault). In contrast to the American-centric G.I. Joe figures, the Action Force figures were a mixture of international figures, including British, German, Australian and American soldiers. However, unlike later releases, the first figures were not accompanied by file cards giving backstories, nor were they featured in comic books other than a series of mini-comics that were packaged with some of the vehicles, notably the AF-3 and AF-5.

Figures

- Arctic Assault
- Australian Jungle Fighter
- British 2 Para
- British Commando
- British Royal Marine
- Commander (available by mail in offer only)
- Deep Sea Diver
- Desert Rat
- Frogman
- German Stormtrooper
- Ground Assault
- Helicopter Pilot
- Mission Pilot
- Mountain & Arctic
- Naval Assault
- Night Patrol
- S.A.S Frogman
- S.A.S Trooper
- US Paratrooper

Vehicles

- Action Force Base (a cardboard headquarters with zip-line feature)
- AF-3 (a Jeep-style patrol vehicle)
- AF-5 Multi-Mission Vehicle (a wheeled patrol vehicle with extendable wings for flight and a detachable flotation collar for amphibious use)
- AF-7 Deep Sea Diver Platform
- AF-9 Mountain & Arctic (a snowmobile-style vehicle)

=== Second generation (1983) ===
Following the success of the first range of figures, a second and larger group of figures was launched in 1983. Action Force sales accounted to about one million over six months in 1983, and the offering was expanded to include a new wave of figures and vehicles that were released in 1984. Palitoy took a different approach with this second range of figures by grouping the allied action figures and enemies each with accompanying weaponry and vehicles. The figures were given comic book identities and were featured in a new range of stories in the Battle Action Force comic. The toys were also supplied with file cards that provided a brief profile of the characters. For key figures, these profiles were expanded in the Battle Action Force comic with their own multi-issue storylines (e.g. The Black Major).

- Z Force: an allied infantry and artillery-based unit.
- SAS Force: an allied special operations team.
- Q Force: an allied ocean-based team.
- Space Force: an allied space operations team.
- Red Shadows: the unified enemy force, led by Baron Ironblood.

The fifth team was to have been characterized as a 'special weapons' unit, initially believed to be called 'F-Force'. Later research revealed a pair of photographs from a toy catalog which showed the figures in different color schemes, along with vehicles featuring an 'SWS' logo instead. The catalog photographs also showed US G.I. Joe vehicles, which were released as part of the SAS Force and Z Force groups. These vehicles included a white and grey Jeep, a white artillery piece and a white missile battery.

Both the action figures and the vehicles borrowed elements from the first generation models and the new casts licensed from the G. I. Joe toyline from Hasbro. There was also an Action Force fan club promoted both on the figures' packaging and in the Battle Action Force comic book. In 1984, additional figures and vehicles were cast, borrowing heavily from the G.I. Joe and Cobra ranges. During this time, the Action Force toyline branched out into video games, audio stories on cassette tapes, stationery, and toiletries.

=== Third generation (1985) ===
In 1985, Palitoy ceded control of the European market to Hasbro following the death of Alfred Pallett, one of Palitoy's owners, and the winding up of operations at their Leicester factory. Hasbro purchased the Palitoy factory, copyrights, and moulds and began to package G.I. Joe figures under the Action Force brand. In characterization terms, this move marked the end of the subgrouping of the Action Force team, and a new unified Action Force (or AF) also faced a new enemy in the name of Cobra.

The 1985 range were composed mostly from the 1983/84 US GI Joe range which included Swivel Arm reissues of the 1982 figures with some vehicles carried over from the 1983-84 Action Force range two of which Sealion and the Triad Fighter were re-released but Dolphin and Moondancer who as a result of the change to repackaged GI Joe became repainted versions of the GI Joe figures Zap and Short-Fuze.

The parallel comic book storylines also maintained continuity with a number of plot lines that blended elements of the second range of figures with the third, featuring the new characters as an international elite anti-terrorist unit of a wider Action Force. The Force was still backed up by the Z Force, SAS, other units fighting Cobra, the Red Shadows and even a re-animated Adolf Hitler and the Nazis (despite being ostensibly set in the present day). The characters created by Battle Action Force were altered in the European market to have mixed nationalities in contrast to the US-centric G.I. Joe characters. Over time, however, the range evolved into an unreconstructed G.I. Joe force and its enemy Cobra.

The G.I. Joe animated series was re-titled and re-dubbed for release in the UK. Any mention of G.I. Joe was replaced with Action Force, however, the G.I. Joe logo remained on vehicles and equipment shown in the cartoon.

== Comics ==
=== Battle Action Force tie-in ===
In July 1983, the Action Force characters initially guest-featured in a comic strip serial in Battle. The strip proved to be so popular that a further five promotional mini-comics were included free with every IPC publication in the weeks to follow. On 8 October 1983, Action Force joined the pages of Battle full-time and the magazine was retitled Battle Action Force. The comic took on the role of providing backstories and storylines for the action figures. Following the closure of Palitoy in 1986 and Hasbro acquiring the various intellectual property rights to the Action Force toyline, the Action Force strip was canceled. The Battle Action Force magazine was subsequently merged with Eagle.

=== Marvel UK's Action Force comic ===
Following the demise of the Battle Action Force strips, a weekly Action Force comic was launched by Marvel UK on 8 March 1987, consisting of reprints of the US G.I. Joe comic book and new UK-exclusive short strips. The G.I. Joe comics were adjusted to fit into the UK strip's continuity and had all references to G.I. Joe replaced with Action Force, and the UK-exclusive strips maintained a separate continuity from the US G.I. Joe comic. The Action Force comic was canceled in 1988 after fifty issues due to low sales and was replaced with Action Force Monthly, which was itself canceled after fifteen issues. The Action Force Monthly title printed new stories as well as reprinting stories from the weekly title. The magazine was released in the US under the title G.I. Joe – European Missions.

In late 1989, the G.I. Joe story reprints were continued in the UK Transformers comic under the name G.I. Joe the Action Force to conform to the toyline. The reprints changed back to G.I. Joe until they were dropped in 1991. In 1995, Panini Comics obtained the Marvel UK licence and began publishing an Action Man comic the following year without reference to Action Force or G.I. Joe.

=== Devil's Due revival ===
In 2005 and 2007, the Action Force characters were partially revived. The Red Shadows organization was featured in the two-part Dawn of the Red Shadows storyline in G.I. Joe: A Real American Hero (vol. 2) #42 and #43, following a series of mysterious attacks against both G.I. Joe and Cobra. This Red Shadows organization was led by Wilder Vaughn, a British military officer gone rogue, and viewed organized governments as corrupt and in need of removal. After this appearance, where they caused substantial damage, they have not seen again; Vaughn made a cameo in the Black Major uniform in a later storyline, stating Cobra had decimated the organization off-panel.

The Action Force characters Quarrel, Moondancer, Hunter and Blades made cameo appearances in G.I. Joe: America's Elite issue #30 as representatives of NATO.

== Action Force in Germany ==
The second-generation Action Force figures were also released in West Germany during the 1980s, albeit without the benefit of a comic book tie-in. The German toys went under the title of Action Force and fought the "Terror-Bande" (roughly translated as "Terror Gang"). The German release consisted only of the first wave of second-generation figures and characters (some 30 figures and vehicles), however, the characters and vehicles were still grouped in their subunits: anti-terror team (or ATT) corresponding to Z-Force; the special anti-terror team (or SATT) corresponding to SAS Force; the deep-sea anti-terror team (or TSATT) corresponding to Q Force; and the space anti-terror team (or WATT) corresponding to Space Force.

Distributors, still concerned by Germany's actions during World War II, modified certain aspects of the Action Force range to appear less violent. According to researchers of the German Palitoy range, most of the guns supplied with the figures were replaced by "less violent" stun-weapons, laser-weapons or knives. Also, the human skull on the Red Shadow (or Terror-Bande) figures was removed from the toyline.

== 2009 and 2010 G.I. Joe convention revival ==
Action Force characters have appeared as limited edition toys and comic characters as part of the International G.I. Joe Convention, under the name Special Action Force or SAF (a riff on the SAS; not to be confused with the Philippines' real-life Special Action Force). Instead of being an international group, the Special Action Force is solely a British team and that nation's equivalent to G.I. Joe, though they have several foreign expatriate members. In August 2009, a limited edition Blades (complete with "SAF Copter") was released in both toy and comic book character form as part of the 2009 G.I. Joe convention. He was portrayed as British rather than retaining the American nationality of the original character and assisted both G.I. Joe and their Argentine counterpart Commandos Heroicos.

In April 2010 the Red Shadows and Black Major returned in o-ring style articulation form as part of the G.I. Joe convention. Dubbed 'Vacation in the Shadows' the set featured new versions of Black Major, the Red Shadow trooper, Flint and Cobra's Interrogator as well as six new 'Red Torch' figures who were part of the Red Shadow forces, armed with flamethrowers. In addition to the box set, other convention releases included Dolphin of Q-Force, a 3 3/4in Natalie Poole figure – based on the 1990s Action Man character and retroactively made an SAF agent – and Z Force's Jammer and Gaucho (who appeared in a three-pack with a new version of Joe medic Lifeline). Unlike Blades, Jammer and Gaucho kept their American and Mexican nationalities. Starduster appeared in the comic tie-in. The convention comic featured Flint vacationing in Europe with Dolphin and Natalie before running afoul of Black Major and Interrogator, who were planning an alliance between Cobra and the Red Shadows. In a twist ending, Natalie is brainwashed into being a Shadows sleeper agent.
