= Action Man (2000 TV series) =

2000–2001 television series

- Also known as: Action Man – The Greatest Hero of Them All
- Genre: Action; Biopunk; Cyberpunk; Superhero
- Based on: Action Man by Hasbro
- Developed by: Marty Isenberg and Robert N. Skir
- Starring: Mark Hildreth; Michael Dobson; Tabitha St. Germain; Peter Kelamis
- Theme music composer: Paul Gordon
- Opening theme: "Amp it Up, Action Man", performed by Paul Gordon
- Ending theme: "Amp it Up, Action Man" (instrumental)
- Composers: Shuki Levy; Kussa Mahchi; Michael Whitaker; Paul Gordon
- Countries of origin: Canada; United States
- Original language: English
- No. of seasons: 2
- No. of episodes: 26

Production
- Executive producers: Ian Pearson; Paul Sabella; Jonathan Dern; Carol Monroe
- Producer: Mark Ralston
- Running time: 30 minutes
- Production companies: Mainframe Entertainment; Saban Entertainment

Original release
- Network: Fox Kids (U.S.); YTV (Canada)
- Release: August 5, 2000 – August 20, 2001

Related
- Action Man (1995); A.T.O.M.

Action Man is a 2000 animated television series based on the toy line of the same name. The series aired on Fox Kids and YTV from August 5, 2000 to August 20, 2001. Though unrelated to the 1995 version, it was the first Action Man series to be made in CGI. In this series, Alexander "Alex" Mann is an extreme sports athlete known as "Action Man" and is a member of Team Xtreme.

== Synopsis ==
Alex Mann, Action Man's civilian identity, is an extreme sports athlete of Team Xtreme, taking part in the Mastervision Network's Acceleration Games, a series of unconventional televised sporting activities all over the world. Danger and adrenaline trigger hidden mental powers called the "AMP (Advanced Macro Probability) Factor", a result of secret experiments by his former high school coach Simon Grey. With it, Alex is able to calculate all future possibilities, choosing the best course of action. Alex "Action" Mann, Desmond "Grinder" Sinclair, Agnes "Fidget" Wilson, and Ricky Singh-Baines must stop arch-enemy Doctor X, a brilliant geneticist and bio-engineer, who will stop at nothing to duplicate Alex's AMP Factor to rebuild Earth with the genetically enhanced neo-humanity.

== Cast ==
=== Main ===
- Mark Hildreth as Action Man / Alex Mann
- Michael Dobson as Desmond "Grinder" Sinclair
- Tabitha St. Germain as Agnes "Fidget" Wilson
- Peter Kelamis as Ricky Singh-Baines
- Christopher Judge as Coach Simon Gray
- Tyler Labine as Brandon Caine
- Michael Kopsa as Doctor X (new body)
- Campbell Lane as Doctor X (original body)
- Andrew Francis as Tempest / Templeton Storm
- Janyse Jaud as Asazi
- Garry Chalk as Gangrene / Dr. Wolfgang Greenholtz
- Ian James Corlett as Quake / Sydney

=== Supporting ===
- Mackenzie Gray as Nick Masters
- Venus Terzo as Agent Diana Zurvis
- Michael Donovan
- Kirby Morrow as Jimmy Woo
- Ian James Corlett as Sydney
- Brian Drummond as Craig

== Episodes ==
=== Season 1 (2000) ===
Dr. X captured and physically tested Alex Mann repeatedly, as well as his longtime rival and best friend Brandon Caine. Dr. X also added nanotech enhancements to Brandon, making him superior to Alex in athletics, only for them to have side effects. The culmination of the experiments was to mind transfer Dr. X into Brandon's body, becoming his younger self and nanotech cyborg, able to change his appearance and infect others. Following the ninth episode the series becomes more simplified. Dr. X founded the Council of Doom with his evil cohorts: assassin Asazi and weather manipulating scientist Tempest. Dr. X's nanotech trilobites appeared to gain collective intelligence and rebel against him, but this was actually Brandon Caine's uploaded mind punishing Dr. X.

No.	Title	Directed by	Written by	Original release date
1	"Competitive Edge"	James Taylor	Marty Isenberg & Robert N. Skir	August 5, 2000
After taking part in the Rooftop Road Rage challenge where Alex Mann's long time rival Brandon Kaine almost costs both of them their lives after a slingshot attempt went wrong, Alex discovers he has AMP Factor powers and is able to calculate future factors and the best courses of action to take (these coming in handy when he stops a helicopter from landing on a man's car). When Brandon is eventually released from hospital to take part in the Acceleration Triathlon, Alex sees him acting strangely and then after Brandon beats him he discovers that Brandon had been given an upgrade and his powers are stronger than they are supposed to be. First appearance of: Alex Mann (Action Man), Grinder, Fidget, Ricky, Brandon Kaine, Doctor X (original body) and Nick Masters. Coach Grey also makes an appearance only as a voice.
2	"Building the Perfect Beast"	Steve Ball	Marty Isenberg & Robert N. Skir	August 12, 2000
Doctor X forces Alex and Brandon to run a gauntlet of life and death challenges, in order to transplant Alex's AMP Factor into Brandon. As incentive, Doctor X threatens to murder the captive Fidget if they don't make it in time. Cameo appearance by: Coach Grey (voice only).
3	"Grey Areas"	Steve Sacks	Marty Isenberg & Robert N. Skir	August 19, 2000
After a mysterious figure hired by Doctor X attempts to kill Alex and Fidget, Alex's highschool Coach Grey asks Alex to meet him in person to discuss his future as well as help Alex find out more about his powers which is known as the AMP Factor. Things also get worse when Alex finds out that the assassin hired by Doctor X tries to kill Grinder, Ricky and Fidget as well as try and kill Coach Grey who was her real target. First appearance of: Coach Grey and Asazi. Cameo appearance by: Nick Masters.
4	"Storm Front"	Greg Donis	Steve Melching	August 26, 2000
Nick Masters scapegoats teenage engineering prodigy Templeton Storm for the disastrous failure of Storm's weather-controlling device. However, Storm - accidentally granted electrokinetic powers by his malfunctioning creation - dubs himself Tempest and goes on the warpath to take revenge on Masters. First appearance of: Tempest. Cameo appearance by: Nick Masters.
5	"Gremlin In The Gears"	Craig McEwen	Greg Klein & Thomas Pugsley	September 2, 2000
After being sabotaged by an unknown rider during the Snow Eagle Challenge, Alex's snow eagle is infected by a number of Doctor X's NTB's. It's not long until they infect big air and take out the electrics while being on auto pilot. It's up to Alex to try to get rid of the NTB's from big air as well as prevent them from being shot down for entering restricted military air space. Cameo appearance by: Coach Grey, Nick Masters, Brandon Kaine and Doctor X (original body)
6	"Double Vision"	George Samilski	Marsha F. Griffin	September 9, 2000
A number of crimes take place with what appears to be Alex Mann and following and second crime Agent Diana Zurvis is determined to have Alex locked behind bars. It is up to Alex and his team to try to prove his innocence. First appearance of: Agent Diana Zurvis. Cameo appearance by: Doctor X (original body), Brandon Caine, Coach Grey, Nick Masters.
7	"Into The Abyss"	William Lau	Kaaren Lee Brown	September 16, 2000
Brandon Caine begins trying to prevent Doctor X from controlling him and seeks help from Alex and his team to try to stop X and his plans. This involves returning to the now sunken oil rig in a bid to access information, but all is not as quiet as first thought. First appearance of: Doctor X (new body). Cameo appearance by: Coach Grey and Brandon Kaine. Final appearance of: Doctor X (original body).
8	"Out Of The Shadows"	Sebastian Brodin	Brynne Chandler Reaves	September 23, 2000
Now working on Alex's team as his partner, Brandon and Alex work together when taking part in the Human Pinball Biathlon. Believing that Doctor X is gone for good after witnessing his death at the oil rig, Alex refuses to speak with and believe information that Coach Grey kept secret from him. Doctor X had managed to succeed in downloading his AI programm into Brandon who is now a new younger version of Doctor X. Cameo appearance by: Brandon Caine, Nick Masters and Agent Diana Zurvis.
9	"Lost In The Funhouse"	Steve Sacks	Andrew Robinson	September 30, 2000
During an event at the master dome an earthquake starts damaging the dome and almost kills Fidget and Ricky when the hoops almost land on them. It is found out that the earthquake was started by a mini ultrasonic wave device which can cause earthquakes and when a second one starts from a much bigger device it's down to Alex and his team to save innocent people's lives from death and destroy the device. To make things worse two world leaders from country's which despise each other are attending the event and Doctor X wishes to broadcast fake news stories to each country saying that the other killed their leader in a bid to start war between the two countries. Cameo appearance by: Nick Masters, Coach Grey and Asazi (regular from here).
10	"The Hereafter Factor"	Gio Corsi	Eric Karten	October 28, 2000
Cameo appearance by: Nick Masters, Tempest (regular from here), Coach Grey.
11	"Cold War"	Ezekiel Norton	Marsha F. Griffin	November 4, 2000
Cameo appearance by: Coach Grey and Agent Diana Zurvis.
12	"Swarm: Part 1"	Gino Nichele	Kaaren Lee Brown	November 11, 2000
Cameo appearance by: Agent Diana Zurvis, Nick Masters and Coach Grey.
13	"Swarm: Part 2"	George Samilski	Marty Isenberg & Robert N. Skir	November 18, 2000
Final appearance of: Coach Grey, Branden Kaine and Agent Diana Zurvis.

=== Season 2 (2001) ===
The Council of Doom continues to grow after Brandon was saved from Dr. X. The season features new villains: Gangrene & Quake.

No.	Title	Directed by	Written by	Original release date
14	"Green Thoughts"	Andrew Duncan	Eric Karten	February 26, 2001
First appearance of: Gangrene.
15	"Thirst"	Sebastian Brodin	Marsha F. Griffin	May 2, 2001
16	"Ground Zero"	Angela Ste	Nick DuBois	May 3, 2001
Following an incident during a skating challenge where all electric power is drained away from buildings including from Alex's power blades as well as taking Nick Masters off the air and almost crashing the team extreme helicopter, Alex and his team need to find out what Doctor X and his council of doom are using to drain all electric energy and stop him from turning people into mutants that he can control. Things are made more awkward for Fidget (whose real name is revealed as Agnes) as her older twin sister Candice also tries to find out what Doctor X is trying to do, but she only makes things worse for them. Cameo appearance by: Nick Masters
17	"Tower Of Power"	George Samilski	Len Wein	May 4, 2001
18	"Rumble: Part 1"	Gino Nichele & Colin Adams	Andrew Robinson	May 11, 2001
First appearance of: Quake.
19	"Rumble: Part 2"	Ezekiel Norton	Kurt Weldon	May 18, 2001
20	"Search and Destroy"	Chuck Johnson	Sean Roche	May 25, 2001
21	"The Triton Factor"	Steve Sacks	Brooks Wachtel	June 22, 2001
22	"Mann's Best Friend"	Mark Schiemann	Marsha F. Griffin	June 26, 2001
23	"Mann Hunt"	Sebastian Brodin	Nick DuBois	July 27, 2001
Note: Grinder, Fidget and Ricky do not make an appearance in this episode.
24	"Tangled Up in Green"	Patrick Carroll	Eric Karten	August 10, 2001
25	"The Ultimate Doom - Part 1"	Gio Corsi	Robert N. Skir & Marty Isenberg	August 17, 2001
Final appearance of: Nick Masters.
26	"The Ultimate Doom - Part 2"	Sebastian Brodin	Robert N. Skir & Marty Isenberg	August 21, 2001
Final appearance of: Alex Mann (Action Man), Grinder, Fidget, Ricky, Doctor X, Gangrene, Asazi, Tempest and Quake. Note: This episode was dedicated to the memory of Todd Halford, who was a co-worker and friend of the crew of the show that died before the episode aired.

== Home media releases ==
In the United Kingdom, four VHS were released by 20th Century Fox Home Entertainment and later reissued by Buena Vista Home Entertainment, containing three episodes per tape. One VHS release was also released by Maximum Entertainment.

There have also been VHS releases in other territories such as France.

=== VHS releases ===
Release name	Episodes	Release date	Running time	Additional information
Action Man Vol. 1: The Call to Action	"The Call to Action" (feature-length) "Grey Areas"	July 9, 2001; April 29, 2002 (re-release)	64 minutes	
Action Man Vol. 2: Storm Front	"Storm Front" "Gremlin in the Gears" "Double Vision"	July 9, 2001; April 29, 2002 (re-release)	64 minutes	
Action Man Vol. 3: Out of the Shadows	"Into the Abyss" "Out of the Shadows" "Lost in the Funhouse"	July 9, 2001; April 29, 2002 (re-release)	64 minutes	
Action Man Vol. 4: The Swarm	"The Hereafter Factor" "Cold War" "The Swarm" (Double-Length)	July 9, 2001; April 29, 2002 (re-release)	85 minutes	
Action Man Vol. 5: Green Thought	"Green Thought" "First" "Storm Front"	14 April 2003	63 minutes	
Action Man: Volume 1	"The Call to Action - Part 1" "The Call to Action - Part 2 "Grey Areas"	October 4, 2004	66 minutes	

=== DVD releases ===
In the United Kingdom, The series also saw a few DVD releases as well, released in the UK by Maximum Entertainment.

Release name	Episodes	Release date	Running time	Additional information
Action Man: Volume 1 Action Man: Storm Front	"The Call to Action - Part 1" "The Call to Action - Part 2 "Grey Areas" "Storm Front" "Gremlin in the Gears"	August 30, 2004; 2005 (re-release)	110 minutes	
Action Man: Volume 2 Action Man: Team Xtreme	"Double Vision"; Into the Abyss" "Out of the Shadows" "Lost in the Funhouse" "The Hereafter Factor"	October 2004; June 4, 2007 (re-release)	110 minutes	
Action Man: Competitive Edge - 2 Disc Set (3 Episodes Short of Finishing Season 1)	"The Call to Action - Part 1" "The Call to Action - Part 2 "Grey Areas" "Storm Front" "Gremlin in the Gears" "Double Vision"; Into the Abyss" "Out of the Shadows" "Lost in the Funhouse" "The Hereafter Factor"	2005	3 Hours 40 minutes	
Action Man: Cold War (Last 3 Episodes of Season 1)	"Cold War" "Swarm - Part 1" "Swarm - Part 2"	March 21, 2005	65 minutes approx	
Action Man: Ground Zero - Series 2 (Entirety of Series 2 - 2 Disc Set)	"Green Thoughts" "Thirst" "Ground Zero" "Tower Of Power" "Rumble - Part I" "Rumble - Part II" "Search And Destroy" "The Triton Factor" "Mann's Best Friend" "Mann Hunt" "Tangled Up In Green" "The Ultimate Doom - Part I" "The Ultimate Doom - Part II"	2008	4 hours 36 minutes	

== Video games ==
A video game named Action Man: Search for Base X was released based on the 2000 series.

Hasbro Interactive published the Windows game Action Man: Raid on Island X in the United States as a tie-in to the TV series, despite having nothing to do with it.

== Awards ==
In 2001, the show won a Golden Camera Award at the U.S. and International Film and Video Festival for 'Best Animation' in the episode "The Swarm: Part 2".
