= Energon Universe (comics) =

2023 American comic book line

- Publisher: Skybound Entertainment (Image Comics)
- Publication date: June 2023 – present
- Genre: Action; Adventure; Espionage; Fantasy; Military; Science fiction; Space opera; Techno-thriller
- Main characters: Original brand: Void Rivals; Returning brands: G.I. Joe; M.A.S.K.; Micronauts; Rom; Transformers

Creative team
- Writer: Various
- Artist: Various
- Letterer: Rus Wooton
- Colorist: Various
- Editors: Ben Abernathy; Sean Mackiewicz; Jonathan Manning; Bixie Mathieu

The Energon Universe (EU) is an American mass media franchise and shared fictional universe created and overseen by Robert Kirkman, and being developed by Skybound Entertainment, an imprint of Image Comics, in collaboration with Hasbro.

The franchise is the successor of the Hasbro Comic Book Universe (2005–2018) by IDW Publishing, and features concepts and characters from old and new intellectual properties, including Transformers and G.I. Joe, among others.

This article is about the comics featured in the franchise.

== Publication history ==
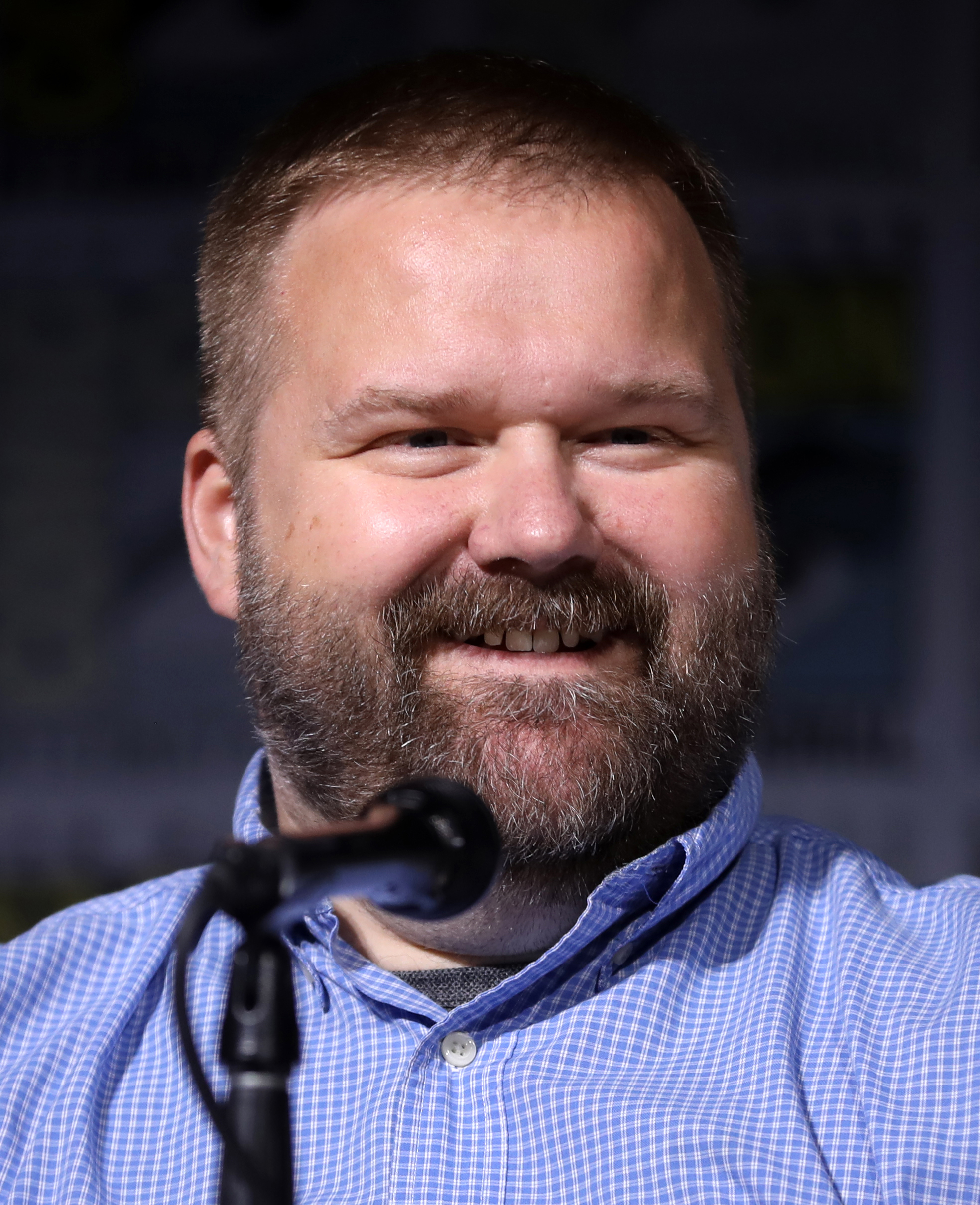
Void Rivals co-creator and writer Robert Kirkman acts as the "showrunner" of the EU comic line. He also writes Transformers since October 2025.

=== Background ===
Before IDW Publishing lost the licenses to produce Transformers and G.I. Joe comics at the end of 2022, in December 2021, it was reported that Skybound Entertainment, an imprint of Image Comics, was in talks with Hasbro to acquire those licenses. Skybound would officially announce it in June 2023.

=== Development ===
==== Phase One ====
The Energon Universe debuted on June 14, 2023, with the original series Void Rivals, written by Robert Kirkman, drawn by Lorenzo De Felici and Conor Hughes, and colored by Matheus Lopes and Patricio Delpeche. Kirkman and De Felici had previously worked together in another comic titled Oblivion Song.

Kirkman said, "It's a tremendous honor to be able to reintroduce this world to a new audience under the Skybound banner. I’ve loved these characters for most of my life and to have the opportunity to add to the already rich tapestry Hasbro has built with the all-new Void Rivals is an unbelievable opportunity. If you look at everything done with Transformers and G.I. Joe, you can see the inkling of a vast universe with tremendous potential for crossovers and interaction that will enhance the fan experience while staying true to the individual identities of both concepts. I look forward to exploring that potential for years to come."

Michael Kelly, who was Vice President of Global Publishing on Hasbro until December 2023, added, “When we first discussed the plan for the surprise reveal in Void Rivals #1, I never expected it would be a secret we could keep for over a year. Now that it is finally here, we are all excited to finally be able to talk about all the amazing stories to come from our great new partners at Skybound.”

Void Rivals is followed by a Transformers ongoing series and four G.I. Joe limited series featuring Duke, Cobra Commander, Scarlett, and Destro as main protagonists. Kirkman also brought up the possibility of adding other action brands from Hasbro in the future, and confirmed that they will not have more than four series running at once, (Note: As depicted in the letters page for Void Rivals #3.) as well as not adding more titles (for now) to keep the line at a manageable, easy-to-follow size. (Note: As depicted in the letters page for Void Rivals #15.)

In June 2024, Skybound officially announced the new G.I. Joe ongoing series that follows its four previous prequels. In November 2024, Skybound announced deluxe editions during the coming years.

==== Phase Two ====
In 2025, characters from the M.A.S.K. franchise were officially introduced into the universe. Matt Trakker (Note: The character appears in the IDW version.) debuted in the G.I. Joe story of the 2025 Special, while Miles Mayhem debuted in Transformers #25. In February 2026, Skybound officially announced a M.A.S.K. ongoing series for June 2026.

In September 2026, Skybound announced four exclusive manga covers for December, featuring art by Satoshi Shiki and Manabu Yashiro.

=== Distribution and localization ===
Publisher	Country	Language	Ref.
Ades Media	Sweden	Swedish	—N/a
Moztros Editorial	Spain	Spanish	
Moztros Editorial	Argentina	Latin American Spanish	
Nagle Comics	Poland	Polish	
Panini Comics	Brazil	Portuguese	—N/a
Panini Comics	Germany	German	—N/a
saldaPress	Italy	Italian	
Szukits Kiadó	Hungary	Hungarian	—N/a
Tiandi Press	China	Chinese	—N/a
Urban Comics	France	French	

== List of publications ==
=== Ongoing series ===
Title	Writer	Artist(s)	Colorist(s)	Debut date
Void Rivals (Note: Original series.)	Robert Kirkman	Lorenzo De Felici; Conor Hughes; Andrei Bressan	Matheus Lopes; Patricio Delpeche	June 14, 2023
Transformers	Daniel Warren Johnson (1–24); Robert Kirkman (25–)	Daniel Warren Johnson; Jorge Corona; Jason Howard; Ludo Lullabi; Dan Mora	Mike Spicer; Sarah Stern; Adriano Lucas	October 4, 2023
G.I. Joe	Joshua Williamson	Tom Reilly; Andrea Milana; Marco Foderà	Jordie Bellaire; Lee Loughridge; Tom Reilly	November 13, 2024
M.A.S.K.	Dan Watters	Simon "Pye" Parr	Pierluigi Casolino	June 3, 2026

=== Limited series ===
Title	Issues	Writer	Artist(s)	Colorist	Debut date	Conclusion date
Duke (Note: G.I. Joe prequel series; Codename: G.I. Joe storyline.)	1–5	Joshua Williamson	Tom Reilly	Jordie Bellaire	December 27, 2023	April 24, 2024
Cobra Commander	1–5	Joshua Williamson	Andrea Milana	Annalisa Leoni	January 17, 2024	May 15, 2024
Scarlett	1–5	Kelly Thompson	Marco Ferrari	Lee Loughridge	June 5, 2024	October 9, 2024
Destro	1–5	Dan Watters	Andrei Bressan; Andrea Milana	Adriano Lucas	June 19, 2024	October 16, 2024

=== Specials ===
Side story	Writer	Artist	Colorist	Release date
Energon Universe 2024 Special
Void Rivals	Robert Kirkman	Lorenzo De Felici	Matheus Lopes	May 4, 2024 (Free Comic Book Day); May 8, 2024 (variant covers)
Transfomers	Daniel Warren Johnson	Ryan Ottley	Mike Spicer	May 4, 2024 (Free Comic Book Day); May 8, 2024 (variant covers)
G.I. Joe	Joshua Williamson	Jason Howard	Annalisa Leoni	May 4, 2024 (Free Comic Book Day); May 8, 2024 (variant covers)
Energon Universe 2025 Special
Void Rivals	Robert Kirkman	Conor Hughes	Patricio Depelche	May 3, 2025 (Free Comic Book Day); May 14, 2025 (variant covers)
Transfomers	Daniel Warren Johnson		Mike Spicer	May 3, 2025 (Free Comic Book Day); May 14, 2025 (variant covers)
G.I. Joe	Joshua Williamson	Andrea Milana	Lee Loughridge	May 3, 2025 (Free Comic Book Day); May 14, 2025 (variant covers)
Energon Universe 2026 Special
Void Rivals	Robert Kirkman	Conor Hughes	Patricio Delpeche	May 2, 2026 (Free Comic Book Day); May 6, 2025 (variant covers)
Transfomers	Robert Kirkman	Jason Howard	Mike Spicer	May 2, 2026 (Free Comic Book Day); May 6, 2025 (variant covers)
G.I. Joe	Joshua Williamson	Tom Reilly	Lee Loughridge	May 2, 2026 (Free Comic Book Day); May 6, 2025 (variant covers)
M.A.S.K.	Dan Watters	Simon "Pye" Parr		May 2, 2026 (Free Comic Book Day); May 6, 2025 (variant covers)

=== One-shots ===
Title	Writers	Artists	Colorists	Release date
M.A.S.K. Origins	Robert Kirkman and Joshua Williamson	Andrea Milana and Dan Mora	Lee Loughridge and Mike Spicer	June 3, 2026
Rom Special	Robert Kirkman	Lorenzo De Felici	Matheus Lopes	June 3, 2026

=== Other ===
Title	Writers	Artists	Release date
Energon Universe 2025 Ashcan	Robert Kirkman and Joshua Williamson	Dan Mora and Tom Reilly	July 27, 2024 (San Diego Comic-Con)
M.A.S.K. Preview/Ashcan #1	Dan Watters	Simon "Pye" Parr	February 25, 2026

== Story arcs ==
Energon Universe story arcs
Series	Volume	Story arc	Issues
Void Rivals	1	"More than Meets the Eye"	6
Void Rivals	2	"Hunted Across the Wasteland"	6 + 2024 Special
Void Rivals	3	"The Key to Vector Theta"	6
Void Rivals	4	"First Chosen"	6
Void Rivals	5	"Quintesson War"	6 + 2025 Special
Void Rivals	6	"Rom"	6 + Rom Special + 2026 Special
Void Rivals	7	"Pit of Destruction"	6
Transformers	1	"Robots in Disguise"	6
Transformers	2	"Transport to Oblivion"	6
Transformers	3	"Combiner Chaos"	6 + 2024 Special
Transformers	4	"Conquer and Control"	6 + 2025 Special
Transformers	5	"Generation One"	6
Transformers	6	"Decepticons Attack!"	6
Transformers	7	"The Ultimate Doom"	6
Duke	1	"Knowing is Half the Battle"	5 + 2024 Special
Cobra Commander	1	"Determined to Rule the World"	5
Scarlett	1	"Secret Mission"	5
Destro	1	"The Enemy"	5
G.I. Joe	1	"The Cobra Strikes!"	6
G.I. Joe	2	"Bludd's Revenge"	6 + 2025 Special
G.I. Joe	3	"Dreadnok War"	6
G.I. Joe	4	"The Hunt for Energon"	6
G.I. Joe	5	"Night Force"	6 + 2026 Special
M.A.S.K.	1	"The Ultimate Weapon"	6 + 2026 Special
M.A.S.K.	2	"Secret Raiders"	6
Total	24 volumes		150 issues

== Reception ==
=== Critical response ===
The EU comics have been receiving general positive reviews for their narrative, tone and complex storylines, with critics praising Void Rivals for the surprising guest appearances of several Transformers and G.I. Joe characters in each issue.

Comic Book Round Up
Series	Critic rating	Ref.
Ongoing series
Void Rivals	8.4	
Transformers	9.1	
G.I. Joe	8.6	
M.A.S.K.	8.8	
Limited series
Duke	8.7	
Cobra Commander	8.5	
Scarlett	8.3	
Destro	8.4	
Other
Annual specials	9.2	

=== Sales ===
Until March 2024, the franchise sold over one million copies of Void Rivals, Transformers, Duke and Cobra Commander in total. Following their highly positive critics, reprints have been made.

In June 2024, Transformers #10, Scarlett #2, Destro #2 and Void Rivals #11 were part of Image's Top 10 Comics in Direct Market.

By Septamber 2026, the line has sold 7.6 million units according to an article from The Hollywood Reporter.

=== Accolades ===
Year	Award	Category	Nominee	Comic	Result	Ref.
2024	Eisner Awards	Best Continuing Series	Daniel Warren Johnson	Transformers	Won	
2024	Eisner Awards	Best Lettering	Rus Wooton	—N/a	Nominated	
2024	Eisner Awards	Best Writer/Artist	Daniel Warren Johnson	Transformers	Won	
2024	ComicBook.com Golden Issue Awards	Best Artist	Jorge Corona	Transformers	Won	
2024	ComicBook.com Golden Issue Awards	Best Colorist	Jordie Bellaire	G.I. Joe	Nominated	
2025	Eisner Awards	Best Coloring	Jordie Bellaire	Duke and G.I. Joe	Won	
2025	Eisner Awards	Best Writer	Kelly Thompson	Scarlett	Nominated	

== Collected editions ==
=== Trade paperback ===
#	Title	Material collected	Pages	Released	ISBN
Void Rivals
1	More than Meets the Eye	Void Rivals #1–6	136	21 Feb 2024	9781534398184
2	Hunted Across the Wasteland	Void Rivals #7–12; Energon Universe 2024 Special (Void Rivals story)	128	4 Sep 2024	9781534328372, 9781534367746
3	The Key to Vector Theta	Void Rivals #13–18	128	10 Jun 2025	9781534326910, 9781534333154
4	First Chosen	Void Rivals #19–24	128	9 Dec 2025	9781534329539, 9781534331617
5	Quintesson War	Void Rivals #25–30; Energon Universe 2025 Special (Void Rivals story)	128	21 Jul 2026	9781534332515
6	Rom	Void Rivals #31–36; Rom #1; Energon Universe 2026 Special (Void Rivals story)	152	23 Feb 2027	978-1534353145
Transformers
1	Robots in Disguise	Transformers #1–6	136	8 May 2024	9781534398177, 9781534327726
2	Transport to Oblivion	Transformers #7–12	128	13 Nov 2024	9781534345270, 9781534354869
3	Combiner Chaos	Transformers #13–18; Energon Universe 2024 Special (Transformers story)	136	27 May 2025	9781534329898, 9781534332683
4	Conquer and Control	Transformers #19–24; Energon Universe 2025 Special (Transformers story)	144	25 Nov 2025	9781534332584, 9781534335653
5	Generation One	Transformers #25–30	144	2 Jun 2026	9781534333550
6	Decepticons Attack!	Transformers #31–36	128	8 Dec 2026	9781534332638
7	The Ultimate Doom	Transformers #37–42			
Codename: G.I. Joe
—N/a	Duke: Knowing is Half the Battle	Duke #1–5; Energon Universe 2024 Special (G.I. Joe story)	112	5 Jun 2024	9781534398160, 9781534327986
—N/a	Cobra Commander: Determined to Rule the World	Cobra Commander #1–5	112	10 Jul 2024	9781534398153, 9781534327856
—N/a	Scarlett: Special Mission	Scarlett #1–5	120	6 Nov 2024	9781534329553, 9781534374140
—N/a	Destro: The Enemy	Destro #1–5	120	20 Nov 2024	9781534357686, 9781534351066
G.I. Joe
1	The Cobra Strikes!	G.I. Joe #1–6	160	17 Jun 2025	9781534328075, 9781534330061
2	Bludd's Revenge	G.I. Joe #7–12; Energon Universe 2025 Special (G.I. Joe story)	128	18 Nov 2025	9781534329904, 9781534330078
3	Dreadnok War	G.I. Joe #13–18	128	13 Mar 2026	9781534333451, 9781534335738
4	The Hunt for Energon	G.I. Joe #19–24	128	29 Sep 2026	9781534330405
5	Night Force	G.I. Joe #25–30; Energon Universe 2026 Special (G.I. Joe story)	144	13 Apr 2027	9781534357532
M.A.S.K.
1	The Ultimate Weapon	M.A.S.K. #1–6; Energon Universe 2026 Special (M.A.S.K. story)	152	2 Feb 2027	9781534353190
2	Secret Raiders	M.A.S.K. #7–12			

=== Hardcover ===
#	Material collected	Pages	Released	ISBN
Void Rivals
1	Void Rivals #1–12; Energon Universe 2024 Special (Void Rivals story)	272	3 Jun 2025	9781534328242, 9781534332508
2	Void Rivals #13–24; Energon Universe 2025 Special (Void Rivals story)	278	23 Jun 2026	978-1534335257
Transformers
1	Transformers #1–12	280	13 May 2025	9781534328235, 9781534329607
2	Transformers #13–24; Energon Universe 2024 Special (Transformers story); Energon Universe 2025 Special (Transformers story)	288	26 May 2026	9781534330481, 9781534330535
Codename: G.I. Joe
1	Duke #1–5; Cobra Commander #1–5; Energon Universe 2024 Special (G.I. Joe story)	256	24 Jun 2025	9781534328228, 9781534333895
2	Scarlett #1–5; Destro #1–5	256	7 Oct 2025	9781534332546, 9781534330559
G.I. Joe
1	G.I. Joe #1–12; Energon Universe 2025 Special (G.I. Joe story)	288	30 Jun 2026	9781534334526, 9781534330191

== See also ==
- List of comics based on Hasbro properties
  - G.I. Joe: A Real American Hero, an unrelated G.I. Joe series published by Skybound
  - Hasbro Universe
    - Hasbro Comic Book Universe by (2005–2018)

=== Other universes ===
- DC Universe (1938–present)
- Marvel Universe (1940–present)
- Comics' Greatest World (1990–2000)
- Valiant Universe (1992–present)
- Image Universe (1992–present)
- Sigilverse (2000–2004)
- Millarworld (2004–present)
- Stan Lee Universe (2010–2011)
- Monsterverse (2014–present)
- Catalyst Prime (2017–2023)
- H1 Ignition (2019–2021)
- The Resistance (2020–2024)
- Massive-Verse (2021–present)
- Nacelleverse (2024–present)
- Underworld (2024–present)
