= M.A.S.K. (comic series) =

American comic book series

Publication information
- Publisher: Skybound Entertainment (Image Comics)
- Genre: Science fiction
- Publication date: June 2026 – present

Creative team
- Written by: Dan Watters
- Artist: Pye Parr
- Colorist: Pierluigi Casolino

M.A.S.K. is an American comic book series published by Skybound Entertainment through Image Comics on June 10, 2026. Based on the franchise of the same name created by Kenner Parker, Jack Forster and Roger Sweet, being owned by Hasbro and Kenner Products, the comic series is part of the Energon Universe comic book line, being written by Dan Watters, with art by Pye Parr and colors by Pierluigi Casolino.

== Premise ==
After being wanted by the federal government for a crime he did not commit, Matt Trakker recruits a group of talented specialists to found the Mobile Armored Strike Kommand (M.A.S.K.) and fight against the Vicious Evil Network of Mayhem (V.E.N.O.M.), led by his former boss turned terrorist Miles Mayhem. However, even the secrets from Trakker's past could affect the team's mission.

== Overview ==
Volume	Title	Issues	First released	Last released	Writer	Artist	Colorists
1	"The Ultimate Weapon"	6 + 2026 Special	May 2, 2026	November 4, 2026	Dan Watters	Marco Ferrari; Pye Parr	Pierluigi Casolino; Pye Parr
2	"Secret Raiders"	6	December 2, 2026	TBA	Dan Watters	Pye Parr	Pierluigi Casolino

== Publication history ==
=== Background ===
Since 1986, several M.A.S.K. comics have been published by DC Comics, Fleetway Publications and IDW Publishing; the latter reimagined M.A.S.K. into the Hasbro Comic Book Universe during the crossover series Revolution, First Strike and Transformers: Unicron.

Since May 2025, the Energon Universe (EU) introduced characters from the M.A.S.K. franchise, starting with Matt Trakker (Note: The character appears in the IDW version.) debuting in the G.I. Joe ongoing series written by Joshua Williamson, while Miles Mayhem debuted in the Transformers ongoing series written by Daniel Warren Johnson and Robert Kirkman.

=== Development ===
In February 2026, during the ComicsPRO yearly convention, Robert Kirkman announced that Skybound Entertainment is launching a new M.A.S.K. comic series by Dan Watters, Pye Parr and Pierluigi Casolino, as part of the EU's second phase. Watters had previously written the Destro miniseries tied to the EU.

Watters said, "Illusion is the ultimate weapon–but also sometimes weapons are the ultimate weapon. M.A.S.K. is a book about ordinary people taking it into their own hands to face down the awesome weaponry of the Energon Universe–and a high octane, nonstop thrill ride to boot. I couldn't be prouder to be bringing you this story alongside Pye this summer. Welcome to the M.A.S.K. network. Matt Trakker needs you to save the world."

Parr added, "80s sports cars! Jets! Lasers! Robots! M.A.S.K. has everything that I love to read, watch, and draw, and my inner 12-year-old fought to the surface and made me scream loudly in the meeting when I was offered this gig. Never have I more bitterly regretted selling my beloved childhood toys, but the chance to rebuild all that stuff on the page has more than made up for it, and I can't wait to see where Dan takes us in the Energon Universe."

The series debuted in June 10, 2026 with a blind bag program containing physical editions of the first two issues, alongside the one-shots M.A.S.K. Origins and Rom.

Issue #3 features the debut appearance of Baron Karza, the antagonist character of the Micronauts franchise.

== Plot ==
Issue	Written by	Drawn by	Colored by	Publication date
=== Volume 1: "The Ultimate Weapon" ===
2026 Special	Dan Watters	Pye Parr	Pye Parr	May 2, 2026
While on the run from the U.S. military (Note: As depicted in G.I. Joe.), Matt Trakker contacts his old colleague Alex Sector to confirm whether Trakker's old boss, Miles Mayhem, was responsible for the destruction of a secret Russian prison. Mayhem and Vanessa Warfield, an ex-C.I.A. agent whom he had previously recruited for her infiltration and demolition skills, had stormed the prison in Mayhem's Bladejet helicopter/jet to rescue psychotic sharpshooter Sly Rax. Trakker speculates that Mayhem is attempting to form his own version of Shadow Watch, the secret government agency the two had worked for, in response to the emerging alien threats they had previously studied. In response, he activates the Mobile Armored Strike Kommand Network and begins contacting potential agents worldwide.
01	Dan Watters	Pye Parr	Pierluigi Casolino	June 10, 2026
Despite his best efforts, Trakker is eventually caught and arrested by the military convoy. He confronts General Flagg for allowing Mayhem to escape with prototypes of M.A.S.K. technology (Note: As depicted in Transformers #28.), and warns him that Mayhem is thoroughly insane and still well-connected within the military. Flagg's attendant reveals himself as a traitor, and both he and Trakker activate miniaturized MASK helmets hidden behind their ears with the ability to shoot lasers from their visors. Although the V.E.N.O.M. double agent attempts to kill Flagg for previously arresting Mayhem (Note: As depicted in Transformers #27.), Trakker and Flagg kill him instead. Flagg tries to negotiate Trakker's return to government work, but he flatly refuses and escapes in his flight-capable Thunderhawk sports car, leaving behind a M.A.S.K. Network recruitment device. Meanwhile, Mayhem, Warfield, and Rax interrogate members of a research team who were affected by the energies of an alien wormhole generator, leaving their bodies riddled with holes. Mayhem kills his captive but ultimately learns the generator's location in the remote snowy wastes of Frusenland, and the three V.E.N.O.M. members discover the device's energies have warped the entire landscape around it.
02	Dan Watters	Pye Parr	Pierluigi Casolino	July 8, 2026
Mayhem attempts to airlift the generator away, but it reactivates and falls into the ocean. In response, Trakker tasks Gloria Baker and Bruce Sato with investigating the incident and the Royal Norwegian Navy vessel that went missing in the area. The two discover that the generator has created a wormhole draining the surrounding ocean to an unknown point in space and time. As they attempt to move closer in Baker's submersible Shark sports car, they discover the remains of the Norwegian ship and lose contact with Trakker. Rax ambushes them in his own submersible Piranha motorcycle, knocking Baker unconscious, but Sato manages to destroy the generator with a missile. They lose Rax and return to the surface, but Mayhem blows up the Shark before Trakker can rescue them.
03	Dan Watters	Pye Parr	Pierluigi Casolino	August 5, 2026
An injured Baker awakens underwater, where Sector activates her MASK's emergency systems and warns her Mayhem is waiting for her to resurface. Trakker arrives to distract Mayhem, and he jettisons himself from the Thunderhawk onto the Bladejet's cockpit. He manages to rip off Mayhem's shirt, revealing a series of intricate tattoos, but is flung off the Bladejet and into a forest. Baker makes it to shore just as her MASK runs out of power; Warfield arrives with the buzzsaw-laden Manta sports car, but is driven away by Sato. The two retrieve Trakker as the V.E.N.O.M. members retreat to their hideout on an old oil tanker, where Rax salvaged a piece of the generator. In his quarters, Mayhem secretly communes with his master – the interdimensional warlord Baron Karza – and promises to stop Trakker by hunting down his son Scott.
04	Dan Watters	Marco Ferrari	Pierluigi Casolino	September 2, 2026
The injured Trakker travels to New Orleans to meet with Dusty Hayes, a former Shadow Watch colleague, and stop a man wearing a MASK helmet from destroying the city. The two realize the helmet's automated homing system fires at anything that moves, and Hayes distracts it with his Gator Jeep/drag racer long enough for Trakker to take the man down. The man admits Mayhem tricked him into putting on the MASK, and Trakker and Hayes realize the helmet is about to detonate. As Trakker works to disarm it, Hayes accuses him of not taking the risks seriously, as he did before in an accident that scarred his face, but Trakker removes the helmet's battery. The man introduces himself as Buddie Hawks, and Trakker realizes the incident was a distraction as Mayhem picks up Scott from a private school in Boulder Hill, New York.
05	Dan Watters	Marco Ferrari	Pierluigi Casolino	October 7, 2026
As Trakker and Hayes debrief a recovering and guilt-ridden Hawks, Mayhem leads Scott into the woods surrounding the school to the Bladejet. Already aware Mayhem is a wanted criminal, Scott summons T-Bob, a gigantic robot bodyguard his father built, to attack V.E.N.O.M., then escapes in the chaos. Trakker is alerted by T-Bob's activation and immediately leaves for Boulder Hill with Hayes, and a recovered Baker agrees to join them. As V.E.N.O.M. searches the woods, Scott repairs T-Bob and orders him to follow the Bladejet to Mayhem's hideout and his father's stolen technology, then ambushes Rax.
06	Dan Watters	Pye Parr	Pierluigi Casolino	November 4, 2026
Rax quickly overwhelms Scott and regroups with Mayhem and Warfield to retreat. As Baker draws Warfield away, General Flagg arrives with air support to distract Mayhem while the ground troops attempt to clear a stalled oil tanker from the road; however, to Trakker's horror, the truck transforms into the Outlaw, a covert laser superweapon he and Hayes had developed for Mayhem. As the two charge the Outlaw's pilot Nash Gorey, Scott awakens and orders T-Bob to stop following Mayhem and destroy the weapon. Although he saves Trakker and Hayes, T-Bob is captured as Gorey, Mayhem, and Warfield flee, and Trakker forces Rax to surrender Scott. As a furious Flagg disavows Trakker, V.E.N.O.M. discovers that T-Bob was powered using an Energon fusion reactor, which Mayhem believes has enough power to open a doorway to another dimension.

== Collected editions ==
#	Title	Material collected	Pages	Released	ISBN
1	The Ultimate Weapon	M.A.S.K. #1–6; Energon Universe 2026 Special (M.A.S.K. story)	152	2 Feb 2027	9781534353190
