= Transformers (Energon Universe) =

American comic book series

Publication information
- Publisher: Skybound Entertainment (Image Comics)
- Schedule: Monthly
- Format: Ongoing series
- Genre: Science fiction
- Publication date: October 4, 2023 – present
- No. of issues: 37 (as of October 2026)
- Main characters: Optimus Prime; Megatron; Elita One; Starscream; Spike Witwicky

Creative team
- Written by: Daniel Warren Johnson (#1–24); Robert Kirkman (#25–present)
- Artists: Daniel Warren Johnson; Jorge Corona; Jason Howard; Ludo Lullabi; Dan Mora
- Editors: Ben Abernathy; Sean Mackiewicz

Transformers is an American science fiction comic book series published by Image Comics and Skybound Entertainment, based on the Transformers franchise by Hasbro and Takara Tomy. It is the second installment in the Energon Universe comic line.

== Publication history ==
After IDW Publishing lost the licenses to produce Transformers and G.I. Joe comics by the end of 2022, Hasbro announced in June 2023 that Skybound Entertainment, an imprint of Image Comics, would acquire those licenses.

Skybound's first Transformers comic is set in the Energon Universe, the first 24 issues being written and initially drawn by Daniel Warren Johnson, and colored by Mike Spicer, and debuted on October 4, 2023. Jorge Corona would later serve as the new artist of the series starting with issue 7.

Johnson said, "To my readers, retailers, and fellow Transformers fans: get ready! I've only been drawing Optimus Prime and the rest of this amazing cast since I was in first grade. This is a dream project for me, and I'm so glad to be adding a new chapter to the decades long celebration of robots turning into cars. Also, cab-over trucks are so fun to draw!"

In June 2023, Skybound announced that the main roster of Autobots features Optimus Prime, Arcee, Cliffjumper, Wheeljack and Ratchet, while the main roster of Decepticons features Starscream, Soundwave, Laserbeak, Rumble and Skywarp.

In June 2025, Void Rivals writer and Energon Universe showrunner Robert Kirkman announced he would become the new leading writer, starting from issue #25 on October 8, 2025.

== Premise ==
When Autobots and Decepticons travel from Cybertron to Earth, their war changes humanity's fate, and only Optimus Prime can save them.

== Overview ==
Volume	Title	Issues	First released	Last released	Writer	Artists	Colorists
1	"Robots in Disguise"	6	October 4, 2023	March 13, 2024	Daniel Warren Johnson	Daniel Warren Johnson	Mike Spicer
2	"Transport to Oblivion"	6	April 10, 2024	September 11, 2024	Daniel Warren Johnson	Jorge Corona; Jason Howard; Lulo Lullabi	Mike Spicer
3	"Combiner Chaos"	6 + 2024 Special	May 4, 2024	March 12, 2025	Daniel Warren Johnson	Ryan Ottley; Jason Howard	Mike Spicer; Sarah Stern
4	"Conquer and Control"	6 + 2025 Special	April 9, 2025	September 10, 2025	Daniel Warren Johnson	Jorge Corona; Daniel Warren Johnson; Ludo Lullabi	Adriano Lucas; Mike Spicer
5	"Generation One"	6	October 8, 2025	March 11, 2026	Robert Kirkman	Jorge Corona; Dan Mora	Mike Spicer; Sarah Stern
6	"Decepticons Attack!"	6 + 2026 Special	April 8, 2026	September 9, 2026	Robert Kirkman	Jason Howard; Ludo Lullabi	Mike Spicer
7	"The Ultimate Doom"	6	October 14, 2026	March 10, 2027	Robert Kirkman	Jason Howard; Karl Kerschl; Howard Porter; Dan Mora	Mike Spicer; Sarah Stern

== Plot ==
Issue	Written by	Drawn by	Colored by	Publication date
=== Volume 1: "Robots in Disguise" ===
01	Daniel Warren Johnson	Daniel Warren Johnson	Mike Spicer	October 4, 2023
In the town of Farmingham, Spike Witwicky finds his father Sparky asleep in a local veterans' bar. After a short argument, Sparky's coworker Davey picks him up while Spike leaves with his girlfriend Carly. The two discover an enormous crashed spaceship, witnessing the Cybertronian alien Jetfire arrive from deep space (Note: As depicted in Void Rivals #1.) and activate the ship's computer, Teletraan 1, to repair his fallen friends. Upon being rebuilt, Starscream destroys the nearby Bumblebee and guns down Jetfire, but is stopped by Optimus Prime. Teletraan 1 randomly reactivates more Autobots and Decepticons, including Skywarp, Ratchet, and Soundwave, and Optimus is pinned down while grieving Bumblebee's body. After Spike and Carly help him break free, he destroys Ravage and the computer and flees with them, Ratchet, and the bodies of several other Autobots. The wounded Jetfire helps drive off Starscream and Skywarp, who are forced to turn back from a lack of Energon. Spike leads the Autobots to an abandoned quarry where Jetfire dies, while Soundwave informs Starscream he needs energy and raw materials to fix Teletraan 1. As Sparky and Davey finish their shift at a local power plant, Starscream arrives and kills Davey.
02	Daniel Warren Johnson	Daniel Warren Johnson	Mike Spicer	November 7, 2023
Optimus and Spike connect with each other over their names, families, and homes – in particular, Optimus tells Spike about how a civil war consumed his homeworld of Cybertron, prompting him and a team of Autobots to flee aboard the Ark. However, the Decepticons and their leader, Megatron, attacked them, and the Ark crash-landed on Earth during the battle. The newly repaired Cliffjumper arrives and brings them back to the quarry, where Ratchet informs them that both they and the Decepticons are critically low on Energon. The Decepticons return to the power plant to convert its energy into Energon, where Soundwave intercepts a U.S. military transmission requesting air support. An amused Starscream destroys the fighter jet and kills its pilot, but its passenger escapes. Sparky flees in the chaos as the Autobots realize the plant is under attack, and Optimus and Spike leave to investigate. Carly returns home to find an armed Sparky barricaded inside, who informs her that Davey, her father, is dead.
03	Daniel Warren Johnson	Daniel Warren Johnson	Mike Spicer	December 6, 2023
Carly realizes that Starscream killed her father as she and Sparky are ambushed by Laserbeak. Cliffjumper saves them, but Sparky shoots him before fleeing with Carly. Starscream and Soundwave send Skywarp to deal with the humans as they bicker over repairing Teletraan 1, while Sparky and Carly take refuge at the veterans' bar, already fortified by a local militia. Cliffjumper arrives and is shot again before Carly can explain, and she distracts Skywarp long enough for Optimus to arrive. Sparky and the militia severely injure the Autobot leader's right arm with a bazooka, and Spike is shot in the crossfire. Optimus rips off his injured arm to beat Skywarp into submission, and asks Sparky to help him save Spike.
04	Daniel Warren Johnson	Daniel Warren Johnson	Mike Spicer	January 10, 2024
Starscream leaves the severely damaged Skywarp behind to pursue the Autobots, but is ambushed by Carly and Cliffjumper. The Autobots arrive at Farmingham Hospital and are attacked by Soundwave, Laserbeak, and Rumble as Spike is rushed inside. Starscream destroys the hospital's power generators, but Ratchet and the freshly repaired Jazz arrive and force the Decepticons to retreat. Optimus uses the Matrix of Leadership to reactivate the hospital as Starscream and Soundwave return to the Ark and rip the injured Skywarp apart to repair Teletraan 1. Jazz shuts down again, having used up the last of the Autobots' Energon, and Ratchet berates Optimus for prioritizing the humans' safety over their survival. Optimus reluctantly accepts Ratchet and Sparky's ideas to regain a foothold as Cliffjumper comforts a grief-stricken Carly, revealing that Starscream also killed his family on Cybertron during the war. Starscream gloats over successfully reactivating Teletraan 1 as Optimus rallies the Autobots and humans, having replaced his missing right arm with Megatron's.
05	Daniel Warren Johnson	Daniel Warren Johnson	Mike Spicer	February 14, 2024
Optimus and Sparky connect over their wartime experiences as the Decepticons use Teletraan 1 to repair and revive Thundercracker, Frenzy, and Reflector. Thundercracker is horrified to see Skywarp disassembled and integrated into the computer's systems, but Starscream assures him he sacrificed himself for the greater good. The Decepticons leave to find the Autobots as Sparky, Ratchet, and a half-assembledWheeljack finish building a water turbine to convert the local dam's power into Energon. They revive Arcee before the Decepticons attack, and Optimus kills Reflector and Frenzy and injures Starscream with Megatron's arm-mounted fusion cannon. The Decepticons retreat after destroying the turbine, and the Autobots decide to pursue their enemies, with Sparky accompanying Optimus and Cliffjumper secretly bringing Carly along. However, they are beset by the revived Constructicons upon arriving at the Ark, and Starscream orders them to combine into Devastator.
06	Daniel Warren Johnson	Daniel Warren Johnson	Mike Spicer	March 13, 2024
The Autobots manage to escape into the Ark, but Devastator tears off Ratchet's leg and mortally wounds Optimus. Cliffjumper and Carly sneak into the ship and encounter Starscream while Devastator begins digging into the mountain. As the Autobots despair, Sparky sacrifices himself to the Matrix of Leadership to repair Optimus, who promises to protect Spike and Earth in his honor. The Autobot leader attacks Devastator as Carly and Cliffjumper subdue Starscream; however, Cliffjumper hesitates to deliver the killing blow, and Starscream seizes the opportunity to crush Carly. She is saved when Optimus throws Devastator off the mountain, injuring Starscream as he falls. The Constructicons decombine and retreat with Starscream, and Soundwave rejects Optimus' peace offering before leaving with Thundercracker. At the hospital, Spike awakens and asks where his father is.
=== Volume 2: "Transport to Oblivion" ===
07	Daniel Warren Johnson	Jorge Corona	Mike Spicer	April 10, 2024
On Cybertron, an Autobot squad is killed while storming a Decepticon fortress; their leader, Elita One, breaks in and finds an Autobot prisoner stripped down to a near-skeletal pile of parts. On Earth, the captain of the aircraft carrier U.S.S. Henry Harrison is ordered to investigate reports of giant robots as Soundwave challenges Starscream for leadership of the Decepticons. He mortally wounds Starscream in the resulting duel and disposes of his body, promising the remaining Decepticons they will rebuild together. At the Ark, Carly bonds with Arcee over target practice, who tells her how she was trained by the great Autobot warrior Ultra Magnus after her family died in the war. As they shoot, Cliffjumper confides in Jazz about his strained relationship with Carly after failing to kill Starscream, while a recovering Spike declines to speak with Optimus and Ratchet. As they return to the Ark, Optimus is suddenly overcome by a mysterious vision of himself holding a baby human. Wheeljack tells them that the Skywarp-controlled Teletraan 1 refuses to repair any more Autobots, and Optimus suggests building an aerial transport from Jetfire's remains.
08	Daniel Warren Johnson	Jorge Corona	Mike Spicer	May 8, 2024
As Carly and Spike grieve the deaths of their fathers. Elita promises to kill the prisoner herself rather than face recapture. The Decepticons attack and sink the Henry Harrison, and Thundercracker lets the ship's crew escape, but Soundwave reluctantly kills them to ensure their silence. Still angry with Cliffjumper, Carly threatens to destroy Skywarp's remains with a missile launcher, not realizing it would also destroy Teletaan 1. Arcee deflects her accidental shot, and Skywarp fully repairs Wheeljack's legs in gratitude; a furious Carly storms off and later confesses to Arcee that she doesn't understand why the Autobots don't act like the powerful warriors she sees them as. As Arcee explains how Optimus rallied them together at great personal sacrifice, Ratchet revives a blinded, immobile Jetfire in his alternate shuttle mode. The Decepticons use the sunken Henry Harrison’s nuclear reactor to partially reactivate the Nemesis, the Decepticon ship that pursued the Ark to Earth. They find the imprisoned Astrotrain inside, who agrees to help once Soundwave promises he can kill Megatron. The Autobots detect the Decepticon activity and depart with Jetfire, leaving Carly, Arcee, and Wheeljack behind, as Soundwave makes contact with Shockwave on Cybertron.
09	Daniel Warren Johnson	Jorge Corona	Mike Spicer	June 12, 2024
The Nemesis activates a space bridge connecting Earth and Cybertron, and Jetfire crashes on the ocean floor from the energy surge. The Constructicons attack the Autobots as Shockwave arrives on Earth and kills Ratchet. As Optimus and Shockwave battle, the Farmingham militia confronts Wheeljack and Arcee on their way back to the dam, but Carly convinces them to stand down. Astrotrain kidnaps Spike from the hospital, and Elita and the Autobot prisoner escape through the space bridge portal, arriving on Earth as well. The Combaticons pursue them, but only Onslaught makes it through the portal before Elita destroys it, bisecting Brawl. She forces Optimus to retreat with the prisoner while Shockwave captures the injured Cliffjumper and Jazz and orders the Decepticons to repair the space bridge. As Astrotrain prepares to deliver Spike to Soundwave and Shockwave, he is shot down by Beachcomber.
10	Daniel Warren Johnson	Jorge Corona	Mike Spicer	July 10, 2024
Beachcomber chains up Astrotrain and tells Spike his story: millions of years ago, when the Ark and Nemesis crash-landed on Earth, Beachcomber was thrown away from the battle and landed on the Moon. He hitched a ride to Earth on the Apollo 11 return flight eons later, entranced by the planet's natural beauty, and discovered the crashed Ark while exploring. However, he chose not to reactivate his fellow Autobots, fearing their war would inevitably destroy Earth. Astrotrain brags that Shockwave plans to strip Earth's natural resources to save Cybertron, but the pacifistic Beachcomber refuses to fight. On the Nemesis, Shockwave is distracted by a pod of humpback whales outside the ship while chiding Soundwave for trying to repair Ravage; however, instead of appreciating their organic beauty, Shockwave activates a machine that kills the whales and converts their remains into Energon. Optimus and Elita return to the dam, where Arcee recognizes the prisoner as Ultra Magnus, and a distraught Wheeljack leaves after hearing of Ratchet's death. As Elita confronts Optimus over abandoning Cybertron to the Decepticons and Shockwave tortures Cliffjumper and Jazz, Thundercracker privately confides his doubts to Soundwave. Although Soundwave also has reservations, he maintains that the Decepticons need Shockwave's methods to succeed and denies a request to rescue Skywarp. Using the gathered energy, Shockwave reactivates the space bridge and transports Cybertron into Earth's orbit.
11	Daniel Warren Johnson	Jorge Corona	Mike Spicer	August 14, 2024
As Beachcomber investigates the natural disturbances caused by Cybertron's arrival, a guilt-ridden Arcee apologizes to an unconscious Magnus for failing him. Wheeljack suggests postponing Magnus' extensive repairs and reviving more Autobots instead with their limited Energon, but he awakens and begs to join the fight. Shockwave again dismisses Soundwave's concern for Ravage, returns to Cybertron, and orders the other Combaticons to defend their side of the space bridge at all costs. The Autobots deduce that destroying the Nemesis will sever the connection between Earth and Cybertron, but Elita balks at rescuing Cliffjumper and Jazz over toppling Shockwave's control of Cybertron, especially with his new Energon stores. Using Teletraan 1, now fully integrated with Skywarp's teleportation abilities, Optimus, Elita, and Arcee teleport onto the Nemesis and split up; Elita plants enough explosives to destroy the ship while Optimus and Arcee ambush Shockwave and rescue Cliffjumper and Jazz. As Spike urges Beachcomber to reconsider his neutrality for Earth's sake, Optimus stops Arcee from giving in to her rage and killing the Decepticon scientist. However, Shockwave uses the moment of hesitation to take Cliffjumper hostage and order the Constructicons to combine into Devastator. Wheeljack and a freshly repaired Magnus arrive as backup, but Magnus panics at the sight of Shockwave and flees.
12	Daniel Warren Johnson	Jorge Corona	Mike Spicer	September 11, 2024
Without Ultra Magnus, the Autobots are quickly pushed back, but Carly teleports her van into the midst of the chaos to save Cliffjumper. Their reunion is short-lived, though, as Devastator smashes the van and throws it, along with Cliffjumper, back through the space bridge portal. The other Autobots target Devastator until he falls and crushes part of the Nemesis, disconnecting Cybertron from Earth. Shockwave flees through the still-active portal to gather reinforcements, but Optimus follows him and takes down Swindle, Vortex, and Blast Off. Another vision of the human baby overtakes him as he pins Shockwave down, but it shifts into a nightmare: the baby becomes trapped in a sea of wires, and Optimus crushes the Decepticon's head. Elita approves of the ruthless action and stops a horrified Optimus as he and Cliffjumper attempt to return to Earth. She reveals she never planted the charges on the Nemesis and urges him to stay on Cybertron and continue harvesting energy from Earth to win the war. Optimus refuses to sacrifice Earth and destroys the Energon reserves, severing the connection and blasting him and a large chunk of Cybertron back into Earth's atmosphere. Beachcomber saves Optimus as the shard of Cybertron crashes into the ocean.
=== Volume 3: "Combiner Chaos" ===
2024 Special	Robert Kirkman	Ryan Ottley	Mike Spicer	May 4, 2024
As the Ark crash-lands on Earth, Megatron tears through the Autobots aboard and kills Brawn during the battle. A furious Optimus slices off Megatron's right arm and kicks him out of the ship, and Starscream shoots him to usurp command of the Decepticons. Much later, Megatron awakens inside the underground laboratories of Cobra-La, now missing an eye and his other arm. (Note: As depicted in Cobra Commander #1.) He breaks free of his restraints and kills one of the scientists, but allows the other to live in exchange for the return of his left arm. Golobulus, Cobra-La's ruler, breaches the laboratory with a massive army and orders them to destroy Megatron. Although the Decepticon leader kills many Cobra-La warriors and creatures, including Golobulus' enormous war beast, Golobulus himself manages to stab out his remaining eye. Blinded, Megatron flees and bursts out into a snowy mountainous wasteland, where he swears vengeance on Starscream.
13	Daniel Warren Johnson	Jason Howard	Mike Spicer	October 13, 2024
Mangled and mortally wounded after his duel with Soundwave, Starscream flashes back to his past on Cybertron: Ulchtar and his two friends Genvo and Jetfire spent a last night together before the latter's departure. Genvo urged Ulchtar and Jetfire to join his faction of the burgeoning civil war, but Jetfire refused and vowed to find a peaceful solution to Cybertron's energy crisis while off-world. The enormous Guardian robot Omega Supreme suddenly flew overhead, and Ulchtar decided to detonate a small ammunition depot to get their attention. The plan worked, and the gigantic Cybertronian waved at the three before departing. Sometime later, after Jetfire also left Cybertron, Ulchtar's lab was destroyed in the crossfire of a sudden attack. An injured Genvo died in his arms, and Ulchtar believed the Autobots were responsible. Megatron, the leader of Genvo's faction, recruited Ulchtar and offered him the power to destroy his enemies; Ulchtar agreed and renamed himself Starscream after Genvo's last words. Although Starscream awakens to find his legs have melted off in a pool of lava, he falls unconscious again as a team of M.A.R.S. Industries salvage operatives claim his body.
14	Daniel Warren Johnson	Jason Howard	Mike Spicer	November 13, 2024
Starscream awakens to find the M.A.R.S. team has crudely grafted his upper body onto the top of their H.I.S.S. tank, complete with a remote control. Although enraged and humiliated, he begrudgingly agrees to work with the humans after the commanding officer Horton reveals they planted explosives inside his body. Starscream and the M.A.R.S. team find the chained Astrotrain, who agrees to join them if Starscream keeps Soundwave's promise to kill Megatron. The conversation is interrupted when the Cybertron shard falls into the ocean, creating a tidal wave; Starscream and Astrotrain try to flee, but Horton forces the Decepticons to save the M.A.R.S. team too. Horton is knocked unconscious as Astrotrain also rescues the Combaticons from the devastation, and he awakens to find that Starscream repaired Brawl and removed the explosives. Starscream kills all but one of the M.A.R.S. operatives and revenge on Soundwave.
15	Daniel Warren Johnson	Jorge Corona	Mike Spicer	December 11, 2024
To attract the Autobots' attention, Soundwave orders the Decepticons to destroy the city of Tacoma, Washington; although Thundercracker complies, he is wracked with guilt and allows a group of humans to escape. As Arcee, Carly, Spike, and Beachcomber leave the Ark to find Ultra Magnus, Cliffjumper reunites with fellow Autobots Bluestreak, Warpath, and Blurr on Cybertron. Optimus, Wheeljack, and Jazz also leave to investigate the Decepticon attack on Tacoma, where they theorize that the Matrix, potentially influenced by Sparky's sacrifice, is causing Optimus' mysterious visions. They are driven away from Tacoma by the survivors and first responders, and Optimus rips a tank apart as he is overtaken by another nightmarish vision of the baby trapped in a heap of wires. Watching from afar, Soundwave resolves to ambush their enemies later, then sends Laserbeak on a secret mission. Cliffjumper is disturbed when the Autobots cannibalize the Decepticon Ramjet for his Energon as he encounters Elita again. After returning to the dam, Optimus' team revives Trailbreaker and is attacked by both Starscream and Soundwave's Decepticons. To their shock, however, Starscream ignores the Autobots and orders the Combaticons to combine into Bruticus and destroy Soundwave.
16	Daniel Warren Johnson	Jorge Corona	Mike Spicer	January 8, 2025
Cliffjumper, Elita, and Bluestreak visit what was once the home of Cliffjumper's family; he reveals that, before leaving Cybertron, he had salvaged the remains of their sparks and hidden them away, hoping to someday use them to create a new Autobot. The Constructicons merge into Devastator to counter Bruticus, and Starscream accidentally reveals the truth of Skywarp's "sacrifice" to Thundercracker, who throws him off the dam and flees. Caught in the Decepticon infighting, Optimus destroys the dam with Megatron's cannon, washing all the Cybertronians away. Trailbreaker saves a group of children with his force fields as Cliffjumper resolves to bring his family's sparks to the Well of All Sparks, the place where new Cybertronian life is created. Elita argues that the Well lies deep in Decepticon territory, but Cliffjumper and Bluestreak believe the chance to create a new Autobot warrior is worth the risk. As Carly, Spike, Arcee, and Beachcomber keep searching for Magnus, Laserbeak finds the object of his own search – the wounded and blinded Megatron.
17	Daniel Warren Johnson	Jorge Corona	Mike Spicer	February 12, 2025
Thundercracker returns to the empty Ark and reunites with the imprisoned Skywarp, while Arcee, Carly, Spike, and Beachcomber find Magnus hidden away in an enormous crude wooden fortress within the San Juan Islands. As the Autobots on Cybertron prepare to attack, Bluestreak reminds the bitter Elita that, although he left Cybertron, Optimus managed to take down Shockwave during his brief return, giving them the opportunity to create a new Autobot. On Earth, the Decepticons' conflict spills into Seattle as Elita's team storms the Well of All Sparks and takes out Decepticon guards Thrust and Ratbat. Cliffjumper begins the creation process as Devastator and Bruticus ravage the city, and Optimus orders the Autobots to rescue as many humans as possible. To finish the Well's creation program, Cliffjumper has Blades submit Carly's van as an alternate mode for the new Autobot, who names themselves Shredhead.
18	Daniel Warren Johnson	Jorge Corona	Mike Spicer	March 12, 2025
As the newly-created Shredhead saves the Autobots from Decepticon reinforcements, Magnus confesses to Arcee, Carly, Beachcomber, and Spike that his imprisonment and torture at Shockwave's hands still weigh heavily on him. Carly reassures him that the others share his fear, but a small army suddenly attacks the fortress, abducting Magnus and a tranquilized Carly. In Seattle, the Autobots continue protecting the humans as the Decepticons rampage through the city. Rumble shoots down Starscream and Astrotrain atop a nearby skyscraper, and Bruticus and Devastator climb the building to reach them. At the top, Devastator throws himself and Bruticus off the skyscraper, and their fall levels a city block. Starscream and Soundwave duel again on the roof, but are stopped by Megatron's return. He revives Ravage with the power of his own spark, and Soundwave returns to his master's side as a horrified Optimus orders the Autobots to retreat.
=== Volume 4: "Conquer and Control" ===
19	Daniel Warren Johnson	Ludo Lullabi	Adriano Lucas	April 9, 2025
Sometime in the past, before the beginning of the Cybertronian civil war, Megatron awoke in a cell on the planet Quintessa as a captive of the Quintessons. The Quintesson Prosecutor Dezimir ordered a trial to earn his freedom and used a strange device to subdue Megatron as he was thrown into an arena. Megatron easily cleared the arena's traps and hordes of Sharkticons but was crushed when Dezimir summoned a gigantic monster called the Mechanokoar. To his bewilderment, Megatron reawoke perfectly intact in the same cell and was thrown back into the arena by Dezimir, where the Mechanokoar once again destroyed him. The cycle repeated hundreds of times until Megatron finally begged for mercy, and Dezimir's unseen master declared the trial over. Megatron was granted the device's power – a dark opposite of the Matrix of Leadership – and assumed a new handheld gun form to control his wielder. With this new power, Megatron forced Dezimir to kill the Mechanokoar, then returned to Cybertron to take control of the Decepticons.
2025 Special	Daniel Warren Johnson	Daniel Warren Johnson	Mike Spicer	May 3, 2025
On Cybertron, sometime in the past, Jazz is part of a band with Cliffjumper, Bluestreak, Arcee, and Blurr. Due to his constant improvisation and inability to stay on the beat, the other band members kick Jazz out right before a big performance. Later that evening, Optimus finds Jazz listening to strange sounds on an intergalactic radio created by Wheeljack. Entranced by the noise, which he believes to be alien music, Jazz vows to someday find its source, but Optimus politely asks him to turn the radio off. Later, on Earth, Jazz suddenly hears the noise again and swerves away to follow it. He and Optimus track the sound to a cocktail lounge, where Jazz discovers with delight that it belongs to a group of jazz musicians playing for the lounge's patrons.
20	Daniel Warren Johnson	Jorge Corona	Mike Spicer	May 14, 2025
A vengeful Astrotrain challenges Megatron to single combat for killing his love and imprisoning him in the Nemesis, but he is defeated and thrown off the skyscraper. At a secret military base, a soldier reports to Doc on a captured Ultra Magnus while the Autobots regroup at the Ark to prepare for Megatron's imminent assault. Spike finally approaches Optimus to ask what happened to his father; a guilty Optimus apologizes for not being able to retrieve Sparky's spirit from the Matrix and for not controlling the dark feelings growing within his mind. Spike urges him to continue holding on to hope as Beachcomber and Silverbolt return to the Ark with Jetfire. Wheeljack revives the other Aerialbots – Air Raid, Fireflight, Skydive, and Slingshot – with the last of their Energon, and they happily reunite with Optimus as a hidden Thundercracker watches from the shadows. Cliffjumper confides in Shredhead about his fears for Carly on Cybertron, while Megatron leads the reunified Decepticons to a stockpile of resources hidden on the Cybertron Shard in the middle of the ocean. He fully repairs and restores Starscream, to the latter's shock, then beats him into submission again as the other Decepticons watch. Megatron forces Starscream to kill Astrotrain with his gun mode and vows to take back his missing arm from the Autobots.
21	Daniel Warren Johnson	Jorge Corona	Mike Spicer	June 11, 2025
Technicians under General Flagg's supervision begin torturing Magnus, to Doc's horror, while Bluestreak and Warpath finish repairing one of Shockwave's space bridge portals. However, they only have enough Energon to transport one Autobot to Earth, and Elita decides to send either Cliffjumper or Shredhead to retrieve Optimus. While running a diagnostic test on the Matrix, Wheeljack realizes that Megatron's arm is somehow blocking the artifact's power from recharging, but the Decepticons launch a full-force assault on the Ark. As Bruticus and Devastator begin fighting among themselves, Optimus suddenly aims Megatron's cannon at Jazz and Wheeljack during the battle; before he can fire, Thundercracker uses Teletraan 1 to teleport himself, Skywarp, and the entire Ark away, leaving the Autobots defenseless. Megatron breaks up the squabbling combiners, and the Aerialbots combine into Superion, giving the Autobots enough time to regroup. Finally realizing Megatron's arm is corrupting him, Optimus orders his troops to shoot it off, and the Autobots flee as Megatron reclaims and reattaches it. With his full strength restored, he fires a blast in gun mode that severs Superion's left arm from his body. The Autobots are forced to leave the mortally wounded Slingshot at Megatron's mercy, who rips his head off and orders the Decepticons onward.
22	Daniel Warren Johnson	Jorge Corona	Mike Spicer	July 9, 2025
After the wounded Superion crash-lands, the Autobots are towed back to Farmingham by a convoy led by Doctor Lio, the hospital director. Cliffjumper throws Shredhead through the space bridge portal, and a furious Elita captures him as the portal explodes. Outside the hospital, Lio shows the Autobots Ratchet's body, retrieved from the bottom of the ocean by the Coast Guard. Still unable to access the Matrix's power, Optimus begins to succumb to the infection from Megatron's arm, but Spike offers himself as a conduit between the Autobot leader and the Matrix. The artifact's power overwhelms both, and Optimus appears in the Hall of the Primes, an ancient repository of wisdom within the Matrix. Meanwhile, Megatron calls off the search for the Autobots and orders an attack on a nearby military force instead. As the Decepticons slaughter the soldiers, Flagg interrogates a belligerent Carly while Doc frees Ultra Magnus. The giant Autobot escapes with Carly and Doc, who reveals he was once tortured as a prisoner of war, and his words inspire Magnus to rejoin the fight. As he and Carly leave to find the Autobots, Lio and Wheeljack keep the comatose Optimus and Spike stable while everyone evacuates to Chicago.
23	Daniel Warren Johnson	Jorge Corona	Mike Spicer	August 13, 2025
Shredhead appears on Earth and sets out to find Carly as Starscream discovers the Autobots evacuating humans to the Adler Planetarium, where Wheeljack has constructed a makeshift right arm for the unconscious Optimus. Within the Matrix, Optimus finds that Megatron's infection has corrupted much of the Primes' wisdom, but Sparky's spirit saves him. As the Decepticons advance on the planetarium, refugees from Farmingham, Tacoma, Seattle, and Chicago pay their respects to Optimus for saving them. Carly and Ultra Magnus arrive, and Magnus rallies the Autobots for their last stand in Optimus' honor. Beachcomber stays behind as the Autobots and Decepticons clash outside the planetarium, while Sparky realizes that Optimus' mysterious visions have been intertwined with his own memories of raising Spike. Against Megatron's orders, Starscream breaks into the planetarium and shoots Beachcomber as he defends Carly. Sparky urges Optimus not to give in to Megatron's infectious hate, and the Autobot leader reaffirms his promise to protect Spike as they purify the Matrix together. Megatron savagely beats Starscream for his disobedience, and Optimus and Spike reawaken just before he can kill the refugees. The other Decepticons arrive to support Megatron, but he orders them back as he attacks Optimus.
24	Daniel Warren Johnson	Jorge Corona	Mike Spicer	September 10, 2025
Optimus gains the upper hand over Megatron, but the Decepticon leader kills the refugees to break his guard. Transforming into gun mode, Megatron has Starscream impale Optimus atop a skyscraper, where he gives the Autobot leader a final test: choose between executing Spike and Carly or Beachcomber, with all three dying if he refuses to choose. With Optimus unwilling to cooperate, Starscream prepares to kill the humans; however, everyone is awestruck by the sudden arrival of Omega Supreme, drawn to Earth by a beacon on the ocean-bound piece of Cybertron. The ancient Cybertronian waves to Starscream as they fly overhead, and the reminder of his past breaks Starscream free of Megatron's control, prompting him to shoot himself in the head. Before Megatron can kill Spike and Carly, Shredhead suddenly cuts him and Soundwave down, and Optimus throws him off the skyscraper. The Decepticons escape with Starscream's body. As everyone collects themselves, Optimus notices that the Matrix has finally reactivated, leaving him cured of Megatron's infection.
=== Volume 5: "Generation One" ===
25	Robert Kirkman	Dan Mora Jorge Corona	Mike Spicer	October 8, 2025
The injured Decepticons retreat to the Nemesis, where Megatron rallies them for the next phase of their fight against the Autobots. They toss Starscream's body into a scrap heap with the remains of Reflector, Frenzy, and Astrotrain, unaware that he is seemingly still alive. While assisting with search-and-rescue efforts, the Autobots find Soundwave buried beneath the wreckage. After Optimus subdues him, General Flagg arrives and offers the Autobots an alliance with the United States government to prevent further Decepticon attacks. Optimus leaves with Flagg while Wheeljack, Jazz, and Ultra Magnus bring the imprisoned Soundwave back to the mountain where the Ark used to be; however, to their surprise, they witness the ship teleporting back into its original crashed position. As a sign of trust, Flagg gives Optimus a massive stockpile of Energon and the deactivated Autobots Bulkhead and Mirage on behalf of the secret government organization Shadow Watch and its leader, Miles Mayhem. After securing Soundwave in the Ark’s brig, Jazz and Wheeljack are ambushed by a horrified Thundercracker, who accidentally teleported himself into Cobra-La. Meanwhile, on Cybertron, Elita rages at the loss of Shredhead and swears vengeance on Optimus.
26	Robert Kirkman	Dan Mora	Mike Spicer	November 12, 2025
Thundercracker tries removing Skywarp from Teletraan 1 to prevent another teleportation accident. Optimus returns to the Ark with Flagg and Shadow Watch's gifts, and Thundercracker agrees to stand down in exchange for restoring Skywarp. As Wheeljack thanks Flagg for the resources and begins separating Skywarp and Teletraan 1, Beachcomber, Shredhead, Arcee, Carly, and Spike continue assisting search-and-rescue operations in Chicago. At Shadow Watch headquarters, Mayhem obtains a complete technical scan of Optimus' transformation sequence, then kills the technician who collected the data. On Cybertron, Cliffjumper reluctantly agrees to help Elita repair the space bridge, though he remains adamant that neither he nor Optimus betrayed the Autobot cause. Skywarp attacks the Autobots upon being revived and disowns Thundercracker for his supposed betrayal as he escapes. Shaken but resolute in his convictions, Thundercracker decides to stay with the Autobots. Meanwhile, the Decepticons fail to salvage enough Energon from the wreckage of Shockwave's underwater harvester; before he can reprimand them, Megatron collapses in agony.
27	Robert Kirkman	Dan Mora	Mike Spicer	December 10, 2025
Wheeljack and Teletraan 1 manage to revive and restore several Autobots, including Bulkhead, Mirage, Jetfire, Brawn, Sideswipe, and Blaster. Trailbreaker brings the newly repaired Autobots up to speed on current events as Magnus tries to blackmail Flagg over his earlier imprisonment and torture, but he is easily rebuffed. Skywarp helps the Combaticons raid the Hoover Dam for Energon while Optimus and Thundercracker have a heart-to-heart about the latter's defection and their shared respect for Earth. Flagg arrests Mayhem at Shadow Watch's headquarters for treason as Wheeljack and Thundercracker, now adorned with Autobot faction emblems, convince Optimus not to revive the remaining Decepticons aboard the Ark. Magnus privately admits to Arcee that he no longer feels worthy of his title and asks her to succeed him as the Autobots' Magnus. With everyone repaired, Optimus rallies the Autobots to strike back against the Decepticons; meanwhile, Cliffjumper sneaks through Decepticon-occupied territory to salvage the space bridge, unaware he is being stalked by a heavily damaged but still functional Shockwave.
28	Robert Kirkman	Dan Mora	Mike Spicer	January 14, 2026
The distressed Megatron lashes out, believing he is Dezimir's prisoner again; however, the moment passes as the Combaticons return to the Nemesis with Skywarp, who informs Megatron of Soundwave's imprisonment. He orders the Decepticons to prepare a rescue while Ultra Magnus begins upgrading Arcee into the Autobots' next Magnus. He stands firm in his decision to step down, despite Optimus' worry about breaking Autobot tradition, while Thundercracker warns Soundwave that he will eventually be forced to choose between his own cares and Decepticon hatred. Mayhem kills his guards with an acid-spewing mask and escapes in the chaos. Carly and Spike return to Farmingham and move in together, and the latter reveals he no longer plans to attend Berkeley and become an astronaut. Arcee awakens in a larger, stronger body and officially takes on the title of Magnus, but Optimus urges a reluctant Ultra Magnus to share the role with her. As her first act of leadership, Arcee Magnus prepares the Autobots to investigate Decepticon activity, but notices Trailbreaker has not returned from his patrol. The Decepticons ambush him outside the Ark, and Megatron rips him apart to consume his spark, permanently killing him.
29	Robert Kirkman	Dan Mora	Sarah Stern	February 11, 2026
As the disturbed Decepticons watch Megatron feast on Trailbreaker's remains, a furious Optimus arrives with the other Autobots. Hook, Scavenger, and Bonecrusher slip into the Ark to free Soundwave; although Arcee and Ultra Magnus bar their way out, the three Constructicons combine into Devastator's upper half and overpower them. Bulkhead leads many of the Autobots in taking down Bruticus while Megatron attempts to execute Thundercracker for his defection, but another psychic attack overwhelms him. The Autobots overwhelm the Decepticons, but Scrapper, Mixmaster, and Long Haul sneak away from the battle and reunite with the other Constructicons. The fully-completed Devastator creates enough of a diversion for the Decepticons to escape with Soundwave, an incapacitated Megatron, and the deactivated Blitzwing, Dirge, and Slipstream. Optimus attempts to rally the Autobots in pursuit, but he is stopped by the sudden reappearance of Elita and Cliffjumper.
30	Robert Kirkman	Dan Mora	Mike Spicer	March 11, 2026
Heedless of the retreating Decepticons, Elita urges Optimus to come back to Cybertron, and challenges him for leadership of the Autobots when he refuses. As the others watch, Elita attacks Optimus and tries to rip the Matrix from his chest, and he eventually forces her to stand down when Carly and Spike arrive. Although Optimus condemns Elita's attempt to take leadership by force, he empathizes with her devotion to Cybertron and willingly surrenders the Matrix and the title of Prime to her. The newly minted Elita Prime is upgraded into a new body and orders the Autobots to choose between returning to Cybertron with her or staying on Earth. Ultra Magnus, Bulkhead, Mirage, Brawn, Jetfire, Jazz, Sideswipe, and Blaster opt to follow Elita, while Wheeljack, Arcee Magnus, Cliffjumper, Beachcomber, Shredhead, Thundercracker, and the four remaining Aerialbots remain with a devolved Optimus. The Cybertron-bound Autobots take the bodies of Bumblebee and Ratchet with them as they leave, and the Earthbound Autobots resolve to destroy the Decepticons.
=== Volume 6: "Decepticons Attack!" ===
31	Robert Kirkman	Ludo Lullabi	Mike Spicer	April 8, 2026
The Decepticons return to the Nemesis, where Megatron is assailed by another vision of many Dezimirs who rip him apart at the command of their unseen master. Megatron defiantly rejects the master and their gifts, but they retort that he has failed by not submitting and unlocking the full power of the dark Matrix, the Matrix of Oppression. Megatron refuses to yield and is forced to participate in several thousand more trials against Dezimir, hordes of Sharkticons and Allicons, past Decepticon bearers of the Matrix, and the Mechanokoar. After ten thousand trials, Megatron finally surrenders and is brought before the master – Megatronus the Fallen, one of the original Thirteen Primes. Megatron reluctantly yields and pledges himself to serve the Fallen, and the vision ends; in the real world, the Matrix releases a growth of purple crystals that completely encase Megatron's body. The other Decepticons, who had been trying and failing to subdue the possessed Megatron, realize that their leader is undergoing a metamorphosis.
32	Robert Kirkman	Jason Howard	Mike Spicer	May 13, 2026
Elita Prime's team successfully returns to Cybertron, and the space bridge portal explodes behind them. Although they try to sneak out of enemy territory, Shockwave and an army of Decepticons quickly confront them. Bumblebee's body is destroyed in the assault, and a furious Ultra Magnus overcomes his fear to carry the Autobots into battle; however, the Decepticon reinforcements quickly overwhelm them. Desperate, Elita tries calling upon the Matrix's power, and its energy manifests as the ghostly form of the Star Saber. She cuts down and subdues many Decepticons with the weapon's power, giving the injured Autobots time to regroup and retreat. As Elita flees, Shockwave resolves to visit the imprisoned Alpha Trion.
33	Robert Kirkman	Jason Howard	Mike Spicer	June 10, 2026
After the exhausted Elita catches up with the Autobots, they return to their base to find that Springer and Hot Rod have returned from deep space with a shuttle full of Energon (Note: As depicted in Void Rivals #18.). Meanwhile, the Earthbound Autobots and their allies continue to help humanity as they adjust to the new status quo. In particular, Optimus struggles to accept the limitations of his smaller body and the absence of the Matrix's wisdom. He confides in Arcee Magnus, who promises to support him however she can, but also questions whether he and Elita made the right choice in splitting their forces. The Aerialbots and Thundercracker drop Wheeljack off on the Cybertron Shard to scavenge for materials, and Thundercracker warns them of a great evil lurking beneath the planet's surface that the Autobots are not prepared for. As Wheeljack accidentally falls into a pit and makes a discovery, the Decepticons on the Nemesis discover that Starscream's body vanished while cleaning up the remains of Megatron's possessed fury; unbeknownst to them, the still-living Decepticon has dragged himself out of the scrapheap and across the ocean floor to freedom.
34	Robert Kirkman	Jason Howard	Mike Spicer	July 8, 2026
Optimus and Flagg catch one another up on recent events, including the former's new body and Wheeljack's work on rebuilding Chicago into a technological marvel. The Aerialbots agree to help Thundercracker track down Cobra-La as Shredhead and Cliffjumper discover the Combaticons destroying a nearby town. Flagg brings Optimus to the secret laboratory of his former collaborator, Doctor Henri Arkeville; although Arkeville is less than pleased to see Flagg again, he agrees to return to Shadow Watch as its new director upon meeting Optimus. The Combaticons combine into Bruticus and overwhelm Shredhead, severely injuring them; Cliffjumper takes their sword and slices the combiner's head apart, forcing the Combaticons apart and seemingly killing Onslaught. As the remaining Combaticons flee, Cliffjumper finds his friend near death.
35	Robert Kirkman	Jason Howard	Mike Spicer	August 12, 2026
On the Cybertron Shard, Wheeljack completes a prototype of a human-sized Cybertronian exosuit to expedite the Chicago reconstruction project, unaware of Starscream climbing the outside of the structure. As Optimus and Flagg airlift Shredhead and Onslaught's bodies to Shadow Watch's headquarters, Thundercracker leads the Aerialbots into the Himalayas to find an entrance to Cobra-La. The remaining Combaticons report to Soundwave on the Nemesis as the other Autobots regroup at Shadow Watch, where Wheeljack is disgusted to find Arkeville repairing Shredhead with Onslaught's parts. After the Aerialbots split up, Skywarp ambushes Thundercracker; unable to convince his brother to stand down, Thundercracker subdues him with a sonic boom that accidentally triggers an avalanche. Just as everyone digs themselves out of the snow, a mob of Cobra-La Royal Guards attacks them.
36	Robert Kirkman	Jason Howard	Mike Spicer	September 9, 2026
The Royal Guards summon a pair of gigantic Marauder worms to destroy the invaders, and the Aerialbots, together with Thundercracker, recombine into Superion. After killing the worms, both Skywarp and Superion flee, and a furious Golobulus declares that Cobra-La can no longer stay passive against the Cybertronian menace. At Shadow Watch, Flagg grows suspicious of Arkeville's motivations as he and Wheeljack successfully bring a disoriented Shredhead back online. Unbeknownst to the Autobots, Starscream fully repairs himself at the Shard and steals one of Wheeljack's secret projects. The Aerialbots return to the Ark and warn Optimus of the danger Cobra-La poses as Wheeljack's exosuits begin helping the Chicago reconstruction; Arkeville sends Onslaught off Earth on a rocket; and Beachcomber receives a scanner upgrade from Hound and his human ally Clutch (Note: As depicted in G.I. Joe.) to search for the Ark’s missing Autobots. Meanwhile, Skywarp returns to the Nemesis just as Megatron's crystal cocoon begins to open.
2026 Special	Robert Kirkman	Jason Howard	Sarah Stern	May 6, 2026
Somewhere in the jungle, a snake attempts to ambush a miniature young woman drinking water from a river. However, the woman catches the snake and beheads it with her sword. After cooking and eating it, she returns to her shelter inside the body of a giant deactivated robot embedded in the side of a mountain as the sun begins to set.
=== Volume 7: "The Ultimate Doom" ===
37	Robert Kirkman	Karl Kerschl	Mike Spicer	October 14, 2026
On Cybertron, as Shockwave tortures Alpha Trion for the location of the Cybertronian supercomputer Vector Sigma, Elita Prime launches a series of raids to retake the Well of All Sparks. As the Autobots move deeper into Decepticon territory, she flatly rejects Jazz's plea to supply the Earthbound Autobots with Energon, despite his worry that abandoning them will lead to Megatron's ultimate victory. Eventually, when the two armies clash at the Well, Elita is shot by the Decepticon shapeshifter Makeshift, who had secretly replaced the captured Mirage. While unconscious, the Matrix sends Sparky's spirit to speak with her, making her realize that Optimus was right to protect Earth. She awakens to find the Well in Autobot hands and orders Jazz to return to Earth with Jetfire and enough Energon to help Optimus. Meanwhile, in the depths of Cybertron, Shockwave finds and reactivates Vector Sigma.
38	Robert Kirkman	Jason Howard	Mike Spicer	November 11, 2026
The Decepticons watch as the cocoon hatches and reveals a newly upgraded Megatron, who renames himself Megatronus Rex. Wheeljack discovers the theft aboard the Shard – a missing batch of Cybertronian sparks, with only four remaining – while Arcee Magnus gives Carly an exosuit and the Autobots welcome Shredhead back to the Ark. The Decepticons suddenly attack the mountain, and Megatronus challenges Optimus again as another fight breaks out between the two armies. Although Superion saves Optimus, he is beaten down by Devastator, and Megatronus transforms into his new gun mode – a gigantic combiner-sized cannon – to slaughter the Autobots.

== Accolades ==
Year	Award	Category	Nominee	Comic	Result	Ref.
2024	Eisner Awards	Best Continuing Series	Daniel Warren Johnson	Transformers	Won	
2024	Eisner Awards	Best Writer/Artist	Daniel Warren Johnson	Transformers	Won	
2024	ComicBook.com Golden Issue Awards	Best Artist	Jorge Corona	Transformers	Won	

== Collected editions ==
Title	Material collected	Pages	Publication date	ISBN
Trade paperback
Transformers, Volume 1: Robots in Disguise	Transformers #1–6	136	May 7, 2024	ISBN 978-1534398177
Transformers, Volume 2: Transport to Oblivion	Transformers #7–12	128	November 26, 2024	ISBN 978-1534345270
Transformers, Volume 3: Combiner Chaos	Transformers #13–18; Energon Universe 2024 Special (Transformers story)	136	May 27, 2025	ISBN 978-1534325593
Transformers, Volume 4: Conquer and Control	Transformers #19–24; Energon Universe 2025 Special (Transformers story)	144	November 25, 2025	ISBN 978-1534332584
Transformers, Volume 5: Generation One	Transformers #25–30	144	June 2, 2026	ISBN 978-1534333550
Transformers, Volume 6: Decepticons Attack!	Transformers #31–36	128	November 11, 2026	ISBN 978-1534332638
Transformers, Volume 7: The Ultimate Doom	Transformers #37-42	128	June 8, 2027	ISBN 978-1534349711
Deluxe
Transformers: Deluxe Edition, Book 1	Transformers #1–12	296	April 30, 2025	ISBN 978-1534328235
Transformers: Deluxe Edition, Book 2	Transformers #13–24; Energon Universe 2024 Special (Transformers story); Energon Universe 2025 Special (Transformers story)	288	May 26, 2026	ISBN 978-1534330481
Transformers: Deluxe Edition, Book 3	Transformers #25–36	280	May 25, 2027	ISBN 978-1534359703

== See also ==
- Energon Universe (comics)
- Transformers (Skybound Entertainment)
