= G.I. Joe (Skybound Entertainment) =

American comic book line

- G.I. Joe (2024) issue #1, cover A (extended).

Publication information
- Publisher: Skybound Entertainment (Image Comics)
- Publication date: November 15, 2023 – present
- Editors: Ben Abernathy; Sean Mackiewicz; Jonathan Manning

G.I. Joe is an ongoing line of American comic books published by Image Comics and Skybound Entertainment based on Hasbro's G.I. Joe franchise by Stanley Weston and Donald Levine.

It is a successor of IDW Publishing's previous relaunch of G.I. Joe comics.

== Publication history ==
After IDW Publishing lost the licenses to produce Transformers and G.I. Joe comics by the end of 2022, Hasbro announced in June 2023 that Skybound Entertainment, an imprint of Image Comics, would acquire those licenses.

Since November 2023, Skybound began publishing four limited series of the Energon Universe franchise, as well as continuing IDW's A Real American Hero series, which originated from Marvel Comics.

During San Diego Comic-Con 2023, it was revealed that Skybound has plans to reprint both the Marvel and IDW comics based on G.I. Joe, with more info set to release later.

== List of continuities ==
=== A Real American Hero ===
G.I. Joe: A Real American Hero is an ongoing series written by Larry Hama, drawn by Chris Mooneyham and colored by Francesco Segala, which continues the run left in the Marvel and IDW series, starting with issue #301.

Hama said, "I am delighted to be continuing the saga of G.I. Joe with the good folks at Skybound and totally amped to be taking the G.I. Joe team to issue #301 and beyond. Little did I know back in 1982 that I would be associated with the Real American Hero for over 40 years. My thanks to the whole crew at Skybound for allowing me to continue to chronicle the exploits of characters who have become like a family to me.”

=== Energon Universe ===
Duke issue #1, cover A.

Starting in December 2023, Skybound began publishing four limited series set in the Energon Universe, starting with Duke and Cobra Commander, being written by Joshua Williamsonn, with art and colors by Tom Reilly, Andrea Milana, Jordie Bellaire and Annalisa Leoni, respectively.

Williamson said the series offered a new take on Duke and the formation of G.I. Joe that would honor the characters while taking them in a new direction, and said he had been collecting the "G.I. Joe Classified" figures in the years beforehand.

In October 2023, Skybound announced that the main roster of G.I. Joe features Duke, Hawk, Stalker and Baroness, while the main roster of Cobra features Cobra Commander, Destro, Zarana and Mercer.

In March 2024, Skybound announced the last two of the four initial limited series: Scarlett, written by Kelly Thompson, drawn by Marco Ferrari and colored by Lee Loughridge; and Destro, written by Dan Watters, drawn by Andrei Bressan and colored by Adriano Lucas.

Thompson said, “I'm fortunate that, thanks to my job, I often get to dig into characters and worlds that I’ve loved for a long time, but G.I. Joe's Scarlett is truly one of my first geek loves as a kid, and I am absolutely thrilled to have a hand in building her for this new, incredibly cool and rich universe at Skybound.”

Watters added, “I'm incredibly excited to bring Destro to life with Andrei. This is going to be a visceral, explosive thriller in which he [Destro] isn't very nice to anyone at all — everything you'd want from your favorite amoral arms trafficker.”

As announced in the Energon Universe 2024 Special, a new ongoing G.I. Joe series in being planned for development, being a direct continuation of the Duke, Cobra Commander, Scarlett and Destro limited series. The series will feature the Duke creative team, with Williamson returning as writer, Reilly as illustrator, and Bellaire as colorist. The first issue debuted on November 13, 2024.

=== Cold Slither ===
Cold Slither is a one-shot issue written by Tim Seeley, drawn by Juann Cabal, colored by Rex Lokus, and lettered by Pat Brosseau, being published on October 1, 2025. The issue features the fictional band Cold Slither, which is based on Cobra's Dreadnok faction, and is set in a modern version of the shared continuity between the animated series G.I. Joe: A Real American Hero, The Transformers, Jem and Inhumanoids.

Seeley said, “The catchiest song ever to grace a military-themed toy line has lived in my head rent-free for forty years, so I’m happy to drag it out and write the true story of the scrappy band of miscreants who recorded it.”

Cabal added, “My parents met at a Cold Slither gig back in the ’80s, so getting to draw this one-shot has been really special for me.”

Ben Abernathy, executive editor at Skybound, also added, “To say this face-melting issue was a labor of love is an understatement. Getting this motley crew of creators together for this incisive and heartfelt look at the rise and fall of the legendary Cold Slither was a heavy metal dream come true!”

Additionally, Hasbro and Reigning Phoenix Music presented a concert in San Diego’s Brick by Brick festival (July 24), featuring Gus Rios as Zartan (vocals/bass), Ross Sewage as Torch (guitar), Matt Harvey as Ripper (guitar), and Andy Selway as Buzzer (drums).

=== The Island of Dr. Mindbender (Skybound Visions) ===
Title	Issues	Writer	Artist	Inker	Colorist	Premiere date	Finale date
G.I. Joe: The Island of Dr. Mindbender	5	Karl Kerschl	Doug Mahnke	Jaime Mendoza	David Baron	February 2, 2027	TBA

== Accolades ==
Year	Award	Category	Nominee	Comic	Result	Ref.
2024	ComicBook.com Golden Issue Awards	Best Colorirst	Jordie Bellaire	G.I. Joe	Nominated	
2025	Eisner Awards	Best Coloring	Jordie Bellaire	Duke, G.I. Joe	Won	
2025	Eisner Awards	Best Writer	Kelly Thompson	Scarlett	Nominated	

== See also ==
- G.I. Joe (IDW Publishing)
