= Transformers (Skybound Entertainment) =

American comic book line

- Cover A for Transformers (2023) #1.

Publication information
- Publisher: Skybound Entertainment (Image Comics)
- Genre: Science fiction
- Publication date: October 4, 2023 – present
- No. of issues: 37 (as of October 2026)
- Main characters: Optimus Prime; Megatron; Elita One; Starscream; Spike Witwicky
- Editors: Ben Abernathy; Sean Mackiewicz

Transformers is an ongoing line of American comic books published by Image Comics and Skybound Entertainment, based on the Transformers franchise by Hasbro and TakaraTomy. It is a successor of IDW Publishing's previous relaunch of Transformers comics.

== History ==
After IDW Publishing lost the licenses to produce Transformers and G.I. Joe comics by the end of 2022, Hasbro announced in June 2023 that Skybound Entertainment, an imprint of Image Comics, would acquire those licenses.

During San Diego Comic-Con 2023, it was revealed that Skybound has plans to reprint both the Marvel and IDW comics based on Transformers, with more info set to release later.

In April 2025, Skybound opened a crowdfunding project on Kickstarter to release volumes 1–4 of the Transformers Compendium Set, which include the original comic series from the Marvel era. The project was successfully funded in 2 minutes.

== List of continuities ==
=== Energon Universe ===
Skybound's first Transformers comic is set in the Energon Universe, being initially written and drawn by Daniel Warren Johnson, and colored by Mike Spicer, and debuted on October 4, 2023.

In June 2023, Skybound announced that the main roster of Autobots features Optimus Prime, Arcee, Cliffjumper, Wheeljack and Ratchet, while the main roster of Decepticons features Starscream, Soundwave, Laserbeak, Rumble and Skywarp.

In January 2024, it was announced that Jorge Corona would serve as the new artist of the series starting with issue #7, with Johnson staying as writer for the series.

In June 2025, Void Rivals writer and Energon Universe showrunner Robert Kirkman announced he would become the new leading writer, starting from issue #25 on October 8, 2025.

=== Worst Bot Ever (Skybound Comet) ===
In August 2024, Skybound announced a new graphic novel series titled Transformers: Worst Bot Ever for the Skybound Comet imprint for young readers. This series features a new character named Ballpoint, a small pen-like Decepticon who wants to prove his worth.

Title	Writer(s)	Artist(s)	Release schedules		
Title	Writer(s)	Artist(s)	Free Comic Book Day preview	Print edition	Digital edition
Transformers: Worst Bot Ever — Meet Ballpoint	Brian “Smitty” Smith	Marz Jr.	May 3, 2025	July 9, 2025	July 22, 2025
Transformers: Worst Bot Ever — Bot Swap!	Brian “Smitty” Smith	Marz Jr.	—N/a	June 17, 2026	July 14, 2026

=== Bumblebee (Skybound Visions) ===
Title	Issues	Writer	Artist	Colorist	Premiere date	Finale date
Transformers: Bumblebee — Lost Planet	5	Tate Brombal	Matt Emmons	Giovanna Niro	January 27, 2027	TBA

== Reprints ==
Title	Issues	Writer(s)	Artist(s)	Colorist(s)	Premiere date	Finale date
The Transformers #1 40th Anniversary Edition	One-shot	Bill Mantlo and Ralph Macchio	Frank Springer and Kim DeMulder	Nel Yomtov	August 28, 2024	
The Transformers: The Movie 40th Anniversary Edition	3	Ralph Macchio	Don Perlin (pencils) and Brian Garvey & Ian Akin (ink)	Nel Yomtov	June 3, 2023	August 5, 2026

== Accolades ==
Year	Award	Category	Nominee	Comic	Result	Ref.
2024	Eisner Awards	Best Continuing Series	Daniel Warren Johnson	Transformers	Won	
2024	Eisner Awards	Best Writer/Artist	Daniel Warren Johnson	Transformers	Won	
2024	ComicBook.com Golden Issue Awards	Best Artist	Jorge Corona	Transformers	Won	

== Collected editions ==
=== Energon Universe ===
Title	Material collected	Pages	Publication date	ISBN
Trade paperback
Transformers, Volume 1: Robots in Disguise	Transformers #1–6	136	May 7, 2024	ISBN 978-1534398177
Transformers, Volume 2: Transport to Oblivion	Transformers #7–12	128	November 26, 2024	ISBN 978-1534345270
Transformers, Volume 3: Combiner Chaos	Transformers #13–18; Energon Universe 2024 Special (Transformers story)	136	May 27, 2025	ISBN 978-1534325593
Transformers, Volume 4: Conquer and Control	Transformers #19–24; Energon Universe 2025 Special (Transformers story)	144	November 25, 2025	ISBN 978-1534332584
Transformers, Volume 5: Generation One	Transformers #25-30	144	June 2, 2026	ISBN 978-1534333550
Transformers, Volume 6: Decepticons Attack!	Transformers #31-36	128	November 11, 2026	ISBN 978-1534332638
Deluxe
Transformers: Deluxe Edition, Book 1	Transformers #1–12	296	April 30, 2025	ISBN 978-1534328235
Transformers: Deluxe Edition, Book 2	Transformers #13-24; Energon Universe 2024 Special (Transformers story); Energon Universe 2025 Special (Transformers story)	288	May 26, 2026	ISBN 978-1534330481

=== The Transformers Compendium ===
Title	Material collected	Pages	Publication date	ISBN
Marvel Comics era
The Transformers Compendium, Volume 1	The Transformers #1–44; The Transformers: Headmasters #1–4	1064	April 22, 2025	ISBN 978-1534373679
The Transformers Compendium, Volume 2	The Transformers #45–80; The Transformers: The Movie #1–3; Transformers: Generation 2 #1–12	1208	October 21, 2025	ISBN 978-1534331976
Marvel UK era
The Transformers UK Compendium, Volume 1	The Transformers UK #9–21, #29–32, #41–50, #59–65, #74–88, #96–104, #113–120, #125, #131–138; The Transformers UK AF #24–27; The Transformers UK Annual 1985/1986/1987	1064	February 24, 2026	ISBN 978-1534330597
The Transformers UK Compendium, Volume 2	The Transformers UK #143–153, #160-161, #164–173, #180–189, #198–205, #213–289; The Transformers UK Generation 2 #1-2; The Transformers UK Annual 1988/1989/1990/1991/1992	1208	October 21, 2025	ISBN 978-1534334472

=== Other ===
Title	Material collected	Pages	Publication date	ISBN
The Transformers: The Movie Deluxe Edition	The Transformers: The Movie (Marvel) #1–3; The Transformers: The Animated Movie (IDW) #1–4	168	August 12, 2026	TBA

== See also ==
- Transformers comics
  - The Transformers (Marvel Comics)
  - The Transformers (IDW Publishing)
