= Void Rivals =

American sci-fi comic book series

- Cover of Void Rivals #1, art by Lorenzo De Felici

Publication information
- Publisher: Skybound Entertainment (Image Comics)
- Schedule: Monthly
- Format: Ongoing series
- Genre: Science fiction
- Publication date: June 14, 2023 – present
- No. of issues: 35 (as of October 2026)
- Main characters: Darak; Solila; Rodimus; Springer; Quintessons; Cobra-La

Creative team
- Created by: Lorenzo De Felici; Robert Kirkman; Matheus Lopes
- Written by: Robert Kirkman
- Artist(s): Lorenzo De Felici; Conor Hughes
- Letterer: Rus Wooton
- Colorist(s): Patricio Delpeche; Matheus Lopes
- Editor(s): Ben Abernathy; Sean Mackiewicz; Jonathan Manning; Bixie Mathieu

Void Rivals is an American science fiction comic book series written by Robert Kirkman, drawn by Lorenzo De Felici, and published by Image Comics and Skybound Entertainment. The story follows Darak and Solila, two individuals from opposing sides of an ancient extraterrestrial racial war, whose ships crash on a barren planet, forcing them to cooperate for survival.

In publication since June 2023, Void Rivals is the first installment (and only wholly original intellectual property) in the Energon Universe, a shared universe that combines new Transformers and G.I. Joe comics developed by Skybound, in collaboration with Hasbro.

== Premise ==
The Sacred Ring is a massive, disk-like artificial structure that encircles a black hole located in a desolate quadrant of space. This black hole draws in resources such as comets and other celestial bodies towards itself and the ring. On either side of the Ring reside two once-united worlds, Agorria and Zertonia. Both were once thriving planets whose societies fractured into opposing races after their parent star collapsed. They then spent thousands of years and generations building and assembling their respective halves of the Sacred Ring around the black hole, in a desperate struggle to survive.

The remnants of each world now inhabit their halves of the Ring and are locked in a bitter, racial hate-driven conflict, fighting over resources and trying to sustain their struggling civilizations. After a battle in outer space over a large asteroid of frozen water, two survivors—one from each race, find themselves stranded on a barren dwarf planet. They are then forced to work together to find a way off the lifeless rock, or die there. As they navigate their challenges, they uncover a troubling truth: their war has been perpetuated by a cycle of secrets and lies. In reality, the Agorrians and Zertonians are the same species, but powerful parties on both sides want to keep them divided.

== Publication history ==
Void Rivals was announced in February 2023 as the beginning of an "all-new shared universe" developed by Skybound Entertainment and Image Comics. The series is being written by Robert Kirkman, drawn by Lorenzo De Felici and colored by Matheus Lopes. Kirkman and De Felici had previously worked together on another comic titled Oblivion Song.

Kirkman said, "With every project I do, I'm always trying to challenge myself. One thing I've always loved doing is starting small with a story and expanding the depth, scope and stakes as we progress. With Void Rivals we'll be going bigger than I ever have and at a much faster pace. This project is going to be monumental. I can't wait for people to see what Lorenzo and I have been cooking."

Sean Mackiewicz, publisher and SVP for Skybound Entertainment, also added, "Void Rivals takes every element fans expect from Skybound comics—incredible worlds, dynamic characters, and jaw-dropping twists—and kicks off our first shared universe. This comic is the start of something we'll be talking about for years to come."

By the time the first issue was published on June 14, 2023, Skybound announced the series to be part of the Energon Universe, which combines new comics based on Hasbro brands Transformers and G.I. Joe.

== Overview ==
Volume	Title	Issues	First released	Last released	Writer	Artists	Colorists
1	"More than Meets the Eye"	6	June 14, 2023	November 22, 2023	Robert Kirkman	Lorenzo De Felici	Matheus Lopes; Patricio Delpeche
2	"Hunted Across the Wasteland"	6 + 2024 Special	May 4, 2024	August 28, 2024	Robert Kirkman	Lorenzo De Felici	Matheus Lopes; Patricio Delpeche
3	"The Key to Vector Theta"	6	October 23, 2024	April 30, 2025	Robert Kirkman	Lorenzo De Felici	Patricio Delpeche
4	"First Chosen"	6	May 3, 2025	November 5, 2025	Robert Kirkman	Conor Hughes	Patricio Delpeche
5	"Quintesson War"	6 + 2025 Special	December 24, 2025	May 27, 2026	Robert Kirkman	Andrei Bressan	Patricio Delpeche; Dee Cunniffe
6	"Rom"	6 + Rom Special + 2026 Special	May 2, 2026	November 25, 2026	Robert Kirkman	Conor Hughes	Matheus Lopes; Patricio Delpeche
7	"Pit of Destruction"	6	December 23, 2026	TBA	Robert Kirkman	Frank Mazzoli	Patricio Delpeche

== Plot ==
Issue	Written by	Drawn by	Colored by	Publication date
=== Volume 1: "More than Meets the Eye" ===
01	Robert Kirkman	Lorenzo De Felici	Matheus Lopes	June 14, 2023
The Agorrian pilot Darak crashlands after battling with an enemy Zertonian ship on a remote planetoid far from the Sacred Ring, their shared home. After Darak's artificial intelligence assistant, Handroid, revives him, Solila, the Zertonian pilot, ambushes them. Darak spares her on the condition that they work together to repair one of their ships and return to the Ring, to which Solila and Handroid reluctantly agree. During the repairs, Solila is nearly killed when she accidentally detonates part of their energy supply, and she leaves in a huff after Darak saves her. She returns several hours later with news of another spacecraft buried nearby, which Handroid confirms is neither Agorrian nor Zertonian. Darak and Solila attempt to reactivate the ship but are astonished when it suddenly transforms into the Cybertronian scientist Jetfire; horrified at his eons-long slumber, Jetfire leaves them behind to return to Cybertron. (Note: As continued in Transformers #1.) Darak suggests salvaging parts from their flight armor to re-repair Solila's ship, which would mean removing their helmets and violating their people's most sacred traditions. Solila agrees, and they discover to their shock that they are actually the same race beneath their helmets, as foretold in a mysterious vision Darak had.
02	Robert Kirkman	Lorenzo De Felici	Matheus Lopes	July 19, 2023
Darak tells Solila about the vision he experienced after leaving Agorria on a mission from his leader, Minister Dulin, which detailed the history of the Sacred Ring – Agorria and Zertonia were once two warring planets whose populations united after their sun collapsed, and the Sacred Ring was built to contain the black hole. The surviving Agorrians and Zertonians each took half of the Ring, but the peace soon broke down, and the conflict resumed fiercer than ever. However, the vision warns that unity must happen again soon as "Goliant" is coming. Solila believes the voice in Darak's vision belonged to the Zertonian religious figure Zerta, despite his skepticism; nonetheless, both agree that they should continue working together to return to the Sacred Ring and uncover the truth behind their war. The two spend the next twenty days crafting a patchwork shuttle out of the remaining materials despite Solila's conflicted feelings over her new relationship with a supposedly sworn enemy. The shuttle finally takes off, but Handroid informs Darak and Solila that they will take years to return to the Ring. However, they are soon captured by an asteroid-shaped spaceship and its pilot, the bounty hunter Skuxxoid.
03	Robert Kirkman	Lorenzo De Felici	Matheus Lopes	August 16, 2023
Darak and Solila escape the Skuxxoid and flee deeper into his ship, the Rockerroid, and he opts to inspect their shuttle rather than pursue them. Solila fends off a strange mechanical scorpion, and Darak realizes she is actually a Zertonian warrior, not a mere pilot as she previously claimed. Against Solila's warnings, Darak releases another of the Skuxxoid's alien prisoners in exchange for passage off the ship, and they return to the main hangar. The Skuxxoid confronts them and reveals the prisoner is a Quintesson, offering them another deal – in exchange for the Quintesson and their junker shuttle, Darak and Solila can leave using a different ship. The two accept, to the Quintesson's dismay, and they return to the borders of the Sacred Ring within a few days. They agree to split up and continue investigating within their own people, but Solila betrays Darak and knocks him out.
04	Robert Kirkman	Lorenzo De Felici	Matheus Lopes	September 27, 2023
Solila returns to Zertonia with the captured Darak, narrowly fending off an attack from Handroid. As Zertonian leader Premier Zalilak is informed of their arrival, Solila apologizes to her new frenemy and agrees to keep their discoveries secret until they can reconnect and figure out whom to trust. Zertonian guards arrest Darak as the Skuxxoid attempts to sell his Quintesson prisoner on Cybertron, but he is turned away by the Decepticon Shockwave. Zalilak informs Solila that Darak will be kept alive for leverage and immediately becomes suspicious of her relief. She is arrested and thrown in the same cell as Darak, who finds their shared imprisonment hilarious despite the revelation that their leaders are both in on the larger conspiracy. Zalilak secretly removes his helmet and contacts Minister Dulin to inform him of the situation; even though he is Darak's father, Dulin reluctantly allows Zalilak to proceed with his judgments.
05	Robert Kirkman	Lorenzo De Felici	Patricio Delpeche	October 25, 2023
Darak is taken away for interrogation as Solila is visited by Mistress Vil and the Keepers of the Light, a mysterious religious sect that Solila abandoned to become a pilot. Vil gives Solila advice for her upcoming quest and a strange green key bearing both Agorrian and Zertonian markings. At the same time, the Skuxxoid tries to return his prisoner to the Quintesson home planet of Quintessa. The five-faced Quintesson Judge is furious at the Skuxxoid's insolence and orders the Allicon horde to execute him, but pauses when the Skuxxoid offers them the Zertonian shuttle. Darak endures three days of torture before a young child named Ultum rescues him and returns his clothes, helmet, and Handroid. Ultum brings him to the Unifiers, a group of Zertonian resistance fighters dedicated to reconnecting the two halves of the Sacred Ring, and Darak requests that they retrieve Solila as well.
06	Robert Kirkman	Lorenzo De Felici	Matheus Lopes	November 22, 2023
The Unifiers reluctantly agree and rescue Solila as the Quintessons take Darak and Solila's shuttle; the Judge orders the ship scanned for any information on Zertonia's whereabouts, musing about how a mysterious "her" must have succeeded eons ago. Solila is surprised that Darak helped engineer her escape, and the Unifiers request the two deliver a data packet to their counterparts on Agorria, with whom they recently lost contact. Zalilak is notified of Darak and Solila's escape as they venture into the destitute Zertonian public, but Ultum betrays them in of hopes that the Zertonian guards will help him find his mother. Darak and Solila flee and eventually escape into the desolate Wastelands separating the two halves of the Sacred Ring. However, Zalilak refuses to risk the Sacred Ring reuniting and the coming of Goliant and orders Proximus, their most terrible hunter, to be revived.
=== Volume 2: "Hunted Across the Wasteland" ===
2024 Special	Robert Kirkman	Lorenzo De Felici	Matheus Lopes	May 4, 2024
The Skuxxoid finally reunites with his longtime bounty-hunting partner Slizardo, who threatens to shoot him for abandoning him. He manages to calm Slizardo down after telling him about his misadventures with the Quintessons. Although Slizardo is interested in hearing more, the conversation is interrupted by the Autobot Hot Rod, who is also keen to learn more about the Zertonian ship the Quintessons confiscated. After Hot Rod threatens the bickering bounty hunters not to impede his search for a missing ally, the Skuxxoid agrees to cooperate and gives him all the information he had on the ship, where he discovered it, and the trajectory its former pilots took after leaving. A satisfied Hot Rod leaves, and the Skuxxoid decides to return home, unaware that a mysterious robotic figure was recording the meeting.
07	Robert Kirkman	Lorenzo De Felici	Matheus Lopes	March 6, 2024
In the past, Darak was once a construction worker tasked with maintaining the edge of Agorria. After he saved a fellow worker from an accident, the intense gravity at the Sacred Ring's edge threw him off Agorria into the middle of the Wastelands. Relying on hazy memories of his survival, Darak maintains that they need to make it halfway across the blasted landscape; despite Solila and Handroid's reservations about not having enough supplies for a three-month journey, they agree to follow his lead. Zalilak mentally contacts Proximus, whose ruined body is sealed inside a life support tank, and orders him to hunt down Darak and Solila before they reach Agorria. Proximus agrees, and the Zertonian scientists release him and reassemble his body using cybernetic limbs. Solila continues to press Darak about his vision, maintaining that it was a message from Zerta, while Darak believes it was a mere hallucination brought on by the stresses of space travel. Later that night, Solila secretly examines the key Mistress Vil gave her, who senses that she is on the destiny chosen by Zerta.
08	Robert Kirkman	Lorenzo De Felici	Patricio Delpeche	April 2, 2024
In the past, Solila's mother sold her and her younger brother Polada into the Zertonian military, where their new superior officers were impressed by their ferocious fighting. In response to Solila's continued questioning about their destination, Darak admits he vaguely remembers where to find an oasis in the center of the Wastelands. The two are suddenly beset by a rain of energy arrows as Proximus catches up to them. Darak is immediately knocked out, and Handroid distracts the hunter long enough for Solila to stab him with her spear. The Wastelands' high winds scatter the three combatants, and Proximus hurls Solila's spear after the rivals. When Darak wakes up, he finds that Proximus is gone, but he also discovers that his spear throw managed to impale Solila.
09	Robert Kirkman	Lorenzo De Felici	Patricio Delpeche	May 22, 2024
Although the spear missed Solila's vital organs, she refuses to remove it for fear of bleeding out; the two continue their trek towards the oasis, now much closer than before thanks to the winds. The Skuxxoid returns home to see his family but suddenly remembers that they are no longer around, as Solila faints from blood loss and Darak finally finds the oasis – a small shelter containing a green and yellow alien vehicle. Darak admits to Handroid that he doesn't remember anything else about the oasis, only that someone there returned him to Agorria, but is interrupted when the vehicle suddenly transforms into the Autobot Springer. Springer initially confuses them for other mechanical beings and agrees to help, but Proximus suddenly returns and attacks the triple-changing Autobot. While tending to an unconscious Solila, Darak discovers the mysterious green key. Meanwhile, a Quintesson Scientist reports his findings to the Judge – the shuttle's alloys date back to ancient Cybertron, and Zertonia might be connected to their ancient enemy, Zerta Trion.
10	Robert Kirkman	Lorenzo De Felici	Patricio Delpeche	June 26, 2024
Zalilak is forced to admit to Dulin that the two prisoners escaped, while Solila awakens for long enough to scold Darak for inspecting the key. Springer eventually subdues Proximus and takes Darak and Solila to a laboratory underneath the oasis, where he realizes that the gems on Darak and Solila's foreheads are actually Energon ports. After Springer pours some of his Energon into Solila's gem, she begins to glow pink as her body absorbs it and receives a vision from Zerta, telling her she must journey into the Sacred Ring and find her. A fascinated Springer explains that although the Agorrians and Zertonians are organic, their physiologies somehow contain synthetic Cybertronian materials; furthermore, the Sacred Ring is actually a massive Energon-producing machine, which the Cybertronians require for food and fuel. He also tells the two about how he left the civil war between the Autobots and Decepticons to look for the mythical Cybertronian Zerta Trion. Solila asks to hear everything about Zerta Trion, but they are interrupted as a heavily armed squadron of Zertonian soldiers arrives at the oasis.
11	Robert Kirkman	Lorenzo De Felici	Patricio Delpeche	July 24, 2024
The Wastelands' gravity proves too strong to allow Darak and Solila to escape with Springer, and the three decide to fight back against the Zertonians. During the battle, Darak manages to find and repair the old construction exosuit he used during his last visit to the Wastelands, which turns the tide. Before the Zertonians retreat, he asks Springer to give one of the soldiers information about Energon production and refinement, admitting to a shocked Solila that he no longer cares about sides and just wants to help all their people. The Skuxxoid meets with a new client on the planet Chaar, unaware that a mysterious robotic figure is spying on him, as a Quintesson cruiser begins sweeping the asteroid field where the Skuxxoid found Darak and Solila's ship. Hot Rod also arrives to search for Springer, and the Quintessons follow him as he sets course for the Sacred Ring. An injured Proximus stows away on one of the Zertonian tanks as they leave the Wastelands, while Darak asks Springer to take him and Solila to Agorria and share his knowledge about Energon. Although he agrees, Solila reluctantly tells Darak she cannot go with him and must leave on her own quest.
12	Robert Kirkman	Lorenzo De Felici	Patricio Delpeche	August 28, 2024
Zalilak meets with Dulin again and requests that he prevent unity in his stead; as he departs, he instructs Zertonian scientists to ensure all of the miraculous information received from the Wastelands regarding Energon is true before proceeding. Proximus is discovered hiding in a Zertonian alleyway by Ultum, who was kicked out of the Unifiers for his betrayal and forced to become an army cadet. Ultum admits his mother is most likely dead, and Proximus reluctantly allows him to stay and hide with him. The Skuxxoid completes his latest job, but mournfully reflects on his current place in life as Solila prepares to leave on her search for Zerta Trion. Although Darak understands the need to separate to unite the Sacred Ring, he gives her Handroid so she does not have to travel alone. Solila presses her forehead against Darak's, connecting their gems as the two say goodbye; however, they are unaware that the connection briefly awoke an enormous mechanical figure with glowing green eyes, slumbering inside the black hole at the center of the Sacred Ring.
=== Volume 3: "The Key to Vector Theta" ===
13	Robert Kirkman	Lorenzo De Felici	Patricio Delpeche	October 23, 2024
Pythona of Cobra-La awakens from a nightmare in which she failed her leader Golobulus to find that the Energon signature she and her team of Royal Guards – Vipria, Bola, Akronus, and Grakula – have tracked through deep space (Note: As depicted in Cobra Commander #5.) has led them to a small planetoid. They discover the evidence of Darak and Solila's escape and depart to trace the new signal, hoping it will eventually lead them to Cybertron. As Darak and Springer leave for Agorria, Solila descends into the Sacred Ring's cramped interior despite Handroid's doubts that a Cybertronian like Zerta Trion could fit inside. Darak tells Springer about his encounter with Jetfire while Zalilak meets Mistress Vil at the Temple of Zerta's Light. At the Agorrian capital, Darak has a cold reunion with Dulin, who rebuffs his son's pleas to stop the war and warns that unifying the Sacred Ring would actually destroy them all. Vil echoes these warnings to Zalilak but also states that unity would bring both an end and a new beginning.
14	Robert Kirkman	Lorenzo De Felici	Patricio Delpeche	November 27, 2024
A humbled Zalilak agrees to follow Vil's teachings as Dulin apologizes for concealing the ramifications of unity from Darak. Before he can explain fully, they are interrupted by alerts of an alien vessel approaching Agorria, and Darak agrees to investigate. The Skuxxoid seemingly forgets about his family's departure as Bola and Grakula find a strange green crystal interfering with their Leviathan bioship's tracking abilities. Although they remove it, they fail to notice small growths appearing on their armor from the crystal's energy. Solila uses Vil's key to guide her through the Ring's interior, while Darak receives a new Handroid and again falls unconscious while jumping into deep space. Instead of experiencing another vision, he psychically connects with Solila and the two update each other on recent developments, with Solila especially shocked to learn that Dulin and Zalilak know the truth about unity. Darak wakes up to find himself on a collision course with the alien vessel; the two pilots apologize after a short skirmish, and the other identifies himself as Hot Rod. Solila drops further into the depths of the Ring after she awakens, while the Quintessons following Hot Rod's trail arrive at the Ring.
15	Robert Kirkman	Lorenzo De Felici	Patricio Delpeche	December 26, 2024
The Quintessons quickly leave to plan their revenge as Pythona notices growths on her soldiers' armor, but the Skuxxoid suddenly captures their ship before she can investigate further. Darak returns to Agorria with Hot Rod, where the sudden appearance of Springer and the Cybertronians' size alarms Dulin and the Agorrians. Solila and Handroid are caught and saved by glowing green energy, which she attributes to Zerta, as the key continues to guide them through the darkness. As Springer and Hot Rod reconnect about Zerta Trion and the Ring's Energon production capabilities. Darak assures his skeptical father that the Autobots would make valuable allies. Darak also realizes that Dulin's aide, Elander, is one of the Agorrian Unifiers; meanwhile, in Zertonia, Ultum helps Proximus reconstruct his mechanical body. Solila finally discovers an opening for the key, which reactivates the ancient Cybertronian supercomputer Vector Theta.
16	Robert Kirkman	Lorenzo De Felici	Patricio Delpeche	January 22, 2025
The Skuxxoid's awe at his new find is quickly replaced with irritation when he is attacked by the Cobra-La soldiers. Although he seemingly kills Akronus, he is eventually overwhelmed and cut in half by the rest of them. Unable to risk encountering more dangers inside the Rockerroid, the remaining Cobra-La Guards depart to continue their mission, unaware that their fallen comrade is still alive. Within the Sacred Ring, Vector Theta confirms that Solila will find Zerta Trion at the end of her path, then orders her to leave and deactivates again. Elander confides in Darak that the Unifiers believe he will usher in a new age for the Sacred Realm, but Dulin arrives and arrests them both. Solila eventually reaches another sheer cliff and, before jumping into the darkness again, notices the still-living Zerta Trion before her.
17	Robert Kirkman	Lorenzo De Felici	Patricio Delpeche	March 12, 2025
The weakened Zerta psychically reveals the true origin of the Sacred Ring – long ago, during the Age of Wrath on Cybertron, she was once known as Beta. Alongside her companion A-3, she led a massive rebellion against their Quintesson overlords, for which they were given the honorable titles of Zerta Trion and Alpha Trion. In a desperate last resort, the Quintessons sent their ultimate superweapon Goliant, a monstrous planet-sized machine, to destroy the Cybertronians. Zerta lured him away from Cybertron to a distant star, and she convinced the inhabitants of the two planets orbiting the star to build the Sacred Ring around him as he feasted. Goliant was trapped inside the resulting black hole, and Zerta used his essence to generate Energon and create the Agorrian and Zertonian races. Zerta informs Solila that the Agorrians and Zertonians must unite to free Goliant and defeat him at his weakest, lest he should regain his strength and escape. At the same time, Dulin insists that Goliant must be contained at all costs, but he agrees to spare Darak and be more honest with him. Springer and Hot Rod help the Agorrians build an Energon well while the Cobra-La group comes across the Quintesson cruiser and decides to follow it. In Zertonia, Proximus defeats several groups of soldiers while searching for information about Ultum's mother, but grows suspicious that more were not sent to stop them. One of the soldiers reveals that Zalilak has been missing for months; he is undergoing a series of secret trials at Mistress Vil's command, who believes that he may be the first Zertonian chosen one.
18	Robert Kirkman	Lorenzo De Felici	Patricio Delpeche	April 30, 2025
In Zalilak's absence, Proximus takes command of Zertonia. Dulin tells Darak about how the Agorrian sacred texts warn against reuniting to free Goliant, and he reluctantly accepts the deceit to reconcile with his father. Deep underground, Zerta reactivates Vector Theta, and the irritated supercomputer grants Solila the power to command the structure of the Sacred Ring itself. With her new abilities and upgraded armor, she leaves to find Darak, who visits Elander and learns that the Zertonian Unifiers were able to construct an Energon well of their own based on Springer's data. Darak reiterates the benefits of Energon to a skeptical Dulin while Hot Rod catches Springer up on news from Cybertron, including Elita One's strict Energon rationing and the continued disappearance of Optimus Prime and the Ark (Note: As depicted in Transformers.). With no word from Zalilak, Dulin decides to send Darak on a recon mission to Zertonia, but Solila suddenly bursts from the ground in the center of Dulin's throne room. The two rivals happily reunite, but an apoplectic Dulin orders Darak to kill Solila.
=== Volume 4: "First Chosen" ===
2025 Special	Robert Kirkman	Conor Hughes	Patricio Delpeche	May 3, 2025
On the planet Quintessa, the Quintessons have inexplicably halted all executions, giving a group of prisoners enough time to escape. In their chambers, a group of Quintesson Judges discuss the recent discovery of the Sacred Ring. One of the Judges proposes sending a war fleet to conquer the Ring and retrieve Goliant, but they are interrupted by news of the escaping prisoners. The Judge orders the Sharkticon horde to be sent after them, and the prisoners' leader, the Cybertronian Wheelie, helps fend off several Sharkticons as the Judges return to their discussion. They agree that Goliant remains their best defense against an unnamed cosmic threat and officially declare war on the Sacred Ring.
19	Robert Kirkman	Conor Hughes	Patricio Delpeche	May 28, 2025
A group of Junkions board the Skuxxoid's ship and discover that the two halves of the alien's bisected body are each regenerating into a new Skuxxoid. Their leader, Wreck-Gar, brings both Skuxxoids and the ship back to their home planet of Junkion, where the two aliens awaken. The older, top-half Skuxxoid explains to his younger bottom-half counterpart that neither of them is the original Skuxxoid, with whom they share their memories and personalities. Every time a Skuxxoid is significantly injured, the maimed pieces regrow into a new version of themselves. As the two Skuxxoids take stock of their surroundings, they are attacked by Akronus, who stowed away on the Junkions' ship for revenge. The Junkions force Akronus to surrender, who explains to the confused Skuxxoids that their speech is somehow littered with phrases and terminology from television, a forbidden technology from his homeworld. Suddenly, a mysterious robotic figure attacks and kidnaps the two Skuxxoids, bringing them to a horde of other Skuxxoids led by the original Skuxxoid Alpha.
20	Robert Kirkman	Conor Hughes	Patricio Delpeche	June 25, 2025
Darak refuses to fight the newly empowered Solila but is forced to defend his father. As the two rivals duel, Skuxxoid Alpha orders the two new Skuxxoids sent for processing; they are examined by several medical robots, who take note of the first Skuxxoid's unhealed scar and order the panicked second Skuxxoid to be moved to priority processing. The older Skuxxoid attempts to follow his younger counterpart but is electrocuted for his resistance. On Junkion, Akronus reluctantly considers an offer to help repair his organic armor, which would violate Cobra-La's sacred anti-technology doctrines, while Darak manages to defuse the tension between Solila and Dulin. The two relate their understanding of their sacred texts to Solila, who counters that the knowledge she learned directly from Zerta must be correct. However, Darak and Dulin remain unconvinced that releasing Goliant is the right option, and Solila is left unsure whether Zerta's plan accounts for the survival of the Agorrians and Zertonians. Meanwhile, Zalilak's trials conclude with a message from Zerta, who orders him to assist Solila at any cost. Now fully convinced of Zerta's righteousness, he burns his old robes and dons new armor from the Keepers of the Light, who name him First Chosen of the Zertonians.
21	Robert Kirkman	Conor Hughes	Patricio Delpeche	July 23, 2025
The first Skuxxoid awakens in a dormitory filled with other Skuxxoids, who warn him not to make trouble lest he be sent to "the Divider." Undeterred, he incites a fight as Zalilak returns to Zertonia and reasserts control over Proximus. He orders an attack on Agorria made ready, while Solila apologizes to Dulin for trying to force unity through fighting. With no way to remove her, Dulin reluctantly allows her to stay in Agorria and attempt to find a more peaceful way forward. Solila and Darak reconnect and swap Handroids to better match their personalities, but are interrupted when Agorria's airspace proximity alarms indicate a fleet of Zertonian fighter ships inbound. The scarred Skuxxoid is summoned before Skuxxoid Alpha as Darak readies the Agorrian air force, while Solila, Springer, and Hot Rod watch Proximus lead a horde of Zertonian soldiers in a ground assault.
22	Robert Kirkman	Conor Hughes	Patricio Delpeche	August 27, 2025
As a Quintesson war fleet musters above Quintessa, Pythona discovers that Grakula's armor has mutated into a strange and jagged new form; however, Grakula claims that it speaks to her and means them no harm. Proximus challenges Springer to a rematch as Dulin takes command of the Agorrian military response. Solila confronts the Zertonian hunter for answers, and he tells her that Zerta and Zalilak believe unity can only be achieved when one half of the Ring subjugates the other. Meanwhile, Skuxxoid Alpha reveals that the scarred Skuxxoid is the oldest of their divisions, dubbing him Skuxxoid Beta. Although he balks at the demeaning title, Beta realizes that the claim must be true based on his especially potent memories of Alpha's family. At the mention of his family, Alpha orders him taken to the Divider, refusing to acknowledge his protests. The Agorrians turn the tide against the Zertonians, but everyone suddenly collapses in pain as their forehead gems begin to glow. As Hot Rod and Springer question why everyone's Energon ports are malfunctioning, a triumphant Proximus proclaims that unity has begun.
23	Robert Kirkman	Conor Hughes	Patricio Delpeche	September 24, 2025
Skuxxoid Beta finds himself strapped to the Divider, a cutting machine designed to optimize as many Skuxxoid divisions as possible before killing its subject. The machine vivisects Beta while the assembled Agorrians and Zertonians are overcome by unity; however, the Sacred Ring is shaken by earthquakes as Goliant's gargantuan fingers emerge from the black hole at its center. The Cobra-La Royal Guards sneak onto Quintessa's surface, reluctantly leaving Grakula behind with her mutated armor, and Pythona is saved from a monster by Wheelie. She recognizes him as a Cybertronian and attacks, while Beta awakens to find himself in pieces. Proximus breaks free from Zerta and Zalilak's control with Solila's help, and he orders the Zertonians to retreat and prevent the Ring's destruction. Goliant's hand retreats back into the black hole, and Dulin claims victory as Darak reunites with his pilots. However, he, Springer, and Hot Rod miss a furious Zerta dragging Solila back into the depths of the Ring, who informs her that her lack of faith has doomed all life in the galaxy.
24	Robert Kirkman	Conor Hughes	Patricio Delpeche	November 5, 2025
Solila remains defiant, no longer sharing Zerta's belief that the Sacred Ring would survive Goliant's release. The despondent Zerta sends her away, while Wheelie's friendliness and strange rhyming speech quirk convince Pythona to stand down. She surmises that the Cybertronians are less of a threat than Golobulus feared, but breaks off the conversation as the Quintesson war fleet departs. The Agorrians begin reconstruction efforts, and Darak gives Springer and Hot Rod a large supply of Energon as thanks for their assistance. The two Autobots leave the Sacred Ring while Dulin reaffirms his alliance with a humiliated Zalilak now that unity no longer requires secrecy. Meanwhile, a reconstituted Skuxxoid Beta escapes from the Divider just as the new Skuxxoids derived from his body awaken, and he decides to lead them in revolt against Skuxxoid Alpha. Solila awakens as Mistress Vil's prisoner in the Temple of Zerta's Light, stripped of her powers, while Dulin commends Darak for his bravery during the battle. Darak admits that he is scared of someday succeeding his father as Agorria's leader, but he is confident they will be able to face the future together as the Quintesson war fleet converges on the Ring.
=== Volume 5: "Quintesson War" ===
25	Robert Kirkman	Andrei Bressan	Patricio Delpeche	December 24, 2025
As Zalilak meets with his advisors in the wake of the failed assault on Agorria, a furious Proximus interrupts the meeting and attacks him for betraying Zertonia and enslaving him to Zerta. The brawl is interrupted when a massive Quintesson Cruiser suddenly appears and drills itself into the ground, destroying the Zertonian capital pyramid and narrowly missing Zalilak and Proximus. In Agorria, Darak and Handroid discuss the nature of the latter's sentience and growing desire to "live" as Dulin meets with his brother, Grand General Dukan. They suddenly receive word of the Quintesson invasion fleet over Zertonia, and Dukan orders Darak and his pilots sent out to investigate the disturbance; however, another Cruiser destroys one of the Agorrian ships as it lands. Solila and her Handroid attempt to free themselves from the Temple of Zerta's Light, but she receives another psychic message from Zerta offering her a second chance.
26	Robert Kirkman	Andrei Bressan	Patricio Delpeche	January 28, 2026
Darak and Handroid realize that Garad, the downed pilot, is still alive, and they turn back to rescue him. They retrieve the unconscious Garad, but Darak's ship drifts out of range before they can return to it; as Handroid recalls the Skuxxoid's warnings about the Quintessons, another of Darak's pilots pushes him back toward his vessel. More Cruisers continue landing across the ring as the Quintesson Judge Naven introduces himself to Zalilak and requests their unconditional surrender, but the Zertonian leader defiantly injures one of his five faces before he can finish speaking. The furious Judge unleashes a horde of Sharkticons in response, and Zalilak and Proximus agree to temporarily put aside their differences as the Quintesson invasion begins in earnest. The Sharkticons quickly overrun both Agorria and Zertonia, and Darak leaves Garad and the other pilots behind to find his father. He is cornered by a Sharkticon but is unexpectedly saved by a released Solila, whose powers have been restored.
27	Robert Kirkman	Andrei Bressan	Patricio Delpeche	February 25, 2026
Solila, Darak, and their Handroids reunite and descend into the ground using the former's abilities. As the Sharkticons overwhelm the Agorrians and Zertonians' attempts to fight back, Pythona overhears the Quintesson Judge Makmun reporting to the other Judges on the invasion's success. Disgusted by the alien technology, she injures a Prosecutor as she escapes. Darak and Solila meet Dulin in the ruins of his throne room, who confirms that the Agorrians have suffered massive losses against the Quintesson forces and that victory is unlikely. However, Darak suggests using the power of Energon to supercharge their soldiers, and they begin to turn the tide of the invasion force. Dulin attempts to bypass the jammed communications to inform Zalilak of their discovery, but Solila personally delivers the message to the besieged Zertonian leader. Injured and enraged, Naven unleashes all of the Quintesson forces held in reserve to crush the Ring's resistance as Zalilak and Proximus lead the Energon-powered Zertonians in a counterattack; however, the Energon restores Proximus' fragmented mind, causing him to remember his true name – Polada, Solila's younger brother.
28	Robert Kirkman	Andrei Bressan	Dee Cunniffe	March 25, 2026
In the past, Polada agreed to join the Zertonian High Guard in exchange for leaving his isolated cell, separating him from Solila. Proximus is moved to tears by his restored memories, but he continues to fight on while Dulin coordinates the Agorrian resistance and Darak and Dukan battle Sharkticons at the front lines. Although the Quintesson forces are overrun by the Energon-powered Agorrians and Zertonians, Makmun reassures the other Judges that victory is still possible with the arrival of the Quintesson Tribunal – a three-faced judge specializing in the judgment of war and military matters. The Tribunal's Cruiser lands in Agorria with Elite Sharkticon reinforcements, and the Tribunal executes a group of surrendered Agorrian soldiers, vowing to lay waste to the Ring and its people. Dulin grimly orders the Agorrians to prepare for their final stand as the Tribunal pushes forward; meanwhile, Vipria, Bola, and Grakula are shot down upon arriving at the Ring, and a horrified Pythona watches the Leviathan crash.
29	Robert Kirkman	Andrei Bressan	Dee Cunniffe	April 22, 2026
Within the depths of the Sacred Ring, Zerta reactivates Vector Theta and orders the supercomputer to restore her injured body. While rushing to the crash site, Pythona is intercepted by Proximus; believing him to be a robotic being, her attempt to disable him inadvertently forms a psychic link between them. Proximus allows her to leave after witnessing her memories of Cobra-La as the Tribunal breaches the Agorrian capital dome. Darak supercharges himself and his ship in a last-ditch effort to destroy the Tribunal, but the massive Quintesson resists the explosion and easily subdues him and the remaining Agorrians. In Zertonia, Pythona is saved from further Zertonian interference by Grakula and Borr, a hound-like mutant creature born out of her original armor, while Solila and Zalilak save another group of resistance fighters. Aboard the Quintessons' flagship, Dulin and a defiant Darak are brought before the Tribunal for sentencing, who drops them into a pit of Sharkticons.
30	Robert Kirkman	Andrei Bressan	Dee Cunniffe	May 27, 2026
An Energon-powered Solila arrives to save Darak and Dulin, but they are quickly overwhelmed by the enormous Elite Sharkticons, and Dulin is killed. Solila escapes with a despondent Darak to meet with Zerta, who urges them to leave the Sacred Ring and seek help from the Cybertronians to break the Quintesson occupation. Solila reluctantly agrees, and Zerta directs them to seek passage aboard the wounded Leviathan before the Royal Guards depart. Although Pythona is suspicious of their Handroids, she approves of Darak's anger towards the Quintessons and agrees to let the pair accompany them. The Tribunal ambushes them and further injures the Leviathan as she takes off, but they manage to escape; Proximus, aware of Cobra-La's existence due to his psychic connection with Pythona, resolves to steal another ship and follow them with Ultum. The furious Tribunal interrupts Naven and Zalilak's negotiations, seeking more conflict, but the Zertonian leader confirms that he and his people are surrendering. After helping Pythona examine the Leviathan's wounds, Darak comforts Solila and confirms that, regardless of Zerta's orders, they will save the Ring from the Quintessons together.
=== Volume 6: "Rom" ===
Rom Special	Robert Kirkman	Lorenzo De Felici	Matheus Lopes	June 10, 2026 (Note: Originally released as part of the M.A.S.K. #1 blind bag program, and given a wider release on August 26, 2026.)
On a mission to rescue a pair of children, the alien cyborg Rom the Space Knight is imprisoned by the insectoid Kulgith the Devourer. His robotic cellmate Kranix informs him that Kulgith separates his edible organic prisoners from the inedible, and Rom's living cloak Carpet soon frees them. After bidding Kranix farewell, Rom is ambushed by Kulgith as he finds the children. The two duel, and Kulgith realizes Rom is an organic being after piercing his armor; however, he and Carpet use the distraction to behead the alien. Rom takes one of Kulgith's arms to replace his own missing limb and brings the children back to their parents, who return a strange device he had left with them as collateral. He admits he has forgotten what the device does and whether any of his enemies, the Dire Wraiths, still exist, but resolves to continue traveling the stars and helping wherever he can.
2026 Special	Robert Kirkman	Conor Hughes	Patricio Delpeche	May 2, 2026
In the far reaches of deep space, Proximus and Ultum's ship crashlands on Junkion, destroying their Energon reserves. They are challenged by an armored sentinel, who confirms that he and the Junkions are willing to help the two stranded Zertonians repair their ship. Proximus explains that they are pursuing agents of Cobra-La, who have kidnapped his sister Solila; the sentinel reveals himself as Akronus, a native of Cobra-La, and agrees to join them on their journey.
31	Robert Kirkman	Conor Hughes	Patricio Delpeche	June 24, 2026
Skuxxoid Beta leads a small army of his divided brethren against Skuxxoid Alpha as the Skuxxoid Liberators. Their older counterpart meets them with a larger group of Skuxxoids and orders them to attack, but Skuxxoid Beta attempts to quell the fighting with promises of freedom and equality for all Skuxxoid-kind. Although Alpha attempts to dissuade the others from listening to him, Beta's younger division confirms that he is not lying, and he challenges the older Skuxxoid to a duel. Alpha is easily overwhelmed, and he finally gives in to Beta's demand for answers about their family – their wife and children had died long ago in a house fire accident, and Alpha had refrained from dividing afterward to ensure no other Skuxxoid would have to bear the painful memories. Beta forgives Alpha, and the other Skuxxoids recognize him as their leader; in the name of equality, he orders that Alpha be allowed to rest and leaves them to retrieve his ship from Junkion. Alpha's robotic servant decides to come with him and takes the grieving Beta away.
32	Robert Kirkman	Conor Hughes	Patricio Delpeche	July 22, 2026
The Royal Guards manage to crash the Leviathan onto a nearby planet, where she dies from her injuries. A distraught Pythona nearly attacks Darak for joking about the millennia-old creature's death, and he awkwardly promises to help them find their way back to Cobra-La for revenge. While the other Guards construct a campsite, the two embark on a patrol of the surrounding alien forest with Solila, and their Handroids pick up signs of a mysterious life form observing them. The next morning, Pythona is overjoyed to find the Leviathan had spawned a new larva before she died, and she apologizes to Darak for her harsh words. Privately, Solila comforts him as he grieves Dulin's death, but they are interrupted as the mysterious stranger – Rom – greets them.
33	Robert Kirkman	Conor Hughes	Patricio Delpeche	August 26, 2026
Rom introduces himself and Carpet as cosmic wanderers helping those in need, having tracked the dying Leviathan's trail. Pythona arrives just as he accuses Darak and Solila of being Dire Wraiths and attacks him, but a large mudgroggle emerges and breaks up the fight. Rom and Carpet manage to lull the creature back to sleep, earning Pythona's trust, and he agrees to help the group by searching the rest of the planetoid for another ship. Later that night, Grakula and Bola find another green growth on the latter's armor but fail to remove it. Rom returns, having found no signs of any transport, and is surprised to find that he has never heard of Pythona's home planet – Earth – before. Meanwhile, Skuxxoid Beta returns to Junkion to reclaim the Rockerroid and threatens the Junkions at gunpoint to return it.
34	Robert Kirkman	Conor Hughes	Patricio Delpeche	September 23, 2026
Wreck-Gar reveals he sold the ship to Akronus, Proximus, and Ultum, and the Skuxxoid confronts the three as they prepare to leave Junk. The Cobra-La camp awakens to find Borr missing, and Grakula storms off to find him after arguing with Pythona. Rom offers to leave the planetoid to find a working ship, but Predacron, a Lunartix bounty hunter sent by the Galactic Authorities to kill Rom, interrupts them. Against the cyborg's warnings, Darak and Solila join the fight against Predacron while the Royal Guards make a break for the bounty hunter's ship, and Grakula and Borr return to save them from a grenade. As Carpet is wounded in the fight, enraging Rom, and the Guards discover something aboard Predacron's ship, they are once again interrupted by the arrival of the Skuxxoid.
35	Robert Kirkman	Conor Hughes	Patricio Delpeche	October 28, 2026
The Guards return holding Predacron's children hostage, to the bounty hunter's dismay. Rom offers to surrender himself to avoid further conflict, but the Skuxxoid gives Predacron one of his arms, creating a clone for him and the Galactic Authorities. After he leaves, Pythona tries to kill the unconscious Skuxxoid but is shocked and disgusted when Akronus reveals himself in his new Junkion armor. She attacks him for breaking Cobra-La's anti-technology doctrines but proves unable to kill him; instead, she orders him to return home to Cobra-La and face Golobulus' judgment. Rom convinces Skuxxoid to bring them all aboard the Rockerroid, where Darak and Solila meet Proximus and Ultum, and the former reveals he is Polada.

== Reception ==
The series received positive reviews, with critics praising the surprising guest appearance of several Transformers and G.I Joe characters in each issue.

The first volume collecting issues #1–6 has gotten positive reviews from the book review and cataloging website Goodreads, holding a strong average score of 3.84 out of 5 stars for 1,089 ratings, and 154 reviews.

In February 2025, the initial 18 released issues have received a collective positive review from the Review Aggregator website Comic Book Roundup, holding a strong average critic rating of 8.4 out of 10 for 142 reviews, and a slightly higher average user rating of 8.6 out of 10 for 315 reviews.

== Collected editions ==
=== Trade paperback editions ===
#	Title	Material collected	Pages	Released	ISBN
1	More than Meets the Eye	Void Rivals #1–6	136	21 Feb 2024	978-1534398184
2	Hunted Across the Wasteland	Void Rivals #7–12; Energon Universe 2024 Special (Void Rivals story)	128	4 Sep 2024	978-1534328372
3	The Key to Vector Theta	Void Rivals #13–18	128	10 Jun 2025	978-1534326910
4	First Chosen	Void Rivals #19–24	128	9 Dec 2025	978-1534329539
5	Quintesson War	Void Rivals #25–30; Energon Universe 2025 Special (Void Rivals story)	128	21 Jul 2026	978-1534332515
6	Rom	Void Rivals #31–36; Rom Special; Energon Universe 2026 Special (Void Rivals story)	152	23 Feb 2027	978-1534353145

=== Hardcover editions ===
#	Title	Material collected	Pages	Released	ISBN
1	Void Rivals: Deluxe Edition, Book 1	Void Rivals #1–12; Energon Universe 2024 Special (Void Rivals story)	272	3 Jun 2025	Darak orange cover: 978-1534328242
1	Void Rivals: Deluxe Edition, Book 1	Void Rivals #1–12; Energon Universe 2024 Special (Void Rivals story)	272	3 Jun 2025	Soila green DM cover: 978-1534332508
2	Void Rivals: Deluxe Edition, Book 2	Void Rivals #13–24; Energon Universe 2024 Special (Void Rivals story)	278	23 Jun 2026	978-1534335257

== Other media ==
=== Toys ===
In March 2025, Hasbro announced a three pack toy line featuring Darak, Solila and Jetfire figures for San Diego Comic-Con. The toys were presented on July 24, 2025.

== See also ==
- Energon Universe
  - Transformers
  - G.I. Joe
- List of comics based on Hasbro properties
