= Cliffjumper =

Transformers character

- Transformers character
- Animated Cliffjumper toy
- First appearance: The Transformers
- Voiced by: Casey Kasem, Takuro Kitagawa, Dwayne Johnson, others

In-universe information
- Affiliation: Autobots

Cliffjumper is a fictional character from the Transformers franchise. He is an Autobot known for his visual resemblance to Bumblebee, although he is characterized as an aggressive warrior.

== History ==
The original toy that became Cliffjumper was originally designed and released in 1983 in Japan by Takara as part of the Micro Change subset of their Microman line. In the United States, Cliffjumper's toy was, like that of Bumblebee, sold as a "Mini-Bot" in Hasbro's Transformers toy line, and he appears in the corresponding 1980s cartoon. While Bumblebee is characterized in the show as friendly and agreeable, Cliffjumper instead is prone to conflict, especially with fellow Autobot Mirage, who he accuses of being a traitor. Cliffjumper transforms into a Porsche 924 in the show, and frequently uses a bazooka as a weapon. In the original cartoon, Cliffjumper is voiced by Casey Kasem in English and Takurō Kitagawa in Japanese.

Cliffjumper, like Bumblebee, did not appear in much media after the original cartoon for quite some time. His name was reused in 2004 for a character in Transformers: Energon, although this Cliffjumper bears no resemblance to the original. Cliffjumper appeared again in Transformers: Animated, this time more closely resembling his original version. The toys produced of Animated Cliffjumper were recolored versions of the toys produced of Bumblebee in the same show. In Animated, he served as a loyal soldier in the Autobot Elite Guard. Cliffjumper returned in 2010 for the first episode of Transformers: Prime. In the first episode, he is captured by the Decepticons and killed, setting the tone for the series. His death haunts Arcee, who was a close friend of his. Later in the show he returns as a zombie. In Prime, he is voiced by Dwayne Johnson.

Cliffjumper also had roles in the Transformers comic book series from Dreamwave Productions as well as the series from IDW Publishing. Within the Dreamwave comic, he retains his hot-headed nature from the original cartoon, and his aggression causes the Canadian military to misinterpret the Autobots as hostile. In the IDW series, he is depicted as a violent warrior that faces internal conflict after befriending a pacifist girl named Kita. When the Decepticons kill Kita, he unleashes his rage and gets revenge on her killers. The IDW comic series also establishes Cliffjumper's backstory as an extra Transformer that was accidentally forged alongside Bumblebee. Cliffjumper was part of the first batch of Autobots who arrive on Earth in the Energon Universe version of Transformers.

Although Bumblebee features prominently in the live-action Transformers film series, Cliffjumper does not appear in any of the films directed by Michael Bay. His first live-action appearance is in the 2018 film Bumblebee, in which he is interrogated and killed on Saturn by the Decepticons Shatter and Dropkick.
