= Stan Lee Universe =

Comic book series

- Publisher: Boom! Studios
- Publication date: October 2010 – November 2011
- Genre: Superhero
Title(s)
- Soldier Zero
- The Traveller
- Starborn

The Stan Lee Universe is a trilogy of American superhero comic books and a shared fictional universe created by Marvel Comics veteran writer and artist Stan Lee, and was published by Boom! Studios between 2010 and 2011. The comics were previously announced in San Diego Comic-Con 2010.

== List of publications ==
Series	Issues	Writers	Artist	Debut date	Finale date
Soldier Zero	12	Stan Lee and Paul Cornell	Javier Pina	October 20, 2010	September 21, 2011
The Traveler	12	Stan Lee and Chris Roberson	Khary Randolph	November 24, 2010	November 2, 2011
Starborn	12	Stan Lee and Mark Waid	Chad Hardin	December 8, 2010	November 16, 2011

== See also ==
- Marvel Universe (Marvel Comics)
- Just Imagine... (DC Comics)
