= Hasbro Universe =

Fictional universes of toy company Hasbro

The Hasbro Universe refers to several shared fictional universes featuring characters from several franchises owned by toy and entertainment company Hasbro.

== List of continuities ==
=== Games and toys ===
- In 2016, the mobile game Transformers: Earth Wars by Space Ape Games and Backflip Studios features G.I. Joe characters Duke, Scarlett, Snake-Eyes, Cobra Commander, Baroness and Storm Shadow.
- In 2018, Hasbro released a toy set titled Revolution Comic Crossover Preview Mega-Set, featuring sixteen figures from Transformers, G.I. Joe, Rom, Micronauts, Action Man, M.A.S.K., and Visionaries.
- Since 2023, Renegade Game Studios released several role playing games and crossover events:
  - G.I. Joe: New Alliances (G.I. Joe and Transformers, 2023)
  - My Little Pony: Collision Course (My Little Pony and Transformers, 2023)
  - Worlds Collide: Battle for the Multiverse (Transformers, G.I. Joe and Power Rangers, 2023)
  - G.I. Joe: Battle for the Arctic Circle (G.I. Joe and Axis & Allies, 2024)
  - Robo Rally/Transformers (2024)
  - Worlds Collide: The Pony Puzzle (My Little Pony, Transformers, G.I. Joe and Power Rangers, 2024)
- In 2023, WS Game Company released Monopoly: 100 Years of Hasbro, a special Monopoly game designed to celebrate the 100th anniversary of Hasbro.

=== Comics ===
- Marvel Comics (1979–1994)
  - Earth-616 / Marvel Universe (1979–1986)
    - The Micronauts
    - Rom: Spaceknight
  - Earth-91274 (1982–1994)
    - G.I. Joe: A Real American Hero
    - The Transformers
- Image Comics and Devil's Due Publishing (2003–2007)
  - G.I. Joe vs. The Transformers series (2003–2007)
    - G.I. Joe vs. The Transformers (2003)
    - G.I. Joe vs. The Transformers II (2004)
    - G.I. Joe vs. The Transformers III: The Art of War (2006)
    - G.I. Joe vs. The Transformers IV: Black Horizon (2007)
- Dreamwave Productions (2004)
  - Transformers/G.I. Joe series (2004)
    - Transformers/G.I. Joe (2004)
    - Transformers/G.I. Joe: Divided Front (2004)
- IDW Publishing (2005–2021)
  - Hasbro Comic Book Universe (2005–2018)
  - The Transformers vs. G.I. Joe series (2014–2016)
    - The Transformers vs. G.I. Joe (2014)
    - The Transformers vs. G.I. Joe: The Movie Adaptation (2016)
  - Aw Yeah Revolution! (2017)
  - My Little Pony/Transformers series (2020–2021)
    - My Little Pony/Transformers: Friendship in Disguise! (2020)
    - My Little Pony/Transformers: The Magic of Cybertron (2021)
- HasLab (2011)
  - Unit:E (2011, for San Diego Comic-Con)
- Grey Global Group (2017)
  - "When Worlds Collide" (2017, for HasCon)
- Image Comics and Skybound Entertainment (2023–present)
  - Energon Universe (2023–present)
  - Cold Slither (2025)
- Boom! Studios (2024–2026)
  - Power Rangers Prime (2024–2026)

=== Films and TV series ===
- From 1983 to 1987, Sunbow Productions and Marvel Productions developed the series G.I. Joe: A Real American Hero, The Transformers, Jem and Inhumanoids. These series had been hinted to share the same universe, mostly due to the appearance of the character named Hector Ramirez.
- On March 28, 2013, producer Lorenzo di Bonaventura announced that he is open to doing a crossover film between the Transformers and G.I. Joe film series (Paramount Pictures and MGM). On June 23, di Bonaventura stated that a crossover was not likely to happen, but on July 9, he reassured there would still be a possibility. On October 23, 2015, Chu confirmed his intentions to make a crossover film between Jem (Universal Pictures) with Transformers and G.I. Joe. On October 29, he hinted about Transformers possibly doing crossovers with other Hasbro products. On January 18, 2017, D. J. Caruso has stated that when he was in talks to be GI Joe 3's director, the discussion included a Transformers and G.I. Joe meeting. However, Paramount did not think the time was right to do so because they did not want to infringe on Michael Bay's running of the Transformers films. In the film Transformers: Rise of the Beasts, there is a mention of G.I. Joe recruiting Noah Diaz (played by Anthony Ramos).
  - On December 15, 2015, Hasbro agreed with Paramount to a deal creating a five-property movie universe by then financing unit Allspark Pictures and distributed by Paramount Pictures. This new universe would consist of the current G.I. Joe film series alongside future film adaptations based on M.A.S.K., Micronauts, Rom and Visionaries. On April 21, 2016, The Hollywood Reporter confirmed that Lindsey Beer, Michael Chabon, Cheo Hodari Coker, Joe Robert Cole, John Francis Daley, Jonathan Goldstein, Jeff Pinkner, Nicole Perlman, Nicole Riegel, Geneva Robertson and Brian K. Vaughan have joined the writers' room for the cinematic universe. In March 2021, Lorenzo di Bonaventura stated the writers' room is disbanded, leaving the project in development hell.
- The Transformers Aligned Universe (comprising the animated series Transformers: Prime and Transformers: Robots in Disguise) features a reference to M.A.S.K. as a division of the United States military that developed a special vehicle.
- In 2018, a short film titled Hasbro All-Stars by Willard Appiah and Shoguns Entertainment was released. In the film, Mr. Monopoly struggles to gather his friends (from various Hasbro brands) for a yearly family photo.
- In October 2025, it was announced that an adult animated television series based on Image/Skybound's Energon Universe comics was in development, with Joe Henderson attached as writer and showrunner of the adaptation.
- The 2026 short film Optimus Prime: Awakening featured the Sacred Ring from the Energon Universe comic series Void Rivals.

== See also ==
- List of comics based on Hasbro properties
- List of films based on Hasbro properties
- List of television programs based on Hasbro properties
