= Ben Abernathy =

American comic book editor

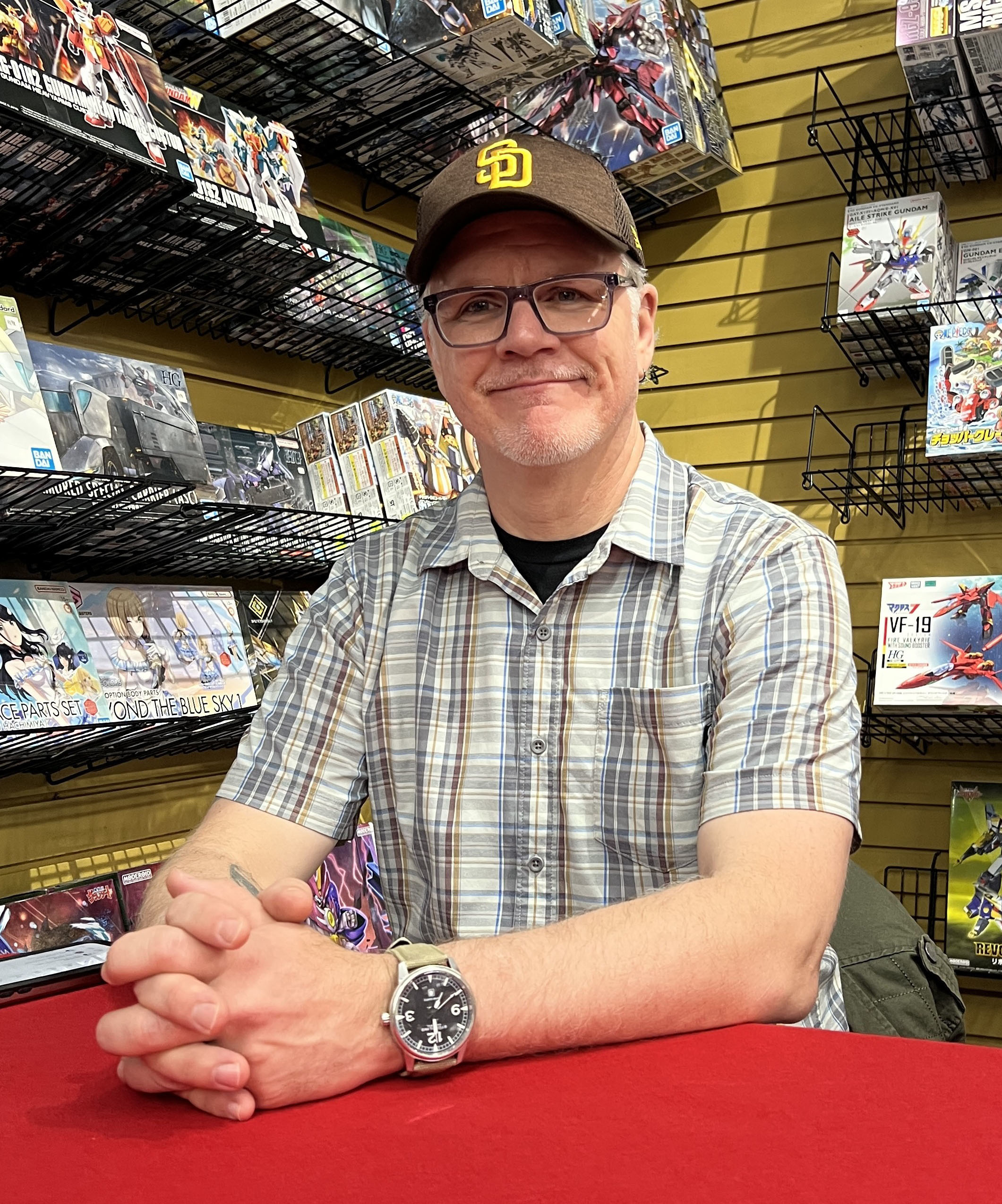
- Abernathy at signing for Energon Universe at Midtown Comics in Manhattan
- Born: Benjamin R. Abernathy; 1975 (age 50–51) Bend, Oregon, U.S.

Benjamin R. Abernathy (born 1975) is a comic book professional. He has worked at DC Comics as an Executive Editor and Group Editor of the Batman books. He was Editor in chief and founder at Madefire, a company that creates motion books, and was previously an editor at Wildstorm, Dark Horse Comics and Marvel Comics. In 2024, he began working for Skybound Entertainment.

== Early life and career ==
Born in Bend, Oregon, in 1975, Abernathy attended Redmond High School, graduating in 1993; that year, he also appeared in the school's production of Arsenic and Old Lace. portraying Officer Brophy. In 1998, he earned his Bachelor of Arts in history from Lewis & Clark College in Portland.

Later that year, Abernathy broke into comics as an Assistant Editor at Dark Horse Comics in Portland, before jumping to New York City in 1999 to work as Creative Services Coordinator at DC Comics.

In 2000, he joined Marvel Comics in New York as Special Projects Manager for a year.

In 2002, he moved back to DC Comics as Group Editor of DC Comics Digital for an entire decade, from 2002 until 2012.

In 2012, he left DC to become co-founder and editor-in-chief of a new digital comics publisher, Madefire, with Liam Sharp, including writing the series The Heroes Club and bringing DC Comics to the platform.

When that closed in 2015, he returned to DC Comics. First as Director – Talent Relations in 2015, then as Batman Group Editor in 2019, which began with his hiring of James Tynion IV and Jorge Jimenez to take over from Tom King on the main Batman book, as well as later hiring Chip Zdarsky to replace Tynion. As a result of such successes, Ben Abernathy was promoted to Executive Editor in late 2021, still keeping his Bat duties.

In 2024, he left DC Comics to move to Skybound Entertainment.
