= Starshine (comics) =

Starshine is the name of three fictional characters appearing in American comic books published by Marvel Comics.

The first version was Landra, an alien woman who was by writer Bill Mantlo and artist Sal Buscema. The second iteration was Brandy Clark, an Earth girl who was again written by Mantlo and Buscema. The third iteration was the Galadorian Anarra, one of the third generation Spaceknights introduced in Jim Starlin's Spaceknights miniseries.

== Fictional character biography ==
=== Landra ===
Starshine
- The cover of Rom #20, featuring Starshine I, Rom and Terminator; art by Sal Buscema

Publication information
- Publisher: Marvel Comics
- First appearance: Rom #14 (Jan 1981)
- Created by: Bill Mantlo and Sal Buscema

In-story information
- Alter ego: Landra
- Species: Galadorian
- Team affiliations: Spaceknights

==== Publication history ====
The first Starshine first appeared in Rom #14 (January 1981, in a backup story), created by writer Bill Mantlo and artist Sal Buscema.

The character subsequently appears in Rom #16 (March 1981), #19–20 (May–June 1981; backup story by Mantlo/S. Buscema, took part in the "Trial of Terminator"), #25 (December 1981), and #27–28 (February–March 1982; arrived on Earth, killed; by Mantlo/S. Buscema).

==== Fictional character biography ====
The first Starshine was Landra, a young woman who lived on the planet Galador 200 years ago. When her world's government called for volunteers to become Spaceknights to battle the Dire Wraiths, Landra was one of those who accepted the call. Her armor gave her the power to use the mystical "Living Light".

After the Spaceknights fended off the Dire Wraith invasion, Starshine teamed with fellow Spaceknights Rom and Terminator to seek out Wraiths that infiltrated nearby star systems. During one mission, she witnessed Terminator kill an innocent. She then acted as the prosecutor during Terminator's trial. Afterwards, she apparently pursued the Wraiths solo. At some point, it appears she completed her mission and returned to Galador, only to be put into stasis by Mentus, who, in the Spaceknights' absence, had usurped the Prime Director's position as the ruler of Galador.

Landra fell in love with Rom. After the Spaceknights defeated Mentus and prevented Galactus from consuming Galador, decided to follow him back to Earth. There she became jealous of Rom's relationship with Brandy Clark. Landra was killed as she prevented a Dire Wraith disguised as Brandy from slaying Rom. She was buried in Clairton.

=== Brandy Clark ===
Starshine
- The cover of Rom #51, featuring Starshine II; art by Mike Zeck

Publication information
- Publisher: Marvel Comics
- First appearance: as Brandy Clark: Rom #1 (Dec 1979) as Starshine: Rom #40 (March 1983)
- Created by: Bill Mantlo and Al Milgrom

In-story information
- Alter ego: Brandy Clark
- Team affiliations: Spaceknights

==== Publication history ====
Brandy Clark first appeared in Rom #1 (December 1979) and was created by Bill Mantlo and Al Milgrom.

The character subsequently appears as the second Starshine in Rom #40 (March 1983; by Mantlo/S. Buscema), #43–44 (June–July 1983), #46 (September 1983), #48 (November 1983), #50–51 (January–February 1984; changed appearance and mood; by M/S.B.), #52–53 (March–April 1984), #55–59 (June–October 1984), #72 (November 1985), Rom Annual #3 (1984; became human again; by Bill Mantlo (writer) and WM Johnson (art)), Rom #73–75 (December 1985–February 1986; reunited with Rom; by Bill Mantlo (writer) and Steve Ditko (art)), Incredible Hulk (vol. 2) #418 (June 1994; revealed to be pregnant; by Peter David (writer) and Todd McFarlane (art)), and Spaceknights limited series #1–5 (October 2000–February 2001; children revealed; by Jim Starlin (writer) and Chris Batista (art)).

==== Fictional character biography ====
Brandy Clark was a young woman residing in the fictional town of Clairton, West Virginia. She was romantically involved with a local young man, Steve Jackson. Brandy was the first person to meet the Spaceknight Rom when he landed on Earth, and she helped him as he tracked down and banished the Dire Wraiths that had infiltrated the town. Brandy came to fall in love with Rom because of his nobility, which caused friction between them and Steve.

Not long after the death of Landra, the original Starshine, Rom left Clairton to continue seeking out Wraiths elsewhere. Brandy felt strangely compelled to dig up Starshine's body. A Wraith sorcerer Doctor Dredd magically transplanted Brandy's body into the Starshine armor as part of an evil plan. This was something she had secretly yearned for; afterwards, she left Clairton and accompanied Rom as he traveled the Earth.

During their absence, all of Clairton's citizens were killed by female Dire Wraiths when they decided to take over from their males. Steve and Brandy's families were among the dead, which made her bitter and vengeful, even causing the Starshine armor she wore to morph into a more fierce-looking one. She continued to help Rom battle the Wraiths. Later, she was magically changed back into her human form by Hybrid.

When all the Wraiths were finally defeated, Rom left for Galador. Brandy remained on Earth. Her desire to be with Rom was noticed by the cosmic entity the Beyonder, who was active on Earth at the time. He granted her wish to be sent to Galador, where she hoped to be reunited with Rom, but she arrived before Rom, and it turned out that a second generation of Spaceknights had turned against the human Galadorians and killed most of them. Brandy joined the underground resistance, but ultimately all human Galadorians were killed, and Brandy herself was only saved by the timely arrival of Rom. With help from the original Spaceknights, Rom defeated the evil ones. He reclaimed his "humanity" (human body parts) which he had until then thought lost. Rom remained on Galador with Brandy while the other Spaceknights (who had lost their human bodies permanently) watched over them from space.

Brandy was seen again at Rick Jones' wedding along with the now-human Rom and she appeared to be pregnant. Brandy had two sons with Rom, both of whom became Spaceknights as well.

When the Builders come to Galador, Starshine helps defend the world along with Terminator, Ikon, Firefall, and Pulsar.

== Powers and abilities ==
Both Starshines derived their powers from their bionic Spaceknight armor. In addition to giving them superhuman strength and the ability to fly in space across interstellar distances, the armor could channel the extra-dimensional energy known as the Living Light from its eyes, which they could use to reveal the true form of a disguised Dire Wraith, or as destructive energy beams.

After being separated from the Starshine armor, Brandy continued to display certain abilities. A "ghost" of Starshine saved Rom from Wraith darkness, and several times the outlines of her armor appeared around her, usually in times of stress. It was noted that when this occurred, she seemed stronger than human, although the plot point was eventually dropped.
