= Micronauts (comics) =

Comic book

- Cover art of Micronauts #1 (January 1979). From left to right: Acroyear, Arcturus Rann, Marionette and Bug. Baron Karza in background. Art by Dave Cockrum and Al Milgrom.

Group publication information
- Publisher: Marvel Comics; Image Comics; Devil's Due Publishing; IDW Publishing
- First appearance: Micronauts #1 (January 1979)
- Created by: Bill Mantlo (writer); Michael Golden (artist)

In-story information
- Type of organization: Team
- Base(s): Microverse

Micronauts

Series publication information
- Schedule: Monthly
- Format: Micronauts; Micronauts: The New Voyages; Ongoing series X-Men and the Micronauts; Micronauts (vol. 3); Micronauts: Karza; Micronauts (vol. 4); Limited series
- Genre: Superhero
- Publication date: (Micronauts); January 1979 – August 1984 (The X-Men and the Micronauts); January – April 1984 (Micronauts: The New Voyages); October 1984 – May 1986 (Micronauts vol. 3); January 2002 – September 2003 (Micronauts: Karza); February – May 2003 (Micronauts vol. 4); January – May 2004
- Number of issues: Micronauts; 59; X-Men and the Micronauts; 4 Micronauts: The New Voyages; 20; Micronauts (vol. 3); 11; Micronauts: Karza; 4 Micronauts (vol. 4); 3
- Main character(s): Arcturus Rann; Marionette; Bug; Acroyear

Creative team
- Writer(s): List: Micronauts Bill Mantlo X-Men and the Micronauts Chris Claremont Bill Mantlo Micronauts: The New Voyages Peter B. Gillis Micronauts (vol. 3) Scott Wherle Micronauts: Karza Jim Krueger Micronauts (vol. 4) Dan Jolley
- Penciller(s): List: Micronauts Michael Golden, Howard Chaykin, Pat Broderick, Keith Giffen, Greg LaRocque, Gil Kane; Jackson Guice; Kelley Jones X-Men and the Micronauts Jackson Guice Micronauts: The New Voyages Kelley Jones Micronauts (vol. 3) Eric Hanson Micronauts: Karza Steve Kurth Micronauts (vol. 4) Pat Broderick
- Inker(s): List: Micronauts Josef Rubinstein, Al Milgrom, Armando Gil, Danny Bulanadi, Kelley Jones X-Men and the Micronauts Kelley Jones Micronauts: The New Voyages Bruce Patterson, Danny Bulanadi
- Creator(s): Bill Mantlo (writer); Michael Golden (artist)

Collected editions
- Revolution: ISBN 1-58240-311-2

There have been four main publishers of the comic book series bearing the name Micronauts based on the toy lines of the same name. The first title was published by American company Marvel Comics in 1979, with both original characters and characters based on the toys. Marvel published two Micronauts series, mostly written by Bill Mantlo, until 1986, well after the toy line was cancelled in 1980. In the 2000s, Image Comics and Devil's Due Publishing each briefly published their own Micronauts series. In 2016, IDW Publishing published own version of the series. A live-action film version of the Micronauts was in development by Hasbro Studios and Paramount since 2009. In 2023, Marvel re-acquired the licensing rights to publish The Micronauts.

In the Marvel Cinematic Universe, the Microverse of The Micronauts is adapted as the Quantum Realm.

== Publication history ==
=== Marvel Comics (1979–1986) ===
The Micronauts began life as comic book characters when Mantlo saw a line of the Mego Corporation's Micronauts action figures. He convinced then editor-in-chief Jim Shooter to get the comics license for these toys, and was hired to script their series. The Micronauts of the comics were integrated into the wider Marvel Universe and often met heroes and villains from other Marvel properties.

The first series of the Micronauts ran from January 1979 to August 1984 and included 59 issues and two Annuals. The series was written by Bill Mantlo and featured art by Michael Golden. Other artists on the series included Howard Chaykin, Steve Ditko, Rich Buckler, Pat Broderick, Val Mayerik, Keith Giffen, Greg LaRocque, Gil Kane, Luke McDonnell, Mike Vosburg, Butch Guice, and Kelley Jones. Micronauts, along with Moon Knight and Ka-Zar the Savage, became one of Marvel's first ongoing series to be distributed exclusively to comic book stores beginning with issue #38 (Feb. 1982).

In the United Kingdom, The Micronauts was first included as a supporting strip in Marvel UK's Star Wars Weekly comic in January 1979 for several months and then in the first nine issues of Star Heroes Pocketbook, alongside Battlestar Galactica, before joining the new Future Tense reprint anthology. Unlike the U.S. version, these strips were printed in black and white.

The Micronauts Special Edition five-issue limited series (December 1983-April 1984) reprinted issues #1–12 and a back-up feature from #25. The X-Men and the Micronauts four-issue limited series (January 1984–April 1984) was co-written by Mantlo and Chris Claremont and drawn by Butch Guice.

The second volume of Micronauts, subtitled The New Voyages, was published from October 1984 to May 1986 and ran 20 issues. The series was written by Peter B. Gillis and featured early-career artwork by Kelley Jones. After this series the Marvel-owned license lapsed.

From the late 1990s the characters Marionette, Arcturus Rann and Bug (all Marvel properties) have appeared in various Marvel titles (without referencing the Micronauts label). Bug has appeared in a solo one-shot and together with cosmic hero Star-Lord, as part of a new incarnation of the Guardians of the Galaxy.

=== Image Comics ===
In June 2002, a new series by Image Comics was published for eleven issues before its cancellation in September 2003. The same year saw a four-issue limited series featuring Baron Karza's origin and his relationship with the Time Traveler entity.

=== Devil's Due Publishing ===
In March 2004, a new series was launched by Devil's Due Publishing, mixing new characters with those based on the toyline. The series ran for three issues and featured art by former Micronauts artist Pat Broderick. More issues were solicited, but never appeared on shelves despite some cover art being released.

=== IDW Publishing (2016-2018) ===
In 2015, IDW Publishing acquired publishing rights from Hasbro to produce new comic books for the Micronauts and Rom the Space Knight, both formerly popularized by Marvel as licensed properties. IDW released Micronauts series in April 2016, written by Cullen Bunn and art by David Baldeon. The comic ran for eleven issues until 2017. It was followed by two five-issue miniseries Micronauts: Wrath of Karza and Rom & the Micronauts which were released between 2017 and 2018.

IDW also featured Micronauts prominently in their crossover epic, titled Revolution. Released in 2016, the crossover featured characters from various licensed toylines that IDW had the rights to, such as Transformers and G.I. Joe. The main line featured a preview issue and five regular issues, plus eight one-shot tie-in issues across the various lines, one of which was Micronauts: Revolution.

=== Marvel Comics (2023–2026) ===
After Marvel renewed the license with Hasbro in 2023, Marvel Omnibus was released in the following year that collected the original Micronauts series.

=== Skybound Entertainment (2026–present) ===
In 2026, Skybound Entertainment announced to have gained the Micronauts license, introducing its characters into the Energon Universe, starting with Baron Karza into the M.A.S.K. comic book.

== Fictional team history ==
=== Marvel Comics version ===
The Micronauts originate in the Microverse, a microscopic universe full of strange planets like the human-inhabited Homeworld which is made up of diverse spherical habitats that are linked together in the fashion of a molecular chain. The original team comes together in response to the threat posed by Baron Karza, former bearded and balding academic turned murderous immortal black-armored dictator, who gained control of Homeworld through the creation of the Body Banks, where life-extending brain transplants are performed on the rich and inhuman genetic alterations on the poor.

Commander Arcturus Rann returned from a thousand-year deep space voyage in suspended animation with Biotron, his robot co-pilot on the HMS (Homeworld Micro Ship) Endeavor, to discover that Karza has slain the royal family, descendants of Rann's parents Dallan and Sepsis who are now worshiped as virtual gods. What follows is an epic war across the Microverse pitting Rann and his allies against Karza.

In addition to Biotron, Rann's team of "Micronauts" includes Princess Mari of Homeworld, who, with her brother Prince Argon, are the only survivors of the slaughtered royal family of Homeworld. Known to the team as Marionette, she falls in love with Rann and leads the team on occasion. The alien gladiators Acroyear and Bug also join Rann's cause, and although completely different - one a noble armor-clad warrior prince and the other a wisecracking insectoid thief - the two become best friends and staunch allies of all Micronauts. The last member of the original team is Microtron, Mari's robot tutor. Although small, Microtron is a resourceful R2-D2-style character and very supportive of all team members.

Warping through the Spacewall, an energy barrier between the Microverse and our much larger universe, and becoming trapped for a time on Earth where they enlarge to the size of action figures, the team encounter the to-them giant-sized Florida teenager Steve Coffin, his ex-astronaut father Ray (who is briefly transformed into the first Captain Universe), the Man-Thing and the evil cyborg scientist Professor Prometheus before returning to the Microverse.

After a series of battles against Karza (who, among his many other powers, can turn into a centaur and fire his fists like rockets) and his genetically-engineered army of vicious and obedient Dog Soldiers, the Micronauts triumph and Karza is apparently killed. Rann is able to claim victory due to the possession of the Enigma Force - a semi-sentient power source that bonded with him during his period of suspended animation and appeared in the form of floating, glowing green entities known as the Time Travelers - which enables him to perform incredible feats. The team then encounters the superhero team the Fantastic Four, who have traveled to a different region of the Microverse to battle the villain Psycho-Man. Bug's love, Jasmine, is killed during the climax of the battle. It is shortly after this encounter that the Micronauts again become trapped on Earth, at a greatly reduced size.

After encounters with the villains Plantman and Molecule Man, the team battle Mentallo and the Fixer, who have allied themselves with the organization Hydra. Joined by one of Acroyear's people - Dagon - the team discovers that the villains and Hydra are secretly under the control of Baron Karza, who is able to resurrect himself by placing his mind in Prince Argon's body. Argon was also converted to a cyborg centaur by the Body Banks, which combined him with his horse Oberon. Although the organization S.H.I.E.L.D. and several representatives of the races of the Microverse help the Micronauts finally defeat Karza, the battle is costly. Biotron is destroyed by Dagon, who is revealed to be an agent of Karza; the Queen of Kaliklak, Bug's home planet, dies in battle; Rann is rendered comatose and Acroyear's traitorous albino brother Prince Shaitan dies summoning the Worldmind, the parallel power to the Enigma Force that sustains their own home planet of Spartak. In desperation, Acroyear bonds with the Worldmind to defeat Karza, but in doing so destroys his world.

While trying to awaken Rann, the remnants of the team have an encounter with the demon Nightmare and accidentally discover that the Microverse is unraveling. A warning left in Rann's mind reveals that three keys will restore balance to the Microverse. The team embarks on a new quest across three new regions of the Microverse: Oceania, Polaria, and the Dead Zone. The Micronauts are eventually successful, and also acquire several teammates, including the bestial Devil and his companion Fireflyte and the robot Nanotron.

A new problem arises when Prince Argon, turning tyrant after donning the sacred white armor of the legendary Force Commander, begins displaying paranoia regarding the Micronauts, and eventually sends a special alien Death Squad to kill them. The Micronauts defeat the unit, and then encounter the mutant Nightcrawler and battle a new foe called Huntarr. Huntarr had been genetically engineered into a virtually indestructible living weapon by Argon to destroy the Micronauts, but Marionette makes him see that Argon is simply using him.

A war against Argon and his forces follows, with several beings from various locations in the Microverse - including Argon's ex-fiancee, the beautiful lowborn rebel leader Slug, and Prince Pharoid of Aegypta and his faithful lieutenant Margrave - joining the team in a bid to stop Argon. After several more encounters with beings such as Doctor Doom, Wasp, and Arcade, Microtron and Nanotron sacrifice themselves to reanimate Biotron's consciousness in the Micronauts' new vessel, the Bioship. Argon is finally revealed to be controlled by the spirit of Baron Karza, who returns once more.

Karza kills Argon and deals the Micronauts a crushing defeat by killing Devil, Pharoid, Slug and Margrave. After regrouping and a series of skirmishes, the remaining Micronauts confront and defeat Karza once and for all.

==== The Micronauts: The New Voyages ====
Weary of war, the surviving Micronauts leave behind the known Microverse (which they discover looking back resembles a galaxy shaped like a DNA Helix) and embark on a journey of exploration. They eventually discover the true nature of the Microverse and, in a final act that restores their ruined world, sacrifice themselves in order to repopulate the planets.

== Team members ==
- Acroyear is the former ruler of the armor-clad Acroyears of the harsh and rocky planet Spartak. He possesses superhuman strength and wields an energy sword.
- Biotron is the first of the roboids who accompanied Arcturus Rann on his 1,000 year mission. The loyal and dependable co-pilot of the H.M.S. Endeavor was destroyed and later resurrected in giant form as a sentient starcraft known as the Bioship.
- Bug is an insect-like thief from the planet Kaliklak. He is highly agile and wields a rocket-lance.
- Cilicia is the mother of Acroyear's child and his former betrothed who turned against him when he was forced to destroy Spartak in order to keep it out of enemy hands.
- Devil is a highly intelligent, animalistic alien from the jungles of Tropica on Homeworld.
- Fireflyte is a sprite who is part of a fairy-like race linked to the Enigma Force and the life cycle of Devil's species.
- Huntarr is a rebellious slum who was transformed into a mallable, monstrous form and brainwashed into attacking the Micronauts. After being freed from Argon's control, he joins the Micronauts to get revenge.
- Marionette is the daughter of the slain rulers of Homeworld and sister of Prince Argon.
- Microtron is Marionette's loyal little personal roboid whose clever computer brain and extendable pincer arms always come in handy.
- Nanotron is a small golden, one-eyed female roboid who served as Microtron's loving assistant.
- Pharoid is a Prince of Aegyptia (also known as Sand Zone) and keeper of the "star scepter". Loyal to the Micronauts' cause, he joins the fight to free all of the zones of the Homeworld.
- Arcturus Rann is a heroic explorer and rotor-winged Space Glider who returned from a 1,000 year mission only to find his world taken over by his former teacher, Karza, who had become a Darth Vader-style despot while he was away.
- Scion is a metallic-skinned descendant of the mysterious Makers and Savior of the Microverse. Originally found as an egg which radiated enough energy to power a spaceship, he hatched into a grotesque big-brained scorpion-like creature. Scion later evolved into a winged humanoid and then into a powerful Prime Being whose every molecule would be reborn as an individual living being.
- Solitaire is a highly manipulative Prime Being with both metamorphic and healing powers. She first took the form of a green-skinned Insectivorid version of the lovely blond Marionette to seduce Bug so that he would help her get on the team. Solitaire then turned herself into a sexy, scantily-clad version of Rann's dark-haired mother Sepsis.

== The Microns ==
Years later Arcturus, Marionette and Bug (both Marvel properties) reappear as a team called the Microns. They aid the mutant Cable when the scientist Psycho-Man abducts the shape-changing Copycat. They battle Microverse inhabitant Baron Zebek of Aegyptus alongside the visiting super-team Alpha Flight and later assist Rick Jones and Captain Marvel during their adventures in the Microverse. In another largely untold tale, they also reteam with the X-Men against Baron Karza, who had recently been reborn, and his ally Thanos who seek to merge several of the sub-atomic universes. Arcturus Rann and Princess Mari became involved in the Psyklop invasion of K'ai, Jarella's homeworld.

== Other versions ==
- In 1997, Marvel accepted a proposed reboot of Micronauts as a new series written by Shon C. Bury, penciled by Cary Nord and inked by Dan Green, using new character designs based on the original characters. Scripts were written for five issues and three issues were penciled, though Marvel was not granted the Micronauts license by the copyright holder, Abrams/Gentile Entertainment, forcing the series to be canceled.
- The Micronauts play a role in Marvel's Earth X series.

== Collected editions ==
The first five-issue story arc of the Image series have been collected into a trade paperback:

- Micronauts Vol. 1: Revolution (112 pages, Image Publishing, June 2003, ISBN 1-58240-311-2)

In 2023, Marvel renewed the license with Hasbro in order to be able to publish Micronauts again. The following year, they released Marvel Omnibus, containing the first 29 issues, two annuals & material from Micronauts Special Edition featuring restored artwork, letter pages, house ads & bonus material:

- "The Micronauts: The Original Marvel Years Omnibus Vol. 1"

In 2024, Marvel also released "Micronauts: The Original Marvel Years Omnibus Vol. 2" and "Vol. 3", and in 2025 and 2026, "Micronauts Epic Collection - The Original Marvel Years" TPB Volumes 1-5.

== In other media ==
=== Action figures ===
From 2005, AGE gave permission for SOTA (State of the Art) Toys to produce redesigned Micronauts action figures as Micronauts Evolution, with concept art by Randy Queen. SOTA president Jerry Macaluso expressed interest in a new comic based on the figures.

=== Animation ===
In 1998, AGE, Annex Entertainment, Gribouille and Kaleidoscope Media Group planned to produce an animated series adaptation, starting with a five-part miniseries to air on the Sci Fi Channel in Fall of 1998, followed by a syndicated 26 episode animated series for 1999, accompanied with action figures and a Marvel tie-in comic. The project was later cancelled.

Boulder Media Limited (a then-subsidiary of Hasbro Studios) developed an animated series adaptation since 2018. 52 half-hour episodes were fully produced, with production concluding in January 2020, but the series' release was quietly cancelled. There has been no official announcement regarding its failure to release or its future; executive producer and head writer Eric Rogers has stated that he has received no information from Hasbro on the fate of the show, and has speculated that it was turned into a tax write-off. Other sources refuted this, claiming that Hasbro still hoped to release the series in conjunction with a potential live-action project in the future. The entire series was later anonymously leaked onto the internet in 2025.

=== Films ===
- The Microverse, referred to as the Quantum Realm, appears in media set in the Marvel Cinematic Universe (MCU).
- In 2009, director J. J. Abrams and his studio Bad Robot were considered to produce a film based on the Micronauts property. In 2013, Rhett Reese and Paul Wernick were working on a screenplay. Wernick said their script was different from the comics, but described the adaptation as "cool and different". The planned project made little progress, but Paramount said at the time that it was still planning a Micronauts film adaptation. In 2015, Hasbro and Paramount were planning a cinematic universe combining Micronauts with G.I. Joe, Visionaries: Knights of the Magical Light, M.A.S.K. and Rom. A writers' room was formed consisting of Michael Chabon, Brian K. Vaughan, Nicole Perlman, Lindsey Beer, Cheo Hodari Coker, John Francis Daley, Jonathan Goldstein, and others to develop storylines, but it disbanded in 2017. In 2019, Dean DeBlois was attached as the writer and director of the film. Originally scheduled for October 2020, it was pushed for June 2021, before it was pulled from the release schedule and was presumed to have been cancelled since then.

=== Novels ===
The 2002 Image Comics relaunch was followed the same year by Micronauts: The Time Traveler Trilogy, a collection of three paperback novels published by Byron Preiss Visual Publications and written by Steve Lyons.

== See also ==
- Microverse
- Multiverse (Marvel Comics)
- Shogun Warriors
