= Hybrid (Jimmy Marks) =

Fictional character appearing in comic books

- Hybrid as depicted in All-New Official Handbook of the Marvel Universe A to Z #5 (May 2006).

Publication information
- Publisher: Marvel Comics
- First appearance: Rom #17 (April 1981)
- Created by: Bill Mantlo (writer); Sal Buscema (artist)

In-story information
- Alter ego: James "Jimmy" Marks
- Species: Dire Wraith/Human mutant hybrid
- Team affiliations: Avengers Academy
- Abilities: Telekinesis; Telepathy; Transformation; Superhuman strength

Hybrid (James "Jimmy" Marks) is a supervillain appearing in American comic books published by Marvel Comics. He first appeared in Rom #17 (April 1981) by writer Bill Mantlo and artist Sal Buscema.

== Publication history ==
Hybrid was featured in the comic book series Rom #17-18 (1981), and was created by writer Bill Mantlo and artist Sal Buscema.

The character subsequently appears in Rom #30-32 (1982), Rom Annual #3 (1984), and X-Man #31 (1997). He was seen (on a TV screen) in New Avengers #18 (2006).

Hybrid received an entry in the All-New Official Handbook of the Marvel Universe A-Z #5 (2006).

He reappeared in Avengers Academy #23-25 (Feb.-April 2012).

Hybrid appeared in New Warriors vol. 5 #1 (April 2014).

== Fictional character biography ==
Hybrid was conceived when a male Dire Wraith (who lived in the fictional town of Clairton, West Virginia under the identity of "Jacob Marks") married a human woman named Marjorie with whom he had fallen in love, and allowed himself to be convinced by her to sire a son. The baby instinctively uses his powers to assume a human form at birth, and is believed to be human.

Sometime before Jimmy turns 15, he is visited by Dire Wraiths who tell him the truth about his origin. They teach Jimmy to use his latent powers, as well as the ways of evil. Marjorie tries to run away with Jimmy, but he refuses and frightens her with a display of his powers.

Jimmy's Dire Wraith teachers are later banished to Limbo by Rom. This infuriates Jimmy, and in his anger he causes his mother to be scalded. Outraged at his son's cruelty, Jacob tries to kill him with a pitchfork, but is easily stopped. As punishment, Jimmy uses his powers to rapidly age his mother.

That same night, Rom arrives at the Marks' farmhouse to investigate Jimmy. Jimmy reveals his true, monstrous form as Hybrid to Rom before battling him. Jacob begs his son to not disavow his human heritage, but Hybrid uses a pitchfork to kill him. The X-Men arrive at the farm, seeking a powerful mutant who they had detected with Cerebro. Jimmy reverts to his human form, giving the appearance that he is a normal child being attacked by a robot. This leads to a battle between Rom and the X-Men. Eventually, Jimmy reveals his true form to the X-Men as well and battles them until Sprite uses Rom's Neutralizer to dematerialize him. Jimmy's mother dies of old age during these events.

Months later, Hybrid reforms his body and allies with Mystique, Rogue and Destiny against Rom, but both Rogue and Destiny came to realize that Hybrid's ultimate goal was to use super-powered females as breeding stock, and they work with Rom to defeat him.

Hybrid reforms again in Cumberland, Kentucky, where he passes himself off as a miracle worker. This brings him into conflict with the New Mutants since the town was the home of one of its members, Cannonball. Rom finds Hybrid again, but cannot prevent him from transforming his ally Starshine back into a human. Once again, Hybrid is disintegrated in the end.

Hybrid reconstitutes himself a fourth time, but his memories are affected, causing him to only remember his human identity. The mutant hero X-Man finds Jimmy and helps him recover his memory, accidentally recreating the evil Hybrid again. A part of his mind was still the innocent Jimmy however, and with his help X-Man seemingly destroys Hybrid.

Jimmy Marks appears as an apparently homeless telekinetic boy under attack by the anti-mutant Purifiers; rescued by faculty members of the Avengers Academy, Jimmy is recruited into the Academy's expanded student body. Jimmy, however, has secretly become Hybrid once more and intends to become the king of Wraithworld. Hybrid finds an ally in a future version of Reptil, who has taken over his past self's body to ensure that certain events occur to maintain his future's history. One of these events is Hybrid "murdering half the Academy"; to facilitate this, Reptil begins to lead students and faculty to Hybrid one by one so that Hybrid may either feed off their powers or, in the case of the women, enthrall them as breeding stock. Together, the students and faculty of the Academy manage to banish Hybrid from Earth.

Once again back on Earth, Hybrid is one of several unnatural beings captured by the forces of the High Evolutionary, who believes that their existence will cause humanity to be destroyed by an imminent Celestial judgment.

== Powers and abilities ==
Hybrid possesses the ability to switch between human and alien form at will. In his alien form, he possesses enhanced strength; in both forms he can use telekinesis and telepathy, including the ability to take control of other mutants' powers. He can reform himself after being destroyed, although it takes time.
