= Rom the Space Knight =

Comic book superhero

Rom
- Cover of Rom #1 (Dec. 1979), art by Frank Miller

Publication information
- Publisher: Marvel Comics
- First appearance: Rom #1 (December 1979)
- Created by: Bing McCoy (toy design); Bill Mantlo (writer); Sal Buscema (artist)

In-story information
- Alter ego: Rom of Galador/Artour
- Species: Galadorian
- Place of origin: Galador
- Team affiliations: Spaceknights
- Abilities: Armor grants: Superhuman strength Extreme durability Flight; Space travel via rocket backpack Survive the vacuum of space Self-repair capabilities Advanced weaponry/scientific equipment

Rom the Space Knight (Note: The name is often stylized as "ROM".) is a superhero who was originally conceived as a toy and then a magazine lead. Rom was created by Scott Dankman, Richard C. Levy, and Bryan L. McCoy for Parker Brothers and is now a Hasbro asset.

After the toy was licensed to Marvel Comics, Rom became a character that debuted in the eponymous American comic book Rom: Spaceknight (December 1979 – February 1986), by Bill Mantlo and Sal Buscema.

In 2016, IDW Publishing published a new Rom comic book series as part of the Hasbro Comic Book Universe.

In 2023, Marvel reacquired the rights to begin publishing omnibus editions collecting the Rom material they had previously published in the 1970s and 1980s.

In 2026, Image Comics and Skybound Entertainment acquired the publishing rights, with the character joining the Energon Universe.

== Toy ==
The original ROM toy in packaging, as released by Parker Brothers in 1979.

"Rom" was co-created by Scott Dankman, Richard C. Levy, and Bryan Lawrence "Bing" McCoy (U.S. patent #4,267,551). It was sold to Parker Brothers and was the inspiration for the comic book series Rom: Spaceknight. The toy was originally named COBOL, after the programming language, but was later changed to Rom, after ROM (read-only memory), by Parker Brothers executives.

The toy set a precedent for the game publishing company, which up until that time had only ever produced board games. As this was a new venture for the company, and given that electronic toys were still very new, a decision was made to produce the figure as cheaply as possible. As a result, the final product had few points of articulation, and twin red LEDs served as Rom's eyes instead of the originally envisioned green, which were more expensive to produce.

Rom appeared in the corner box of the cover of Time magazine's December 10, 1979, issue. It was featured in the interior article, "Those Beeping, Thinking Toys", which decried Rom's lack of articulation and predicted it would "end up among the dust balls under the playroom sofa".

Rom was licensed to Palitoy in the United Kingdom to extend the "Space Adventurer" line of Action Man, appearing in their 1980 catalog. Ultimately, the toy failed and only sold 200,000 to 300,000 units in the US, with creator McCoy blaming the failure on poor packaging and marketing. Parker Brothers subsequently abandoned the line.

A new action figure of Rom was released for the 2017 San Diego Comic-Con and at HasbroToyShop.com in limited quantities as part of the IDW Revolution set alongside figures of Jetfire, Roadblock, Action Man, Leoric, characters from the Micronauts, a Dire Wraith and Matt Trakker.

In 2024, The Loyal Subjects and Hasbro inked a deal to relaunch Rom the Space Knight. One year later, Hasbro launched a 6-inch action figure of Rom, inspired by his appearance from the Marvel comic books, as part of their Marvel Legends product line.

== Publication history ==
=== Marvel Comics (1979–1986, 2023–2024) ===
To build interest in the toy, Parker Brothers licensed the character to Marvel Comics, which created a comic book featuring Rom. The comic expanded on the premise that Rom was a cyborg and provided the character with an origin and personality, and established the character was firmly grounded in the Marvel Universe, having regular encounters with mainstream heroes and villains. The title outlasted the toy it was created to support, with 75 issues and four Annuals (double-sized issues) published from December 1979 to February 1986.

The comic was written by Bill Mantlo and initially illustrated by artist Sal Buscema. Buscema stated in a 2010 interview that he was attracted to the character's concept and found him easy to draw. Buscema was the main artist for the series from its creation through 1984, when Steve Ditko became the regular artist for the remainder of the series.

In 2023, Marvel reacquired their license with Hasbro to publish reprints of their original Rom series. A facsimile edition, reprinting Marvel's first issue, was released that September. The first volume of omnibus collection containing the first twenty-five issues of the original series was released in January 2024. A second and third volume followed in June and December of the same year, respectively.

=== IDW Publishing (2016–2020) ===
IDW Publishing licensed the character from Hasbro, and in May 2016, released Rom #0 as part of Free Comic Book Day. The free issue served as a prologue to a new ongoing series which began in July. Rom continued to be part of the Hasbro Comic Book Universe until 2018, following the Transformers: Unicron event.

A prequel limited series titled Rom: Dire Wraiths, written by Chris Ryall and drawn by Luca Pizzari, Jax O'Connor, Guy Dorian and Sal Buscema, was published in January 2020.

=== Skybound Entertainment (2026–present) ===
In 2026, Skybound Entertainment, an imprint of Image Comics, included Rom in the Energon Universe. A one-shot issue was published in physical edition on June 10, within a blind bag program during the debut of the M.A.S.K. ongoing series. The issue was written by Robert Kirkman, drawn by Lorenzo De Felici, and colored by Matheus Lopes, who are the original creative team of Void Rivals, in which the character debuted in issue #32.

== Fictional character biography ==
=== Marvel Universe ===
Rom was originally human in appearance, and belonged to a utopian society on the planet Galador, where he worked as a poet. When the planet was threatened by the Dire Wraiths, an alien species with shapeshifting abilities, Galador's ruler, the Prime Director, called for volunteers to be transformed into cyborg warriors called "Spaceknights". Volunteers were promised that their "humanity" (the body parts removed to accommodate the armor) would be preserved and restored to them after the danger was over.

Rom is the first to volunteer, transforming him into a silver humanoid that appears to be completely robotic. Rom is given Galador's greatest weapon, the Neutralizer, which can banish the Wraiths to Limbo. Inspired by his example, other Galadorians volunteer; eventually, one thousand were transformed into Spaceknights—each with unique armor, powers and code names. The Spaceknights succeed in stopping the Dire Wraith invasion, with Rom following the remnants of the fleet back to their home planet, Wraithworld. The Dire Wraiths panick, and after a futile counter-attack, abandon Wraithworld. Unable to stop Rom, the Dire Wraiths trick him into allowing their escape. Rom, feeling responsible for the Dire Wraiths' spread across the universe, swears that he will not reclaim his humanity until all of the Dire Wraiths have been vanquished. Fellow Spaceknights, including comrades Starshine and Terminator, adopt the same oath and leave Galador. Terminator ultimately goes insane, killing Starshine and attempting to kill Rom and his human friends.

After 200 years in space, Rom arrives on Earth, landing near the fictional town of Clairton in West Virginia. Rom befriends a local woman named Brandy Clark, who, after witnessing Rom deal with the Dire Wraiths, begins to assist him in his mission. Those witnessing Rom's neutralizer could not see the Wraiths being banished to Limbo, leading Rom to be hunted for supposedly killing innocents.

During his time on Earth, Rom battles and banishes thousands of Dire Wraiths. The increasingly desperate Dire Wraiths create new foes for Rom, including Firefall, a fusion of human and Spaceknight; the sorcerous Hellhounds; and robotic Watchwraiths. Two of Rom's greatest foes are Hybrid (a human-Dire Wraith hybrid), and Mentus (a suit of Spaceknight armor occupied by the dark side of the Prime Director's psyche). Rom is one of the many heroes transported into an arena in space for the Contest of Champions, though he is not chosen to participate.

A new breed of Dire Wraith arrives on Earth, appearing to be far deadlier than the first variety. It is later revealed that these were females who relied on sorcery, as opposed to the weaker males who placed faith in science. Unlike the males, the female Dire Wraiths choose not to act in secrecy; they openly attack Clairton while Rom is away, killing everyone with the exception of Brandy. Furthermore, they attack S.H.I.E.L.D.'s mobile headquarters, giving Earth authorities clear evidence of the Dire Wraiths' existence and threat. Rom manages to banish all of the Dire Wraiths on Earth to Limbo with the aid of his super-powered allies and members of the U.S. military.

Rom leaves Earth soon after the battle and returns to Galador. Unknown to Rom, Brandy had accidentally met the entity called the Beyonder and asked to be transported to Galador. The Beyonder complies and Brandy is transported to Galador, now a war-torn world occupied by a new generation of Spaceknights. Created to defend Galador in the absence of the first Spaceknights, this next generation of cyborgs were corrupted by power and massacred the Galadorians in a show of superiority. In an act of spite, the new Spaceknights destroy the frozen remains of the originals. Rom arrives too late and is only able to save Brandy. Enraged, Rom summons the original Spaceknights and destroys the traitors. Rom then discovers that humanity persisted within the entombed body of Terminator. Reclaiming it, Rom becomes human again and finally admits his love for Brandy. The two choose to remain on Galador with the intent of repopulating the planet. The remaining Spaceknights, with their humanity now lost, set out to explore the universe, except for a few others who remain on Galador to protect Rom and Brandy.

In the Spaceknights miniseries (Oct. 2000 – Feb. 2001), written by Jim Starlin, it is revealed that Rom took the name Artour and that he and Brandy had two sons. Rom is not seen in the series, nor is he mentioned by name (possibly to avoid copyright issues with Parker Brothers); his ship is attacked off-panel just prior to the start of the story, with Rom missing and presumed dead.

=== Hasbro Comic Book Universe ===
Rom

Publication information
- Publisher: IDW Publishing (2016–2018)
- First appearance: Rom #0 (July 2016)

In-story information
- Alter ego: Rom K'atsema
- Species: Elonian
- Place of origin: Elonia
- Team affiliations: Solstar Order/Space Knights

Rom has a major role in the Hasbro Comic Book Universe by IDW Publishing.

Two hundred years ago, Rom K'atsema lived an idyllic life with his brother and mothers on the peaceful planet Elonia, a world constantly protected by a powerful planet-wide shield that blocked debris and potential invaders. Rom studied geology at the Elonia University of Arts and Sciences, and befriended Livia and Fy-Laa. One day, the three of them investigated a mysterious meteor shower that had breached Elonia's shield and discovered that the explosive meteors were of Dire Wraith origin: weapons designed to penetrate the shield in advance of a potential Wraith invasion, and ultimately responsible for killing his family. When the Space Knights of the Solstar Order intervened, Rom learned that one of his mothers had been infected by a Wraith and transformed into one of their number. Vowing to avenge his family, Rom and his friends joined the Solstar Order as Space Knights.

On his first mission, Rom discovers Elonia's supply of Ore-12, a liquid metal capable of "bonding" with its wielder and becoming a permanent suit of armor. Realizing that this mysterious metal was the reason why the Dire Wraiths had attacked their world, the Solstar Order mines the rest of the ore and equips the rest of their Space Knights with the substance. Soon afterwards, Rom—now a full-fledged Space Knight—leaves Elonia, leaving behind a beacon in memory of his family. Over the next fifty years, Rom takes part in a variety of battles against the Dire Wraiths and participates in a massive battle that saw the Wraiths' current homeworld destroyed. The Space Knights spends the next few years pursuing the remnant Dire Wraith forces.

When Rom arrives on Earth, he is misjudged as Cybertronian. He kills a Dire Wraith impersonating General Joseph Colton, which later exposes the Wraith infiltration around Earth. In time, he gains new allies like the Micronauts, and together, they stop Baron Karza and the Presence (the Wraith goddess). When Unicron arrives, it destroys Elonia, which causes Rom to learn more about the monster and its link to the Dire Wraiths' creation. After Optimus Prime sacrifices himself to destroy Unicron, Rom and the surviving Elonians accept Earth as their new homeworld, and Rom and Livia rekindle their previous relationship.

=== Energon Universe ===
Rom reappears in the Energon Universe comics, starting with his own solo adventure in the one-shot of the same name and later from issue #33 of Void Rivals onward.

While searching for a group of abducted children, Rom is captured by Kulgith the Devourer and imprisoned alongside the long-captive Lithone Kranix. With the help of a small organic companion called Carpet, Rom escapes and locates the children being held within Kulgith's fortress. Confronting the Devourer, Rom battles the creature and ultimately kills him. He then safely returns the children to their parents, who reward him with the return of a device he had left as collateral. Having taken one of Kulgith's blade-like arms to replace his lost limb, Rom resumes his travels across the galaxy with Carpet, continuing his mission of helping those in need and searching for any remaining Dire Wraiths.

== Powers and abilities ==
Rom's armor was composed of the Galadorian metal plandanium. It is extremely durable, even able to stand up to Wolverine's adamantium claws. It was shown to be damaged from time to time, demonstrating that plandanium is not indestructible. The armor had self-repair capabilities, though it took several weeks to repair major damage. It provided him with superhuman strength, flight, and the ability to travel through space via backpack rockets. It allowed him to breathe in any atmosphere and survive in the vacuum of space. In Spaceknight form, Rom also did not need to eat or sleep. Controls near the torso allowed Rom to lower the armor's temperature to well below zero. The armor stored a "solar charge" that could be used as a weapon and could drain power sources by mere contact. It gave him the ability to summon three pieces of equipment stored in "subspace".

Neutralizer
Rom's primary weapon, the Neutralizer is designed to banish Dire Wraiths to Limbo. Rom's Neutralizer would inspire a similar creation by Forge, capable of neutralizing mutant abilities. The IDW incarnation is designed to destroy Wraith bio-matter, with a low level blast being capable of curing those who have only been recently infected. It originally looked similar to its toy counterpart, before merging with the Ore-12 in ROM's armor changed it into a sleeker, gun-like device.
Analyzer
The Analyzer is a gun-like device that allows Rom to see Dire Wraiths in their true form and assess the energy and potential of any object/entity. It can be used on an item which represented a world, such as a globe, and would display lights corresponding to Dire Wraith infestations at that point on the planet. In the IDW series, his energy Analyzer is represented as two red lenses mounted on his arms. The arms transform to reveal the lenses, which emit a red light when in operation.
Universal translator
The translator allows Rom to instantly learn the language of any creature, irrespective of their origin. This device is used to scan and store printed information from an encyclopedia in Rom's memory banks for future use. In the IDW series, the Translator is not a separate piece of equipment, but a function of Rom himself. When he first speaks, he uses an alien language before shifting to English, seemingly mid-sentence.

== Other versions ==
As Marvel Comics no longer possesses the licensing rights to Rom from Parker Brothers, the character is not allowed to appear in his armored form. Marvel has found ways to work around this dilemma.

- In 2000, Marvel published a five-issue SpaceKnights series which featured a hero named Prince Tristan (codenamed "Liberator") in a redesigned version of Rom's armor.
- In the series Captain Marvel, Rick Jones has a toaster in the shape of Rom's helmet.
- An alternate universe version of Rom appears in Earth X, where he is only referred to as "the Greatest Spaceknight".
- In The Avengers #12.1, Ultron utilizes an armor resembling the Spaceknights.

== Reprint omissions ==
After Marvel lost their original license to the character, no reprints or collections of the Marvel series were produced due to Marvel's loss of the rights to Rom and the appearance of many Marvel owned characters throughout the series.

During the time that Marvel did not hold the Rom license, issues regarding the reprinting of Rom guest appearances in other comics led to complications. Brief cameos such as a holographic version of the character appearing as a distraction in Uncanny X-Men #187 have remained intact as have the Rom entries in the Essential Marvel trade paperbacks for the original Official Handbook of the Marvel Universe and its deluxe edition sequel. The cover of the Essential Official Handbook of the Marvel Universe removed Rom from the artwork used for the cover of the collection.

Several appearances by Rom have been outright omitted from reprint editions. Power Man and Iron Fist #73, which featured Rom, was omitted from Essential Power Man and Iron Fist vol. 1, and similarly Marvel Two-in-One #99 was omitted from Essential Marvel Two-in-One vol. 4, while The Incredible Hulk: Regression trade paperback features a heavily edited version of The Incredible Hulk #296, removing Rom's entire appearance in the issue. Furthermore, Rom #72, which was a tie-in to the Secret Wars II series, was omitted from the Secret Wars II Omnibus.

Volume 1 of the Marvel Omnibus, released in January 2024, features the first 29 issues of the series as well as Power Man and Iron Fist #73.

== In other media ==
In 2015, Hasbro and Paramount Pictures were planning a cinematic universe combining Rom with G.I. Joe, Micronauts, M.A.S.K., and Visionaries: Knights of the Magical Light. A writers' room was formed consisting of Michael Chabon, Brian K. Vaughan, Nicole Perlman, Cheo Hodari Coker, John Francis Daley, and others to develop storylines, but it disbanded in 2017. In 2018, Zak Penn was attached to write the Rom film's script.

== See also ==
- Shogun Warriors
- Transformers
