= Bug (Marvel Comics) =

- Cover of Bug #1 (March 1997), art by Derec Aucoin and John Dell.

Publication information
- Publisher: Marvel Comics
- First appearance: Micronauts #1 (January 1979)
- Created by: Bill Mantlo (writer); Michael Golden (artist)

In-story information
- Place of origin: Microverse
- Team affiliations: Guardians of the Galaxy; Micronauts
- Notable aliases: Galactic Warrior, Lover Bug
- Abilities: Ability to cling to walls Exceptional agility Extraordinary sight Enhanced peripheral vision via helmet Antennae enable: Communication with others bearing antennae Heightened sensory awareness with a limited degree of danger sense

Bug is a superhero appearing in American comic books published by Marvel Comics. Bug was originally a member of the Micronauts and later joined the second incarnation of the Guardians of the Galaxy.

When he first appeared in Micronauts #1 (dated January 1979), Bug was also known as Galactic Warrior, taking this name from a figure from the Micronauts toy line on which the comic book series was based. The toy based characters were all owned by Takara Co., Ltd., with any original characters owned by Marvel. Starting with the fourth issue, the Galactic Warrior's title was dropped. This was done after Marvel realized that since the character's design looked nothing like the toy, they could assume ownership if they used a different name.

== Publication history ==
=== Micronauts membership ===
Bug appeared as a featured character throughout Micronauts original run, starting from the first issue until issue #59 (dated August 1984), the series' final issue. Months later Marvel restarted the series with Micronauts: The New Voyages #1 (dated October 1984) with Bug once again appearing as a featured character. This second series lasted until issue #20 (dated May 1986).

=== Planned relaunch and solo one-shot ===
In the 1990s, Marvel began plans to launch a new series starring the Micronauts, despite the fact that they no longer held the publishing rights to the toy based characters. Assuming that Abrams Gentile Entertainment (the company that, at the time, owned the American rights to the Micronaut toy line) would agree to this new series, Marvel hired Shon C. Bury to write the series and Cary Nord to draw it. In preparation Bug and the other Micronauts that Marvel owned guest starred in Cable #39 (dated January 1997) and Bug was featured in a solo one-shot (dated March 1997). The negotiations with AGE eventually fell apart, the series was shelved and the three issues already produced were never published.

Bug would later appear with the other Marvel owned Micronauts (now named the Microns) in issues of Captain Marvel in 2000 and 2001.

=== Annihilation: Conquest ===
Bug did not make any further appearances until 2007. At this point he appeared alone, without any of the other Microns, as a prisoner of the alien Kree. He was then recruited into a hastily assembled covert team led by Star-Lord. His activities at this point were depicted in the limited series Annihilation: Conquest - Star-Lord and Annihilation: Conquest. He was then a recurring character in the second volume of Guardians of the Galaxy, which spun out of the events of Annihilation: Conquest.

=== Guardians membership ===
Although Bug was not a founding member of the "modern" Guardians team, Rocket Raccoon asked him to join when the original group disbanded after some internal misunderstandings. Bug agreed, and fought alongside the Guardians as they attempted to stop the Shi'ar-Kree interstellar conflict known as the War of Kings. Although they failed, Bug stayed with the Guardians as they dealt with the war's aftermath in the "Realm of Kings" storyline through the series' end with issue #25 in 2010. Bug appeared as a member of the Guardians in Avengers Assemble issues #4-8 in 2012. Bug appeared in flashback to talk to Moondragon in a bar in Guardians of the Galaxy (2020) issue #5.

== Powers and abilities ==
Bug can cling to walls and has exceptional agility. He has extraordinary sight, with enhanced peripheral vision gained by wearing his helmet. His antennae enable communication with others bearing antennae, and provide heightened sensory awareness with a limited degree of danger sense.

== In other media ==
In an interview for Guardians of the Galaxy, director and screenwriter James Gunn revealed that Bug was in a previous script for the film as a part of the team. He later revealed that he was unlikely to appear in any future Marvel Cinematic Universe project as Marvel does not own the rights to the character, further stating that Hasbro still owns the rights to Bug, However, the accuracy of this statement is uncertain given Bug's numerous appearances in Marvel's comics long after the company's loss of the Micronauts license. In Ant-Man and the Wasp: Quantumania, a character named Veb, voiced by David Dastmalchian, appears and shares some similarities, implying that he is intended to be a stand-in for the character.
