= Energon Universe =

2023 American mass media franchise

- Created by: Robert Kirkman
- Original work: Void Rivals #1 (June 2023)
- Owners: Hasbro; Image Comics; Skybound Entertainment
- Years: 2023–present

The Energon Universe (EU) is an ongoing American mass media franchise and shared fictional universe created and overseen by Robert Kirkman, being developed and presented by Skybound Entertainment, an imprint of Image Comics, in collaboration with Hasbro. The franchise is the successor of the Hasbro Comic Book Universe (2005–2018) by IDW Publishing, and features concepts and characters from old and new intellectual properties.

== History ==
=== Background ===
Before IDW Publishing lost the licenses to produce Transformers and G.I. Joe comics at the end of 2022, in December 2021, The Hollywood Reporter shared the news that Skybound Entertainment, an imprint of Image Comics, was in talks with Hasbro to acquire those licenses. Skybound would then officially announce it in June 2023.

=== Intellectual properties ===
List of intellectual properties featured in the Energon Universe
N °	Intellectual property	Debut year	Creator(s)	Note
1	Void Rivals	2023	Robert Kirkman and Lorenzo De Felici	Original comic book series Co-owned by Hasbro and Skybound Entertainment
2	Transformers	1984	Shōji Kawamori and Kazutaka Miyatake (Japan); Bill Mantlo, Bob Budiansky and Ralph Macchio (USA); Simon Furman (UK)	Co-owned by Hasbro and Tomy
3	G.I. Joe	1964	Stanley Weston and Donald Levine	—N/a
4	M.A.S.K.	1985	Kenner Parker, Jack Forster and Roger Sweet	Previously owned by Kenner Products
5	Rom the Space Knight	1979	Scott Dankman, Richard C. Levy and Bryan L. McCoy (toy); Bill Mantlo and Sal Buscema (comic)	Previously owned by Parker Brothers
6	Micronauts	1976	Bill Mantlo and Michael Golden (comic)	Previously owned by Takara and Mego Corporation

== List of media ==
=== Comics ===
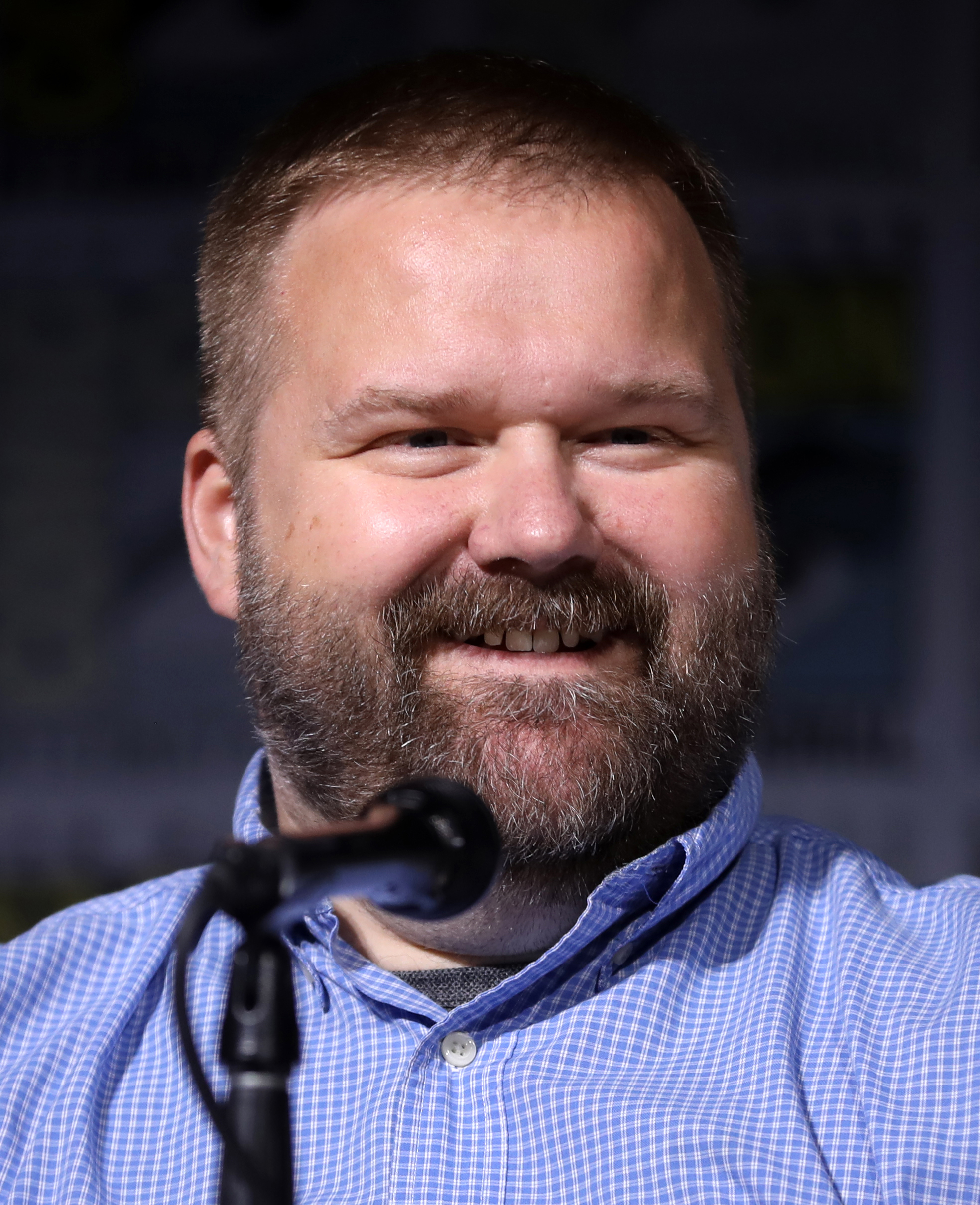
Void Rivals co-creator and writer Robert Kirkman acts as the "showrunner" of the EU comic line. He also began writing Transformers in October 2025.

==== Phase One ====
The EU debuted on June 14, 2023, with the original comic book series Void Rivals, written by Robert Kirkman, and initially drawn by Lorenzo De Felici and colored by Matheus Lopes. Kirkman and De Felici had previously worked together in another comic titled Oblivion Song.

Kirkman said, "It's a tremendous honor to be able to reintroduce this world to a new audience under the Skybound banner. I’ve loved these characters for most of my life and to have the opportunity to add to the already rich tapestry Hasbro has built with the all-new Void Rivals is an unbelievable opportunity. If you look at everything done with Transformers and G.I. Joe, you can see the inkling of a vast universe with tremendous potential for crossovers and interaction that will enhance the fan experience while staying true to the individual identities of both concepts. I look forward to exploring that potential for years to come."

Michael Kelly, who was Vice President of Global Publishing on Hasbro until December 2023, added, “When we first discussed the plan for the surprise reveal in Void Rivals #1, I never expected it would be a secret we could keep for over a year. Now that it is finally here, we are all excited to finally be able to talk about all the amazing stories to come from our great new partners at Skybound.”

Void Rivals is followed by a Transformers ongoing series and four G.I. Joe limited series featuring Duke, Cobra Commander, Scarlett, and Destro as main protagonists. Kirkman also brought up the possibility of adding other action brands from Hasbro in the future, and confirmed that they will not have more than four series running at once, (Note: As depicted in the letters page for Void Rivals #3.) as well as not adding more titles (for now) to keep the line at a manageable, easy-to-follow size. (Note: As depicted in the letters page for Void Rivals #15.)

In June 2024, Skybound officially announced the new G.I. Joe ongoing series that follows its four previous prequels. In November 2024, Skybound announced deluxe editions for the coming years.

==== Phase Two ====
In 2025, characters from the M.A.S.K. franchise were officially introduced into the universe. Matt Trakker (Note: The character appears in the IDW version.) debuted in the G.I. Joe story of the 2025 Special, while Miles Mayhem debuted in Transformers #25. In February 2026, Skybound officially announced a M.A.S.K. ongoing series for June 2026.

In June 2026, Skybound announced the official introduction of Rom the Space Knight in the franchise, debuting in a Rom Special one-shot issue included in the blind bag program of the M.A.S.K. series. Rom then appeared in the sixth arc of Void Rivals (starting from issue #32).

In August 2026, M.A.S.K. #3 featured the introduction of Baron Karza, the antagonist character of the Micronauts franchise. During an interview in Collider, Kirkman revealed he is planning the EU to last for decades, being inspired by the storytelling featured in both the DC Universe and the Marvel Universe.

=== Toys ===
Energon Universe toy line
Name	Debut	Manufacturer	Line	Ref.
Autobot Jetfire, Agorrian Darak and Zertonian Solila	March 2025	Hasbro	None	
Optimus Prime with Megatron Arm	October 2025	Hasbro	Studio Series	
Shredhead	July 2026	Hasbro	Studio Series	
Optimus Prime	October 2026	Blokees	Champion Class	
Starscream and H.I.S.S. Tank	November 2026	Blokees	Champion Class	

=== Games ===
In 2026, Chinese company Kayou released an exclusive Transformers card game, which features covers from the Energon Universe comic.

In October, Renegade Game Studios announced a crowdfounding campaign on Backerkit for an Energon Universe role-playing board game, which is planned for release on 2027.

=== Animation ===
In October 2025, it was announced that an adult animated television series based on the EU was in development, with Joe Henderson attached as writer and showrunner of the adaptation.

== Setting ==
=== Premise ===
The Energon Universe is set in the present (modern era); the franchise name makes reference to the substance that Transformers need to survive.

In the Sacred Ring, there is a war between planets Agorria and Zertonia. When two rivals crash on a mysterious planetoid, they must work together in order to survive. In the process, they learn a secret that will change everything they believed about their war.

Meanwhile, the other war on Cybertron between Autobots and Decepticons expands to Earth, leading to the foundation of G.I. Joe and Cobra in response. A chain of events will cause all those factions to fight against each other, changing the fate of humanity—and the universe—forever.

=== Features ===
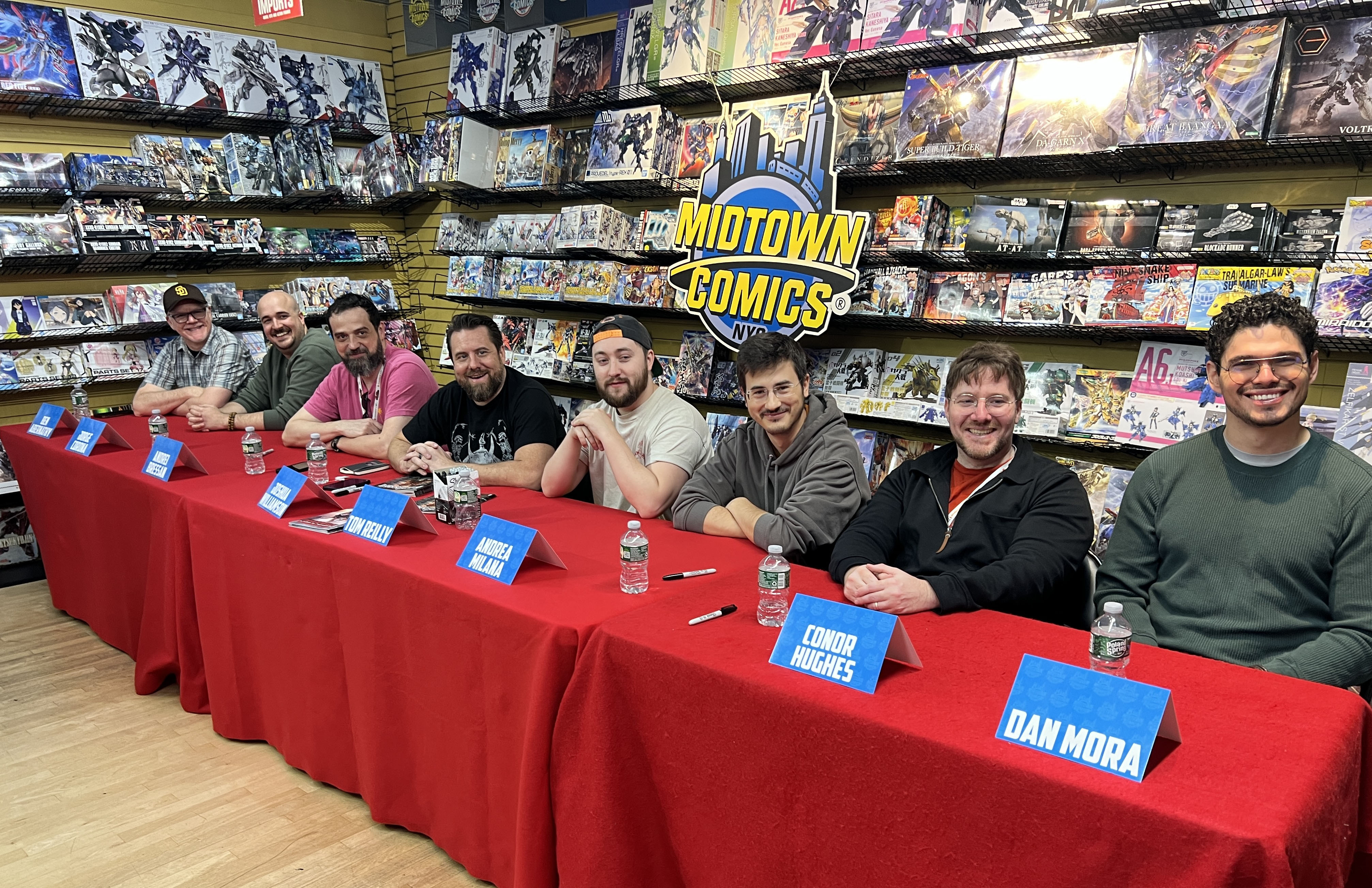
Comics creators at an October 2025 book signing for Energon Universe at Midtown Comics in Manhattan. From left to right: Ben Abernathy, Jorge Corona, Andrei Bressan, Joshua Williamson, Tom Reilly, Andrea Milana, Conor Hughes, and Dan Mora

Star system	Planet	Species/Race	Factions
Hadean System	Cybertron	Cybertronian (Transformer)	Autobots; Decepticons
Sacred Ring	Agorria	Agorrian	Keepers of the Light; Unifiers
Sacred Ring	Zertonia	Zertonian	Keepers of the Light; Unifiers
Solar System	Earth	Earthling (human)	Arashikage clan Battle Force 2000; Cobra; Cobra-La; Dreadnoks; G.I. Joe; M.A.R.S. Industries; M.A.S.K. Mugenonami group Night Force; Shadow Watch; United States military V.E.N.O.M.
Solstar Order	Elonia	Elonian	Space Knights
—N/a	Junkion	Junkion (Transformer)	Junkions
—N/a	Monacus	Monacolian	—N/a
—N/a	Nebulos	Nebulan	—N/a
—N/a	Prysmos	Prysmosian	—N/a
—N/a	Quintessa	Quintesson	Allicons; Sharkticons

== See also ==
- Hasbro Universe
  - Hasbro Comic Book Universe (2005–2018)

=== Other universes ===
- DC Universe (1938–present)
- Marvel Universe (1940–present)
- Whoniverse (1963–present)
- Buffyverse (1992–present)
- Monsterverse (2014–present)
- Bootleg Multiverse (2017–present)
- Massive-Verse (2021–present)
- Nacelleverse (2024–present)
