= Watchwraith =

Fictional character

Watchwraith is a fictional character appearing in American comic books published by Marvel Comics. The character first appeared in Rom #16.

== Fictional character biography ==
Watchwraith was a tall robotic synthezoid who served the Dire Wraiths and fought Rom the Space Knight.
