= Shogun Warriors (comics) =

American comic book team

- Shogun Warriors #2 (March 1979), cover art by Herb Trimpe and Al Milgrom

Series publication information
- Publisher: Marvel Comics
- Schedule: Monthly
- Format: Ongoing series
- Genre: Superhero
- Publication date: February 1979–September 1980
- Number of issues: 20

Creative team
- Writer(s): Doug Moench; Steven Grant
- Penciller(s): Herb Trimpe; Mike Vosburg
- Inker(s): Dan Green; Mike Esposito; Jack Abel; Steve Mitchell
- Creator(s): Doug Moench; Herb Trimpe
- Editor(s): Al Milgrom

Shogun Warriors

Group publication information
- Publisher: Marvel Comics
- First appearance: Shogun Warriors #1 (February 1979)
- Created by: Doug Moench; Herb Trimpe

In-story information
- Base(s): Shogun Sanctuary
- Leader(s): The Followers of the Light
- Agent(s): Richard Carson; Genji Odashu; Ilongo Savage

The Shogun Warriors were a fictional team appearing in comic books published by Marvel Comics. The series was based on the Mattel toyline of the same name, itself licensed from Japanese toy company Popy. The storyline followed a trio of young heroes recruited by the Followers of Light to pilot the eponymous mecha against Maur-Kon and the Followers of Dark.

== Creation ==
Shogun Warriors was an early example of an American toy company importing Japanese toys for their domestic market, a pattern that would later be replicated by Transformers and Power Rangers, among others. Mattel licensed the toys from Popy, who were experiencing large success in Japan with die-cast representations of characters and vehicles from television shows – particularly super robot anime and live-action Sentai. The Shogun Warriors toyline was made up of over a dozen figures drawn from various series, so in order to promote them Mattel approached Marvel to produce an all-new comic tie-in, impressed by the publisher's success with Godzilla, King of the Monsters. Only three figures would be featured in the comic: Raydeen (originally from Brave Raideen); Dangard Ace (from Wakusei Robo Danguard Ace) and Combatra (from Chōdenji Robo Combattler V).

== Development and licensing ==
The Shogun Warriors comic series emerged from a broader Marvel-Toei partnership negotiated by Gene Pelc, Marvel's representative in Japan. Under a three-year licensing agreement between Marvel and Toei that began in 1978, both companies could use each other's properties. This arrangement allowed Marvel to incorporate Japanese robot designs from Toei anime programs Wakusei Robo Danguard Ace and Chōdenji Robo Combattler V into their comic book adaptation of the Mattel Shogun Warriors toyline.

== Creative development ==
Stan Lee approached Doug Moench, who at the time was associated with Marvel's darker stories due to his work on Werewolf by Night and Deathlok. Partly influenced by his children's positive reaction to the sample toys he was given, Moench accepted it as a change of pace. With no information about the characters' Japanese background, Moench set about crafting a mythos that he hoped would appeal to young readers while still being intelligent, penning a bible for the series. Moench attempted to ground the series by focusing more on the human characters than the robots. Herb Trimpe was assigned as artist; with no character references included, he based his designs for the trio of Shogun Warriors on the toys, and designed the various enemies from scratch. The pair had worked together well on Godzilla, King of the Monsters, also based on a licence brokered by Mattel. Like that series, Shogun Warriors was set in the Marvel Universe; the comic would make occasional references to Godzilla character Red Ronin. Moench would also produce some artwork used by Mattel on toy advertisements.

== Publication history ==
In order to quickly forefront the toy-based characters, Shogun Warriors #1 began in medias res, with the team's origin being covered in flashback. Shogun Warriors #6 (dated July 1979) was one of several Marvel comics at the time to print fan letters from Kurt Busiek, who would later embark on a professional career as a comic writer; he was broadly positive about the title. Doctor Demonicus crossed over as an antagonist from Godzilla, King of the Monsters from #7, but despite Marvel having licensed both properties from Mattel and the titles running parallel for a period, Godzilla himself never appeared in the comic. Steven Grant contributed a fill-in issue for #15; the following issue saw Moench retool the series by wiping out the Followers of Light, the organization that mentored the Shogun Warriors. Shogun Warriors #18 featured an antagonistic robot named Megatron; a few years later, a character of the same name would appear in The Transformers franchise, a toyline that also featured a backstory created by Marvel.

The following issues featured guest appearances from the Fantastic Four, but Shogun Warriors was cancelled after 20 issues, with the final edition dated September 1980. Moench recalled that sales were a factor, and he was given enough warning to wrap up the main storyline in the final issue. It has also been speculated that licensing issues were a concern, while a notice in the letters page of Shogun Warriors also suggested Moench's work on Moon Knight was a factor. To tie up the potential loose end of a trio of hugely powerful robots of questionable ownership lurking in the Marvel Universe, Moench used a guest slot on Fantastic Four #226 to have Raydeen, Dangard Ace and Combatra (all unnamed and obscured) destroyed and their human operators Richard Carson, Genji Odashu and Ilongo Savage returned to their mundane lives as a stuntman, test pilot and oceanographer, respectively. As of 2024 the characters have yet to reappear in any other Marvel comics, while the licensing issues have meant Shogun Warriors has never been reprinted in trade paperback form.

== Fictional history ==
On prehistoric Earth, the alien Followers of Light defeated the Followers of Dark – also known as the Myandi – in the Great Chaos War. The Myandi were buried under a volcano in Asia, while the Followers of Light established the ankh-shaped Shogun Sanctuary, whose location was given inconsistently either as the mountains of Japan or the Himalayas. Subsequent generations of the Followers of Light would monitor the volcano until it erupted, reviving Maur-Konn and the remaining Myandi, who unleashed the monster Rok-Korr on Tokyo. Doctor Tambura and the other observers at the Shogun Sanctuary had accounted for this possibility, and have been observing a group of humans to aid them in their battle – American stuntman Richard Carson, Japanese test pilot Genji Odashu and Malagasy oceanographer Ilongo Savage. The trio are transported to the Shogun Sanctuary and – despite their initial skepticism – are persuaded to pilot the mighty Shogun Warrior robot Raydeen into battle, managing to divert the creature from the city. After further training, Carson is assigned as Raydeen's pilot while Genji and Ilongo are given command of two further Shoguns, Combatra and Dangard Ace. Together they are able to conclusively defeat Rok-Korr. Angered by the failure, Maur-Kon prepares the Mech-Monster to destroy the Shogun Warriors, but tampering by his lieutenant Magar sees the machine imbued with dark sorcery; while Raydeen and Dangard Ace battle the creature, Genji takes Combatra to investigate its point of origin, only to be ambushed by Maur-Kon's Dark Agents. After Carson and Savage defeat the Mech-Monster they follow, but come under attack from Combatra, under the control of Maur-Kon. Genji is able to escape and help destroy Maur-Kon's base, but the villain escapes.

After their successful training, the Shogun Warrior pilots are given pendants and allowed to return to their civilian lives until the next crisis arises. Carson meets up with his partner and fellow stunt driver Deena at Los Angeles International Airport, who is annoyed at his extended, inexplicable absence. Savage and his fellow researcher and romantic interest Judith attempt to pick up on the delays caused to his colleagues' dolphin research. Odashu meanwhile finds herself at the center of a diplomatic incident caused by her disappearance. They were disturbed, however, when Doctor Demonicus dispatched creatures to attack them; on the West Coast of the United States, Carson is challenged by Cerberus, and summons Raydeen to battle the attacker, eventually driving it off. Ilongo and Dangard Ace come under attack from the alien Starchild, while Genji's court-martial in Japan is disrupted by the appearance of the fearsome Hand of Five which she battles with Combatra. The Followers of Light deduce that the attacks are linked; while Genji is able to defeat the Hand of Five she heads to Los Angeles, feeling she will never be able to clear her name. Discovering a meteor heading towards Earth, Tambura summons Carson, Odashu and Savage to Shogun Sanctuary. The Shogun Warriors destroy the object and spot a hidden space station behind the Moon, setting off to investigate. The base belongs to Doctor Demonicus, who disables the robots and captures Dangard Ace Combatra and Raydeen arrive, and the trio come under attack from Starchild, Cerberus and the Hand of Five. Their teamwork allows them to destroy their enemies, and they deliver Doctor Demonicus and his neutralised space station back to S.H.I.E.L.D. and Dum Dum Dugan on Earth. The Shogun Warriors' success attracted the attention of the Yakuza, who attempted to use an imposter to steal Raydeen but were foiled.

A mysterious figure known as the Primal One meanwhile targets Shogun Sanctuary, levelling the facility and killing the Followers of Light while the Shoguns were kept busy by his agents. The trio instead created impromptu bases for the robots near their homes, though this led to Combatra briefly being accidentally discovered and piloted by the 11-year old Enrique Velez until Raydeen and Dangard Ace were able to bring it under control. Off Madagascar, Dangard Ace then comes under attack from the huge Megatron; with the aid of the other two the machine is defeated, but not before announcing that the Primal One's next target is Reed Richards. The trio head to the Baxter Building to warn him, arriving just before the huge Gigantauron arrives to attack. The Shogun Warriors and Fantastic Four pool their resources to defeat the invader. They set off in Combatra to the Primal One's base, where the Invisible Girl discovers that the Primal One is Maur-Kon, ending his control over his minions.

Some two months later, Carson, Odashu and Savage were targeted by a man named McLaughlin who had stumbled across the ruins of the Shogun Sanctuary and discovered a semi-complete fourth Shogun Warrior, the Samurai Destroyer. Drunk on power, he destroyed Combatra, Raydeen and Dangard Ace to neuter any opposition. The trio of pilots went to the Fantastic Four for help, and the gathering was able to defeat the Samurai Destroyer. McLaughlin activated the robot's self-destruct, but the heroes got him to safety, and the resulting explosion levelled the remains of the Sanctuary. Carson and Savage returned to their careers while Odashu would eventually clear her name and was later hired by the Maria Stark Foundation, joining the Avengers' support staff.

== Legacy ==
Screen Rant would include Shogun Warriors on its list of '10 Best Comic Books Based on Toys' due its "fun story and great action". Comic Book Resources noted the appearances by the Fantastic Four on a list of the ten best Marvel Universe/licensed property crossovers, noting the novelty of the characters getting a bookend for their stories after the title's cancellation.

== See also ==
- Micronauts
- Transformers
- Rom the Space Knight
