= Outcast (TV series) =

2016 American horror television series

- Genre: Drama; Supernatural horror
- Created by: Robert Kirkman
- Based on: Outcast by: Robert Kirkman; Paul Azaceta
- Starring: Patrick Fugit; Philip Glenister; Wrenn Schmidt; David Denman; Julia Crockett; Kate Lyn Sheil; Brent Spiner; Reg E. Cathey; Madeleine McGraw
- Theme music composer: Atticus Ross
- Composers: Atticus Ross; Leopold Ross; Claudia Sarne
- Country of origin: United States
- Original language: English
- No. of seasons: 2
- No. of episodes: 20

Production
- Executive producers: Robert Kirkman; Chris Black; David Alpert; Sharon Tal Yguado; Sue Naegle; Adam Wingard; Howard Deutch
- Producer: Pavlina Hatoupis
- Production location: West Virginia
- Cinematography: David Tattersall; Evans Brown
- Editors: Louis Cioffi; Henrk Van Eeghen; Paul Trejo; Alan Cody
- Camera setup: Single-camera
- Running time: 44–55 minutes
- Production companies: Circle of Confusion; Skybound Entertainment; Fox International Studios

Original release
- Network: Cinemax
- Release: June 3, 2016 – September 28, 2018

Outcast is an American horror drama television series based on the comics of the same name by Robert Kirkman and Paul Azaceta. A ten-episode first season debuted on Cinemax on June 3, 2016. It is a supernatural horror story that features people involved in demonic possession, and revolves around the life of Kyle Barnes, who is rejected by the people of Rome, West Virginia, for allegedly hurting his wife and daughter.

On March 14, 2016, ahead of its premiere, Outcast was renewed for a second season. The second season premiered on Fox in the UK on April 3, 2017, and concluded on June 5, 2017. It began airing in the United States on July 20, 2018, and concluded on September 28, 2018. On October 2, 2018, it was announced that Cinemax had officially cancelled the series.

== Cast and characters ==
=== Main cast ===
- Patrick Fugit as Kyle Barnes, a young man struggling with the effects of demonic possession
- Philip Glenister as John Anderson, the local Reverend and a close associate of Kyle
- Wrenn Schmidt as Megan Holter, Kyle's sister and wife of Mark
- Kate Lyn Sheil as Allison Barnes, Kyle's ex-wife and the mother of his daughter, Amber
- David Denman as Mark Holter, a local police officer and husband of Megan (season 1; guest season 2)
- Julia Crockett as Sarah Barnes, Kyle's estranged mother who also suffered from possession
- Brent Spiner as Sidney, a mysterious preacher
- Reg E. Cathey as Byron Giles, Rome's Chief of Police
- Madeleine McGraw as Amber Barnes, Kyle and Allison's daughter (recurring season 1; main season 2)

=== Supporting cast ===
- Gabriel Bateman as Joshua Austin, a young boy who is also suffering from possession (guest season 1; recurring season 2)
- C. J. Hoff as Aaron MacCready
- Melinda McGraw as Patricia MacCready
- Pete Burris as Officer Lenny Ogden (season 1; guest season 2)
- Debra Christofferson as Kat Ogden (season 1; guest season 2)
- Willie C. Carpenter as Norville Grant (season 1)
- Scott Porter as Donnie Hamel (season 1)
- Callie McClincy as Holly Holter, Megan and Mark's daughter
- Charmin Lee as Rose Giles
- Briana Venskus as Officer Nuñez (season 2)
- Chris Greene as Oscar (season 2)
- C. Thomas Howell as Simon Barnes; Kyle's estranged father (season 2)
- Hoon Lee as Dr. Kenneth Park (season 2)
- M. C. Gainey as Bob Caldwell; local junkyard owner (season 2)
- Madelyn Deutch as Dakota (season 2)

== Production ==
Fox International Studios and Robert Kirkman developed the television series before the comic book was published. Cinemax picked up the United States rights for the project after the script was done. The series is produced by Fox International Studios for Cinemax in the United States and Fox international channels outside of the country. Robert Kirkman's Skybound Entertainment is also a producer on the series.

A 10-episode initial order was announced with lead cast Patrick Fugit as Kyle Barnes and Philip Glenister as Reverend Anderson, along with Gabriel Bateman, while Adam Wingard was hired to direct the pilot produced by Fox International Channels. More cast was announced including David Denman as Mark Holter, Melinda McGraw as Patricia MacCready, Grace Zabriskie as Mildred, Catherine Dent as Janet Anderson, Lee Tergesen as Blake Morrow, and Brent Spiner.

On August 10, 2015, production began on the first season in South Carolina. The cities of Chester and York, South Carolina were transformed into the series' fictitious town of Rome, West Virginia.

== Episodes ==
=== Season 1 (2016) ===
Outcast, season 1 episodes
| No. overall | No. in season | Title | Directed by | Written by | Original release date | U.S. viewers (millions) |
|---|---|---|---|---|---|---|
| 1 | 1 | "A Darkness Surrounds Him" | Adam Wingard | Robert Kirkman | June 3, 2016 | 0.152 |
Kyle Barnes, a troubled and depressed young man who has been dealing with demonic possession that has plagued him all his life, offers to help John Anderson, a local reverend, who is dealing with Joshua Austin, a young boy who has begun to show signs of possession and has started terrorizing his family. However, Kyle's state of mind to cope with the situation is questionable, having struggled to re-adjust to normal life after dealing with the demonic possession of his mother throughout his teenage years.
| 2 | 2 | "(I Remember) When She Loved Me" | Howard Deutch | Jeff Vlaming | June 10, 2016 | 0.193 |
Kyle is appalled to discover the state of the care home in which his mother is living, and decides to bring her home to live with him—but his actions do not go unnoticed. Mark and Byron discover an abandoned caravan out in the woods after a poacher discovers a number of mutilated animals nailed to trees. Kyle convinces Megan to deliver a present on his behalf for Amber's birthday. Reverend John Anderson recruits his flock to spread the word of the Lord in an attempt to encourage more townsfolk to come to church.
| 3 | 3 | "All Alone Now" | Howard Deutch | Chris Black | June 17, 2016 | 0.170 |
Kyle and John Anderson come up against an unusual possession: a former police officer, who after becoming possessed, raped and murdered his partner's wife. Anderson is sure that they are dealing with a different category of demon, but Kyle is unconvinced and continues to press the victim for answers. Meanwhile, Mark convinces Byron to allow him to collect potential evidence from the abandoned caravan. Megan is freaked when she discovers that an old acquaintance, Donnie Hamel, is in town.
| 4 | 4 | "A Wrath Unseen" | Julius Ramsay | Robert Kirkman | June 24, 2016 | 0.249 |
John Anderson begs Kyle for help when it appears that one of his parishioners, Mildred, whom he supposedly cured two years ago, still shows signs of possession. Byron suspects that a friend of his, Lenny, is involved in the forest mystery after the watch discovered by Mark is identified as belonging to him. Later, Byron catches Lenny setting fire to the caravan. Megan confronts Donnie and warns him to stay away from her and her family, but when Mark discovers his true identity, he decides on a more drastic course of action.
| 5 | 5 | "The Road Before Us" | Craig Zobel | Robin Veith | July 8, 2016 | 0.145 |
John Anderson tries to assure Kyle that his exorcisms work, but is shocked to discover that a young farm girl that he exorcised little over a year ago had abandoned her family and taken to the streets. Byron questions his pal, Lenny, about his connection with the eerie camper in the woods, while Mark uncovers a DNA match to a fingernail recovered from the crime scene. Kyle worries for his estranged wife Allison, but as he tries to explain his motives, she begins to question what really happened on the day they split up.
| 6 | 6 | "From the Shadows It Watches" | Tricia Brock | Joy Blake | July 15, 2016 | 0.205 |
Kyle tries to readjust to a normal life in the community, but a shock attack soon forces him to question his ability to simply ignore the unexplained events that are happening around him. John Anderson tries to carry out an exorcism on his own, and begins to doubt the success of his previous attempts. Megan receives an unexpected call from Donnie, and discovers that Mark was responsible for a vicious attack which could potentially leave him brain damaged.
| 7 | 7 | "The Damage Done" | Leigh Janiak | Nathaniel Halpern | July 22, 2016 | 0.173 |
Remembrance Day in Rome proves to be a coming of age for John Anderson, who lashes out at Sidney for the brutal attack he suffered the previous night. Byron begins to suspect that Lenny could be showing signs of possession, and asks Kyle to investigate. Megan tries to silence Donnie, but despite accepting her offer of a payout, decides to double-cross her and bring charges against Mark regardless. Allison discovers that Amber remembers more than she first thought, and she looks to Kyle for comfort.
| 8 | 8 | "What Lurks Within" | Scott Winant | Tony Basgallop | July 29, 2016 | 0.154 |
Byron arrests Sidney for the assault on John Anderson, but having become strangely drawn towards the mysterious man, Aaron offers him an alibi for the night of the attack, forcing Byron to take no further action. Lenny finally reveals the truth about the eerie camper. Having alienated his parishioners, Anderson tries to turn a good deed by exorcising Kat Ogden, but finds that Kyle is no longer willing to support his efforts. Kyle is alarmed when Megan begins to show signs of erratic behaviour.
| 9 | 9 | "Close to Home" | Howard Deutch | Adam Targum | August 5, 2016 | 0.146 |
Mark offers to help Kyle track down Allison. John Anderson tries to regain the respect of his parishioners, but ends up becoming seemingly isolated in the process. Lenny and his wife decide to start a new life outside of Rome. Aaron continues to use his friendship with Sidney to drive a wedge between Anderson and his mother. Megan discovers that she is pregnant, much to the delight of Mark. But as her weird behaviour continues to escalate, a shocking turns of events leaves Mark fighting for his life.
| 10 | 10 | "This Little Light" | Loni Peristere | Chris Black | August 12, 2016 | 0.152 |
Kyle responds to the distress call from Amber and discovers that Mark has been murdered. As he and John Anderson go in search of Megan, Byron's wife is left in charge of the children, leaving Sidney with the perfect opportunity to lure Kyle into a trap. As the truth behind the tragic events that have plagued Rome finally begins to reveal itself, Kyle fights to save what is left of his family. Anderson decides to end Sidney's reign of terror once and for all by burning down his home, but makes a tragic misjudgement.

=== Season 2 (2017) ===
Outcast, season 2 episodes
| No. overall | No. in season | Title | Directed by | Written by | Original release date | U.S. viewers (millions) |
|---|---|---|---|---|---|---|
| 11 | 1 | "Bad Penny" | Tricia Brock | Chris Black | April 3, 2017 (Fox UK) | 0.149 |
Kyle and Amber decide to return to Rome, much to the surprise of the townsfolk. Reverend Anderson struggles to comfort Patricia, aware that he may have inadvertently been responsible for her son's death. Sidney has disappeared, and Byron, aware of the Reverend's involvement, is determined to keep the state police from investigating the arson attack. As Megan slowly begins to recover, Kyle realises that he has not yet seen the last of his demons. As he attempts to confront a suicidal Lenny Ogden, events take a tragic turn.
| 12 | 2 | "The Day After That" | Loni Peristere | Adam Targum | April 10, 2017 (Fox UK) | 0.091 |
A police officer finds Mark Holter's car overturned in the woods and discovers Mark's dead body. Kyle discovers new allies to Sidney, while Megan suffers with the reminiscences of the possession. Amber runs away from home. Anderson reveals to Patricia that he may have killed her son, resulting in a confrontation. Kyle tries to explain to Megan that something was controlling her, and that she is not responsible for Mark's death. Kyle visits his mother at the hospital and discovers that she is dying slowly. It is revealed that Dr. Kenneth Park, Kyle's mother doctor, is familiar with Sidney, who is plotting a demonic ritual with a decomposing corpse.
| 13 | 3 | "Not My Job to Judge" | Howard Deutch | Jeff Vlaming | April 17, 2017 (Fox UK) | 0.081 |
After attempting suicide, Megan receives help from Anderson and decides to move back into her former home, but the plan falls apart when memories affect her and her daughter, Holly. Sidney begins to take care of Patricia's son, Aaron, who is full of second-degree burns in his body and decides to help Sidney in his evil plans. Kyle takes Amber to see her mother in the hospital, and the girl is chased by a strange couple. Allison and Kyle argue, and Kyle takes Amber back home. Patricia is abducted by someone unknown, who is later revealed to be Bob, a friend of Byron who is helping him. Megan reveals to Kyle that she is pregnant.
| 14 | 4 | "The One I'd Be Waiting For" | Alrick Riley | Rebecca Sonnenshine | April 24, 2017 (Fox UK) | 0.049 |
| 15 | 5 | "The Common Good" | Ti West | Chris Black & Adam Targum | May 1, 2017 (Fox UK) | 0.157 |
| 16 | 6 | "Fireflies" | Fernando Coimbra | Sarah Byrd | May 8, 2017 (Fox UK) | 0.113 |
Amber does not believe that her father, Kyle, is dead. The family visit the hospital with Reverend Anderson to speak to the doctor. Meanwhile, Kyle is shown to be alive and being held in a disused hospital wing by Sidney. While in the hospital, Amber senses that her father is near and leads her mother, aunt and Reverend Anderson to him. She says that Fireflies can see other Fireflies.
| 17 | 7 | "Alone When It Comes" | Josef Wladyka | Helen Leigh | May 15, 2017 (Fox UK) | 0.117 |
| 18 | 8 | "Mercy" | Daisy von Scherler Mayer | Jeff Vlaming | May 22, 2017 (Fox UK) | 0.098 |
| 19 | 9 | "This Is How It Starts" | Howard Deutch | Adam Targum | May 29, 2017 (Fox UK) | 0.093 |
| 20 | 10 | "To the Sea" | Loni Peristere | Chris Black | June 5, 2017 (Fox UK) | 0.108 |

== Broadcast ==
Internationally, the series is broadcast by Fox International Channels starting in June 2016. On May 20, 2016, in Europe, Fox Networks Group streamed the first episode over Facebook Live. TV5 air the episodes on Philippine free-to-air television within 24 hours of their American premiere starting June 4, 2016.

== Reception ==
=== Critical response ===
The first season received mostly positive reviews from critics. The review aggregator website Rotten Tomatoes gave the series an approval rating of 79%, based on 38 reviews, with an average rating of 8.1/10. The site's critical consensus reads, "A cut above average summer fare, Outcast provides the genuine chills one should – but often can't – expect from television horror." Metacritic, which uses a weighted average, assigned the series a score of 70 out of 100, based on 28 critics, indicating "generally favorable reviews".

Jasef Wisener of TVOvermind, gave the pilot episode a 4.8/5, praising the premiere for not "hold[ing] back with the action or the frights," calling it "fun as hell" and a "series for anyone that likes horror." James Charisma of Playboy noted that unlike the horror in series creator Robert Kirkman's other series, The Walking Dead, in Outcast, "the threat is unseen, lurking under the surface ... characters exist in the present but live in the past, haunted by terrors and ordeals from days gone by."

=== Ratings ===
Outcast : U.S. viewers per episode (thousands)

| Season | Episode number | | | | | | | | | | Average |
| Season | 1 | 2 | 3 | 4 | 5 | 6 | 7 | 8 | 9 | 10 | Average |
|---|---|---|---|---|---|---|---|---|---|---|---|
| 1 | 152 | 193 | 170 | 249 | 145 | 205 | 173 | 154 | 146 | 152 | 174 |
| 2 | 149 | 91 | 81 | 49 | 157 | 113 | 117 | 98 | 93 | 108 | 106 |

Audience measurement performed by Nielsen Media Research (Note: The viewership statistics in the graph and table are sourced from the citations in the season-specific tables above.)

== Awards and nominations ==
Award nominations for Outcast
| Award | Year | Category | Nominee | Result |
|---|---|---|---|---|
| Fangoria Chainsaw Awards | 2017 | Best TV Actor | Patrick Fugit | Nominated |
