= Outcast by Kirkman and Azaceta =

American comic book series

Outcast
- Cover art for the first issue of Outcast (June 2014).

Publication information
- Publisher: Image Comics
- Schedule: Monthly
- Format: Ongoing series
- Genre: Horror
- Publication date: June 2014 – April 2021
- No. of issues: 48

Creative team
- Created by: Robert Kirkman
- Written by: Robert Kirkman
- Artist: Paul Azaceta
- Letterer: Rus Wooton
- Colorist: Elizabeth Breitweiser
- Editor: Sean Mackiewicz

Collected editions
- A Darkness Surrounds Him: ISBN 1-63215-053-0
- A Vast and Unending Ruin: ISBN 1-63215-448-X
- This Little Light: ISBN 1-63215-693-8
- Under Devil's Wing: ISBN 1-5343-0050-3
- The New Path: ISBN 1-5343-0249-2
- Invasion: ISBN 1-5343-0751-6
- The Darkness Grows: ISBN 1-5343-1239-0
- The Merged: ISBN 1-5343-1604-3

Outcast (trademarked as Outcast by Kirkman and Azaceta) is an American comic book series created by writer Robert Kirkman and artist Paul Azaceta.

It is a supernatural horror story that chronicles Kyle Barnes, a man whose loved ones have been involved in demonic possession since his childhood. With the help of a clergyman, he tries as an adult to unveil what lies behind the supernatural manifestations and why he seems to carry special peculiarities.

The first issue of the monthly comic was published in 2014 by Image Comics. The series ran for a total of 48 issues until its completion in April 2021.

Before the first release, Kirkman also began to develop a television adaptation with Cinemax which began airing in June 2016 and ended in 2018 after two seasons.

== Publication history ==
Outcast was announced in October 2013 at New York Comic Con, after two years of development. Kirkman said it was the first time that he already had a clear ending in mind when he began to write the comic book. He described Outcast as an epic horror story, hoping to give real scares to readers, unlike The Walking Dead style. Kirkman said that orders for the first issue were higher than for the most recent issue of The Walking Dead.

== Issues ==
1. A Darkness Surrounds Him, June 25, 2014
2. From The Shadows It Watches, July 30, 2014
3. I Remember When She Loved Me, August 27, 2014
4. To Light Our Way, September 24, 2014
5. A Wrath Unseen, November 12, 2014
6. Receive Your Mark, December 24, 2014
7. The Road Before Us, March 18, 2015
8. A Vast and Unending Ruin, April 29, 2015
9. What Lurks Within, May 27, 2015
10. A Weakness Exposed, July 1, 2015
11. A Line is Crossed, August 5, 2015
12. Close to Home, September 9, 2015
13. This Little Light, November 25, 2015
14. Get Behind Me Satan, December 16, 2015
15. All Alone Now, January 27, 2016
16. Overwhelmed, February 24, 2016
17. The Damage Done, March 23, 2016
18. There is No Escape, April 27, 2016
19. Under Devil's Wing, July 27, 2016
20. A Power Exposed, August 24, 2016
21. Blood is Spilled, September 28, 2016
22. The Ticking Clock, October 26, 2016
23. The Darkest Before, November 23, 2016
24. No Turning Back, January 11, 2017
25. Light of Day, February 22, 2017
26. The Sharpened Edge, March 29, 2017
27. A New Way, May 3, 2017
28. His Growing Flock, June 7, 2017
29. Unwelcomed, July 26, 2017
30. A Coming Storm, September 6, 2017
31. Homelife, October 25, 2017
32. Invasion (Part 1 of 5), December 27, 2017
33. Invasion (Part 2 of 5), January 31, 2018
34. Invasion (Part 3 of 5), March 21, 2018
35. Invasion (Part 4 of 5), May 9, 2018
36. Invasion (Part 5 of 5), June 27, 2018
37. A Father's Love, December 19, 2018
38. Surrounded, January 23, 2019
39. Infiltration, February 27, 2019
40. The Darkness Grows, March 27, 2019
41. Betrayed, May 1, 2019
42. Shining Too Brightly, August 7, 2019
43. The Merged, December 25, 2019
44. The Merged Part 2, January 29, 2020
45. The Merged Part 3, May 20, 2020
46. The Merged Part 4, September 16, 2020
47. The Merged Part 5, December 23, 2020
48. The Merged Part 6, April 28, 2021

== Collected editions ==
Outcast trade paperbacks
Title	Material collected	Publication date	ISBN
Outcast: Volume 1 – A Darkness Surrounds Him	Outcast #1–6	January 28, 2015	978-1-63215-053-0
Outcast: Volume 2 – A Vast and Unending Ruin	Outcast #7–12	October 7, 2015	978-1-63215-448-4
Outcast: Volume 3 – This Little Light	Outcast #13–18	June 21, 2016	978-1-63215-693-8
Outcast: Volume 4 – Under Devil's Wing	Outcast #19–24	February 21, 2017	978-1-5343-0050-7
Outcast: Volume 5 – The New Path	Outcast #25–30	October 24, 2017	978-1-5343-0249-5
Outcast: Volume 6 – Invasion	Outcast #31–36	July 31, 2018	978-1-5343-0751-3
Outcast: Volume 7 – The Darkness Grows	Outcast #37–42	July 30, 2019	978-1-5343-1239-5
Outcast: Volume 8 - The Merged	Outcast #43–48	June 1, 2021	978-1-5343-1604-1

Outcast deluxe hardcovers
Title	Material collected	Publication date	ISBN
Outcast: Book One	Outcast #1–12	November 8, 2016	978-1-5343-0091-0
Outcast: Book Two	Outcast #13–24	November 29, 2017	978-1-5343-0439-0
Outcast: Book Three	Outcast #25–36	July 2, 2019	978-1-5343-1230-2
Outcast: Book Four	Outcast #37–48	June 30, 2021	978-1-5343-1710-9

== Television adaptation ==
Cinemax picked up the rights to produce a show based on the comic in 2013. Ten episodes were announced to be produced with Patrick Fugit (Kyle Barnes) and Philip Glenister (Reverend Anderson) as the leading roles for the television series, which premiered in June 2016.

== Reception ==
The first issue of the comic was released in June 2014 to positive reviews.
