= Maur-Konn =

Publication information
- Publisher: Marvel Comics
- First appearance: Shogun Warriors #1 (February 1979)
- Created by: Doug Moench and Herb Trimpe

In-story information
- Species: Myndai

Maur-Konn is a fictional character appearing in American comic books published by Marvel Comics.

== Publication history ==
Maur-Konn first appeared in Shogun Warriors #1 (February 1979), and was created by Doug Moench and Herb Trimpe.

== Fictional character biography ==
Maur-Konn was the leader on Earth of the Myndai in modern times. The Myndai were once members of the federation of alien races called the Charter (along with the Lem, Lumina, and Nanda). They were engaged in a galaxy-wide war with the Lumina, and some were placed on Earth in suspended animation eons ago as sleeper agents. Maur-Konn was the leader of the Followers of Darkness, who opposed and eventually killed the last remaining Followers of the Light on Earth. Maur-Konn is later arrested with the assistance of the Invisible Woman.

Maur-Konn was also a former ally of Doctor Demonicus, to whom he gave his satellite headquarters.

== Powers and abilities ==
Maur-Konn had advanced scientific knowledge regarding genetics.
