= Firefall (comics) =

Marvel fictional characters

Firefall is the name of fictional characters appearing in American comic books published by Marvel Comics. The first character two be known as Firefall first appeared in Rom #2 (January 1980), while the second one first appeared in Rom #4 (March 1980).

== Fictional character biography ==
Archie Stryker was a criminal who bonded with the Galadorian Spaceknight armor of Firefall.

Karas was a Galadorian Spaceknight who was also named Firefall.
