= Robert Kirkman =

American comic book writer

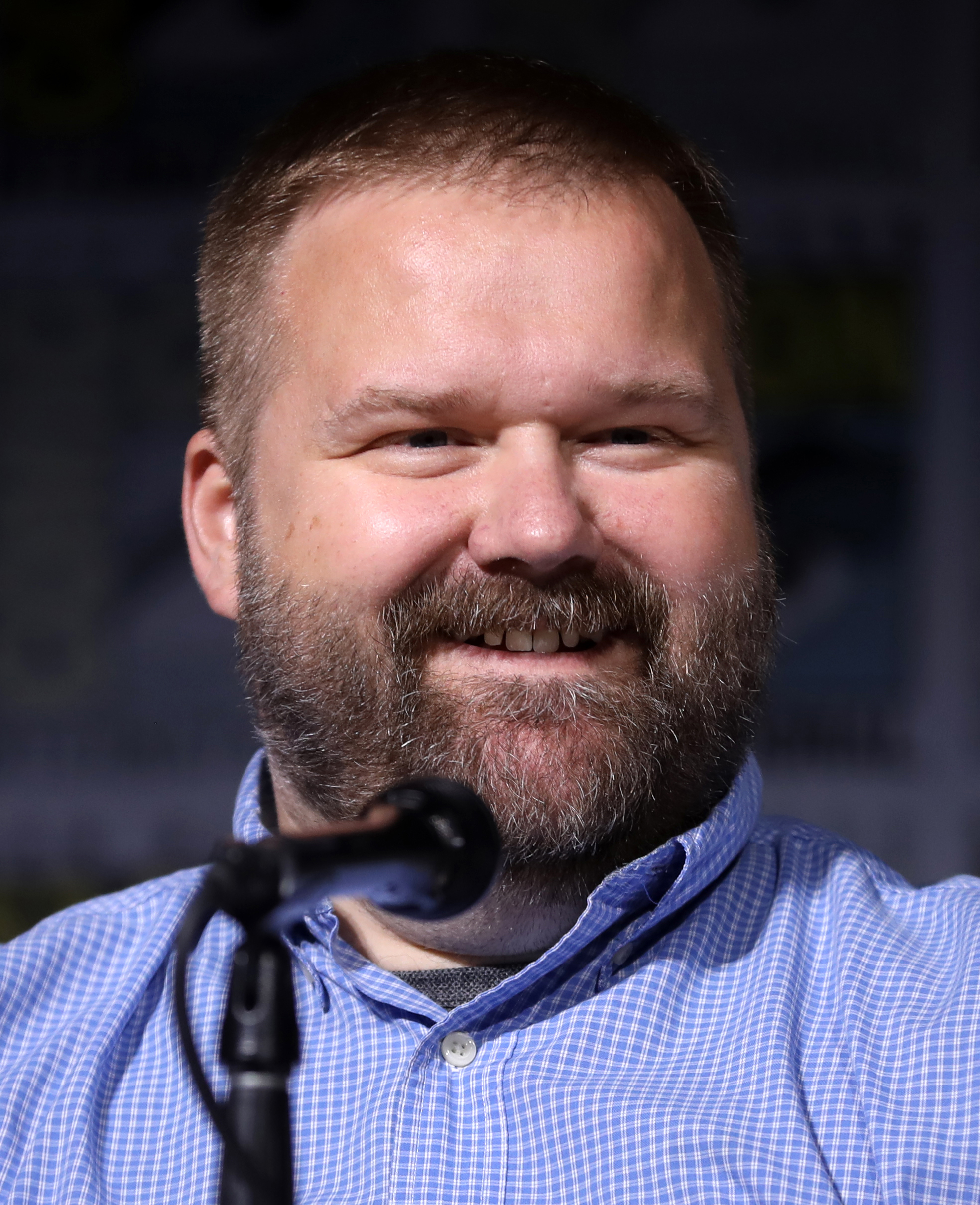
- Kirkman at the 2023 San Diego Comic-Con
- Born: November 30, 1978 (age 47) Lexington, Kentucky, U.S.
- Areas: Writer, publisher, producer
- Notable works: Battle Pope; Invincible; The Walking Dead; Marvel Zombies; Irredeemable Ant-Man; Outcast; Oblivion Song; Fire Power; Thief of Thieves; Energon Universe
- Awards: Inkpot Award (2012)
- Spouse: Sonia Kirkman
- Children: 2

Robert Kirkman (/ˈkɜːrkmən/; born November 30, 1978) is an American comic book writer, screenwriter, and producer. He is best known for co-creating The Walking Dead, Invincible, Tech Jacket, Outcast, Oblivion Song, and Fire Power for Image Comics, in addition to writing Ultimate X-Men, Irredeemable Ant-Man and Marvel Zombies for Marvel Comics. He has also collaborated with Image Comics co-founder Todd McFarlane on the series Haunt.

He is one of the five partners of Image Comics currently serving as COO, and the only one of the five who was not one of its co-founders.

In 2010, Kirkman co-founded the entertainment company Skybound Entertainment in order to develop properties in traditional and new media, including comics, television, and film. The company also manages the license for The Walking Dead and Invincible. In 2018, Skybound expanded his own video game division under Skybound Games to develop video games based on its intellectual property.

Kirkman is also known for creating and producing the television series Outcast and Invincible, both adaptations of his own comic book series. He has also written a number of episodes for The Walking Dead and Fear the Walking Dead. He is executive producer of the AMC series Robert Kirkman's Secret History of Comics, and the Korean pre-apocalyptic drama, Five Year.

== Early life ==
Kirkman was born November 30, 1978, in Lexington, Kentucky, and was raised in Cynthiana, Kentucky.

Kirkman grew as a fan of zombie films such as the Night of the Living Dead series and Zombi 2, as well as zombie video games such as Resident Evil.

== Career ==
His first comic book work was the 2000 superhero parody Battle Pope, which he co-created with artist Tony Moore, self-published under the Funk-O-Tron label, and was adapted into a season of 8 animated webisodes that appeared on Spike TV's website in 2008. Later, while pitching a new series, Science Dog, Kirkman and artist Cory Walker were hired to do a SuperPatriot miniseries for Image Comics. While working on that book, Kirkman and E. J. Su created the 2002 Image series Tech Jacket, which ran six issues, and the one-shot title, Cloudfall.

In 2003, Kirkman and Walker created Invincible for Image's new superhero line. The story surrounded the adolescent son of the world's most powerful superhero, who develops powers and starts his own superhero career. Walker later failed to meet the monthly title's deadlines and was replaced by Ryan Ottley. In 2005, Paramount Pictures announced it had bought the rights to produce an Invincible feature film, and hired Kirkman to write the screenplay. However, due to a lack of significant development, the rights expired and reverted to Kirkman.

Shortly after the launch of Invincible, Kirkman and Moore began The Walking Dead (2003). Kirkman said in 2012 that Image had balked at publishing a comics series featuring what it felt was simply another zombie story, prompting him to say the zombies were part of an alien plot—a notion he had no intention of using except as a means of selling the project. Artist Charlie Adlard replaced Tony Moore with issue #7. Moore continued to draw covers until issue 24 as well as the first four volumes of the trade paperbacks for the series.

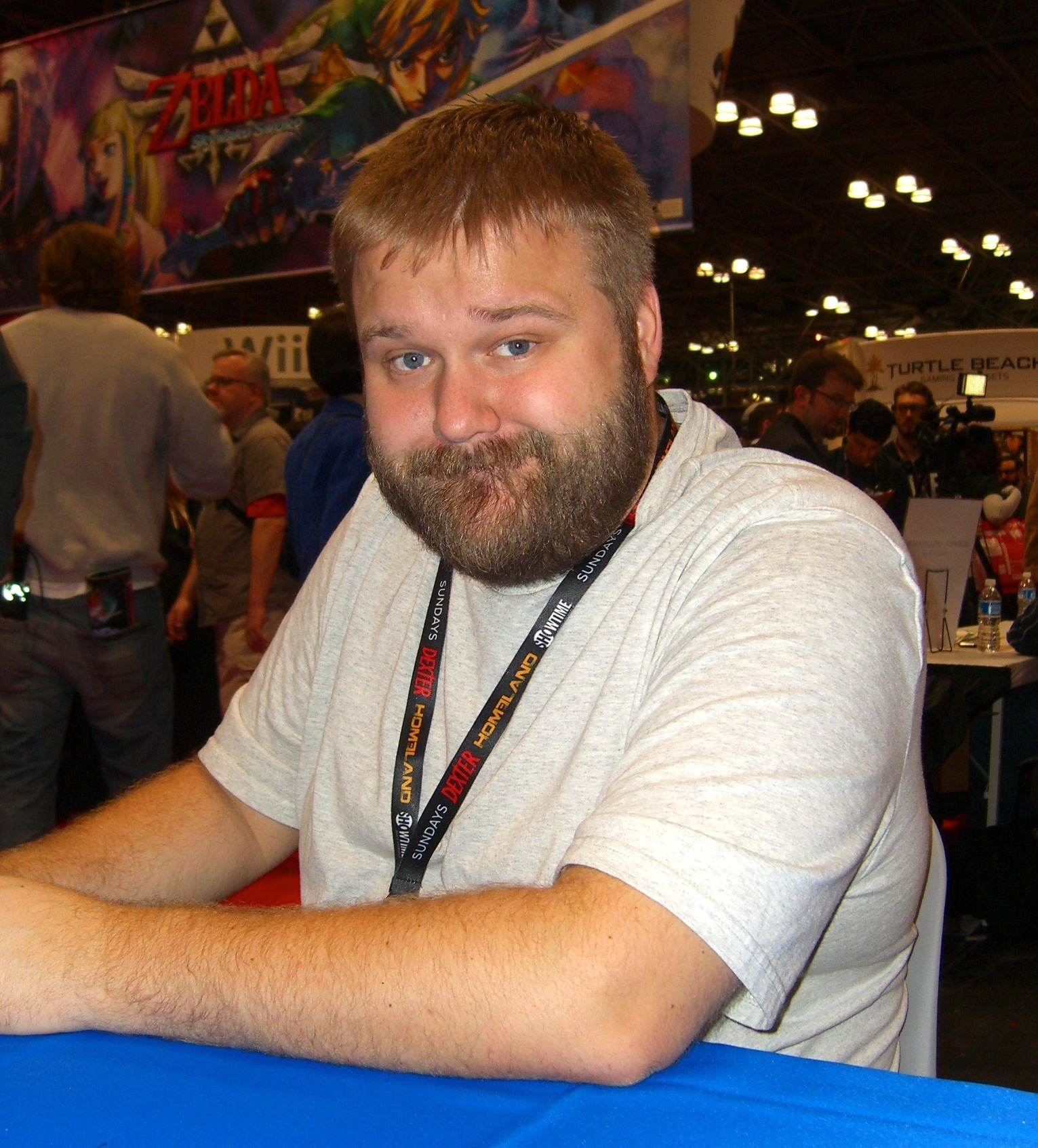
Kirkman at the 2011 New York Comic Con

In 2003, Kirkman was hired by Marvel Comics to pen a revival of the 1990s Sleepwalker series, but it was canceled before being published; the contents of its first issue were included in Epic Anthology No. 1 (2004). He soon became a mainstay at Marvel, writing the "Avengers Disassembled" issues of Captain America vol. 4, 2004's Marvel Knights 2099 one-shots event, Jubilee #1–6 and Fantastic Four: Foes #1–6, a two-year run on Ultimate X-Men and the entire Marvel Team-Up vol. 3 and the Irredeemable Ant-Man miniseries. He continued his exploration of zombies by creating the series Marvel Zombies, in which an alternative Marvel universe's superheroes become zombies.

At Image, Kirkman and artist Jason Howard created the ongoing series The Astounding Wolf-Man, launching it on May 5, 2007, as part of Free Comic Book Day. Kirkman edited the monthly series Brit, based on the character he created for the series of one-shots, illustrated by Moore and Cliff Rathburn. It ran 12 issues.

Kirkman announced in 2007 that he and artist Rob Liefeld would team on a revival of Killraven for Marvel Comics. Kirkman that year also said he and Todd McFarlane would collaborate on Haunt for Image Comics.

In late July 2008, Kirkman was made a partner at Image Comics, thereby ending his freelance association with Marvel. Nonetheless, later in 2009, he and Walker produced the five-issue miniseries The Destroyer vol. 4 for Marvel's MAX imprint.

In 2009, Kirkman and Marc Silvestri took over the 2009–2010 Pilot Season for Top Cow Comics. The 2009/2010 Pilot Season contains a series of five one-shot pilot comics that readers will be able to vote on which becomes an ongoing series. Each series is co-created by Silvestri who also provides cover art.

In 2010, he also began producing the television adaption of his comic book series The Walking Dead, the pilot of which was directed by Frank Darabont. Kirkman has written or co-written seven episodes of the series. Kirkman also created and serves as an executive producer on the show's companion series, Fear the Walking Dead.

In July 2010, Kirkman announced he would launch and run a new Image Comics imprint called Skybound Entertainment.

On February 9, 2012, Tony Moore filed a lawsuit alleging that Kirkman, in 2005, had deceitfully engineered him into surrendering his rights to The Walking Dead comic book and eventual TV series in exchange for payments that never materialized. Kirkman said in a statement the following day that he and Moore "each had legal representation seven years ago and now he is violating the same contract he initiated and approved and he wants to misrepresent the fees he was paid and continues to be paid for the work he was hired to do." Kirkman in turn sued Moore. On September 24, 2012, the two released a joint statement saying they had reached a settlement "to everyone's mutual satisfaction."

Kirkman made an appearance in a 2012 episode of Adult Swim's Robot Chicken as himself where he tries to tell The Nerd and Daniel a hint, but gets eaten by zombies.

In November 2013, Cinemax purchased a TV pilot based on Kirkman and artist Paul Azaceta's then-upcoming six-issue exorcism comics miniseries, Outcast. The first issue of the comic was released in June 2014 to positive reviews.

Kirkman was a producer of the science fiction thriller Air, which starred The Walking Dead's Norman Reedus, and Djimon Hounsou. The film was released in 2015. It was the first feature film to be produced by Skybound Entertainment.

Around November 7, 2016, Kirkman's production company Skybound Entertainment was set to produce a remake of the film An American Werewolf in London. The remake was to be written and directed by Max Landis, son of the original director John Landis. Kirkman and David Alpert would be executive producers on the film. However, after the sexual misconduct allegations against Landis, it is currently unknown if it is still happening.

On April 4, 2017, it was announced that Seth Rogen and Evan Goldberg would direct/write/produce a live-action adaptation of Invincible for Universal Pictures, with Kirkman also serving as a producer on the project. In 2021, Kirkman reaffirmed that the project was still in the works.

In 2018, it was announced that Amazon Prime Video had given a series order for an animated adaptation of Invincible for a first season consisting of eight episodes. Robert Kirkman and Simon Racioppa serve as co-showrunners. Kirkman and Racioppa are also executive producers alongside David Alpert, Margaret M. Dean, Catherine Winder, Seth Rogen, and Evan Goldberg. Helen Leigh and Cory Walker serve as co-executive producers. The series is produced by Skybound Animation Studio and stars Steven Yeun, J. K. Simmons, Sandra Oh, Mark Hamill, Seth Rogen, Gillian Jacobs, Andrew Rannells, Zazie Beetz, Walton Goggins, Jason Mantzoukas, Zachary Quinto, Khary Payton, Chris Diamantopoulos, Malese Jow, Kevin Michael Richardson, and Grey Griffin. In July 2025, the series was renewed through season five.

Kirkman pitched the story for Renfield, a horror-comedy about Count Dracula's henchman Renfield. The film was announced by Universal Pictures in November 2019. It is directed by Chris McKay and stars Nicholas Hoult and Nicolas Cage as Renfield and Dracula, respectively.

In February 2023, it was announced that Kirkman would reunite with Lorenzo De Felici to launch Void Rivals, a new series that would kick-off a new shared comic universe. In June 2023, it was later revealed that the book would launch the Energon Universe and that Kirkman's production company, Skybound, would publish comics based on Transformers and G.I. Joe.

Terminal, a superhero comic series was announced in February 2026 with the release date of July 22 of the same year. Kirkman is co-writing it alongside Joe Casey.

== Personal life ==
Kirkman and his wife lived in Kentucky until 2011. Their son was born on April 25, 2006.

Kirkman and his family currently live in Los Angeles having moved there in 2011.

== Accolades ==
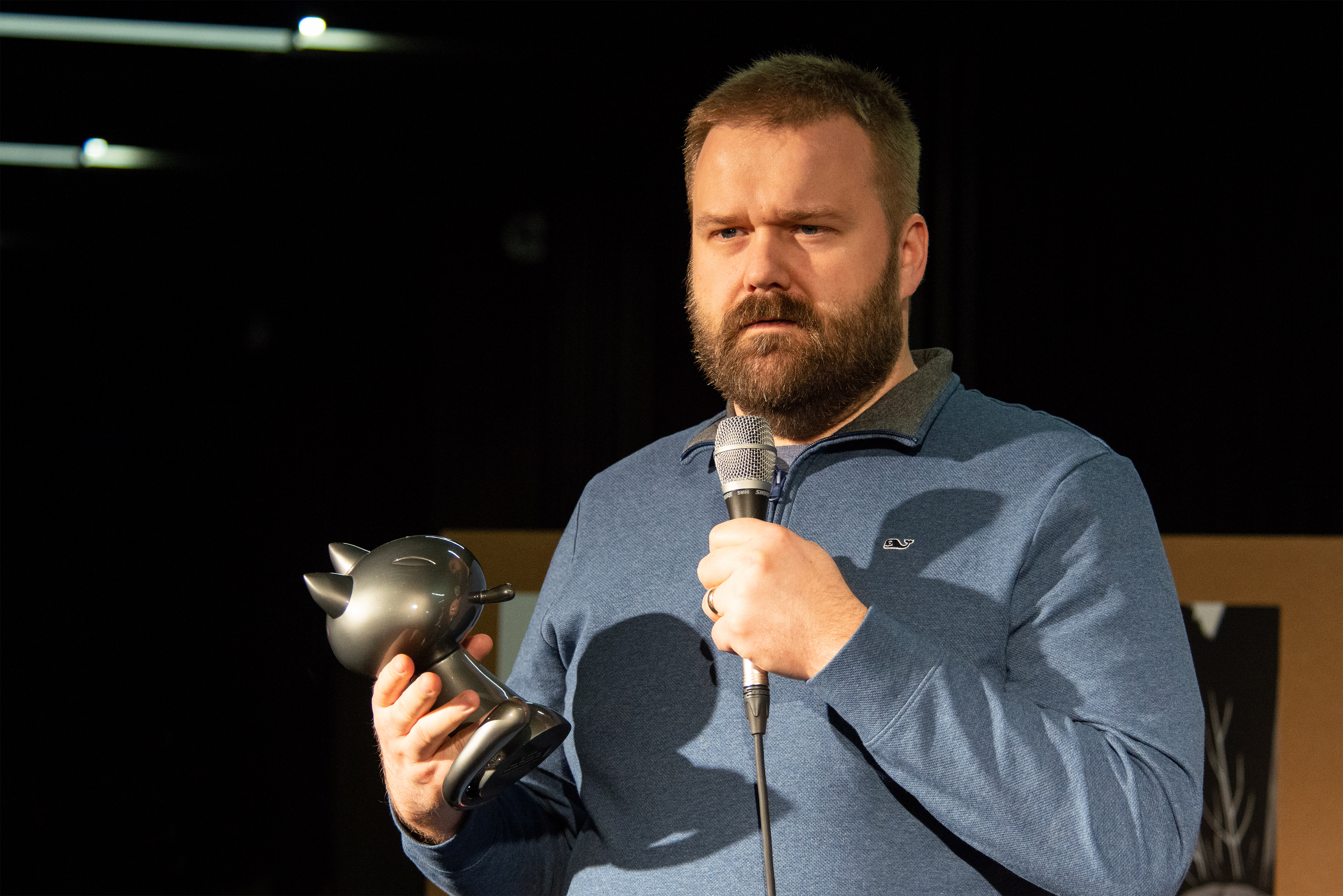
Robert Kirkman with the Fauve d'honneur at the 2020 Angoulême International Comics Festival

In 2010, Kirkman's comic series The Walking Dead received the Eisner Award for Best Continuing Series. In 2012, he received a special Innovator Award at the Saturn Awards for his work adapting his comic books to the screen as well as serving as executive producer of The Walking Dead.

The Walking Dead television series garnered nominations for Best New Series and Best Television Series Drama at the Writers Guild of America Awards 2011 and the 68th Golden Globe Awards. The show clinched prestigious honors including Television Program of the Year by the American Film Institute in 2010 and 2012, along with IGN's Best Horror Series in 2012 and 2016. Additionally, it secured two Emmy Awards for Outstanding Prosthetic Makeup in 2011 and 2012.

In 2020, he was granted a special award ("Fauve d'honneur") at the Angoulême International Comics Festival for his overall achievement.

== Bibliography ==
Title	Issues	Publication date
Battle Pope	#1–14	2000–2002
Tech Jacket	#1–8	2002–2014
Invincible	#1–144	2003–2018
Capes	#1–3	2003–2003
Brit	#1–3	2003–2004
The Walking Dead	#1–193	2003–2019
Marvel Zombies: Dead Days	#1	2006–2008
Marvel Zombies	#1–5	2006–2008
Marvel Zombies 2	#1–5	2006–2008
The Irredeemable Ant-Man	#1–12	2006–2007
The Astounding Wolf-Man	#1–25	2007–2010
Image United	#1–3	2009–2010
Super Dinosaur	#1–23	2011–2014
Tech Jacket Digital	#1–3	2014–2014
Tech Jacket	#1–12	2014–2015
Outcast	#1–48	2014–2021
Oblivion Song	#1–36	2018–2022
Die!Die!Die!	#1-14	2018–2021
Fire Power	#1–30	2020–2024
Void Rivals	#1–ongoing	2023–Present
Blood & Thunder	#1–ongoing	2025–Present
Battle Beast	#1–ongoing	2025–Present
Skinbreaker	#1–8	2025–2026
Transformers	#25–ongoing	2025–Present
Capes (Remaster)	#1–6	2025–Present
Terminal	#1–ongoing	2026–Present

== Filmography ==
=== Films ===
Year	Title	Writer	Producer
2015	Air	No	Yes
2023	Renfield	Story	Yes

=== Television ===
==== The Walking Dead ====
Kirkman has written a number of The Walking Dead TV episodes.

- 1.04 – "Vatos"
- 2.01 – "What Lies Ahead" (co-written with Ardeth Bey)
- 2.13 – "Beside the Dying Fire" (co-written with Glen Mazzara)
- 3.08 – "Made to Suffer"
- 4.03 – "Isolation"
- 4.09 – "After"
- 5.02 – "Strangers"

==== Fear the Walking Dead ====
Fear the Walking Dead is a companion series to The Walking Dead, set in Los Angeles, California and starting prior to the apocalypse. Robert Kirkman is co-creator of the series alongside Dave Erickson. He is also an executive producer and has co-written episodes of the series.

- 1.01 – "Pilot" (co-written with Dave Erickson)
- 1.06 – "The Good Man" (co-written with Dave Erickson)

==== Outcast ====
Outcast is a horror series based on the comic series of the same name on Cinemax.

- 1.01 – "A Darkness Surrounds Him"
- 1.04 – "A Wrath Unseen"

==== Invincible ====
Invincible is an animated adaptation of the comic series of the same name on Amazon Prime Video. Kirkman, in addition to serving as creator, co-showrunner, and executive producer, also wrote episodes for the series.

- 1.01 – "It's About Time"
- 1.08 – "Where I Really Come From"
- Special – "Invincible: Atom Eve" (co-written with Helen Leigh)
- 2.08 – "I Thought You Were Stronger"
- 3.07 – "What Have I Done?"
- 3.08 – "I Thought You'd Never Shut Up"
- 4.04 – "Hurm"

Preceded by Kurt Busiek; Brandon Thomas	Youngblood writer 2004	Succeeded by Joe Casey
Preceded by Robert Morales	Captain America writer 2004	Succeeded by Ed Brubaker
Preceded by Tom Peyer; Glenn Herdling	Marvel Team-Up writer 2004–2006	Succeeded by Eve Ewing
Preceded by Brian K. Vaughan	Ultimate X-Men writer 2006–2008	Succeeded by Aron Eli Coleite
