= Dire Wraith =

Fictional species appearing in Rom the Spaceknight comics

- A Dire Wraith, art by John Romita Jr. & Dan Green

Publication information
- Publisher: Marvel Comics; IDW Publishing
- First appearance: Rom #1 (December 1979)
- Created by: Bill Mantlo (writer); Al Milgrom (artist)

Characteristics
- Place of origin: Skrullos, Wraithworld, Dark Nebula
- Pantheon: Avoe
- Inherent abilities: Superhuman strength Shapeshifting; Magic usage

The Dire Wraiths are a fictional extraterrestrial species appearing in American comic books published by Marvel Comics and IDW Publishing. The Dire Wraiths are the main opponents of Rom the Space Knight.

== Publication history ==
The Dire Wraiths first appeared in Rom #1 (1979) and were created by Bill Mantlo and Al Milgrom. Parker Brothers created the term Dire Wraiths to promote the original ROM toy, but Marvel developed all of the prehistory and art behind them. Hasbro has since taken over ownership and trademarked the name. IDW Publishing developed a new look and history different from that previously created by Marvel, which still owns those aspects.

== Species biography ==
=== Marvel Universe ===
The Dire Wraiths are an evolutionary offshoot of the Skrulls from the Andromeda Galaxy. Like the Skrulls, the Wraiths are shapeshifters, able to take the forms of other creatures. The Wraiths were originally depicted as amorphous, cloudy, vaguely human-shaped beings, but was eventually revealed that it was a transitional form used for shape-shifting and that their true form is entirely different. The Dire Wraiths are Skrullian Deviants engineered by the star-faring Celestials. The Wraiths have both reptilian and mammalian traits. The females lay eggs and lactate.

Most characters consider Wraiths to be sexually dimorphic. All Wraiths have the same form, but the males are ashamed of their true form and use their shape-shifting abilities to constantly appear in their transitory forms. The basic transitory form is stocky and troll-like in appearance, with red or brown skin, but otherwise roughly human-like in size and shape. The true form has a large, reddish body with large, pupil-less eyes, small beaks, 'hands' that resemble small pincers and tentacles; clawed feet, and thick tails. Wraiths have long, drill-like tongues that they use to suck out the brains of their victims, allowing them to gain their memories. All Wraiths can copy the appearance of other beings without consuming their brains or killing them.

Wraiths turned into dust when killed (or banished to Limbo).

==== In-universe origins ====
At some point in their history, female Dire Wraiths began to study evil magic. This caused a rift with their parent race, the Skrulls, and they were driven out of the Andromeda Galaxy. They settled on the planet Wraithworld.

==== The Dark Nebula ====
Two hundred years before the events of the main comic strip, the Dire Wraiths launched an offensive on Galador and the galaxy in which it was located. Upon arriving at Galador, the Wraiths learned that hundreds of young Galadorians had been transformed into cyborg warriors called Spaceknights, who repelled the attack. The Dire Wraiths returned to Wraithworld, only to have Rom, the greatest of the Spaceknights, follow them there, intent on wiping them from the universe. Realizing that other Spaceknights would soon follow, the Wraiths decided to abandon Wraithworld, and scattered across the universe.

==== Wraiths on Earth ====
Several decades prior to Rom's arrival on Earth, a large group of Wraiths landed near a small town in West Virginia. The Wraiths infiltrated the town in human form, and later began to infiltrate governments and other important organizations across the world. Because Dire Wraith magic was fueled by the black sun of Wraithworld in the Dark Nebula, their ability to perform magic on Earth was severely impaired. Consequently, the male-dominated technology faction of the Wraiths was in control.

Later, Rom landed near Clairton, having detected a Wraith infestation, and with the help of some of the locals, eventually succeeded in banishing all the Wraiths there. Then he proceeded to travel around the world looking for the rest, eventually leaving the protection of Clairton to the human superhero, the Torpedo.

Eventually the female-dominated faction of magic-oriented Wraiths, blaming the technology faction for failing to defeat Rom, launched a coup and then proceeded to attack Earth openly. Their first act was to kill the entire population of Clairton while Rom was away. Later they openly attacked S.H.I.E.L.D. at their headquarters, the Helicarrier. This proved a major blunder in that the personnel were able to repel the attack and all doubt by the authorities as to the existence and threat of the alien species was removed.

Soon afterwards, the Wraiths launched a plan to help them conquer Earth once and for all; they cast a spell on Earth's sun, allowing them to use its energies to draw Wraithworld into the Solar System. This greatly increased their magical powers. Emboldened, the Wraiths made a mass attack on New York City, where they clashed with dozens of the city's superheroes. Thanks to Rom, however, who used a special satellite to boost the power of his Neutralizer, Wraithworld in its entirety was banished into Limbo, causing all Wraiths in this galaxy to lose their powers, including apparently their shape-shifting abilities. Subsequently, Rom banishes all the defeated Wraiths into Limbo.

The Wraith queen Volx later made appearances in issues of New Warriors and Nova (vol. 2). It was later confirmed that this is the same Wraith queen introduced in Rom #48.

==== Return of the Wraiths ====
A salvaged Dire Wraith ship is used as a Moscow headquarters for the Russian superheroes of the Winter Guard. Fantasma was revealed to have been a Dire Wraith Queen in Darkstar & the Winter Guard #2.

In the 2011 Annihilators miniseries, a team of Skrulls try to bring back Wraithworld and its population, intending to empower them and use them as a weapon to reform the Skrull Empire. The Wraith's Queen Volx and the Galadorians both are manipulated into setting this up, and the Annihilators find that Wraithworld has to be brought back to reality to balance out the unleashed Dark Sun. The Silver Surfer discovers that Volx has been driven insane by an empathic link to Wraithworld in Limbo. When the Annihilators arrive there, the team is horrified to find out that after generations in Limbo, the surviving Dire Wraiths are a disease-ridden, half-starved people in constant anguish and most of them are suicidal.

The Dire Wraiths later appear as a member of the Universal Inhumans alongside the Badoon, Centaurians, and the Kymellians.

=== Standalone comic series ===
The Dire Wraiths received their own comic book series, which has received mixed reviews. While the characterization of the comic was praised, its cartoonish art style was heavily criticized.

== Dire Wraith characters ==
The following lists some of the more notable Dire Wraith characters:

- Avoe is the queen of the Dire Wraiths and member of the Universal Inhumans.
- Doctor Dredd is a rare male Dire Wraith warlock.
- Hooud is a size-shifting Dire Wraith who is a member of the Universal Inhumans' Light Brigade. He operates under the alias of Creeping Death.
- Hybrid / Jimmy Marks is the hybrid offspring of a human and Dire Wraith.
- Kattan-Tu is a Dire Wraith orphan who was raised by the Sarkans, a childless human couple, that named him Jimmy.
- Voorr is a Dire Wraith who is a member of the Universal Inhumans' Light Brigade. He operates under the alias of Sun. Voorr can fly and project force fields.

== Reception ==
The Dire Wraiths have been criticized as being "evil for evil's sake" and as having a thin motivation for their actions.
