= Oblivion Song =

Comic book series

- Cover art for the first issue of Oblivion Song, published in March 2018

Publication information
- Publisher: Image Comics
- Schedule: Monthly
- Format: Ongoing series
- Genre: Science fiction
- Publication date: March 2018 – June 2022
- No. of issues: 36

Creative team
- Created by: Robert Kirkman
- Written by: Robert Kirkman
- Artist: Lorenzo De Felici
- Letterer: Rus Wooton
- Colorist: Annalisa Leoni
- Editor: Sean Mackiewicz

Oblivion Song is an American comic book series created by writer Robert Kirkman and artist Lorenzo De Felici, which debuted by Image Comics in 2018, and concluded with its 36th issue in June 2022.

== Overview ==
Oblivion Song is a supernatural science fiction story that chronicles Nathan Cole, a man who makes daily trips to try to rescue those still living in the apocalyptic hellscape of Oblivion, a part of Philadelphia lost a decade ago along with 300,000 of its citizens.

The series holds an average critic rating of 7.7 out of 10 at the review aggregator website Comic Book Roundup.

== Film adaptation ==
In June 2019, it was revealed that Universal Pictures and Skybound Entertainment would produce an Oblivion Song movie with Sean O’Keefe writing the script. In August 2021, it was announced that Jake Gyllenhaal would star in and produce the film under his Nine Stories Productions banner.

== Collected editions ==
Title	Material collected	Publication date	ISBN
Oblivion Song, Chapter 1	Oblivion Song #1–6	September 12, 2018	978-1534306424
Oblivion Song, Chapter 2	Oblivion Song #7–12	March 13, 2019	978-1534310575
Oblivion Song, Chapter 3	Oblivion Song #13–18	September 11, 2019	978-1534313262
Oblivion Song, Chapter 4	Oblivion Song #19–24	March 18, 2020	978-1534315174
Oblivion Song, Chapter 5	Oblivion Song #25–30	March 24, 2021	978-1534317284
Oblivion Song, Chapter 6	Oblivion Song #31–36	July 13, 2022	978-1534322998
Oblivion Song, Book 1	Oblivion Song #1–12	July 8, 2020	978-1534316881
Oblivion Song, Book 2	Oblivion Song #13–24	July 14, 2021	978-1534319509
Oblivion Song, Book 3	Oblivion Song #25–36	October 5, 2022	978-1534322318
Oblivion Song by Kirkman & De Felici Compendium	Oblivion Song #1-36	August 9, 2023	ISBN 978-1534398603
