= Bill Mantlo =

American comic book writer

- Promotional image of Mantlo from the 1978 Marvel Comics Calendar
- Born: William Timothy Mantlo; November 9, 1951 (age 75) New York City, U.S.
- Area: Writer
- Notable works: Rocket Raccoon; Cloak and Dagger; Rom: Spaceknight; The Micronauts; The Incredible Hulk
- Awards: Eagle Award (1979)
- Spouse: Karen Pocock

William Timothy Mantlo (born November 9, 1951) is an American comic book writer, primarily at Marvel Comics. He is best known for his work on two licensed toy properties whose adventures occurred in the Marvel Universe: Micronauts and Rom, as well as co-creating the characters Rocket Raccoon and Cloak and Dagger. An attorney who worked as a public defender, Mantlo was the victim of a hit-and-run accident in 1992 that left him with severe brain damage and has been in institutional care ever since.

== Early life ==
Bill Mantlo was born in Brooklyn, New York City, the oldest of three sons of William W. and Nancy Mantlo. Growing up as a comics fan, Mantlo attended Manhattan's High School of Art & Design. In college at the Cooper Union School of Art, he focused on painting and photography. Following his graduation, Mantlo held various civil service positions and worked as a portrait photographer.

== Career ==
=== Comics ===
A connection with a college friend in 1974 led Mantlo to a job as an assistant to Marvel Comics production manager John Verpoorten. Mantlo's first credits were as a colorist, on several comics cover-dated from October 1974 to April 1975. Soon afterward, Mantlo wrote a fill-in script for a Sons of the Tiger story in Deadly Hands of Kung Fu, which led to a permanent writing position on that title. While scripting Deadly Hands, Mantlo and artist George Pérez created White Tiger, comics' first superhero of Hispanic descent.

Around this time, Marvel's then editor-in-chief Marv Wolfman instituted a policy to avoid the many missed deadlines plaguing the company. The policy was to have fill-in stories at the ready, should a title be in danger of missing its deadline. Mantlo quickly became the "fill-in king", creating stories under very tight deadlines, many of which did find their way into print. Wolfman explained that Mantlo "was both good and fast and at that point didn't have a lot of regular assignments." By the mid to late 1970s he had written issues of nearly every Marvel title.

Later, he became a regular writer at Marvel, notably for the licensed properties Micronauts and Rom, also known as Rom: Spaceknight. Mantlo recalled how one Christmas, he examined some action figures from Mego Corporation's Micronauts line, given to his son Adam. He said he began to envision the characters "as small, microscopic even, inhabiting an other-verse apart from, but conjunctive with ours," and specified that,

Space Glider seemed to suggest a Reed Richards nobility, an aspect of command, of dignity. Acroyear, faceless, his armor gleaming, a fantastic sword clenched in his coldly metallic hand, seemed to hearken back to a warrior Mr. Spock. For some reason Galactic Warrior seemed insect-like – I can almost hear clicks and whistles and strange scraping interjected into his speech. But Time Traveler – there was a mystery there, glimmerings of cosmic vastness, intimations of knowledge and space and time all having been broken down and reassembled to produce something entirely new, unexplainable, different.

Mantlo convinced then-editor-in-chief Jim Shooter to obtain the comics license for these toys; Shooter then hired Mantlo to script their series. Mantlo and artist Michael Golden created the Micronauts' backstory of history, mythology, personalities, and an alphabet. Micronauts, along with Moon Knight and Ka-Zar the Savage, became one of Marvel's first ongoing series to be distributed exclusively to comic book stores beginning with issue #38 (Feb. 1982).

Mantlo's first run on The Spectacular Spider-Man featured frequent appearances by the White Tiger. He used the series to wrap up unresolved plot elements from The Champions series and wrote a multiple-issue storyline that included the first work by artist Frank Miller on the Daredevil character. Mantlo concluded his first run on the series with a crossover with the Fantastic Four #218 (May 1980). Mantlo, Mark Gruenwald, and Steven Grant co-wrote Marvel Treasury Edition #25 (1980) which featured a new story starring Spider-Man vs. the Hulk set at the 1980 Winter Olympics.

While writing The Champions he collaborated with artist Bob Hall, who said in 2013, "Bill was a peach – very helpful to me as I got started [in the comics profession] ... I think we were both as enthusiastic as we could get about this particular comic, but more because we were working at Marvel than because of the book itself."

Mantlo began writing The Incredible Hulk with issue #245 (March 1980). His five-year run on the series was noted for his depiction of the Hulk as highly emotional and humanized, rather than bestial and savage. Among the adversaries he created for the series were the U-Foes and the Soviet Super-Soldiers. Summarizing his early years with the Hulk, Mantlo remarked, "I did retreads of old Hulk stories to try and find a new direction, and just kept doing more and more repetition of what had already happened. Then [editor] Al Milgrom said, 'Well, don't accept this. If you want to make changes, make them. Take some risks.' That's when we decided to give Hulk Bruce Banner's intelligence. From that point on I felt as if I had finally had a direction and control over the character. So I guess I took a year and half or maybe two years to get to the point."

In 1983, Marvel released The Incredible Hulk #286, entitled "Hero", written by Mantlo. Three issues later, Marvel announced that Mantlo had adapted "Hero" from "Soldier", an episode of The Outer Limits by Harlan Ellison, but that they had forgotten to credit Ellison until this was pointed out by readers. In actuality, then-Editor-in-Chief Jim Shooter signed off on the story, not having seen the Outer Limits episode it was based on and not realizing Mantlo copied it. The day the issue went on sale, Shooter was contacted by an angry Ellison, who calmed down after Shooter admitted the error. Although he could have claimed hundreds of thousands of dollars in damages, Ellison requested only the same payment Mantlo had received for the story, proper credit as writer, and a lifetime subscription to everything Marvel published.

Mantlo and artist Ed Hannigan co-created the superhero pair Cloak and Dagger in The Spectacular Spider-Man #64 (March 1982). Mantlo, Gruenwald, and Grant reunited to co-write Marvel Super Hero Contest of Champions, the first limited series published by Marvel Comics. Other work by Mantlo includes runs as the regular writer on Iron Man and Alpha Flight.

=== Public defender ===
By the mid-1980s, he was enrolled at Brooklyn Law School, graduating in 1987. Though he continued writing for Marvel, his workload began to decrease due to disputes with management. He wrote briefly for DC Comics in 1988, scripting the Invasion! miniseries. By this time he had passed the bar exam, and in 1987 began working as a Legal Aid Society public defender in The Bronx.

== Personal life ==
Mantlo was married to Karen Mantlo (née Pocock), for some years a letterer in the comics industry. They have a son, Adam, and a daughter, Corinna (born 1980).

On July 17, 1992, Mantlo was struck by a car while rollerblading. The driver of the car fled the scene and was never identified. Mantlo suffered severe head trauma. According to his biographer, cartoonist David Yurkovich, in 2006, "For a while Bill was comatose. Although no longer in a coma, the brain damage he suffered in the accident is irreparable. His activities of daily living are severely curtailed and he resides in a healthcare facility where he receives full-time care."

In 2007 and again in 2010, the Portland, Oregon-based retailer Floating World Comics held fundraisers for Mantlo, featuring work by cartoonists celebrating Mantlo's work on Rom the Space Knight.

When Marvel Studios produced Guardians of the Galaxy, they negotiated a compensation package for the rights to Rocket Raccoon. Mantlo's brother credited this arrangement for ensuring he would have care for the rest of his life. They also arranged for Mantlo to have private screenings of that film and its sequel.

== Awards ==
Micronauts won the 1979 Eagle Award for Favourite New Comic Title.

In 2014, Mantlo received the Bill Finger Award.

== Selected bibliography ==
=== Marvel Comics ===
- Alpha Flight #29–66, Annual #1–2 (1985–1989)
- Amazing Adventures (Killraven) #33, 38 (1975–1976)
- Amazing High Adventure #4–5 (1986)
- The Amazing Spider-Man #181, 222, 237, Annual #10–11, 17 (1976–1983)
- Astonishing Tales #32–35 (1975–1976)
- The Avengers #174, 188, 206, 210, Annual #9, 12 (1978–1983)
- Battlestar Galactica #8–9 (1979)
- Captain America #256, 291 (1981–1984)
- Champions #8–17 (1976–1978)
- Cloak and Dagger (1983–1984 mini-series) #1–4, #1–11 (1985–1987 ongoing series)
- Daredevil #140 (1976)
- Deadly Hands of Kung Fu #7–14, 16–27, 29–32 (1974–1977)
- Defenders #30 (1975)
- Epic Illustrated #5 (1981)
- Fantastic Four #172, 182–183, 193–194, 216–218, Annual #13 (1976–1980)
- Fear #29–31 (1975)
- Frankenstein #18 (1975)
- Ghost Rider #16 (1976)
- Heroes for Hope: Starring the X-Men #1 (1985)
- Howard the Duck (comic book series) #30–31 (black-and-white magazine) #1–9 (1979–1981)
- Human Fly #1–19 (1977–1979)
- The Incredible Hulk #245–313, Annual #10–13 (1980–1985)
- The Incredible Hulk Versus Quasimodo #1 (1983)
- Iron Man #78, 86–87, 95–115, Annual #4 (1975–1978)
- Jack of Hearts #1–4 (1984 mini-series)
- John Carter, Warlord of Mars Annual #2 (1978)
- Man from Atlantis #1–7 (1978)
- Marvel Chillers: Modred the Mystic #1–2 (1975)
- Marvel Super Special #15 (Star Trek: The Motion Picture adaptation) (1979)
- Marvel Classics Comics #25 (adaptation of Rock & Rule), 33 (adaptation of Buckaroo Banzai)
- Marvel Fanfare #7, 16, 19, 25, 27–28, 43, 47, 56–58 (1983–1991)
- Marvel Graphic Novel #14 (1985)
- Marvel Graphic Novel: Cloak and Dagger and Power Pack: Shelter from the Storm #1 (1990)
- Marvel Graphic Novel: Cloak and Dagger: Predator and Prey #1 (1988)
- Marvel Premiere #26, 28, 31, 44 (1975–1978)
- Marvel Preview #4, 7, 10, 22, 24 (1976–1980)
- Marvel Spotlight #27 (1976)
- Marvel Spotlight vol. 2 #9–11 (1980–1981)
- Marvel Super Hero Contest of Champions #1–3 (1982)
- Marvel Super-Heroes vol. 2 #10, 15 (1992–1993)
- Marvel Super Special #25, 31, 33 (1983–1984)
- Marvel Team-Up #38–51, 53–56, 72, 134–135, 140, Annual #1, 6 (1975–1984)
- Marvel Two-in-One #11–12, 14–19, 21–24, 47–48, 99 (1975–1983)
- Micronauts #1–58, Annual #1–2 (1979–1984)
- Power Man #27, 29 (1975–1976)
- Questprobe #1 (1984)
- Rawhide Kid #1–4 (1985 mini-series)
- Red Sonja #5–7 (1985)
- Rocket Raccoon #1–4 (1985 mini-series)
- Rom #1–75, Annual #1–4 (1979–1986)
- Savage Sword of Conan #110 (1985)
- Sectaurs #1–8 (1985–1986)
- Skull the Slayer #5–8 (1976)
- Son of Satan #8 (1977)
- The Spectacular Spider-Man #6, 9–10, 12–15, 17–34, 36–40, 42, 53, 61–89, 104, 120, Annual #1, 4 (1977–1986)
- Strange Tales vol. 2 #1–6 (Note: Issue #7 credits Mantlo as the writer of the "Cloak & Dagger" story but the issue was in fact wholly written by "Dr. Strange" writer Peter B. Gillis. The letters pages in later issues corrected this error.) (1987)
- Super-Villain Team-Up #4, 9–14 (1976–1977)
- Swords of the Swashbucklers #1–12 (1985–1987)
- Tarzan #22–29, Annual #2–3 (1978–1979)
- Team America #3–9 (1982–1983)
- Thor #240–241, 309 (1975–1981)
- Transformers #1–2 (1985)
- The Vision and the Scarlet Witch #1–4 (1982–1983 mini-series)
- Web of Spider-Man #11
- What If...? #21, 31, 36 (1980–1982)
- X-Men #96, 106 (1975–1977)
- X-Men and the Micronauts #1–4 (1984 mini-series)

=== Other publishers ===
- Creepy #109 (Warren Publishing) (1979)
- Invasion! (DC Comics) (1989)

== See also ==
- Roger Slifer

== Notes ==
Preceded by Gerry Conway	Thor writer 1975	Succeeded by Len Wein
Preceded by Roger Slifer and Len Wein	Iron Man writer 1976	Succeeded by Archie Goodwin
Preceded by Gerry Conway	Iron Man writer 1977–1978 (with Gerry Conway in early 1977)	Succeeded by Bob Layton and David Michelinie
Preceded by Steve Gerber	Howard the Duck writer 1979–1981	Succeeded by Steven Grant
Preceded by n/a	Micronauts writer 1979–1984	Succeeded by Peter B. Gillis
Preceded by Steven Grant	The Incredible Hulk writer 1980–1985	Succeeded by John Byrne
Preceded by John Byrne	Alpha Flight writer 1985–1988	Succeeded by James D. Hudnall
