= 2-XL =

1970s - 1990s Educational Toy

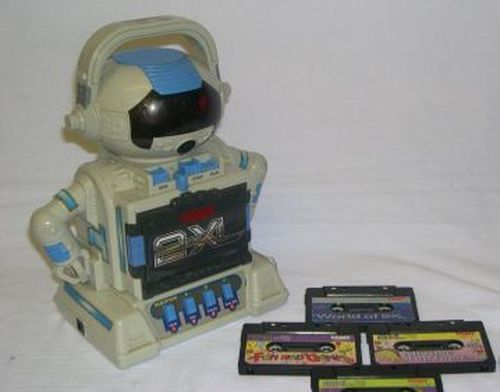
- The 2-XL version with its cassette tapes distributed by Tiger Electronics in 1992. A European version distributed by Tomy is seen here.
- Other names: 2-XL Robot, 2XL Robot, 2XL
- Type: Educational toy robot
- Invented by: Michael J. Freeman
- Company: Mego Corporation (1978–1981); Tiger Electronics (1992–1995)
- Country: United States
- Availability: 1978–1981; 1992–1995

2-XL (2-XL Robot, 2XL Robot, 2-XL Toy) is an educational toy robot that was marketed from 1978–1981 by the Mego Corporation, and from 1992–1995 by Tiger Electronics. 2-XL was the first "smart-toy" in that it exhibited rudimentary intelligence, memory, gameplay, and responsiveness. 2-XL was infused with a "personality" that kept kids focused and challenged as they interacted with the verbal robot. Learning was enhanced via the use of jokes and funny sayings as verbal reinforcements for performance. 2-XL was heralded as an important step in the development of toys, particularly educational ones. 2-XL won many awards, and Playthings, a toy industry magazine, placed 2-XL on its 75th anniversary cover as one of the industry's top-ten toys of all time. The 2-XL name is a pun of the phrase "to excel".

== History and development ==
The toy was invented and licensed for manufacture by Michael J. Freeman, inventor, Ph.D. and was patented. 2-XL exhibited rudimentary intelligence, memory, gameplay, and responsiveness. Dubbed the "Toy with a Personality", 2-XL could respond verbally to the user depending upon which "input or answer" buttons were chosen. 2-XL during its run was one of the most popular toys in terms of market revenue and was dubbed the Talking Robot with a mind of its own. The toy was voiced by Freeman, using a synthesizer to make his voice a high-pitched robot-like sound; it was through this process that Freeman developed 2-XL's personality. 2-XL was first introduced in 1978 by the Mego Corporation, a publicly traded US-based toy company in New York City and it subsequently became a success. The toy was sold in different countries and the tapes were translated into seven foreign languages. Games were also developed for the toy.

Mego, otherwise known for its production of dolls and classic action figures in the 1970s, was seen as an innovator combining toys and education. The toy's name literally meant "To Excel". The toy was voice capable, was able to tell stories, and sing using its special 8-track tapes. The toy's tapes asked multiple-choice questions (MCQs) that were answered by pushing a YES or NO button that changed the tracking of the tape. It was a crude but reportedly innovative use of the technology that was present in that era.

In addition to its general popularity, 2-XL was unprecedented in terms of market revenue. Playthings magazine, in its cover story of September 1978, considered the 2-XL robot as one of the most important toys ever developed, and included it in a class of "toys with impact" along with the Teddy Bear, Barbie Doll, Raggedy Ann, Mickey Mouse among others. The robot was a popular educational toy whose success anticipated the dominant influence of technology in education today. Dubbed the "Toy with a Personality", 2-XL could respond verbally to the user depending upon which "input or answer" buttons were chosen. Part of the reason for this is the connection the toy made between education and fun.

2-XL was interactive playing various tracks from a magnetic audio tape depending on the user's actions. 2-XL's personality was popular and kids loved the back-and-forth banter. For example, if a child got an answer wrong 2-XL might utter something like "Perhaps your brain went on strike! You are Wrong" or, "Nice try but (whispering) you are wrong, but go ahead, I will be a nice little toy robot and give you a second chance now". Other lines from 2-XL included: "Even though you needed two chances you finally got the answer right, elephant is the correct answer"'; "But do not get too excited, you have now earned yourself a more difficult question. Hold on to your hat, here it comes". If the child was right, 2-XL might say: "Although I have the looks you have the brains. You must be a genius. Good work", or, "It is amazing that big brain of yours fits into the head of a child. Nice answer, football is correct".

In 1981, the toy's popularity waned, and it was later discontinued. In 1992, 2-XL was re-introduced by Tiger Electronics, a toy company based in Vernon Hills, Illinois. The toy was changed into a more modern design, and new programmed toy cartridges were also introduced. The voice for this version was done by Freeman as well, and all programs were translated into many different languages.

== Versions ==
=== Mego Corporation version ===
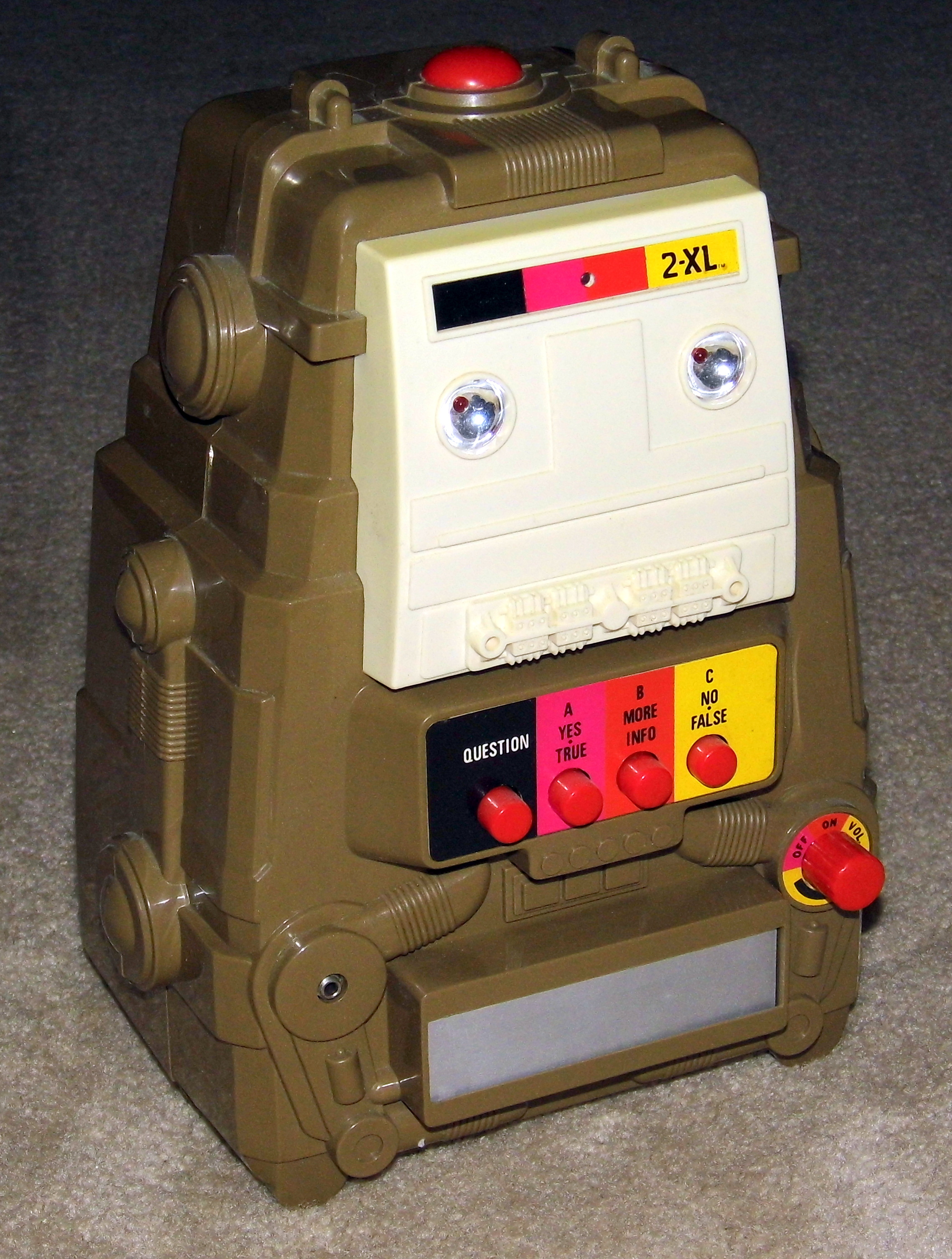
The 2-XL educational toy robot by Mego Corporation in 1978

The original version, created by Mego Corporation, was made of brown plastic with white plastic found on the anterior face of the robot. It had two red light bulbs for the eyes. These bulbs also flashed at moments while 8-track cartridge tape programs played. It had four red buttons on its stomach with designated options for answers to questions asked by the toy, such as "Question", "A or Yes Or True", "B or More Info", and "C or No or False". (Note: Some programs came with overlay cards for the buttons that redefined the choices the user could make for that specific program.) A knob is also found on the lower right portion of the toy which controlled its volume and power. The "mouth" was reused detail molding taken from the Micronauts Battle Cruiser. At the bottom was a large slot for 8-track cartridge tapes: this version was essentially a regular 8-track tape player, but by employing mathematical decision tree programming methods over 20 interactive modes of operation were achieved. The result had enough information and interactive questions to entertain and educate a person for up to two hours. Subjects included sports quiz, Guinness Book of World Records, the metric system, general information and jokes.

Another version of the 2-XL robot

The mold and look received a minor revision in 1980. The eye lights became red and responded to the voice. The flashing lights were also brighter, and the speaker in the back of the unit was changed from a hexagon shape to a more traditional round. The plastic had a glossier appearance. There was a modified version of 2-XL made just for schools with extra earphone jacks, specialty tapes for school curricula, and a teacher's manual to go with each educational tape.

=== Tiger Electronics version ===
A 2-XL X-Men cassette tape.

Tiger Electronics re-introduced 2-XL in 1992. Instead of using 8-track cartridge tapes, this version used cassette tapes that were twice the length of the tapes in the previous version and had a better sound quality. Freeman again recorded the 2-XL voice for the cassette tapes in a professional sound studio. In addition to eyes that would light up, the toy now sported a circle for a mouth that could light up as the machine talked. The toy could now run on batteries and had a headphone jack. Instead of the buttons simply switching tracks on the 8-track tape as in the old version, the cassette version took advantage of the fact that a cassette has a total of four tracks - one for the left and right channel on each side. The tape head in the player could play any of the four parallel tracks, based on which button was pressed. Playing a 2-XL tape in a standard tape player would result in different audio on the left and right channels, and if the reverse side was played, one would hear the other two tracks played in reverse.

Using all four tracks simultaneously in one direction was not unique in toys to the 2-XL since the concept had been borrowed from the Talk 'n Play educational system in existence from 1983-1992 and provided the basis for the interactive give and take on both toys. That concept in turn had been borrowed both from early home-portastudio cassette recorders with the built-in mixing board used by garage bands to put their demos together to try and get hired or get a record deal. The earliest instances were the 4.0 surround sound cassette experiments in the mid '70s to again try to supplant with a cassette counterpart the quadraphonic 8-track (which was just as prone to breaking and jamming as the original 2-XL tapes).

As with the previous version, this version could play any standard type of similar tape, but the user needed to first push the "Question" button (or the "2/A/No" button would work as well, playing the correct (left/dominant) channel of the (forward/A-side) of the program. Pressing buttons labeled 3 or 4 would play the left or right channel of the B-side of the tape in reverse.

Newly released tapes were branded with famous fictional characters and popular film and TV properties, including Spider-Man, X-Men, Star Trek: The Next Generation, Mighty Morphin' Power Rangers, Are You Afraid of the Dark?, Tales from the Cryptkeeper, Jurassic Park, Superman and Batman. These particular 2-XL programs would allow the user to go on an adventure with various characters, deciding their fate by pushing one of the buttons (much like the old Choose Your Own Adventure books).

The second version was on the market from 1992 through 1996, and about 45 tapes were released in total. The toy was sold internationally, including in Japan, Germany, Hungary, Italy, France, UK, Ireland, Canada, Brazil (where it was distributed by Nintendo's official local licenser Playtronic) and others. The tapes were translated into many foreign languages, but were not recorded by Freeman.

== Television series spin-off ==
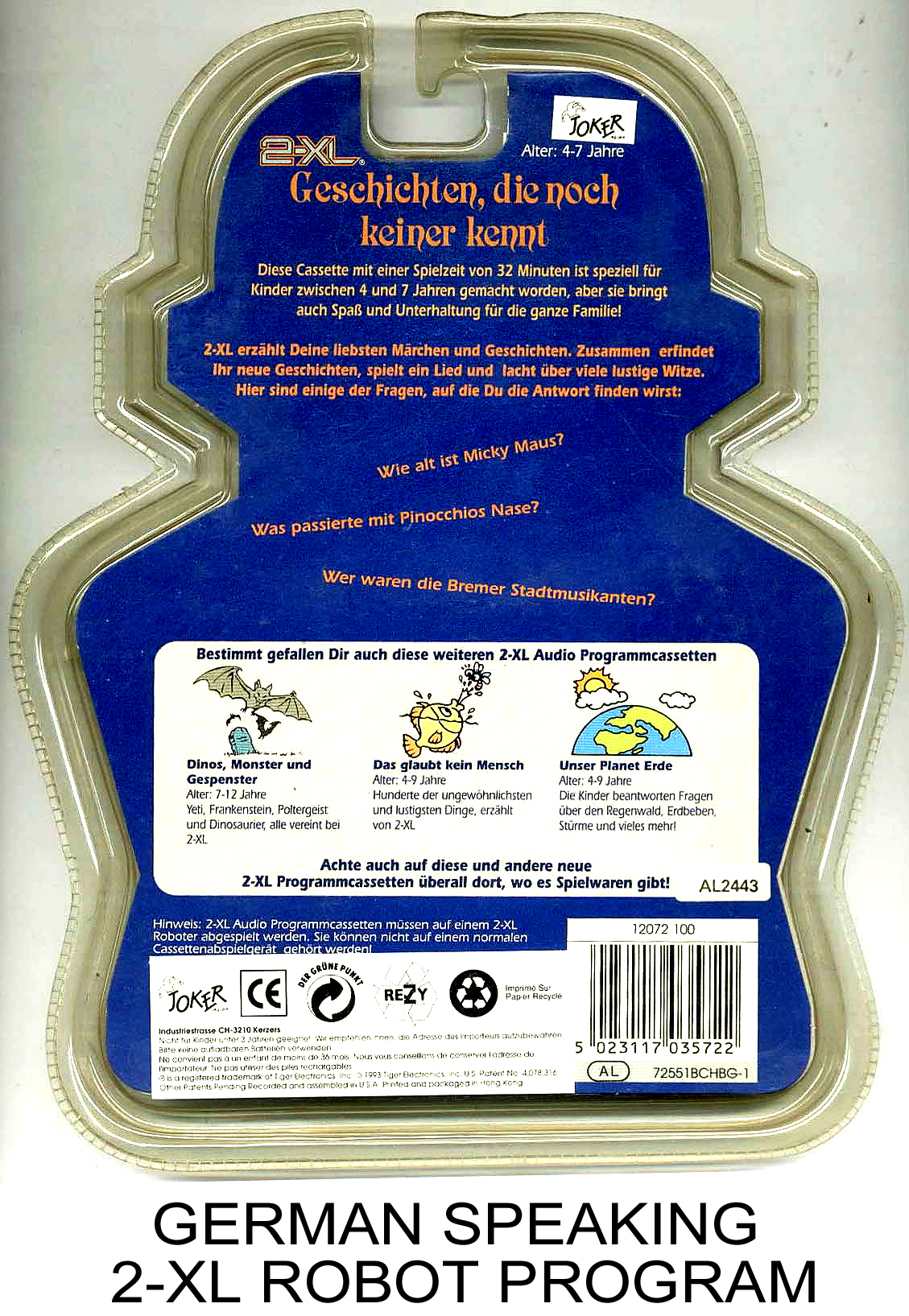
A German Speaking 2-XL Robot Program

The toy's success was also the basis for a game show called Pick Your Brain produced by Marc Summers Productions and Summit Media Group. The 2-XL robot (voiced by Greg Berg) in the show served as the assistant of Marc Summers. 2-XL was also a spokesrobot for basketball player Michael Jordan and his charitable foundation in 1992 and 1993 and appeared in a number of PSA (public service announcements) with Jordan.

== Tapes ==
=== List of 2-XL tapes manufactured by Mego Corporation between 1978 and 1981 ===
General Information was included with each toy robot. The remainder programs were each sold separately:

- 50's and 60's Nostalgia (1978)
- Adult Games and Puzzles (1978)
- Animal World (1978)
- Astronomy: 2-XL in Space (1978)
- The Basics of ABCs (1978)
- Believe This or Not (1978)
- Games and Puzzles Number 1 (1978)
- General Information 2 (1978)
- General Information 3 (1978)
- Guinness Book of World Records (1978)
- Interviews with Great People from History (1978)
- Metric System Education (1978)
- Monsters, Myths and Legends (1978)
- Reading, Writing and Arithmetic (1978)
- Science Fiction (1978)
- Sports (1978)
- Sports 2 (1978)
- Storyland (1978)
- Storyland: 2-XL and the Time Machine (1978)
- US Presidents and American History (1978)
- Exercise with 2-XL (1979)
- Fairy Tale Quiz (1979)
- Math and Number Games (1979)
- Pre-School Facts and Fantasies (1979)
- Science Fiction 2 (1979)
- Strange but Is Is It True (1979)
- Super Heroes and Comic Books Cavalcade (1979)
- Talking Calculator and Number Game (1979)
- Tid Bits and Funny Facts (1979)
- Tri-Lex (1979) - a simulated game-playing AI
- TV and Movie Challenges (1979)
- Who Said It (1979)
- Wonders of the World (1979)
- Robotrivia (1980) - two tape set including a board game.
- Robotstronomy (1980) - two tape set including a board game.
- Word and Sound Games (1980) - two tape set.
- Amazing Sports Feats (1981)
- Amazing World of the Small (1981)
- Bet Your Life (1981)
- Challenges of General Science (1981)
- General Information Revised (1981) - used the same label as the original General Information including the date of 1978.
- Pre-school Bed Time Stories (1981)
- Traffic and Bicycle Safety (1981)

=== List of 2-XL tapes manufactured by Tiger Electronics between 1992 and 1995 ===
The World of 2-XL was sold with each toy robot. The remainder programs were each sold separately. For foreign sales, the Freeman voiced 2-XL English language tapes were translated into foreign languages performed by a professional that spoke the designated language.

- Sportsworld (1992)
- Fun and Games (1992)
- World of Animals (1992)
- World of Science (1992)
- Monsters, Myths, & Dinosaurs (1992)
- Trivia Time (1992)
- Amazing World's Records (1992)
- Fascinating Facts (1992)
- Storymaker (1992)
- African Safari (1993)
- Jurassic Facts (1993)
- Batman: Carnival of Crime (1993)
- Treasure Chest of Facts and Fun (1993)
- Voyage to Outer Space (1993)
- Batman: The Sizzling Scheme (1993)
- Music Maker (1993)
- Oceans of Fun (1993)
- Planet Earth (1993)
- Pet Parade (1993)
- Letter Perfect (1993)
- Count On It (1994) - Scholastic Series
- Food Facts and You (1994)
- Chaos in Jurassic Park (1994)
- Fun With Words (1994) - Scholastic Series
- Incredible Sports Feats (1994)
- Are You Afraid of the Dark? - Nickelodeon (1994)
- Geography & You (1994)
- Power Rangers (1994)
- All-Time Top Topics (1994)
- Careers & You (1994)
- Nature & You (1994)
- Ripley's Believe It Or Not!: The Strange & True! (1994)
- Safety First (1994)
- Say Hello to Famous Folks (1994)
- Spider-Man: For King and Country (1994)
- Stars and Planets Game (1994)
- Star Trek - The Next Generation: Blinded by the Light (1994)
- Superman - The Man of Steel: Mayhem in Metropolis (1994)
- Superman - The Man of Steel: A New Hero In Town (1994)
- Surprise Package (1994)
- X-Men: Deadly Games (1994)
- X-Men: Ghosts That Haunt Us (1994)
- Tales from the Cryptkeeper: If Wishes Were Hornets (1994)

=== Trilex ===
One of the last tapes released for the Mego Corporation version of 2XL was "Trilex", a complete board game designed to be played against 2XL. The tape came with a board which fitted over the front of the 2XL unit itself, with the board in front of the tape slot. The game board consisted of an inverted pyramid shape, 4 squares wide at the top to 1 square at the bottom, with each row colored in a different color (Blue, Yellow, Green, and Tan), and 4 slots through which pieces (which 2XL called "checkers") could be dropped into the pyramid. The slots aligned with 2XL's 4 buttons, with the intention that dropping the checker would also press the appropriate track button on 2XL. The objective of the game was to create either a line or a triangle of three checkers of a selected color. The game and tape design are interesting because they enabled the 4-track tape player to provide a passable simulation of a game-playing AI.

== Merchandising ==
A number of secondary products were licensed under the 2-XL (2XL) name including: laptop computer bags, earphones, lunch boxes and more.

== Awards ==
During its time, both iterations of 2-XL won hundreds of awards, including FamilyFun magazine's award for best toy of 1992, and Right Start Magazine's honor as Europe's best toy in the 3-5 year-old category for 1993. For the 75th anniversary issue of Playthings magazine, 2-XL was featured on the cover and named one of the top ten toys of all time. The Tiger 2-XL was also the winner of the 1992 Walt Disney Company Best Learning Toy for 1992.

== See also ==
- Talk 'n Play, another toy created by Dr. Freeman
