= 2XL =

2XL or 2-XL may refer to:

- 2XL, a large U.S. standard clothing size
- 2XL (TV series), a Polish drama television series
- 2-XL, an educational toy robot
- Double XL, an Indian film
- Laze & Royal, an American hip hop group formerly known as 2XL
- Soul Militia, an Estonian hip hop group formerly known as 2XL, winner of the 2001 Eurovision Song Contest
- XLFM, an Australian radio station formerly known as 2XL
