= Eagle Force (disambiguation) =

Eagle Force is a line of die-cast action figures.

Eagle Force can also refer to:

- The Malaita Eagle Force, militant Solomon Islands organization
- The Eagle's Force, song by William Byrd
- Eagle Force, painting commemorating the RAF's and RCAF's Eagle Squadrons
