= Mego Corporation =

American Toy Company

- Industry: Toy
- Founded: 1954 (original company); 2018 (relaunch)
- Founders: D. David Abrams and Madeline Abrams
- Defunct: 1983 (original company)
- Fate: Fell into bankruptcy, then revived
- Successor: Abrams-Gentile Entertainment
- Headquarters: 41 Madison Avenue, New York City, United States
- Key people: Martin B. Abrams, Neal Kublan, Vincent Baiera
- Products: Dime store toys, action figures, fashion dolls, games, electronic toys
- Brands: Action Jackson (1971–74); Eagle Force (1982–83); Fighting Yank (1973–74); Micronauts (1976–80)
- Website: megofigures.com

Mego Corporation (/ˈmiːɡoʊ/) is an American toy company that in its original iteration was first founded in 1954. Originally known as a purveyor of dime store toys, in 1971 the company shifted direction and became famous for producing licensed action figures (including the long running "World's Greatest Super Heroes" line), celebrity dolls, and the Micronauts toy line. For a time in the 1970s, their line of 8-inch-scale action figures with interchangeable bodies became the industry standard.

In 1982 Mego filed for bankruptcy, and by 1983, the Mego Corporation ceased to exist; today, Mego action figures and playsets can be highly prized collectibles, with some fetching hundreds, or even in some cases, thousands of dollars (depending on rarity) in the collectibles market.

In July 2018, the newly reformed Mego Corporation announced they would be producing a limited run of their classic style clothed dolls in their traditional 1/9 scale, as well as some 1/5 figures sold exclusively through Target. These dolls, which include recreations of action figures released in the 1970s, began seeing release later in the year.

== Corporate history ==
Mego was founded in 1954 by D. David Abrams and Madeline Abrams. The company thrived in the 1950s and early 1960s as an importer of dime store toys until the rising cost of newspaper advertising forced Mego to change its business model. In 1971, the Abrams's son Martin, a recent business school graduate, was named company president.

Under Martin Abrams's direction, the company shifted its production to dolls with interchangeable bodies. Generic bodies could be mass-produced and different dolls created by interposing different heads and costumes on them.

In 1972 Mego secured the licenses to create toys for both National Periodical Publications (DC Comics) and Marvel Comics. The popularity of this line of 8" dolls—dubbed "The World's Greatest Super Heroes"—created the standard action-figure scale for the 1970s.

Mego began to purchase the license rights of motion pictures, television programs, and comic books, eventually producing doll lines for Planet of the Apes, Star Trek, and the Wizard of Oz. Mego also obtained licenses from Edgar Rice Burroughs for his creations, such as Tarzan.

Beginning in 1974 Mego released the Planet of the Apes action-figures, the first such toys sold as film tie-ins. 1975 saw the release of figures from Star Trek, which was steadily gaining fandom in syndication. The Planet of the Apes and Star Trek figures proved popular and inspired the rise of action figure series based on popular culture franchises.

During this period, Mego was known for the lavish parties the company threw at the annual New York American International Toy Fair. In 1975, Mego launched its Wizard of Oz film dolls with a gala with every surviving member of the film's main cast as special guests. Mego's party at the Waldorf-Astoria with Sonny and Cher introducing Sonny & Cher dolls drew a thousand people. Both dolls were formally unveiled on The Mike Douglas Show. The Cher doll was the number-1-selling doll in 1976, helping to make Mego the sixth-ranked American toy manufacturer, based on retail sales.

In 1976, Martin Abrams hashed out a deal with the Japanese toy manufacturer Takara to bring their popular lucite 3" fully articulated Microman action figures to the United States under the name "Micronauts." While Marty was in Japan, Fox's lawyer Mark Peders dropped by the office to show stills from the upcoming motion picture Star Wars, but no one in the office could sign the deal, so Peders visited Kenner Products in the same building and Kenner president Bernie Loomis was in the office and signed the deal. This decision seemed of little consequence to Mego at first, because the Micronauts figures initially sold well, earning the company more than $30 million at their peak. On the other hand, the Star Wars film was extremely popular and competitor Kenner Products sold substantial numbers of Star Wars action figures.

Following Star Wars' huge cultural impact, and Kenner's great success with its action figure line, Mego negotiated licenses for the manufacturing rights to a host of science fiction motion pictures and television shows, including Moonraker, Buck Rogers in the 25th Century, The Black Hole, and Star Trek: The Motion Picture. Although these lines of Mego dolls were of much higher quality than Kenner's 12" Star Wars figures, none were as successful. The widespread success of Kenner's Star Wars 3-3/4" toy line soon made the newer, smaller size the industry standard, shifting sales away from the 8" standard popularized by Mego.

In the late 1970s, Mego was earning about $100 million in sales. Around this time, Mego began shifting their focus toward electronic toys like the 2-XL toy robot and the Fabulous Fred hand-held game player, but sales were not commensurate with the company's investment, and Mego went deeply into debt. Other problems included a rat infestation in Mego's warehouse and a lawsuit from Kenner over illegal appropriation of trade secrets related to the manufacture of their stretch figures. In the fiscal years 1980 and 1981, Mego reported combined losses of $40 million. In fiscal year 1982, the company reported losses of between $18 and $20 million.

In February 1982 the remaining staff was let go and the Mego offices were closed. On June 14, 1982, Mego filed for Chapter 11 bankruptcy; the company officially went under in 1983.

In 1986, Martin Abrams co-founded Abrams-Gentile Entertainment (AGE), in order to retain and manage Mego's licensing contracts, rights and deals. In October 1995 AGE attempted to reclaim the Mego trademark. In March 2002, they abandoned the effort. In early 2009, Martin Abrams announced that AGE had reclaimed the rights to the name Mego.

Mego Corporation is headquartered in Great Neck, with manufacturing facilities in China and Mexico. In July 2018, Mego Corporation premiered an exclusive line with Target stores of their classic 8 inch clothed action figures as well as several 14 inch DC Superheroes figures at San Diego Comic-Con with Joe Namath on hand to autograph his own 14 inch action figure. The Target exclusive featured three waves of figures hitting Target stores in August, October, and November. These figures were limited to 10,000 of each character.

Starting in 2019, Mego has continued to work with Target and other major retailers like Wal-Mart to bring the classic Star Trek, monsters, celebrities, and superheroes back to store shelves and on-line. Mego created action figures from the iconic Star Trek II: The Wrath of Khan movie, giving fans of that 1982 classic the Mego figures they expected to see back then. Mego has also expanded distribution internationally, working with distributors in other countries to bring the magic of Mego to the rest of the world as well.

In 2020 Mego launched new action figures and products with the help of Dr. Mego (Paul Clarke) to a wide audience via Target Corporation stores around the United States.

== Products history ==
=== Fighting Yank ===
A toy similar to GI Joe; so similar, in fact, that Hasbro was able to show that the toy's body had been copied directly from authentic GI Joe tooling. Hasbro threatened a lawsuit and Mego discontinued the product.

=== Broadway Joe Namath ===
An action doll based on New York Jets quarterback Joe Namath. The 1970s toyline included Broadway Joe in New York Jets football uniform, plus additional fashions sold separately.

=== Action Jackson ===
One of Mego's first toys under Martin Adams was an original character, Action Jackson, meant to compete with Hasbro's popular G.I. Joe line. Heavily promoted on television commercials and in newspaper advertisements, the Action Jackson line included dolls, vehicles, and playsets. It was a big seller on its 1971 launch, but soon faded in popularity and was discontinued after 1974. The body design was reused for 8-inch licensed dolls.

=== Dinah Mite ===
A fashion doll produced as a female counterpart to Action Jackson. The doll was not a success, but the body design was reused for 8-inch licensed female dolls.

=== World's Greatest Super Heroes! ===
Beginning in 1972, Mego released the first comprehensive line of DC Comics and Marvel Comics superhero and villain dolls, coining the term "World's Greatest Super Heroes!" (WGSH) as an umbrella title for all the dolls released in this line. To start the line, Mego produced Batman, Robin, Aquaman, and Superman dolls. (For the South African market, a local radio play hero, Jet Jungle, was included in the series.) The earliest dolls were released in a solid box, but these boxes were often damaged by shoppers who wanted to see the figure inside. The design was quickly changed to a "window" style box. The WGSH line was offered from 1972 until 1983.

=== Fashion dolls ===
Mego marketed various fashion doll lines designed to compete with Mattel's popular Barbie line. The company's first attempt was the 1973 "Maddie Mod" line, which included an extensive wardrobe and Maddie's boyfriend "Richie," was not a success. Next, Mego created "Dinah-Mite," a poseable eight-inch (203 mm) scale Barbie-like doll with a boyfriend named Don. Other fashion dolls included "Beautiful Lainie," a 19" doll that danced back and forth from the hips; and Candi, a line that included "Coppertone Candi," a "tanning" doll co-branded with Coppertone sunscreen.

=== TV and movie dolls ===
The popularity of the 1974 releases of the Planet of the Apes and Star Trek: The Original Series lines led Mego to produce a variety of licensed figures based on films and TV shows, including The Flintstones, Happy Days, Laverne & Shirley, Our Gang, Starsky & Hutch, The Waltons, and Wizard of Oz.

Mego introduced a Lynda Carter Wonder Woman doll line in 1977. The first edition of the Wonder Woman dolls and accessories included:

- Wonder Woman (factory-painted bustier top with cloth star-spangled bottoms, bracelets, golden lasso, tiara, and red boots), as well as a Diana Prince Navy Yeoman outfit, featuring black glasses and black high-heeled shoes
- Nubia, Wonder Woman's super-foe
- Queen Hippolyta, Wonder Woman's mother
- Major Steve Trevor, Wonder Woman's best friend and boss

Mego added 12 1/2-inch dolls from the Superman movie in 1978, which included Superman, Jor-El, Lex Luthor, and General Zod.

In the early 1980s Mego produced dolls and vehicles for the popular TV shows CHiPs, Dallas, Dukes of Hazzard, and The Greatest American Hero. The Dukes of Hazzard dolls sold well, but Mego failed with its CHiPs and Dallas dolls.

=== Comic Action Heroes! ===
Always thinking of ways to reduce costs of production, in 1975 Mego released a smaller plastic line of action toys called Comic Action Heroes! that had the costumes molded onto the figure (and later adopted by Kenner Star Wars and Super Powers lines), thus eliminating the extra cost of creating the suits. The line featured Batman, Robin, The Joker, and The Penguin, as well as other DC Comics characters, and Marvel characters such as Spider-Man, Captain America, and the Hulk. Later, in 1979, Mego re-released the line under the new name Pocket Super Heroes.

=== Celebrity dolls ===
In 1976, Mego launched a highly successful 12 1/2-inch celebrity doll line. The first dolls were Sonny and Cher, with famed fashion designer Bob Mackie designing an extensive wardrobe for Cher. Farrah Fawcett, Jaclyn Smith, Diana Ross, Suzanne Somers, Captain and Tennille, and Kiss celebrity dolls followed in 1977 and 1978.

=== Micronauts ===
From 1976 to 1980 Mego produced a licensed line of Takara's Microman figures under the name Micronauts. The 3-3/4" toy line's popularity led Marvel Comics to launch a Micronauts comic book in 1979, which ran until 1986.

=== 2-XL robot ===
In 1978, Martin Abrams purchased inventor Michael J. Freeman's toy robot, the 2-XL, which was introduced to the public and became a success. The toy was sold in different countries and was voiced in seven languages, including English. 2-XL was a revolutionary idea, combining toys and education. A lot of games were also developed for the toy. By 1981, the 2-XL's popularity had waned, and it was later discontinued. However, the 2-XL robot was upgraded and reintroduced in the early 1990s by Tiger Electronics, a US based toy company. The programs for this version were also voiced by Freeman and sold worldwide.

The 2-XL was part of Mego's electronic games line, which included the handheld devices Mini-Vid and Fabulous Fred.

=== Military dolls ===
In 1976, Mego began producing a small collection of World War II-themed military dolls marketed in France, Italy (under the Polistil name), Germany, Australia, and the United Kingdom under different names. Most of these products were branded under the "Lion Rock" name, Mego's manufacturing arm. These dolls were released in United States the early 1980s as "Johnny Action" or "Combat Man." Using the 6-inch (150 mm) format, they were produced after the 12-inch (300 mm) G.I. Joe dolls had lost their popularity and before the revival of the G.I. Joe line in 3 3/4-inch format; they were also intended to compete with Spain's Madelman line of soldier dolls. The 6-inch (150 mm) combat line was not a success.

=== Eagle Force ===
One of Mego's final large product lines was Eagle Force, a 2 3/4-inch-high (70 mm) die-cast action figure toy line co-designed by Paul Kirchner and marketed in 1981–1982. Produced during Ronald Reagan's first term as president, the Eagle Force toy line was marketed as a counter-terrorist task force, to send the message that the United States wasn't going to be "pushed around" anymore. The line was similar to Hasbro's G.I. Joe: A Real American Hero dolls.

=== Reissued Marx playsets ===
Mego acquired the moulds of World War II soldiers, vehicles and landscape terrain from Louis Marx and Company, reissuing their Battleground (1980) and Navarone (1981) playsets. Mego also reissued a Prehistoric Dinosaur, Fort Apache and Galaxy Command playsets.

== Products manufactured ==
=== Action figures ===
- Action Jackson (1971–1974)
- CB McHaul line (1977) (Note: figures and vehicles designed to cash in on the short-lived citizens band radio craze: Comic Action Heroes (1976–1978) – 3-3/4" action figures of DC Comics characters.)
- Eagle Force line (1982) (Note: included playset and vehicles)
- Elastic Superheroes line (1979–1980) (Note: stretchable dolls designed to compete with the popular Kenner product Stretch Armstrong; includes Mego Elastic Donald Duck, Mego Elastic Batman, Mego Elastic Incredible Hulk, and Mego Elastic Plastic Man)
- Fighting Yank (1973–1974) (Note: discontinued by Mego after being sued by Hasbro as being too similar to G.I. Joe: Johnny Action/Combat Man (c. 1981–1982))
- Legends (1975) (Note: historical characters from the American West, Robin Hood, "Super Pirates," "Super Knights," and a medieval playset.)
- Micronauts (1976–1980)
- One Million B.C. (1976–1977) (Note: included "Cave People" and dinosaurs.)
- Pocket Super Heroes (1980–1982) (Note: line of 3-3/4" DC Comics and Marvel Comics figures, vehicles, and playsets.)
- Tarzan (1975) (Note: 3" "Bendy" figure made of poseable, malleable plastic.)
- World's Greatest Super Heroes! (1972–1983)
  - DC Comics characters (Note: Aquaman, Batgirl, Batman, Catwoman, Green Arrow, Isis, Joker, Mr. Mxyzptlk, Penguin, Riddler, Robin, Captain Marvel (for legal reasons labeled as "Shazam"), Supergirl, Superman, Tarzan, Teen Titans (Speedy, Kid Flash, Aqualad, and Wonder Girl), and Wonder Woman, as well as a Batmobile that could seat two 8-inch dolls.)
  - Marvel Comics characters (Note: Captain America, Conan, Falcon, Green Goblin, Hulk, Human Torch, Invisible Girl, Iron Man, Lizard, Mr. Fantastic, Spider-Man, The Thing and Thor.)
  - American West series (1974) (Note: included Sitting Bull, Davy Crockett, Wyatt Earp, Wild Bill Hickok and his horse Shadow, Cochise, Buffalo Bill, and a Dodge City playset.)
  - Mad Monster Series (1974–1975) (Note: included Frankenstein, Dracula, the Wolfman, and the Mummy.)
  - Secret Identity line (1974) (Note: exclusive to Montgomery Ward; included Bruce Wayne, Dick Grayson, Clark Kent, and Peter Parker.)

=== TV/movie dolls ===
- The Black Hole (fall 1979) – 12" and 4" lines
- Buck Rogers in the 25th Century (1979–1981) (Note: 12" line and a series of 3.75" figures and scaled spaceships.)
- CHiPs (1981–1982) (Note: 3-3/4" figures.)
- Dallas (1981)
- Doctor Who (1977–1978) (Note: released only in the United Kingdom in partnership with Denys Fisher; 9" dolls including the Fourth Doctor, Leela, K-9 (released in 1978 after the first six), the Giant Robot, a Cyberman, a Dalek, and a TARDIS.)
- Dukes of Hazzard (1981–1982)
- Flash Gordon (1978)
- The Flintstones (1977)
- Greatest American Hero (1982)
- Happy Days (1977–1978) (Note: included Fonzie, Richie Cunningham, Potsie, Ralph Malph, Fonzie's Garage playset and Fonzie's Motorcycle.)
- King Kong (1977)
- Laverne & Shirley (1978) (Note: included Laverne, Shirley, Lenny, and Squiggy.)
- Lynda Carter Wonder Woman (Note: doll line (1977–1979) – included Wonder Woman, Nubia, Queen Hippolyta, and Major Steve Trevor.)
- Moonraker (1979)
- Our Gang (1976–1977)
- Planet of the Apes (1974–1977)
- Star Trek: The Original Series (1974–1976) (Note: 8" line included Captain Kirk, Mr. Spock, Dr. Leonard McCoy "Bones", Mr. Scott "Scottie", Lt. Uhura, the 9 Star Trek Aliens (a Klingon, a Neptunian, the Keeper, a Gorn, a Cheron, a Romulan, a Talos, an Andorian, and a Mugato), and playsets of the U.S.S. Enterprise, Star Trek: Mission To Gamma VI, as well as a standalone Star Trek Transporter.)
- Star Trek: The Motion Picture (1979) (Note: 3-3/4" line and 12" line.)
- Star Trek Super Phaser II Target Game
- Starsky & Hutch (1976–1978)
- Superman (Note: doll line (1978) – included Superman, Jor-El, Lex Luthor, and General Zod.)
- The Waltons (1974–1976)
- Wizard of Oz (1975)

=== Celebrity dolls ===
- Captain and Tennille (1977)
- Diana Ross (1977)
- Farrah Fawcett (1977–1978)
- Jaclyn Smith (c. 1977)
- Kiss (1978)
- Kristy McNichol (1978)
- Muhammad Ali (1976–1977)
- Sonny and Cher (1976–1978)
- Suzanne Somers (c. 1977)

=== Fashion dolls ===
- Candi (1979)
- Dinah-Mite (1973–1975)
- Lainie (1973) —19" doll
- Maddie Mod (1973)

=== Electronic games and toys ===
- 2-XL (1978–1982) (Note: toy robot)
- Batman Command Console (1977)
- Fabulous Fred (1980) (Note: handheld device with 10 games.)
- Time Out (1980) (Note: A short-lived rebrand of Nintendo's early Game & Watch titles, such as Ball (retitled as Toss-Up), Vermin (Exterminator), and Fire (Fireman Fireman), that was discontinued when the then-recently established Nintendo of America began releasing the games under their original titles the same year.)
- Mini-Vid (1979) (Note: handheld electronic games like Break Free, Dodge City Gunfight, Sea Battle, and Spacewar.)
- Pulsonic baseball (1980)
- Star Trek tricorder (1976) – life-size

=== Games ===
- Ball Buster (1975)
- Magnadoodle (1978)
- Mazeroni (1975)
- Obsession (1978–1979)
- See 'N Drive (1978)
- Sixth Sense (1978–1979)

=== Other ===
- Beanie Buddies (1978)
- Bubble Yum Baby (1977) (Note: doll that blew a chewing gum bubble; co-branded with Bubble Yum.)
- Chills 'N Thrills stunt car game (1975)
- Clown Around (1981)
- Commander Zack Power and his Lightning Cycle (1975)
- Dare Bros. (Note: toy glider (1975))
- Doodlebugs (1978–1979) (Note: wooden toy cars)
- Dune Machine (1980) (Note: toy dune buggy)
- Evel Knievel (Note: bike accessories (1975))
- Luv'n'Stuff (1975) (Note: soft animal characters.)
- Magnanimals (1978) (Note: wooden toy animals, vehicles, and playsets, including some Disney characters.)
- Poz 'N Play (1978)
- Puppet Love (1978)
- Speed Burners (1976/1977/1978) (Note: diecast cars designed to compete with Matchbox and Hot Wheels.)
- Woodies (1973) (Note: wooden preschool toys.)

== "Mego Melt" ==
Several different (but not all) plastic dolls made by Mego have suffered from "Mego Melt" (also known as "Mego Molt"), a term coined by toy collectors to describe the material deteriorating over time. The plastic used for the doll's torso reacts with the rubberized plastic used for the arms and legs. The result is a melting of the torso at those joining points: shoulder, underarm, hips, and buttocks. Even when stored carefully, this melting often results in the costumes becoming stuck to the dolls. Excessive heat from storage in hot attics or garages exacerbates this problem. The dolls' hair and eyelashes are prone to similar deterioration when exposed to high temperatures.

== In popular culture ==
From 1996 to 2011, Mego's 8-inch (200 mm) dolls, particularly the superhero line, found new life in Twisted ToyFare Theater (originally called "Twisted Mego Theatre"), a humorous photo comic strip appearing in ToyFare, a monthly magazine published by Wizard Entertainment. ToyFare staff posed and took photos depicting the dolls in bizarre situations, with added dialogue balloons. The series was well known in comic book and collectors' circles for its distinctive, off-the-wall sense of humor. The popular strips were later published separately in their own collections.

Mego dolls as well as similarly styled figures are used in sexually perverted adult oriented situations in the Cartoon Network/Adult Swim program Robot Chicken. The show, which debuted in February 2005, is directly based on Twisted ToyFare Theater and features three of its writers.

== See also ==
- Hasbro
- Kenner Products
- Mattel
- Trendmasters
