= Kiss action figures =

Merchandise of the band Kiss

- Type: Action figures
- Company: Mego (1978–82); McFarlane (1997–2005); Figures Toy (2012)
- Country: United States
- Availability: 1978–2012
- Materials: Plastic
- Features: Kiss (band)

Action figures have been an important and integral staple of the vast merchandising empire created around popular American rock band, Kiss. Kiss merchandising currently includes more than 2,000 product categories, and the limited availability of many products means that is a popular area of interest with collectors.

== Mego ==
The first run of Kiss action figures were produced by the Mego Corporation in 1978, with two variant editions. The first series was produced with Mego’s stock standard "skinny" bodies, while the second edition was released with muscular, more superhero-like, physiques. Paul Stanley's head was recycled from Mego's doll of the Captain from Captain and Tennille and was repainted along with rooted hair. Each figure was package separately and each came with a cardboard cutout of their respective instrument.

== McFarlane ==
In 1997, Kiss signed a marketing deal with McFarlane Toys. The deal included the creation of the 31 issue Kiss: Psycho Circus comic book series, along with, Kiss action figures based on the characters appearing in the comic series.

=== Kiss (Series 1, June 1997) ===
- Paul Stanley
- Gene Simmons
- Ace Frehley
- Peter Criss

In the first series of action figures, each of the band members’ instruments doubles as weaponry, mirroring the Kiss: Psycho Circus comic series. Three different versions were released with variant packagings.

=== Kiss (Series 2, June 1998): Psycho Circus ===
- The Celestial, with Stiltman
- The Demon, with Ring Master
- King of Beasts, with Animal Wrangler
- The Starbearer, with The Jester

In 1998, the second series of McFarlane figurines was released based again on the Psycho Circus characters, with revised sculpts to add onto the ‘super hero’ persona of each character. Each figurine also came packaged with a circus-themed figure and weapons. There were three variant editions of the “King of Beasts” cape, first a short cape, then a full-length cape and finally a fur styled cape.

=== Kiss (Series 3, January 1999): Tour Edition ===
- Paul Stanley
- Gene Simmons
- Ace Frehley
- Peter Criss

In January 1999, series three was released dubbed as the Tour Edition figurines. These figurines were modeled from ‘true-to-life’ sculpts of each the current band members at the time, as they had generally appeared on stage during the Psycho Circus world tour. each figurine came with their own respective instruments. Two variants were made to the guitars featured with the Ace Frehley and Paul Stanley figurines. The first edition had both Frehley and Stanley with model Gibson Les Paul's and the second with Flying V shaped guitars.

=== Kiss Special Edition (January 1999) ===
The Demon (Gene Simmons)

A six inch Gene Simmons special edition figurine housed in a display case was released separately from the Psycho Circus series. Spencer’s Gifts exclusive release.

=== Kiss (Series 4, September 2000): Alive! ===
- Paul Stanley
- Gene Simmons
- Ace Frehley
- Peter Criss

Series four was released in September 2000, and each figurine was modeled from the bands Alive! era stage costumes circa 1976 and stood at seven inches. The figurines were sold in both separate packaging and in a boxed set. The figurines were each packaged with their respective instruments, guitar amplifiers and additional stage props. In addition, the boxed set featured battery powered stage lights, while the individual sets came with a black guitar pick.

There is an error package of The Demon (Gene Simmons) figure. The Demon figure is inside the packaging, but the cardboard backing is of Peter Criss.

=== Kiss Special Edition (October 2001) ===
- The Demon (Gene Simmons)

A twelve inch Gene Simmons figurine was also released separately from the Alive! series.

=== Kiss Collectable Statues (March 2002) ===
- Paul Stanley
- Gene Simmons
- Ace Frehley
- Peter Criss

A six-inch mini-bust of each member was released in March 2002.

=== Kiss (Series 5, July 2002): Creatures ===
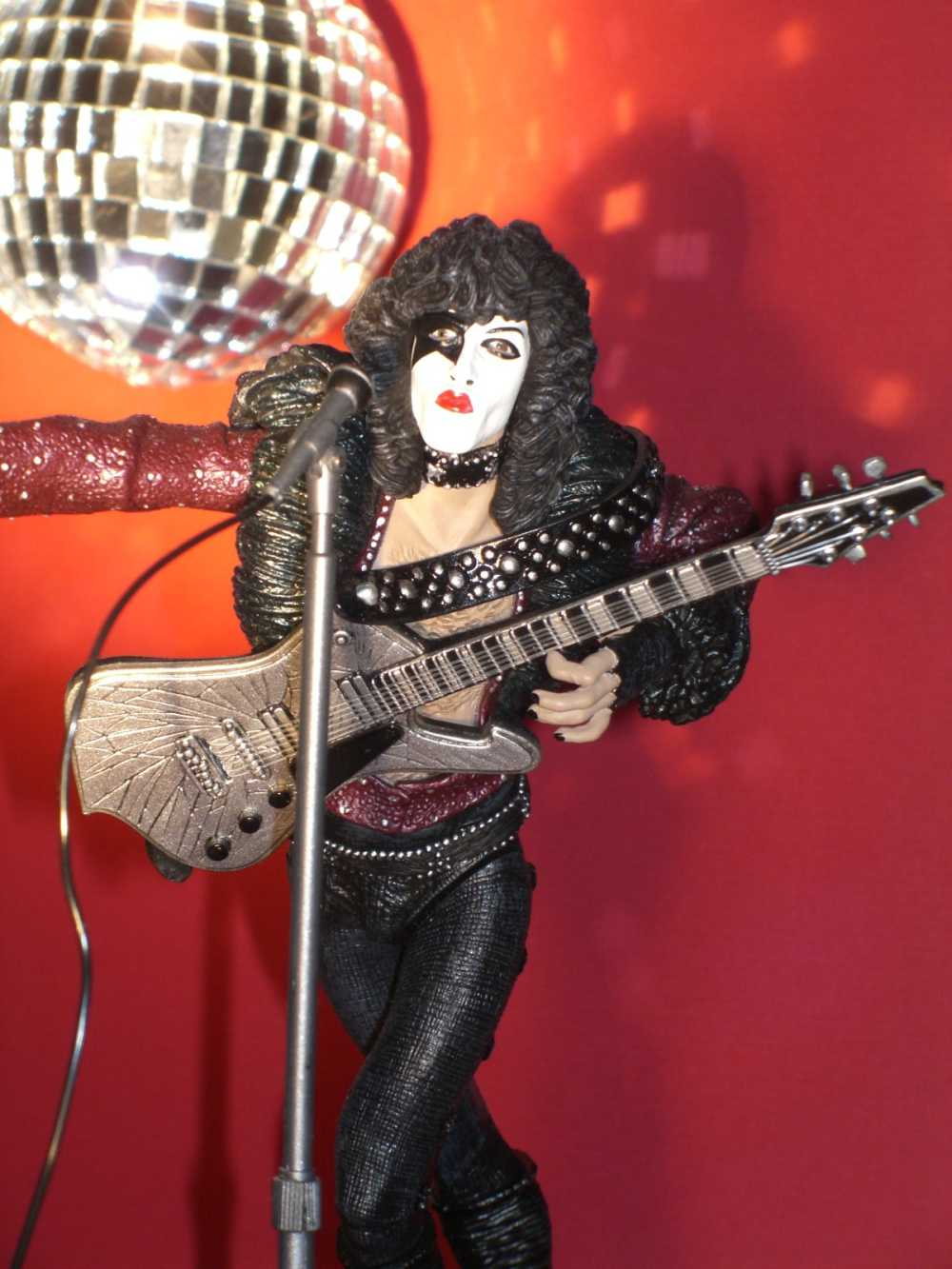
Paul Stanley "series 5" action figure, released in 2002

- Paul Stanley
- Gene Simmons
- Ace Frehley
- Eric Carr

Series 5 was released in 2002, called Kiss "Creatures". The figurines were based upon the "Unmasked" tour costumes and for the first time featured Eric Carr as the Fox. The figurines were also poseable, allowing them to be manipulated into a large variety of positions. The figurines were sold separately, or in a deluxe boxed set which featured a drum kit and battery powered stage lights. Two different variants of the Gene Simmons figurine was released, the first with blood dripping from the mouth and the second without. (Note: To date, there is no existing figure of Vinnie Vincent.)

=== Kiss Special Edition (August 2002) ===
- The Demon (Gene Simmons)

A twelve-inch Gene Simmons figurine was also released separately from the "Creatures" series, also with the two variants.

=== Kiss Special Edition (March 2004) ===
- The Demon (Gene Simmons)

In March 2004, a twelve-inch Gene Simmons figurine based upon the Destroyer was released in a special edition display case.

=== Love Gun Deluxe Boxed Set (August 2004) ===
- Seven figurines

In August 2004, a seven-figure set based on Ken Kelly's cover painting of the band's Love Gun album was released. It includes figurines of the four band members as appears on the album cover. The set also includes three scantily clad female groupies. The figurines were sold together in a deluxe boxed set.

=== Music 3-Packs (October 2005) ===
- Gene Simmons, The Demon
- Paul Stanley, The Starchild

In October 2005, boxed-set three packs were released, each containing three different previously released versions of either Gene Simmons or Paul Stanley. The figurines displayed the evolution of the founding members costumes, as well as, McFarlane Toys renditions of them.

== Figures Toy Company ==
In early 2012 it was announced that Figures Toy Company would be releasing a series of Kiss action figures, with the first series being close replicas of the 1978 Mego Love Gun figurines. The figurines have routed hair, cloth clothing, sixteen points of articulation, and will be available as eight inch figures as well as twelve inch. After the first series, Sonic Boom, Dressed to Kill and the debut Kiss album figurines have been planned.

=== Love Gun Retro Action Figures (2012) ===
- Paul Stanley
- Gene Simmons
- Ace Frehley
- Peter Criss

Each eight inch figure comes with a replica Love Gun album cover, while each twelve inch figure comes with one of four ‘retro’ miniature Kiss T-shirts.

== Toy Figurines ==
There have also been over the years, countless Kiss licensed and un-licensed toy figurines. This includes products such as, rubber ducks, toy robots, bobble heads, pose able figurines, lego styled children's play-sets, Be@rBricks and KuBricks, Mr. Potato Head, plush toys, and statuettes.
