= Talk 'n Play =

Interactive desktop educational toy book reader

- Type: Interactive read along
- Invented by: Michael Freeman
- Company: Child Guidance (1984-1985); Hasbro (1986-1991); Playskool (1992)
- Country: United States
- Availability: 1985–1992
- Slogan: The Interactive Tape Playing and Recording System That Grows With Your Child

Talk 'n Play was an American interactive desktop educational toy book reader with a built in microphone and action buttons that was sold from 1983 to 1992 as an entertaining and educational toy manufactured by Hasbro. It appears to work utilizing the two sets of right/left tracks to have the "interactive" mono audio segments. It also provided a record capability so as a child could add in their own voice and create interactions with characters on the program. It was invented and Patented by Michael J. Freeman Ph.D. and licensed for use by the Children's Television Workshop (owners of Sesame Street) and the Walt Disney Company, among others (see list below). It is similar to adapted 4 channels of educational information (and recordings from the child) to produce interactivity, but the main voices were created and produced by Sesame Street and Disney characters under license. Because the toy contained an integrative book reader, some considered it an early lower tech version of the Amazon Kindle. Story programs were produced by others. Talk 'n Play had many music programs where children could add in or take out, different instruments as the song is played.

Talk 'n Play was considered 'way ahead of its time' because it was the first of this genre of educational toys that allowed children to directly interact with famous characters, via Freeman's system. Talk 'N Play also won five awards for excellence in product design.

== History ==
First manufactured by CBS Toys under the brand name Child Guidance in 1984 as Electronic Talk 'n Play, it was later produced by Hasbro under the brand name Playskool in 1986 as Talk 'n Play. A smaller "portable" unit was also released under the Playskool brand name. Other non related items have been released from Hasbro bearing the mark Talk 'n Play.

== Book/cassette tape sets ==
- An Adventure With Mother Goose
- Animals and Their Babies
- The Reading Robot: A First Reading Program
- Can You Tell Me How to Get to Sesame Street? (included with new Talk 'n Play units)
- Lovable, Furry Old Grover in Please Don't Push the Red Button
- A Silly Sesame Street Story: The Three Little Pigs
- Big Bird's Alphabet Book
- Let's Play School
- Bert and Ernie's Band
- The Muppets: Opening Day at Peppermint Park
- The Muppets: The Great Treasure Hunt
- Fraggle Rock: The Great Fraggle Travel Race
- In Search of the Planet Cobalt
- Animal Rock Band
- Mickey Mouse: Circle M for Math
- The Computer Apprentice
- Cookie Monster: Cookies for Sale
- The Haunted House Mystery
- It's a Hello Kitty World
- Alvin and The Chipmunks in Concert
- The Amazing Facts Game Show
- Goofy's Sports Coaching Tips
- The Monster Lover's Club
- Jokes, Riddles, Gags and Giggles
- Terry the Triceratops
- Puzzles and Games
- Blast Off!
- Inspector Gadget and the Weather Station Caper
- Mickey's Treasure Hunt
- Beauty Finds The Beast
