= Plan B Toys =

American toy company

- Industry: Toys
- Founded: 1999; 26 years ago
- Founders: Jay Borman; Chris Borman; Tony Simione
- Headquarters: Groveport, Ohio, U.S.
- Website: www.planbtoys.com

Plan B Toys Ltd. is a Groveport, Ohio–based toy company, founded in 1999 by Jay Borman, Chris Borman, and Tony Simione, former employees of ReSaurus Company, who founded it with the intention of freely creating new ideas and properties without corporate boundaries.

Plan B Toys has operated for the past few years as a development house. During that time, Plan-B has developed product for a variety of toy manufacturers, including ReSaurus, Palisades Toys, WizKids, Diamond Comics, Parent Banc, and Cartoon Books. Plan B has been involved with the development of product for many successful licenses including Muppets, Street Fighter, Resident Evil, Mage Knight, Crash Bandicoot, Call of Duty, Sonic the Hedgehog, Star Wars and many others. In 2006, Plan B planned to release additional licensed products. Products are in development for Jim Henson's The Dark Crystal and Labyrinth films. They are also developing new World War II figures. New paratroopers and other figures will be available in a new deluxe format.

== Nazi controversy ==
In October 2004, a Plan B Toys action figure depicting a Totenkopf Panzer division officer, licensed from the video game Call of Duty, came under fire. A Canadian customer complained that the figure glorified the Nazi party and demanded that the figure be removed from store shelves. A representative for Plan B explained that the figure was intended to be a faithful reproduction of a historical figure and a video game character, and was in no way intended to support any political idea or ideology. Regardless, the company agreed to recall the figures.
