= The Bus (book) =

Book by Paul Kirchner

The Bus is a 1987 collection of Paul Kirchner's comic strip The Bus that ran in Heavy Metal magazine. Each strip depicts a man hitching a ride on a bus in increasingly bizarre ways. Dave Langford reviewed The Bus for White Dwarf #94, and stated that "these explorations of the Bus in American society are mostly original and weird. They are highly sophisticated humour; consult the book for the page on which this is contrasted with unsophisticated humour."

== Reviews ==
- Review by Andy Sawyer (1987) in Paperback Inferno, #68
