= Paul Kirchner =

American writer and illustrator (born 1952)

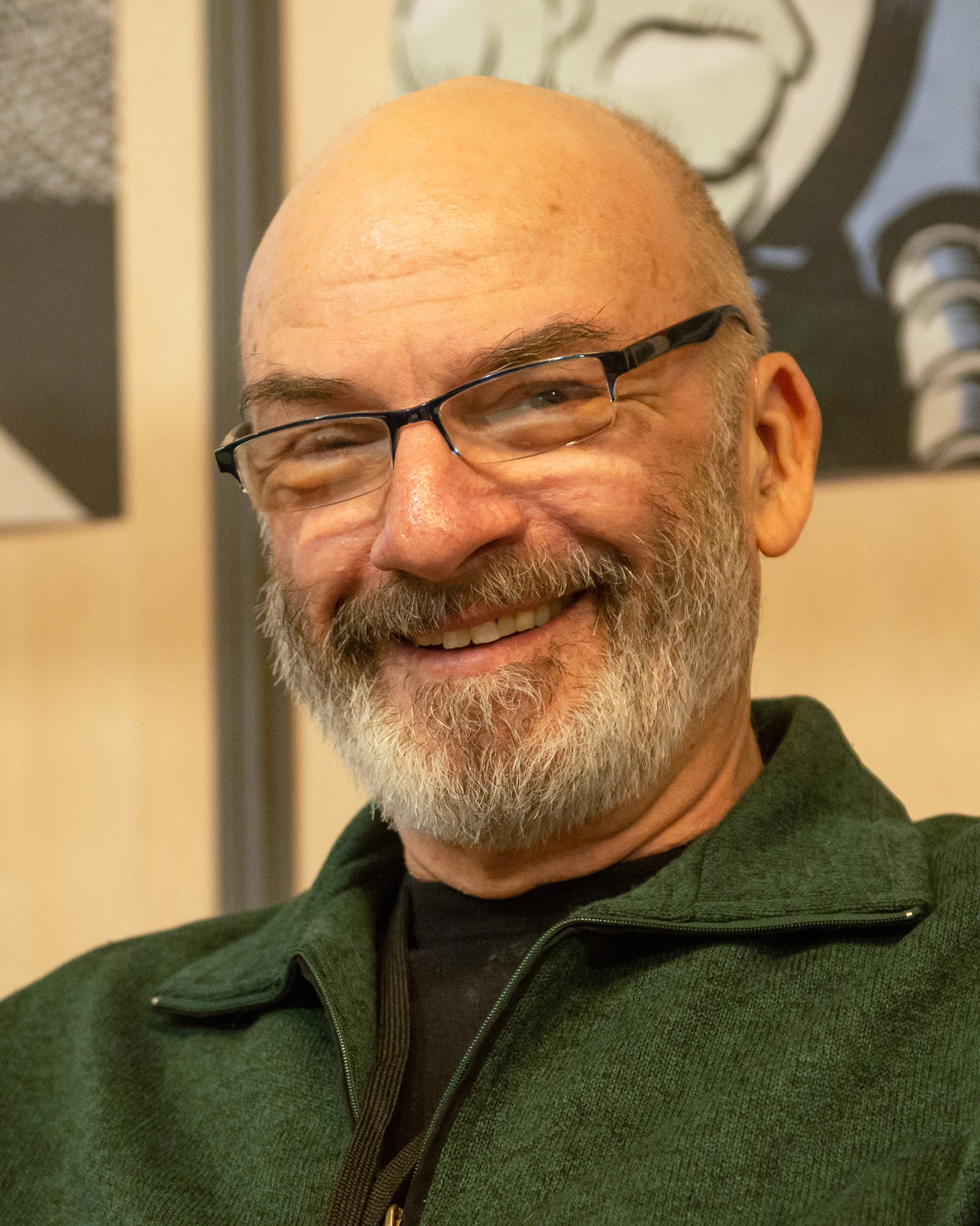
- Paul Kirchner at Angoulême International Comics Festival 2023
- Born: January 29, 1952 (age 74) New Haven, Connecticut, U.S.
- Areas: Cartoonist, Artist

Paul Kirchner (born January 29, 1952) is an American writer and illustrator who has worked in diverse areas, from comic strips and toy design to advertising and editorial art.

== Early life ==
Kirchner was born in New Haven, Connecticut. He attended Cooper Union School of Art but left in his third year, when, with the help of Larry Hama and Neal Adams, he began to get work in the comic book industry.

== Career ==
=== Comics ===
Paul Kirchner's Shaman, from Heavy Metal

He penciled stories for DC's horror line and assisted on Little Orphan Annie for Tex Blaisdell, who took over the strip after the death of Harold Gray.

In December 1973, Ralph Reese introduced Kirchner to Wally Wood, for whom he worked as assistant for several years.

In the mid-1970s, Kirchner wrote and illustrated the surrealistic comic strip Dope Rider for High Times.

For Heavy Metal he did an equally surrealistic monthly strip, the bus (1979–85). These strips were collected in a book, The Bus, published by Ballantine in 1987. A new edition has been released in 2012 by French publisher Tanibis. Paul Kirchner also wrote and illustrated occasional short features for Heavy Metal and Epic Illustrated. Most of them were collected in the book Realms (Catalan Communications, 1987).

In 1981, through his brother Thomas Kirchner, a Zen Buddhist monk, Paul Kirchner met the Zen practitioner and author Janwillem van de Wetering. Together they produced a graphic detective novel, Murder by Remote Control (Ballantine, 1986).

In 1983–84, Kirchner did the licensing art and in-pack comic books for the Robo Force robot toy line from CBS Toys. From the mid-1980s to the mid-1990s, he wrote and drew comics features for He-Man, GoBots, ThunderCats, G.I. Joe and Power Rangers magazines, published by Telepictures (later Welsh Publications).

He illustrated a surreal cartoon for VQ Magazine and the long-running Jack B. Quick feature in Sports Illustrated for Kids.

Paul Kirchner stopped doing comics from the mid-90s to early 2010s. Between 2013 and 2015 he drew new episodes of the bus which have been published in various magazines in US and in Europe. He also relaunched Dope Rider for High Times. He is currently doing a comic strip, Hieronymus & Bosch, which is featured in the comics section of the Adult Swim website. He drew a four-page autobiographical story for The Boston Globe 2015 Boomers Issue.

=== Illustration ===
In the 1970s and early 1980s, Kirchner did several dozen covers for the pornographic magazine Screw. He regularly did illustrations for The New York Times, The Wall Street Journal, and other publications.

=== Toy design ===
In 1981, he co-designed a line of military action figures, the Eagle Force, for the Mego Corporation.

Kirchner freelanced regularly for Tyco Toys, working on the Dino-Riders, Crash Dummies, and Spy-Tech toy lines, for which he wrote the back stories, did design work, wrote and drew in-pack comics and scripted for animation.

=== Non-fiction books ===
He illustrated Col. Jeff Cooper's To Ride, Shoot Straight and Speak the Truth, as well as seven subsequent books for the noted firearms authority and big game hunter.

Kirchner wrote three pop-culture books for Rhino Entertainment. The first, Forgotten Fads and Fabulous Flops, inspired an episode of The History Channel's Modern Marvels, "Failed Inventions", in which Kirchner is featured.

He has published five books with Paladin Press: The Deadliest Men, Dueling With the Sword and Pistol, Jim Cirillo's Tales of the Stakeout Squad, More of the Deadliest Men Who Ever Lived, and Bowie Knife Fights, Fighters, and Fighting Techniques.

=== Advertising ===
From 1996 to 2002, Kirchner held the post of senior art director at Jordan, McGrath, Case & Taylor (later Arnold New York). Kirchner and his creative partner, writer Andrew Cahill, created a campaign for Zest body wash featuring football's Craig "Ironhead" Heyward.

In 2002, Kirchner returned to freelance illustration, working primarily in advertising.

== Personal life ==
Kirchner lives in Connecticut with his wife, Sandy Rabinowitz, an illustrator specializing in equine art. They have three adult children.

== Bibliography ==
=== Comics ===
- Murder by Remote Control with Janwillem van de Wetering (Ballantine, 1986, Dover, 2016 (reissue ed.))
- Realms (Catalan Communications, 1987)
- The Bus (Ballantine, 1987; Tanibis, 2012 (reissue ed.))
- The Big Book of Losers: Pathetic but True Tales of the World's Most Titanic Failures (DC Comics, 1997)
- The Bus 2 (Tanibis, 2015)
- Awaiting the Collapse: Selected Works 1974 - 2014 (Tanibis, 2017)
- Hieronymus & Bosch (Tanibis, 2018)
- Dope Rider: A Fistful of Delirium (Tanibis, 2021)
- The Bus 3 (Tanibis, 2025)

=== Non-fiction ===
- Forgotten Fads and Fabulous Flops: An Amazing Collection of Goofy Stuff That Seemed Like a Good Idea at the Time (Rhino, 1995)
- Everything You Know is Wrong (Rhino, 1995)
- Oops!: A Stupefying Survey of Goofs, Blunders, and Botches, Great and Small (Rhino, 1996)
- Deadliest Men: The World's Deadliest Combatants Throughout the Ages (Paladin Press, 2001)
- "Trajectories", in Against the Grain: Mad Artist Wallace Wood (TwoMorrows, 2003)
- Dueling With The Sword and Pistol: 400 Years of One-on-One Combat (Paladin Press, 2004)
- Jim Cirillo's Tales of the Stakeout Squad (Paladin Press, 2008)
- More of the Deadliest Men Who Ever Lived (Paladin Press, 2009)
- Bowie Knife Fights, Fighters, and Fighting Techniques (Paladin Press, 2010)
