= Action Jackson (toy) =

Discontinued action figure toy

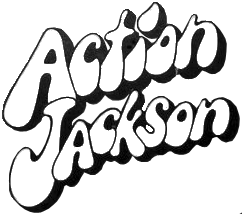
- Product type: Action figure
- Current owner: Mego
- Produced by: Mego
- Country: United States
- Introduced: 1971
- Discontinued: 1974; 52 years ago
- Related brands: G.I. Joe; Captain Action

Action Jackson is a discontinued line of action figures and accessories manufactured by Mego Corporation in the early 1970s. It was Mego's first action figure series, and was an initial success but then lost sales to Hasbro's G.I. Joe line.

It became the template for Mego's popular later lines of 8-inch action figures based on licensed characters from such franchises as DC Comics, Marvel Comics, and Star Trek.

== History ==
Similar in theme to the G.I. Joe line of toys by Hasbro, and the Captain Action toys by the Ideal Toy Company, Action Jackson came in three varieties: two Caucasian models, one with a beard and one without; and one African-American model with no beard. The toys were marketed with a line of accessories, including battery-powered vehicles such as a wire-controlled Jeep, a rescue helicopter, and a snowmobile.

The line is one of Mego's first attempts at producing action figures with interchangeable bodies. Generic bodies could be mass-produced and different figures created by interposing different heads and costumes on them. Constructed primarily in an 8-inch (200 mm) scale, the figures helped set an industry standard in the 1970s.

Heavily promoted on television commercials and in newspaper advertisements, the Action Jackson line was a big seller on its 1971 launch, but by 1974 had faded in popularity.

=== Bibliography ===
- Bonavita, John (2001). Mego Action Figure Toys, 3rd Edition
