= Sonny & Cher dolls =

Celebrity dolls

- Sonny and Cher promoting the dolls on their TV show in 1976.
- Type: Doll
- Company: Mego Corporation & Bob Mackie
- Country: United States
- Availability: 1976–1978
- Materials: Plastic

The Sonny & Cher dolls were a collection of 12-¼ inch high celebrity doll likenesses of pop rock duo Sonny & Cher. The line was released by Mego Corporation in 1976. The release of these fashion dolls coincided with the popularity of The Sonny & Cher Show prime time variety TV show.

== History ==
In May 1976, Mego launched a 12 ¼ inch celebrity doll line to compete directly with Mattel's Barbie doll. The first dolls were Sonny and Cher, with Bob Mackie designing an extensive wardrobe for Cher. Mego held a 1,000 guest dinner dance at the Waldorf-Astoria to launch the dolls.

The Cher doll was the No. 1 selling doll in 1976. After the great success of sales of dolls in 1976, another Cher set was released in 1977, including a new wardrobe with a dress, a new doll and a set of interchangeable clothes. The range was closed in 1978 after the release of other toys for the series.

== The dolls ==
Before becoming available to the general public, a preview of Sonny & Cher dolls was shown in the Mego catalog of the 1976. The dolls had different features from the final versions: Sonny's face was serious, and the arms of Cher were bent at right angles. The final version of the Sonny doll version was given a smile and the arms of Cher were put straight. Both dolls were formally unveiled on The Mike Douglas Show.

Mego produced three versions of the Cher doll. The first, packaged in an orange box, had extra-long hair and wore a coral-colored gown with a flared bottom. The second doll, Growing Hair Cher, came in a hot pink box and featured a "Key" that kids could use to change the length of Cher's hair. This doll wore a black and silver dress and black open-toed shoes. Growing Hair Cher's dress had a number of subtle style variations, and the doll itself was packaged in two different types of boxes. The third Cher, available in 1978, was more cheaply made, with a hollow plastic body without jointed hands. It was sold wearing a one piece swimsuit in yellow, blue or red. This doll was packaged in a narrower red box featuring what is commonly referred to as the Cher gypsy picture.

Following the discontinuation of the Mego line, remaining Mego Celebrity Doll heads (Cher & Farrah) were sold to O.K. Toys of Pawtuckett Rhode Island where they were placed on even cheaper blow-molded bodies. These were packaged in plastic bags, using the old Mego logos and are commonly referred to by collectors as "Baggie Cher & Baggie Farrah."

The Sonny doll (produced only in 1976 and only by MEGO) came with a six-piece wardrobe. Cher came with rooted eyelashes and there were originally thirty-two different costumes designed by Bob Mackie. Mego released outfits in five different formats: Purple Box Designer Collection, Green Box Designer Collection, Boutique Collection (1977), Blue Carded fashions and Wards Exclusive Outfit Gift Sets.

=== Fashions ===
Cher doll outfits were designed either from Mackie originals or by Mackie himself. They recreated some of Cher's iconic outfits from her TV variety shows including "Laverne", "Indian Squaw"(from Half Breed), and "Foxy Lady." Most of the clothes were sold individually along with shoes. Each Cher doll or outfit was supplied with a small fold-out brochure which cataloged the various outfits available. Early editions featured cards with the Mackie sketches which fit into the "closet" mechanism in the dressing room playset. The clothes were sized to fit other Mego Celebrity dolls such as Farrah Fawcett, Lynda Carter as Wonder Woman, and Diana Ross.

Following Mego's discontinuation of the celebrity line, the overage of clothes were sold to smaller companies for re-packaging. Many Cher outfits were re-packaged and sold at Toys R Us under the "Jordache" logo fashion doll line.

== Other Toys ==
In addition to the dolls, Mego produced other toys affiliated with the Sonny & Cher product line. Many of those toys were available in the 1977 catalog. Cher's Dressing Room is a closet, backstage dressing room, and carrying case for outfits. The Cher Travel Trunk was a holding spot for the doll's many outfits. Mego also released Cher's Infilatable Tent Set and Sonny & Cher's Roadster in 1977. The red Roadster is convertible, and the box shows a picture of Sonny and Cher driving it. Sonny & Cher Theatre in the Round (Later sold as Cher's Theatre in the Round) is a revolving stage with four scenes: the main stage, Sonny's Pizzeria, and Cher's dressing room. It also came with a piano, microphone stand, and dressing table. The Cher's Makeup Center was released in competition with The Barbie Makeup Center and came with curlers and face paint. The last items of the catalog were Cher's Sing Along Phono (a portable record player) and Cher's Fashion Jewelry.

== Collectables ==
The dolls are collector's items sought by adults who were children in the 1970s, avid Sonny and Cher fans, as well as general doll and pop culture collectors. Mint condition dolls and outfits (still in their packaging) sell for $30 to $400 (US) each and are often offered for sale on auction sites such as eBay.

Several defects exist in the after market Mego Cher doll line. The hair often becomes ruined from play, "over-brushing" and/or becoming wet. Most often it becomes tangled or matted, or plugs get pulled out at the roots. The rooted eyelashes can become frayed and children sometimes pulled them out. The Cher doll also had long molded fingernails which were prone to breaking or wearing with play.

Virtually every doll has suffered from "Mego Melt", a term coined by toy collectors to describe the plastic used by the Mego Corporation deteriorating over time. This has affected virtually every version of the Long Hair Cher and Growing Hair Cher dolls. The plastic used for the doll's torso reacts with the rubberized plastic used for the arms and legs. The result is a melting of the torso at those joining points (shoulder, underarm, hips, and buttocks). Even when stored carefully, this melting often results in the costumes becoming stuck to the dolls. Excessive heat from storage in hot attics or garages exacerbates this problem. Hair and eyelashes are prone to similar deterioration when exposed to high temperatures. The best advice is to store plastic dolls at a controlled room temperature away from light, heat and high humidity. Moisture encourages mold and light accelerates the natural aging process of plastics which is sometimes referred to as Polymer degradation or plastic decay.
