= Palisades Toys =

American Toy Company

Palisades Entertainment, LLC (Palisades Toys)
- Type: Private
- Founded: August 1994; 32 years ago
- Founder: Michael Horn
- Defunct: February 1, 2006
- Fate: Filled for bankruptcy, taken over by "Limited by CAS Inc."
- Headquarters: Ellicott City, MD, U.S.
- Number of locations: 1
- Key people: List: Michael Horn (President & CEO); Michael Renegar (Vice President and Licensing Director); Kate Horn (Director of Operations); Ken Lilly (Vice President of Production)
- Products: Toys, action figures
- Divisions: Factory X

Palisades Entertainment, LLC, better known as Palisades Toys, was an American manufacturing and distributing toy and collectibles company geared toward the adult collector market. Established in 1994, the company generally worked within the same vein as competitors such as McFarlane Toys and NECA, producing detailed action figures, statues, plushes, and other collectibles of licensed properties up until its bankruptcy in 2006. Palisades also developed the brand Factory X which continues under Limited by CAS Inc.

== Public relations and products ==
Palisades was notable for its close relationship and commonality with toy fans. The official message board served as one of the company's strongest communication platforms where President and CEO Mike Horn and other employees would directly discuss their products with consumers. In fact, polls were often held to let fans decide upcoming products, and news coverage of the company frequently stemmed from Palisades' forum discussion. Horn and his wife, Kate, were also reachable through the buyer's office. The company's concern with adequate distribution of merchandise forced it to introduce Palisades Collector's Club. This offered exclusive figures and came in response to reports of difficulty in obtaining the Vanishing Cream Beaker figure.

In terms of product quality, Palisades set high standards, particularly with its array of action figures. Such attributes included strong attention to detail and likeness, a high rate of joint articulation and bountiful accessories with tedious working functions. The company frequently employed designers from the fan community of each property they licensed and always credited staff and contributors on packages. Palisades also assigned help from various groups such as the painting and sculpting talents of Plan B Toys and accessory work by Industrial Zoo. The Muppet Show collection, celebrating the shows 25th anniversary, would become one of Palisades' flagship licenses. The line lasted nine series through 2002-2004 and included various convention and store exclusive figures as well as expansive playset. Aside from the aforementioned qualities, it also boasted an innovative technique in which a magnet placed inside the figure's head would allow its magnetically equipped hat to sit firmly in place. This eliminated the need for an unsightly hole in the top the figure's head, which was the traditional way of attaching a hat (via peg).

In 2001, Palisades acquired the license to produce Star Trek figures to commemorate its 35th anniversary. Concept designs were soon being developed and aimed for a style similar to the Playmates Toys' previous Star Trek line. However, due to such comprehensive plans, the figures were never produced.

In October 2003, Fun-4-All unveiled plans to produce Sesame Street action figures but had only developed prototypes before its bankruptcy in mid-2004. A few months later, Palisades obtained the hot license. The debut of this collection was culminated by the 2005 convention exclusive Super Grover with box art by Alex Ross. As one of the most highly anticipated figure lines at the time, the first series of Sesame Street was intended for a mid-2005 release but came to a stirring delay. In fact, two series of figures were planned, and many photos of the fully developed, packaged figure prototypes were released to the public. But according to Horn, the line would ultimately never come to fruition, due to lack of retailer support. This same problem haunted with The Muppet Show and led to its cancellation that same year.

In January 2004, Palisades acquired Factory X for an undisclosed sum.

== Distribution ==
Palisades products were sold throughout the world at various retail outlets including Toys R Us, KB Toys, Target, Electronics Boutique, Tower Records, Media Play, Sam Goody, Suncoast Video, and various comic shops. Due to the selectivity of the company's products, however, this range of retailers would eventually narrow to a select few and play a significant part in Palisades' floundering success.

On August 1, 2005, Palisades began a partnership with Blister Direct that made them the exclusive distributor of Palisades merchandise in Japan. On September 18, Diamond Comics Distributors became Palisades' sole distributor of North America.

== Financial trouble and bankruptcy ==
While generally praised by the toy community, Palisades' devotion to adult collectors proved financially cumbersome. Many products laid within a niche market of fans or were simply unusual in scale or design; an example would be Mega Meatwad, a 5½" tall, non-articulated figure of the simple, limbless character. Yet quality and large supply were being exerted on such selective merchandise. Despite the level of production, Palisades' also offered some of its merchandise at considerably low prices compared to similar high-end products within the industry. A combination of these factors may have attributed to deep expense on behalf of the acclaimed toy company.

=== Micronauts dilemma ===
However, the biggest blow to Palisades would be during the production of Micronauts, Series 1. The company initially was given the impression that it would have access to the original Micronauts molds and tooling which would reduce production effort. This would not be the case, however, and plans were scaled back as everything would have to be built from scratch. Curiously, Takara would have no part in this Micronauts revival, so Palisades began seeking out vintage samples from fans to help its development.

Throughout mid-late 2002, according to former Palisades toy designer Bryan Wilkinson, reports from China on the in-development line were positive. However, it would later be discovered that Ken Lilly, who was head of Palisades’ product development, had been deceived by a company acting as Palisades' middleman responsible for subcontracting the factory. By this point, a significant percentage of the commission was paid to the middleman, and the other portion was to be paid after contract fulfillment. This middleman apparently had no intention of ever collecting the rest, and instead, kept most of the money while farming out the production to another facility to develop the toys for a fraction of the cost and with no quality control. The middleman never received the rest of its money and vanished when pursued by Palisades.

With numerous errors and mispackaged and defective parts, employees were appalled at the result, but at this stage, financial losses on the part of Palisades would be inevitable. Not only was the Micronauts line affected, but other lines assigned to the factory at the time, such as part of the early The Muppet Show series, suffered though not as heavily.

Adding to the strain was slow shipment due to the U.S. dock workers' union dispute and lockout in October 2002. Already over-budget Palisades quickly addressed the poor quality but had few resorts and only one employee to handle it. The company could only replace badly damaged returned toys with other poor quality product which, according to Wilkinson, "might have been their worst mistake from a public relations point of view, as some felt that this indicated they were trying to still push and mark up known defective product." Nevertheless, while financial recovery would be impossible, Palisades attempted to salvage their reputation and pride with a second Micronauts series, a retooled Series 1, and a special Series 1.5, working more closely with the manufacturers this time. However, the company lost even more money in doing so, and retailers lost interest. A third series was put in development as a last attempt at redemption but canceled. The Micronauts revival would result in "an albatross for Palisades, their biggest financial loss ever."

=== Cancellations and demise ===
Problems with Palisades became evident as early as mid-2005. A forum poll from last year let fans choose a Muppet pack-in character or accessory. However, due to a growing retailer disinterest in the line, the winning item, which was a cow, would not be released. Later that year, The Muppet Show was canceled entirely, after which Ken Lilly had posted the tentative lineup for series 10 through 14 on their message board. Four items of the series were released while all of the rest never made it past the prototype or planning stages. These consisted of basic, Mega, and Mini figures, in addition to playsets such as the massive Muppet Theatre stage.

In November, a press release by President Mike Horn detailed the long-standing delay on Palisades' hotly anticipated Sesame Street action figure line:

"There's not one person on the planet who wants this product line out more than me. It's been alluded to numerous times, but I'll say it here, on the record. The delays on this (and other) lines are directly related to the general lack of retail support. There's simply not enough orders to justify the massive production costs. That said, we are proceeding with production (and likely losing a ton of money in the process) so that we can try to get some momentum started and to satisfy collector desires." In addition, Horn said "I regret to inform you that after more than 11 successful years, Palisades Entertainment, LLC has discontinued its business of manufacturing and selling licensed and proprietary action figures, collectibles, toys and other goods. This development parallels a general trend within the toy industry"

News from the company became scarce in the following months, and it was reported that shortly before Christmas, a large number of key staff members were released. Palisades also did not appear at the 2005 Wizard World Dallas, 2006 UK ToyFair, or 2006 US ToyFair where they would typically have had a significant presence.

Finally, on February 1, 2006, Palisades announced its bankruptcy and subsequent sale of the company to Limited by CAS Inc. Horn discussed the situation in a press release noting, "This development parallels a general trend within the toy industry, including the bankruptcy of one of Palisades’ largest customers." While Limited continued Palisades' Factory X branch of statues and prop replicas, Horn and his wife were not offered positions in the transaction.

Aside from Sesame Street, the sudden disestablishment of Palisades had left several other planned products left unreleased. Those who bought the first series of Aqua Teen Hunger Force figures, for example, would not be able to complete their set with the second series intended for a February 2006 release.

== Licenses ==
- Adult Swim
- Alien
- Army of Darkness
- Buffy the Vampire Slayer
- Crimson
- Crittaz
- Die Hard
- Mortal Kombat
- Dragon Ball
- The Fairly OddParents
- Final Fantasy
- Freakables
- G.I. Joe
- Invader Zim
- Micronauts
- The Muppet Show
- Pink Panther
- Predator
- The Ren & Stimpy Show
- Reservoir Dogs
- Resident Evil
- Rising Stars
- Sesame Street
- The House of the Dead
- The Simpsons
- Sleepy Hollow
- Space Channel 5
- Star Trek
- Transformers
- Trigun
- Underworld
- X-Files
