= Jet Jungle =

Early seventies scifi adventure hero

Logo.

Jet Jungle is the name of an early seventies sci-fi adventure hero, who appeared in a hit radio play broadcast on South Africa's Springbok Radio as well as a Sunday comic of the same name. The main character Jet Jungle was created by the advertising agency of the sponsors, Jungle Oats and Black Cat Peanut Butter in 1972. The advertising agency developed the script for the first series on Springbok Radio. Jeff Shapiro was the first actor to voice 'Jet Jungle' in the first year with Diane Wilson as 'Samantha "Sam" Muller' and Victor Melleney as 'Professor Giuseppe "Spaghetti" Villetti'. Brian O'Shaughnessy became the lead writer and created all episodes from the second year onwards. He also took over the role of voicing 'Jet Jungle' for the duration of the show on Springbok Radio. It is known to be one of the longest running radio shows created for the youth at the time (1972-1985).

== Synopsis ==
Jet Jungle appeared with his black leopard Jupiter, red-headed lady friend Samantha Muller (Diane Wilson, Diane Appleby, Erica Rogers) and scientist and faithful friend Prof. Giuseppe "Spaghetti" Villetti (Victor Melleney, Gordon Mulholland). The team would routinely fly off from their island headquarters, Orion's Peak, in a Vertijet at the behest of their government liaison "the Minister", to battle criminal masterminds and the occasional extraterrestrial menace.

== Presentation ==
The show was broadcast every weekday late in the afternoon on South Africa's radio service, Springbok Radio from 1972 continuing until the station's close, with the last episode broadcast on December 30, 1985. It was also broadcast on Radio Rhodesia in Rhodesia, the present day Zimbabwe. It is not known how many of the episodes were actually recorded, or how many of them were rebroadcast, since so little of the Springbok Radio archive exists. There appear to be parts of scripts, sound bytes and several mixed episode recordings from different storylines available, and a number of archivists have attempted to preserve the work.

== Sponsorship ==
The successful show was used to promote South African products Black Cat Peanut Butter and Jungle Oats, both owned by Tiger Brands. Jet Jungle attributed his powers of persuasion to the use of special ingredients, and his mastery of time, caused as a result of exposure to the Star Master, a mysterious entity. They appeared in several episodes similar in vein to the Project Farstar episodes.

Sample of the weekly magazine b&w comic

== Tie-ins ==
The long-running show had a children's fan club with regular newsletters featuring a one-page black-and-white comic strip serial, which was syndicated in various publications such as Personality. A short-lived full colour Sunday newspaper comic strip followed. A Jet Jungle action figure was produced by Mego Corporation in the 1970s and "rediscovered" by the Mego Museum in 2005.

For the Silver Jubilee in 1975, Springbok Radio produced a once-off one-hour comedy show titled 'The Great Gong Robbery' which featured (inter alia) a parody of Jet Jungle, who ultimately solves the mystery and exposes Jupiter as the thief.

== Characters ==
- Jet Jungle In advertising images, Jet Jungle was portrayed as a muscular white man in his prime with a full head of neatly cropped white hair wearing a jet-black superhero body suit with boots leaving only his hands and face exposed.
- Jupiter, Jet's black leopard, who fearlessly fights evil. Jupiter was referred to as a 'black leopard' by the show's characters, rather than a panther.
- Samantha Muller Red haired lady, initially portrayed as wearing a green one-piece short sleeved legless jumpsuit and green boots.
- Prof. Giuseppe "Spaghetti" Valetti, the slim bespectacled middle-aged Professor had wavy black greying hair and mustache and was always smartly attired in a white Italian suit and bow tie.
- Dr Ket, American space expert.
- The Star Master a time-lord of the fourth dimension
- The Minister variously, a good guy and bad guy. Jet's contact in a cloak and dagger government department with links to international intelligence agencies.
- Zack, an 8-year-old boy

== Audio history ==
In 2009, Radio Researchers uncovered several episodes of this program. These are twenty episodes of a storyline entitled 'Project Farstar'.

The Jet Jungle theme tune is probably the most striking and distinguishing feature of the series, aside from the all-in-one black suit, vertijet and black leopard.

Words to the Theme tune are: When your world is in trouble / and you need a fighting friend / who will come on the double and keep fighting to the end /Get Jet! Get Jet! / Jet Jungle is the man to get! Jet Jungle. Jet Jungle Jet Jungle is the man to get! / Get Jet!

Since television broadcasts only came to South Africa in 1976, the country had followed the Apollo Moon missions on radio. The series thus fed the popular imagination about outer-space and children's delight in hearing what would become a virtual retelling of the saga in the form of a fairy-tale. Africa's participation in the event, which sent Jet Jungle and Jupiter as far out as Andromeda, told of things to come. In Project Far Star, Prof Spaghetti voices his concern about defeating the forces of Einsteinian space-time, "going out young and coming back old".

Voices heard on the radio programme include Jeff Shapiro, Diane Wilson, Victor Melleney, Hal Orlandini, Brian O'Shaughnessy, Diane Appleby, Erica Rogers, and Gordon Mulholland.

=== Jet Jungle on Springbok Radio (1972 - 1985) ===
- The Water Madness (first year, first story, five episodes)
- The Time Bender (first year, second story, five episodes);
- Project Farstar (second year, first story, 20 episodes);
- The Sun Gliders (second year, second story, 20 episodes);
- The Cave Man (1979, 20 episodes).

=== Jet Jungle on Radio South Africa (1991 - 1992) ===
- The Astrals (1991 to 1992, 118 episodes, different format).

== Comic history ==
There are several digital images of the weekly comic available online. Other examples may be viewed in any one of South Africa's legal deposit libraries.

=== Comic Episodes ===
- Scent of Death;
- KGB Affair;
- Doppelganger;
- Kung Fu contract;
- Doomsgate;
- The Black Star;
- Operation Omega.

== Merchandise ==
Besides the action figure produced by Mego and now recreated by loyal fans, listeners and readers could purchase the "Jet Jungle Bicycle" from OK Bazaars, a South African home furnisher. A fan-club image posted online in a Mego forum shows a boy riding an orange chopper.

There is only one boxed example of the Jet Jungle figure known to exist in the World today. Since its discovery in 2005, this sole example was reputed to have exchanged hands privately at the staggering price of $20,000 us. A price record for a single Mego figure.

The Jet Jungle Mego figure, a complete boxed edition still with its original packaging, sold for $5,713.98 after 11 bids, on eBay in 2009.

A $15 "Limited-Edition 8-inch figure of only 500 produced" was released by TJ Toys sometime after the winning bid. The figure was bagged not boxed.

In 1971, Martin Abrams began purchasing the license rights to popular movies, comic books and television shows for Mego Corp., a toy manufacturing company. Mego produced a variety of dolls in the 1970s and 1980s until the company went bankrupt in 1983, whereupon the rights to produce the Jet Jungle figurine would ostensibly have reverted to its creator.

The first Jet Jungle Mego figure to appear on the internet was in 2003 on Megocentral.com. Laurie Halbritter, the then owner of Megocentral.com, purchased one on an auction from Italy. Photos were sent to various collectors but the identity of the figure was not confirmed until the boxed one surfaced in 2005.
