= Playthings (magazine) =

Trade magazine focusing on toys and games (1903–2010)

- Editor-in-chief: Maria N. Weiskott
- Former editors: Editors-in-chief Robert McCready (1903–1945); Ben McCready (1945–1980); Frank Reysen Jr. (1980–2000)
- Categories: Toy, game, and related Entertainment industries
- Frequency: monthly
- Founder: Robert McCready; Henry C. Nathan
- Founded: 1902
- First issue: January 1903
- Final issue: Fall 2010
- Company: Sandow Media
- Country: USA
- Based in: New York City
- Language: English
- Website: www.playthings.com (defunct) www.giftsanddec.com/channel/160-playthings (also defunct)
- ISSN: 0032-1567

Playthings was an American trade magazine focusing on the toy and game industry. It was founded in 1902 by editor Robert McCready and publisher Henry C. Nathan, and it was published in physical form by Sandow Media on a monthly basis until Fall 2010 when it became an insert section and was merged with Gifts & Decorative Accessories magazine. Playthings was also published online and supplemented by a weekly email newsletter, Playthings Extra. The magazine won multiple Jesse H. Neal Awards, and was generally regarded as the premier trade magazine of the American toy industry.

== Historical timeline ==
- 1902 – Playthings is founded by editor Robert McCready and publisher Henry C. Nathan (Henry Nathan Co.).
- January 1903 – The inaugural issue is published. In his opening statement, editor-in-chief McCready describes it as "a regular publication, devoted to ... the more than 20,000 concerns [in the United States] engaged in the manufacture or sale of dolls, toys, and games." The magazine is 20 pages in length and covers more than 70% European and Asian toys (mostly German and Japanese imports).
- January 1904 – Subscription rate and distribution increases. Marking the 1-year anniversary, McCready reports that "the trade has manifested a cordial interest in us, and has given us hearty support."
- 1905 – The magazine's primary emphasis settles on coverage of merchants' money-saving techniques and the management of store layout and displays.
- June 1910 – Robert McCready founds the McCready Publishing Co. which takes over publication of the magazine from the Henry Nathan Co. McCready serves as the president of publication as well as the editor-in-chief and business manager of the magazine.
- June 1912 – The magazine now comprises 198 pages including a few two-color advertisements.
- 1915–1940 – Two World Wars strongly impact the importing of foreign toys, and the magazine becomes almost entirely devoted to American-made toys. Distribution now includes international subscribers, but pro-American sentiment is high and the magazine highlights American interests and events like the American International Toy Fair.
- April 1930 – The magazine swells to 290 pages.
- 1945 – Ben McCready, son of Robert McCready, is appointed editor-in-chief.
- 1950s – Playthings begins to promote the idea of toy purchasing as a year-round practice rather than primarily a Christmas-related phenomenon.
- 1960s – Visual mass media in the form of television introduce children to a range of celebrities and characters that are soon represented as dolls and action figures. The magazine begins to cover television-related toys and reaches its maximum size with some issues exceeding 600 pages in length.
- 1967 – Publication is taken over by Geyer-McAllister Publications.
- 1970s – Playthings begins to cover the topic of toy safety.
- 1980s – Frank Reysen Jr. becomes the editor-in-chief and the magazine begins to cover electronic games and toys both before and after the 1983 crash beginning with handheld video games and continuing in the late 1980s with video game consoles.
- 1984 – Playthings wins a Jesse H. Neal Award for coverage of the counterfeit toy market.
- 1998 – Playthings is acquired by Reed Business Information which continues publication.
- 2000 – Maria N. Weiskott is appointed editor-in-chief.
- January 2003 – Playthings celebrates its centenary issue with the publication of "Toy Stories: 100 Years of Fun."
- 2005 – The magazine wins a Jesse H. Neal Award for "Best News Coverage" for reporting on the possible breakup of Toys "R" Us.
- 2010 – Reed Business Information sells several properties including Playthings to Sandow Media which publishes the magazine for a few more issues and then merges it with another Sandow Media publication, Gifts & Decorative Accessories in the fall. Playthings becomes an insert section in Gifts & Decorative Accessories.
- October 1, 2010 – Copies of all physical issues of the magazine (between 1903 and 2010) are acquired by the Brian Sutton-Smith Library & Archives of Play at The Strong in Rochester, New York.
- November 12, 2010 – Playthings becomes the official national media partner of The National Toy Hall of Fame at The Strong and enters a 3-year special promotional agreement.
- May 2017 – The Gifts & Decorative Accessories insert section, Playthings, is renamed Kids' Corner.
