= Micronauts =

Action figures

- Type: Action figures
- Invented by: Takara/Mego
- Company: Mego
- Country: United States
- Availability: 1976–1980
- Materials: Plastic/die-cast
- Slogan: "The Interchangeable World of the Micronauts"

Micronauts is a North American science fiction toyline manufactured and marketed by Mego from 1976 to 1980. The Micronauts toyline was based on and licensed from the Microman toyline created by Japanese-based toy company Takara in 1974.

Mego discontinued the Micronauts line in 1980 prior to the company's bankruptcy and dissolution in 1982. Years after Mego's demise, other toy companies, such as Palisades Toys and SOTA (State of the Art) Toys, have attempted to revive the toyline. In 2025, Super7 added Micronauts to their ReAction+ toyline.

== Description ==
The Micronauts toyline consisted of 3.75-inch tall (9.5 cm) action figures which were known for their high number of articulation points relative to other toys of similar size and scale in the 1970s. The toyline also included vehicles, robots, playsets and accessories. Many of the Micronauts toys used interchangeable 5-millimetre (0.20 in) connectors and ports that allowed parts to be transferred and connected between different toys.

== History ==
=== Takara ===
A Mego (U.S.) Acroyear (Red) action figure which was based on the Takara (Japan) Acroyear 2 (A311 Mad Pink)

Takara first released Microman toys in Japan in 1974 as a smaller version of their popular 8-inch-tall (20 cm) and 12-inch-tall (30 cm) 1972 Henshin Cyborg (Transforming Cyborg) line. Henshin Cyborg figures were based on Combat Joe figures—which themselves were based on Hasbro's G.I. Joe figures—with their bodies molded in clear plastic, exposing their inner workings and supposed cybernetic parts.

By downscaling their size, Takara sought to create a toyline that would offset the sheer cost of producing a full line of plastic-based figures and related playsets as well as acknowledging that basic living space is limited for most Japanese households. Smaller Microman figures would not only cost less to produce during the energy crisis of the 1970s, but also the line's smaller scale would take up less physical space in a household and thus be more attractive to space conscious consumers in the Japanese market.

In Japan, the Microman figures themselves were marketed as actually being 3.75-inch-tall (9.5 cm) cyborg entities that hailed from a fictional planet known as "Micro Earth" and disguised themselves as action figures while on Earth.

=== Mego ===
A Micronauts Biotron toy

In 1976, Mego licensed several Microman toys from Takara and marketed the toyline in North America and other countries as Micronauts. During their initial series 1 and series 2 release, Takara produced small quantities of products in Japan before production was officially moved to Mego's facilities in Hong Kong.

While much of the initial Micronaut toyline offerings were simply repackaged versions of Takara Microman equivalents, some items in the Micronaut toyline were original Mego creations that used modified and reconfigured parts from existing Takara toys. For example, the larger, 6.5-inch (17 cm) magnetic action figures Baron Karza and Force Commander were re-colorings of the Magnemo Kotetsu Jeeg action figures with newly designed heads. In addition, as the Micronaut line grew in popularity, Mego expanded the line by creating whole new figures from scratch such as the "Aliens" line which included Antron, Repto, Membros, Lobros, Kronos and Centaurus.

The Micronaut toyline sold extremely well for Mego. According to Neal Kublan, Mego's Executive VP of Marketing/Vice President of Mego Research & Development (1972-1980), the line generated more than $32 million in sales for the $110 million company during one period.

After Mego's 1982 bankruptcy and dissolution, the original molds for many of the toys were sold to Hourtoys/M&D Toys for their Interchangables discount toyline, other original molds were sold to PAC Toys for use in their Lords of Light toyline and even Takara produced several series 5 toys for Italian licensee/distributor Gig's i Micronauti line. Additionally, leftover Micronaut toyline stock from Mego's production run was eventually sold for sale/clearance in North America by Lion Rock Limited under the Micronauts name.

==== Mego Micronaut releases ====
Below is a basic overview list of Mego Micronaut toys with size/scale, release dates and Mego series numbers as well as cross-referenced information connected to the Takara equivalent toys they were based on, Microman and otherwise. This is not meant to be a comprehensive list of all Mego releases/variants but rather a high-level overview of their Micronaut line offerings.

Mego Micronaut releases
Micronauts (Mego)						Microman & equivalent toys (Takara)	
Name	Part#	Type	Size/Scale	Release date	Series	Name	Release date
Acroyear	71003	Action Figure	3.75-inch (9.5 cm)	1976	1	Acroyear 2 (A31X)	1975
Astro Station	71061	Base-Playset	3.75-inch (9.5 cm)	1976	1	Microman Connig Station Base	1975
Biotron	71053	Tron	13-inch (33 cm)	1976	1	Robotman	1975
Crater Cruncher	71031	Vehicle	3.75-inch (9.5 cm)	1976	1	Machine Car #3: Bull Crane	1975
Galactic Cruiser	71020	Vehicle	3.75-inch (9.5 cm)	1976	1	MIC-01: Space Buggy	1974
Galactic Warrior	71002	Action Figure	3.75-inch (9.5 cm)	1976	1	Super Steel Microman (M22X)	1975
Hydra	71021	Vehicle	3.75-inch (9.5 cm)	1976	1	MIC-02: Bulk Lifter	1974
Hydro Copter	71051	Vehicle	3.75-inch (9.5 cm)	1976	1	Mecha-Cosmo: Marine Copter	1975
Microtron	71050	Tron	3.75-inch (9.5 cm)	1976	1	Micro Robot-1	1976
Mobile Exploration Lab (M.E.L.)	71060	Ship	3.75-inch (9.5 cm)	1976	1	M115 Conning Tower Base	1974
Photon Sled	71032	Vehicle	3.75-inch (9.5 cm)	1976	1	Machine Car #4: Super Jet	1975
Space Glider	71001	Action Figure	3.75-inch (9.5 cm)	1976	1	Super Steel Microman (M21X)	1975
Stratastation	71061	Base-Playset	3.75-inch (9.5 cm)	1976	1	Road Station Base	1975
Time Traveler	71000	Action Figure	3.75-inch (9.5 cm)	1976	1	Microman (M10X)	1975
Ultronic Scooter	71030	Vehicle	3.75-inch (9.5 cm)	1976	1	Machine Car #2: Auto Buggy	1975
Warp Racer	71033	Vehicle	3.75-inch (9.5 cm)	1976	1	Machine Car #1: Formula Z	1975
Acroyear II	71015	Action Figure	3.75-inch (9.5 cm)	1977	2	Acroyear (A30X)	1975
Andromeda	71006	Magno Figure	6.5-inch (17 cm)	1977	2	Magnemo: Panzeroid	1975
Baron Karza	71005	Magno Figure	6.5-inch (17 cm)	1977	2	Magnemo: Kotetsu Jeeg	1975
Battle Cruiser	71054	Ship	3.75-inch (9.5 cm)	1977	2	Micro Base: Transfer Fortress	1976
Force Commander	71035	Magno Figure	6.5-inch (17 cm)	1977	2	Magnemo: Kotetsu Jeeg	1975
Giant Acroyear	71055	Tron	3.75-inch (9.5 cm)	1977	2	Giant Acroyear	1977
Neon Orbiter	71038	Vehicle	3.75-inch (9.5 cm)	1977	2	Spy Car #4: Drag Tiger	1976
Oberon	71034	Magno Figure	6.5-inch (17 cm)	1977	2	Magnemo: Panzeroid	1975
Pharoid	71004	Action Figure	3.75-inch (9.5 cm)	1977	2	Microman Command 2 (M16X)	1977
Rhodium Orbiter	71036	Vehicle	3.75-inch (9.5 cm)	1977	2	Gōdam 5: Geso Machine	1976
Thorium Orbiter	71037	Vehicle	3.75-inch (9.5 cm)	1977	2	Spy Car #6: Jet Mirror	1976
Alphatron	71027	Tron	3.75-inch (9.5 cm)	1978	3		
Aquatron	71040	Vehicle	3.75-inch (9.5 cm)	1978	3	Spy Car #1: Marine Condor	1976
Betatron	71028	Tron	3.75-inch (9.5 cm)	1978	3		
Galactic Defender	71016	Action Figure	3.75-inch (9.5 cm)	1978	3	Microman Command 3 (M17X)	1977
Gammatron	71029	Tron	3.75-inch (9.5 cm)	1978	3		
Micropolis: Galactic Command Center	71072	Deluxe Set	3.75-inch (9.5 cm)	1978	3	Play Build Series: Build Base	1978
Micropolis: Interplanetary Headquarters	71071	Deluxe Set	3.75-inch (9.5 cm)	1978	3	Play Build Series: Build Base	1978
Micropolis: Microrail City	71073	Deluxe Set	3.75-inch (9.5 cm)	1978	3	Play Build Series: Build Base	1978
Micropolis: Satellite Survey Station	71070	Deluxe Set	3.75-inch (9.5 cm)	1978	3	Play Build Series: Build Base	1978
Nemesis	71049	Tron	3.75-inch (9.5 cm)	1978	3	Micro Robot-1	1976
Phobos	71056	Tron	3.75-inch (9.5 cm)	1978	3	Robotman	1975
Star Searcher	71063	Vehicle	3.75-inch (9.5 cm)	1978	3	Surveyor-1	1977
Antron	71022	ALIEN Figure	3.75-inch (9.5 cm)	1979	4		
Deluxe Rocket Tubes	71084	Deluxe Set	3.75-inch (9.5 cm)	1979	4		
Hornetroid	71057	Ship	3.75-inch (9.5 cm)	1979	4		
Karrio	71080	Carry Case	24.1-inch (61 cm)	1979	4		
Membros	71024	ALIEN Figure	3.75-inch (9.5 cm)	1979	4		
Micropolis: Mega City	71074	Deluxe Set	3.75-inch (9.5 cm)	1979	4		
Repto	71023	ALIEN Figure	3.75-inch (9.5 cm)	1979	4		
Rocket Tubes	71083	Deluxe Set	3.75-inch (9.5 cm)	1979	4		
Solarion	71042	Vehicle	3.75-inch (9.5 cm)	1979	4		
Star Defender	71064	Ship	3.75-inch (9.5 cm)	1979	4	Surveyor-3	1977
Taurion	71041	Vehicle	3.75-inch (9.5 cm)	1979	4		
Terraphant	71059	Vehicle	3.75-inch (9.5 cm)	1979	4		
Ampzilla	71044	Vehicle	3.75-inch (9.5 cm)	1980	5		
Blizzard	71013	Tron	3.75-inch (9.5 cm)	1980	5	Blizzard	1980
Centaurus	71019	ALIEN Figure	3.75-inch (9.5 cm)	1980	5		
Emperor	71011	Magno Figure	6.5-inch (17 cm)	1980	5	Magnemo: Kotetsu Jeeg	1975
Green Baron	71009	Magno Figure	6.5-inch (17 cm)	1980	5	Magnemo: Kotetsu Jeeg	1975
Hyperion	71043	Vehicle	3.75-inch (9.5 cm)	1980	5	Timanic NicMachine 2	1978
King Atlas	71007	Magno Figure	6.5-inch (17 cm)	1980	5	Magnemo: Kotetsu Jeeg	1975
Kronos	71017	ALIEN Figure	3.75-inch (9.5 cm)	1980	5		
Lantaurion	71008	Magno Figure	6.5-inch (17 cm)	1980	5	Magnemo: Panzeroid	1975
Lobros	71018	ALIEN Figure	3.75-inch (9.5 cm)	1980	5		
Lobstros	71046	Vehicle	3.75-inch (9.5 cm)	1980	5		
Megas	71012	Magno Figure	6.5-inch (17 cm)	1980	5	Magnemo: Panzeroid	1975
Pegasus	71010	Magno Figure	6.5-inch (17 cm)	1980	5	Magnemo: Panzeroid	1975
Red Falcon	71014	Magno Figure	6.5-inch (17 cm)	1980	5	Death Cross	1975
Sharkos	71045	Vehicle	3.75-inch (9.5 cm)	1980	5		

=== Palisades Toys ===
In 2002, Palisades Toys acquired the rights to manufacture a new line of Micronauts toys from Abrams Gentile Entertainment, LLC, the company which was formed in the aftermath of Mego's collapse to retain and manage Mego's licensing contracts, rights and deals. This licensing agreement was done by Palisades under the assumption that the original manufacturing tooling and molds from the 1970s Mego toyline were still available. When Palisades discovered the manufacturing tooling and molds were not available, it turned to the Micronaut/Microman collector's community to donate vintage toys so Palisades could create new molds to replicate the figures. Most of the Palisades reissues were Mego Micronaut figures based on Takara designs, but several original alien designs from the original Mego toyline (such as Repto, Membros and Centaurus) were included in the line as well.

When initial manufacturing of the Palisades figures was completed and the new, retro line shipped to consumers and stores, many figures were found to have defective or broken parts caused by manufacturing practices followed by the first Chinese factory. Many consumers who returned defective merchandise were inadvertently given defective replacements by Palisades.

Facing these issues, Palisades developed the Series 2 figures which utilized other, more reputable factories in China, but ended up losing more money than expected. As a result, retailers were wary of carrying the new Micronauts toyline, which resulted in the abrupt cancellation of a third series which was already in development. The whole series of events contributed to Palisades' bankruptcy in 2006.

==== Palisades Toys Micronaut releases ====
Below is a basic overview list of Palisades Toys Micronaut toys with size/scale and release dates. This is not meant to be a comprehensive list of all Palisades Toys releases/variants but rather a high-level overview of their Micronaut line offerings.

Palisades Toys Micronaut releases
Name	Type	Size/Scale	Release date	Series
Acroyear	Action Figure	3.75-inch (9.5 cm)	2002	1
Baron Karza & Andromeda	Action Figure	6.5-inch (17 cm)	2002	1
Membros	Action Figure	3.75-inch (9.5 cm)	2002	1
Force Commander & Oberon	Action Figure	6.5-inch (17 cm)	2002	1
Time Traveler	Action Figure	3.75-inch (9.5 cm)	2002	1
Space Glider	Action Figure	3.75-inch (9.5 cm)	2002	1
Battle Acroyear	Action Figure	3.75-inch (9.5 cm)	2003	1.5
Radioactive Membros	Action Figure	3.75-inch (9.5 cm)	2003	1.5
Space Commander	Action Figure	3.75-inch (9.5 cm)	2003	1.5
Time Traveler Medic	Action Figure	3.75-inch (9.5 cm)	2003	1.5
Centaurus	Action Figure	3.75-inch (9.5 cm)	2003	2
Emperor & Megas	Action Figure	6.5-inch (17 cm)	2003	2
Galactic Defender	Action Figure	3.75-inch (9.5 cm)	2003	2
Pharoid	Action Figure	3.75-inch (9.5 cm)	2003	2
Red Falcon	Action Figure	6.5-inch (17 cm)	2003	2
Repto	Action Figure	3.75-inch (9.5 cm)	2003	2

=== SOTA Toys ===
In 2005, SOTA (State of the Art) Toys unveiled plans for a collector's toyline called "Micronauts: Evolution" which would be a redesign of the Micronauts figures presented in a slightly larger 6-inch (15 cm) size. Concept art was released and prototypes displayed at the 2005 Toy Fair, with a projected release of late 2005. The figures appeared at the 2006 San Diego Comic-Con.

The initial series was planned to include 6-inch (15 cm) renditions of Lobros, Baron Karza, and Space Glider. Plans changed to an online-only box set of all three characters, available on SOTA's website as smaller figures.

In September 2006, SOTA president Jerry Macaluso said "the retail environment for collectibles is in the gutter right now", and many stores wishing to order the "Micronauts: Evolution" line were going bankrupt. He noted that the Palisades line "disaster…had a huge negative effect", with retailers rejecting SOTA's upcoming series. Macaluso hoped to release the line in 2007 before SOTA's license expired, and considered funding it himself but the line was never produced.

==== Proposed SOTA Micronaut releases ====
Below is a basic overview list of proposed SOTA Micronauts releases. Since no products were actually produced this is simply a high-level overview of their proposed Micronaut line offerings.

Proposed SOTA Micronauts releases
Name	Type	Figure size/scale	Release date	Series
Baron Karza	Action Figure	6-inch (15 cm)	2005	1
Lobros	Action Figure	6-inch (15 cm)	2005	1
Space Glider	Action Figure	6-inch (15 cm)	2005	1

=== Hasbro ===
Logo of the Micronauts Pharoid set, released in 2016

In 2016, Hasbro released a limited edition of Micronauts Classic Collection toy set, which included three Micronaut characters: Galactic Warrior, Pharoid and Orbital Defender and featured packaging artwork by artist Ken Kelly. The set debuted at San Diego Comic-Con.

==== Hasbro Micronaut releases ====
Below is a basic overview list of Hasbro Micronaut toys with size/scale and release dates.

Hasbro Micronaut releases
Name	Type	Size/scale	Release date
Galactic Warrior	Action Figure	3.75-inch (9.5 cm)	2016
Orbital Defender	Action Figure	3.75-inch (9.5 cm)	2016
Pharoid	Action Figure	3.75-inch (9.5 cm)	2016

=== Super7 ===
In 2025, Super7 incorporated Micronauts into their ReAction+ action figure line.

Super7 Micronauts releases
Name	Type	Size/scale	Release date
Baron Karza	Action Figure	3.75-inch (9.5 cm)	2025
Biotron	Action Figure	3.75-inch (9.5 cm)	2025
Force Commander	Action Figure	3.75-inch (9.5 cm)	2025
Microtron	Action Figure	3.75-inch (9.5 cm)	2025
Emperor	Action Figure	3.75-inch (9.5 cm)	2026
Time Traveler (Blue)	Action Figure	3.75-inch (9.5 cm)	2026
Time Traveler (Yellow)	Action Figure	3.75-inch (9.5 cm)	2026
Phobos	Action Figure	3.75-inch (9.5 cm)	2026
Time Traveler (Orange)	Action Figure	3.75-inch (9.5 cm)	2026

== In other media ==
=== Comic books ===
Several comic book series based on the Micronauts toyline have been published by Marvel Comics (1979–1986), Image Comics (2002–2003), Devil's Due Publishing (2004), and IDW (2016–2018).

=== Cancelled film ===
In 2009, director J. J. Abrams and his studio Bad Robot were considered to produce a film based on the Micronauts property. In 2013, Rhett Reese and Paul Wernick were working on a screenplay. Wernick said their script was different from the comics, but described the adaptation as "cool and different". The planned project made little progress, but Paramount said at the time that it was still planning a Micronauts film adaptation.

In 2015, Hasbro and Paramount were planning a cinematic universe combining Micronauts with G.I. Joe, Visionaries: Knights of the Magical Light, M.A.S.K. and Rom. A writers' room was formed consisting of Michael Chabon, Brian K. Vaughan, Nicole Perlman, Lindsey Beer, Cheo Hodari Coker, John Francis Daley, Jonathan Goldstein, and others to develop storylines, but it disbanded in 2017.

In 2019, Dean DeBlois was attached as the writer and director of the film. Originally scheduled for October 2020, it was pushed for June 2021, before it was pulled from the release schedule and was presumed to have been cancelled since then.

=== Animation ===
In 1998, AGE, Annex Entertainment, Gribouille and Kaleidoscope Media Group planned to produce an animated series adaptation, starting with a five-part miniseries to air on the Sci Fi Channel in Fall of 1998, followed by a syndicated 26 episode animated series for 1999, accompanied with action figures and a Marvel tie-in comic. The project was later cancelled.

Boulder Media Limited (a then-subsidiary of Hasbro Studios) developed an animated series adaptation since 2018. 52 half-hour episodes were fully produced, with production concluding in January 2020, but the series' release was quietly cancelled. There has been no official announcement regarding its failure to release or its future; executive producer and head writer Eric Rogers has stated that he has received no information from Hasbro on the fate of the show, and has speculated that it was turned into a tax write-off. Other sources refuted this, claiming that Hasbro still hoped to release the series in conjunction with a potential live-action project in the future. The entire series was later anonymously leaked onto the internet in 2025.

== See also ==
- Shogun Warriors
- Transformers
