= Eagle Force =

Military-themed toy line

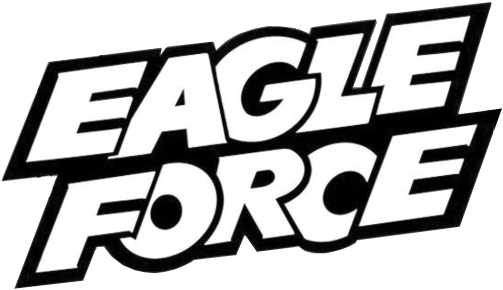
- Product type: Die-cast action figure
- Current owner: Mego
- Country: United States
- Introduced: 1982
- Discontinued: 1983; 43 years ago
- Related brands: G.I. Joe

Eagle Force is a brand of 2 3/4-inch-high (70 mm) die-cast action figure military-themed line marketed by Mego Corporation in the 1980s in the United States. Produced during Ronald Reagan's first term as president, the Eagle Force toy line was marketed to send the message that the United States was not going to be "pushed around" anymore.

Designed by Bill Baron and Paul Kirchner, Eagle Force was similar to the G.I. Joe: A Real American Hero toy line, which was being developed by Hasbro during the same period.

The primary concept of Eagle Force is that it's an elite United States Government counter-terrorist task force organization composed of special forces experts. In their fictional universe, Eagle Force was created to combat the Roving International Organization of Tyranny (R.I.O.T.), a terrorist organization driven by the desire for world domination. Eagle Force is commanded by Captain Eagle, who wears an eye patch. The ethnically diverse cast of Eagle Force members include Big Bro, The Cat, Harley, Kayo, Redwing, Sgt. Brown, Stryker, Turk, Wild Bill, Zapper, and the female figure Goldie Hawk. R.I.O.T. is led by General Mamba, assisted by Baron Von Chill, Beta Man (an arsonist ), Nemesis the Saboteur, Savitar the Ninja, and a Shock Trooper figure.

== Development ==
Mego's Vice President of Research and Development, Bill Baron, came up with the "Eagle Force" concept, which initially was called "Screaming Eagles", the nickname of the U.S. Army's 101st Airborne Division. When Kirchner was brought on board in April 1981, Baron had already sketched up a number of characters, including "Captain Claw" (later named Capt. Eagle), Goldie Hawk (the company assumed this figure would be used as a hostage), and a "hippie" character named "Sleeze" (later named "Tilt" and finally "Zapper"). The characters Turk and "Pot Luk" (later named Kayo) were based on two security guards at the Mego Corporations headquarters. The Baron Von Chill figure was an in-joke based on Bill Baron.

Many of the Eagle Force characters were based on ethnic stereotypes, including Nemesis, an Arab terrorist. General Mamba was originally based on the African military dictator Idi Amin. Because of backlash concerns, General Mamba became Caucasian when his figure hit marketplace, while the Nemesis figure was not marketed in Europe.

The first Eagle Force line included thirteen figures: Captain Eagle, Big Bro, The Cat, Goldie Hawk, Harley, Kayo, Stryker, Turk, Zapper, General Mamba, Beta Man, Savitar, and the Shock Trooper. Mego released five additional figures a short time later: Redwing, Sgt. Brown, Wild Bill, Baron Von Chill, and Nemesis. Vehicles and playsets included a mountain base ("Eagle Mountain"), a jet, two jeeps, and two tanks, all of which were based on existing products so no new high-cost molds had to be created. Eagle Mountain, for instance, was from Marx Toys' The Guns of Navarone playset with a few modifications. (Mego had recently acquired some Marx Toys trademarks and molding tools after that company's assets were liquidated.)

In addition, Mego packaged bundles of products from the Eagle Force toy line in specialized "Adventure Packs": Communications, Ocean Patrol, Tactical, and Bivouac. The company also produced a range of Eagle Force-related comic books (penciled by Kirchner and inked by Ralph Reese), cap guns, and other items.

Slight variations in packaging in the U.S. were common while in production by Mego; later, other companies began producing figures from the same molds. producing still more variations. Outside the United States the Eagle Force lineup included numerous variations in packaging, figure painting, and additional vehicles.

== Product and sales history ==
Eagle Force was heavily promoted at the 1982 American International Toy Fair in New York City.

In the U.S., Eagle Force was sold through Target stores in May 1982, where they instantly sold out. A second wave of figures was scheduled for 1983 release, but Mego abruptly closed down in 1982 so the second series was never produced.

After Mego's demise, Eagle Force action figures were re-released by the Ideal Toy Company (recently having been taken over by CBS Toys), in packages labeled "Strike Force" where "Eagle Force" had been printed on the Mego releases.

Another company subsequently used the Eagle Force molds to create a line of figures called simply "Action Figure", using totally different packaging from Eagle Force packaging. Most of the Action Figure line were painted the same as the Eagle Force line, with a few obvious exceptions, as only a tan skin color was used for the figures' heads. As a result, the African-American Sergeant Brown figure became Caucasian, and the Native American Redwing had a tan head with brown arms.

In 2016, Fresh Monkey Fiction and Remco Toys ran a successful crowd funding campaign to produce a new line of Eagle Force toys under the title "Eagle Force Returns." The new toys will be 4 inch scale and arrived on the market in 2021.

== See also ==
- Dino-Riders by Tyco Toys (also worked on by Paul Kirchner)
- M.A.S.K. by Kenner Products (also worked on by Paul Kirchner)
