= Michael J. Freeman =

American inventor (born 1947)

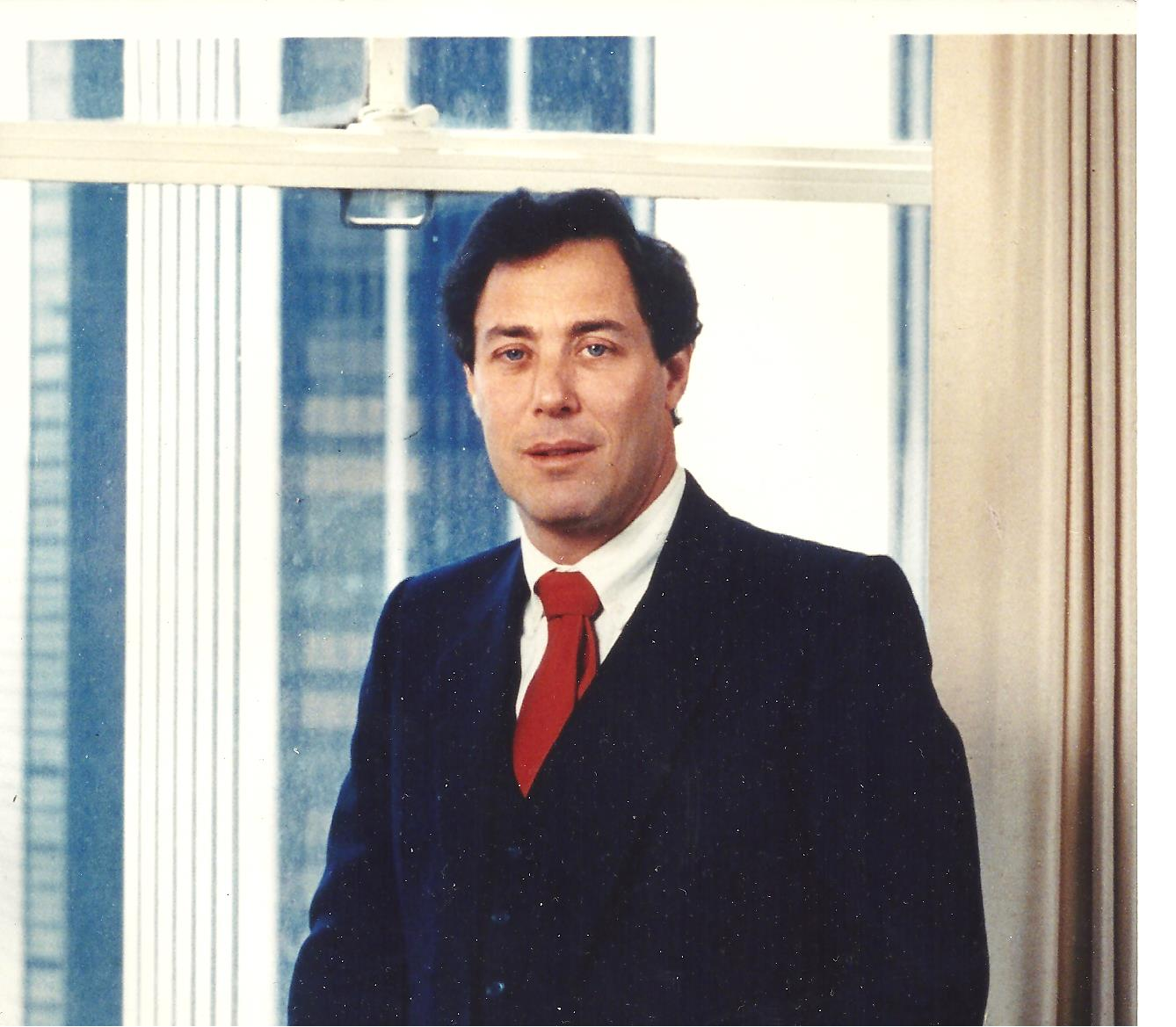
- Born: 1947 (age 78–79)
- Education: City University of New York, Baruch College, City College of New York
- Occupations: Inventor, business and government consultant, educator
- Known for: Robotics, electronic educational toys

Michael J. Freeman (born 1947) is an American inventor who works in trend analysis, advanced behavioral systems, programming of smart toys, cable television and robotics. He was a professor at three American universities and a consultant to business and governments.

== Education and career ==
In 1969, Freeman received his bachelor's degree in Economics and Management from the City College of New York, an MBA in 1970 in Business Management and Economics from Bernard Baruch College, and received his doctorate in 1977 from the City University of New York, majoring in Behavior Sciences and specializing in mental adaptation techniques.

Freeman was a professor at Baruch College of the City University of New York, at Cornell University in Ithaca, New York, and at Hofstra University in the Village of Hempstead, New York. Freeman was the keynote speaker at Harvard University on November 14, 2001, at the conference Innovation, Entrepreneurship and the Future. He is listed in Who's Who in America 1975–2007.

Freeman commercialized approximately forty US patents, and contributed to the work of approximately twenty-five others in educational devices, programming, telephony, laser/special effects, cable TV, and others. Core patent claims include telephone push-button tones as input to the home via branching. Patent claims also covering cable TV, addressability of cable converter boxes, digitization, interactivity, and smart toys. He programmed and did the voice talent for interactive educational programs. Freeman founded a U.S. NASDAQ corporation to further develop patent claims for movie special effects, laser special effects, Hyper TV, and distance learning systems.

== Developments ==
In 1960, at the age of 13, Freeman was awarded first prize in the Westinghouse Science Fair, now known as the Intel International Science and Engineering Fair for his demonstration of rudimentary computer memory. This was one of the first pioneering embodiment of how computer memory could control a physical mechanism. In the 1970s Freeman turned his attention to the future field of verbal output computers.

=== Leachim ===
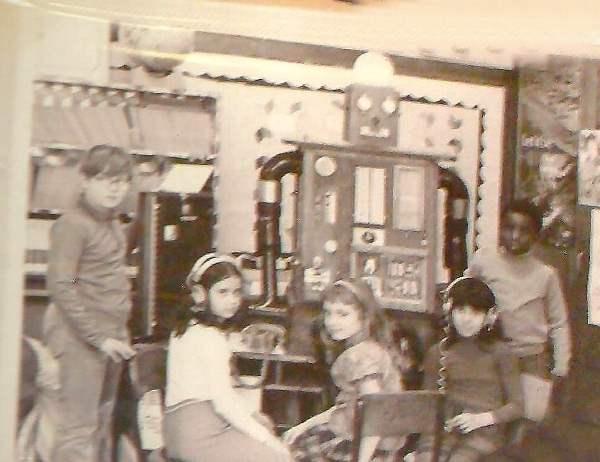
Leachim with 3rd graders, c.1975

In 1974, he created Leachim, a 6 ft (180 cm), 200 lb (91 kg) robot assistant teacher who Freeman programmed with the class curricula, as well as certain biographical information on the 40 students Leachim was programmed to teach. Leachim demonstrated that voice branching could be done quickly enough to replicated understandable speech (i.e. verbal output). This method combined phonemes, words, and sentences to form verbal responsive messages. Leachim was also programmed with biographical information on students, and to simulate "infinite patience". Leachim was tested in a fourth-grade classroom in the Bronx, New York. In 1975, Leachim was reported stolen from the truck transporting it back to New York from a one-hour appearance on The Phil Donahue Show, located in Chicago. Lloyd's of London offered a $7,500 reward based on the insured value of $75,000. Corporate espionage was suspected.

=== Touch-tone phone branching/automated phone menus ===
In 1984, Freeman introduced a telephone branching technology with a recorded voice interactive messaging system, a process where callers hear menu options provided by an automated telephone attendant when a business is reached. The technology is officially called "automated phone menus" or "telephone branching."

== Cable television ==
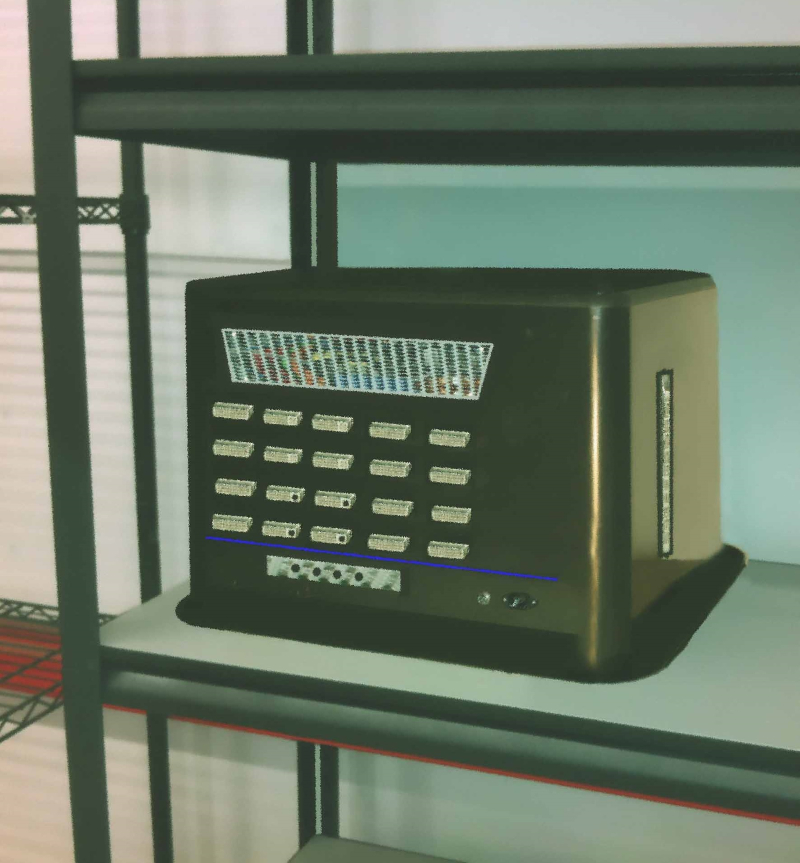
The world's first Telephone Branching Machine invented by Freeman in 1979

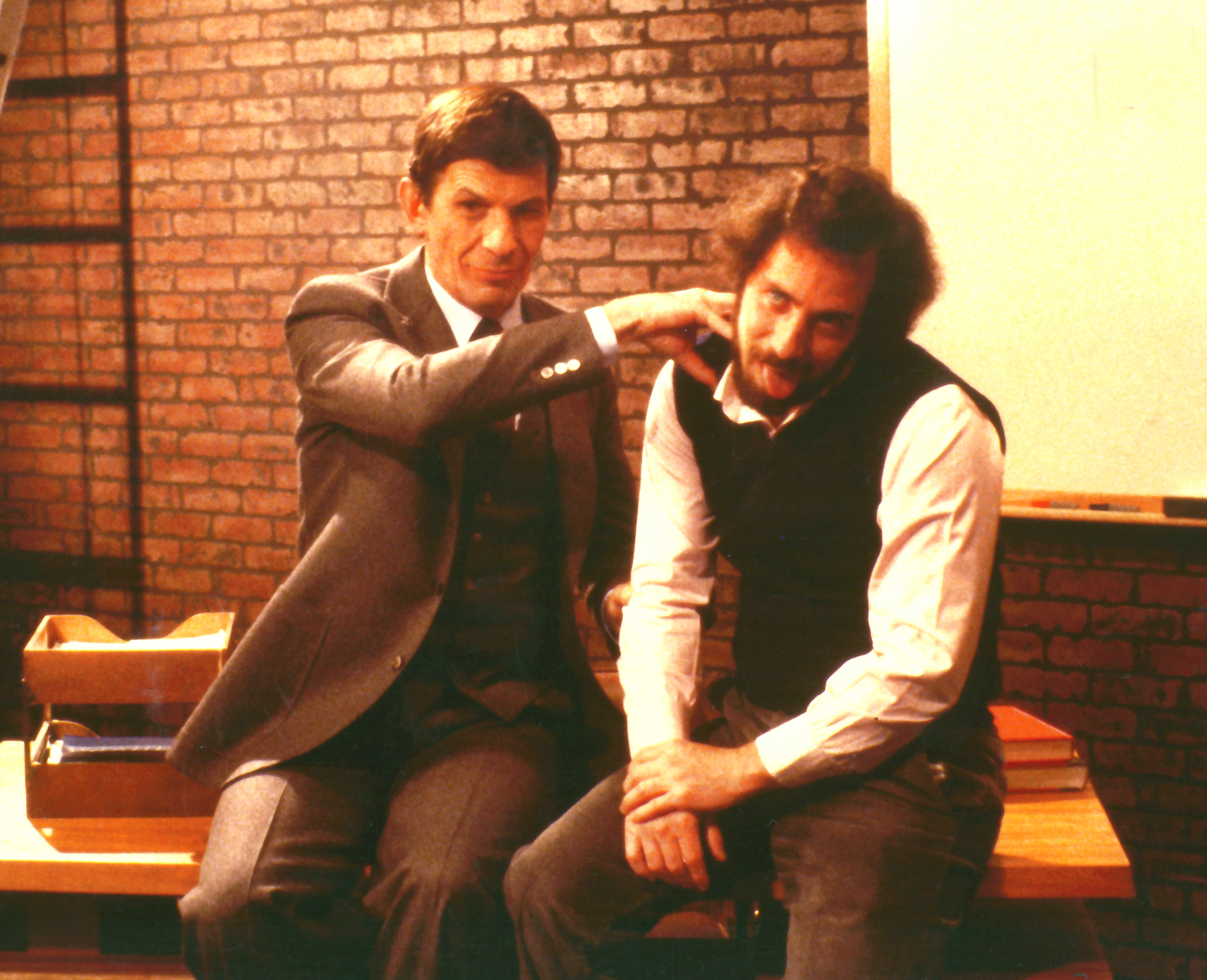
Leonard Nimoy giving Dr. Freeman the Vulcan nerve pinch

=== ACTV Incorporated; two-way cable TV ===
In early 1984, Freeman created core patents for interactive TV and started an American corporation named ACTV Inc., providing cable TV subscribers with interactive programming. He took the company public in 1990 with The Washington Post owning a 25% share, as well as Atari founder Nolan Bushnell. It became a publicly held corporation on May 4, 1990, and partnered with NBC TV and Showtime to test programming. It was listed on the Nasdaq stock exchange. Freeman was the company's CEO and president until 2001. Leonard Nimoy was the company spokesperson. In 1992 Freeman hired John Lack, the founder of MTV, to be president of ACTV Inc.

== Educational toys ==
=== 2-XL ===
In 1975, Freeman licensed 2-XL, considered the first smart toy, to the Mego Corporation, a US-based toy company. The toy was "monumentally successful", a bestseller in the late 1970s. The programs were translated into six foreign languages. A number of board games were created in conjunction with the 2-XL robot.

In 1992, the toy was reintroduced to the marketplace by Tiger Electronics, an American toy company based in Vernon Hills, Illinois. As before, the programmed tapes were translated into many foreign languages and sold internationally. Renowned basketball player Michael Jordan was the official brand ambassador for the new version of 2-XL.

After the 2-XL's success an education division was created to sell tapes to schools and school systems. These tapes were different from the ones for the public market.

=== TV game show spinoff ===
Freeman was one of the executive producers and licensor for a game show spin off of 2-XL named Pick Your Brain starring host Marc Summers. It was a syndicated TV game show. The show starred a giant-size 2-XL robot mock-up; Freeman did not voice the character.

=== Talk 'n Play ===
In 1984, Freeman created an educational game console system named Talk'n Play (also called Electronic Talk'n Play). It was first made by CBS Toys under the brand name Child Guidance in 1984 as Electronic Talk 'n Play. It was later produced by Hasbro under the brand name Playskool in 1986 as Talk'n Play.

=== Kasey the Kinderbot ===
Kasey the Kinderbot toy was designed, developed, and sold by Fisher-Price, a wholly owned subsidiary of Mattel, using an interactive robot concept licensed from Michael J. Freeman.

The toy won awards as best educational toy in 2002, and the Gold Seal award from the Oppenheim Toy Portfolio 2003. Although Kasey's voice was digital, professional female voice artist Kamala Kruszka studio-mastered the initial recordings.

In 2004, the Kasey the Kinderbot line expanded with the introduction of two lower price-point toys named Toby the Totbot and Fetch the Phonicsbot, plus a DVD featuring stories about Kasey. Kasey sold out of Toys R Us.

=== Interactivision ===
In 1986, Freeman licensed a video game system to the View-Master Ideal Toy Company Inc. This system encompassed digital interactivity considered advanced for that time period, and video games were produced by the Walt Disney Company and CTW (Children's Television Workshop). The games initially released were Sesame Street: Let's Learn and Play Together, Sesame Street: Magic on Sesame Street, Sesame Street: Let's Play School, Sesame Street: Oscar's Letter Party, The Muppet Show: Muppet Madness, The Muppet Show: You're The Director, and Disney Cartoon Arcade.

=== Author ===
In 1976, Freeman authored a book entitled Writing Resumes, Locating Jobs, and Handling Job Interviews. The book was originally published by Richard D Irwin, Publishers but was later bought out by McGraw Hill.

== Family ==
Freeman is married to Lois Sherfey and has five children and three grandchildren.
