= Super Dinosaur (TV series) =

Animated television series

- Series title card
- Genre: Action; Adventure; Science fantasy Comedy drama
- Based on: Super Dinosaur by: Robert Kirkman; Jason Howard
- Developed by: Kevin Burke; Chris "Doc" Wyatt
- Directed by: William Lau; Ken Cunningham
- Voices of: Valin Shinyei; Deven Mack; Alessandro Juliani; Marco Soriano; Kathleen Barr; Shannon Chan-Kent; Brian Drummond; Dean Redman; Brian Dobson; Diana Kaarina
- Theme music composer: Rich Walters
- Composer: Rich Walters
- Countries of origin: Canada; United States
- Original language: English
- No. of seasons: 1
- No. of episodes: 26

Production
- Executive producers: David Alpert; Robert Kirkman; Catherine Winder; Laura Clunie; Jennifer Dodge; Ronnen Harary; Kevin Burke; Chris "Doc" Wyatt
- Producer: Kylie Ellis
- Running time: 22 minutes
- Production companies: Spin Master Entertainment; Atomic Cartoons; Skybound Entertainment; Corus Entertainment

Original release
- Network: Teletoon (Canada)
- Release: September 8, 2018 – January 26, 2019

Super Dinosaur is a CG-animated television series produced by Spin Master Entertainment, Atomic Cartoons and Skybound Entertainment based on the comic book series of the same name by Robert Kirkman and Jason Howard. The show debuted on September 8, 2018 in Canada on Teletoon and in the United States on the Amazon Prime subscription streaming video service on October 6, 2019. It was subsequently added to Tubi and The Roku Channel.

== Characters ==
=== Heroes ===
- Derek Dynamo (voiced by Valin Shinyei) – The fun-loving, highly intelligent and energetic son of Dr. Dexter Dynamo. Alongside his father and best friend Super Dinosaur, Derek works for Earthcore, protecting the planet from various hazards. He rides around on Wheels, a robot he built.
- Super Dinosaur (voiced by Deven Mack) – A genetically-altered Tyrannosaurus rex created by Max Maximus, Super Dinosaur lives with the Dynamo family in the Dynamo Dome and is the best friend of Derek, who often refers to him as "SD". He is a vegetarian, and he loves to play video games and ride skateboards. In battle, he uses an interchangeable harness with robotic arms. He accidentally adopted a penguin as a pet on a mission.
- Dr. Dexter Dynamo (voiced by Alessandro Juliani) – Derek's father, a genius who helps create the gear his son and Super Dinosaur use on their missions. His cognitive abilities are diminished after Max Maximus poisons him with a mind-decaying virus though this was later reversed by an invention of Dr. Dynamo's old friend Dr. Oliver Manchester in the season 1 finale.
- The Kingstons – A family of mechanics sent to live in the Dynamo Dome by General Casey; responsible for building and repairing Derek and Super Dinosaur's combat equipment
  - Bruce Kingston (voiced by Brian Dobson) – The husband of Sarah, and father of Erin and Erica
  - Sarah Kingston (voiced by Kathleen Barr) – The wife of Bruce, and mother of Erin and Erica
  - Erin Kingston (voiced by Shannon Chan-Kent) – A charismatic and curious girl who makes quick friends with Derek upon the Kingston's arrival to the Dynamo Dome. She is fascinated by all the amazing technology created by Doctor Dynamo and Derek and responds to her family's move much more positively than her sister. Derek builds her Pixie, a robot similar to Wheels and joins Earthcore's cadet program.
  - Erica Kingston (voiced by Shannon Chan-Kent) – Annoyed about moving from Washington D.C., she is initially far less receptive to the Dynamos than her sister. She has a pet spider named Sherman. Unlike her sister, Erica cares little about Earthcore and is more drawn to the arts.
- General Casey (voiced by Dean Redman) – The Earthcore military administrator to the Dynamos and their super-heroic activities; oversees the majority of their funding, deployment into combat situations, and imprisonment of defeated super-villains at Earthcore Headquarters.
  - Elliot Casey (voiced by Tevon Herbert) – General Casey's son, who is around Derek's age; he is shown to be impulsive and pulls a dangerous prank on the Dynamo Dome to get his father's attention. He uses multiple aliases throughout the series (one of them being Battle Shock which includes using a giant mech) and eventually is allowed to join the Earthcore cadet training program. He later helps capture Terropterx, although he ends up being captured by him and partially transformed into a Dino-Men.

=== Villains ===
- Max Maximus (voiced by Marco Soriano) – An evil scientist who created Dynore, an incredibly powerful energy source. He seeks to destroy the Dynamos and take control of the world. He commands an army of genetically-engineered Dino-Men from his lair, Castle Maximus.
  - Minimus (voiced by Sean Thomas) – The artificial "son" of Maximus who was created via cloning, and initially pretended to be friendly to gain Derek's Trust under the alias of Tom Tillred. He became leader of the Dino-Men upon his "father's" incarceration, and later wrests control of the Sharkmen from Squidious. However close to the season 1 finale when Max Maximus returns to power he is transformed into a half human half dinosaur form named Tyrannosaurus X (voiced by Andrew Francis).
- Dino-Men (voiced by various) – Maximus' army of genetically-engineered human/dinosaur hybrids. While most are little more than subservient, dimwitted henchmen, there are a few who are highly intelligent, as detailed below.
  - Tricerachops (voiced by Kathleen Barr) – A female Triceratops who wields a battle-axe. She is Maximus' most favored servant and is shown to be more empathetic than other Dino-Men. After her morals are tested, she defects from Maximus' army and forms the Dino Liberation Front.
  - Dreadasaurus (voiced by Chris Nielsen) – A Stegosaurus with a shield that shoots spikes. Like Tricerachops, he defected from Maximus' army, and now serves under her in the Dino Liberation Front.
  - Terroropterx (voiced by Bart Batchelor) – A pterodactyl with shoulder-mounted weaponry and dual sabers. Like Tricerachops, he defected from Maximus' army, and now serves under her in the Dino Liberation Front. He attempted to get some mutated dinosaur DNA to create a new Dino-Men army but was captured by Earth Core. Although he later breaks out and takes Eliot Casey hostage
  - Doometrodon (voiced by Brian Drummond) – A Dimetrodon with a cybernetic right arm that can be used as a morning star as well as a blaster. Like Tricerachops, he defected from Maximus' army, and now serves under her in the Dino Liberation Front.
- Squidious (voiced by Brian Drummond) – A super-intelligent giant squid who is angered at humans' use of the sea's resources. He leads an army of Sharkmen to do his bidding to protect their underwater domain with his mobile base, a megalodon known as the Lair Leviathan. He later on becomes an ally to the heroes.
- KAL (voiced by Vincent Tong) – An Earthcore robot meant to assist Derek and Super Dinosaur on their missions. He views himself as a rival to Super Dinosaur for the status of Derek's best friend, often berating the rex by calling him "Average Dinosaur". On their first mission together, KAL becomes engulfed in lava, transforming him into the villainous Erupticus.
- Megaraptor – Maximus most powerful creation. A giant raptor with a giant fin-like blade on top of its head and a fish-like tail.

== Production ==
An animated adaptation of Super Dinosaur was first revealed by KidScreen on November 22, 2017, as a production between Spin Master Entertainment, Atomic Cartoons and Canadian broadcaster Corus Entertainment. The series was formally announced by Robert Kirkman at the Skybound Entertainment panel during the 2018 San Diego Comic-Con. At the company's fall 2018 upfronts, Corus confirmed that the show would air on Teletoon later that year. The series debuted on the channel on September 8.

Super Dinosaur is primarily a CG-animated series made with Autodesk Maya. The show also utilizes super deformed 2D-animation for cutaway gags and is presented in a letter boxed aspect ratio with matte break effects to emphasize action and comedy.

== Episodes ==
No.	Title	Directed by	Written by	Storyboarded by	Original release date	Prod. code
1	"My Best Friend is A Dinosaur"	William Lau	Kevin Burke & Chris "Doc" Wyatt	Louie Escauriaga; Jun Kumagai	September 8, 2018	101
Derek Dynamo and his best friend Super Dinosaur foil a plot by Max Maximus to take over the world by stealing the powerful Dynore energy source. The poor shape of the Dynamo's equipment (caused by Dr. Dynamo's failing mind) encourages Earthcore's General Casey to send help.
2	"Under the Dome"	William Lau; Ken Cunningham	Jacob Semahn	Louie Escauriaga; Jun Kumagai; Vincent Smith	September 9, 2018	102
On the behest of General Casey, the Kingston family moves into the Dynamo Dome, initially causing friction between Derek and his new housemates. Tricerachops breaks Terroropterx out of Earthcore's prison. Derek starts to warm up to the Kingstons after their expertise comes in useful during their fight with Tricerachops. They promise to keep Dr. Dynamo's declining mental abilities a secret.
3	"Rise of the Sharkmen"	William Lau	Sterling Gates	Sherwin Macario; Vincent Smith	September 15, 2018	103
At the Dynamo Dome, the Kingston's daughters Erica and Erin continue to squabble with Derek and Super Dinosaur, coming to a head in a disastrous dinner. General Casey sends Derek and Super Dinosaur to the arctic after an Earthcore research outpost is mysteriously attacked and the agents go missing. There they confront Squidious, a sentient squid king who, alongside his army of Sharkmen, kidnapped the Earthcore team due to mounting frustration with humanity's interference in the sea. After the mission is over, the Kingstons and Dynamos bond over dessert.
4	"Battle Shock"	William Lau; Ken Cunningham	Merrill Hagan	Jun Kumagai; Clinton Morris; Wei Li	September 16, 2018	104
Sarah and Bruce Kingston attend an Earthcore seminar, leaving the Dynamo Dome understaffed just as General Casey and a few agents begin to open the hatch to Inner Earth. The Dome is then suddenly attacked, knocking the power out, allowing a giant spider to escape from Inner Earth. Derek eventually unmasks the attacker as General Casey's son, Eliot. Derek, Super Dinosaur and Eliot are coached by Erica to peacefully lead the spider back into Inner Earth. When the dust is settled, General Casey scolds his son for doing such a dangerous stunt, but admits that maybe he hasn't given Eliot enough attention.
5	"Jurassic Golf"	William Lau	J.T. Krul	Sherwin Macario; Vincent Smith; Clinton Morris; Samantha Wheeldon	September 22, 2018	105
Derek and the Kingstons attempt to unwind by going mini-golfing, leaving Super Dinosaur feeling abandoned. Tricerachops seizes the opportunity by attempting to convince him to join her and the Dino Men, but fails once Max Maximus attacks.
6	"Temple of Secrets"	Ken Cunningham	Geoffrey Thorne	Jun Kumagai; Clinton Morris; Wei Li; Samantha Wheeldon	September 23, 2018	106
An Earthcore researcher secretly working for Max Maximus convinces General Casey to bring the Dynamos out to an ancient temple with a hidden entrance to Inner Earth. After the team narrowly avoids the temple's traps, Maximus attacks and reveals that he had infected Dr. Dynamo with a virus that is slowly eroding his mind. In Maximus' haste to enter Inner Earth, the temple's self destruct mechanism is activated, allowing Super Dinosaur to finally pull off an impossible skateboarding move he tried to master earlier.
7	"The Great Race"	William Lau	Kevin Burke & Chris "Doc" Wyatt	Sherwin Macario; Vincent Smith; Clinton Morris; Samantha Wheeldon	September 29, 2018	107
Noticing Erin's love for his robotic transportation companion Wheels, Derek builds one for her named Pixie. This prompts a race between the two around the Dynamo Dome, but their fun is cut short after Derek and Super Dinosaur are called onto a mission. Squidious has partnered with Max Maximus to gain access to Dynore. After ingesting the substance, Squidious grows to an enormous size, but unbeknownst to him, Maximus slowly gains control of his body. Erin accidentally joins Derek and Super Dinosaur on the mission. Squidious begs Derek for help, and together they're eventually able to break Maximus' mind control as well as return him to his normal size. While thankful for the assistance, Squidious warns that their truce will be short lived.
8	"BFF's"	Ken Cunningham	J.T. Krul	Clinton Morris; Samanth Wheeldon; Jun Kumagai; Wei Li	September 30, 2018	108
General Casey introduces KAL, a new robot assistant designed by Earthcore meant to help Super Dinosaur and Derek while on missions. While KAL's personality is grating, the extra hands couldn't have come at a better time, as Derek is forced to finish his final exam of the semester or face being removed from the Dynamo Dome. General Casey sends Super Dinosaur and KAL on a Volcano rescue mission. There, KAL's careless behaviour sees him become engulfed in lava, transforming him into the villainous Erupticus. With the aid of Erin and Erica, Derek is able to ditch the exam to help Super Dinosaur defeat Erupticus. Back at the Dynamo Dome, Derek's teacher, Ms. Finkle, discovers what's happened and originally fails him for skipping class. After Derek accepts responsibility for his actions and mentions how history helped him complete the mission, she changes her mind and gives him a barely passing grade. Back at the volcano site, Earthcore load up the remains of Erupticus, which triggers his face to turn on once again.
9	"Big Brother"	William Lau	Sterling Gates	Sherwin Macario; Vincent Smith; Clinton Morris	October 6, 2018	109
Dr. Dynamo sends a probe into Inner Earth to collect samples to research. When it returns, the crew of the Dynamo Dome are surprised as what had been thought to be three rocks, were instead three dinosaur eggs. After they hatch, Super Dinosaur takes an immediate shine to them and acts as their big brother, even housebreaking them and teaching them how to play basketball. Derek and Dexter break the news that they have to be sent back to Inner Earth. After they leave, Super Dinosaur sulks around with no one to play with. Suddenly, he finds the three baby dinosaurs rummaging around. They escaped from the probe before it entered Inner Earth and get grow in size after colliding into a canister of Dynore gas. The three dinosaurs mutate and start causing havoc around the Dynamo Dome, ruining equipment, and foiling Erica's hope of attending a school dance with her old friends. Derek, Dexter, Erin, and Erica fail to capture the three, but before making it outside the Dynamo Dome, Super Dinosaur manages to lure them with a basketball game, where they're finally caught. As they've been mutated, Dr. Dynamo states the three cannot return to Inner Earth. Instead, they will be sent to an Earthcore facility where they'll be researched and trained into one day joining the program. Super Dinosaur is given visitation access.
10	"Island of the Forgotten"	Ken Cunningham	Geoffrey Thorne	Jun Kumagai; Samantha Wheeldon; Wei Li	October 7, 2018	110
While on an Earthcore training exercise, Eliot Casey spots something strange. He tries to tell his superior officer, but is told to pack up as they're about to leave. Eliot decides to investigate on his own and finds Dino-Men with odd bumps on their bodies. Two of them ambush him and in the chase he notices his crew fly off. Fearing his father's wrath over disobeying orders, Eliot calls Derek and Super Dinosaur for help. Derek and Super Dinosaur arrive just in time to take out the Dino-Men chasing Eliot. Derek makes a mark in the ground to indicate where the Floor Door will open, as no one's at the Dynamo Dome to activate it so it's been set to a thirty-minute timer. As he ponders how the Dino-Men got on an island Earthcore made untraceable, one of Max Maximus' ships land directly onto the Floor Door marker. Tricerachops walks out, handing food and medicine to the three Dino-Men before they tell her they've encountered humans. As the two groups clash, another one of Maximus' ships arrives, this time featuring a crew of Dino-Men and a hologram from the man himself. He derides Tricerachops for not destroying the exiled Dino Men, who suffer from defects caused by the cloning process. Maximus demands the other Dino Men kill the "freaks." Tricerachops tries to get them to stop attacking. With the Dino-Men preoccupied, Derek, Super Dinosaur and Eliot try to devise a plan of escape. The Misfit Dino-Men appear, offering their assistance. The group create a distraction to attract Tricerachops and the other Dino-Men. They quickly realize they've been had and return to the landing zone, where they see the Misfits trying to clear the way for the Floor Door. The Dino-Men attack, with Derek and Super Dinosaur trying to fend them off. As the Floor Door opens, one of the Misfits gets hit and Eliot drags him through the portal to safety. Inspired, Tricerachops knocks out the rest of Maximus' Dino-Men, letting everyone escape. Back at the Dynamo Dome, General Casey congratulates his son for his work on the field. Earthcore allows the Misfits to go into Inner Earth. Elsewhere, Maximus attacks Tricerachops for not finishing the job. Her loyalty begins to falter.
11	"Dynore Quest"	Ken Cunningham	Merrill Hagan	Jun Kumagai; Jiin Park; Wei Li; Samantha Wheeldon	October 13, 2018	111
Erica receives an acceptance letter from a creative writing program Ms. Finkle had her apply to, but her parents are too busy working on a mission to notice. Max Maximus has devised a formula to create synthetic Dynore with the use of just three ancient elements. Derek and Super Dinosaur are sent off to retrieve the items before Maximus can. However, Tricerachops and the Dino Men are able to escape with the first two elements. For the third location, General Casey sends his son Eliot alongside the two. Together they're able to take back all three elements and head to the Dynamo Dome. With the mission complete, Erica finally tells her family the news. Citing safety issues, her parents say Erica can't go. Frustrated, she lowers the Dynamo Dome's firewalls, exposing its location to the outside world. Suddenly, a portal is opened right before them. Max Maximus and the Dino Men walk through.
12	"Invasion of the Dynamo Dome"	William Lau	Kevin Burke & Chris "Doc" Wyatt	Sherwin Macario; Vincent Smith; Clinton Morris	October 14, 2018	112
Maximus and the Dino-Men take control of the Dynamo Dome, locking all human attendants in a cell. Maximus proclaims that he no longer needs to create synthetic Dynore, given the Dynamo Dome's portal to Inner Earth. Super Dinosaur, who managed to escape in the earlier frenzy, is found out by Tricerachops and captured. Noticing her earlier hesitations, Maximus demands she use the opportunity to finally end Super Dinosaur to prove her loyalty. Tricerachops refuses to destroy a fellow dinosaur and instead commits a mutiny against Maximus alongside the other Dino-Men. She then pledges to take over the world alongside her family. Super Dinosaur's harness is removed and Maximus' arm is torn off before being thrown into the same cell as Derek and the rest of the crew. There, Super Dinosaur coughs up the key needed to exit. Maximus reveals a device of his that he can use to disable the Dynamo Dome's defense system, which have now been taken over by Tricerachops and the rest of the Dino-Men. General Casey, who broke his leg in the initial attack, is brought to the infirmary by Bruce Kingston. The remainder of the team head to the entrance of Inner Earth, which Tricerachops is attempting to open to allow dinosaurs to roam freely into Earth. The Dino-Men fend off the attackers, allowing the door to open. Derek and his father race to the control room to retrieve the three elements and devise a way to use them to close the door once again. Just as a pack of roaming dinosaurs are about to head through, Derek manages to close it. Tricerachops and Terroropterx gets teleported to an unknown location before killing Derek. General Casey arrives with Earthcore backup to arrest the rest of the Dino-Men. Maximus attempts to escape, but is stopped by Erica and Super Dinosaur. Later, Erica attempts to apologize to everyone for her behaviour. Her parents admit that they've neglected her since the move to the Dynamo Dome and pledge to find a way to get Erica into the writing program. Dr. Dynamo speaks to a locked up Maximus, who says only he can restore Dexter's memory and reveal the location of Dexter's previously unheard of wife.
13	"Minimum Requirements"	William Lau	Jacob Semahn	Sherwin Macario; Vincent Smith; Clinton Morris	October 20, 2018	113
Locked up in an Earthcore cell, Maximus taunts Dr. Dynamo with more information regarding his wife, Juliana. He brags about having erased any memory of her existence from the Dynamos and that while he may be locked up, his most powerful weapon is about to be activated. On the roof of the Dynamo Dome, Erica expresses guilt to Super Dinosaur over the Maximus invasion and plans on secluding herself. Derek and Super Dinosaur are sent on a mission to stop an Earthcore ship from being attacked by Dino-Men. They're easily defeated by the duo, allowing Derek to take a gun he believes to be the weapon Maximus was talking about. They only find one person on the Earthcore ship: a boy named Tom, who claims his mother was a scientist who vanished alongside the rest of the crew. Tom is brought back to the Earthcore base, where he is able to goad Derek into allowing him to visit the impound room where they store the weapons they've confiscated from Maximus. There, Tom reveals himself to in fact be Maximus' son created by cloning his DNA, Minimus, after grabbing his father's arm. Tom is able to free all of the captured Dino-Men but is stopped short of getting Maximus out by Dr. Dynamo, equipped with a more powerful version of the gun Derek seized earlier. Tom flees, becoming the new ruler of the Dino-Men. Back at the Dynamo Dome, Erica and the rest of the Kingstons set up an elaborate slam dunk trick to impress Derek and Super Dinosaur. Erica thanks Super Dinosaur for his earlier words of encouragement.
14	"The Legend of the Ghost Lizard"	Ken Cunningham	Sterling Gates	Clinton Morris; Becky Wedel; Vincent Smith; Samantha Wheeldon	October 21, 2018	114
After failing to respond to his distress call during a mission, Derek convinces his father and Super Dinosaur to head out for a camping trip to help clear Dr. Dynamo's mind. Before leaving, Erica warns Derek that the site they're going to is well known for paranormal activities. Derek dismisses it as the three went there years earlier with no issue. Just as they're about to go to sleep, their camp is attacked by a ghost-like creature. Derek and Dr. Dynamo devise a plan to capture it, but it backfires due to Super Dinosaur's fears, leaving them trapped in a cave. There, Dr. Dynamo discovers pictographic writing that details an ancient civilization from Inner Earth called the Reptiloids. They explored the top surface through gateways they built in temples spread across the planet, eventually retreating back to their home, viewing the outer level as a wasteland. The trio are once again attacked by the ghost lizard, but this time Derek disables it with a nearby control panel. They realize that it was a holographic defense mechanism created by the Reptiloids to protect an ancient relic. While Dr. Dynamo translates the glyphs on the object, Derek and Super Dinosaur battle against rock golems similar to those they fought in the hidden temple. Just as they're about to perish, Dexter activates the device, ending the threat. With oxygen running out and the cave starting to collapse, they narrowly escape. Back at the Dynamo Dome, Dexter confronts Maximus about Juliana. While camping, he discovered his wife's initials carved into a stone, confirming that it wasn't just a lie. Dr. Dynamo demands to know her whereabouts, but Maximus refuses to share any information.
15	"Storming the Castle"	William Lau	Gavin Hignight	Pierre-Alexandre Comtois; Vincent Smith; Sherwin Macario; Becky Wedel; Clinton Morris	October 27, 2018	115
Erin joins the Earthcore cadet program. Dr. Dynamo calls Derek from her going away celebration to tell him that he plans on infiltrating Castle Maximus to retrieve a storage device called the Infostar. There, Dr. Dynamo gets captured by Minimus. He calls the Dynamo Dome offering a trade: Maximus for Dr. Dynamo. Derek and Super Dinosaur manage to free Dr. Dynamo and escape. Back at the Dynamo Dome, Bruce and Sarah call unveil a virtual reality haptic sphere that'll allow Erica to attend her creative arts classes. Dr. Dynamo goes to the prison containing Maximus. Dexter gloats that he doesn't need his help to find Juliana, since he figures it will be on the Infostar. As Dynamo installs the Infostar, a video of Minimus appears, stating that he swapped the device for an infected copy in case this would happen. He attempts to use the access inside the Dynamo Dome to free his father, but ends up overloading the system, causing a greater explosion than he had intended. Maximus is left severely injured.
16	"Out of Our Depth"	Ken Cunningham	Peter Dicicco	Pierre-Alexandre Comtois; Becky Wedel; Vincent Smith; Samantha Wheeldon	October 28, 2018	116
After a failed attack on an underwater Earthcore research facility, Minimus replaces Squidious as the Shark Men's leader in the Lair Leviathan. Squidious is eventually apprehended by Earthcore and arrested. General Casey sends Derek and Super Dinosaur on a recon mission to locate the Lair Leviathan, as under Minimus' control it could be utilized to create great destruction. Derek and Super Dinosaur are outnumbered by Shark Men and abort the mission. Minimus realizes that with a nearby Dynore deposit he can transform the Lair into a weapon powerful enough to break the sea floor and enter Inner Earth. At the Dynamo Dome, Super Dinosaur and Derek have no other choice than to enlist Squidious in their assault on the Lair Leviathan. Fearing what Minimus will do to the ocean, Squidious agrees to help. Together, the three infiltrate the Lair Leviathan just before Minimus is able to transform it. Super Dinosaur, Derek and Squidious attempt to take over the control room, but Minimus tries to persuade him into joining his side. Squidious attacks Minimus and floods the Lair Leviathan, causing everyone to evacuate. With Minimus and the Shark Men defeated, Squidious keeps his end of the deal and goes back to prison, admitting that not all land dwellers are evil.
17	"The Floor Door Shuffle"	William Lau	Peter Dicicco	Sherwin Macario; Vincent Smith; Clinton Morris	November 3, 2018	117
Dr. Dynamo begins teaching Erica how to use the Floor Door. After coming back from a mission with explosive Dynore mutated centipedes, Super Dinosaur is mysteriously transported to a variety of locations. Dr. Dynamo and Erica realize he's going to locations he's recently visited with Derek. Dr. Dynamo fears if Super Dinosaur cycles through all destinations, he might vanish for good. One of the destinations Super Dinosaur is sent to is the surface of the Lair Leviathan. There, he notices that the Shark Men have excavated a Reptiloid artifact and are about to hand it over to Minimus. Derek is transported to the location and together they're able to retrieve it from the Shark Men. Super Dinosaur is sucked through a Floor Door once again, arriving at the abandoned mine shaft Maximus previously used as a base. Thanks to Erica, Dr. Dynamo is able to discover the source of Super Dinosaur's problems. By accidentally ingesting the goo of some of the mutated centipedes, his energy signature was severely interfered. They're able to devise a plan that requires Super Dinosaur to use one of his rockets to force the Floor Door to reset its location log. Thinking their hideout has been ambushed, a nearby Tricerachops and Doometrodon attack. In the struggle, Super Dinosaur uses his last rocket to stop Doometrodon from hurting Derek. The Floor Door opens again, slowly dragging Super Dinosaur in. Derek takes the Reptiloid artifact and taunts Tricerachops into making it explode, successfully sending Super Dinosaur back to the Dynamo Dome.
18	"Multi-Player"	William Lau	Sterling Gates	Vincent Smith; Clinton Morris; Sherwin Macario	November 4, 2018	118
Tricerachops hijacks General Casey's ship and holds him hostage with the hope of freeing the other Dino Men. Derek and Super Dinosaur fend her off, telling her that Minimus had already freed them. Disobeying advice from the Kingstons, Derek is able to stop the ship from exploding. Bruce and Sarah notes his reckless behavior, wondering if it's due to Dr. Dynamo spending so much time with Maximus. Back at the Dynamo Dome, as a birthday present for Super Dinosaur, Derek modifies the Earthcore virtual reality training system to display Super Force Team Awesome, the duo's favorite video game. To get the game to run, he has to disable all safety protocols. Alongside Erica, the three jump into the game and quickly get hurt, realizing that they are experiencing physical pain. Wheels gets stomped by a cyclops and sustains significant damage. Erica tries to exit the game, but realizes she can't because of the safety protocols being shut off. Derek believes they can exit the game if they reach a save point, which on this level requires beating a stage boss named Croco-Gator before the timer runs out. Bruce and Sarah notice how quiet the Dynamo Dome is and investigate. They spot them in the training room and try to get them out, but can't. In the real world, Bruce and Sarah take control of the three and are able to beat Croco-Gator with a cheat code. Derek admits his callous behavior needlessly puts people in danger. Wheels gets repaired and everyone celebrate Super Dinosaur's birthday together.
19	"The Labyrinth of the Leviathans"	Ken Cunningham	Jason Howard	Pierre-Alexandre Comtois; Becky Wedel; Vincent Smith; Samantha Wheeldon	November 10, 2018	119
At a beach, Derek and Super Dinosaur confront a group of Shark Men wielding a powerful, unknown scepter. After fending them off, the two request help from Squidious, who warns that the creator of the weapons is beyond the power of land dwellers. After being denied exit, Squidious escapes from Earthcore lockup, taking a container of Dynore with him. General Casey sends Derek and Super Dinosaur after him, where they discover an underwater labyrinth. A clan of Hammer Head Shark Men attack with the same scepter and in the conflict Derek and Super Dinosaur accidentally open an entrance into the labyrinth. Through the maze, they're able to catch up to Squidious, who saves them from a group of leeches. Squidious reveals that they're in a sanctuary devoted to the Queen Leviathan, a massive, evil force who birthed the ship he commands. To keep her slumbering, Squidious must continue feeding her Dynore. Squidious suspects his Shark Men led Minimus there to steal her Dynore reserves. A Hammer Head Shark Man attacks, destroying the Dynore Squidious brought. Super Dinosaur uses the last of his suit's energy to feed the Queen and keep her asleep. At Earthcore headquarters, General Casey apologizes for misjudging Squidious. Squidious pledges to return to his prison, but Casey decides it's best he heads to the Dynamo Dome to assist Derek and Super Dinosaur when needed.
20	"Graduation Day"	William Lau	Merrill Hagan	Jun Kumagai; Vincent Smith; Clinton Morris	November 11, 2018	120
Erin completes the Earthcore cadet training program with a record setting run, upsetting Derek as he set the prior record. To clear the air and test out some new items created by the Kingstons (including a vehicular upgrade for Wheels), Erin and Derek take on another training program. Instead, they bicker some more. After being startled by Squidious, Erin checks in on her sister, who gets annoyed by Erin's critique of her Floor Door abilities. While doing her daily look out, Erin spots seismic activity and a Dynore deposit in New Mexico. With the adults asleep, she tries to alert Derek and Super Dinosaur, but Derek shrugs her off, feeling that if it was important General Casey would've called them. Erin decides to go on the mission with Pixie, where they're immediately attacked by a giant mutated centipede. She notices that it's following sound and is able to incapacitate it. At the Dynamo Dome, Erica tries to apologize for earlier but finds out that her sister is gone. She wakes up Derek and Super Dinosaur and they transport to the location. In typical fashion, they come in loud, causing more centipedes to wake up and attack. After initially struggling to work as a team, the three are able to defeat the centipedes. Derek puts Erin in charge of the rest of the mission, who spots a giant Dynore stash somewhere. The trio head to a spot in the desert just as it breaks open, revealing a mutated scorpion named Scorpinox. The monster devours Dynore and is the cause for the mutated centipedes. Erin panics, but Derek is there to tell Super Dinosaur to destroy his Dynore collection. Erica calls in, telling Super Dinosaur and Derek about a new combination ability that their parents built into Wheels. They're able to get Scorpinox to fall into a pit, where he passes out. Derek says he expects them to go back to normal after losing their Dynore exposure, but says they should tell Earthcore anyway. Back at the Dynamo Dome, Erica and Derek apologize to Erin, and Derek accepts responsibility for letting Erin go on the mission alone.
21	"The Return of Erupticus"	Ken Cunningham	Gavin Hignight	Jun Kamagai; Becky Wedel; Jiin Park; Samantha Wheeldon	November 17, 2018	121
22	"Mind Over Mammal"	Ken Cunningham	Adam Jay Epstein	Pierre-Alexandre Comtois; Becky Wedel; Jun Kumagai; Samantha Wheeldon; Vincent Smith	November 18, 2018	122
23	"The Dino Liberation Front"	William Lau	Merrill Hagan	Jun Kumagai; Chuek Po; Clinton Morris; Samantha Wheeldon	November 24, 2018	123
24	"Breakout"	Ken Cunningham	Jason Howard	Jun Kumagai; Vincent Smith; Clinton Morris; Becky Wedel; Cheuk Po; Samantha Wheeldon	January 12, 2019	124
25	"The Rogue Ones"	William Lau	Kevin Burke & Chris "Doc" Wyatt	Jun Kumagai; Cheuk Po; Clinton Morris; Samantha Wheeldon	January 19, 2019	125
26	"Super Dinosaur's Last Stand"	Ken Cunningham; William Lau	Kevin Burke & Chris "Doc" Wyatt	Jun Kumagai; Vincent Smith; Clinton Morris; Becky Wedel; Cheuk Po; Samantha Wheeldon	January 26, 2019	126

== Mobile game ==
On October 24, 2018, Canadian mobile development studio Big Blue Bubble released Super Dinosaur: Kickin' Tail, a battle game featuring characters and locations from the TV series. It was first soft launched in Canada as a free-to-play title for iOS and Android devices.

== International broadcast ==
The series debuted in Australia on ABC Me on May 18, 2019. In New Zealand, it began airing on TVNZ 2 on June 22, 2019. In the United States, the series was released on Amazon Prime Video on October 6, 2019. It was later added to Tubi TV in February 2020.
