= Cards Against Humanity =

American adult party game

- Designers: Josh Dillon; Daniel Dranove; Eli Halpern; Ben Hantoot; David Munk; David Pinsof; Max Temkin; Eliot Weinstein
- Publisher: Cards Against Humanity LLC
- Release date: May 2011; 15 years ago
- Players: 2 – 20+
- Age range: 17+
- Cards: 550 (1.0), 600 (2.0) (Note: Version 2.0 of Cards Against Humanity expanded the base set to 600 cards.) (base set)
- Deck: Dedicated
- Playing time: 30 min – 90 min

Related games
- What Do You Meme? Bad People; That's What She Said; Superfight
- Website: cardsagainsthumanity.com

Cards Against Humanity is an American adult card-based party game in which players complete fill-in-the-blank statements, using words or phrases typically deemed offensive, risqué, or politically incorrect, printed on playing cards. It has been compared to the card game Apples to Apples (1999).

The game originated with a Kickstarter campaign in 2011. The game's title refers to the phrase "crimes against humanity", reflecting its politically incorrect content.

== Development ==
Cards Against Humanity was created by a group of eight Highland Park High School alumni. Heavily influenced by the popular Apples to Apples card game, it was initially named Cardenfreude (a pun on the German concept Schadenfreude) and involved a group of players writing out the most abstract and, often, humorous response to the topic question. The name was later changed to Cards Against Humanity, with the answers pre-written on the white cards known today. Co-creator Ben Hantoot cited experiences with various games such as Magic: The Gathering, Balderdash, and charades as inspiration, also noting that Mad Libs was "the most direct influence" for the game.

The game was financed with a Kickstarter crowdfunding campaign and influenced by a previous crowd-funded campaign for a book on the design of Barack Obama's 2008 presidential campaign. The campaign started on December 1, 2010; it met its goal of US$4,000 (equivalent to $5,906 in 2025) in two weeks. The campaign ended on January 30, 2011, and raised over $15,000 (equivalent to $22,146 in 2025), just over 400% of its original goal. With this additional money raised towards the game, the creators added fifty more cards to the game itself.

== Gameplay ==
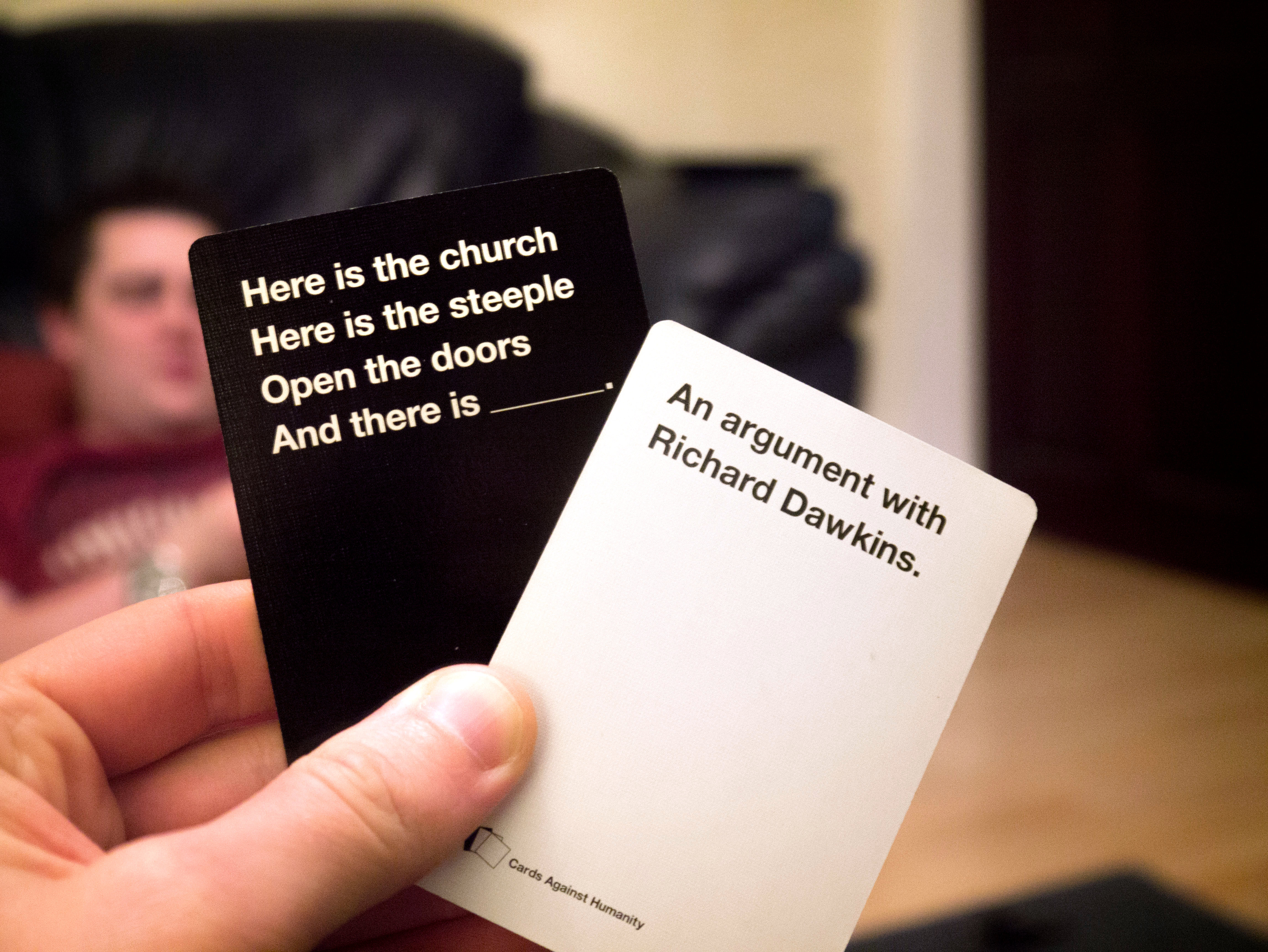
A black "question" card and a white "answer" card.

To start the game, each player draws 10 white cards.

According to the rule book provided with the game, the person who most recently defecated (a primitive form of randomization) begins as the "Card Czar" (or "Card Tsar") and plays a black card, face up. The Card Czar then reads the question or fill-in-the-blanks phrase on the black card out loud.

The other players answer the question or fill in the blanks by each passing one white card (or however many required by the black card), face down, to the Card Czar.

The Card Czar shuffles all of the answers and shares each card combination with the group. For full effect, the Card Czar should usually re-read the black card before presenting each answer. The Card Czar then picks the funniest play, and whoever submitted it gets one "Awesome Point". After the round, a new player becomes the Card Czar, and everyone draws back up to 10 white cards.

The part of speech of a white card is a noun or gerund, including both single words and phrase constructions. Black cards are either fill-in-the-blank statements or questions. Both white and black cards break these rules on rare occasions.

The rules do not state how to win the game, but a popular way to win for most players is whoever has the most black cards or points at the end of the game (black cards are obtained by whoever is funniest at the end of a round). Another way to end off the session of Cards Against Humanity is to end off with the Haiku card since it can help get rid of the "bad" white cards.

The rules in Cards Against Humanity are flexible and can be altered with the many house rules (which are listed in the rules) that players can incorporate (e.g. winning cards are chosen democratically, ability to trade points for cards, points given by ranks, etc.). The official rules include additional provisions for gambling previously won "Awesome Points" for the right to play additional white cards during a round.

== Release and sales ==
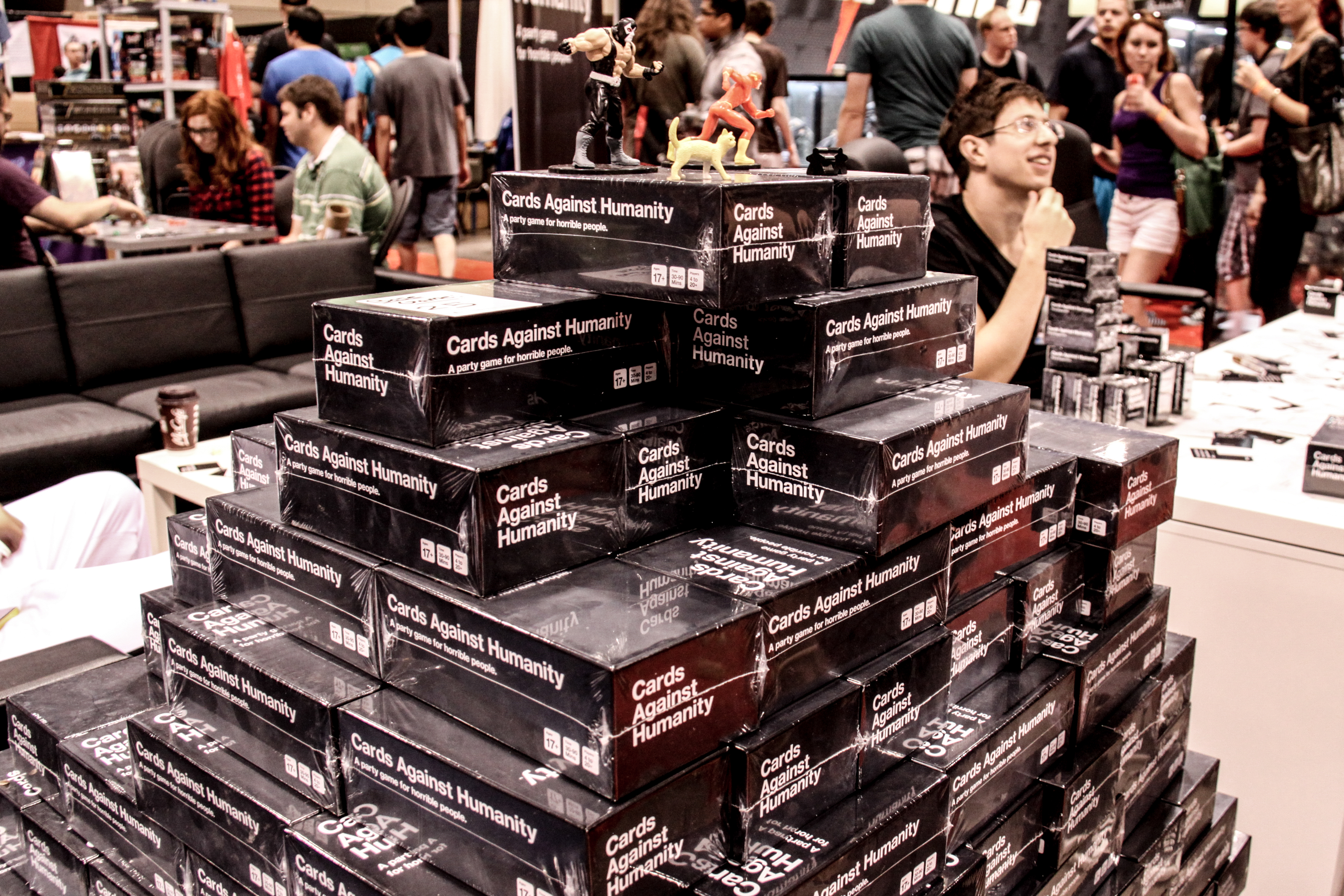
A stack of Cards Against Humanity boxes at Fan Expo Canada (2013).

After six months of development, Cards Against Humanity was officially released in May 2011. A month later, it became the number one game on Amazon. Since its release, the game has gradually become more popular and has seen a rise of sales throughout the years. The Chicago Sun-Times estimated that CAH earned at least $12 million in profit, and according to the company, customers have downloaded the PDF file 1.5 million times in the year since they began tracking the numbers.

In October 2011, the game was exhibited as part of the "Big Games" area of the annual IndieCade games festival in Culver City, where the release of a first expansion was announced. In November 2011, the expansion was released. It sold out in three days. The first expansion contained 100 new cards and 12 blank cards.

The base game cards are licensed under CC-BY-NC-SA 2.0 license and can be downloaded at their website.

=== Black Friday promotions ===
Since 2013, the creators of Cards Against Humanity have held satirical promotions on Black Friday. In 2013, an "anti-sale" was held in which the game's cost was raised by $5. Despite its higher price, the game maintained its best-selling status on Amazon and experienced a minor spike in sales during that period.

In 2014, to "help you experience the ultimate savings on Cards Against Humanity", the game and its expansions were removed from the online store and replaced by "Bullshit" boxes containing sterilized bull feces, sold at $6 each. Over 30,000 boxes were sold.

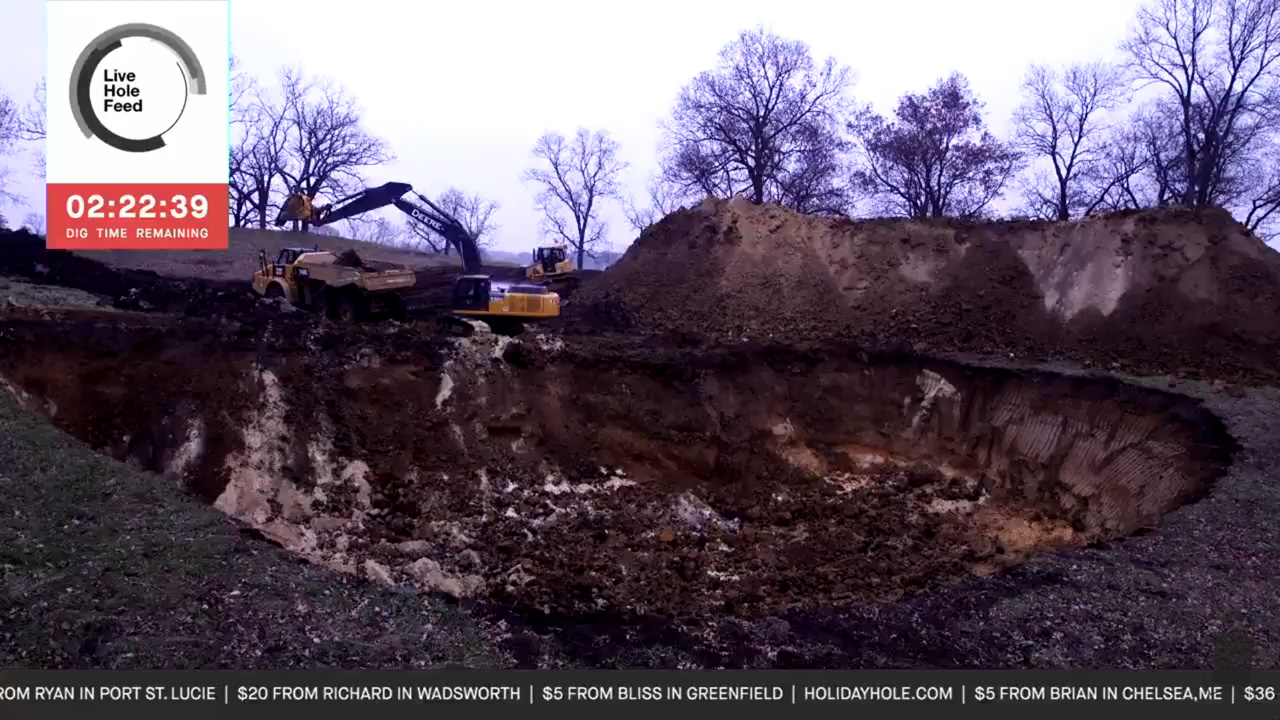
The 2016 Holiday Hole being dug.

In 2015, the game's online store was replaced by an order form with an offer to "Give Cards Against Humanity $5" and receive nothing in return. The offer was justified by claiming that "the greatest Black Friday gift of all is buying nothing. We're offering that for the rock-bottom price of $5. How can you afford NOT to seize this incredible opportunity?", and that what the money would be used for would be announced "soon". 11,248 customers spent $71,145 on the offer during the campaign. The money was divided equally among the Cards Against Humanity team members, who were asked to report back what they spent their money on. Many of them made donations to charities.

For 2016, the creators began to live stream the excavation of a "Holiday Hole", located in Oregon, Illinois, and stated that they would continue to dig the hole as long as they continue to receive donations. The creators did not state any reason for the hole nor any planned use of the money and explicitly ruled out charity in a FAQ by asking the reader, "Why aren't YOU giving all this money to charity? It's your money." $100,573 was collected. Later in the week, the hole was filled back in and reseeded.

Prior to Black Friday in 2017, a brand of potato chips known as "Original Prongles" (a parody of Pringles) were spotted in multiple Target stores, with packaging featuring a pig mascot and the slogan "Once You Pop... That's Great!". On Black Friday, the Cards Against Humanity website was redirected to OriginalProngles.com, which announced that the creators of Cards Against Humanity had exited the gaming industry in favor of snack food, with a commitment to "bold flavors and bold thinking". In a FoxNews.com interview, Max Temkin and Josh Dillon (who referred to themselves as Prongles' "chief flavor officers") stated that Prongles and its pig mascot were inspired by US president Donald Trump, adding that "if you love President Donald J. Trump, we guarantee you will love the tangy onion and thick cream flavors of Original Prongles. That's why we promise to Make America CRUNCH Again™! [sic]"

In 2018, the creators held a "99 Percent Off Sale", selling random items (such as a used 2015 Ford Fiesta, medieval weapons, and even cash) for 99% off, with a new item every 10 minutes. The creators stated that the promotion was "100% real and possibly a very bad idea."

In 2019, the creators held Black Friday A.I. Challenge, pitting the company's writers against a machine learning algorithm, producing two themed card packs: the Human Pack and the A.I. Pack. If the Human Pack sold more, the writers would get a $5,000 bonus and if the A.I. won, the writers would be fired. The Human Pack ultimately sold over $1,000 more than the A.I. Pack.

For 2020, in lieu of doing a prank, Cards Against Humanity donated the $250,000 set aside for a Black Friday promotion to five charities: the Equal Justice Initiative, the New Georgia Project, National Low Income Housing Coalition, Brave Space Alliance, and the Laughing At My Nightmare COVID-19 Relief Fund.

In 2021, the creators held a "Cards Against Humanity Pays You $5 Sale", in which the creators would pay $5 and up to site visitors for doing various tasks, ranging from asking Hellmann's to bring back "Clam-O-Naise", to donating teeth, to helping the creators figure out what program they saw Patrick Fischler in (Nash Bridges). Some tasks, like getting the COVID-19 vaccine that day, would reward $100, while other tasks, like guessing how many jelly beans have been put inside a 1993 Cadillac Allanté, would reward $10,000 to one person.

In 2022, Cards Against Humanity launched a new storage box, known as "Bōks", by kicking off a 200% off sale at 3:00 P.M. EST on Black Friday. To receive a discount code, a user would have to solve multiple increasingly complex CAPTCHAs, including identifying tanks (military tanks, fish tanks, Shark Tank, tank tops, etc.), identifying "assholes" (including actual animal anuses as well as public figures like Elon Musk), and answering who rightfully won the 2020 U.S. Presidential Election. With each individual code given out, the discount would decrease by .01%. Other items, including an "Ultimate Expansion" version of Bōks filled with almost 2,000 cards and a miniature version of the base game, were released.

In 2023, the company launched Yowza!, a parody of Twitter/X advertising itself as a social network with "no hate, lies, or crypto enthusiasts." No matter what the user types or attempts to upload, the only thing that comes out is the word "yowza". The site rewarded the first 10,000 people to refer another user $4.20. The 2,500 users with the most referrals by the end of Black Friday won a free copy of the board game Head Trip, while the top 420 would win $69, and the user with the most referrals, @spark, won $69,420. The site offers Yowza Black, a paid service that allows a user to post "awooga", and a store to buy followers, likes, ringtones, the ability to say "shazam", and more.

In 2024, the creators sold Diamond Potato, a potato decorated with real VVS-clarity lab-grown diamonds valued at over $1,000, for $69.99. Thousands of diamond potatoes were offered, selling out in less than 30 minutes.

In 2025, Cards Against Humanity held another "99 Percent Off Sale".

=== Expansions and additional products ===
The base set of Cards Against Humanity came initially with 550 cards, though this has increased to 600 as of version 2.0's release in 2017. Six 100-card expansions were made over the years, before being repackaged into two 300-card expansions, known as the "Red Box" and "Blue Box", in 2016. More 300-card boxes have been released since then, such as the "Green Box", "Absurd Box", and "Everything Box". Various themed card packs, usually with around 30 cards, have also been released, with some as limited time releases. Various international versions have released, as well.

A storage box, known as "The Bigger, Blacker Box", was released in 2013. As more cards came in, the company released an even larger box in 2016, along with a 69-inch (180 cm) box, entitled "Please do not buy this product.", that was hidden on the store page. The original storage box contained a special card hidden inside the packaging, entitled "The biggest, blackest dick.", with silver letters. The expanded release contained more hidden cards, along with unique algorithmically generated cards. Both products were discontinued by 2021, with "Bōks" replacing them in 2022.

On July 28, 2015, Cards Against Humanity announced a design-themed expansion pack, featuring 30 cards that were created by famous designers riffing on comedian George Carlin's "seven dirty words". All proceeds were donated to the Chicago Design Museum.

In July 2017, a special edition of the base game, Cards Against Humanity For Her, was unveiled, in support of EMILY's List—a PAC that aims to help elect female pro-choice Democratic candidates to office. As a satire of the "pink tax", it is exactly the same as the normal base set, except it has a pink-colored box and is US$5 more expensive.

In 2020, Cards Against Humanity announced a new version of the game for families: Cards Against Humanity: Family Edition. Initially released as a free printable version in April 2020, the game eventually released as a 600 card base set later in the year. The game was developed in consultation with child development experts and psychologists, and was intended for ages 8 and up. Expansions have been released for the Family Edition, including a 300 card "Glow in the Dark Box" and a 30 card "Written By Kids Pack".

In 2022, Cards Against Humanity announced the release of "Clam-O-Naise", a clam-flavored mayonnaise sold only at Target, referencing one of the campaigns from their 2021 Black Friday prank. A 30-card "Clam Pack" was packaged inside the mayo, along with a code to redeem unique prizes, including Clam-O-Naise merch, vacations, and a Toyota Clamry.

In 2024, Cards Against Humanity announced the release of "The Pussy Pack", a 30-card expansion set in collaboration with Noelle of @bap.kat, the viral Siamese cat who gained a following playing Cards Against Humanity. The pack was encased in a fur pouch that contained 30 new white cards chosen by Noelle, along with a catnip-stuffed cat toy that emulated the game's white cards. Additionally, the pack featured a clear, heart-shaped locket to display a tuft of bap.kat's fur, which came included in each pack.

=== Political involvement and the Nuisance Committee ===
In August 2016, Cards Against Humanity released two "America Votes" packs for the two presidential candidates: Vote for Hillary Pack and Vote for Trump Pack. Each pack contains 15 cards of jokes about the candidate. Designer Max Temkin said that the proceeds for both packs would go to the Clinton campaign regardless. The group began posting billboards under a political action committee (PAC) called the Nuisance Committee. Temkin named the PAC in honor of his grandfather, a Jewish prisoner of war in World War II who formed a "nuisance committee" to try to annoy their Nazi captors without getting killed. In September, the group advertised on a billboard in Chicago with the words: "If Trump is so rich, how come he didn't buy this billboard?" In October 2016, the Nuisance Committee posted a billboard in Dearborn, Michigan which was printed in Arabic text on a black background, reading "Donald Trump can't read this, but he is scared of it". An Overwatch-themed anti-Trump billboard was also posted in Orlando, Florida.

In mid-November 2017, the creators announced a campaign, Cards Against Humanity Saves America, in protest of the Trump administration and Donald Trump's proposed U.S.-Mexico border wall, arguing: "[Trump is] a preposterous golem who is afraid of anything. He is so afraid that he wants to build a $20 billion wall that everyone knows will accomplish nothing." The creators also purchased vacant land along the border and "retained a law firm specializing in eminent domain to make it as time-consuming and expensive as possible for the wall to get built". It was also announced that those who made a $15 donation for the campaign would receive six "surprises" throughout December, including additional cards and a map of the aforementioned land plot. One of the surprises was the redistribution of the money paid, including 10,000 refunds, and issuing $1,000 checks to 100 donors they determined to be the most in need.

In the lead-up to the 2018 midterm elections, the Nuisance Committee posted billboards against incumbent Illinois representative Peter Roskam. The company also released a Midterm Pack in support of Run for Something; the pack cost $5, but could be received for free if the customer provided the address of a registered voter in one of six swing districts (who would also receive a copy of the pack for free).

In August 2022, it was announced that revenue from all purchases of the game and its expansions by residents of U.S. states that have or are "likely" to restrict abortion rights would be donated to the National Network of Abortion Funds.

In September 2024, Cards Against Humanity announced a lawsuit against SpaceX, alleging that the company had left equipment and materials on the plot of land Cards Against Humanity purchased in 2017 along the U.S.-Mexico border. Cards Against Humanity alleged that SpaceX never asked for permission to use the site, and sought $15 million in damages for the alleged unlawful use of the land. If the lawsuit succeeded, Cards Against Humanity pledged to give back all of the net proceeds to each of their 150,000 original subscribers. The lawsuit was settled out of court in late 2025.

== Reception ==
The game was praised as "Simple, yet well-executed" by the Chicago Tribune "Puzzler", "pretty amazing" by The A.V. Club, and "the game your party deserves" by Thrillist. However, in December 2015, the game received a rating of 6.48/10 in reviews on BoardGameGeek. The score earned it a ranking of 146 in party games.

Reviews note the similarity between Cards Against Humanity and the 1999 family card game Apples to Apples. The A.V. Club interview calls the game "a sort of Apples to Apples for the crass and jaded." Criticism of the game stems from its enjoyment primarily depending on the number of players participating as well as many reviewers' concern that its politically incorrect content may offend certain audiences.

In a letter of complaint to The New York Times Magazine, writer Dan Brooks argued:

Like America's most successful brands, Cards Against Humanity positions itself against the masses, when in fact it is mass taste distilled. It is the product of a culture in which transgressing social norms has become an agreed-on social norm ... Cards Against Humanity isn't really transgressive at all. It is a game of naughty giggling for people who think the phrase "black people" is inherently funny ... The awful thing is that it works. The reliability of Cards Against Humanity as an activity most people will enjoy only makes it more depressing to those of us immune to its charms. It is, in the end, a party game for horrible people. But who else is there to party with?

Brooks' editorial received attention from media sources such as The A.V. Club and PJ Media.

== Criticism ==
In 2014, a 19-year-old transgender man from Boston posted a photo of a burning game card, featuring the text "Passable transvestites." After the post quickly spread, game creator Max Temkin apologized: "I regret writing this card, it was a mean cheap joke. We took it out a while ago."

A 2016 analysis of the game showed a strong racial bias in the cards. One-fifth of the original card deck included answers involving race. Of those cards, only 11 percent of cards mentioning white people were racially charged compared to 60 percent of cards mentioning black or Hispanic people, 80 percent of cards mentioning Asian people, and 100 percent of cards mentioning Native American people. Cards were coded as "racially charged" if they spoke to a historical or contemporary oppressive event or stereotype; some examples of actual cards from the deck included "The Trail of Tears", "The hard working Mexican", and "Helplessly giggling at the mention of Hutus and Tutsis".

The game has also been criticized for its use of misogyny, rape, and child abuse for humor. Cards such as "Child abuse," "This year's mass shooting," and "Holding down a child and farting all over him" remain in the original deck of the game. Jokes involving rape were pointed out early in the game's history and were subsequently removed, but "Surprise sex!," "Copping a feel," and "Coathanger abortions" remain in the game.

In 2020, designer and co-founder Max Temkin left the company after accusations surfaced on social media accusing him of creating a sexist and racist work culture at Cards Against Humanity. Other co-founders confirmed that this behavior had been present, and complained about for several years, and resulted in the reduction of Temkin's managerial duties over time. In an apology, the company stated:

As Cards Against Humanity rapidly grew from a hobby project in our parents' basements to a company with 18 full-time employees, we made a lot of mistakes. We want to apologize to employees who were unheard or disrespected in our office. We are truly sorry. We also want to state unequivocally that we condemn harassment of anyone who has posted stories about their experiences at Cards Against Humanity.

== See also ==
- Apples to Apples – a similar game that influenced Cards Against Humanity
- Dixit
- Hawaii 2 – an island in Maine bought by Cards Against Humanity LLC in 2014
- Joking Hazard
- Under the Gun Theater § Past productions
- What Do You Meme?
- Magic Puzzle Company – founded by Cards Against Humanity cofounders Max Temkin and Ben Hantoot

== Bibliography ==
- Walker, Rob (September 1, 2016). "Cards Against Humanity Has Been a Huge Win for This Small Printing Company". Bloomberg.com.
