= Theory11 =

American producer of playing cards

theory11
- Type: Private
- Industry: Playing card manufacturer
- Founded: August 31, 2007; 19 years ago
- Founders: Jonathan Bayme
- Headquarters: Charleston, South Carolina, United States
- Products: Playing cards, magic tricks, puzzles
- Website: www.theory11.com

theory11 is an American producer of playing cards, magic tricks, and puzzles. It was founded in Charleston, South Carolina by Jonathan Bayme.

== Products ==
In 2019, theory11 collaborated with English illusionist Derren Brown on a deck of cards that are sold on the company's website.

In October 2020, theory11 produced a single-player board game named Box One in collaboration with Neil Patrick Harris.

In May 2021, they collaborated with Whitney Museum of American Art and British artist Shantell Martin on a deck of cards, released in two different colors.

In December 2024, they released a Harry Potter-themed jigsaw puzzle.

In April 2025, theory11 collaborated with The Beatles on a deck of cards themed on the band released in four different colors.

In November 2026, theory11 was acquired by Relatable, a game and entertainment company originally known as What Do You Meme?. They stated that they would keep theory11's team, operations, and creative vision intact.
