= Jerry Media =

Instagram account

Jerry Media is a content and advertising company that operates various Instagram accounts, most prominently @fuckjerry. The account, founded by Elliot Tebele in 2011, is known for its aggregation of online content and internet memes. The account's popularity led Tebele to found Jerry Media which later became known for its promotion of the Fyre Festival. Later, Jerry Media co-produced Fyre, a documentary about the failed music festival. Jerry Media is involved with Jerry News, JaJa Tequila, and the card game What Do You Meme.

== History ==
Tebele started the @fuckjerry account on Tumblr in 2011, and he originally posted photos of vintage cars. The name is inspired by Seinfeld. "I was just watching Seinfeld, trying think of a name for a Tumblr and somehow I came up with it," Tebele said. Tebele is from Brooklyn and dropped out of college.

He later expanded to Instagram and eventually formed Jerry Media along with co-founders Elie Ballas, Ben Kaplan, Mick Purzycki, and James Ohliger.

== Operations ==
Jerry Media operates a network of accounts besides @fuckjerry. The New York Times wrote in 2020 that "the company's portfolio includes some of the most notable meme accounts on Instagram." One of Jerry Media's accounts is @beigecardigan, which was started by @fuckjerry founder Elliot Tebele's wife, personal stylist Jessica Tebele. She started the account after seeing Elliot's success with @fuckjerry, and she describes her account as "more of a woman's sense of humor" and "actually more badass than FuckJerry." Jerry Media operates Dude With Sign, an Instagram account with photos of Seth Phillips holding cardboard messages with satirical protests.

As of early 2019, Jerry Media worked in an "unofficial capacity" with the Instagram egg. Jerry Media uses its following on Instagram to promote sponsors' brands. As of early 2019, each sponsored post earns the firm $30,000.

== Controversies ==
=== Fyre Festival ===
Jerry Media promoted the failed Fyre Festival on its social media accounts. Along with Vice, it co-produced Fyre, a documentary about the festival that was released worldwide via Netflix on January 18, 2019, four days after Hulu released Fyre Fraud. While the Netflix documentary places blame for the failures on Billy McFarland, Hulu's documentary said that Jerry Media suppressed concerns that attendees had before the festival. Jerry Media deleted critical Instagram comments and blocked the users posting them.

=== Accusations of stealing memes ===
In 2019, the #FuckFuckJerry hashtag emerged. Comedians accused @fuckjerry of using their Twitter posts in ads for the Jerry Media card game What Do You Meme. Various public figures, including Amy Schumer, Patton Oswalt, and Whitney Cummings encouraged their followers to unfollow @fuckjerry. John Mulaney wrote in an Instagram caption "they have stolen jokes from me and many other comedians and profit off it." Comedy Central pulled advertising from Jerry Media after there was an acknowledgment that they stole content and did not include any attribution to the original creators of the content. In reference to @fuckjerry's reliance on other people's jokes, New York Magazine wrote that "account is so unoriginal that its aesthetic is literally that of a '90s-era Dixie Cup." In a February 2019 statement, FuckJerry said it would change its practices and ask for permission from the creators before posting any content.

=== Promoting Bloomberg 2020 campaign ===
In 2020, Jerry Media was hired to produce original content for the Michael Bloomberg 2020 presidential campaign, specifically for Instagram and Twitter. The company was then criticized for flooding social media platforms with pro-Bloomberg memes and other content.
