= Skybound Entertainment =

American multi-platform entertainment company

- Industry: Entertainment
- Founded: 2010; 16 years ago
- Founder: Robert Kirkman; David Alpert
- Headquarters: Beverly Hills, California, United States
- Key people: Robert Kirkman (chairman); David Alpert (CEO); Catherine Winder (CEO, Skybound North); Jon Goldman (Managing Partner)
- Products: Comic books; Video games; Books; Television series; Feature films
- Owner: Robert Kirkman, LLC
- Divisions: Skybound Animation; Skybound Books (joint venture with Atria Publishing Group); Skybound Galactic; Skybound Games; Skybound Insiders; Skybound Japan; Skybound North; Skybound Stories (joint venture with Sky Group)
- Subsidiaries: 5th Planet Games; GammaRay; Sagafilm EHF (joint venture with 5th Planet Games and BetaFilm Nordics, acquisition pending); Spike and Mike's Festival of Animation
- Website: www.skybound.com

Skybound Entertainment is an American multiplatform entertainment company founded by Robert Kirkman and David Alpert. It operates in concert with Image Comics.

== History ==
Skybound Entertainment is the company behind the long-running comic series, The Walking Dead, created by Robert Kirkman, as well as the properties Invincible, Impact Winter, Stillwater, and the Energon Universe line of comics. Since the company’s founding in 2010, Skybound has developed properties in traditional and new media, including comics, gaming, television, film, and digital media series. The company has since launched into the virtual reality space, and in 2017, created an in-house digital studio for online content.

=== Subsidiaries ===
In April 2018, Skybound created Skybound Games to publish indie games and license video games based on its intellectual property. In September 2018 it established Skybound Stories, a joint venture with Sky Group creating narrative videos games for mobiles.

In 2021, Skybound became the largest shareholder in the listed game developer 5th Planet Games. This strategic move was aimed at gaining better access to the European market. Two years later, in 2023, Skybound became the majority shareholder of the company.

In 2021, Skybound created the in-house animation studio Skybound Animation to produce the hit adult animated series Invincible.

== Comics ==
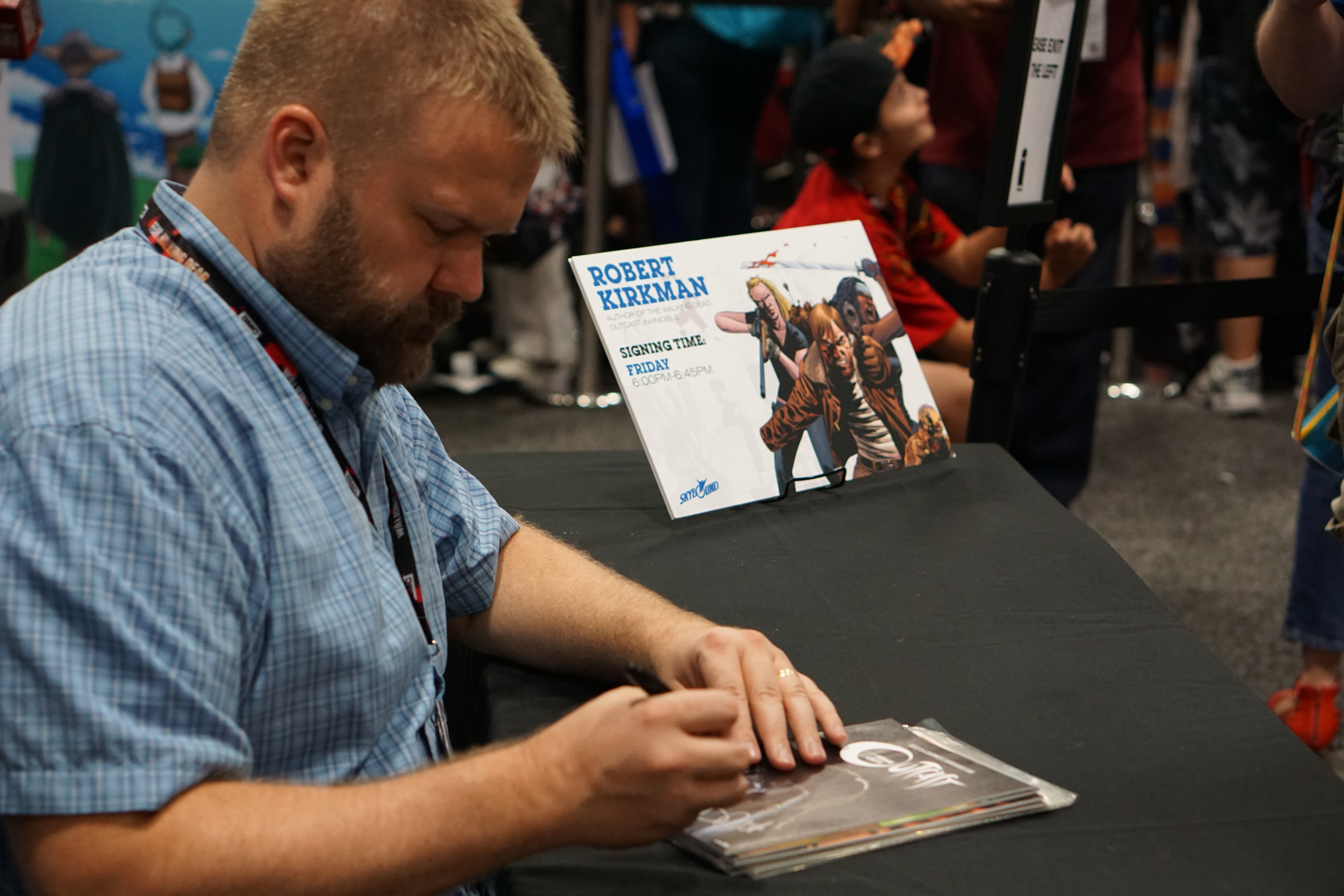
Kirkman signing at Skybound's booth during 2016 San Diego Comic Con

In addition to the Eisner Award-winning comic book series, The Walking Dead, Kirkman’s other titles include long-running superhero comic Invincible, Outcast, Super Dinosaur, Oblivion Song, and Fire Power.

With a creator-owned driven platform, Skybound has also created other popular comic book titles that include fantasy adventure comic Birthright, by Josh Williamson, and the historical fiction comic, Manifest Destiny by Chris Dingess.

In 2017, Skybound released the revenge comic, Extremity, by creator Daniel Warren Johnson, and their first vampire horror comic, Redneck, by Donny Cates. Kill the Minotaur by writers Christian Cantamessa and Chris Pasetto, and artist Lukas Ketner is set to hit comic shops on June 14, 2017. Recently, they have also started "Skyward" from the writer of the TV show Lucifer. In April 2021, it was announced a five issue miniseries called Skybound X would launch to celebrate 10 years of Skybound, with the book featuring different stories per issue, with one story being Rick Grimes: 2000 by Kirkman and Ryan Ottley.

In February 2023, it was announced that Robert Kirkman and Lorenzo De Felici would launch Void Rivals, a new series that would kick-off a new shared comic universe. In June 2023, it was later revealed that the book would launch the Energon Universe and that it would publish comics based on Transformers and G.I. Joe. This would include Void Rivals by Kirkman and De Felici, Transformers by Daniel Warren Johnson (which debuted in October 2023), Duke by Joshua Williamson and Tom Reilly (which debuted in December 2023), and Cobra Commander by Williamson and Andrea Milana (which debuted in January 2024). The Energon Universe has expanded to include the ongoing series G.I. Joe by Joshua Williamson, Tom Reilly and Andrea Milana (which debuted in November 2024) and M.A.S.K. by Dan Watters and Pye Parr (which debuted in June 2026).

=== Skybound Comet ===
In 2021, it was announced that Skybound would start a new line entitled Skybound Comet, with graphic novels meant for YA and Middle Grade readers. The first of these books include Clementine: Book One by Tillie Walden in July 2022, Everyday Hero Machine Boy by Tri Vuong and Irma Kniivila in September 2022, and Sea Serpent's Heir Book One by Mairghread Scott and Pablo Tunica in October 2022.

== Television and film ==
After Alpert and Kirkman's success with AMC’s The Walking Dead, the duo announced plans for their second television adaptation for Kirkman's comic, Outcast in October 2013. The series received a pickup order from Cinemax in February 2015. Outcast centers on protagonist, Kyle Barnes, played by Patrick Fugit, fighting a demon that has plagued his small Virginia town for decades. The series lineup includes Philip Glenister, Brent Spiner, Reg E. Cathey, and Wrenn Schmidt. The first season premiered on June 3, 2016 and it was renewed for a second season.

Skybound partnered with Viki to develop Korean pre-apocalyptic drama Five Year. The series will be shot in Korea as a K-drama with a local cast and crew, and the parties plan to distribute the first 16-episode season on Korean television. The series, based on an original story by Kirkman, centers on a family facing an impending apocalypse within the next five years. In 2017, Skybound announced a partnership with 360 Powwow to produce Five Year in various Latin American markets.

Skybound produced Robert Kirkman’s Secret History of Comics. This six-part docuseries explores a wide range of topics from the history and world of comic books and premiered on AMC on November 12, 2017.

In 2017, it was announced that a film based on Kirkman's second longest running comic series Invincible was being developed by Universal Pictures, with Seth Rogen and Evan Goldberg set to write/direct/produce the film with Kirkman serving as an executive producer. In 2018, it was announced that an adult animated series also based on Invincible was being developed for Amazon Prime Video featuring Steven Yeun as Invincible and J.K. Simmons as Omni-Man. The series is executive produced by Kirkman, who, in addition to serving as the creator and co-showrunner, wrote the pilot and the season finale, with co-showrunner Simon Racioppa. The executive producers are Kirkman, Alpert, Simon Racioppa, Margaret M. Dean, Cory Walker, Dan Duncan, Shaun O’Neill, Catherine Winder, Seth Rogen, and Evan Goldberg. Helen Leigh is co-executive producer. The series was released on March 26, 2021 to general acclaim and was renewed by Amazon for a second and third season, with the second season released in two parts; the first part released in November 2023 and the second part in March 2024. Following the second season finale the series was renewed for a fourth season on July 26, 2024. The third season released in February 2025, and the fourth followed in April 2026, earning a third straight 100% score on Rotten Tomatoes. In June 2026, Prime Video renewed Invincible for a sixth season ahead of the premiere of its fifth season. The renewal made Invincible the longest-running animated original series on Prime Video. Kirkman stated that there was “still so much story left to tell” and expressed enthusiasm for seasons five, six and beyond.

The company's other film projects include the feature film AIR, starring The Walking Dead’s Norman Reedus and Academy Award-nominated actor Djimon Hounsou. That same year, it was announced that Spin Master Entertainment and Atomic Cartoons would make an animated television series based on Super Dinosaur, a comic that Kirkman created alongside Jason Howard in 2011. The show launched in 2018.

In 2019, Universal Pictures announced the development of Renfield, a horror-comedy film about the character of the same name based on a pitch by Robert Kirkman, with Chris McKay set to direct. The film was produced by McKay, Kirkman, David Alpert, Bryan Furst, and Sean Furst in a joint-venture between Skybound and Universal. It released on April 14, 2023.

In July 2026, Amazon Prime gave a formal series order to Stillwater, a television adaptation of the Skybound comic created by Chip Zdarsky and Ramón K. Pérez. The horror thriller, developed by Greg Berlanti and Carly Wray, received an eight-episode order and is being produced by Amazon MGM Studios, Warner Bros. Television, Berlanti Productions and Skybound Entertainment. The series follows ex-convict Daniel West, who arrives in the mysterious town of Stillwater after receiving a letter promising an inheritance, only to discover a community where no one ages, no one dies and no one can leave. Robert Kirkman, David Alpert, Rick Jacobs, Glen Geller, and Chip Zdarsky serve as executive producers for Skybound.

== Digital ==
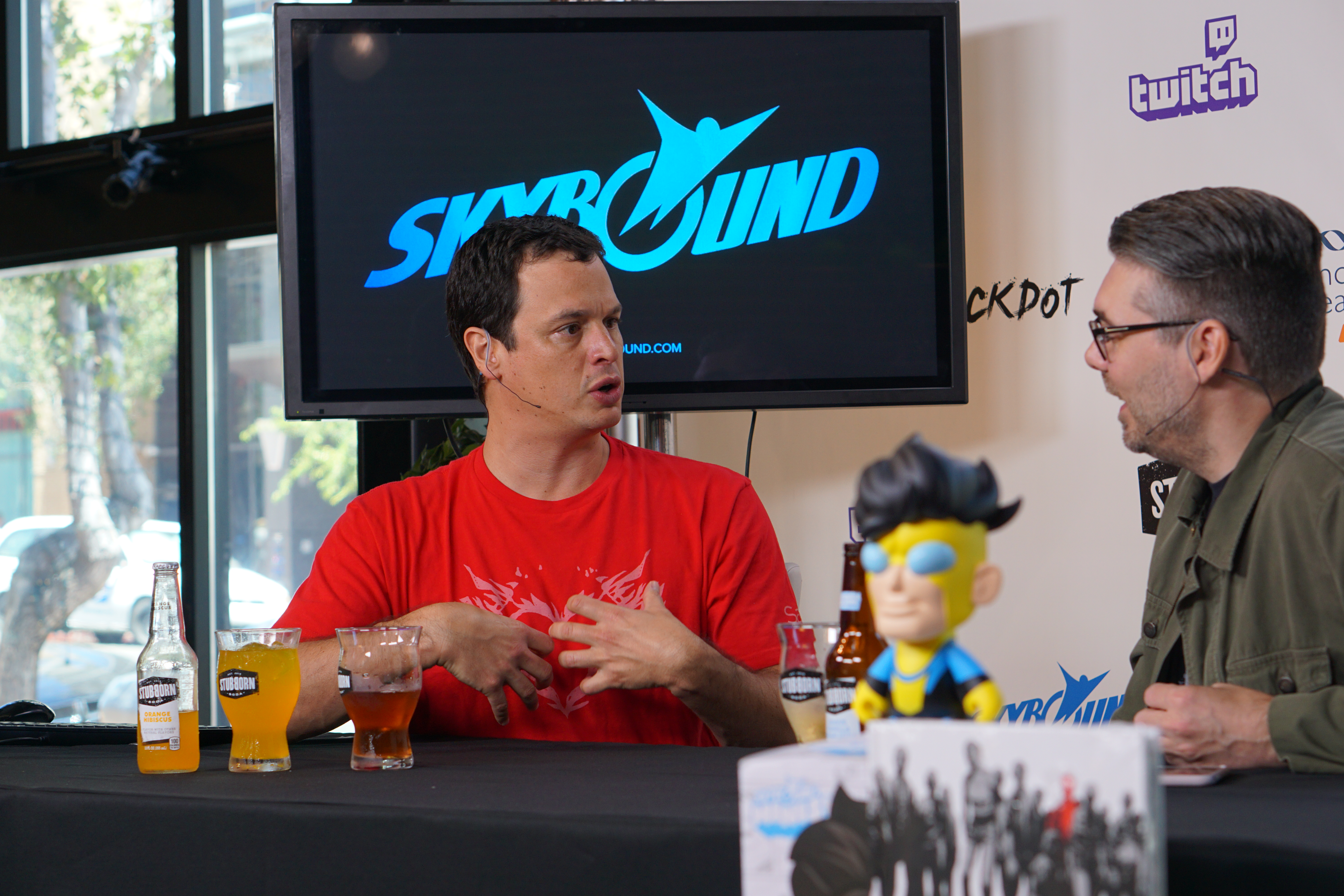
Skybound CEO, David Alpert, at Skybound's Live Stream during 2016 San Diego Comic Con

In 2015, Skybound released the first-ever narrative virtual reality series, Gone, for Samsung's Milk VR platform. Gone surrounds the disappearance of a young girl from a playground, and the family's journey in learning what happened. The series was filmed in 360 degrees and includes shifting perspectives with "hotspots." "Hotspots" are used as clues, offering a fully immersive experience. Gone was directed by J.T. Petty

As of 2016, Skybound is set to produce a horror VR series, Lies Within, the first project out of Skybound’s partnership with interactive theatrical company Delusion.

In 2017, Skybound opened an in-house studio to create and expand original digital content. Since the opening of the space, Skybound developed a Live.me series focusing on diversity in TV and media hosted by Yvette Nicole Brown. Other original content filmed in the studio include the weekly series Skybound’s Happy Hour. Happy Hour features special guests every week to create The Walking Dead inspired cocktails. Former guests have included Ross Marquand and Michael Traynor.

== Skybound Games ==
Skybound Games
- Type: Division
- Industry: Video games
- Founded: April 4, 2018; 8 years ago
- Founder: Robert Kirkman
- Headquarters: Los Angeles, California, US
- Parent: Skybound Entertainment
- Divisions: Howyaknow, LLC
- Website: www.skybound.com/games

In April 2018, Skybound announced the formation of Skybound Games, a publishing division focused on indie games, while also forming a mobile division Howyaknow, LLC. Coinciding with the announcement, the company also signed publishing deals for console versions of the games Slime Rancher and The Long Dark.

In October 2018, due to the collapse of Telltale Games, Skybound Games announced they would be working on finishing up the final two episodes of The Walking Dead: The Final Season, "Broken Toys" and "Take Us Back", to end the game adaptation of their series. In addition to continued digital release, Skybound Games also released physical editions of the game for PlayStation 4, Xbox One, and Nintendo Switch. In addition to obtaining publishing rights to The Walking Dead Telltale series, allowing the games to reappear on digital storefronts after being pulled due to Telltale's closure, Skybound released a complete edition of the series on Microsoft Windows, PlayStation 4, Xbox One, and Nintendo Switch.

In February 2019, Skybound Games announced plans to release the remastered versions of six classic Dungeon & Dragons games: Baldur's Gate, Baldur's Gate II, Baldur's Gate: Siege of Dragonspear, Icewind Dale, Planescape: Torment, and Neverwinter Nights, developed for modern computers by Beamdog, as console versions (both as physical and digital) later in the year. In 2020, Skybound Entertainment raised a new round of funding from the gaming company Com2uS Studios. The two companies signed a deal to develop a The Walking Dead mobile game.

In 2025 and 2026, Skybound expanded its focus on video games as part of its broader franchise strategy. CEO David Alpert described games as a long-term growth area for the company, citing it as both the highest monetization opportunity for the company and the medium in which fans spend the most time engaging with a franchise. Skybound’s strategy begins with developing and testing original intellectual property through lower-cost mediums such as comics and podcasts before expanding successful properties into television, film and eventually video games.

In June 2025, the tag fighter Invincible VS was announced, set for release in 2026. It is Skybound's first internally-developed game, being the debut title for their first in-house game studio, Quarter Up. Invincible VS received generally favorable reviews from critics upon its release in April 2026. Review aggregator Metacritic scored the game a 77 out of 100 based on critic reviews. Critics generally praised the games fast-paced 3v3 combat systems, accessibility, presentation and faithfulness to the Invincible franchise, while criticism focused on its limited single-player content, short story mode and lack of features for casual players.

Game Informer, which featured the game on its April 2026 cover, called the game’s foundation “approachable” and praised its personality, while IGN described its combat as “a gust of fresh air” for fans of tag-based fighting games. Eurogamer praised the game’s adaptation of the franchise, and TheGamer described it as effectively capturing the tone and violence of the source material.

In June 2026, the developers released the game’s Season 1 update, which added Universa and The Immortal as playable fighters, introduced an Endless Arcade mode and outlined a roadmap for future seasonal content. The roadmap included plans for additional seasons throughout 2026, including the addition of Angstrom Levy as a downloadable character in Season 2. Skybound also expressed support for a competitive tournament scene around the game and has promoted the company’s presence at fighting game events including VSFighting XIV, Community Effort Orlando (CEO) 2026 and EVO 2026.

In July 2026, Skybound Games laid off 20+ employees from Quarter Up. Skybound and publishing partner 5^{th} Planet Games stated that ongoing support for Invincible VS would include additional content updates, promotional activities, community events, developer livestreams and tournament participation. The companies reaffirmed plans for both Season 2 and Season 3 and continued support for competitive tournaments through the Competitive Support Program.

As part of its continued support for external developers, Skybound Games entered a publishing agreement with Wales Interactive and 5^{th} Planet Games in June 2026 to assume global publishing responsibilities for zombie survival first-person shooter Sker Ritual.According to a statement from Skybound, the partnership was driven by the companies’ shared interest in horror entertainment and Skybound’s experience with horror-related properties such as The Walking Dead. Under the agreement, Skybound and 5^{th} Planet Games took over publishing operations for Sker Ritual across digital and physical channels, including catalog optimization, promotional campaigns, storefront management, sales initiatives and bundled offerings designed to support the continued growth of the game’s audience.

== License and merchandise ==
Skybound's party game, Superfight, kickstarted in 2013. Superfight is a game where players battle made up superheroes against each other, in ridiculous, and often heated, hypothetical arguments. In 2014 Darin Ross partnered with Skybound to publish the game. Superfight has 19 expansion packs to date.

In 2017, Skybound signed a deal with Druid City Games for release of its game The Grimm Forest, which raised over $400,000 on Kickstarter.

== List of imprints ==
- Act 4 Publishing
- Skybound Comet

== List of subsidiaries ==
- 5th Planet Games
- GammaRay
- Sagafilm EHF
- Nine Four Entertainment
- Maple Media
- Scenario42

== Titles ==
- The Astounding Wolf-Man
- Battle Pope
- Battle Beast
- Before Your Eyes
- Birthright
- Brit
- Clone
- Cobra Commander
- Dark Ride
- Dead Body Road
- Destro
- Demonic (from Pilot Season)
- Die!Die!Die!
- Downward
- Duke
- Extremity
- Fire Power
- Ghosted
- G.I. Joe
- G.I. Joe: A Real American Hero
- Gone
- Goodnight Universe
- Guarding the Globe
- Green Valley
- Hardcore (from Pilot Season)
- Heroes and Villains: The History of Comics
- Horizon
- Homestead Arcana
- The Infinite
- Invincible
- Invincible Universe
- Kill the Minotaur
- Kim-Joy's Magic Bakery
- Kroma
- Lies Within
- Manifest Destiny
- Murder Falcon
- Oblivion Song
- Outcast
- Outpost Zero
- Oxenfree
- The Outer Darkness'
- Redneck
- Rainbow Billy: The Curse of the Leviathan
- Scarlett
- Science Dog
- Skybound X
- Skyward
- Stellar (from Pilot Season)
- Stillwater
- Tech Jacket
- Thief of Thieves
- Transformers
- Ultramega
- Void Rivals
- The Walking Dead
- Witch Doctor

== Feature films ==
Release date	Film	Details				
Release date	Film	Director(s)	Production companie(s)	Distributor(s)	Budget	Gross
2015	Air	Christian Cantamessa	Automatik Entertainment	Stage 6 Films; Vertical Entertainment	—N/a	—N/a
2023	Renfield	Chris McKay	Giant Wildcat	Universal Pictures	$65 million	$26.7 million
2025	The Electric State	Anthony Russo; Joe Russo	AGBO	Netflix	$320 million	—N/a

== Television shows ==
Year	Show	Details				
Year	Show	Creator(s)	Production companie(s)	Network(s)	Season(s)	Episodes
2010–2022	The Walking Dead	Based on The Walking Dead by: Robert Kirkman and Tony Moore and Charlie Adlard; Developed by: Frank Darabont	Idiot Box Productions; Circle of Confusion; Valhalla Entertainment; AMC Studios	AMC	11	177
2015–2023	Fear the Walking Dead	Based on The Walking Dead by: Robert Kirkman and Tony Moore and Charlie Adlard; Developed by: Robert Kirkman and Dave Erickson	Square Head Pictures; Circle of Confusion; Valhalla Entertainment; AMC Studios	AMC	8	113
2016	Scare PewDiePie	Felix Kjellberg	Maker Studios	YouTube Red	1	10
2016–2019	Outcast	Based on Outcast by: Robert Kirkman and Paul Azaceta; Developed by: Robert Kirkman	Circle of Confusion; Fox International Studios	Cinemax	2	20
2018–2019	Super Dinosaur	Based on Super Dinosaur by: Robert Kirkman and Jason Howard; Developed by: Kevin Burke; Chris "Doc" Wyatt	Spin Master Entertainment; Atomic Cartoons; Corus Entertainment	Teletoon (Canada)	1	26
2020–2021	The Walking Dead: World Beyond	Based on The Walking Dead by: Robert Kirkman and Tony Moore and Charlie Adlard; Developed by: Scott M. Gimple; Matthew Negrete	Idiot Box Productions; Circle of Confusion; Valhalla Entertainment; AMC Studios	AMC	2	20
2021–present	Invincible	Based on Invincible by: Robert Kirkman, Cory Walker and Ryan Ottley; Developed by: Robert Kirkman; Simon Racioppa	Skybound North; Wind Sun Sky Entertainment; Point Grey Pictures; Skybound Animation; Amazon MGM Studios	Amazon Prime Video	4	33
2022	Tales of the Walking Dead	Based on The Walking Dead by: Robert Kirkman and Tony Moore and Charlie Adlard; Developed by: Scott M. Gimple; Channing Powell	Illiterate Manifesto; Idiot Box Productions; Valhalla Entertainment; Circle of Confusion; AMC Studios	AMC; AMC+	1	6
2023–present	The Walking Dead: Dead City	Based on The Walking Dead by: Robert Kirkman and Tony Moore and Charlie Adlard; Developed by: Eli Jorné	Idiot Box Productions; Valhalla Entertainment; Circle of Confusion; Schneibot; AMC Studios	AMC	1	6
2023	Psi Cops	Bart Batchelor; Chris Nielsen	Corus Entertainment; Oddfellows Labs; Skybound Galactic; Wind Sun Sky Entertainment; Sony Pictures Television	Adult Swim (Canada)	1	24
2023–present	The Walking Dead: Daryl Dixon	Based on The Walking Dead by: Robert Kirkman and Tony Moore and Charlie Adlard; Developed by: David Zabel	Idiot Box Productions; Valhalla Entertainment; Circle of Confusion; Remainder Men; AMC Studios	AMC	2	7
2024	The Walking Dead: The Ones Who Live	Based on The Walking Dead by: Robert Kirkman and Tony Moore and Charlie Adlard; Developed by: Scott M. Gimple; Danai Gurira; Andrew Lincoln	Valhalla Entertainment; Circle of Confusion; Hush Hush Films; Gurazoo Productions; Idiot Box Productions; AMC Studios	AMC	1	6
2024	Classified	Kagiso Lediga	Diprente Films; Amazon Studios	Amazon Prime Video; Amazon Freevee	1	8
TBA	Stillwater	Based on Stillwater by: Chip Zdarsky and Ramón Pérez; Developed by: Greg Berlanti; Carly Wray	Berlanti Productions; Warner Bros. Television	Amazon Prime Video	TBA	TBA

== See also ==
- G.I. Joe: A Real American Hero (Skybound Entertainment)
