= Dude With Sign =

Instagram account

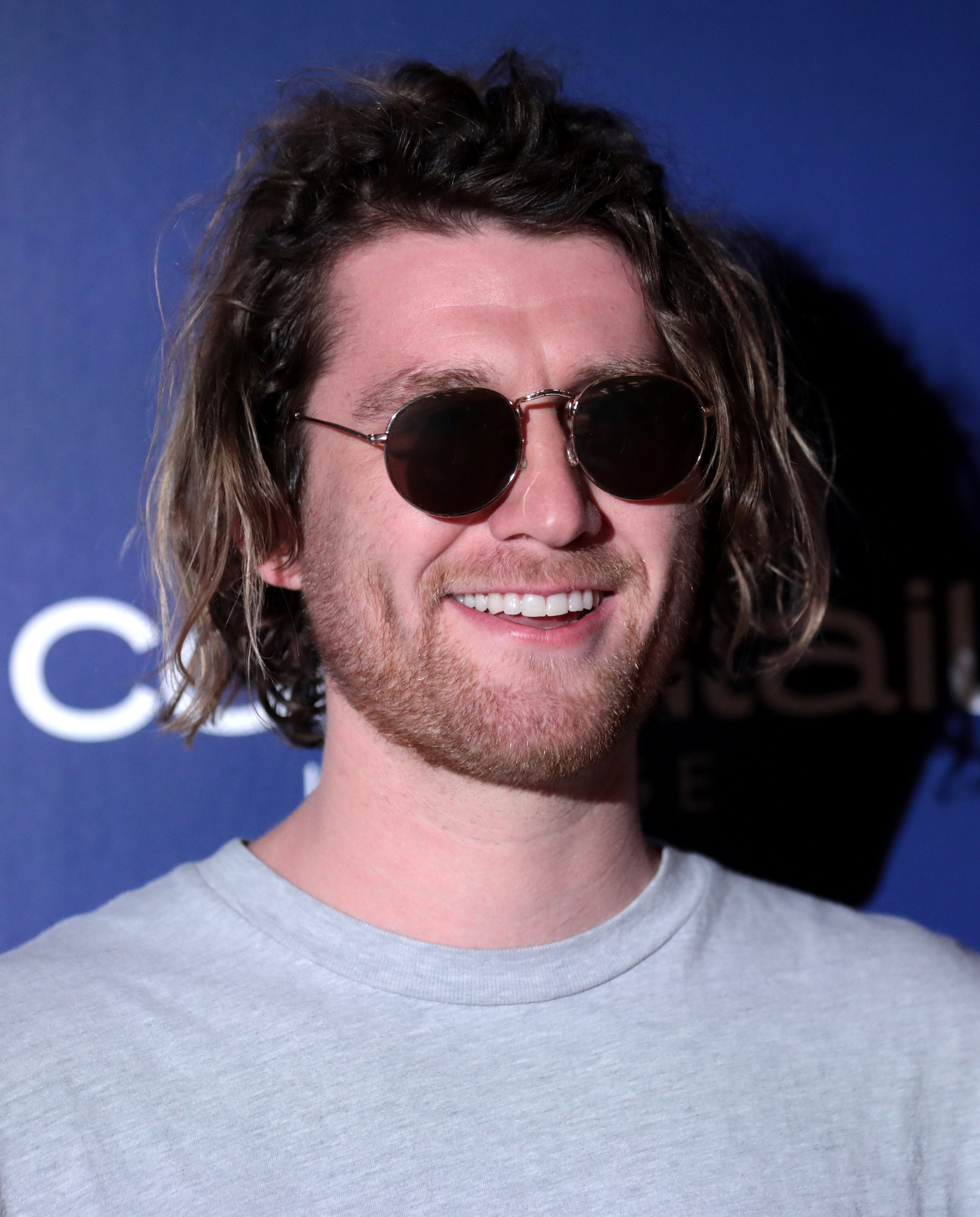
- Phillips in 2023

Instagram information
- Page: dudewithsign
- Years active: 2019–present
- Followers: 8 million (October 30, 2023)

Dude With Sign is an Instagram account that features Seth Phillips holding protest signs about everyday issues. It is produced by Jerry Media.

== History ==
The New York–based company Jerry Media (formerly Fuck Jerry) is known for producing viral marketing material. Jerry Media founder Elliot Tebele came up with the idea of writing whimsical messages on protest signs, posting a few on Instagram, and employee Seth Phillips later picked up the idea.

Dude With Sign posts generally show an expressionless Phillips in sunglasses holding a cardboard sign on a busy SoHo street corner. The signs communicate trivial grievances and observations about modern life. Phillips's first post, featuring a sign reading "Stop 'replying all' to company wide emails", went viral in October 2019. His next, saying "Seinfeld is way better than Friends", also went viral. Dude With Sign had 1.4 million followers by December 2019 and four million by the end of January 2020.

Sponsored content appeared on the account by early 2020, including advertisements for Old Spice, Sprint, and Justin Bieber's album Changes. Later partnerships have included ads for multiple underwear brands, a Super Bowl ad for Bud Light Seltzer Lemonade, and informative COVID-19 pandemic posts partnering with both the World Health Organization and President Joe Biden. BuzzFeed News reported in 2023 that at least seven lawsuits had been filed against companies that had created their own Dude With Sign ads without permission.
