= Magic Puzzle Company =

American jigsaw puzzle company

- Industry: Jigsaw Puzzles
- Founded: 2020 in California
- Founders: Ben Hantoot; Max Temkin
- Website: https://magicpuzzlecompany.com/

The Magic Puzzle Company is an American jigsaw puzzle company founded in 2020.

The company collaborates with magicians and artists to make jigsaw puzzles with narrative elements and Easter eggs. Its puzzles include a mix of traditional and unusual piece shapes and, once finished, can be rearranged to form new images, a feature the company calls Magic Shift. Magic Puzzle Company has worked with artists including Ghostshrimp, Boya Sun, and Felicia Chiao.

Magic Puzzle Company was founded in California in 2020 by Cards Against Humanity co-founders Max Temkin and Ben Hantoot following a Kickstarter campaign that raised over US$3 million. Temkin left both companies in 2020 following allegations of misconduct at Cards Against Humanity.

The Kickstarter campaign enabled the company to create the initial set of three puzzles, which created the first set (Series 1). Further sets followed in later years.

== Tasty Puzzle Company ==
In October 2026, Magic Puzzle Company began taking pre-orders for a new line of puzzles sold under the name Tasty Puzzle Company. The first series features three restaurants: Gage & Tollner, a chophouse in Brooklyn, New York; Oyster Oyster, a Michelin-starred vegetarian tasting-menu restaurant in Washington, D.C.; and Franklin Barbecue in Austin, Texas. Unlike the company's earlier puzzles, which use illustrated artwork, Tasty Puzzles are based on food photography.

Magic Puzzle Company puzzles
Series	Puzzle	Artist
1	The Happy Isles	Sarah Becan
1	The Mystic Maze	Boya Sun
1	The Sunny City	Felicia Chiao
2	The Crystal Caves	Sanja Stiković (Odsanyu)
2	The Busy Bistro	Oscar Sun
2	The Forest Feast	Sanne-Marie Kohlmann
3	The Secret Soup	Margaux Peltat
3	The Puzzled Patron	Taylor Rose
3	The Gnomes' Homes	Ninn Salaün
4	Big Rock City	Annika Brandow
4	The Awakened Artifacts	Kathleen Fu
4	The Peckish Pirates	Gozz
5	The Drippy Trip	Ghostshrimp
5	The Golden Goose	Anine Bösenberg
5	The Coveted Comet	Samuel Hayward
6	The Spooky Shire	Kasey Uhter
6	The Wild Wizards	Stifflizard
6	The Stilted City (Note: Not yet released as of October 2026.)	TBA
Special ed.	The Festive Factory	Kathleen Fu
