= Dead Body Road =

American comic book series

- Cover to first issue. Art by Matteo Scalera.

Publication information
- Publisher: Image Comics/Skybound
- Schedule: Monthly
- Format: Limited series
- Genre: Action
- Publication date: December 2013 – May 2013; Bad Blood: June 2020 – December 2020
- No. of issues: 6 Bad Blood: 6
- Main character(s): Orson Gage; Bad Blood: Bree Hale

Creative team
- Written by: Justin Jordan
- Artist(s): Matteo Scalera; Bad Blood: Ben Tiesma
- Letterer(s): Pat Brosseau
- Colorist(s): Moreno Dinisio; Bad Blood: Mat Lopes
- Editor(s): Sean Mackiewicz; Bad Blood: Jon Moisan

Collected editions
- Dead Body Road: ISBN 978-1632150479
- Vol. 2: Bad Blood: ISBN 978-1534317215

Dead Body Road is an American comic book series created by writer Justin Jordan and artist Matteo Scalera. It was announced at the 2013 San Diego Comic-Con by Skybound Entertainment as a collaboration with Image Comics, and began publication in December of the same year. A trade paperback collecting the series was released in June 2014.

== Plot summary ==
Orson Gage is out for revenge. Already damaged from a destructive career as lawman, Gage is going from broken to shattered as his wife is gunned down in a bank heist gone wrong. While the criminal gang that pulled it off is busy fighting amongst themselves about the blood-soaked rewards of their take, Gage is only looking for one thing: retribution.

== Bad Blood ==
A sequel miniseries was released in 2020, titled Dead Body Road: Bad Blood, which follows Bree Hale trying to save her brother from local crime boss Monk Sinclair. It ran for 6 issues from June to December 2020.

== Collected editions ==
Title	Material collected	Format	Publication date	ISBN
Dead Body Road	Dead Body Road #1–6	Trade paperback	June 25, 2014	978-1632150479
Dead Body Road: Bad Blood	Dead Body Road: Bad Blood #1–6	Trade paperback	January 27, 2021	978-1534317215

== Reception ==
According to review aggregator Comic Book Roundup, the first trade paperback received an average score of 8.3/10 based on 70 individual reviews of the collected single issues. The sequel series' trade paperback received an average score of 7.9/10 based on 26 individual reviews of the six issues.
