= Witch Doctor (comics) =

Publication information
- Publisher: Skybound Entertainment
- Format: Ongoing series
- Genre: Horror, dark fantasy, medical drama
- Publication date: 2011–2013
- No. of issues: 10 (as of February 2013)
- Main character(s): Dr. Vincent Morrow, Eric Gast, Penny Dreadful

Creative team
- Created by: Brandon Seifert, Lukas Ketner
- Written by: Brandon Seifert
- Artist: Lukas Ketner
- Letterer: Brandon Seifert
- Colorist(s): Sunny Gho, Jamie Grant, Andy Troy
- Editor: Sina Grace

Collected editions
- Under the Knife: ISBN 1-60706-441-3

Witch Doctor is a US comic book created by writer Brandon Seifert and artist Lukas Ketner. It was the first title published by Skybound Entertainment, an imprint of Image Comics. As of early 2014, Witch Doctor consists of a four-issue mini-series, an issue #0 printed as a flipbook with The Walking Dead #85, a one-shot subtitled Witch Doctor: The Resuscitation, and a second six-issue mini-series entitled Witch Doctor: Mal Practice, which debuted in November 2012. The first mini-series and #0 issue were reprinted in a collected edition called Witch Doctor Vol. 1: Under the Knife, while the second mini-series and The Resuscitation are scheduled to be collected as Witch Doctor Vol. 2: Mal Practice in June 2013.

A first issue was printed in July 2010, Black and White, with title "First Incision - Interview with the Tapeworm", the flipbook with The Walking Dead #85 is the same, but colored.

== Description ==
Witch Doctor combines elements of the horror and medical drama genres. The protagonist, Dr. Vincent Morrow, is a maverick doctor who specializes in "supernatural medicine," supplementing common medical practices with magic. Dr. Morrow's "cases" predominantly involve infectious supernatural creatures like vampires, demonic possession, as well as elements based on the cosmic horror of H.P. Lovecraft. In the first Witch Doctor mini-series, Dr. Morrow treats (and battles) a vampire, demons possessing a child, faerie changelings, and Deep Ones (crossed with the Creature From the Black Lagoon), among others.

Dr. Morrow is assisted by Eric Gast, a paramedic who is apparently new to the world of the supernatural, and "Penny Dreadful", a college student who seems to be infected and controlled by a supernatural creature of some sort.

While Dr. Morrow demonstrates the knowledge of a practicing medical doctor, his equipment and diagnoses are almost totally supernatural. He wields Excalibur, owns the Holy Grail (used predominantly as an IV or a syringe) and many other magical artifacts. Spellcraft is provided mostly by these artifacts, as well as pills and intravenous infusions (for example, Morrow swallows a "sleeping pill" in order to cast a spell to put a patient to sleep).

== List of major characters ==
- Dr. Vincent Morrow
- Eric Gast
- Penny Dreadful

== Reception ==
The first Witch Doctor mini-series was both a sales and a critical success for Skybound, earning praise from comics media sources like IGN, horror publications like Fangoria, and geek culture media sites including Boing Boing, io9, and The A.V. Club.

Witch Doctor #1 was number 163 on Diamond Comics Distributors' top 300 chart for June, 2011, selling an estimated 12,592 copies. It was the fifth highest-selling title from Image Comics for that month, behind The Walking Dead #86, Invincible #80, Spawn #208 and Haunt #16. Witch Doctor #1 received a rating of 4 out of 5 from Comic Book Resources, a rating of 7.0 out of 10 from IGN, and a rating of 5 out of 5 from Comics Bulletin.

Cory Doctorow gave Witch Doctor Vol. 1 a positive review on Boing Boing, calling it "charmingly demented" and stating "Ketner and Seifert's sensibility is perfectly potty, and their titular doctor is a blend of Doctor Who and Spider Jerusalem. The metaphysics they reveal through the gruesome adventures in this volume has a weird internal consistency, but it's so cockeyed and frankly revolting that I can honestly say it never occurred to me before they scarred me with it." He concluded, "This is a fine debut, and I can't wait for future volumes."
