= Superfight =

Party card game

- Designers: Jack Dire
- Publisher: Skybound Games
- Release date: 2015; 11 years ago
- Players: 3 – 10
- Age range: 10+
- Deck: Dedicated

Superfight is a party card game in which players have to make a combination of cards that represent their own superpowers and face off against a villain in the same fashion, and the players must then argue about how their created superhero can defeat other heroes, or a villain character depending on the game mode being played. After its initial release, many expansion packs have been created to add onto the base game, some taking more adult themes while others take on group qualities, locations, or more heroes.

== Development ==
Superfight first appeared as a crowdfunding campaign on Kickstarter in 2013 by Jack Dire and quickly became funded. However in 2014, it went through a major rewrite, recreating over 30% of the content that was provided after the original release. Even after its development, the game has continued to develop with multiple expansion packs, currently with 19 available to the public. After its successful Kickstarter campaign, Superfight came to the attention of Skybound Entertainment who later became its publisher.

== Reception ==
Kotaku was positive about the game:

Superfight! brings out the best of that imagination and love for fictional worlds. It indulges us in our desire for silly discussions.
