= What Do You Meme? =

Card game

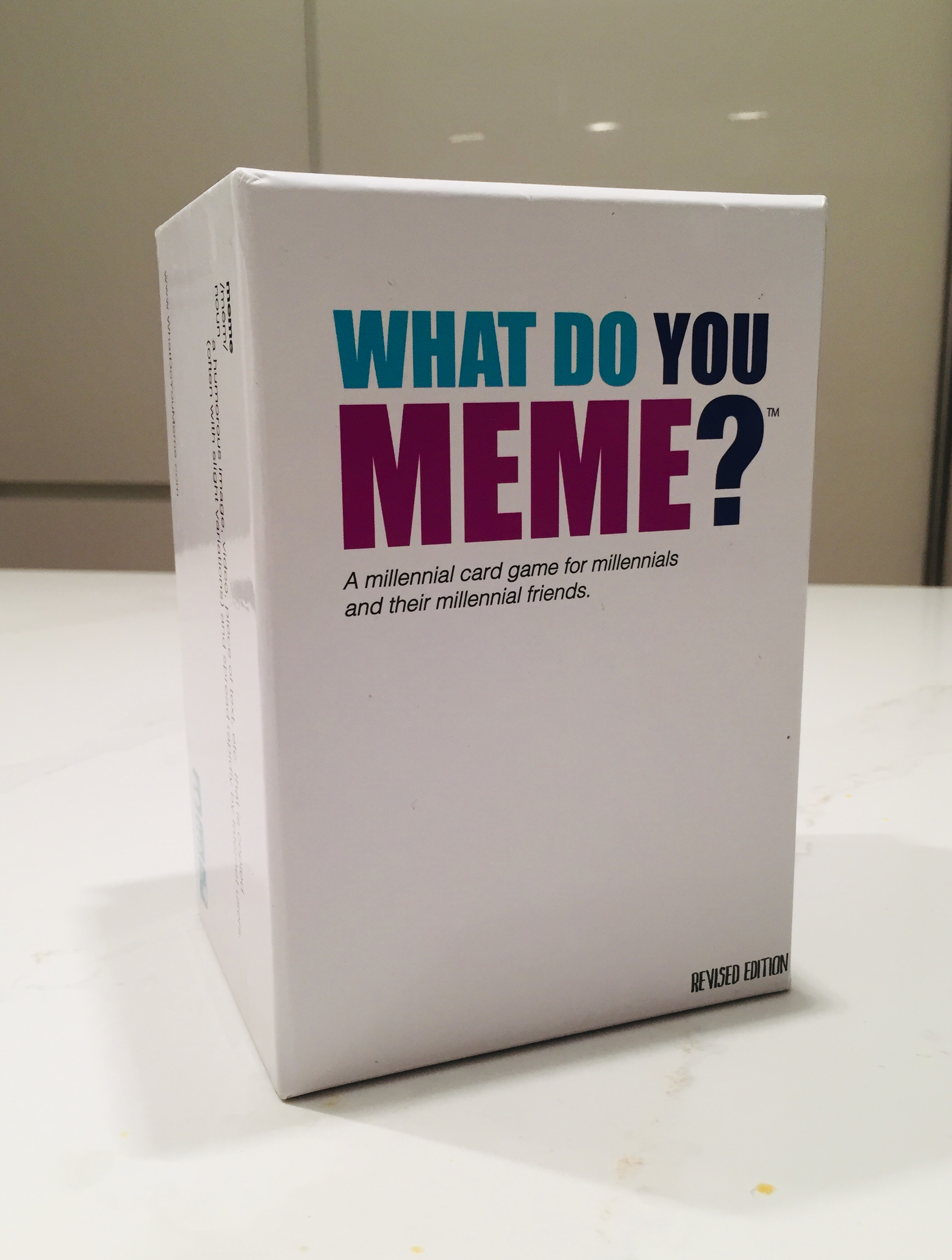
- Designers: Elliot Tebele, Ben Kaplan, Elie Ballas.
- Publisher: What Do You Meme, LLC
- Release date: August 2016; 10 years ago
- Players: 3–20+
- Age range: 17+
- Website: https://whatdoyoumeme.com/

What Do You Meme? is a humorous party card game from Jerry Media in which players propose caption cards as a match to a designated photo (or meme) card. The judge of the round chooses the caption that they think is the best match to photo card, and whoever played that card gets a point. The name of the game refers to internet memes and is a play on the phrase what do you mean. The game has been compared to Cards Against Humanity. The game was created by Elliot Tebele, Elie Ballas and Ben Kaplan in 2016. It was launched on Kickstarter on June 14, 2016, and it exceeded its goal of $10,000. The following year, in 2017, it was the 9th best selling game on Amazon.

== Gameplay ==
The game comes with 75 photo cards and 360 caption cards. Intended for between three and twenty people at once, the game requires players to choose a caption card to match a given photo card. A judge, called "The Jerry", chooses the funniest caption card out of all those submitted during that round, and whoever had submitted it is the champion of the round. What Do You Meme sells themed expansion packs. The game has partnered with various brands to launch expansion packs such as the SpongeBob SquarePants Family Edition. These cards feature many different themes, such as adult jokes.
