= Super Dinosaur =

American comic book series

- Cover of Super Dinosaur 1, art by Jason Howard

Publication information
- Publisher: Skybound (Image Comics)
- First appearance: Super Dinosaur #1 (June 2011)
- Created by: Robert Kirkman; Jason Howard

In-story information
- Species: Tyrannosaurus
- Place of origin: Inner Earth
- Team affiliations: Earth Corps.
- Partnerships: Derek Dynamo.
- Notable aliases: SD.
- Abilities: Each robotic suit gives him different abilities. But natural abilities include expert marksmanship, heightened reflexes and quick learning. Suits allow near limitless weaponry, super human strength, flight, heat resistance and expert-level hand to hand capabilities.

Super Dinosaur is an American comic book series published by Image Comics' Skybound imprint beginning in 2011. The comic was created by writer Robert Kirkman and artist Jason Howard, who had previously worked together on Image's The Astounding Wolf-Man.

== Publication history ==
The idea for Super Dinosaur originated approximately two years prior to the series debut. Jason Howard drew a picture of a Tyrannosaurus with a cape for his then-five-year-old son. Howard shared the sketch with Robert Kirkman, who suggested the dinosaur's natural small arms could control larger robotic ones. "It was that goofy visual that was the beginning of the concept," Kirkman told USA Today. Both Kirkman and Howard wanted to create a comic that they could read with their children and enjoy together. Kirkman described Super Dinosaur as "a Pixar movie on paper ... I want it to be a true all-ages book in that it's appropriate for kids young enough but still able to read, and it's still something that my fan base will probably enjoy."

== Plot synopsis ==
Scientists Doctor Dynamo and Max Maximus discovered a hole in the Earth that led to Inner Earth, a place where dinosaurs live. In addition to dinosaurs, Inner Earth is home to DynOre, a valuable deposit of solar power contained in a rock.

While conducting experiments there, Maximus genetically altered a Tyrannosaurus, with which he tried to take over the world. Doctor Dynamo and his son, Derek, stopped him and formed a team with the Super Dinosaur to protect Inner Earth from Maximus. As Kirkman explains:

"In the falling out between Max Maximus and the Dynamos, Doctor Dynamo was injured to the point where he can't really think as much as he could before. His brain isn't really working right but he doesn't know it, so Derek has to go behind him and finish his equations for him, correcting his work and doing whatever he can to make sure that his father doesn't realize that he has this ailment now. It's also so the government overseers don't see that their operation is being run by a 10-year-old kid, so it's to make his dad look good and make sure that he can keep working."

== Characters ==
Heroes

- Derek Dynamo: 10-year-old son of Doctor Dynamo; genius inventor. Derek is a fun-loving, enthusiastic boy who possesses genius-level intelligence and has decided to use it to fight crime alongside his friend and partner, Super Dinosaur. At the start of the series, Derek lives with his father and Super Dinosaur at a secret military installation called the Dynamo Dome, shown inventing various combat devices to be used against rogues such as the evil Doctor Maximus. When crime-fighting, Derek uses a variety of technical inventions, such as wrist-mounted battle gauntlets, mechanical exoskeletons, and a transforming robot called Wheels. Derek was previously injured in a fight with Max Maximus, causing him to lose some of his memories, mainly those of his mother.
- Super Dinosaur: A genetically altered Tyrannosaurus rex who is Derek's best friend. Super Dinosaur was created several years prior when Doctor Dynamo and Doctor Maximus first discovered the Inner Earth, a prehistoric underground land inhabited by dinosaurs. Without Dynamo's knowledge, Maximus took an unhatched T. rex egg back to the surface for study and experimentation. In addition to increasing his intelligence, Maximus limited Super Dinosaur's size to make him more manageable; with the intent of using him as a prototype for a race of genetically engineered dinosaur soldiers. Unfortunately for Maximus, Super Dinosaur proved too intelligent and turned against him in order to fight evil with the Dynamos. When fighting super-villains, Super Dinosaur wears several types of mechanical harnesses that act as exoskeletons, which he operates with miniature control pads customized for his limited reach. Super Dinosaur enjoys playing video games, basketball, and using slang introduced to him by Derek.
- Doctor Dexter Dynamo: Derek's father and scientist; co-discoverer of Inner Earth and the energy-producing element Dynore with former partner Max Maximus. Prior to the start of the series, he was involved in an industrial explosion caused by Maximus which left his intelligence stunted to the point where Derek oversees the majority of his work. Maximus not only limited Dynamo's intelligence, but also erased the memories of his missing wife, Julianna, from both Derek and Dynamo's minds, as well as capturing her to use as leverage. Dynamo agrees to aid Maximus in his escape from prison under the condition that Maximus release Julianna.
- General Casey: Military administrator to the Dynamos and their super-heroic activities; oversees the majority of their funding, deployment into combat situations, and imprisonment of defeated super-villains at Earthcore Headquarters. In combat against the Exile, he is shown to use a power-suit and "Gun-Hammer", an energy-rifle that can transform into a gravity-hammer.
  - Battle Shock: Casey's impulsive son. A young boy, about the same age as Derek, who attempted to capture a destitute Squidious single-handedly with stolen military equipment (imitating the antics of Derek). He was later grounded by Casey.
- Wheels: A robot created by Derek that he often uses as an impromptu transportation device. It can transform into a skateboard, hover-board, jetpack, and underwater diving motor.
- The Kingstons: A family of mechanics who recently moved into the Dynamo's headquarters to provide technical support; responsible for building and repairing Derek and Super Dinosaur's combat equipment.
  - Bruce: Husband to Sarah and father to Erin and Erica.
  - Sarah: Wife to Bruce and mother to Erin and Erica.
  - Erin: A charismatic and curious girl who makes quick friends with Derek upon the Kingston's arrival to the Dynamo Dome. She is fascinated by all the amazing technology created by Doctor Dynamo and Derek and responds to her family's move much more positively than her sister. She has a crush on Derek.
  - Erica: An initially sullen girl who remains uncooperative with the thought of living with the Dynamos and moving away from her life in Washington D.C. She somewhat maliciously re-activated a tracking device which led to Maximus learning the location of the Dynamo Dome and attacking it with the massive Mega-Raptor in hopes of killing Doctor Dynamo and Derek. She expressed regret over these actions, and admitted that she thought if the location of the Dynamo Dome was compromised that she would be able to go back home. Derek and her family later forgave her after the fight with Maximus, being that her actions indirectly led to his capture. She is next seen warming up to Super Dinosaur by asking him to teach her how to play basketball.
- Pixie: A robot created by Derek who resembles Wheels, but with a pink color scheme. It was given to Erin as a gift so that she would have her own robot.

Villains

- Doctor Max Maximus: A scientist and the former colleague of Doctor Dynamo. Maximus is responsible for the majority of tragedies that have befallen the Dynamos, such as his attempts to steal Dynore, conquer the surface world and Inner Earth, and erasing Doctor Dynamo's wife from his and Derek's memories. Maximus is prone to megalomania and believes himself to be vastly more intelligent and worthy of recognition than either of the Dynamos. He is holding Doctor Dynamo's wife, Julianna, captive in exchange for Dynamo breaking him out of prison. Maximus's left arm is a robotic prosthetic made to replace the one that was bitten off by Super Dinosaur during his first battle with the Dynamos.
- Dino-Men: A group of genetically engineered dinosaur/human hybrids who formerly served Maximus but currently hold world-conquering plans of their own.
  - The Exile: The former leader of the Dino-Men, who wields a volatile energy staff composed of Dynore. The Exile believes in the genetic superiority of the Dino-Men over the human race, and has been seen working with Squidious to reach his goals. After several clashes with Derek and Super Dinosaur, the Exile is captured and claims to be the vanguard of the Reptiloid Empire, a humanoid race of lizard-men from Inner Earth who seek war with the human race. In issues 12 through to 15, it is revealed that the Exile is actually from the very centre of the planet. He was exiled because his brother, the ruler of the empire, was suspicious of him attempting a coup because he wanted to explore Outer-Earth. The Exile's attempts to get into inner earth were not to start an illegal mining operation as was first thought, but rather to get back home with the hopes of summoning an invasion army. During his attempts, he figured that simply entering alone would not suffice, he had to bring back evidence of intelligent life, a prisoner, Derek Dynamo.
  - Tricerachops: A female Triceratops who wields a battle-axe. She initially holds no ill-will towards Derek and Super Dinosaur for attacking Dino-Men loyal to Maximus and questions why they must be enemies rather than allies. However, as Derek points out, while some Dino-Men are not minions of Maximus, they all still want to take over the world. Tricerachops later joins Tyrannosaurus-X and becomes his mate.
  - Terrordactyl: A Pterodactyl who uses air-based weaponry. While hiding in Squidious' underwater lair, he is revealed to have some form of aquaphobia. This causes him to have a panic attack and escape to the surface, where he inadvertently catches the attention of Derek and Super Dinosaur.
  - Dreadasaurus: A Stegosaurus.
  - Breakeosaurus: A Brachiosaurus.
- Maximus' Dino-Men: A subset of dinosaur minions created to be completely loyal to Professor Maximus.
  - Painkylosaurus: An Ankylosaurus; wields a sword.
  - Doometrodon: A Dimetrodon; has a mini-gun shoulder-mounted on his right arm.
  - Byronobeast: A Byronosaurus.
  - Unnamed Parasaurolophus: A Parasaurolophus.
  - Mega-Raptor: Also known as Project X, Mega-Raptor is a Velociraptor created by Maximus to be the anti-thesis of Super Dinosaur; he is easier to control because he is twice as large and only half as intelligent. Mega-Raptor uses a pair of mechanical talons attached to its forearms as weapons.
  - Minimus: An imperfect clone of Maximus created to be the ideal lab assistant capable of carrying out Maximus' schemes while in prison. Although initially human, Minimus was genetically altered with dinosaur DNA to perfect his inherent cellular degradation, which causes him to gradually transform into an anthropomorphic Tyrannosaurus dubbed Tyrannosaurus-X.
- Squidious: A super-intelligent giant squid with the ability to manipulate minerals, such as coral and molten rock, into handheld weapons and humanoid limbs. Squidious is known to have a short temper and is prone to rampage when people disrespect him. Throughout the series, he claims dominion over the oceans and is shown operating in an underwater city/base-of-operations staffed by Shark-Men, constructed upon the back of a Kronosaurus. In issue #6, the Exile betrays Squidious and leads a mutiny against him with the aid of the Shark-Men. Squidious plots revenge against the Exile and his forces, agreeing to fight alongside Derek and SD in an effort to foil the Exile's plans and reclaim his underwater throne.
  - Shark-Men: Humanoid shark minions of Squidious who betray him in favor of the Exile. They are not very intelligent and claim to only follow those who are strongest.

== Reception ==
Doug Zawisza of Comic Book Resources described the first issue of the series as "compelling and fun, and oh, so very comic booky. This is the type of all ages comic that truly plays well to all ages without pandering, demeaning, or flat-out lying. There's enough conflict and suspense for more experienced comic readers and lots of wonderful images, scenes, characters, and gadgets for newer readers." Bleeding Cool's Rich Johnston said, "at its heart, this is a drama about two entwined families dealing with all manner of antagonists. And it's so much deeper and richer for it." Newsarama's Shanna VanVolt criticized the Derek Dynamo character, calling him "unlikeable" and adding, "if 'kids these days' are even half as full of themselves as young Dynamo, I am sincerely worried about our future."

== TV series ==
On November 22, 2017, Canadian toy company Spin Master and broadcaster Corus Entertainment announced an animated adaptation by Atomic Cartoons which was first released on September 8, 2018 on Teletoon.

== Mobile game ==
On October 24, 2018, Canadian mobile game studio Big Blue Bubble launched Super Dinosaur: Kickin' Tail, a mobile battle game featuring characters and locations from the Super Dinosaur TV series. The game was released in Canada for free on the App Store and Google Play.

== Collected editions ==
Title	Material collected	Publication date	ISBN
Super Dinosaur, Volume 1	Super Dinosaur #1–5; Super Dinosaur Origin Special #1	December 6, 2011	978-1607064206
Super Dinosaur, Volume 2	Super Dinosaur #6–11	July 4, 2012	978-1607065685
Super Dinosaur, Volume 3	Super Dinosaur #12–17	February 20, 2013	978-1607066675
Super Dinosaur, Volume 4	Super Dinosaur #18–23	January 28, 2015	978-1607068433
Super Dinosaur Compendium One	Super Dinosaur #1–23; Super Dinosaur Origin Special #1	6 August 2024	978-1534327757
