= List of The Transformers characters =

This article shows a list of characters from The Transformers television series that aired during the debut of the American and Japanese Transformers media franchise from 1984 to 1991.

== Autobots ==
The Autobots (also known as Cybertrons in Japan) are the heroes in the Transformers toyline and related spin-off comics and cartoons. Their main leader is Optimus Prime, but other "Primes" have also commanded the Autobots such as Rodimus Prime. They are constantly at war with the evil Decepticons. In the American cartoon line, the Autobots are the descendants of a line of robots created as consumer goods by the Quintessons.

=== Main characters ===
| Name | Alternate mode | First and last appearances | | Voiced by | Status |
|---|---|---|---|---|---|
| Orion Pax/Optimus Prime | 1984 Freightliner FLT cab-over | More Than Meets the Eye (Part 1) | The Rebirth (Part 3) | Optimus Prime: Peter Cullen; Orion Pax: Laurie Faso | Alive (Died again in Headmasters) |
Optimus Prime is the Autobots' stalwart leader and among the strongest and most courageous of all Cybertronians. Most continuities depict Optimus as having once been an unimportant miner or guard named Orion Pax who, in recognition of his honor and bravery, is mystically chosen by the Matrix of Leadership to become a messianic warrior-commander known as a "Prime," after which he adopts the moniker "Optimus." Having accepted this mantle, Optimus feels that his purpose is to protect all life, including Earth life. When in vehicle mode, Optimus is often accompanied by a large trailer, which itself can transform into a command unit equipped with a versatile mechanic and artillery robot, and from this he can deploy a small scout car known as Roller. Injury to one of these modules is often felt by Optimus himself. Optimus has been killed and revived numerous times throughout the franchise, often via self-sacrifice, and his prior relationship with Megatron is often a plot point or element of their shared background.
| Bumblebee | 1970 Volkswagen Beetle sedan | More Than Meets the Eye (Part 1) | He was rebuilt and turned into Goldbug in "The Return of Optimus Prime" Part 2, and last appeared in "The Rebirth" Part 3 (as an animation error.) | Dan Gilvezan | Alive, Reformed as Goldbug |
Small, eager, and brave, Bumblebee acts as a messenger, scout, and spy, daring to go where others cannot and will not. He is the most energy efficient, has the best vision of all Autobots, and is able to go underwater for reconnaissance and salvage missions. Although he is usually the physically weakest Autobot, his stealth more than compensates for this inadequacy, and he offsets his underdog status with courage and scrappiness. This battle-tested robot was the first Autobot to ally with the humans. He is a very close ally to humans, Spike Witwicky, often seen as an underdog and not the biggest bot; he has more courage than any soldier from Cybertron. As the most trusted lieutenant of Optimus, he will do whatever it takes to protect Earth and its people. While he often idolizes the bigger Autobots, especially Optimus Prime and Prowl, and occasionally feels inferior to them, Bumblebee is simultaneously unusually adept at forming friendships with humans, such as Spike Witwicky. In "The Return of Optimus Prime" Part 2, Bumblebee was rebuilt and renamed Goldbug after being severely damaged in battle. In later adaptations, Bumblebee is often depicted as mute, able to communicate only via beeps and whistles or through the use of pre-recorded radio clips, though his voice box operates normally in the G1 series.
| Cliffjumper | 1980 Porsche 924 Carrera GT | More Than Meets the Eye (Part 1) | Five Faces of Darkness (Part 1) in a flashback from The Transformers: The Movie | Casey Kasem | Alive |
"Let me at 'em" is Cliffjumper's motto. His eagerness and daring have no equal. He is driven by a desire to win the battle against the Decepticons. Finds Earth terrain a hindrance. One of the fastest of all Autobots, and often uses his speed to draw fire away from others. Shoots "glass gas", which makes metal as brittle as glass. His recklessness often leads to actual blowouts and situations too dangerous for him to handle.
| Wheeljack | 1976 Lancia Stratos turbo | More Than Meets the Eye (Part 1) | Found dead by Arcee in The Transformers: The Movie | Christopher Collins | Dead (Alive in Headmasters and Victory) |
Wheeljack is the mad scientist of the Autobot faction. Always inventing new weapons and gadgets, he is the Dinobots' primary creator in the G1 series and among their most ardent supporters. Adept at driving while in car mode, he is sometimes depicted as performing stunts or showing off. Wheeljack can fly using solid-fuel rockets in arms, and shoots magnetic inducer, shrapnel-needle, and gyro-inhibitor shells from his shoulder cannons. He is sometimes his own worst enemy and is often injured while experimenting with new weapons. Storyboards for The Transformers: The Movie suggest Wheeljack was originally intended to survive the movie, but his corpse is clearly shown in the final product. Due to this somewhat late change and the delay in Japan's release of The Transformers: The Movie, the developed-in-parallel Japanese-only seasons show Wheeljack as alive. This contradiction was later handwaved by Japanese-only supplemental material by reference to time travel.
| Prowl | 1980 Nissan 280ZX police | More Than Meets the Eye (Part 1) | Killed by a Constructicon in The Transformers: The Movie. | Michael Bell | Dead (Alive in Headmasters) |
Prowl is the Autobot military strategist and will keep at a task for as long as it takes. Striving to find reason and logic in everything, he is a listener, not a talker. He relies on having the most sophisticated logic center of all Autobots to analyze and advise on complex combat situations almost instantaneously. The unexpected can sometimes throw him off guard. Prowl fires wire-guided incendiary missiles and high-corrosive acid pellets. Like Wheeljack, Prowl survived The Transformers: The Movie" in a roundabout way, with his post-movie appearance in Japanese-only media being explained away by the same time travel events.
| Jazz | 1976 Porsche 935 | More Than Meets the Eye (Part 1) | Call of the Primitives | Scatman Crothers, Wally Burr ("Kremzeek!" episode only) | Alive |
Jazz loves Earth culture and music. Always looking to learn more, his knowledge of Earth makes him an indispensable right-hand man to Optimus Prime, to whom he often serves as second (though sometimes this role is delegated to Ironside, Ratchet, or Ultra Magnus instead, depending on the episode or continuity). Cool, stylish, and daring, he can be prone to distraction at times. Nevertheless, Jazz frequently takes on dangerous missions befitting his versatility and competence. Equipped with a photon rifle, a flamethrower, a full-spectrum beacon, and 180 dB stereo speakers. Creates dazzling, disorienting sound and light shows.
| Sideswipe | 1982 Lamborghini Countach LP500S | Appears in "More Than Meets the Eye" (Part 1). First speaks in More Than Meets the Eye (Part 2). | Masquerade | Michael Bell | Alive |
Sideswipe is nearly the equal of his twin brother, Sunstreaker, in the combat arts but less cold-blooded, acting somewhat like a stereotypical jock. He relishes a fight to the finish with an opponent and is not above relying on underhanded tactics when necessary. Sideswipe's arms act as powerful pile drivers, and he can fly for up to two minutes with his detachable rocket backpack, which can also be lent to other Autobots, including Optimus Prime. His rash actions often lead to self-injury, but he takes such things in stride. Fires flares visible for 18 miles.
| Ratchet | 1980 Nissan Vanette ambulance | More Than Meets the Eye (Part 1) | Killed by Starscream in The Transformers: The Movie. | Don Messick, Wally Burr ("Masquerade" episode only) | Dead |
Ratchet was the best tool-and-die man on Cybertron and is the Autobots' chief medical officer. In his workbay on Earth, he can make anything from a pin to a missile, and he has demonstrated the ability to return injured Autobots from near-death to working order so long as he has the right parts. Has laser scalpels, arc-welders, electron microscopes, circuit sensors, and fluid dispensers at his disposal. Ratchet likes to party, though sometimes his having a good time interferes with his effectiveness; later adaptations have sometimes inverted his demeanor, depicting him instead as more of a grumpy doctor type who likes to sarcastically back-talk his patients.
| Ironhide | 1980 Nissan Vanette | More Than Meets the Eye (Part 1) | The Transformers: The Movie (Killed by Megatron offscreen with a point-blank blast to the head from his fusion cannon) | Peter Cullen | Dead |
"Go chew on a microchip" is Ironhide's slogan. Prefers action to words. Oldest, toughest, most battle-tested Autobot, and frequent bodyguard to Optimus Prime. In charge of guarding anything of importance. Gruff, but kind. Trithyllium-steel skin makes him nearly invulnerable to attack. Shoots a variety of liquids from supercooled nitrogen to superheated lead. Has a sonar, a radar, and a radio wave detector. Slowest and most resilient of the group.
| Skyfire | VF-1S Super Valkyrie, Cybertronian jet fighter | Fire in the Sky | Dark Awakening | Gregg Berger | Unknown, presumably dead |
Swiftest Autobot. Daring in battle. Believes victory will come via technological advancement. Uses twin scramjet modules and liquid hydrogen fuel tanks to escape Earth's gravity. Flies halfway around the world in 30 minutes. Carries four particle-beam cannons and heat-seeking photon missiles. Prone to mechanical failures due to advanced technology. He and Starscream were scientists who had left Cybertron to explore a prehistoric earth, where he got lost during a windstorm and became separated from Starscream and crashed into the earth's icy surface, where he remains frozen for four million years. He was discovered frozen in the ice by Decepticon Rumble and Starscream four million years later and was reactivated by the Decepticons. He originally joined the Decepticons, but soon became an Autobot after he discovered that the Decepticons were indeed evil. Skyfire was among the fleet avenging the falsely reported deaths of the Autobots by Optimus Prime in Dark Awakening. He was shot down by the Quintessons and never seen again.
| Blaster | Boombox | Dinobot Island (Part 1) | The return of Optimus Prime (part 2) | Buster Jones | Alive (Reformed as Twincast in Headmasters) |
He loves to talk in rhythm and beat and rarely has a bad attitude. Blaster is the nemesis of Soundwave. He won't stop recording good beats, even if everyone else (except Jazz) asks him to stop. Has speakers on his legs that can produce sound waves to destabilize others, most noticeably Soundwave.
| Perceptor | Simple Microscope | Dinobot Island (Part 2) | The Face of Nijika | Paul Eiding | Alive |
He is one of the scientists for the Autobots. Seemingly not taken seriously by others. In microscope mode, he can see as far as deep space and can see some of the smallest objects naked to the Autobot eye. In bot mode, he has a built-in laser cannon. He has much dignity and is considered one of the smartest of the Autobots.: Note: Perceptor has a second alt-mode featured in the toyline, such as transforming into a tank or cannon.
| Hot Rod/Rodimus Prime | Hot Rod: Futuristic sports car Rodimus Prime: futuristic truck | The Transformers: The Movie | Last appeared as Rodimus Prime in The Return of Optimus Prime (Part 2) and last appeared as Hot Rod in The Rebirth (Part 3) | Dick Gautier (TV series), Judd Nelson (movie), and Ted Schwartz (Rodimus Prime in "Five Faces of Darkness") | Alive (Becomes Rodimus Prime in Headmasters) |
Hot Rod who is now known as Rodimus Prime is an all-American-boy Autobot. He is a typical adolescent who dreams of being heroic and important. He tends to follow rules too closely. Although he means well, Hot Rod's impulsive actions often get him into trouble. He carries two photon lasers that temporarily electromagnetize an enemy robot's microcircuits. Speed: 120 mph. Range: 4 miles. He can be hotheaded, but he is always a well-meaning, admirable lad and a brave and honorable fighter. As Rodimus Prime, he is the vanguard for the Autobot ranks. Possesses acute military prowess. Speaks with the savvy of a seasoned veteran. Expert tactician with exceptional maneuverability in battle. Has a tendency to act first and ask questions later. In robot mode, it carries a photon eliminator that shoots high-voltage electricity. Range: 500 miles. Speed: 200 mph. The sole purpose is to protect all life. His only weakness is his compassion for other living creatures. As a Targetmaster, Hot Rod often goes off on his own adventure with Firebolt, his electrostatic discharger rifle, who led a quiet scholarly life as Nebulan's top atomic physics scientist until he became the thrill-seeking Hot Rod's partner. Firebolt is excited, but nervous, about the prospect. In, "Transformers Headmasters", Hot Rod became Rodimus Prime again. After Cybertron was destroyed, Rodimus left with Kup and Blurr to find a new home for the Autobots, making Fortress Maximus the new supreme commander of the Autobots.
| Springer | Cybertronian Helicopter/Cybertronian armored car | The Transformers: The Movie | The Burden Hardest to Bear | Neil Ross | Alive |
A wise-cracking, sharp-witted adventurer, and is a triple changer. Powerful Autobot fighter with a massive physique and an easy-going manner. Possesses incredible "springing" power in his legs. Travels long distances with a pogo-like motion. In robot mode, it carries a laser that produces giant wind tunnels. Helicopter blade transforms into a light saber that can cut through concrete. Optimistic and good-humored.
| Kup | Cybertronian pickup truck | The Transformers: The Movie | The Rebirth (Part 3) | Lionel Stander (movie), John Stephenson (TV series) | Alive |
Kup is an old veteran warhorse with a thousand tall tales from his ten thousand adventures. He has a motto or word of advice for any situation, and he is as brave and loyal as they come. In robot mode, he carries an old-style musket laser that shoots short bursts of metal-corrosive hydrochloric acid. Range: 5 miles. Speed: 100 mph. Kup sees himself as a seasoned campaigner with more knowledge and experience to share. Other Autobots are not always receptive to his advice. As a Targetmaster, he is binary-bonded to Recoil, an old-style musket laser and former all-world prismaball player. In "Transformers: The Headmasters", Kup and Blurr left with Rodimus Prime to find a new home for the Autobots after Cybertron was destroyed.
| Ultra Magnus | 1986 Mack car carrier | Scramble City | The Rebirth (Part 3) | Robert Stack (film), Jack Angel (TV series) | Alive (Died in the Headmaster's) |
Ultra Magnus is all soldier. Most comfortable when carrying out Optimus Prime's orders. Possesses magnificent fighting skills, courage, and a gift for battlefield improvisation. Uncomfortable in the mantle of leadership, but presents a strong profile as a commander. Carries missile launchers capable of hitting a target 30 miles away. Resolute, fair, and courageous beyond reproach. Ever ready to sacrifice himself for the good of men and mission. Ultra Magnus was chosen to lead the Autobots by Optimus Prime. In the third season, Ultra Magnus became second-in-command of the Autobots and an advisor for Rodimus Prime. In the "Headmasters" series, Ultra Magnus was killed by Sixshot.
| Blurr | Cybertronian Hover Car | The Transformers: The Movie | The Rebirth (Part 3) | John Moschitta Jr. | Alive |
Blurr is the fastest Autobot on land and a superior messenger. He can quickly whisk information from one place to another. In robot mode, he carries an electro-laser that reverses the polarity of an enemy robot's microcircuits and leaves them motionless. Range: 10 miles. In vehicular mode, he can travel faster than the speed of sound, leaving a blurred image in his trail. As a Targetmaster, he is paired with Haywire, an excitable Nebulan teenager whose impulsiveness makes him a chancy electro-laser cannon, at best. In "Transformers: The Headmasters", Blurr and Kup left with Rodimus Prime to find a new home for the Autobots after Cybertron was destroyed.
| Arcee | Cybertronian convertible | The Transformers: The Movie | The Rebirth (Part 3) | Susan Blu | Alive |
Arcee is the only female Transformer to appear regularly. She was created in an effort by the film's producers to do something for the female fans, as Ron Friedman's daughter was such a fan and would like a female Transformer in the cast. She is a tough warrior and has a close bond with Daniel Witwicky, acting as a surrogate mother. She eventually becomes a Headmaster with Daniel (in an Exo-suit) forming her head. Although she has been paired with Springer (for most of Season 3), Chromedome (2 episodes of the second half of Headmasters), and Brainstorm (most of the second half of Headmasters), she seems to be more attached to Hot Rod/Rodimus Prime (in the Movie and Dark Awakening and the first half of Headmasters).: Note: Arcee would acquire an Earth vehicle mode in later adaptations, mainly a motorcycle.
| Wheelie | Cybertronian car | The Transformers: The Movie | The Return of Optimus Prime (Part 2) | Frank Welker | Alive |
Wheelie is the sole survivor from a party of intergalactic colonists who crash landed on Earth. He is a barbaric little savage who managed to stay alive by cunning, stealth, and fearlessness. Speaks in odd rhyming sentences and despises the Decepticons. Fights only when he is under attack and has to defend himself. Is a staunch friend to the Dinobots and a reliable ally for Hot Rod and Kup.

=== Autobot cars ===
| Name | Alternate mode | First and last appearances | | Portrayal | Status |
|---|---|---|---|---|---|
| Hound | 1953 Mitsubishi J59 military Jeep | More Than Meets the Eye (Part 1) | The Transformers: The Movie. Later appeared in Transformers: Headmasters. | Ken Sansom | Alive |
Hound loves the natural wonders of Earth, prefers it to Cybertron. Brave, fearless, loyal. Secretly desires to be human. Uses turret gun as radar scope, infrared radiation collector. Tracks machines as well as humans. Hologram gun projects 3-dimensional grid laser-light topographical maps. Use of his holograms often fool the Decepticons, which helps the Autobot cause. Vulnerable to thermal and electromagnetic interference.
| Mirage | 1979 Ligier JS11 Formula 1 car | More Than Meets the Eye (Part 1) | Masquerade | Frank Welker | Unknown |
Mirage is not thrilled about being an Autobot freedom fighter. He prefers hunting turbofoxes on Cybertron with his high-priced friends. He is an effective fighter and an even more effective intelligence gatherer. His electro-disrupter can cast illusions altering his physical placement and appearance for up to 6 minutes. Can become invisible so he can trick the Decepticons and achieve what he needs to do. Expert marksman with armor-piercing rocket-dart hunting rifle. He last appears in a late Season 2 episode, leaving his canon fate unknown; unused storyboards depict him defending Autobot City against the Decepticons in The Transformers: The Movie, with production notes indicating he is hit by a powerful blast unleashed by Megatron himself.
| Trailbreaker | 1985 Toyota 4WD Hilux | Appears in More Than Meets the Eye (Part 1). First speaks in More Than Meets the Eye (Part 2). | Cosmic Rust | Frank Welker | Unknown |
Trailbreaker makes light of any situation, no matter how serious. A practical joker and cheerleader, but considers himself a liability to Autobots, since he consumes the most fuel. Lacks self-esteem and often asks to be left behind. Projects nearly impenetrable invisible energy force-field. Can jam radio transmissions. Very slow. Often mopes about his handicaps, but his bravery and defensive prowess is unquestioned. The use of his energy force-fields often helps the Autobots, when they are in danger.
| Sunstreaker | 1974 super-tuned Lamborghini Countach LP500S | Appears in More Than Meets the Eye (Part 1). First speaks in More Than Meets the Eye (Part 2). | The Transformers: The Movie. Later appeared in Transformers: Headmasters (In Japan). | Corey Burton | Alive |
The complete egotist, Sunstreaker thinks that he is the most beautiful thing on Earth. Loves his sleek styling, contemptuous of other Autobot race cars. Fires laser-guided ground-to-air rockets and high energy electron pulses at 300 bursts/sec. Tough polymer-steel skin resists artillery. Not a team player. Can be baited into dangerous situations, but is a very calm, competent and ruthless war machine.
| Bluestreak | 1980 Nissan 280ZX | Appears in More Than Meets the Eye (Part 1). First speaks in More Than Meets the Eye (Part 3). | He was last seen helping Kup put up the barricades in The Transformers: The Movie. It is unknown whether or not he made it back to Autobot City in time. | Casey Kasem | Unknown |
Bluestreak often talks incessantly and inanely. Lightens the situation for all Autobots with his good-natured manner. Despite formidable weaponry and blazing speed, he hates war. Haunted by memory of Decepticons destroying his home-city. Fires bombs up to 8.3 miles and lightning-like 80,000 volt beam up to 12 miles of limited accuracy. Often inhibited by his disdain for combat. Bluestreak takes the form of a modified 1980 Nissan 280ZX, the year can be identified by the use of a T-bar roof and he is naturally aspirated because of the design of his wheels.
| Tracks | 1982 Chevrolet Corvette Stingray | Appears in Dinobot Island (Part 1). First speaks in Dinobot Island (Part 2). | "Scramble City". Survived the battle of Autobot City in The Transformers: The Movie, but it did not make final cut. Later appeared in Transformers: Headmasters. | Michael McConnohie | Alive |
Called "lousy Earth-lover" by some fellow Autobots because he prefers sleek Earth car form to original robot form. Thinks they are jealous of his good looks, but they feel struggle against Decepticons should be his top concern. Tracks uses wings under rear fenders for sub-sonic flight. As car or robot uses launcher to fire heat-seeking incendiary missiles 60 miles. Has blinding black beam gun.
| Grapple | 1951 Mitsubishi Fuso crane truck | Appears in Dinobot Island (Part 1). First speaks in The Master Builders. | Seen briefly in The Transformers: The Movie | Peter Renaday | Unknown |
On Cybertron his buildings are considered works of art; on Earth, his ideas are limited by war. Takes pride in his work, prone to severe depression if they're destroyed in battle. As crane can lift up to a 35-ton object and position it with precision and grace. As robot has high-temperature arc-welder rifle and can launch rockets 4.5 miles from wrist sockets. Prone to breakdown in vehicle mode.
| Red Alert | Lamborghini Countach LP500S | Dinobot Island (Part 1) | The Revenge of Bruticus | Michael Chain | Alive |
Paranoia makes him good at his job; nothing escapes his notice, no matter how small. When his sensors are activated, thinks trouble is coming. Red Alert can trigger alarms in other Autobots and has excellent sensory perception. He carries a 25-mile range rocket launcher and particle beam rifle. Red Alert is prone to rash judgements which can lead to injury to himself and comrades. He is killed by the Constructicons in an unused The Transformers: The Movie storyboard but seemingly survives in the final product.
| Smokescreen | Datsun 280ZX Turbo | Appears in Dinobot Island (Part 1). First speaks in The Master Builder. | Scramble City | Jack Angel | Alive |
Whether engaged in raging battle or friendly conversation, an ulterior purpose usually exists. Job is to lead enemy astray. Sneaky, but charming and affable, Smokescreen is considered most devious yet most trusted of Autobots. In robot mode, Smokescreen shoots missiles which wreak havoc on enemy aircraft radar and guidance systems. He also wields a electro-disrupter rifle that shorts out electrical targets.
| Hoist | 1984 Toyota 4WD Hilux tow truck | Dinobot Island Part 1 | Scramble City | Michael Chain | Unknown |
All Autobots submit to Hoist's maintenance schedule to operate at peak efficiency in battle. Jovial, enjoys his job and is good at it – will find any problem, from engine overhaul to smallest leaky gasket. As tow truck, hauls 40,000 lbs. As a robot, he launches heat-seeking missiles from wrist sockets. Full spectrum multi-sensor behind his head determines an object's composition, density, tensile strength, energy properties.
| Inferno | 1955 Mitsubishi Fuso fire truck | Dinobots Island Part 1 | Scramble City | Walker Edmiston | Alive |
Often distracted from performing his job to engage in combat. Can do anything Earth fire trucks can in vehicular mode. Inferno's ceramic-plated armored skin can take up to 8000 degrees Celsius. Extinguisher rifle shoots flame-suppressing foam and an energy damping beam to counter other beams. Forearms shoot missiles. Does not follow orders well, not very mobile as a robot.
| Skids | Honda City Turbo mini van | Quest for Survival | Triple Takeover | Michael Chain (in "Quest for Survival"), Dan Gilvezan (in "Triple Takeover") | Unknown |
A daydreamer, Skids often bumps into things at 60 mph while pondering Earth life instead of a Decepticon attack. Considers Earth one vast lab for his research. His findings are often invaluable to fellow Autobots. Enormous memory storage capacity. Carries a liquid nitrogen rifle with 600 foot range. Twin electron blaster of 20,000 volts can short-circuit almost anything. At 560 mph can stop within 25 feet.

=== Mini-Bots ===
| Name | Alternate mode | First and last appearances | | Voiced by | Status |
|---|---|---|---|---|---|
| Windcharger | 1984 Pontiac Trans-Am | Appears in More Than Meets the Eye (Part 1). First speaks in S.O.S. Dinobots. | Was found dead by Arcee in The Transformers: The Movie. | John Stephenson, Terry McGovern (in "The Masquerade") | Dead |
Windcharger is the fastest Autobot over short distances. Good in situations requiring fast, decisive action. Enthusiastic, but impatient. Short attention span. Casts powerful magnetic fields which can attract or repel large metal objects. Smashes them at closer distances. These abilities use up tremendous energy. Often burns himself out due to carelessness.
| Brawn | Series III Land Rover | Appears in More Than Meets the Eye (Part 1). First speaks in More Than Meets the Eye (Part 2). | Shot by Starscream in The Transformers: The Movie, but shown alive in season 3 episode Carnage in C Minor | Corey Burton | Dead (Presumably) |
To Brawn, Earth is essentially a hostile environment – and he loves it. Strong, rugged, agile – the most macho of all Autobots. Delights in challenges. Sorry for those not as tough as himself. Second strongest Autobot – can lift 190,000 pounds and knock down a small building with one punch. High resistance to artillery fire. Vulnerable to attack by electromagnetic waves. There is some debate regarding Brawn's ultimate fate. Storyboards for The Transformers: The Movie depict Brawn being shot through the chest by Starscream, but this was changed to his left shoulder in the final product for unknown reasons; Brawn survived an identical wound in the three-part season 1 episode The Ultimate Doom. Brawn's name is also curiously excluded from the list of fallen Autobots in the season 3 episode Dark Awakening, and he cameos in the season 3 episode Carnage in C Minor in a non-speaking role, although Carnage in C Minor contains numerous animation errors, including the clearly-dead Huffer's appearance. Meanwhile, in the real world, Brawn's toy was retired and replaced by Outback, and he would not appear in promotional material, but he was described as merely "discarded" in Japanese-only supplemental material when a time traveling Wheeljack came across it despite nearby Autobots Ironhide and Ratchet being explicitly described as "dead" within the same sentence.
| Huffer | Volvo F88 single axle cab-over | Appears in More Than Meets the Eye (Part 1). First speaks in More Than Meets the Eye (Part 2). | Transformers: The Movie. He was last seen helping Kup put up barricades in the film. He received offscreen damage and was mentioned as dead by Daniel Witwicky in Dark Awakening. | John Stephenson | Dead |
Huffer is cynical, hard-boiled and pessimistic. "He looks at the world through sludge-colored windshields." Will complain it cannot be built, then builds it anyway. Not too sociable, but absolutely reliable. Arm sensors can test materials for strength, heat resistance, elasticity, etc. Extremely strong. Superior mathematical and geometrical abilities. Often unhappy and homesick for Cybertron.
| Gears | 4WD off-road Chevrolet S-10 pickup truck | Appears in More Than Meets the Eye (Part 1). First speaks in More Than Meets the Eye (Part 2). | The Transformers: The Movie, it is possible he was killed when Unicron attacked Moonbase 1, but nothing official was ever said. | Don Messick | Unknown |
Gears is anti-social, a self-proclaimed misfit. Finds fault in everything and everyone. Acts this way to help cheer others up as they try to cheer him up. Tremendous strength and endurance. Totes heavy loads long distances. Launches to height of 20 miles, floats down on compressed air. Becomes an easy target due to limited maneuverability. Can detect infrared.
| Warpath | M551 Sheridan tank | A Prime Problem | Ghost in the Machine | Alan Oppenheimer | Alive |
Warpath thinks he is more impressive than his comrades do, and likes to show off his sharpshooting. He is boisterous, vain, and upset by even the smallest damage to his gun barrel. Can go 30 mph over roughest terrain, hit a hex-nut 1.5 miles away. Shoots explosives, thermal, cryogenic, acid, sonic shells. Great strength, but helpless if upended.
| Seaspray | Hovercraft | Dinobot Island (Part 2) | Thief in the Night | Alan Oppenheimer, Wally Burr (PSA) | Alive |
Displays a zest for his job unmatched by fellow Autobots. Seaspray loves the ocean and its creatures, and is unhappy when on land. Can go 120 knots, 4000-mile range. Seaspray has sonar radar and underwater and surface-to-air lasers, also used in robot mode.
| Powerglide | A-10 Thunderbolt II | Dinobot Island (Part 1) | Ghost in the Machine | Michael Chain | Alive |
Powerglide is showy and proud that he is one of the few Autobots who can fly. He is highly agile and usually travels at around 500 mph, but can increase his power output and speed to 3200 mph for short periods.
| Beachcomber | 1982 M1040 Chenowth "Hellfire" fast attack vehicle | The Insecticon Syndrome | Five Faces of Darkness (Part 5) | Alan Oppenheimer | Alive |
No interest in warfare; prefers long, lone trips into deserts and along coasts. Beachcomber is cool-headed, low-key, and personable – what Earthlings call "laid-back". Beachcomber can travel over rugged terrain and use his sensors to determine chemical composition of land and find needed resources.
| Cosmos | Flying saucer | Megatron's Master Plan (Part 2) | Grimlock's New Brain | Michael McConnohie | Alive |
Cosmos relieves boredom by scaring humans by hovering over their backyards at night or zig-zagging through meteor showers. He can achieve Earth orbit, and even travel to the Moon and back with enough fuel. Cosmos' optical sensors can see a bicycle at 600 miles. Cosmos also wields a high-accuracy particle beam.
| Outback | Series III Land Rover | Five Faces of Darkness (Part 1) | The Quintesson Journal | Dan Gilvezan (in "Five Faces of Darkness"), Gregg Berger (in "The Quintesson Journal") | Alive |
Thinks going by the book is going the long way. Does not follow plans – or roads. Cuts across parking lots, sidewalks, backyards to get where he is going. Travels at 110 mph, range 800 miles, his four-wheel drive handles roughest terrain, climbs grades up to 50 degrees. Carries turret-mounted mortar cannon that shoots armour-piercing shells.
| Pipes | Volvo F88 single axle cab-over | Five Faces of Darkness (Part 5) | Forever Is a Long Time Coming | Hal Rayle | Alive |
Fascinated by seemingly worthless Earth gadgetry – carrot juicers, musical wrist-watches, electrical hair combers, etc. Collects them in unused corner of Ark, creating a mini museum of American consumerism. Travels at 100 mph, range 400 miles, hauls up to 60 tons. Twin exhaust pipes emit corrosive gases that can dissolve a 2" thick steel slab in 10 minutes.
| Swerve | 4WD off-road Chevrolet S-10 pickup truck | Five Faces of Darkness (Part 5) | Forever Is a Long Time Coming | N/A | Alive |
A menace on highways. Does not pay attention to where he is going or the orders he is being given – easily distracted by anything. Hands' sensors can determine physical and chemical properties of metals. Goes 120 mph, range 500 miles in car mode. Gets into many accidents.
| Tailgate | 1986 Pontiac Trans Am | Five Faces of Darkness (Part 5) | | Ted Schwartz | Alive |
He sometimes has his mind stuck in low gear, believes 55 mph speed limit is an infringement on the rights of cars. Garages are prisons to him, and he does not understand that Earth machines are not alive. Goes 180 mph, range 600 miles. Uses ferrocobalt magnet under his hood to be pulled by and within a few feet of other vehicles, reducing his fuel use to near zero. Prone to overheating.

=== Autobot Cities ===
The Autobot Cities are Transformers who can have alt-modes of cities, or simply giant, protective buildings. In most media, they are referred to as Titans of a long, forgotten past. Metroplex (Triple Changer - Robot, Battle Station, City)

=== Dinobots ===
The Dinobots are a faction of Autobots who have dinosaur alternate modes. The first dinosaur robots were conceived by designers at Takara as a line of Dino Robo toys in 1983. After being reconceived by writers in the United States and assembled as a team, the first three Dinobots appeared in the episode "S.O.S. Dinobots" of the Transformers cartoon series, while the latter two were created in "War of the Dinobots". In the Transformers cartoon series Power of the Primes, they merge into the combiner Volcanicus.

| Name | Alternate mode | First and last appearances | | Voiced by | Status |
|---|---|---|---|---|---|
| Grimlock | Tyrannosaurus | Created by Wheeljack and Ratchet in S.O.S. Dinobots | Call of the Primitives | Gregg Berger | Alive |
The leader of the Dinobots, the only Dinobot whose name does not start with the letter S. Of all the Dinobots, he is the most fearsome and powerful. Although dedicated to the Autobot cause, he resents authority. Cold, merciless, but a valiant warrior. Has contempt for the weak, including all humans. Great strength, uses jaws to break almost anything in two. Carries energon sword and galaxial rocket launcher in robot mode. Other than arrogance and lack of speed, has no real weakness.
| Slag | Triceratops | Created by Wheeljack and Ratchet in S.O.S. Dinobots | Call of the Primitives | Neil Ross | Alive |
Enjoys melting enemies into pools of liquid metal. Like his fellow Dinobots, resents authority. Does not take any orders that do not come from Grimlock. Disruptive – often brawls with comrades. Shoots 3000 degrees Celsius flame up to 80 feet from mouth. Enormous strength – can shatter a brick building with head. Uses electron blaster in robot mode. Rash, not too bright. Nasty, mean-spirited; often the other Autobots will not help when he is in trouble.: Note: Slag was renamed as "Slug" in later adaptations due to how offensive the word is in the United Kingdom.
| Sludge | Brontosaurus | Created by Wheeljack and Ratchet in S.O.S. Dinobots | Call of the Primitives | Frank Welker | Alive |
Likes to make presence known – a footstep can be heard and felt in a 3-mile radius. Gentle and shy, but terrifying and unstoppable in battle. Like other Dinobots, dislikes authority. Can exert 40,000 psi via feet – enough to shatter a bridge. Immense strength and endurance. Adept at fighting in water, swamp, and jungle. Slow, not too clever – often victim of the calamities he causes.
| Snarl | Stegosaurus | Created by Wheeljack and Ratchet in War of the Dinobots | Call of the Primitives | Hal Rayle | Alive |
An unhappy loner of few words and fewer opinions, Snarl finds joy only in battle. He hates his Dinobot form and longs to return to Cybertron. Snarl's Stegosaurus form possesses a durable hide, a powerful tail, and large spinal plates that absorb sunlight.
| Swoop | Pteranodon | Created by Wheeljack and Ratchet in War of the Dinobots | Call of the Primitives | Michael Bell | Alive |
Swoop is the friendliest of the Dinobots, but is equally ferocious and considers spreading fear his greatest weapon. Swoop has missile launcher under each wing that fire missiles equivalent of 5000 pounds. As robot, uses launchers and 4000 degrees Celsius thermal sword.

=== Aerialbots ===
The Aerialbots are a faction of Autobots who were created from Earth-style aircraft by Vector Sigma following Alpha Trion's sacrifice. They are the Autobots' first combiners faction. They combine to form Superion.

| Name | Alternate mode | First and last appearances | | Voiced by | Status |
|---|---|---|---|---|---|
| Silverbolt | Concorde | Created by the Autobots in The Key to Vector Sigma (Part 2) | Was wounded by Sixshot in The Rebirth (Part 1) and temporarily rebuilt into engines to move Cybertron in The Rebirth (Part 3) | Charlie Adler | Alive |
The leader of The Aerialbots. Scared of heights. Brave, grimly determined warrior, but he struggles to maintain that image to hide his phobia. Was selected by Optimus Prime to command so he'd be too busy worrying about others to worry about himself. In jet mode, speed of Mach 1.9, range 4500 miles. Carries electrostatic battery that releases bolt of up to 150,000 volts through his nose cone. Uses electrostatic discharger rifle in robot mode. Appeared back in his robot mode leading his fellow Aerialbots in Headmasters after he was temporarily rebuilt into Cybertron engines in The Rebirth (Part 1).
| Air Raid | 1973 F-15 Eagle | Created by the Autobots in The Key to Vector Sigma (Part 2) | Was wounded by Sixshot in The Rebirth (Part 1) and temporarily rebuilt into engines to move Cybertron in The Rebirth (Part 2) | Rob Paulsen | Alive |
Air Raid is fearless and prefers streaking into a cluster of Decepticons to shooting at them from long range. Flies at Mach 2.5, range 1500 miles. Carries air-to-air heat-seeking missiles, uses torque rifle whose beam applies 80,000 psi of rotational force. Appeared fully restored to his robot form fighting alongside his fellow Aerialbots in Headmasters after he was temporary rebuilt into Cybertron engines in The Rebirth (Part 1).
| Slingshot | Harrier jump jet | Created by the Autobots in The Key to Vector Sigma (Part 2) | Was wounded by Sixshot in The Rebirth (Part 1) and temporarily rebuilt into engines to move Cybertron in The Rebirth (Part 2) | Rob Paulsen | Alive |
He will not ever win a Mr. Popularity contest – incessant braggart, takes credit for exploits of other Autobots. Optimus Prime is supportive since he is hard-working and loyal, but he secretly lacks self-confidence. Vertical-take-off-and-landing aircraft, flies at Mach 1.6, range 800 miles, extremely maneuverable. Sharpshooter – has twin mortar cannons as jet, neutron rifle as robot. Appeared once again completely back in robot mode with the other Aerialbots in Headmasters.
| Skydive | 1977 F-16 | Created by the Autobots in The Key to Vector Sigma (Part 2) | Was wounded by Sixshot in The Rebirth (Part 1) and temporarily rebuilt into engines to move Cybertron in The Rebirth (Part 2) | Laurie Faso | Alive |
Skydive is fascinated by the science of aerial warfare. Can, within the limits of his design, duplicate the flying motion of anything he sees. Flies at Mach 2.6, range 1400 miles. Carries laser guided missiles and uses nega-gun that crumbles objects by breaking molecular bonds.
| Fireflight | F-4 Phantom | Created by the Autobots in The Key to Vector Sigma (Part 2) | Was wounded by Sixshot in The Rebirth (Part 1) and temporarily rebuilt into engines to move Cybertron in The Rebirth (Part 3) | Jeff Mackay | Alive |
Fireflight often does not pay attention to where he is going since he is too busy marveling at scenery. Flies at Mach 2.0, range 1000 miles. Carries flammable "fire-fog" missiles, uses photon displacer gun that affects sight by distorting light waves. The other Aerialbots as well as him appeared completely rebuilt to the robot modes in Headmasters.
| Superion | The 5 Aerialbots | The Key to Vector Sigma (Part 2) | The Return of Optimus Prime (Part 1) | Ed Gilbert, Frank Welker (in "The Key to Vector Sigma" Pt. 2) | Alive |
A fierce and frightful fighting machine. Suppresses thought of the five Aerialbots who comprise him, directs his thinking to one purpose: destruction of Decepticons. Cold, aloof. Flies at 800 mph, range 5800 miles. Can demolish a battleship with one blow. Uses electrostatic discharger rifle. Difficult for him to adapt to new situations or be innovative due to limited mental functions. The five fully restored Aerialbots once again merged to form him in Headmasters.

=== Protectobots ===
The Protectobots are an Autobot faction and the second of their combiner faction who are charged with protecting the humans, rescuing them, and enforcing the law. They combine to form Defensor.

| Name | Alternate mode | First and Last appearances | | Voiced by | Status |
|---|---|---|---|---|---|
| Hotspot | Mitsubishi Fuso fire truck | First appeared in The Revenge of Bruticus. First spoke in B.O.T. | The Rebirth (Part 3) | Dan Gilvezan | Alive |
The leader of the Protectobots who likes to be where the action is. His fire truck hose shoots high-pressure water 1200 feet. As robot, can press 60,000 pounds, uses fireball cannons that shoot bursts of 2000 degrees F. blue flame 1.5 miles.
| Streetwise | Nissan 300ZX Z31 police car | The Revenge of Bruticus | The Rebirth (Part 3) | Peter Cullen | Alive |
Also known as "Streetstar" and "Streetsmart". Nothing escapes his notice; he has an amazing capacity to adapt to understand his environment. Clever and determined – nothing deters him from seeking his prey – except an empty fuel tank. As car, has powerful double-mounted air-compressor cannon with 50 mile range; as robot uses blinding photon pistol. Sometimes overheats as car.
| Groove | Harley Davidson Tour Glide motorcycle | The Revenge of Bruticus | The Rebirth (Part 3) | Frank Welker | Alive |
A full tank, clear skies, open road – that's all he wants out of life. Relaxed, easy going, happy wherever he is. Pacifist – difficult for him to accept his role as part of the Protectobot team. Speed: 140 mph, range: 800 miles. Uses twin vaporators, which shoot mists of oxidizing, freezing, and corrosive liquids; and photon pistol.
| First Aid | Toyota Hiace | First appeared in The Revenge of Bruticus. First spoke in Surprise Party. | The Rebirth (Part 3) | Michael Bell | Alive |
Hates seeing any machine in pain – even those who do not know it, like a broken street lamp or an overheated car. Compassionate, cautious – will restrict an Autobot to repair bay for faulty directional signal. Carries dual-barrelled decrystallizer cannon – weakens metal by disrupting crystal-line structure – and photon pistol. Fists shoot laser beams used for welding in surgery.
| Blades | Bell 204 helicopter | The Revenge of Bruticus | The Rebirth (Part 3) | Frank Welker | Alive |
Basically a street fighter – prefers using rotor blades for slashing Decepticons rather than for flying. Considers long-range air attacks unsporting, cowardly. Maximum speed: 400 mph; range: 1200 miles. Twin launchers fire "smart" rockets that seek targets based on encoded computer images. Uses photon pistol.
| Defensor | The 5 Protectobots | B.O.T. | The Return of Optimus Prime (Part 1) | Christopher Collins | Alive |
Views humans as if they were his own children – will expend his last drop of fuel to protect them. Seeks human friendship, but humans fear his hulking, mechanical form. Can lift 300,000 pounds with one hand. Impervious to most artillery, can surround himself with force field for brief periods. Defensor wields a fireball cannon that shoots 2,000 degree bursts of blue fire.

=== Female Autobots ===
There are some Female Autobots in the group, who had never left Cybertron.

| Name | Alternate mode | First and Last appearances | | Voiced by | Status |
|---|---|---|---|---|---|
| Ariel/Elita One | Cybertronian car | The Search for Alpha Trion | War Dawn (Ariel) | Marlene Aragon and Samantha Newark (Ariel) | Unknown |
She was formerly known as Ariel and became Elita One after being rebuilt by Alpha Trion from being damaged by Megatron during the golden age of cybertron. Elita is a devoted Autobot, powerful warrior, and leader of the Female Autobots, fearless in the face of the enemy, but compassionate to those who need her help. She has a special power that allows her to freeze time for as long as her body can sustain it. She is the significant other of Optimus Prime, going back to when they were Ariel and Orion.
| Chromia | Cybertronian van | The Search for Alpha Trion | | Linda Gary | Unknown |
Chromia is a soldier under the command of Elita One and seems to function as a second-in-command for her, leading the rest of the team when Elita's not around. She is brave, hard as nails and, not surprisingly, in a relationship with Ironhide. She has also taken over from Firestar as Flareup's mentor when the latter turned out to be better suited to more offense-oriented tasks.
| Firestar | Cybertronian truck | The Search for Alpha Trion | | Morgan Lofting | Unknown |
Firestar is one of the members of Elita One's Autobot resistance and specialized in rescue missions. Practical and unprepossessing, she is nonetheless particularly useful during thefts of Decepticon Energon cubes, as her vehicle mode is capable of transporting large numbers of them, Firestar is a close friend of Inferno and Chromia, and entrusted the safety of her protégé Flareup to the latter.
| Greenlight | Cybertronian truck | The Search for Alpha Trion | | Unknown | Unknown |
Greenlight is one of the female Autobots who were first seen among female leader Elita One who had gone into hiding from the Decepticons of Cybertron. Four million years earlier she and her fellow female Autobots tried to board the Ark with the male Autobots who were leaving their home planet in search for energon, but were unable to do so.
| Lancer | Cybertronian truck | The Search for Alpha Trion | | Unknown | Unknown |
Lancer is a member of the Elita One's Autobot resistance. She was holding a clipboard within the team's secret underground headquarters when Chromia and her team returned from their energy-stealing mission. Later, when their headquarters was located and destroyed, she and Greenlight freed Moonracer from the debris. Sticking with the rest of the team, she did her share in the fight against the Decepticons and could again later be seen manning a series of monitors in the team's new base.
| Lifeline | Cybertronian Convertible | Fight or Flee | | N/A | Alive |
Lifeline is a paradron medic who has the same design as Autobot Arcee except having a pattern of different colours. She is dedicated to helping those who are hurt.
| Moonracer | Cybertronian car | The Search for Alpha Trion | | Morgan Lofting | Unknown |
Amongst her colleagues, Moonracer is the joy and the laughter. The bubbly little sister, Moonracer has much naïve optimism in it and, to the dismay of her partners-in-guerrilla warfare, pratfalls. She worries that others, either friends or enemies, do not take her seriously and dismiss her as simply being cute. But she will show them. She will show them she too can be hardcore, according to Powerglide, Moonracer is the best sharpshooter in the galaxy, according to herself, she is the best in the Universe.
| Beta | Unknown | Forever Is a Long Time Coming | | Susan Blu | Unknown |
Beta is one of the earliest known female Autobots, though the last to appear in the cartoon. She used to work with Alpha Trion back on Cybertron during the time of the Autobot's Rebellion against the Quintessons.
| The Cheesecake Robot | Unknown | Starscream's Ghost | | Unknown | Unknown |
The Cheesecake Robot is a pink Autobot who looks very much like Arcee. The exiled Decepticon Octane struggled to tune in to the robot's signal while his cargo ship was en route to Cybertron, succeeding just as a bomb planted by a Skuxxoid bounty hunter completely demolishes his ship, stranding him in space.

=== Technobots ===
The Technobots are an Autobot faction and the third combiner group. They were created by Grimlock at the time he had an intelligence boost and they act like scientists. They combine to form Computron.

| Name | Alternate mode | First and Last appearances | | Voiced by | Status |
|---|---|---|---|---|---|
| Scattershot | Jet Fighter/Cannon | Created by Grimlock in Grimlock's New Brain | The Rebirth (Part 3) | Stephen Keener | Alive |
The leader of the Technobots. A brawling, bragging berserker, he wades into a Decepticon patrol with all barrels blazing, does not stop until he is out of ammo. Calls those who disapprove of his methods 'tinplated bucketheads.' Rude, gruff, and direct. In vehicle and battle station modes, has electron pulse cannon in nosecone; array of sonic, thermal and artillery shell guns. In robot mode, has 500 rounds-per-minute automatic acid-pellet gun.
| Nosecone | Subterrene | Created by Grimlock in Grimlock's New Brain | The Rebirth (Part 3) | David Workman | Alive |
He makes enemy fortifications look like walls of Swiss cheese by the time he is finished with them. Slow and methodical – weathers artillery fire with the same calm he endures criticism of his apparent laziness. In vehicle mode, durabyllium – steel alloy drill can pierce almost any material; 2 rocket-propelled missiles use vidicon cameras to lock onto targets. In robot mode, has X-ray laser pistol.
| Lightspeed | Race Car | Created by Grimlock in Grimlock's New Brain | The Rebirth (Part 3) | Danny Mann | Alive |
He longs to be reconstructed into an interstellar spacecraft so he can explore the vast gulfs of space, feels he is a prisoner of gravity in his present form. In jet car mode, goes from 0 to 500 mph in eight seconds. Cruising speed: 300 mph. Has twin infra-red scope missile launchers. In robot mode has blinding light-burst gun.
| Strafe | Jet Fighter | Created by Grimlock in Grimlock's New Brain | The Rebirth (Part 3) | Steve Bulen | Alive |
He never looks at his targets before he shoots since he never aims—he just sprays artillery in all directions as soon as he arrives. High-strung, unnerved by quiet, expert marksman. Lightning fast reflexes. In vehicle mode, maximum ground speed: 250 mph; maximum air speed: 580 mph. Carries twin automatic light-pulse blasters. In robot mode, uses heat-ray rifle.
| Afterburner | Motorcycle | Created by Grimlock in Grimlock's New Brain | The Rebirth (Part 3) | Jim Cummings | Alive |
Quick to anger, even quicker to attack. Defiant, uncooperative, nasty tempered. Hates authority. In vehicle mode, uses solid rocket fuel packs to boost speed to 450 mph. Tyres secrete adhesive that enables him to drive up most walls. Carries two laser-guided incendiary missiles, rapid-fire plasma pulse cannon. In robot mode, uses semi-automatic sonic blaster pistol.
| Computron | The 5 Technobots | Grimlock's New Brain | The Return of Optimus Prime (Part 1) | Bert Kramer | Alive |
He always makes the right choice, but takes several minutes to make it, since he first completely analyzes input from the 5 Technobots who comprise him. They sometimes merge to figure out great tasks. Has great strength, equipped with data processing, communications, radar equipment. Uses Scattershot's automatic acid-pellet gun. Chooses his words with great care and precision—when Computron talks, everyone listens.

=== Throttlebots ===
The Throttlebots are an Autobot faction who are known for their speed and agility.

| Name | Alternate mode | First and Last appearances | | Voiced by | Status |
|---|---|---|---|---|---|
| Goldbug | 1976 VW Beetle | The Return of Optimus Prime (Part 2) | The Rebirth Part 3 | Dan Gilvezan | Alive |
The leader of the Throttlebots. After Bumblebee was badly damaged while fighting a hate-plague infected Superion, he was completely rebuilt as a Throttlebot by a Quintesson who was aiding the Autobots at the time. The newly brought back to life Optimus Prime gave Bumblebee his new name Goldbug, due to his new look after Bumblebee claimed that's what he felt he had become. As Goldbug, he still has the mind of the Autobot Bumblebee, but with a new, improved body. More serious, assertive, mature than he was. Realizes what others think of him is not nearly as important as what he thinks of himself. Excellent fuel efficiency; 2 1/2 times better than the next best Throttlebot. Adaptable to underwater, cold and hot environments. Can withstand temperatures from -150 to 180 degrees Fahrenheit.
| Chase | 1984 Ferrari Testarossa | The Return of Optimus Prime (Part 1) | The Rebirth (Part 3) | Rob Paulsen | Alive |
Impatient, overeager, usually ten miles down the road before other Throttlebots have shifted into gear. Likes to brag about past exploits and future conquests. Very popular. In car mode, can cruise at 240 mph. Excellent vision—can see long distances in three directions at the same time. Possesses an array of radar dishes positioned under roof in car mode. Prone to drive shaft and transmission problems.
| Freeway | 1984 Chevrolet Corvette | The Return of Optimus Prime Part 1 | The Rebirth Part 3 | Danny Mann | Alive |
The Throttlebot's self-appointed comedian. Specializes in insulting others, but gets angry when others make fun of him. His car radio intercepts and decodes enemy radio broadcasts, transmits erroneous ones instead. Uses sonic land mines, magnetic homing grenades, rusting agents, etc. for sabotage. At times he laughs so hard at his jokes he blows internal circuits and disables himself.
| Rollbar | Jeep Wrangler | The Return of Optimus Prime (Part 1) | The Rebirth (Part 1) | Dan Gilvezan | Alive |
Impulsive, loves to take chances, put his life on the line. Speaks in corny, macho cliches, which unintentionally elicits laughter from the other Throttlebots. Extremely agile in jeep mode; can go into flips and rolls with very little loss in speed. Has built-in chemical sensors, radiation detectors, audio and video recorders to assist his tracking.
| Searchlight | Ford RS200 | The Return of Optimus Prime (Part 1) | The Rebirth (Part 3) | Steve Bulen | Alive |
A creature of the night. Cruises the Earth with the curiosity of a cat. Nothing is too insignificant or irrelevant to escape his notice. Quiet, serious; a loner. Top row of headlights equipped with stereoscopic digital video cameras, spectroscopic chemical analyzer, and radiation detector. Bottom lights can produce strobe effect, full color spectrum with blinding 10,000 watt brightness.
| Wideload | Dump Truck | The Return of Optimus Prime (Part 1) | The Rebirth (Part 1) | Corey Burton | Alive |
Usually he is so dirty you'd think he sweated grease, but he is a neatness fanatic. Vain and superficial—judges others on appearances. Uses spare time to work on his polish. Can haul up to 1,000,000 pounds. Uses hands and tires' sensors to find new sources of raw materials. Unusually susceptible to rust, an embarrassment given his pride in his appearance.

=== Autobot Targetmasters ===
The Targetmasters are Transformers who can transform into Weapons. The ones on the Autobots' side were created by the Nebulans who they befriended.

| Name | Alternate mode | First and Last appearances | | Voiced by | Status |
|---|---|---|---|---|---|
| Sureshot | Race Car | The Rebirth (Part 1) | The Rebirth (Part 3) | Steve Bulen | Alive |
His confidence borders on arrogance—can hit targets blindfolded, from memory. Resents his twin laser cannon, Spoilsport, since he needs no help from Sureshot to shoot, and never asks for any. Spoilsport likes to shoot and show off on his own. The two only cooperate when their lives depend on it. In vehicle mode, Sureshot's maximum speed: 290 mph, range: 1200 miles.
| Pointblank | Cybertronian Sports Car | The Rebirth (Part 1) | The Rebirth (Part 3) | Neil Ross | Alive |
He is a somber, no-nonsense sort, weary from millions of years of war on Cybertron. Believes words can do more harm than weapons, so he has few to offer. Understands the reason for the Autobot-Nebulan alliance, but disapproves of it. Peacemaker, his stereophonic sonic blaster, is a Nebulan law enforcement official who's trying, but failing, to persuade Pointblank to be more accommodating.
| Crosshairs | Truck | The Rebirth (Part 1) | The Rebirth (Part 3) | Neil Ross | Alive |
Meticulous, cautious, some would say overcautious—will not take a shot unless he is sure he cannot miss, not wanting to waste ammo. Pinpointer, his dual rocket-propelled grenade launcher, can lock on target in less than .0003 seconds, but usually trusts Crosshairs to decide when to shoot. In vehicle mode, maximum speed: 160 mph, range: 750 miles; built for traversing rough terrain.

=== Autobot Headmasters ===
The Headmasters are transformers who are partnered with Nebulons in special robot suits that enable them to transform into the head of the Autobot.

| Name | Alternate mode | First and Last appearances | | Voiced by | Status |
|---|---|---|---|---|---|
| Hardhead | Tank | The Rebirth (Part 1) | The Rebirth (Part 3) | Stephen Keener | Alive |
The only way to get him to follow advice is to persuade him to come up with the idea himself. Stubborn, does not talk much. Binary-bonded to Duros, a Nebulan who loves a battle as much as he does. In tank mode, maximum speed: 155 mph. Range: 450 miles. Has 120MM laser-guided gun that shoots incendiary, sonic and explosive shells. In robot mode, has two shatter blasters that shoot diamond-hard shards.
| Chromedome | Car | The Rebirth (Part 1) | The Rebirth (Part 3) | Frank Welker | Alive |
Spent several thousand years crunching numbers at Cybertron's Institute for Higher Programming before a Decepticon attack reduces it to a pile of smoking microchips. Binary-bonded to Stylor, an egotistical Nebulan who is more concerned with personal appearance than warfare. In car mode, maximum speed: 478 mph. Range: 630 miles. Hood-mounted infra-red range finder automatically targets roof-mounted dual lasers.
| Brainstorm | Fighter aircraft | The Rebirth (Part 1) | The Rebirth (Part 3) | Michael Bell | Alive |
So full of ideas he often begins disclosing a new one before he finishes explaining the one at hand. Works with the mysterious Nebulan medical doctor, Arcana, to whom he is binary-bonded, to devise new technology that creates the Headmasters. In jet mode, maximum speed: 5200 mph. Range: 8000 miles. In robot mode, carries high-energy photon pulse cannons. Sometimes overheats and shorts out sections of his cerebro-circuitry.
| Highbrow | Helicopter | The Rebirth (Part 1) | The Rebirth (Part 3) | Johnny Haymer | Alive |
To him, warfare is barbaric, worthy of only the most primitive; he thinks differences need to be discussed, which he does endlessly. Highbrow is binary-bonded to Gort, a cheerful, courageous young Nebulan. In helicopter mode, maximum speed: 1200 mph; equipped with radioactive jammers, target-indicating radar, magnetic, infra-red, and audio sensors. In robot mode, uses two corrosive acid rainmaker rifles.
| Cerebros | Miniature Battle Station/Fortress Maximus' head | The Rebirth (Part 1) | The Rebirth (Part 3) | Jered Barclay | Alive |
War-weary Autobot must be repeatedly persuaded to join the others. Eventually became a Headmaster with Spike as his counterpart.
| Fortress Maximus | City/Battle Station | Created by Spike Witwicky in The Rebirth (Part 3); only appearance. | | Stephen Keener | Alive |
Valiant, courageous, a warrior without peer, but peace is his most fervent wish. Fights only out of necessity; believes all violence is ultimately pointless and counterproductive. Transforms to battle station and city modes. Armed with twin laser-guided mortars on legs, heat-seeking dual laser blasters, and fusion-powered photon rifle. Has communications, detection, and repair equipment. Controls two armored vehicles, Gasket and Grommet, which combine to form Cog. Head transforms to semi-autonomous Cerebros, who is binary-bonded to the Nebulan leader, Spike. In "Transformers: Super-God Masterforce", he has a Pretender brother named Grand Maximus.

=== Clonebots ===
The Clonebots are the Autobot's version of the Clonecons.

| Name | Alternate mode | Only appearances | Voiced by | Status |
|---|---|---|---|---|
| Fastlane/Cloudraker | Dune Buggy (Fastlane); Jet (Cloudraker) | The Rebirth (Part 1, 2) | Rob Paulsen (Fastlane); Danny Mann (Cloudraker) | Alive |
Cloudraker is often frustrated, cannot reach escape velocity and achieve orbit. Extreme claustrophobia – feels the sky is not big enough for him. Usually flies as high as he can. Terrified of being on the ground. In vehicle mode, uses two gravity-rod rifles to cause objects to float away or crash to the ground. Fastlane is a bit immature, sometimes acts like a thrill-seeking show-off, enjoys looking for new ways to get his kicks. Usually makes reckless driving a way of life. In vehicle mode, reaches maximum speed of 220 mph; maximum speed with booster jets: 550 mph. Range: 350 miles. In robot mode, carries two sonic boom rifles; one blast can shatter foot-thick steel.

=== Junkions ===
The Junkions are an Autobot tribe race of scrap metal robots who come from the planet of the same name.

| Name | Alternate mode | First and Last appearances | | Voiced by | status |
|---|---|---|---|---|---|
| Wreck-Gar | Motorcycle | The Transformers: The Movie | The Return of Optimus Prime (Part 1) | Eric Idle (movie), Tony Pope (TV series) | Alive |
The leader of the Junkions, who live on the planet that is also named Junkion. He is made of rusted scraps, chassis bits, manifold parts, and dented odd and ends. A little scatterbrained, he speaks in odd-rhyming, pieced together sentences. His words are a junkyard collection of broadcast fragments from TV commercials and radio jingles. In robot mode he carries an armor axe, and a decelerator laser that inhibits an enemy robot's flow of cerebral impulses. When blasted he transforms from motorcycle to robot mode back and forth, so fast continuously that it repairs himself. Wreck-Gar and his fellow Junkions have allied themselves with the Autobots.
| Junkyard | Motorcycle | The Transformers: The Movie | The Big Broadcast of 2006 | Michael Bell (movie), Jerry Houser (TV series) | Alive |
Junkyard is the public face of the Junkion commerce, and often sells used and refurbished components and items to other civilizations. Unlike most Junkions who are always quoting TV and media and can be very hard to understand if you are not a Junkion, Junkyard usually speaks in plain English. Junkyard is also very good at identifying the needs of his customers, is very good in business, is a skilled technician and does not like to fight in battle.
| Scrapheap | Motorcycle | The Transformers: The Movie | The Big Broadcast of 2006 | Frank Welker | Alive |
Scrapheap is a youthful and rebellious Junkion, whose average day consists of non-stop television marathons, rummaging through trash, and the occasional knock-down dragout motorcycle rally-slash slugfest. He often finds hidden treasures picking through the trash piles of refuse of his homeworld, but that's not what he wants to spend his life doing. He sees a career on his homeworld as an inventor as his ticket off his planet, and he is not above lying, stealing, and cheating to get what he needs to make it happen.
| Re-Cycle | Motorcycle | The Transformers: The Movie | The Big Broadcast of 2006 | Unknown | Alive |
Re-Cycle enjoys making and watching documentaries. He can transform into motorcycle mode and back to robot mode continuously in battle, so that his "ruins" become his transformed mode and back again any time he takes a direct hit. In robot mode, he carries an armor ax and a decelerator laser that inhibits an enemy robot's flow of cerebral impulses. In motorcycle mode he can attain a speed of 160 mph for a distance of 100 miles. After the Autobots and Junkions became friends, Re-Cycle gave Grimlock a kiss on the nose, which Grimlock did not like and objected to.
| Rubbish | Motorcycle | The Transformers: The Movie | The Big Broadcast of 2006 | Unknown | Alive |
Rubbish is a Junkion who likes British television, particularly sitcoms. When the Junkions attacked the Autobots stranded on their planet, Rubbish worked with Re-Cycle to capture Autobots and helped to throw a net on Blurr. After the Autobots and Junkions became allies, Rubbish took part in the reconstruction of Ultra Magnus.
| Hazmat | Motorcycle | The Transformers: The Movie | The Big Broadcast of 2006 | Unknown | Alive |
Hazmat prefers steampunk and zombie movies and TV and has the same abilities and functions of his fellow Junkions. He was among the Junkions who attacked the Autobots stranded on their planet, until the arrival of Hot Rod's party. The young Autobot's offering of the universal greeting and an energon goodie was well received by Hazmat and his fellow Junkions, who enthusiastically repeated the greeting.
| Ashtray | Motorcycle | The Transformers: The Movie | | Keiichi Nanba | Alive |
Ashtray is one of the Junkions who attacked the Autobots who crash landed on the planet Junkion. After he and the other Junkions befriended the Autobots, he went aboard the Minnow spaceship that attacked Unicron. After Unicron damaged the Minnow, Ashtray took part in its reconstruction.
| Greasestain | Motorcycle | The Transformers: The Movie | | Keiichi Nanba | Alive |
Greasestain is one of the Junkions who attacked the Autobots who crash landed on the planet Junkion. He is very good at fixing things and meeting the needs of his fellow Junkions and the Autobots. He was among the Junkions who boarded and took part in the reconstruction of the Minnow after the severe damage done to it that was caused by Unicron.
| Wasteoid Gamma | Motorcycle | The Transformers: The Movie | | Keiichi Nanba | Alive |
Wasteoid Gamma was among the Junkions who attacked the Autobots after they were stranded on their planet. Wasteoid Gamma rode Junkion Scrapheap into battle, while swinging his chain whip. Many other Junkions while passing ending up being yanked apart while trying to lasso Springer. The arrival of the Autobot's shuttle interrupted the battle, and as Hot Rod's party emptied their ship, Wasteoid Gamma walked up next to Wreck-Gar in case the new arrivals would be hostile and his leader would need help. This would not be the case, as Hot Rod offered the universal greeting and an energon goodie to the Junkions, which convinced them that the Autobots were not their enemies. The two groups then spontaneously began to celebrate their newly formed alliance.
| Trashbin | Motorcycle | The Transformers: The Movie | | N/A | Alive |
Trashbin was among the Junkions who attacked the Autobots after they were stranded on their planet. Trashbin went after Arcee, and while he was riding another Junkion up next to her, he smashed his axe against her side over and over. Arcee retaliated by driving a spike into the Junkion who he was riding causing Trashbin to fall off the Junkion. Like everything else the Autobots threw at the Junkions, it did not stop one or the other. Fortunately, Hot Rod's party found its way to the battle. Hot Rod offered the universal greeting as well as an energon goodie to the Junkions, which convinced them that the Autobots were not their foes. The two groups then ceased fighting and spontaneously began to celebrate the alliance that was newly formed.
| Nancy | Motorcycle | The Big Broadcast of 2006 | | Joy Grdnic | Alive |
Nancy is a Junkion who appears to be the consort of the Junkion leader Wreck-Gar. Nancy also seems to be romantically involved with Wreck-Gar. Like all Junkions, she spends countless hours watching TV, and like all Junkions, she can be blasted to pieces without taking any noticeable permanent damage, and is capable of repairing herself within seconds.
| Short Junkion | Motorcycle | The Big Broadcast of 2006 | | Frank Welker | Alive |
Short Junkion is, as the name would suggest, a small Junkion. Under the influence of the Quintessons' subliminal message, Short Junkion began tidying up the planet, finding the journal that the Quintessons had secretly been after in the process. He then took it to Wreck-Gar and was told to put the journal in the tube pile. Short Junkion and Wreck-Gar bantered for a bit before resuming their respective tasks.
| Other Junkions | Motorcycles | The Transformers: The Movie | The Big Broadcast of 2006 | N/A | Alive |
When Autobots Kup, Hot Rod, and The Dinobots who were flying the Quintessons' spaceship flew down towards the surface of the planet Junkion, they were able to see hundreds of Junkions below through the spaceship's windows who were very eager to investigate the spaceship after it had landed. An alliance was soon formed between the Autobots and Junkions after Hot Rod offered an energon goodie to Wreck-Gar and cited the universal greeting. It is unknown what the names of each individual Junkion is, but they're all known to be similar with the fact that they all like earth television, are made of the same material that their leader Wreck-Gar is made of, which is what their homeworld planet of junk is made of, and all transform into motorcycles.

== Decepticons ==
The Decepticons (known as Destrons or on occasion Deathtrons in Japan) are the enemies of the Autobots, and the villains in the fictional universe of the movie and cartoon Transformers toyline and related spin-off comics and cartoons. Their best known leader is Megatron.

=== Main characters ===
| Name | Alternate mode | First and Last appearances | | Voiced by | Status |
|---|---|---|---|---|---|
| Megatron | Walther P38 | More Than Meets the Eye (Part 1) | He was turned into Galvatron in The Transformers: The Movie. Last seen in The Return of Optimus Prime (Part 1) in a flashback. | Frank Welker (series); Leonard Nimoy in The Transformers: The Movie (as Galvatron) | Alive, Reformed as Galvatron (Died in Headmasters) |
Once a revolutionary opposed to the Cybertronian ruling order, Megatron is now the evil leader of the Decepticon organization he founded millions of years ago. Combines brute strength, military cunning, ruthlessness, and terror, he is often described as lacking known weaknesses. Incredibly powerful and intelligent, he led the Decepticons to almost total victory on Cybertron, albeit at the expense of Cybertron's energy reserves. After pursuing the Autobots when they fled Cybertron in search of energon, he schemes to destroy them, restore Cybertron, and extend his reach to stars after strip mining Earth's resources. He is reformatted by Unicron into "Galvatron" after being critically injured in his fight with Optimus Prime. Though initially retaining most of his Megatron personality, Galvatron becomes notably more sadistic and villainously insane after being submerged in plasma. In later versions, Megatron and Galvatron appear as separate entities. Wielding a particle beam fusion cannon far more powerful than standard Decepticon and Autobot weapons, he is able to alter his size when transforming into gun mode so that another may wield him and fire a more concentrated and even deadlier blast. In some adaptations, he is able to control his wielder directly. Megatron's backstory often involves his descent from a noble freedom fighter to an ambitious, control-obsessed despot spurred on by a deep-seated hatred of Optimus Prime and an addiction to vengeance.: Note: Megatron would have different transformations in later adaptations, most commonly a 1980 M1 Abrams tank.
| Starscream | 1975 F-15 Eagle | More Than Meets the Eye (Part 1) | Killed by Galvatron in The Transformers: The Movie, Later revived by Unicron in Ghost in the Machine. | Christopher Collins | Alive (body destroyed) |
A politically-minded, self-serving scientist-turned-soldier, Starscream is the Decepticons' wily and effective strike and raid commander and Megatron's nominal second in command. Ruthless, cold-blooded, and treacherous while considering himself the most sophisticated and handsome of Decepticons, he makes no secret of his desire to replace Megatron as leader but is tolerated due to his military usefulness. Believes Decepticons should rely more on guile and speed rather than brute force to defeat Autobots. Surprisingly observant and often correctly points out flaws in Megatron's plans, but his solutions, in the rare instances Megatron entertains them, are often ineffective. Starscream almost always eventually defects from the Decepticons to start his own faction, though he usually rejoins eventually; how long this takes and the level of success he finds depends on the adaptation. Ultimately, Starscream is very good at what he does but prone to overrating himself in overcompensation for latent insecurity mixed with paradoxical egomania. Possesses a unique, mutant spark which enables him to persist through death as a sort of ghost. Fastest flyer of the group, reaching Mach 2.8 and an altitude of 52 miles. Shoots cluster bombs and null-rays which disrupt the flow of electricity. This version of Starscream appears in the Beast Wars: Transformers episode "Possession", where he possessed the Predacon Waspinator.
| Soundwave | Microcassette recorder | More Than Meets the Eye (Part 1) | The Return of Optimus Prime (Part 1) | Frank Welker, Hal Rayle (in "Fight or Flee") | Alive (Reformed as Soundblaster in Headmasters) |
Soundwave is Megatron's most loyal soldier and one of the few Megatron seems to (occasionally) value on a personal level. Known for his unique, highly robotic voice. An expert in communications, surveillance, and intelligence work and among Megatron's more competent followers, particularly in G1 and its related media. Leads a small team of miniature Decepticon spies that transform into cassettes for storage in his chest. Sensors can detect even the lowest energy radio transmissions. Able to read minds by monitoring electrical brain impulses. Acts as radio link for others. Locates and identifies Autobots, then informs Decepticons. Carries a concussion blaster gun. In the Japanese-only Headmasters series, he is rebuilt and reformed as Soundblaster after being damaged in a fight with Autobot Blaster. Not above blackmailing other Decepticons, and in some adaptations plays the role of an opportunist despised by many who winds up the target of retaliation by his comrades, though this characterization is often limited to his Soundblaster persona.: Note: Perhaps due to changing technology, modern adaptations sometimes do not depict Soundwave as a cassette deck, instead having him transform into a drone, satellite, or other listening or recording device.
| Shockwave | Laser Pistol | More Than Meets the Eye (Part 1) | The Transformers: The Movie | Corey Burton | Unknown |
A faceless cyclops, his glowing eye, arm cannon, and deep purple color make him highly recognizable. Cold, brutal, scientific approach to war. Often confounded by emotional thinking and willing to make great and terrible sacrifices, he considers his dark work necessary for the greater good of Cybertron. Generally loyal and Megatron's most competent underling, he was left in charge of Cybertron when Megatron and the rest of his command staff pursued the Ark to Earth. An effective inventor, administrator, and operations officer, he stayed (mostly) online during the subsequent 4 million year Energon-less dormancy period that plagued Cybertron, eventually rediscovering and perfecting a (mostly) reliable mass teleportation device known as the "space bridge". As a laser gun, he can emit lethal beams of energy from anywhere on the electromagnetic spectrum: gamma rays, x-rays, light, infrared rays, radio waves, etc. Is not seen again in the original G1 series after Unicron's defeat, suggesting he may have died off-camera while defending Cybertron; however, he is usually present in later adaptations, and explicitly survived in at least one branching timeline.: Note: Like Megatron, Shockwave would have different transformations in later adaptations, often taking the form of a spaceship, artillery emplacement, or submarine.
| Skywarp | 1975 F-15 Eagle | More Than Meets the Eye (Part 1) | Turned into Cyclonus Cyclonus type space jet by Unicron in The Transformers: The Movie. | Frank Welker | Reformed as Cyclonus, his matching "Armada" jet, or a Sweep |
Alongside Soundwave and Shockwave, Skywarp is one of Megatron's loyal and most favored troops and among the sneakiest of all Decepticons. He is also the first Transformer to awaken on Earth, ensuring that the Decepticons were revived by Teletraan I at the expense of the Autobots. Enjoys playing cruel pranks on fellow Decepticons and appearing out of nowhere to attack Autobots. Not too smart; would be useless without Megatron's or Starscream's supervision. Has a unique ability to instantly teleport up to 2.5 miles. Carries heat-seeking missiles and variable-caliber machine guns. When Unicron creates Cyclonus, both Skywarp and Bombshell are reformatted simultaneously; it is unclear which is the real Cyclonus and which is his "Armada" clone. The answer to this question, as well as what becomes of "Armada" (who is not shown again after creation), varies across adaptations, with some even depicting Skywarp as still alive in his original form.
| Thundercracker | 1975 F-15 Eagle | More Than Meets the Eye (Part 1) | Turned into Scourge in The Transformers: The Movie. | John Stephenson, Wally Burr (in "War Dawn") | Reformed as Scourge. Later versions portray Thundercracker and Scourge as separate entities. |
Ostracized before the Great War, Thundercracker is contemptuous of anything that cannot fly. Not totally convinced of the Decepticons' cause, but they've persuaded him to continue battling the Autobots, in part due to making him feel welcome while others did not. Thundercracker can fly at speeds of up to 1500 mph and produce controlled, deafening sonic booms. Equipped with powerful drone rockets and incendiary guns. Doubts about his cause sometimes impede his effectiveness. Known as "Scourge", after dying during the battle of Autobot City and being reformatted by Unicron. Later versions portray Thundercracker and Scourge as separate entities and sometimes lean into his doubts, having him occasionally provide nominal assistance to the Autobots or turn neutral in support of humans.
| Reflector | 1981 Kodak Camera | More Than Meets the Eye (Part 1) | The Transformers: The Movie | Christopher Collins | Unknown |
A strange one, he is basically a 3-in-1 warrior-spy: 3 small Decepticons with a "hive-mind," all often talking at the same time. Loves to observe things: vegetation, architecture, Earthen topography, and particularly his comrades' mistakes. Arrogant and obnoxious. Likes to blackmail his associates and is impressed with his own ability. Has highly developed infra-red vision that can record images in darkness, through camouflage, and at great distances. In camera mode, can emit a powerful flash explosion that leaves enemies blind and disorientated for up to 15 minutes; can produce a lesser, but sustained beam of blinding light while in robot mode.

=== Insecticons ===
The Insecticons are a race of Cybertronians who can turn into insects. They possess the ability to eat any matter to power and enlarge themselves, create clones, sport weather-controlling abilities, and make use of cerebro-shells. They are often in a rocky alliance with the Decepticons, with both factions usually detesting the other but working together as circumstances require. All three die in the Battle of Autobot City before being reformatted by Unicron, though later adaptations sometimes portray them as still living entities separate from their new forms.

| Name | Alternate mode | First and Last appearances | | Voiced by | Status |
|---|---|---|---|---|---|
| Shrapnel | Stag beetle | A Plague of Insecticons | Turned into a Sweep in The Transformers: The Movie. | Hal Rayle | Reformed as a Sweep |
The leader of the Insecticons. In insect mode, Shrapnel can use his antennae to control almost any electrical device. In robot mode can attract lightning bolts to antennae and shoot them out from hands. Grenade launcher shoots 30 pound steel balls that splinter into razor-sharp spikes. Insulation can stop his electrical blasts.
| Bombshell | Japanese rhinoceros beetle | A Plague of Insecticons | Turned into one of the two Cyclonus type space jets in The Transformers: The Movie. | Michael Bell | Reformed as either Cyclonus, the matching "Armada" jet, or a Sweep |
While not generally considered the leader of the three, he is highly intelligent. Can turn foes into helpless accomplices by injecting cerebro-shells into their heads (robot or human) with his stinger, giving him control of their minds. In robot mode, Bombshell wields a head-mounted mortar. When Unicron creates Cyclonus, both Skywarp and Bombshell are reformatted simultaneously; it is unclear which is the real Cyclonus and which is his "Armada" clone. The answer to this question, as well as what becomes of "Armada" (who is not shown again after creation), varies across later continuations and adaptations.
| Kickback | Grasshopper | A Plague of Insecticons | Turned into a Sweep in The Transformers: The Movie. | Clive Revill | Reformed as a Sweep |
Charming but cruelly clever, Kickback makes friends so he can influence them to do his bidding by digging up facts he can hold against them. Humans particularly susceptible to this Insecticon. In insect mode can jump 40 ft. at once and kick a hole in 1/4" steel. In robot mode can fly 30 mph up to 100 miles. Sub-machine gun fires 300 rounds per minute. Very vulnerable as insect and flying in high winds.

=== Constructicons ===
The Constructicons are a race of Cybertronians who became construction vehicles and are the first combiners to appear in the show. They used to be friends with Omega Supreme before they were corrupted into serving Megatron. They combine to form Devastator.

| Name | Alternate mode | First and Last appearances | | Voiced by | Status |
|---|---|---|---|---|---|
| Scrapper | Front-end loader | Heavy Metal War | The Rebirth (Part 1) | Michael Bell | Alive |
(Usually) the leader of the Constructicons. A wizard at designing fortresses and energy plants, but modest. Shows his true malevolent genius by incorporating dead Autobots into his buildings' structures. Shovel can slice through 12 in. thick carbon-steel, and can lift 30 tons.
| Hook | Crane truck | Heavy Metal War | The Rebirth (Part 1) | Neil Ross, Corey Burton (in "Day of the Machines") | Alive |
With precision of a fine jeweler, performs his job with skill unequalled among The Transformers, whether reconnecting a damaged microchip or setting a two-ton girder into place. Snobbish, supercilious, unpopular perfectionist. Lifts 20 tons.
| Bonecrusher | Bulldozer | Heavy Metal War | The Rebirth (Part 1) | Neil Ross, Michael Bell (in "The Autobot Run") | Alive |
Rubble-strewn wasteland is his idea of beautiful landscape. His wild ways create fear and terror. As vehicle, at 30 mph exerts 800,000 psi and wields a short-range concussion bomb launcher. As robot, carries laser pistol.
| Long Haul | Haul truck | Heavy Metal War | The Rebirth (Part 1) | Gregg Berger | Alive |
Long Haul helps build Decepticons' massive energy-recovery installations. As vehicle, can carry 90 tons for 1200 miles, use a dual heat-seeking missile mount. Can be goaded into fight in which he is overmatched.
| Scavenger | Excavator | Heavy Metal War | The Rebirth (Part 1) | Don Messick | Alive |
Desperately tries to prove his worth to comrades by trying to find things of value – whether by digging up hillside or a backyard, and they all love him and is the best one out of them all. Megatron secretly thinks Scavenger is the best decepticon because of ability to use shovel's magnetic, ionic, electrical, gas sensors to detect presence of fuels, metals, etc.: Trivia: G1
| Mixmaster | Cement mixer truck | Heavy Metal War | The Rebirth (Part 1) | Frank Welker | Alive |
Mixmaster will use anything from unliving rock to living robot in making new materials. Uses acids and bonding agents to reduce and recombine almost anything inside mixing drum, making him a chemistry lab on wheels.
| Devastator | The 6 Constructicons | Heavy Metal War | The Burden Hardest to Bear | Arthur Burghardt | Alive |
Awesome and terrifying, this Decepticon is a bizarre combination of six Constructicons: Scrapper, Scavenger, Bonecrusher, Hook, Long Haul and Mixmaster. Pure brutality – sole purpose is to crush all in his path. His mind is a melding together of his six parts, but limited by their competing thoughts. Enormous height, incredible strength – can knock down a bridge with one punch. Has 10,000 degrees Celsius solar energy beam rifle. Slow, awkward, not too bright.

=== Coneheads ===
The Coneheads are a Decepticon group who are mostly jet fighters, and whose heads are in the shape of the tip of a nose cone.

| Name | Alternate mode | First and Last appearances | | Voiced by | Status |
|---|---|---|---|---|---|
| Thrust | Vertical Takeoff Jet Fighter | Appears in Dinobot Island (Part 1). First speaks in Dinobot Island (Part 2). | Ghost in the Machine. Thrust was killed by Unicron in The Transformers: The Movie, but erroneously resurfaced in later episodes. | Ed Gilbert | Alive (but killed by Unicron in the film) |
Thrust believes half the battle is won if the opponent is "psyched out" by his mere arrival, so he makes no attempt to be sneaky. Pompous, loud-mouthed braggart and not too brave. Sudden, powerful accelerations can topple nearby buildings. Flies at mach 2.5, can double speed in 20 seconds for up to two minutes. Carries four air-to-air missiles and two automatic missile launchers in robot mode.
| Ramjet | Jet Fighter | Appears in Dinobot Island (Part 1). First speaks in The Master Builder. | Thief in the Night. Ramjet was killed by Unicron in The Transformers: The Movie, but erroneously resurfaced in later episodes. | Jack Angel | Alive (but killed by Unicron in the film) |
Mid-air collisions are his specialty. Makes little difference if target is opponent or not, he will crash into it just for fun. A terror without equal in the skies. "The skies are my castle and I like to live alone." His nose module can withstand impact of three-foot thick concrete at 1500 mph. Flies as fast as mach 2.8. Carries cluster bombs. Too many crashes can injure him, particularly internal mechanics.
| Dirge | Jet Fighter | Appears in Dinobot Island (Part 2). First speaks in Auto Berserk. | Ghost in the Machine. Dirge was killed by Unicron in The Transformers: The Movie, but erroneously resurfaced in later episodes. | Bud Davis | Alive (but killed by Unicron in the film) |
The sound of his engines causes petrifying fear in those who hear them. He is a master at handling fear. Other Decepticons put off by his mournful, silent ways. "He gives me the creeps," says Ramjet. He carries two concussion missiles. Needs to control a situation otherwise, he, too falls victim to fear.

=== Decepticon City ===
| Name | Alternate mode | First and Last appearances | | Voiced by | Status |
|---|---|---|---|---|---|
| Trypticon | Tyrannosaurus/Decepticon City/Battle Station | Scramble City, created by the Constructicons in Five Faces of Darkness (Part 4) | Call of the Primitives | Brad Garrett | Alive |
Trypticon was created by the Constructicons out of a city. Does not stop blasting until he is hip-deep in smoking rubble. Completely without mercy. Though dim-witted, he is the most lethal fighting machine devised by the Decepticons. In a Tyrannosaurus-like mode, where he physically resembles Toho's Mechagodzilla, Trypticon jumps 20 miles with a rocket backpack, shoots heat-seeking plasma bombs from mouth, and shoots mind-controlling hypno-beam from optical sensor. As a city, Trypticon has landing and repair bays, communications center, and rotating scanners. In mobile station mode, Trypticon has laser cannon, rotating blasters, destructo-beams, and dual photon launchers. Due to his size and inefficient use of energy, he is highly energy-consumptive, and is often left inoperable. Ever since the episode Five Faces Of Darkness (Part 5), he and Metroplex became mortal enemies.

=== Stunticons ===
The Stunticons are a Decepticon faction and their second combiner group who was created by the Decepticons through Vector Sigma. The Decepticons stole five earth vehicles to create them. They combine to form Menasor.

| Name | Alternate Mode | First and Last appearances | | Voiced by | Status |
|---|---|---|---|---|---|
| Motormaster | Kenworth K100 Aerodyne Sleeper Tractor Trailer | Created by the Decepticons in The Key to Vector Sigma (Part 1) | The Return of Optimus Prime (Part 1) | Roger C. Carmel | Alive |
The leader of the Stunticons. No one on the road is colder and crueler. Shows no mercy to Autobots who happen to be on the highway with him. Seeks to destroy Optimus Prime so he can claim to be "King of the Road." Can survive a collision with anyone, except Optimus Prime. No real weaknesses, except for a high fuel consumption rate. The other Stunticons resent and despise him, but fear him to the point of never disobeying his orders. Reaches a top speed of 140 mph and can shatter a 20-foot concrete block. Uses a 400 mph, wind producing cyclone gun.
| Drag Strip | Tyrrell P34 | Created by the Decepticons in The Key to Vector Sigma (Part 1) | The Return of Optimus Prime (Part 1) | Ron Gans | Alive |
Nasty, underhanded, loves to gloat over his victories. Would rather be scrapped than lose. Prone to overheating. Megatron would sooner melt him than talk to him, but knows he is even worse company for the Autobots. In car mode, has a plasma-energy blaster. Carries a gravity-enhancing gravito-gun.
| Dead End | Porsche 928 | Created by the Decepticons in The Key to Vector Sigma (Part 1) | The Return of Optimus Prime (Part 1) | Philip L. Clarke | Alive |
Sullen, fatalistic, sees little reason to continue Transformers' war. Motivating him to fight is always a problem. Vain – spends most of his time shining himself. In car mode, goes 220 mph. Radar scan covers 200 mile radius. In robot mode, has a compressor-air gun that shoots a 40,000 psi blast of air.
| Breakdown | Lamborghini Countach | Created by the Decepticons in The Key to Vector Sigma (Part 1) | The Return of Optimus Prime (Part 1) | Alan Oppenheimer, Jack Angel (in "The Key to Vector Sigma") | Alive |
Thinks everyone is staring at him, even Earth cars and stoplights. His self-consciousness hurts his performance. Finds heavy traffic nerve-wracking. Would prefer to be human so he could fit in better. In car mode, engine emits vibrations that cause mechanical failures in other vehicles; prone to leaky fuel pump. In robot mode, carries a concussion rifle which also causes mechanical failures.
| Wildrider | Ferrari 308 GTB | Created by the Decepticons in The Key to Vector Sigma (Part 1) | The Return of Optimus Prime (Part 1) | Terry McGovern | Alive |
Look out motorists – he exults in the accidents he causes! Driving recklessly, screaming and laughing. Some comrades think it is an act, others really know he is really as nuts as he appears. Fears quiet, prone to tire blow-outs. In car mode goes up to 250 mph with amazing maneuverability. In robot mode, his scattershot gun sprays laser beams over wide areas.
| Menasor | The 5 Stunticons | The Key to Vector Sigma (Part 2) | The Ultimate Weapon | Regis Cordic, Roger C. Carmel (in "The Key to Vector Sigma") | Alive |
A clanking, crushing terror that destroys all in his path – the ultimate Decepticon weapon if he was not so confused by the opposing thoughts of the 5 Stunticons who comprise him. Tremendous strength, his punch has the force of 140 tons. Impervious to most artillery. Uses Motormaster's cyclone gun and carries an ionizer sword with a 50,000 volt charge. Ever since The Key To Vector Sigma (Part 2), he and Superion became mortal enemies.

=== Combaticons ===
The Combaticons are a Decepticon faction and their third Combiner group. When Megatron banished Starscream to the island of Guadalcanal, he found old military vehicles from World War II and used stolen personality components which he placed into the vehicles to create the Combaticons. They combine into Bruticus.

| Name | Alternate mode | First and Last appearances | | Voiced by | Status |
|---|---|---|---|---|---|
| Onslaught | Self-propelled artillery Truck | Created by Starscream in Starscream's Brigade | The Rebirth (Part 3) | S. Marc Jordan, Steve Bulen (in "The Rebirth") | Alive |
The leader of the Combaticons. Believes the key to a mission's success lies in the perfection of its planning. Prefers devising sinister schemes to actual combat, but a relentless, furious fighter when stirred into action. As a missile trailer, Onslaught is capable of launching 6500-mile range photon missiles, each equivalent to 3000 tons of TNT. Accuracy of missiles is hampered by electromagnetic interference. Uses powerful sonic stun gun in robot mode.
| Brawl | Up-armed Leopard 1 Tank | Created by Starscream in Starscream's Brigade | The Rebirth (Part 3) | Tony St. James | Alive |
Noisy, irritates all nearby. He has a hair-trigger temper, blusteringly belligerent, making him a terrifyingly effective warrior. Enormously strong, resistant to most conventional artillery. As tank, goes 45 mph, range 600 miles. Turret-mounted gun shoots 200 lbs. TNT-equivalent shells, twin sonic cannon shoots powerful, ear-splitting 300-decibel bursts of concentrated sound energy in stereo. In robot mode, has 10-Megawatt electron gun.
| Swindle | FMC XR311 combat support vehicle | Created by Starscream in Starscream's Brigade | The Rebirth (Part 3) | Johnny Haymer | Alive |
Easy-going and good natured, but within him beats the fuel pump of the most greed-driven street hustler. Thrives on wheeling and dealing, works for his own personal material advancement. A one-robot "black market." Uses a scatter blaster that sprays explosive pellets, gyro gun that disrupts Transformers' balance center. Prone to overturning on sharp turns.
| Blast Off | Space Shuttle | Created by Starscream in Starscream's Brigade | The Rebirth (Part 3) | Milt Jamin | Alive |
Feels literally and figuratively above the other Transformers as he soars through outer space. Aristocratic, aloof – disguises his long distance loneliness. Cruelly efficient at raining destruction on Earth. Flies at 26,000 mph, stays in orbit for eight months. Shoots powerful X-ray laser to hit target 12,000 miles away. In robot mode, uses ionic blaster.
| Vortex | SH-2 Seasprite | Created by Starscream in Starscream's Brigade | The Rebirth (Part 3) | Johnny Haymer | Alive |
Gives a ride to remember – in your nightmares! Takes Autobots on dizzying, death-defying flights to scare information out of them. As a helicopter, he goes 300 mph with a range of 1200 miles. Whirls rotor blades to create 200-300 mph wind funnels. Uses semi-automatic glue gun.
| Bruticus | The 5 Combaticons | Starscream's Brigade | The Return of Optimus Prime (Part 1) | Roger C. Carmel | Alive |
The 5 Combaticons merge to become Bruticus. Can destroy his enemies with ultrasonic waves and smash metal bridges with a single chop of his hand. Cold blooded, likes nothing more than destroying Autobots. Once he starts running wild he is unstoppable. Has small brain circuits, making him simple-minded. Carries a sonic stun gun and a missile cannon. He is mortal enemies with Defensor.

=== Heralds of Unicron ===
Unicron used some Decepticons to create his heralds.

| Name | Alternate mode | First and Last appearances | | Voiced by | Status |
|---|---|---|---|---|---|
| Galvatron | Laser Cannon | The Transformers: The Movie | The Rebirth (Part 3) Later killed in Transformers: Headmasters (in Japan). | Leonard Nimoy (Movie), Frank Welker (TV series) | Alive |
The later evil leader of the Decepticons. Galvatron is a cold-hearted robotic supervillain. Revealed to be Megatron reformatted by Unicron because his body was badly damaged during his last fight with Optimus Prime at Autobot City. Determined to lead the Decepticons and destroy Cybertron since the Autobots took it back from the Decepticons, forcing them to abandon their Earth base and retreat to the planet Charr, which would result in disposing of Megatron's dream of reviving Cybertron. Possesses enough strength to pulverize an Autobot into scrap metal. Unconquerable. Arrogant and compassionless. Plots against his allies, thus weakening his position. In robot mode, he carries a fission laser cannon that emits chemically produced, direct-current electricity. In later media Galvatron was made into a separate entity.
| Cyclonus | Cybertronian Space Jet | The Transformers: The Movie | The Rebirth (Part 3) | Roger C. Carmel, Jack Angel (in "The Return of Optimus Prime" and Season 4) | Alive |
Cyclonus is Galvatron's most loyal soldier and is a huge and emotionless air warrior created by Unicron from the remains of either Bombshell or Skywarp. He is followed by his Armada, which includes at least one similar to him, created from the remains of arguably Bombshell and/or Skywarp. Cyclonus has vast resources of power and can draw strength in direct proportion to his need. Cyclonus is equipped with nuclear-powered turbine engines which enable him to reach speeds greater than Mach 2. In robot mode, he carries an oxidating laser that fuses an enemy robot's internal mechanisms. Cyclonus is a true loyal Decepticon and an honourable second-in-command. He considers the Autobot second-in-command Ultra Magnus as his arch-rival, has no weaknesses and no interests other than conquest. As a Targetmaster, he is paired with Nightstick, a Nebulan master criminal who doubles as a blinding, corroding black-beam gun. In later media he was depicted as a separate entity from Bombshell and Skywarp.
| Scourge | Cybertronian Hovercraft | The Transformers: The Movie | The Rebirth (Part 3) | Stan Jones | Alive |
Scourge is fearsome, merciless and an implacable hunter. Created from the remains of Thundercracker, he leads "The Sweeps", a wolf pack of tracker-terminators designed to hunt down and eradicate Autobots. Scourge possesses powerful high-tech scanning equipment and a disintegrator ray that can cut through solid rock. In robot mode, he carries a laser blaster that shoots short bursts of intense heat. Scourge's only weakness is his arrogance. As a Targetmaster, he is paired with Fracas, a high-temperature incendiary cannon with a volatile temper to match. Later media depicts Scourge as a separate entity from Thundercracker.
| Sweeps | Cybertronian Hovercraft | The Transformers: The Movie | The Return of Optimus Prime Part 2 & The Transformers: The Movie Destroyed by Grimlock and Sludge when attacking Autobot City they breathe fire at them destroying 1. | Jack Angel (in "Webworld", "The Dweller in the Darkness", "Call of the Primitives"); Corey Burton; Paul Eiding (in "Starscream's Ghost"); Dick Gautier (in "Webworld"); Ed Gilbert (in "Five Faces of Darkness"); Jerry Houser; Aron Kincaid; Chris Latta (in "Ghost in the Machine"); Hal Rayle; Neil Ross (in "The Five Faces of Darkness" and "The Dweller in the Depths"); Clive Revill; Beau Weaver; Frank Welker | Several Alive, Several Dead |
Formed by Unicron from the remains of the Insecticons Kickback, and Shrapnel, the Sweeps are identical to their leader Scourge. They do not talk much, but when they do, the voices are different. They are often pushed around and shot at by Galvatron.

=== Multi Changers ===
The Triple Changers are Decepticons who have more than one alternative mode.

| Name | Alternate mode | First and Last appearances | | Voiced by | Status |
|---|---|---|---|---|---|
| Octane | Boeing 747/Tanker Truck | Appears in Five Faces of Darkness (Part 1). First speaks in Thief in the Night. | Temporarily goes into exile after last being seen in The Ultimate Weapon. In Starscream's Ghost, he becomes an Autobot briefly, but rejoins the Decepticons. | Beau Weaver | Alive |
A greedy, mean-spirited bully. Enjoys watching fellow Decepticons become painfully inoperative from lack of fuel. Forces Autobots off roads and Aerialbots to abort landings just for fun. Crashes make him laugh. In jet mode: range 700 miles, maximum speed 750 mph. In tanker mode: range 65,000 miles, maximum speed 90 mph, carries 10,000 gallons of fuel. Carries fuel-powered flamethrower and deflecto-shield. Last known position held is commander of Trypticon (Decepticon City).
| Blitzwing | Type 74 Tank/MiG-25 Foxbat | Appears in Dinobot Island (Part 1). First speaks in Desertion of the Dinobots (Part 1). | Briefly went into exile after Five Faces of Darkness (Part 5). Last seen in The Return of Optimus Prime (Part 1). | Ed Gilbert | Alive |
Ability as a Triple Changer to rapidly transform makes him one of the most dangerous Decepticons. Cruel sense of humor; but formerly loud-mouthed, belligerent, and brash until after the five-part mini-series "The Five Faces of Darkness", when he became a partial pacifist yet still loyal to his team. As jet, he flies at mach 2.7, range 1500 miles, has heat-seeking concussion missiles. As tank, has track-mounted cannon that fires explosive shells 3.5 miles. As robot has electron-scimitar and gyro-blaster rifle. Often gets stuck in mid-transformation. Can alter his body mass to a larger size for transporting troops/cargo.
| Astrotrain | JNR Class D62 steam locomotive/Space Shuttle | Appears in Megatron's Master Plan (Part 2). First speaks in Blaster Blues. | The Burden Hardest to Bear | Jack Angel | Alive |
Creating confusion is his specialty. Believes the poor should be exploited, the weak oppressed, and the noble corrupted. As a Triple Changer, can switch from space shuttle to locomotive to robot almost instantaneously. Thrives on foes' panic and fear. As shuttle, travels at 20,000 mph in orbit, up to 50,000 mph out of orbit. As a train, top speed is 400 mph, range 1700 miles. As robot has great strength, carries powerful ionic displacer rifle. Can also alter his mass for transport; usually used as a main space transport.
| Sixshot | Tank/Armored Car/Starship/Laser Pistol/Wolf | The Rebirth (Part 1) | | Neil Ross | Alive |
A giant six-changer Decepticon with a vile, nasty, murderous disposition. He carries out his job with ferocious intensity. Only redeeming quality is he speaks well of those he has sent to "the great junkyard in the sky," his phrase for destruction. Has six forms: robot, armored carrier, ramming-tank, jet-propelled laser pistol, star fighter, and wolf-creature modes.

=== Predacons ===
The Predacons are a Decepticon faction and their fourth combiner group. They can turn into animals and combine to form Predaking.

| Name | Alternate mode | First and Last appearances | | Voiced by | Status |
|---|---|---|---|---|---|
| Razorclaw | Lion | Five Faces of Darkness (Part 5) | The Return of Optimus Prime (Part 2) and Call of the Primitives | Joe Leahy | Alive |
As the leader of the Predacons, he is all business and hates waste in all forms. Razorclaw explodes into furious, ferocious action when it is time to strike. As lion, can leap distances as long as a football field. Claws can rip through foot-thick steel. Has twin concussion blasters and sonic sword.
| Tantrum | Buffalo | Appears in Five Faces of Darkness (Part 5). First speaks in Chaos. | Call of the Primitives | Philip L. Clarke | Alive |
Prefers brute force over reason and will never back down from a challenge. Steam comes from his nasal ducts when he is enraged. Smashes head-first into highway trestles and small buildings to relieve his aggression. Always feels better afterwards. Carries 4 exterior fuel tanks, capacity 1600 gallons, as a reserve for himself and his comrades. His horns shoot bolts of 20,000 volt electricity. Carries a catalytic carbine that shoots destructive chemicals, and an electro-sword.
| Rampage | Tiger | Appears in Five Faces of Darkness (Part 5). First speaks in Nightmare Planet. | The Return of Optimus Prime (Part 2) and Call of the Primitives | Laurie Faso | Alive |
Barrels through life with an uncontrolled fury. Has difficulty talking coherently for more than a few seconds before violently lashing out at anything near him, friend or foe. Rampage possesses immense strength, allowing him to leap hundreds of feet in one jump. He wields a 60,000 volt lightning rifle, 5000 degree thermo-sword.
| Headstrong | Indian rhinoceros | Five Faces of Darkness (Part 5) | The Return of Optimus Prime (Part 2) and Call of the Primitives | Ron Feinberg | Alive |
Does not listen to anyone, particularly his friends. Smug, arrogant. Puts up a stubborn front to hide deep-rooted insecurities. More vulnerable to psychological rather than physical attacks. In rhinoceros mode, his horn can puncture 3-foot thick steel, release corrosive acid. Uses plasma-sphere shooter that emits explosive energy balls; has light distorting diffraction sword.
| Divebomb | Eagle | Five Faces of Darkness (Part 5) | The Return of Optimus Prime (Part 2) and Call of the Primitives | Laurie Faso | Alive |
He is like a kid at a candy store – always delighted by all the targets he has to choose from. Builds mecha-nests atop tall buildings and mountains; composed of late model sports cars, wings of jets, theater marquees. Back-mounted rocket thrusters allows speeds of 300 mph, 2000 mile range. Can see a dime from 10,000 feet. Has particle-beam rifle with infra-red sight, and laser-guided sword. Magnetism inhibits flying ability.
| Predaking | The 5 Predacons | Five Faces of Darkness (Part 5) | The Return of Optimus Prime (Part 2) and Call of the Primitives | Bud Davis | Alive |
The closest thing to a perfect fighting machine that the Decepticons have. As a warrior he has no equal; as a weapon he has no restraints. His actions result from seemingly savage, animal instinct. Can lift 500 tons; reacts to any movement he sees within .002 seconds. Can generate protective electric field. Wields powerful x-ray laser cannon. Each foot houses twin mortar shell launchers. Wields a large plasma sword. No known weaknesses. Has deep-rooted animosity against Sky Lynx whom he sees as his rival.

=== Battlechargers ===
The Battlechargers are a duo of Decepticon dragsters.

| Name | Alternate mode | First and Last appearances | | Voiced by | Status |
|---|---|---|---|---|---|
| Runabout | Lotus Esprit | Ghost in the Machine | | Roger Behr | Alive |
Likes to watch things blow up – the bigger the explosion the better. Uses parked cars and gas station fuel pumps for target practice. Usually stays busy as a Battlecharger, but terrified of boredom. Maximum speed: 185 mph. Range: 550 miles. Has high-energy particle beam rifle. Easily distracted by a beautiful car – because he wants to destroy it, not admire it.
| Runamuck | Pontiac Trans-Am | Chaos | Ghost in the Machine | Roger Behr | Alive |
Cackling like a mechanical wildman, this Battlecharger is a twirling, tumbling two-lane terror. Spreading fear is his favorite pastime. Admires junkyards like humans admire art museums. Maximum speed: 180 mph. Range: 600 miles. Uses friction rifle that increases kinetic energy of its target's molecules for five minutes. Even the slightest movements result in tremendous friction, causing flames and melting. Afraid of heights.

=== Terrorcons ===
The Terrorcons are a Decepticon faction and their fifth combiner group. They can turn into various monsters and combine to form Abominus.

| Name | Alternate mode | First and Last appearance | | Voiced by | Status |
|---|---|---|---|---|---|
| Hun-Gurrr | Two-Headed Dragon | Grimlock's New Brain | The Rebirth (Part 3) | Marshall Efron (beast mode) and Stephen Keener (robot mode) | Alive |
The leader of the Terrorcons. Hun-Gurrr has the desire to devour the Autobots. He transforms into a two-headed white dragon. He is very greedy and very often fills his stomach with as much energy and whatever other materials that he is able to acquire. He is very aggressive in nature and forms the torso of the combiner Abominus.
| Rippersnapper | Bipedal shark-like creature (referred as "lizard" on its toy version's instructions) | Appears in Grimlock's New Brain. First speaks in Money Is Everything. | The Rebirth (Part 3) | Jim Cummings | Alive |
Rippersnapper is a nasty land shark who has two legs and his inferiority complex is massive. Because of this he takes his frustration out on anything that he is able to. He just cannot stand the odor of lifeforms that are carbon-based either.
| Blot | Ogre (referred as a non-specified "monster" on its toy version's instructions) | Appears in Grimlock's New Brain | The Rebirth (Part 3) | Tony St. James | Alive |
Blot is a very fierce looking blue brutish monster who looks very much like an Ogre. He is clearly the most vile of all Decepticons as he oozes liquids that cannot be described from different parts of his body, and has an odor that smells so horrible that it often keeps both his enemies and friends alike to stay away from him. He is almost never seen in his robot form as he would rather stay in his alternate mode.
| Sinnertwin | Two-Headed Dragon | Appears in Grimlock's New Brain. First speaks in Money Is Everything. | The Rebirth (Part 3) | Jared Barclay and David Workman | Alive |
Sinnertwin who is also known as "Twinstrike" is a fierce, powerful, and brutish monster who had two heads. His two heads often argue with each other. Anything that comes into his presence is very unfortunate as they may have little chance of surviving his attack.
| Cutthroat | Harpy | Appears in Grimlock's New Brain. First speaks in Money Is Everything. | The Rebirth (Part 3) | Tony St. James | Alive |
Cutthroat is mission-focused, and the only winged member of the Terrorcons. He enjoys trashing Autobots perhaps more than any other Decepticon. He will destroy things to their very last form. He does not really like to merge to become Abominus as he feels that Abominus is not as aggressive as he is.
| Abominus | The five Terrorcons | Grimlock's New Brain | The Rebirth (Part 2) | Jim Gosa | Alive |
Even more so than the other Decepticon combiners, Abominus is a being of mindless fury. He's not truly a warrior—he's an animal, the destructive rages of the Terrorcons who compose him personified. His commanders cannot give him orders simplistic enough for him to understand, so they just point him in the direction of objects that need to be smashed, and turn him loose.

=== Decepticon Targetmasters ===
These Targetmasters were created by the Nebulons on Lord Zarak's side.

| Name | Alternate mode | First and Last appearances | | Voiced by | status |
|---|---|---|---|---|---|
| Slugslinger | Jet Fighter | The Rebirth (Part 1) | The Rebirth (Part 3) | Peter Cullen | Alive |
A brawling, swaggering braggart, claims he will challenge anyone to a duel, but prefers sneaking up and shooting enemies in the back. When his ammunition runs out, so does his courage. Paired with Caliburst, one-time Nebulan leading actor who only does this for the money. As an automatic machine gun, Caliburst can shoot armor-piercing shells at 1200 rounds per minute. In jet mode, maximum speed: 2400 mph.
| Triggerhappy | Jet Fighter F1 Eagle | The Rebirth (Part 1) | The Rebirth (Part 3) | Charlie Adler | Alive |
Usually too busy laughing uncontrollably and drooling out oil to look where he is shooting. Loves the sound of his guns blasting away. Wild and unpredictable. Paired with Blowpipe, a powerful compressed-air cannon who is also the conniving, envious brother-in-law of Lord Zarak, the Nebulan leader of the Decepticon Headmasters. In jet mode, has side-mounted, rapid-fire photon-pulse guns. Maximum speed: 1,980 mph.
| Misfire | Jet Fighter | Appears in The Rebirth (Part 1). First speaks in The Rebirth (Part 2). | The Rebirth (Part 3) | Stan Jones | Alive |
When Misfire shoots, his fellow Decepticons run for cover. Has terrible aim, but he says he is improving. No one else shares his confidence. Paired with the cowardly Nebulan, Aimless, a former construction engineer who had one too many buildings collapse due to poor design; now he does not care enough about anything to even bother aiming when he shoots as an ion particle blaster. Maximum speed: 1600 mph.

=== Decepticon Headmasters ===
These Headmasters were created by the Decepticons on Lord Zarak's side. Most of them were made from the heads of the Decepticons who have animal forms.

| Name | Alternate mode | First and Last appearances | | Voiced by | status |
|---|---|---|---|---|---|
| Scorponok | City/Scorpion | Created by Lord Zarak in The Rebirth (Part 2). First speaks in The Rebirth (Part 3). | The Rebirth (Part 3) | Stephen Keener | Alive |
Despair and isolation are all that remain in his wake. Like Astrotrain, he believes the poor should be exploited, the weak oppressed, and the noble corrupted. Others' pain is his sole pleasure. In scorpion mode, tail shoots 100,000 volt electric bursts, has twin pulse blasters, claws can crush mountains. In defense base mode, has over-the-horizon radar, communications center, anti-aircraft sonic cannon, repair bay, construction bay; semi-autonomous armored interceptor with dual photon cannons that patrol the base perimeter. In robot mode, has fusion-powered anti-gravity gun. Binary-bonded to Lord Zarak, leader of the evil Nebulans.
| Weirdwolf | Wolf | The Rebirth (part 1) | The Rebirth (part 3) | Stan Jones (animal noises only) | Alive |
Cruel, vicious, but apparently built with a few wires crossed. Talks to himself in a song-song backward way: "Destroy the Autobots I shall. Tear them to scrap I will." Binary-bonded to Monzo, a brutish, professional hyperwrestler- turned underworld nightclub owner. In robot mode, uses photon pistol and thermal sword. In wolf mode, nose module is equipped with various tracking scanners. Can leap 0.8 miles (1.3 km).
| Skullcruncher | Alligator | The Rebirth (Part 1) First speaks in The Rebirth (Part 3). | The Rebirth (Part 3) | Christopher Collins | Alive |
Skullcruncher is a crocodilian Decepticon and has a habit of grinding his teeth before he strikes—annoying his friends and tipping off his enemies. Binary-bonded to Grax, a Nebulan industrialist who's joined up to eliminate his competition. In robot mode, uses softening ray run—gives metal the consistency of rubber, making his enemies easier to chew when he reverts to alligator mode.
| Mindwipe | Bat | The Rebirth (Part 1) | The Rebirth (Part 3) | Stephen Keener | Alive |
A mystic with a vampire-like personality; spends most of his time trying to contact the electromagnetic essences of long-dead Decepticons than talking to live ones. Binary-bonded to Vorath, former Nebulan Minister of Science, expelled from office as a result of an illegal experiments scandal. In bat mode, has hypnotic stare, flies at 700 mph. In robot mode, uses "viper pistol"—shoots streams of neuro-circuitry paralyzing liquid.

=== Horrorcons ===
The Horrorcons are the triple-changers of the Decepticon Headmasters.

| Name | Alternate mode | First and Last appearances | | Voiced by | status |
|---|---|---|---|---|---|
| Apeface | Fighter Jet / Gorilla | The Rebirth (Part 1) | The Rebirth (Part 3) | Dick Gautier | Alive |
Thoroughly obnoxious—pounds loudly on his chest plates, insults everyone he talks to, knocks over anyone in his way, never changes his lubricant so he smells like a grease-encrusted turboworm, and spits fuel in public. Binary-bonded to the nervous, insecure Spasma. In jet mode, maximum speed: 3250 mph, emits powerful jamming frequencies. In gorilla mode, he has super-agility. In robot mode, carries electro-shield and semi-automatic sonic boomer gun.
| Snapdragon | Fighter Jet / Allosaurus | The Rebirth (Part 1,2) | | Dan Gilvezan | Alive |
Wading up to his neck in grease is his idea of a good time. Lazy, difficult to motivate, but has a hair-trigger temper. Binary-bonded to Krunk, the vicious, vile bodyguard to the Nebulan leader, Lord Zarak. In jet mode, his maximum speed is 8,800 mph. In Allosaurus mode, carbon-steel claws and teeth can cut through almost anything. Has two balance destroying gyro-guns in robot mode.

=== Clonecons ===
The Clonecons are the Decepticon's version of the Clonebots.

| Name | Alternate mode | Only appearance | Voiced by | Status |
|---|---|---|---|---|
| Pounce / Wingspan | Cougar (Pounce); Hawk (Wingspan) | The Rebirth (Part 1) | Stan Jones (Pounce); Peter Cullen (Wingspan) | Alive |
Pounce is sly, silent, and savage. The right machine for the right job. Often ignores his victims' pleas for mercy. In puma mode, can leap .7 miles. Possesses superior eyesight and sense of smell. In robot mode, laser range finder in optical sensors provides 99.4% accuracy with twin anti-personnel missile launching bayonets. Wingspan is always poking his beak where it does not belong. Nosey. Voracious appetite for new data to analyze. Looks in windows as readily as he spies on enemy troops. In hawk mode – has superb vision. Chemical and infra-red sensors collect and analyze geographical data – locate resources. In robot mode – has two electro-burst rifles.

== Humans ==
| Name | First and Last appearances | | Voiced by |
|---|---|---|---|
| Sparkplug Witwicky | More Than Meets the Eye (Part 1) | Scramble City | Chris Latta |
Human mechanic, father of Spike Witwicky, father-in law of Carly Witwicky, and grandfather of Daniel Witwicky. Befriends and aids the Autobots after being rescued from the Decepticons by Optimus Prime.
| Spike Witwicky | More Than Meets the Eye (Part 1) | The Rebirth, Part 3 | Corey Burton |
Spike Witwicky is the son of Sparkplug Witwicky. He spends his whole life helping the Autobots fight the Decepticons. He is the father of Daniel Witwicky and boyfriend, later husband, of Carly Witwicky. Spike is the Headmaster component of Cerebros, who in turn, is the Headmaster of Fortress Maximus.
| Carly Witwicky | The Immobilizer | Nightmare Planet | Arlene Banas |
A technology and chemistry expert, Carly (later Carly Witwicky) is eager to help the Autobots by leaping head-first into danger, displaying skills in scuba diving, speedboat piloting, electronics programming, and stunt driving. She has a science scholarship at MIT. Carly dates and eventually marries Spike Witwicky, becoming the mother of Daniel Witwicky and the daughter-in-law of Sparkplug Witwicky.
| Daniel Witwicky | The Transformers: The Movie | The Rebirth, Part 3 | David Mendenhall |
Daniel Witwicky is the son of Spike Witwicky and Carly Witwicky, and grandson of Sparkplug Witwicky. He befriends Hot Rod and is very close to Wheelie, Grimlock and Arcee.
| Chip Chase | Roll For It | Scramble City | Michael Horton |
| Oil rig workers | More Than Meets the Eye (Part 1) | | Unknown |
A group of workers on an off-shore oil rig, co-workers of Spike and Sparkplug Witwicky. They attempt to fight off the Decepticons who arrive to steal the oil, but fail and are forced to jump off the platform into the ocean, where they are rescued by the Autobots.
| Joe | More Than Meets the Eye (Part 1) | | Peter Cullen |
A power plant worker whose truck was mistaken for a possible Autobot by Thundercracker and Reflector. He and his coworker arrive at the power plant to find it destroyed for building material by the Decepticons, and are driven away by Ravage.
| Frank | More Than Meets the Eye (Part 1) | | Corey Burton |
Coworker of Joe. He was unnamed in the cartoon episode, and remained so until he made a brief appearance (alongside Joe, renamed Tim) in a Transformers/Ghostbusters issue in 2019.
| Sherman Dam power plant workers | More Than Meets the Eye (Part 2) | | Unknown |
Workers at a hydroelectric power plant that is taken over by the Decepticons, who are flooding the river to generate more electricity. At least one worker is named Ed. They are eventually rescued by the Autobots, and led to safety by Spike Witwicky.
| Rocket base workers | More Than Meets the Eye (Part 3) | | Unknown |
When the Decepticons approach a rocket base they are told by captain Cape Carlson to identify themselves, who is inside alongside four of his workers who are dressed in green outfits. After the Decepticons land outside, they are then shot at by the Rocket Base workers, which has no effect at all on them. The Autobots do not show up this time and the Decepticons collect the energon there to take back to their spaceship.
| Solar power plant workers | Transport to Oblivion | | Unknown |
Workers at a solar power plant in a desert, who flee when Decepticons attack the facility. At least one worker is named Ed, whose coworker asks him to turn down his tape deck, not knowing that it is the Decepticon Soundwave
| Hydroelectric facility workers | Roll for it | | Unknown |
Workers at a hydroelectric power generator who flee and phone for help when a group of Decepticons, led by Starscream, raid the facility.
| Police officers | Roll for it | | Unknown |
Police officers who respond to the hydroelectric facility workers' call for help and show up to point their guns at the invading Decepticons. One officer calls them "overgrown bolt buckets" and says that has them covered. Starscream jokes that he is scared and shoots his lasers at them, causing the police to flee.
| Weapons factory workers | Divide and Conquer | | Unknown |
Factory workers constructing weapons for use against the Decepticons. When the Decepticons invade the facility, some workers and guards attempt to fend them off with laser rifles, then flee when that fails.
Genius and friend of Spike Witwicky. An expert in computer programming and electronics, he often works closely with Wheeljack and Perceptor, as well as consulting for human organisations. Chip uses a wheelchair. In later Transformers fiction Chip's intelligence would be used for the second Autobot/Maximal named Prowl.
| Doctor Alcazar | Roll for It | | John Stephenson |
Doctor Alcazar is the head of the anti-matter formula research project at an isolated high-tech laboratory.
| Great Falls hydroelectric power plant workers | SOS Dinobots | | Unknown |
Guards patrolling the outside of the power plant drop their rifles and flee when the Decepticons Skywarp and Thundercracker fly over and fire at them. Inside, radio operators attempt to contact the Autobots via Teletraan I, but are unable to get through, as Ratchet is currently repairing it after the newly created Grimlock wrecked it.
| Indian maharaja | The Ultimate Doom (Part 1): Brainwash | | Don Messick |
The Indian maharaja is a kind and generous member of Indian royalty. Even though he lives off the Malabar Coast in India, he appears to be Caucasian, not Indian. He rebuilt the palace that he owned into a solar power station as a gift to his people, and is attacked by Decepticons looking to steal the electricity it generated. He is rescued by Optimus Prime before Skywarp can follow through on Starscream's order to dispose of him.
| Doctor Arkeville | The Ultimate Doom (Part 1): Brainwash | Countdown to Extinction | Casey Kasem |
Dr. Arkeville is a mad scientist who assisted Megatron in one of his schemes. He used hypno-chips to control the minds of humans to provide slave labor and a human shield for the Decepticons. An attempted doublecross with Starscream ended up with him being wounded and rebuilt into a "mechanical freak" by Starscream's medic droids. Starcream later returned to earth, leaving Arkeville on Cybertron, and what became of him after that is unknown. In Binaltech, Arkeville is a member of the Concurrence.
| Construction workers | Heavy Metal War | | Unknown |
Several construction workers work to placing energy disks to start tapping power from the Earth's magnetic field for heat and electricity when they are suddenly attacked by what appeared to be driverless construction vehicles. The vehicles reveal themselves to be Constructicons before collecting the energy disks and transforming. One of the Constructicons then threatens the construction workers, warning them that if they attempt to interfere, they will be terminated.
| Human slaves | The Ultimate Doom (Part 2): Search | The Ultimate Doom (Part 3): Revival | Unknown |
Humans controlled by implanted hypno-chips, invented by Doctor Arkeville. The first human to have a chip impanted was Sparkplug Witwicky, who Laserbeak had captured. Arkeville later captured many more human slaves, who did the Decepticons' bidding by collecting energon for transport to Cybertron. Sparkplug was among the slaves when they attacked the Autobots. After Wheeljack went to Cybertron, he built a device that was able to counter the hypno-chip mind control, which freed Sparkplug, who had been taken to Cybertron, and the other humans slaves when he had returned to earth.
| Demon Swamp canoers | A Plague of Insecticons | Unknown | |
Three men who are attacked by the Insecticons while canoeing in a jungle area off the coast of Bali known as Demon Swamp. After their canoes are destroyed and bags of grain stolen, they escape and radio for help.
| Bali farmers | A Plague of Insecticons | | Unknown |
A group of men and women who are in a field collecting wheat when the Insecticons show up. One of the farmers cries out "Run! There are monsters in the field!". The Insecticons then eat the wheat and destroy the tractor of a man who says "I knew we should have sprayed the grass!"
| Doctor Frankenstein | Autobot Spike | | Frank Welker |
Doctor Frankestein is a fictional character who conducts unholy experiments in a castle. While Spike recovered from a serious operation that left his mind in the body of Autobot X, he watched a movie on Teletraan I which featured Doctor Frankenstein's attempt to create life. Though a hunched creature warned him that he was creating a monster who would destroy them all, Doctor Frankenstein chose to proceed with his attempt.
| The new Airforce rocket base military and civilian crowd | Autobot Spike | | Unknown |
The military at a new Airforce rocket base are led by a man in a blue Military uniform and has troops who are dressed in green soldier outfits. People who are listening to him give a speech include reporters, who are filming and taking pictures of him, as well as two women with long blonde hair. When the Decepticons attack the base, the military base leader says "We can't let those evil robots sabotage this lodge!" Megatron then claims that he is after the rocket fuel. The Decepticons then trash the base, which injures Spike. The military base leader is later shown giving a countdown to a rocket that is being launched.
| Frankenstein's assistant | Autobot Spike | | Michael Bell |
Frankestein's assistant is a fictional hunchback who works as a laboratory assistant in Doctor Frankenstein's castle. Spike Witwicky, his mind temporarily in the shell of the jury-rigged Autobot X, watched a movie via a television signal routed through Teletraan I. The movie featured Doctor Frankenstein trying to create life from dead tissue in defiance of the sage advice from his lab assistant, whom he clearly held in contempt. Upon the creature's animation and subsequent fit of rage, Frankenstein's assistant indicated to the doctor that his own earlier warnings had been appropriate and the results of the experiment were unsatisfactory. This character is based on the hunchbacked lab assistant in the 1931 Frankenstein film and the Igor stock characters.
| Frankenstein's monster | Autobot Spike | Nightmare Planet | Peter Cullen |
Frankenstein's monster is a monster brought to life by Doctor Frankenstein. While Spike recovered from a serious operation, one that left his mind in the body of Autobot X, he watched a movie on Teletraan I. The movie featured an inanimate being made of mis-matching parts and an evil brain. Doctor Frankenstein's assistant begged him not to reanimate the grotesque parody of life. The doctor, however, believed that the creature would be grateful for the giant and powerful body given to him and vivified the monster. This was one of the creatures conjured up by Daniel Witwicky's dreams and used by the Quintessons to menace Rodimus, Ultra Magnus, Springer and the Predacons.
| Spike's Doctor | Autobot Spike | | Unknown |
Spike's Doctor is a doctor who suggested separating Spike's mind from his body after he was wounded in a Decepticon attack. Sparkplug agreed to the operation, which involved implanting Spike's mind into Autobot X's body, inadvertently causing him to go on a rampage. Spike's doctor was also successful into transferring Spike's mind back into his body after separating it from Autobot X after Spike's body had healed.
| Miners | Changing Gears | | Unknown |
The miners are a few men who get very excited when they find gold while mining. As they wheel it out of the mine that they are in, they are attacked by the Decepticons, who capture them and cause damage to the mines. As one of them avoided capture and retreats to his cabin to contact the Autobots, Megatron allows this, as it was part of his plan.
| Professor Haley | Blaster Blues | | John Stephenson |
Professor Haley is an elderly astronomer. He created the Voltronic Galaxer in an attempt to contact alien life forms, having forgotten that some already dwelt on Earth.
| Lord Chumley | Prime Target | | Peter Renaday |
Lord Chumley is a big time big-game hunter who has captured many unusual creatures and military weapons. He tried to get the ultimate trophy, the head of Optimus Prime. In Binaltech, Lord Chumley is a member of the Concurrence. A version of the character also appears in Transformers: Rescue Bots.
| Football Coach | Triple Takeover | | John Stephenson |
The coach of a college football team who is abducted by the Decepticon Blitzwing to act as his second-in-command, apparently confusing football for some kind of tactical exercise. Threatened into giving advice on military strategy, he suggests a series of football plays, which Blitzwing misinterprets to destructive effect, and is then shut inside a locker.
| Football players | Triple Takeover | | N/A |
A college football team whose practice is interrupted by Blitzwing rolling onto the field in tank form. One player asks the coach what to do and is told to give the ball to the tank. He throws the ball directly into Blitzwing's cannon, who then shoots it at the electronic scoreboard and scores himself two points.
| Train conductor | Triple Takeover | | Unknown |
The train conductor is a man dressed in blue overalls with a grey moustache and beard. He declares his retirement on the spot when the Decepticon Astrotrain pulls up to the train station and declares it to be his new headquarters.
| Fire chief | Auto Berserk | | Unknown |
A fire chief whose response vehicle is mistaken for the short circuited and injured Autobot Red Alert by Ironhide. He is indignant at the manhandling of his car, and after Ironhide apologises and says that "it looked like a friend of his", the firefighter says that there’s "No two ways about it – I gotta take that vacation!".
| Marissa Faireborn | Five Faces of Darkness (Part 3) | The Burden Hardest to Bear | Susan Blu |
An officer and pilot in the Earth Defense Space Forces. She appears in a handful of episodes early in the third season. She is the daughter of Dashiell Faireborn and Alison Hart-Burnett, codenamed Flint and Lady Jaye respectively, former members of the United States Special Missions Force, G.I. Joe. Faireborn was briefly transformed into a baby in the episode "Forever Is a Long Time Coming".
| Peruvian townspeople | Fire on the Mountain | | Unknown |
The Peruvian townspeople live in a mining town located in the Andes, and witness an explosion in the sky caused by Megatron blasting a satellite out of the sky using a crystal found in a nearby temple.
| Luisa | Fire on the Mountain | | Mona Marshall |
In the Andes, a Peruvian girl (not named in episode) helps Spike Witwicky and Bumblebee to destroy the "Crystal of Power" that the Decepticons want to convert into a devastating weapon of destruction.
| Luisa's grandmother | Fire on the Mountain | | Unknown |
After Megatron blew up a satellite with their "Crystal of Power" charged cannon and the explosion is seen over the mountain in the Andes, Luisa's grandmother is afraid that "the ancient gods have returned to punish us". Luisa tells her grandmother that the "ancient gods are history, but if the crystal of power has been rediscovered then we have much to fear".
| Auggie Cahnay | Trans-European Express | | Philip Clarke |
Auggie is a snobbish driver who strives to win the trans-European race from Paris to Istanbul. The Autobots are his rivals, and he does his best to overtake them at any price. But after the Stunticons rob him of his race car, he has to ask the Autobot Bluestreak for help to retrieve it. Some time later he sacrifices his car to defeat Menasor and to save Bluestreak, Tracks, and Bumblebee's lives.
| Doctor Fujiyama | Enter the Nightbird | | Michael Bell |
Doctor Fujiyama, who reportedly is a man of some renown in the scientific world, built a ninja robot. Her name was Nightbird, and her purpose was to benefit mankind. However, the Decepticons stole her and reprogrammed her to be evil, so he locked her away for humanity's protection.
| Shawn Berger | Megatron's Master Plan | | Ed Gilbert |
Shawn Berger is a very rich, grandiloquent man who owns a helicopter, a TV network, a personal army (with tanks), and at least one private spacecraft. But what he really wants is to be Mayor of Central City, and he will sell humanity out to Megatron for it by helping discredit the Autobots. After being double-crossed by Megatron, Berger started helping Spike and the other friends of the Autobots.
| Produce thrower | Megatron's Master Plan (Part 1) | | Bud Davis |
The produce thrower is a citizen of Central City who throws fruit when agitated. He threw tomatoes at Optimus Prime immediately after watching Shawn Berger's supposedly damning evidence of the Autobots' duplicity, demanding that the Autobots "go home!" It is unknown whether he had already purchased the produce prior to the Autobot Day parade, or if he purchased them after watching Berger's footage specifically for the purpose of throwing the tomatoes in indignant anger. As Spike, Sparkplug and Chip Chase left with the Autobots, he accused them of being "lousy Autobot-lovers" and led a mob.
| Justin | Megatron's Master Plan (Part 2) | | Mona Marshall |
Justin is a young child who is interested in the Decepticons and is shown colouring a drawing of Megatron. His lack of "metal-coloured crayons" holds back his interest a tad.
| Mayor of Central City | Megatron's Master Plan, Part 1 | Megatron's Master Plan, Part 2 | Alan Oppenheimer |
The mayor is the duly elected leader of Central City. He won a bitterly contested 1984 election against influential businessman Shawn Berger, who subsequently built the city a solar energy plant. Upon discovering the plant was a fake designed to trap the Decepticons, the mayor called for the Autobots. However, after the mayor's speech was interrupted by a video tape appearing to show the Autobots raiding an oil field, they were arrested and banished from Earth. After the city was taken over by Decepticons, the mayor was put to work as a slave in the power plant. After the Autobots rescued them a second time, the mayor asked them to stay on Earth.
| Kid in Megatron costume | Megatron's Master Plan, Part 2 | | Mona Marshall |
A kid wearing a Megatron costume appeared at the Decepticon Day parade, waving a flag and shouting cheers of pride and joy at his hero. However, Megatron either did not notice him or did not care, as he did not acknowledge the kid in any way.
| The farmer at the well | The Revenge of Bruticus | | Unknown |
The farmer is a man with brown hair who is wearing a hat, a checkered red shirt with black lines, and blue overalls, who when going to his well finds that the water has evaporated due to the Combaticons attempt to send the Earth into the sun. He then sees that a fire has started and calls for help. Protectobot Hot Spot then shows up and puts out the fire.
| City men and women | The Revenge of Bruticus | | N/A |
A line of city men and women are shown standing outside by Protectobot First Aid, who is in his ambulance mode. Then seen are sets of identical looking men running into a freezer room to stay cool as the temperature outside keeps rising due to the earth moving closer and closer towards the sun.
| Prince Jumal/Hassan | Aerial Assault | | Mona Marshall |
Prince Jumal, also known as Hassan, is the ruler of an unspecified Middle Eastern nation (later retconned to be Iran). For a time he lives in a junkyard after being deposed by Ali, eventually returning to power with the hekp of the Aerialbots. In his spare time, he likes tinkering with old cars.
| Ali | Aerial Assault | | Ed Gilbert |
Ali is an underhanded backstabber who became ruler of a small Middle Eastern country by deposing its rightful ruler, Prince Jumal. He allies with the Decepticons, stealing plane parts and smuggling them over the border.
| Welder | Aerial Assault | | Unknown |
While a welder is welding a truck, Prince Jumal offers his help to him by saying "Need any help?, I'm an expert with a welding torch!" After the welder responds by saying "What did you say"? Ali appears, grabs Prince Jumal and says "He says little brats should not meddle with things that don't concern them!" as he throws him into a pile of tires.
| Ali's henchmen | Aerial Assault | | N/A |
Ali's henchmen work for Ali, the temporary ruler of an unnamed Middle Eastern country. They are dressed just like Ali. They raided an airport, dismantling planes to hide in a laundry truck, but they also unknowingly picked up two Aerialbots, Slingshot and Skydive.
| El Presidente | B.O.T | | Roger C. Carmel |
El Presidente, one assumes, either is or was the president of an unknown country. In the present, he operates as an arms dealer.
| Abdul Fakkadi | Five Faces of Darkness (Part 1) | Thief in the Night | Philip L. Clarke |
Abdul Fakkadi (also spelled Faghadi) is the dictator of Carbombya. He is concerned primarily with the accumulation of wealth and keeping "fanatics" and "imperialists" away from Carbombya. Casey Kasem, who was Lebanese-American, objected to the negative portrayal of Arab people in The Transformers, resulting in his departure from the series.
| Dixson | Thief in the Night | | Laurie Faso |
Dixson is a private in the United States Army with a military driver's license. He was giving an Army officer a ride to Fort Knox in a jeep, but the fort was not where he left it, causing considerable confusion between the two soldiers.
| Arabian Sheiks | Five Faces of Darkness (Part 1) | | Unknown |
Three Arabian sheiks are seen among Abdul Fakkadi while he is communicating with Autobot Blaster with his handheld device, who along with Autobot Outback had come to investigate if there were any Decepticons hiding out in Carbombya. As Fakkadi gets frustrated and angry, the Sheiks start giggling, which makes Fakkadi throw his device, thus breaking it.
| Mr. Robbins | B.O.T | | Dan Gilvezan |
Mr. Robbins is a science teacher at Benjamin Franklin Pierce High School. Unfortunately, he has Roland and Martin as students, which makes his classes significantly more dangerous than average.
| Martin and Roland | B.O.T | | Townsend Coleman (Martin); Michael Sheehan (Roland) |
Martin and Roland are two teenagers attending Benjamin Franklin Pierce High School. They sabotage a laser to dangerously increase its output in a classroom demonstration, and in response their science teacher, Mr. Robbins, tells them that he will give them a failing grade if they don't win a blue ribbon in an upcoming science fair.
| Elise Presser | B.O.T | | Samantha Newark |
Elise Presser is a student at Benjamin Franklin Pierce High School assigned to work on a science project with troublemakers Martin and Roland, the trio building a robot they call B.O.T. out of junkyard scraps. Elise is a nerd and more concerned about obeying rules than her classmates. Given they accidentally built a destructive robot powered by Brawl's personality component, she will probably continue to err on the side of caution.
| Professor Terranova | Trans-Europe Express | | Jack Angel |
Professor Terranova is a professional archeologist kidnapped by the Decepticons to locate an artefact in a valley near Istanbul.
| Abdul Ben Faisal | Trans-Europe Express | | Roger C. Carmel |
Abdul Ben Faisal is the greatest sage in all of Istanbul.
| Jeff and Mike | The Insecticon Syndrome | | N/A (Jeff); Walker Edmiston (Mike) |
Jeff and Mike are two park rangers in a United States forest.
| Merrick | Microbots | | Jack Angel |
Merrick is a field archeologist on a dig in South America. He makes bets with his colleague, Joan, on who'll uncover something first at a dig site, and claims to win the bet on discovering a thirteen-hundred-year-old vase.
| Joan | Microbots | | Morgan Lofting |
Joan is a field archeologist on a dig in South America. She likes to make $10 bets with her colleague, Merrick, on who'll uncover something first at a dig site. Immediately after losing the bet, she finds a buried Decepticon space ship.
| Jose | Microbots | | Unknown |
Jose is one of three assistants to the archaeologists Merrick and Joan. He wears a green poncho. While working a dig site, Merrick uncovered a pot estimated to be 1,300 years old and called for Jose's help. Jose and the other assistants stood by watching as Joan discovered a buried spacecraft. The archaeologists were about to open the ship up when they were attacked by Decepticons. The five person archaeology team successfully escaped in two jeeps.
| Rock Band | Blaster Blues | | Unknown |
The Rock Band was seen performing at a rock concert with Spike, Carly, and Blaster in attendance. Enjoying the concert, Spike wished that the rest of the Autobots could hear the music, so Blaster began transmitting to all of them.
| Astoria Carlton-Ritz | The Girl Who Loved Powerglide | | Laurie O'Brien |
After the death of her father, Astoria Carlton-Ritz inherited his vast fortune as well as his company, Hybrid Technologies. Spoiled rotten, Astoria is mostly a figurehead with little control over the company's goings-on. Instead, she spends most of her time throwing herself lavish parties and wondering why nobody wants to be her friend. She has the bizarre ability to jinx any mechanical device just by coming into contact with it, which is one more reason why she keeps away from her father's company and its equipment. Her father gave her a necklace with a top secret formula and requested she never take the necklace off. Astoria also has a thing for Powerglide.
| Professor Greene | Desertion of the Dinobots (Part 1) | | Peter Renaday |
Professor Greene is a scientist who just wants to help the Autobots defend Earth against the Decepticons. To this end, he invented the Ultra Plane, an unmanned drone aircraft which can be operated remotely.
| Princess Nimue | A Decepticon Raider in King Arthur's Court | | Joy Grdnic |
Princess Nimue is a human who lived in the countryside some distance from the city of Camelot in the mid-sixth century. The devoted daughter of a feudal lord, Sir Aetheling the Red, she is a bit of a spit-fire and slightly flighty.
| Sir Wigend du Blackthorne | A Decepticon Raider in King Arthur's Court | | Michael Chain |
Sir Wigend du Blackthorne is a hotheaded young noble in sixth-century England who allies himself to the Decepticons, and lives to regret it, as he changes sides.
| Sir Wulf | A Decepticon Raider in King Arthur's Court | | Jack Angel |
Sir Wulf is a subject of Sir Wigend du Blackthorne who decides to betray his lord and side with Starscream.
| Sir Aetheling the Red | A Decepticon Raider in King Arthur's Court | | Jack Angel |
Sir Aetheling the Red is a feudal lord in the year 542 on Earth and is father to Princess Nimue. He rules lands adjacent to rival lord Sir Wigend du Blackthorne in the countryside far from Camelot and enjoys a good joust.
| Beorht | A Decepticon Raider in King Arthur's Court | | Corey Burton |
Beorht is an elderly wizard who lived during the 6th century AD in Britain. He created the Dragon Mound, which is a mystical artifact that can support time travel.
| Deore | A Decepticon Raider in King Arthur's Court | | Unknown |
Lady Deore helps run the household of Sir Aetheling the Red. Lady Deore was overseeing other women working on tapestries inside the castle while Aetheling was speaking with time-displaced Autobots outside.
| Baseball teams | Child's Play | | Unknown |
Two baseball teams are ambushed by Deceptions, who force the stadium to be evacuated and attempt to set up a space bridge. Optimus Prime and several other Autobots arrive to save the humans, only to be sucked into a portal along with many of the Decepticons.
| Audience at the baseball game | Child's Play | N/A | |
The baseball stadium is full with fans who watch the baseball game and the conflict between the Autobots and Decepticons.
| General manager | Child's Play | Unknown | |
An adult male general manager is heard angrily saying "As General manager of this stadium, I demand that you allow us to play ball!" But Megatron and his Decepticons couldn't care less about how he feels about it.
| Daina | Prime Target | | Morgan Lofting |
Daina, Oktober Guard One, is a member of the Soviet Union's daring, highly trained special mission force, the Oktober Guard.
| Dinsmoore | Prime Target | | Alan Oppenheimer |
Dinsmoore is Lord Chumley's somewhat addled manservant. Aged to the point of decrepitude, he has painful memories of the Boer War, and is no longer able to pour tea straight.
| Sōji Yoshikawa | Kremezeek! | Transformers: Kiss Players | Walker Edmiston |
Doctor Sōji Yoshikawa (吉川惣司) works at Shibuya Manufacturing (渋谷電気工業製作所). He is very gifted in science and technology, able to brainstorm with the Autobots on a competent level.
| Marty Minkler | Starscream's Brigade | | Philip L. Clarke |
Marty Minkler is a television reporter. His attention to detail is somewhat lacking.
| Raoul | Make Tracks | Auto-Bop | Michael Chain |
Raoul is a break-dancing street punk carjacker with a bandana, a mullet-ponytail, a rhinestone-studded leather jacket and a heart of gold. He befriends the Autobot Tracks after "stealing" the beat-up car from the middle of the street and repairing him.
| Geddis brothers | Make Tracks | | Michael McConnohie (Jim); Chris Latta (Phil) |
The Geddis brothers are a pair of two-bit New York-based gangsters, who are not beyond selling their own race out to the Decepticons for a quick buck. They specialize in converting stolen cars.
| Director | Hoist Goes Hollywood | | Alan Oppenheimer |
The Director knows exactly what makes a good film when he sees it. It might be some great stunt work, awesome explosions, or giant transforming robots, he will film it and put it in his film (and change the script to make it fit)! Just don’t bug him with the details. Kept on calling Hoist "Moist".
| Assistant director | Hoist Goes Hollywood | | Bud Davis |
The assistant director's job was chiefly to follow the director around and agree with him a lot. Occasionally, he had original ideas, but the director tried to discourage that sort of thing.
| Production assistant | Hoist Goes Hollywood | | Susan Blu |
Spike and Carly encountered the production assistant rummaging through film reels. She explained that someone seemed to have stolen some of the scenes from the workprint. Carly had to point out to her that they could make more copies from the negatives.
| Karen Fishook | Hoist Goes Hollywood | | Susan Blu |
Karen Fishook is an actress who bears a strong resemblance to Carrie Fisher.
| Harold Edsel | Hoist Goes Hollywood | | Ed Gilbert |
Harold had the bad luck of "starring" in a science fiction film along with Karen Fishook whose director became obsessed with using Hoist and several of the Autobots as his main characters (likely saving loads on his FX budget). He bears a strong resemblance to the actor Harrison Ford.
| Poplock | Auto-Bop | | Frank Welker |
Poplock is a member of the Bop Crew. In case his costume is not 1980s enough to get into nightclubs, under his clothing he wears an additional shirt which is even more lurid. Like Raoul, he has a predilection for making pop culture references.
| Rocksteady | Auto-Bop | | T. K. Carter |
Rocksteady is a member of the Bop Crew. He's got some sharp moves. How sharp? He keeps his hat on while he break-dances, and it never falls off! He seems to be the most pragmatic of the trio, but is easily distracted by opportunities to show off his dance moves.
| Furg | Auto-Bop | | Chris Latta |
Furg was utilized by Starscream to frighten off and/or dispose of people who interfered with the flow of customers into the Dancitron nightclub, which apparently included going after innocent breakdancers. He led a gang of roughly fifteen punks and one mind-controlled businessman in performing his strongarm sidewalk defense. Furg's equipment, presumably furnished by the Decepticons, included at least two laser pistols and a communications device featuring a video display.
| Stylish man | Auto-Bop | | Casey Kasem |
The stylish man is a New Yorker on the forefront of fashion trends. He was hanging out at Dancitron when Tracks and Blaster entered the nightclub. Assuming that they were humans, the stylish man admired their fancy suits, asking Tracks if he'd gotten the outfit in Soho. When Tracks responded "Cybertron", the stylish man fished for an address, but Tracks walked away, distracted by the oddly-attired people he'd spotted.
| Lippo the Clown | The Killing jar | | Tony Pope |
Lippo the Clown is the host of a TV show that Wreck-Gar watches. He states "Remember boys and girls, the best way to get your way is to be good every day", which Wreck-Gar repeats. A hologram of Lippo the Clown was used by the Quintessions intro tricking Wreck-Gar into boarding their spaceship.
| Blonde-haired aerobics woman | The Big Broadcast of 2006 | | Unknown |
The blonde-haired aerobics woman wears a mostly purple aerobics outfit and says "Kick high, 2,3,4, be a winner!" The phrase is repeated by both Wreck-Gar and Galvatron as "I'm a winner, I'm a winner, I believe in me."
| Dutch | Only Human | | Jack Angel |
Dutch is Victor Drath's right-hand man. As a thug, he is slightly cleverer than Drath's other men, though that is not saying much.
| Victor Drath | Only Human | | Philip L. Clarke |
Victor Drath is a successful crime lord in the far-flung future of 2006. Not successful enough though, a shortfall he blames on the meddling Autobots.
| Chief Turran | Only Human | | Buster Jones |
Chief Turan is apparently the Chief of Police of New York City in the year 2006. He sometimes works with the Autobots on police matters.
| Michelle | Only Human | | Susan Blu |
Though she is the girlfriend of noted mobster Victor Drath, Michelle does not object to spending the night with random strangers who turn up wounded on her doorstep. Her motivations occasionally seem somewhat unclear.
| Dirk Manus | Money is Everything | | Charlie Adler |
Dirk Manus is a handsome rogue who will charm off your socks. He is also a liar and a scoundrel—do not believe anything he says, especially if there is likely to be money in it. While you're being charmed, he will be making arrangements to steal the contents of your bank account. He has his own ship, the Lazy Sue (which he probably won in a game of space poker), and hails from Epsilon Ariadne. EDC officer Marissa Faireborn has a thing for him.
| Doctor Harding | Attack of the Autobots | | Morgan Lofting |
Doctor Harding designed a solar satellite equipped to capture solar radiation while in orbit and somehow channel that energy back to earth. She has lofty goals for that energy to be used by the entire world.
| Dr. Paul Gates | Day of the Machines | | Ken Sansom |
Dr. Paul Gates is an American scientist working for Quantum Laboratories. He expressed worries about losing control of TORQ III, which Megatron reprogrammed to take over the world. TORQ III first took control of the facility, locking Gates in his office until he was rescued by the Autobots. After TORQ III was disabled, Gates provided a prototype hydrofoil to the Autobots, allowing them to reach the Decepticons' oil platform. Gates later stated that he would not reactivate TORQ III until he could be made absolutely tamper-proof.
| Dr. Carl Andrews | Day of the Machines | | Don Messick |
Dr. Carl Andrews is a scientist working for Quantum Laboratories and a colleague of Dr. Paul Gates. When Gates expressed concern about their new supercomputer, TORQ III, and how it could possibly be too powerful, Andrews assured him that it was justified in the name of the pursuit of knowledge. However, while the two were talking, Megatron reprogrammed TORQ III, and the computer locked them in Gates's office. Both Andrews and Gates were later rescued from the office by Optimus Prime.
| Jeff | War of the Dinobots | | Frank Welker |
Jeff is an astronomer who works at an observatory and apparently is a friend of Chip Chase.
| Menonian humans | Madman's paradise | | N/A |
On the planet Menonia there is a human population. How they arrived there or what might be their purpose there is unknown.
| Jessica Morgan | The Return of Optimus Prime | | Joy Grdnic |
A scientist on a deep space mission along with her partner, Gregory Swafford, who she convinces to rescue the body of Optimus Prime from his ship, inadvertently coating their own ship with strange spores in the process. On returning home Jessica's father, Dr. Mark Morgan, discovers that the spores fill any living thing with destructive rage. Immediately after, Decepticons attack the laboratory, and Jessica is paralysed from the waist down by falling rubble. Though the Autobots build her an exosuit that enables Jessica to walk again, Dr. Morgan and Gregory force her to lure the Autobots into a trap as revenge, infecting them with spores from Optimus Prime's body. After Optimus is brought back to life, Jessica goes with him, Sky Lynx, Kup, Blurr, Goldbug, and Blaster to Charr to find Galvatron and get the metal she, her father, and Swafford were working on so that Optimus can be covered with it and retrieve the Matrix of Leadership from within Rodimus.
| Gregory Swofford | The Return of Optimus Prime | | Jered Barclay |
Gregory Swofford has been wounded both inside and out due to his past experiences with the Transformers. A vengeful scientist, he blames Optimus Prime for his scarred face, but was unwittingly instrumental in bringing the Autobot leader back to life. He is a professional partner to Dr. Mark Morgan, and has a professional, and perhaps romantic, relationship with Morgan's daughter, Jessica.
| Mark Morgan | The Return of Optimus Prime | | Aron Kincaid |
Mark Morgan is a scientist and devoted father to his daughter Jessica. In the future year of 2007, Morgan works in the fields of metallurgy, robotics and palynology. He has a pathological hatred of Transformers, both Autobots and Decepticons, which he shares with his professional partner Gregory Swofford.
| Bonnie Carlson | The Return of Optimus Prime (Part 1) | | Joy Grdnic |
Bonnie Carlson is a news anchor for KSUN TV. She cites information that the Hate Plague is spreading wide and fast.
| Hate Plague infected humans | The Return of Optimus Prime (Part 1) | The Return of Optimus Prime (Part 2) | N/A |
After the Hate Plague was brought back to Earth and was spread to both the Autobots and Decepticons, it was then spread to the human race all across the earth as well. When Optimus Prime discovered that wisdom was the cure to the Hate Plague, he then unleashed the wisdom of the Matrix of Leadership, which spread all across the globe curing all the Hate Plague infected humans and everything else that had been infected by the Hate Plague.
| Barbarians | Dinobot island (part 2) | | N/A |
While Spike was with the Autobots at the library to get books about information about dinosaurs, they see a time warp that has opened, which has barbarians riding woolly mammoths coming out of it. They start to cause much damage by destroying things, during which Spike and Bumblebee get buried under a ton of rubble. The Autobots are able to get control of the barbarians and woolly mammoths and safely make them go back through the time warp, which then closes keeping them in their own time.
| Pirates | Dinobot island (part 2) | | Unknown |
While a man is steering his boat with two other people on board, a time warp opens with a pirate ship coming through with a few pirates on board, who includes a dark-skinned bald man with earrings, wearing no shirt, and swinging a chain. The pirate leader then states that he is wanting the man's ship and passengers. Lucky for him, the Autobots show up and destroy the pirates' weapons and send the ship back through the time warp.
| Wild West Outlaws | Dinobot island (part 2) | | Unknown |
As a group of bikers are riding their motorcycles, five cowboys who are running from the law come through a time warp. One of them states he wants the bikers' motorbikes, which he calls mechanical horses. One cowboy attempts to ride one of the motorcycles, but gets thrown off while he tries. The Autobots show up and as the cowboys try to flee they get forced back through the time warp by the Autobots.
| Motorcycle gang members | Dinobot island (part 2) | | N/A |
The bikers are a group of five men who encounter five cowboys at a time warp. The biker who may be their leader has long grey hair and a beard and wears sunglasses. The other bikers who also have facial hair appear to be younger than him.
| Man and two women on sailboat | Dinobot island (part 2) | | N/A |
The people who the pirates were after were a man steering a ship wearing a captain's hat and two bikini clad woman who were his passengers. What the man's relationship with the women is unknown.
| French Gang | The Ultimate Weapon | | N/A |
Roving French street gang made up of four people in the Netherlands consisting of three adults males with mustaches and one female who are wearing striped shirts, a hat, and berets while running throw grenades at a windmill for no known reason, which causes an explosion while they continue to run.
| Windmill people | The Ultimate Weapon | | N/A |
After the windmill had grenades thrown at it, a man and woman come out of it, dressed in green army outfits, who are holding pistols. Then they shoot at the French street gang, and start coughing due to the smoke left from the explosion caused by the grenades.
| Orange Tree fruit pickers | The Ultimate Weapon | | Unknown |
The orange tree fruit pickers are a boy with brown hair and a girl with blonde hair who are perhaps brother and sister and are up in an orange tree picking oranges and dropping them into the basket of a man with dark skin with grey hair and a mustache, who is standing next to an elderly woman with a long dress, who may be his wife and may be related to the boy and the girl. As the man claims that he never missed anything that is dropped into his basket, Decepticon Trypticon shows up and attempts to step on the four people. As the girl screams in terror the man grabs the boy and girl and all four of the people run. As this happens three male police officers show up.
| Three male police officers | The Ultimate Weapon | | N/A |
After the three male police officers show up and get out of their vehicles they shoot their pistols at Trypticon, which has no effect on him. After he steps on their cars, which destroys them, they also run away in terror from him.
| Old peace delegates | Surprise Party | | N/A |
The old peace delegates are both adult male and female humans who are seen on Cyberton when Wheelie and Daniel Whitwicky, who are seeking information about the creation date of Ultra Magnus, walk into the Hall of Records, which is located in the city of Iacon.
| EDC Worker | Forerver Is A Long Time Coming | | N/A |
The EDC (Earth Defense Center) worker had greeted Marrisa Fairborne by saying "Good evening Captain Fairborn, standard target run?". Fairborn responded "Try level three, I feel like a challenge, tonight!" and starts shooting at a giant hologram of Cyclonus. After a time disturbance occurs by a time window, the EDC worker hears a baby crying and turns around to see that Marrisa Fairborne is now a baby again, and says "Captain Fairborn?!"
| Ozu | The Burden Hardest to Bear | | Neil Ross |
Ozu is a kendo student who lives in Japan. When the Autobots protected the dojo from the Decepticons, Ozu thanked them along with his sensei. Ozu later battled with his sensei, only to lose his weapon and be berated by his sensei for not focusing on the battle. When the Decepticons launched an attack on Ozu's home city, Ozu protected an elderly woman from Scourge with his katana. Ozu and the woman were then saved by Hot Rod, who defeated Scourge and took back the Matrix of Leadership, becoming Rodimus Prime once more. Hot Rod then offered Ozu and the woman a ride home, which they accepted.
| Ozu's sensei | The Burden Hardest to Bear | | Philip L. Clarke |
Ozu's sensei is a kendo instructor who lives and teaches in Japan. When the Autobots protected the dojo from the Decepticons, the sensei and his students thanked them. The sensei later berated Ozu for not focusing on their battle, explaining to Hot Rod that if one thinks of winning, they automatically consider the possibility of losing, which in turn leads to a fear that prevents victory.
| Old Japanese lady | The Burden Hardest to Bear | | Susan Blu |
The old Japanese lady is a senior citizen of Japan. When the Decepticons attacked the city, the old lady was saved from Scourge by Ozu, a kendo student. Ozu and the old lady were then trapped in an alleyway, though were saved from Scourge once again by Hot Rod, who reclaimed the Matrix of Leadership. Rodimus Prime offered Ozu and the old lady a ride home, which they accepted. Both Ozu and the old lady subsequently witnessed Rodimus' official return to Primeship.
| Melkorr | The Quintesson Journal | | Joe Leahy |
Melkorr made one appearance in the episode "The Quintesson Journal", in which he narrated a video clip depicting the history of violence between Xetaxxis and Lanarq during a peace conference between the warring planets. He then emphasized that both civilizations would go extinct "within one generation" unless the peace negotiations were successful, leading Rodimus Prime to sarcastically thank him.
| Possum Brown | The Key to Victor Sigma, Part 1 | | Unknown |
Possum Brown is a trucker who was warned by one of his fellow truckers that he had two smokies on his tail. The police pursuit was brought to an abrupt end when Rumble landed on the back end of Possum's Kenworth K100 Aerodyne Sleeper Tractor Trailer truck and dispatched the two patrol cars with some laser fire. Rumble then crashed through the truck cab's side window and ejected Possum Brown from the truck. The truck was taken to Megatron to be rebuilt into the Stunticon leader Motormaster.
| Bank robbers and car driver | The Key to Victor Sigma, Part 1 | | Unknown |
Two adult male bank robbers who run out of a bank carrying bags of money and wearing white masks around their mouths get into their Ferrari 308 GTB car, while the bank alarm sounds. As they drive away Rumble flies down and opens the door of the vehicle. As the driver of the vehicle who has grey hair, a moustache, and is wearing an orange hardhat cries out "I'll go straight, I'll do anything, take the money!" Rumble replies "I just want the car!" as he throws the driver from the vehicle. The vehicle was taken to Megatron to be rebuilt into the Stunticon Wildrider.
| Racecar Drivers, Commentators, and Audience | The Key to Victor Sigma, Part 1 | | Unknown |
During a racecar event featuring many racecars with drivers whose names are not known, one of the two commentators says "Muller takes it" who is the lead (and whose name is known). Rumble swoops down and removes him from the yellow racecar that he is driving, while the commentators and audience watch on in shock. The yellow racecar is then taken back to Megatron to be rebuilt into the Stunticon Wildrider.
| Military base soldiers | The Key to Victor Sigma, Part 1 | The Key to Victor Sigma, Part 2 | Unknown |
After the Stunticons had been returned to earth after being given life by Vector Sigma on Cybertron they attacked and caused great damage to a military base where there were soldiers who were protecting superfuel. A soldier then said "I don't believe it, who are they?" The general then responded, "There is nobody driving those cars, it can only mean one thing, they must be the Autobots!" When the Autobots later arrived at the base, they were attacked by the soldiers. Optimus Prime told the general "that the government gave them a sample of the superfuel, why would they want to take it?". The general responds "Your cars made mincemeat out of this place a few hours ago". The Stunticons then return to the base and attacke the Autobots, and the soldiers and general then learned that it is not the Autobots who attacked the base.
| Father and daughter in the living room | The Key to Victor Sigma, Part 2 | | Unknown |
After being given life by Vector Sigma on Cybertron and arriving on Earth, the newly created Aerialbots back at The Ark watch a TV show where a young daughter with brown hair and pigtails says to her middle-aged father "She (mostly likely meaning her mother) had to go buy new furniture, don't!" as he sits on a chair that breaks. The Aerialbot then turns off the show saying that he "can't stand it".

== Nebulans ==
Nebulans are humanoid aliens from the planet Nebulos who co-operate with the Transformers. Some Nebulans have allied with the Autobots, others with the Decepticons. The Nebulans' first and last appearance was in the three-part episode The Rebirth, which was intended as the pilot episode of the fourth season, but ended up being the season's only episode and the last episode in the entire series.

=== Nebulan Headmasters ===
The Nebulans who co-operate with the Headmasters transform into the Transformers' heads.

| Name | Alternate mode | First and Last appearances | | Voiced by |
|---|---|---|---|---|
| Arcana | Brainstorm's Head | The Rebirth (Part 1) | The Rebirth (Part 3) | Jack Angel |
For a man whose work has had such a big effect on the lives of so many Nebulans and Transformers, very few people really know the distant and remote Arcana. Not even Brainstorm, who shares his psyche, can claim to truly fathom the workings of his partner's mind. But then, Arcana seems to cultivate an extremely anti-social persona unintentionally, training first as a medical doctor, only to grow bored and focus on long-forgotten and repudiated scientific lore of his planet, earning the ire of medical colleagues. Yet it was this combination of knowledge and skill, along with the combined input of his future partner, that allowed the creation of the Binary Bonding process.
| Stylor | Chromedome's Head | The Rebirth (Part 2) | | Milt Jamin |
Stylor is gorgeous. Always impeccably dressed and groomed and always in the latest style. He spends most of his time primping and polishing either Chromedome or himself, and is renowned on Nebulos for his exquisite taste and dashing good looks. Though he loves the ladies, he surprisingly does not have the greatest luck there, since few want to spend much time with a man who's so focused on being prettier than they are. It is suspected that Stylor volunteered for the Headmaster process simply because it was trendy at the time, his Autobot partner Chromedome, being an inveterate academic and computer nerd, is something of a frustration to Stylor, but he does his best to bring out the big guy's cooler, more social side (which he figures MUST be in there somewhere). Chromedome in return tries to get Stylor to be a little less superficial.
| Duros | Hardhead's Head | The Rebirth (Part 1) | The Rebirth (Part 3) | Charlie Adler |
Duros was born to be a soldier on a world without war. He served for years as the head of security for the Nebulan Ruling Council and spent most of that time horribly bored and unsatisfied. Duros is close friends with Hardhead, with the two bonding over their shared interest in combat and warfare.
| Gort | Highbrow's Head | The Rebirth (Part 1) | The Rebirth (Part 3) | Michael Bell |
The all-American boy of the Nebulan Headmasters, Gort rose up from a lowly position as stable boy to courageous defender of his planet. The idealistic teenager never has an unkind word for anybody and serves as a shining example of the best the Nebulan Headmasters have to offer, it is a pity, then, that Gort was partnered with his polar opposite, the elitist snob Highbrow, who takes considerable offense to being binary bonded with what he sees as a mere commoner. Their pairing is among the worst of the Autobot Headmasters, often detracting, not adding, to Highbrow's effectiveness in combat as he refuses to listen to Gort's suggestions except in all but the most life-threatening situations.
| Grax | Skullcruncher's Head | The Rebirth (Part 2) | | Milt Jamin |
A ruthless businessman and industrialist, Grax was willing to do whatever it took to solidify his place at the top of Nebulan business world. Not that he needed much convincing to undergo the binary bonding process to combine with Skullcruncher to eliminate his business rivals, the Decepticon methods of utterly and cruelly absorbing all foes were just more literally bloody versions of Grax's own. Skullcruncher did not see the similarity though, Nebulan corporate types were barely even a snack. Grax adds considerably to the somewhat slow mind of Skullcruncher, which admittedly is not difficult, but still finds most of his suggestions ignored unless they involve eating the corpses of your enemies or inventive noises to make when grinding your teeth.
| Vorath | Mindwipe's Head | The Rebirth (Part 2) | | Charlie Adler |
Vorath was the former Minister of Science of the planet Nebulos. A Zarak loyalist, Vorath was expelled from his office when Galen uncovered his involvement in illegal medical experiments on live subjects. Seeking revenge, Vorath gained the chance to do so and continue his experiments with the arrival of Transformers and the creation of the Headmasters, when he agreed to binary bond to Mindwipe.
| Monzo | Weirdwolf's Head | The Rebirth (Part 2, 3) | | Neil Ross |
On Nebulos, Monzo was a professional hyperwrestler before he became a nightclub owner. He is a brutal fellow who does not appreciate the fine art of tactics or strategy. He especially hates poetry, which puts him at odds with his Headmaster partner, Weirdwolf. However, they both find common ground in wanting to beat stuff up.
| Spasma | Apeface's Head/Monkey Head | The Rebirth (Part 2) | | Tony St. James |
The nervous and insecure Spasma was the son of a despised noble family on Nebulos, bullied and picked on his entire life while being crushed under the weight of a bankrupt family legacy. The arrival of the Transformers on his planet and the creation of the Headmasters gave him the prospect of power to escape his feeling of inadequacy. Spasma had his wish fulfilled when he was binary bonded to Apeface, literally becoming the kind of bully who had previously tormented him.
| Krunk | Snapdragon's Head/ Dragon Head | The Rebirth (Part 2) | | Christopher Collins |
Krunk is Zarak's nasty, brutish bodyguard. He takes orders from Zarak without question, no matter how illegal or rotten they are, as Snapdragon's Headmaster, he enhances the Decepticon's thuggish personality rather nicely. Two peas in a pod, really.
| Daniel Witwicky | Exosuit/Arcee's Head | The Transformers: The Movie | The Rebirth (Part 3) | David Mendenhall |
Daniel Witwicky is the human son of Spike and Carly Anderson-Witwicky. He is approximately 12 years of age in 2005, and was presumably born sometime between 1990 and 1993. He is the grandson of Sparkplug Witwicky. Daniel often gets into trouble, which requires either his father or the Autobots to save him. He is very good friends with the Autobots, particularly Wheelie, Grimlock, and Hot Rod, but the one he is closest to is Arcee, who views him as a surrogate son. Daniel is (sometimes) the Headmaster partner to Arcee.

=== Nebulan Targetmasters ===
The Nebulans who co-operate with the Targetmasters transform into the Transformers' weapons.

| Name | Alternate mode | First and Last appearances | | Voiced by |
|---|---|---|---|---|
| Haywire | electro-laser cannon | The Rebirth (Part 1) | The Rebirth (Part 3) | Rob Paulsen |
One of the younger Nebulans to binary bond to a Transformer, Haywire is very much of the "act first, think later"-impulsive-teenage mold. In that respect, the relationship between Haywire and his partner Blurr is one where they get on like a house on fire, but also a classic example of the lack of planning in the early stages of Targetmasters bonding for how effective a combat team they would make. Transforming into an electro-laser cannon, Haywire is just as hyperactive as his partner in combat, often more concerned with how often he fires than where he is aiming or how effective his shots are.
| Pinpointer | Pistol | The Rebirth (Part 1) | The Rebirth (Part 3) | Frank Welker |
Pinpointer is a Nebulan of few words. He is binary bonded to Crosshairs.
| Firebolt | electrostatic Discharge rifle | The Rebirth (Part 1) | The Rebirth (Part 3) | Dick Gautier |
Firebolt was once a quiet scholar on the pacifistic planet of Nebulos, where he was renowned as one of its top atomic physicists. Beneath his meek and reserved exterior, however, young Firebolt yearned for a life of action and excitement. His dreams of adventure might never have come true, if not for the intervention of the Decepticons. When the call went out for Nebulans who would be willing to take up arms in defense of their planet, Firebolt was amongst the first to volunteer. Undergoing the extensive and painful procedure known as Binary bonding, Firebolt was given a special suit of black and grey armour and granted the power to transform himself into a powerful double-barreled weapon called an "electrostatic discharge rifle", although eager for the chance to make a difference and have some fun, Firebolt soon found that his own exuberance paled in comparison to his Targetmaster partner: a young Autobot named Hot Rod. Firebolt's opinion of this situation is what could be described as "cautiously optimistic" – he is excited by all the action and adventure of being a Targetmaster, but he is also very nervous at some of the risks that Hot Rod insists on taking at times.
| Recoil | musket laser rifle | The Rebirth (Part 1) | The Rebirth (Part 3) | Johnny Haymer |
One of the older Nebulans to join the Autobots, Recoil was a former All-World Prismaball champion on his home planet, until age finally caught up with him. While helping to keep Nebulos safe is part of why he agreed to undergo binary bonding to become a Targetmaster, a large part was to prove to himself as much as to others that he still had what it takes. Transforming into a version of Kup's original old-style musket laser, Recoil has found a good match with the crusty Autobot, both seeking the respect they feel their age and experience deserves.
| Peacemaker | Sonic blaster | The Rebirth (Part 2,3) | | Steve Bulen |
Peacemaker is an upbeat, almost contagiously positive Nebulan police officer. He keeps trying to cheer up his Autobot partner Pointblank to little result.
| Spoilsport | Double cannon | The Rebirth (Part 2,3) | | Danny Mann |
Spoilsport has a rather appropriate moniker, given that he spoils the fun of his partner Sureshot by being an equally good marksman. In a contest between an intelligent gun and an intelligent gunner, the gun gets a majority vote. His partner resents his interference, and in his turn, the Nebulan resents Sureshot for his lack of appreciation. It cannot help that Sureshot is a jerk, of course, and presumably he never calls.
| Nightstick | Beam gun | The Rebirth (Part 2,3) | | Peter Cullen |
Back on Nebulos, Nightstick was a master criminal. For some reason, he gave that up to undergo binary-bonding to Cyclonus. The loyal and honorable Decepticon warrior often finds himself at odds with the very dishonorable Nightstick and generally considers him an irritating pest.
| Aimless | beam gun | The Rebirth (Part 2) | | Milt Jamin |
Aimless should have been called "Useless". This Nebulan's success rate when he tries to hit a target is unknown, because that would require him to, you know, actually try. Together with his Targetmaster partner Misfire, he is a danger to himself and others. Mostly others.
| Fracas | Incendiary cannon | The Rebirth (Part 2) | | Neil Ross |
Fracas' new Targetmaster body allows him to transform into an incendiary cannon for his new Decepticon partner Scourge—fitting, since Fracas is himself a hot-running, volatile scrapper who explodes into violent rages.
| Caliburst | Lange barrel gun | The Rebirth (Part 2) | | Johnny Haymer |
Like his binary bonded partner Slugslinger, Caliburst is merely putting on an act and playing the role of the cold and fearless Decepticon warrior he outwardly projects; it is just that he is generally more adept at keeping the mask up because of his former life as an actor. While not a good actor, more the kind to be found in the freezer section next to the other pork products, Caliburst does know the importance of staying in character. Given that he joined the Transformer conflict for the money because there was no one left on Nebulos that could stomach appreciate his "talent", he has an incentive to not screw up, Slugslinger treats his partner fairly well, mostly due to the direct link between the condition of the Decepticon's backbone infrastructure in combat and the condition of his weaponry.
| Blowpipe | Compression cannon | The Rebirth (Part 2,3) | | John Moschitta, Jr. |
The conniving brother-in-law of Lord Zarak, Blowpipe managed the political campaign that brought him and kept him in power. While a smooth political operator with endless connections, Blowpipe lacks the physical presence and style of a leader, causing him to resent his brother-in-law for taking all the glory when he did all the "real" work, treating combat like he would a political campaign, Blowpipe plots and plans things in advance, leaving nothing to chance, which puts him at odds with his binary bonded partner Triggerhappy, whose idea of combat tactics is to wave his gun around randomly as fast as he can and shoot really, really fast.

== Other characters ==
| Name | Alternate mode | First and Last appearance | | Voiced by |
|---|---|---|---|---|
| Omega Supreme | Rocket, tank, and Launch Bay | Blaster Blues | The Big Broadcast of 2006 | Jack Angel |
Omega Supreme is a large Autobot who was the guardian of Crystal City and was friends with the Constructicons. After the Constructicons were reprogrammed, they lead Omega Supreme into a trap, resulting in him being partially reprogrammed and seeking revenge on the Constructicons.
| The Sharkticons | N/A | The Transformers: The Movie | The Return of Optimus Prime (Part 2) | Frank Welker (in "The Return of Optimus Prime" Pt. 1), Roger C. Carmel (Movie), Bud Davis (in "The Quintesson Journal"), Jim Cummings (in "Money is Everything") |
The Sharkticons are humanoid robots resembling sharks who serve the Quintessons. They possess powerful teeth and tails.
| Sharkticon pit executioners | N/A | The Transformers: The Movie | Five Faces of Darkness, Part 4 | N/A |
Sharkticon pit executioners are a type of Sharkticon who stand at the top of the Sharkticon pit and after they are given orders to toss the condemned victim or victims into the pit, then pull the lever sending the victim to fall downwards into the pit where they are usually consumed by the Sharkticons. When Rodimus Prime travelled into the Autobot Matrix of Leadership, he saw that they had existed along with the Quintessons millions of years ago on Cybertron and were seen fleeing from Cybertron with the Quintessons after they had been driven away by their former slaves.
| Deceased robots remains | Unknown | The Transformers: The Movie | | N/A |
After Kup and Hot Rod are captured by the Allicons and placed in the holding cells on the planet Quintessia, ruined robots remains of a few different colours are seen in the cells of both them and cell next to them that Kranix is in. Who these robots once were, and exactly why their remains were in the cells is unknown. They probably were destroyed by either the Allicons and/or the Sharkticons while trying to escape though.
| Teletraan I | None | More Than Meets the Eye, Part 1 | Five Faces of Darkness, Part 5 | Casey Kasem |
Teletraan I is a semi-sentient computer that runs the Autobots' spaceship/base, the Ark. Teletraan I has extensive communications abilities and can monitor Earth's television and radio broadcasts to search for news that may be of interest to the Autobots, in addition to operating the Sky Shop. Teletraan I is presumably destroyed along with the Ark during the events of "Five Faces of Darkness, Part 5".
| Teletraan II | None | Thief in the Night | Grimlock's New Brain | Frank Welker |
Teletraan II is a supercomputer constructed by the Autobots following the destruction of its predecessor, Teletraan I. It can be easily accessed from both Autobot City and Cybertron. Teletraan II has many roles and capabilities, including recording Autobot activities for later analysis and keeping educational files on both the Autobots and Decepticons.
| TORQ III | None | Day of the Machines | | Gregg Berger |
TORQ III is an advanced supercomputer capable of controlling and building machines. Megatron reprograms TORQ III and ordered the computer to take control of the facility until it is destroyed by Optimus Prime.
| The Quintessons | None | The Transformers: The Movie | The Return of Optimus Prime (Part 2) | Quintesson #1: Regis Cordic (Movie); Quinetesson #2: Roger C. Carmel (Movie); Quintesson #3: Jack Angel; Quintesson #4: Tony Pope (in "The Big Broadcast of 2006", "The Quintesson Journal", and "The Return of Optimus Prime"); Quintesson #5: Paul Eiding (in "The Quintesson Journal"); Quintesson #6: Clive Revill (in "The Return of Optimus Prime"); Quintesson Scientist: Dick Gautier (in "The Killing Jar") |
The Quintessons are an ancient robotic alien race from Cybertron who created the Transformers. Most Quintessons have five faces, with each face having its own mind.
| Ancient Cybertron's military hardware and consumer goods robots | None | Five Faces of Darkness (Part 4) | | N/A |
Military hardware and consumer goods robots were created eons ago by the Quintessons when Cybertron was a factory. They were the ancient ancestors of the Autobots and Decepticons. They were used by the Quintessons for bad reasons. They developed emotions and drove the Quintessons away from Cybertron. The lived together peacefully for some time, but it did not last. The military hardware would go on to become the Deceptions, while the consumer goods would become the Autobots.
| Ghost and unknown robots | None | Five Faces of Darkness (Part 2) | | N/A |
While Rodimus Prime is seemingly near death, he sees a ghost with some sharp teeth, who makes a shrieking sound, and four unknown robots who are different colours, one of which has a shield and two of which have claws instead of hands, standing in a row, who then explode. Whoever these beings are is unknown.
| Ancient Autobots | None | The Burden Hardest to Bear | | Unknown |
When Galvatron inserts the stolen Matrix of Leadersgip into his fusion cannon, ghostly forms of Ancient Autobot leaders, including Optimus Prime, appear and warn him to return the Matrix to its rightful bearer.
| Trannis | Early Cybertronian vehicle | Five Faces of Darkness (Part 4) | | Unknown |
Trannis is a Decepticon warlord who battled Sentinel Prime late in the Second Cybertronian War.
| The ASD-324-ddd-3e3c1 model Decepticons | Unknown | Five Faces of Darkness (Part 4) | | Unknown |
The ASD-324-ddd-3e3c1 model are a type of ancient Decepticon who were active in the generation prior to Megatron and Optimus Prime. This model utilizes a semi-automatic energy rifle with a single rocket mounted on top and laser-guided rocket launchers. The ASD Decepticons remained in service until the invention of Transformation rendered them largely obsolete, a period of almost two million years.
| Prima | Unknown | Five Faces of Darkness (Part 4) | | Neil Ross |
Prima is the second known wielder of the Matrix of Leadership. He was created from the corpse of another robot which the Quintessons deactivated for its underperformance in its tasks. The robot was smelted down and reformed into Prima. Prima was unusual amongst his consumer goods brethren in that he was equipped for combat, and was made to battle in the Quintessons' gladiatorial pits. He found the endless fighting repellent, and, after a battle with Sentinel Major, decided to strike back at his masters, but was shot and apparently killed.
| Prime Nova | Unknown | Five Faces of Darkness (Part 4) | | Milt Jamin |
Prime Nova is the Matrix bearer after Prima. Prime Nova, or Nova Prime, succeeded Prima as bearer of the Matrix of Leadership through unknown circumstances, and went on to fight against the Quintessons in the robot uprising that ultimately forced the evil aliens off of Cybertron. It is unknown if he died during the rebellion or not, but by the time of the first Great War, he had been replaced as Autobot leader by Guardian Prime.
| Sentinel Prime | Early Cybertronian vehicle | Five Faces of Darkness (Part 4) | | Jack Angel |
Sentinel Prime is Optimus Prime's immediate predecessor as Autobot leader. Sentinel Major was originally one of the Quintessons' slave robots on Cybertron around twelve million years ago before he led a rebellion that overthrew the Quintessons. In a later conflict with the Decepticons, Sentinel Prime inherited the Matrix of Leadership and became leader of the Autobots, and invented the Transformers' power of transformation. Sentinel Prime was mortally wounded by Megatron and gave the Matrix to Alpha Trion, who kept it safe until the emergence of Optimus Prime.
| Clone Optimus Prime | 1984 Freightliner FL86 Cab-over | A Prime Problem | | Peter Cullen |
When human ally Spike Witwicky is captured by the Decepticons, the Autobots encounter two Optimus Primes, as Megatron has created an Optimus Prime clone. As the Autobots attempt to rescue him, they must figure out which Optimus Prime is the real Optimus Prime and save Spike's life.
| Clone Starscream | 1975 F-15 Eagle | A Prime Problem | | Chris Latta |
The Autobots encounter a clone of Starscream, which the real Starscream is controlling. He is destroyed by the Clone Optimus Prime to make it seem like it is the true Optimus Prime, which is believed by Trailbreaker, claiming that this must be the real Optimus Prime as he "just destroyed the Decepticons' number two varmint… he can't be working for Megatron".
| Early Autobots and Decepticons | Early Cybertronian vehicles | Desertion of the Dinobots part 2 | | N/A |
After being transported to Cybertron by the Decepticon spacebridge, Spike and Carly come across a room filled with strangely shaped, non-functional robots, which Carly supposes "must be the primitive ancestors of the Autobots". They also find a viewing room where they watch a film showing the battles between the early Autobots and Decepticons.
| Sentinel robots | None | Desertion of the Dinobots part 2 | The Search for Alpha Trion | N/A |
Sentinel robots are combat robots used by Shockwave on Cybertron. They can neither transform nor speak, and can be destroyed very easily, as they are very weak. The Dinobots easily handled them when the arrived on Cybertron after traveling through the Decepticons' spacebridge. Shockwave also destroyed one as he was trying to blast Spike and Carly. The female Autobots later encountered a different Sentinel robot that could fly when they were fleeing from Shockwave. Moonracer was able to destroy it by blasting it with her pistol.
| Pole Vault Transformer | Unknown | Five Faces of Darkness (Part 4) | | N/A |
The pole vault Transformer is an Autobot who lived between the First and Second Cybertronian War. He participated in a pole vault competition that took place in the time of peace between the first two wars. Millions of years later, he helped Wreck-Gar fetch their Autobot allies from Goo. In the year of 2006, he is a member of the Junkion tribe.
| Hood Transformer | Unknown | Five Faces of Darkness (Part 4) | | N/A |
The Hood Transformer is an Autobot who lived between the First and Second Cybertronian War. Millions of years later, he helped Wreck-Gar fetch their Autobot allies from Goo.
| Guardian Prime | Unknown | Five Faces of Darkness (Part 4) | | Charlie Adler |
Guardian Prime is an ancient Autobot leader who lived between the First and Second Cybertronian War and was once bearer of the Autobot Martix of leadership, and was the fourth leader of the Autobots. Rodimus Prime had come across him after he had entered the matrix. He looks very similar to Rodimus Prime in his design and color patterns.
| Auto Combatant | None | The Transformers: The Movie | | Unknown |
A high-tech training dummy that Hot Rod practices against while on board a ship fleeing Earth. It often takes advantage of Hot Rod's distraction to hit him from behind, and calls for a time out when he retaliantes.
| Quintessia sea creatures | None | The Transformers: The Movie | | N/A |
After Kup and Hot Rod crash on the planet Quintessia, they both end up in murky sea waters containing very large piranha-like fish that Hot Rod fights and saws in half while tangled in giant sea plants. After freeing himself from the giant sea plants and hearing Kup's cry for help, he then finds and defeats the giant squid tearing Kup apart, which spews a large black mist at Hot Rod after being defeated by him.
| Executed orange robot | Unknown | The Transformers: The Movie | | Unknown |
The executed orange robot is seen on the plank in the Quinetessons' court, when the Quinetessons declare him innocent and tell the Sharkticon executioner to feed him to the Sharkticons. After he falls into the Sharkticon pit, he is heard screaming while the Sharktiocons devour him.
| Ancient Cybertronian Constructicons | Unknown | Five Faces of Darkness (Part 4) | | N/A |
The Ancient Cybertronian Constructicons are a team of eight Constructicons who lived on Cybertron millions of years ago, who were seen by Rodimus Prime, through the Autobot Matrix of Leadership, creating Megatron far below a city on Cybertron. Some of them appear to be the same Constructicons who later joined Megatron and formed Devastator (Hook, Scavenger, Bonecrusher, Mixmaster, and Scrapper being visible), while the others are unidentifiable; their individual names and what became of them is unknown.
| Zeta Prime | Unknown | Five Faces of Darkness (Part 4) | | N/A |
Zeta Prime inherited the Matrix of Leadership from Guardian Prime when he was killed during the early days of the war with the Decepticons. His stint as Autobot leader appears to have been a short-lived one, as he died before the end of the war and was succeeded by Sentinel Prime.
| Primon | Unknown | Five Faces of Darkness (Part 4) | | Michael Bell |
Primon is one of the oldest known bearers of the Matrix. He was the earliest documented bearer of the Matrix of Leadership, but how he came to hold the talisman, and his activities during the Quintesson occupation of Cybertron, are unknown.
| Vector Sigma | Corey Burton | None | The Key to Vector Sigma (part 1) | The Rebirth (Part 1) |
Vector Sigma is an ancient super-computer that dwells below the surface of Cybertron. As he lacks the key to Vector Sigma, Alpha Trion activates Vector Sigma by himself and ends up fusing with it. Optimus Prime later uses the Matrix of Leadership to communicate with Alpha Trion, who is now a part of Vector Sigma.
| Arcadroids | None | Five Faces of Darkness (Part 1) | | N/A |
Hailing from the Nalva System, the Arcadroids are spherical aliens who can tuck their legs up and roll along the ground. A group of Arcadroids took part in the first Galactic Olympics on Athenia in the year 2005. Apparently, the bookmakers favoured them in the downhill events. Considering the stadium was completely flat, that did not seem like much of an advantage.
| Athenian beings | None | Five Faces of Darkness (Part 1) | | Unknown |
Beings on the planet Athenia during the first Galactic Olympics are Transformer-like robots who are seen in the audience during the car race between the Autobots. Also in the audience are multi-coloured humanoid aliens who are also doing the commentary for the race and are seen around Jazz after he wins the race.
| The Yellow Autobot | Racecar | Five Faces of Darkness (Part 1) | | N/A |
The Yellow Autobot, who has no known name, competed alongside Jazz in a race at the intergalactic games. He is the last to get going in the race. He may have also have done the worst in the race.
| The Blue Autobot | Racecar | Five Faces of Darkness (Part 1) | | N/A |
The Blue Autobot, who has no known name, competed alongside Jazz in a race at the intergalactic games. He and the Yellow Autobot failed to swing across a gap filled with water and fell in, while Jazz successfully swung over the water and was the winner of the race.
| Unicron | Planet | The Transformers: The Movie | Call of the Primitives | Orson Welles (Movie), Roger C. Carmel (TV series) |
Unicron is an asteroid-sized Transformer whose only goal is to devour small moons, despite his incredible intelligence and power. He is destroyed by Rodimus Prime and the Autobot Matrix of Leadership, but is partially reactivated by Scourge and Starscream.
| Tornedron | Energy Monster Giant Spider | Call of the Primitives | | Neil Ross |
Tornedron is the successor to Unicron, created by Unicron's creator Primacron. Unlike Unicron, Tornedron is an energy-based lifeform, controlled remotely by Primacron. It is designed to consume energy, destroying stars and planets; its ultimate goal is to leave the universe a blank slate for Primacron to do with as he pleases. During his crusade, Tornedron takes the form of a giant spider. Grimlock manages to stop Tornedron, returning all the energy it stole to its original locations and dispersing the entity.
| Hauler | None | More Than Meets the Eye, Part 1 | | N/A |
Hauler is an Autobot crane that shows up just briefly alongside Ratchet and Cliffjumper to pull an injured Hound out of a ravine that he fell into after he was shot by Laserbeak as he was chasing him. Why it was only seen briefly and never made any more appearances is unknown.
| Acid Storm | Cybertronian spacecraft | Divide and conquer | | N/A |
Acid Storm is a Decepticon who is highly intelligent, charismatic, and able to manipulate weather on a small scale to create acid rain. Despite his power, he stays in his role as one of the Rainmakers rather than striking out on his own.
| Ion Storm | Cybertronian spacecraft | Divide and conquer | | N/A |
One of the formidable Rainmakers, Ion Storm is an electrokinetic, able to personally generate EMPs.
| Nova Storm | Cybertronian spacecraft | Divide and conquer | | N/A |
Nova Storm is a member of the Rainmakers who is equipped with armor that enables survival in volcanic environments or even the chromosphere of a star for short periods of time.
| Model Optimus Prime drone | 1984 Freightliner FL86 Cab-over | The Ultimate Doom Part 1 | | N/A |
When a model Optimus Prime drone that was created by Megatron in the Decepticons' underwater headquarters appeared, Starscream gave the orders to attack it, but Megatron told him that it is just a model of their enemy. Spark Plug, who was under slave control, then pushed it over.
| Watchdogs | None | The Ultimate Doom Part 3 | | N/A |
The Watchdogs are part of the Decepticon security net on Cybertron under Shockwave. These hovercars patrol the roads of Cybertron, going where the traditional Decepticon jet cannot.
| Medicroids | None | Countdown to Extinction | | N/A |
The Medicroids are medical drones used by the Decepticons.
| Autobot X | None | Autobot Spike | | Don Messick and Corey Burton |
Autobot X is an Autobot drone created by Sparkplug Witwicky from spare parts. Spike Witwicky's mind is temporarily transferred into Autobot X to save his life after he is injured by Megatron.
| Nightbird | None | Enter the Nightbird | | N/A |
Nightbird is a human construct with a single form and thus not actually a Transformer herself. She is the first female robot to have appeared in the series. Created by Dr. Fujiyama, she was a mute non-transforming ninja robot drone. She was stolen by the Decepticons and reprogrammed to infiltrate the Ark and steal the World Energy Source from Teletraan I. She would subsequently be defeated and returned to her creator by the Autobots, and did not appear for the remainder of the animated series. In the series' tie-in comic, an army of Nightbird drones attack the Autobots, but are destroyed by Daniel Witwicky. The main Nightbird goes on to ally with the Decepticons.
| Sub-Atlanticans | None | Atlantis, Arise! | | Unknown |
Sub-Atlanticans are water-breathing humanoid fishmen who are different green colours. They are able to use telepathy to communicate with each other. They are evil and aggressive in nature and their leader is King Nergil.
| Nergil | None | Atlantis, Arise! | | Wally Burr |
King Nergil rules Sub-Atlantica, a hidden kingdom that is located underwater the sea. Their relationship to humanity proper is uncertain. Like most people Megatron makes deals with, he is devious and pretty much out for his own gain. He disappears after Sub-Atlantica is destroyed and sunk and it is unknown what became of him.
| The Alligaticon | None | City of Steel | | N/A |
The Alligaticon is a Reptilicon drone made by the Constructicons from the remains of the disassembled Optimus Prime. In the sewers, the drone encounters Ratchet, Hound, Mirage, and Bumblebee, who initially believe it to be a simple mindless beast. The Alligaticon is eventually subdued, allowing Optimus Prime to be reassembled.
| Medieval Solomon the owl | None | A Decepticon Raider in King Arthur's Court | | N/A |
Solomon is a male owl that hoots and is warmly greeted by elderly male wizard Beorht, who lived in 542, and then offers him some severed rat tails, which Solomon gladly eats.
| Medieval Cows | None | A Decepticon Raider in King Arthur's Court | | N/A |
There a few cows that are light brown that have not been dehorned that had wandered through a fence and eaten the plants in Aetheling the Red's garden, which caused his feuding with Sir Wigend du Blackthorne in 542.
| Medieval dragon | None | A Decepticon Raider in King Arthur's Court | | N/A |
In 542 there also lived a dragon in the Dragon Mound. When time-lost Transformers attempted to use the Mound to return to their proper time, they were confronted by the gigantic, fire-breathing beast, but Beorht and Warpath were able to scare it away with the explosive Dragon's Bane.
| The Golden Lagoon's wild animals | None | The Golden Lagoon | | N/A |
A group of very friendly wild animals residing in the hidden glen containing the Golden Lagoon, discovered by Beachcomber when he takes cover from a battle between the Autobots and the Decepticons in a cave that leads to the glen. A small green bird lands on his right shoulder, and he is surrounded by birds of different colours, rabbits, squirrels, deer, and racoons.
| Green anaconda | None | Microbots | | N/A |
While the Decepticons are in South America, a green anaconda falls from a tree to wrap around Starscream while Rumble and the Constructicons watch on and giggle with amusement.
| Wild zebras | None | Changing Gears | | N/A |
A pack of African wild zebras are shown galloping by, right before we see the Autobots drive by in the other direction to take on the Decepticons, who are draining energy from the sun.
| Titans | None | The God Gambit | | Unknown |
The Titans are a humanoid race of different colours with pointy ears who live on the moon of Titan, some of whom believe in sky gods. After Autobot Cosmos crashes on Titan, the belief is thought to have been confirmed to be true. They are forced to serve the Decepticons Astrotrain, Starscream, and Thrust who had arrived on Titan, but eventually befriend the Autobots Jazz, Perceptor, and Omega Supreme who later arrived on Titan as well. After fighting off the Decepticons, the Autobots help the Titans move to a different island to build a new home.
| Jero | None | The God Gambit | | Ed Gilbert |
Jero was the head astrologer priest on Titan, and as such forced all of the other Titans to worship their Sky God through offerings. One Titan, Talaria, attempted to revolt and expose Jero and the Sky Gods as fake, though Jero took advantage of Cosmos' crash landing to reclaim his position as a leader. It is not revealed whether Jero survived the temple explosion caused by the Decepticons.
| Talaria | None | The God Gambit | | Unknown |
Talaria is a member of the Titan species of the eponymous planet. During the annual sacrifice ceremony, she attempted to convince the other Titans that the Sky Gods and Jero were fake. However, this was interrupted by Cosmos' crash landing, which provided Jero with an opportunity to reclaim his authority. Talaria escapes, but is later captured and almost sacrificed before she is rescued by Jazz. Though Astrotrain's detonation of the energy crystals destroyed their island, Talaria survives and becomes the new leader of the Titans.
| Scrawney | None | The God Gambit | | Paul Eiding |
Scrawney is a Titan who believed Jero's proclamations of the existence of Sky Gods and even brought an offering to the temple, despite Talaria attempting to convince him that the Sky Gods were nonexistent. Scrawny and two other Titans later asked to be destroyed by the Autobots, as their faith had been destroyed. Scrawney survives the island explosion caused by the detonation of the energy crystals.
| Dinobot Island's dinosaurs | None | Dinobot Island Part 1 | Dinobot Island Part 2 | N/A |
Pre-historic dinosaurs that survived to the present day on a volcanic island, named Dinobot Island by Spike Witwicky after the Dinobots arrived there to start training to improve their skills. They are able to co-exist with the Dinobots, but start to give them trouble after the Decepticons arrive to collect the island's energy sources. Grimlock though is later to recruit the dinosaurs to his cause, as they battle and help defeat the Decepticons.
| Woolly mammoths | None | Dinobot Island Part 1 | Dinobot Island Part 2 | N/A |
Pre-historic woolly mammoths that come through a time warp, ridden by club-weilding barbarians, when Spike and Bumblebee are at a library. Huffer helps to temporarily put them in Optimus Prime's trailer before the Autobots are able to make them go back to their own time by driving them back through the time warp.
| The outlaws' horses | None | Dinobot Island Part 2 | | N/A |
Brown and white horses ridden by the outlaws who come through a time warp to take on bikers and then the Autobots. The outlaws and the horses are sent back to their own time after being forced to go back through the time warp.
| Robosmasher | None | The Secret of Omega Supreme | | N/A |
Robosmasher is a multi-armed robot created by Megatron back on Cybertron, which was used to seize Transformers and convert them to his cause. Robosmasher previously converted the Constructicons to the Decepticon cause.
| Robosmasher victim | Cybertronian vehicle | The Secret of Omega Supreme | | Michael McConnohie |
The robosmasher victim is a red, blue, and white Transformer known as a Gyronian Sentry from Gyronia. The hapless Gyronian Sentry was seized by robosmasher and was converted to serve Megatron.
| Robodoctor | None | The Secret of Omega Supreme | | Alan Oppenheimer |
The Robodoctor is an Autobot scientist who worked a lot on the creation of the Guardian Robots. Even though he is cheerful and friendly, he is somewhat overconfident as well, which may be a problem.
| Asteroid bird alien | None | The Secret of Omega Supreme | | N/A |
The asteroid bird alien is a creature capable of flying in outer space and firing energy blasts from its tail. It encounters the Constructicons after they are send to mine the asteroid it was living on and feeding from.
| Morphobots | None | Quest for survival | | N/A |
Morphobots are a species of mechanical plant that feed on mechanical life, primarily insectoids. They appear completely white with its structure divided into parts of five; namely, five roots, a five-toothed maw which opens when food arrives, and five tentacles with extendable claws.
| The Beast of Borneo | None | Prime Target | | N/A |
The Beast of Borneo is a dragon-like creature native to the island of Borneo captured by Lord Chumley. By 1985, Chumley used it in hunting other creatures.
| Lord Chumley's giant robot arachnids | None | Prime Target | | N/A |
Lord Chumley's giant robot arachnids are mechanical creatures used by Lord Chumley in his attempt to add the head of Optimus Prime to his hunting collection.
| Lord Chumley's giant pair of mechanical arms | None | Prime Target | | N/A |
A pair of giant mechanical arms that emerge from a billboard, controlled by Lord Chumley. The arms grab Blaster and forcibly trigger his transformation into his alternate mode, a boombox. This device demonstrates Chumley’s ability to manipulate Autobots using mechanical technology integrated into everyday objects.
| Aron | None | Child's Play | | Mona Marshall |
Aron is a young boy from the planet Brobdingnag who encounters both Autobots and Decepticons after the space bridge malfunctions during one of their battles. The Brobdingnagians and other natives of Brogdingnag are exponentially larger than an average Transformer, putting the Transformers at a relative size that makes them look like toys.
| Aron's parents | None | Child's Play | | Father - Walker Edmiston, Mother- Mona Marshall |
Aron's parents are two members of the Brobdingnag civilization. They are very protective of their son Aron. They acted very cautious when they saw the Autobots and Decepticons in Aron's room and called the authorities.
| Brobdingnagian scientist | None | Child's Play | | John Stephenson |
The Brobdingnagian scientist is an unnamed scientist who attempts to dissect the Transformers after they are found in Aron's room.
| Marty | None | Child's Play | | Mona Marshall |
Marty is a young boy who bullies Aron.
| Nitro | None | Child's Play | | Frank Welker |
Nitro is a six-limbed creature roughly analogous to a cat from the planet Brobdingnag, and is one of the three pets of Aron. Because everything on the planet is scaled up, Nitro is more than big enough to use Soundwave as a chew toy.
| Booper | None | Child's Play | | N/A |
Booper is an alien creature vaguely resembling a cross between an elephant and a mouse, and is one of Aron's pets.
| Brobdingnagian sewer creature | None | Child's Play | | N/A |
The Brobdingnagian sewer creature is a rat-like creature with an elephant-like trunk that is native to Brobdingnag.
| Aron's pet fish | None | Child's Play | | N/A |
Aron's pet fish is a piranha-esque creature from the planet Brobdingnag. The fish attacks Thrust after he is thrown into its aquarium by Nitro.
| Swamp alligators | None | Child's Play | | N/A |
Unusually large alligators that attack the Decepticons upon their return to earth from the alien planet Brobdingnag, immediately after Starscream says that he is glad that there "aren't any green monsters around".
| Bosch | None | The Gambler | | John Stephenson |
Bosch is an alien gambler who travels through the galaxy searching for ways to make a quick energon chip to feed his gambling habit. He will even go as far as to enslave unsuspecting travelers whom he picks up from space.
| Bosch's Robots | Unknown | The Gambler | | None |
Two identical multi-coloured robots who serve Bosch are seen aboard his spaceship after Smokescreen, who was among the Autobots Bosch had picked up, escapes imprisonment. One of them shoots Smokescreen in the back, which briefly freezes his movement.
| Lord Gyconi | None | The Gambler | | Walker Edmiston |
Lord Gyconi is a gangster and showman who runs rigged gladiator-type games in his Pit of Destruction under the employ of Megatron.
| Monacus casino worker | None | The Gambler | | N/A |
Monacus casino worker is a cloaked figure with a hood who stops Smokescreen from winning his last bet of energon chips.
| Animaliens | None | The Gambler | | N/A |
Animaliens are the star attraction in gladiatorial combat games on the casino asteroid Monacus.
| Robot Conversion Troops | Car Drones | Make Tracks | | None |
The Robot Conversion Troop are drones created from modified Earth cars who serve the Decepticons.
| Tlalakans | Mermaids and Mermen | Sea Change | | N/A |
Tlalakans are a white humanoid species with pointy ears, who live on the planet called Tlalakan, that may be somewhere not that far away from Earth. The Tlalakans have secret access to a pool of water that is known as the Well of Transformation, which can change them into any form they wish.
| Alana | Mermaid; Robot; Boat | Sea Change | | Melendy Britt |
Alana is a leader of the Tlalakan. She teamed up with the Autobots to defeat Deceptitran, a drone controlled by the Decepticons to keep her civilization enslaved. She used the Pool of Transformation to temporarily become a Transformer and fight alongside Seaspray, though she ultimately chose to remain in her original form. She and Seaspray nevertheless chopse to remain in a relationship.
| Chac | Merman | Sea Change | | Michael McConnohie |
Chac is a member of the Tlalakan species. While the species was enslaved, Chac was seized by drones and had his energy extracted from him, causing him to temporarily lose consciousness. With the help of the Autobots, Chac and the rest of the Tlalakans were able to defeat the Decepticons.
| Mok | Merman | Sea Change | | Paul Eiding |
Mok is a member of the Tlalakan species. Though Mok suggested the Tlalakans leave the Autobots to fight the drones on their own after the crash landing of the Cosmos, Alana convinced him that they should team up with the Autobots. Mok subsequently participated in the effort to rescue Bumblebee from the Decepticons and regain control of their civilization.
| Tlaloc | Merman | Sea Change | | Peter Cullen |
Tlaloc is an elder member of the Tlalakan species. He appears as a merman wielding a trident, causing him to resemble Neptune. Tlaloc welcomed Alana, Mok, and the Autobots to the Tlalakans' secret underwater city. He helped lead a successful effort to rescue Bumblebee from the Decepticons, though the underwater city was destroyed in the process.
| Rarto | Merman | Sea Change | | Unknown |
Rarto is a member of the Tlalakan species. Like most members of the species, he most frequently assumed the form of a merman. Rarto participated in the effort to rescue Bumblebee from the Decepticons by providing bombs to the Autobots.
| Deceptitran | None | Sea Change | | Paul Eiding |
Deceptitran is a Decepticon drone created to harvest energon on the planet Tlalakan. It is served by a group of smaller drones. Deceptitran was reprogrammed by Alana to obey her and send a fake distress call to Megatron.
| Centurion droids | None | The Key To Vector Sigma part 1 | Transformers: Headmasters | N/A |
The Centurion droids are an automated defense guarding the Vector Sigma supercomputer. Though possessing no weapons, Centurions are trained in hand-to-hand combat to stop all intruders.
| Maintenance drones | None | The Key To Vector Sigma part 1 | | N/A |
The Maintenance drones are a series of non-sentient bipedal mechanoids that were produced on Cybertron. They are not designed for combat and are thus easily destroyed.
| Giant Purple Griffin | None | Aerial Assault | | N/A |
The Giant Purple Griffin was one of Megatron's creations: a giant flying building shaped like a griffin. The Giant Purple Griffin had a mane of prehensile tentacles.
| Antillan Autobots | Unknown | Cosmic Rust | | Unknown |
The Antillan Autobots were an ancient colony of Autobots who resided on the planet Antilla. The entire civilization was killed by Cosmic Rust.
| Antillan holographic Autobot | Unknown | Cosmic Rust | | Unknown |
The Antillan holographic Autobot from the transmission was a deceased blue Autobot who in a poem warned the Decepticons about Cosmic Rust. He had Cosmic Rust on various parts of his body and a light brown pole in his left hand.
| Blast | Vertical Takeoff Jet Fighter | Starscream's Brigade | Fight or Flee | Unknown |
Blast is a Decepticon who participated in the fourth great war on Cybertron, which caused a number of Autobots to flee and form their own civilization on the planet Paradron.
| Guardian robots | Rocket/tank/Rocket base | War Dawn | Forever Is a Long Time Coming | Flaskback in Transformers: Animated |
The Guardian robots were once the peacekeepers of Cybertron, powerful giants who guarded cities and quelled uprisings. The Guardians gave the Decepticons much trouble at the outbreak of the Third Cybertronian War, but by the modern era they were no longer so prevalent. The most notable surviving Guardian is Omega Supreme.
| Autobot rebels | Unknown | Forever Is a Long Time Coming | | Unknown |
The Autobot rebels are members of the consumer product line that, done with their uncertain lives as slaves, rose up to fight their masters, the Quintessons. Known members include A-3, the leader, and Beta, the second-in-command.
| Inquirata | None | Forever Is a Long Time Coming | | Tony Pope |
Inquirata is a Quintesson scientist who was in charge of a project to use a Time Window to alter the outcome of the slave rebellion that took place on Cybertron eleven million years ago by abducting one of its leaders, A-3.
| Cybertronian hangar workers | Unknown | War Dawn | | N/A |
Cybertronian hangar workers are blue drone robots who are seen working in the hangar where Orion Pax and his comrades worked during the first golden age of Cybertron. After the hangar was attacked by Megatron and his troops and Orion Pax was injured after being blasted by Megatron, Orion Pax was taken to a repair shop by the Aerialbots, where inside more of the Cybertronian hangar drone workers were seen being repaired.
| Dropkick transport drones | Cybertronian flat bed trucks | War Dawn | | Keiichi Nanba |
Dropkick transport drones seemingly played a key role in the early days of the war launched by Megatron. Transforming from robots into Cybertronic flat bed trucks, they were used during energy raids both to transport warriors and to carry away the stolen fuel. Nine million years ago Megatron approached a dockside warehouse, workplace of a young Autobot named Orion Pax, along with a fleet of his transport drones. After initially claiming he was simply looking for a place to "store his wares," once told that the site only stored energy, he dropped this pretense, and at his signal both transport drones and warriors transformed. After personally blasting both Orion and his girlfriend Ariel, he ordered the warriors to terminate the warehouse's other workers.
| Dion | Cybertronian car | War Dawn | Flashback in Transformers: Animated | Corey Burton |
Dion was an earnest dock worker and best friend to Orion Pax. He was killed by Megatron during the attack that led to Orion Pax being rebuilt as Optimus Prime.
| Allicons | Crocodilian creatures | The Transformers: The Movie | The Quintesson Journal | Aron Kincaid |
The Allicons are a type of the Quintessons' enforcer-units, often used as guards for more important members of the race. They are slightly smarter than the Sharkticons, even capable of speech, but possess little free will.
| Headless Guardian robot | Rocket/tank/Rocket base | War Dawn | | N/A |
When Megatron and his Decepticons had gone back to Cybertron for a visit, as they were trying to reclaim the Kronosphere, they came across a de-activated headless Guardian robot, who was among a pile of refuse. They then re-activated and re-programmed it to serve their cause. Under the Decepticons' control, it then attacked Optimus Prime and his Autobots, who fought to fend it off. The Aerialbots soon arrive to aid the Autobots and combine to form Superion and defeat the Guardian robot.
| B.O.T. | None | B.O.T. | | N/A |
B.O.T. (Biotronic Operational Telecommunicator) is a robot built as an assignment for a pair of troublemaking sociopaths, who enlisted science girl Elise Presser to help out with the work. When Megatron decided to test his new cannon on the Ark, B.O.T. was sent to destroy it, while being remotely controlled by Elise. After making his way to the cannon, B.O.T. turns the cannon on its makers, destroying the cannon and himself in the process.
| Kremzeek | None | Kremzeek | | Wally Burr |
Kremzeek is an energy being created by Megatron. He is able to teleport via screens, disrupt circuitry, and duplicate himself if given enough energy.
| Kranix | Lithone vehicle | The Transformers: The Movie | | Norman Alden |
Kranix is the last survivor of the consumed planet Lithone. Well-versed in the art of combat, the friar warrior Kranix has an advanced artificial intelligence, possessing a full range of emotion. After surviving the destruction of his planet, he was eaten by Sharkticons.
| Arblus | Lithone vehicle | The Transformers: The Movie | | Norman Alden |
Arblus is a resident of the planet Lithone and a friend of Kranix. When Unicron approaches Lithone to devour it, he kills Arblus with corrosive mist.
| Lithone scientist | Lithone vehicle | The Transformers: The Movie | | N/A |
The Lithone scientist is an inhabitant of the planet Lithone and a skilled chemist. He was killed by Unicron.
| Lithones | Lithone vehicles | The Transformers: The Movie | | N/A |
The Lithones, sometimes known as Lithonians, are a robotic species from the planet Lithone. They possess a very high percentage of "emotional circuits" in their brains, which affects their individual personalities in different ways.
| Old Snake | None | Only Human | | Chris Latta |
Cobra Commander, a character originating from the G.I. Joe franchise, appears in the Transformers episode "Only Human". Formerly the leader of Cobra, he now operates as an underground weapons dealer.
| Chaos | Mineral monster | Chaos | | N/A |
Chaos is a monstrous alien native to the planet Dread. Its skin is composed of a destructive mineral known as death crystal.
| Shrikebats | Bat Monster | The Transformers: The Movie | Chaos | N/A |
Shrikebats are vicious bat-like aliens found on Dromedon and Dread. A group of them is referred to as a "wreck".
| Ick-Yak | None | Chaos | N/A | |
Ick-Yak is a reptilian creature who Kup has encountered numerous times.
| Orbs | None | Chaos | N/A | |
Orbs are alien slavers who capture robots to use as labour. Their primary interest is mining death crystals on planet Dread.
| Dread slaves | Unknown | Chaos | | Frank Welker, Gregg Berger, and Casey Kasem |
The Dread slaves are an alien robot race who were imprisoned 100,000 years ago along with Kup on the Planet Dread. Though Kup had managed to escape the Dread prison, the Dread slaves had not. After being greatly disturbed by the memory of this, he returned alongside his fellow Autobots to the planet Dread and fought the evil monster Chaos and freed the slaves, who were still being held captive there.
| Paradron Autobots | Unknown | Fight or Flee | | Sandstorm: Jerry Houser |
The Paradron Autobots are a pacifist race of Autobots native to the planet Paradron. These Autobots left Cybertron during the fourth great war to escape the violence. Decepticons crash landed on the planet and were nursed back to health by the inhabitants. One native, Sandstorm, unsuccessfully attempted to warn the other inhabitants about the Decepticons. Sandstorm was later imprisoned and the other Paradron Autobots were enslaved after the Decepticons declared the planet part of their empire. The non-pacifist Autobots arrive and convince Sandstorm and the other Paradron Autobots to fight the Decepticons and destroy the energon core, causing their planet to explode. The Paradron Autobots escape and return to Cybertron.
| Paradron Medics | Cybertronian Convertible and Unknown | Fight or Flee | | Unknown |
The Paradron Medics are a pair of Autobots who nurse Cyclonus and Scourge back to health after they crash-land on Paradron.
| Playback | Unknown | Fight or Flee | | Laurie Faso |
Playback is a pacifist Autobot living on Paradron. He is in charge of the planet's communication tower.
| Paradron Autobot workers | Unknown | Fight or Flee | | Unknown |
The Paradron Autobot workers are white and yellow robots with Autobot symbols who worked for the Paradron Autobots on the planet Paradron. The Decepticons prepared to attack these robots, though decided against it upon realizing they had no intention of fighting back. The Paradron Autobot workers were later freed by the Autobots, who convinced the robots to fight for their planet back rather than remain peaceful.
| Alien space station diner's creatures | None | Starscream's Ghost | | Unknown |
When Sandstorm and Octane went to an alien space station diner, during the time Octane was on the run from Galvatron, they encountered alien humanoid creatures of many different colours, including a female one who served them. Among the alien creatures was a squid-like creature who ate the gun of Skuxxoid, who was following Sandstorm and Octane at Galvatron's orders.
| Primacron | N/A | Call of the Primitives | | Hal Rayle |
Primacron is an ancient alien scientist who created Unicron.
| Oracle | N/A | Call of the Primitives | | Gregg Berger |
The Oracle was once the assistant of Primacron, an ageless creature of magnificent intellect. Primacron built the Oracle to help him create life, but the Oracle's corporeal existence was cut short after the birth of Unicron.
| Lipoles | Shark monsters | Five Faces of Darkness (Part 3) | Five Faces of Darkness (Part 5) | N/A |
Lipoles are bat-like creatures native to Io. They possess acidic saliva and primarily eat metal. When threatened, they can transform into explosive missiles.
| The prophetic dead Decepticon | Unknown | Starscream's Ghost | | N/A |
The prophetic dead Decepticon is a Decepticon honored by a statue in the Decepticon Crypt. When Octane came across the Decepticon Crypt, he noted that the marker of this Decepticon stated that "Death comes to anyone who hides behind my marker".
| Quintesson Guard | Crocodilian creature | The Killing Jar | | Aron Kincaid |
A single Allicon later served as the guard for a Quintesson scientist who kidnapped Ultra Magnus, Cyclonus, Marissa Faireborn, and Wreck-Gar in an attempt to find weaknesses in each prisoner's group. The ship got caught in an electron storm, and the Allicon steered the ship in the wrong direction attempting to pull free, which earned a slap from the scientist before it corrected and changed course. When the captives escaped, it dueled Wreck-Gar with a spear until the Quintesson's ship started being dragged into a black hole. The Allicon set the ship in reverse thrust to try and resist the gravity well, and activated a distress beacon in hopes that a passing ship might rescue them before the ship's thrusters lost power. When the Quintesson tried to flee in the only escape pod, the Allicon alerted them to the attempt and ran to the escape pod as well, but then froze up when the scientist ordered it to stop. That lockup cleared up as soon as Marissa ran for the pod, and the guard pulled her from Magnus' hands, which resulted in the pod launching with no-one inside. When the ship eventually fell into the black hole, they found themselves in a "negative universe", and the Allicon donated some of its parts to repair the engines and rocket back to their home universe through the "white hole". Finding themselves in the middle of a stalemated skirmish between their various factions who had come to rescue them, the group agreed to simply part ways without further fighting, and the Allicon and its master went off on their own.
| Flint | None | The Killing Jar | | Bill Ratner |
Flint, a character originating from the G.I. Joe franchise, appears in the episode "The Killing Jar". A Quintesson uses a hologram of Flint to trick his daughter Marissa, intending to examine and eventually dissect her. When Marissa realizes that the hologram is not real, she attacks and dissipates it.
| Fake Galvatron | Laser Cannon | The Killing Jar | | Unknown |
The fake Galvatron is an elaborate hologram used by a Quintesson which attacked Cyclonus, who was tricked into boarding the Quintesson's ship. Cyclonus was able to restrain the fake Galvatron, after which it disappeared, leaving Cyclonus confused as to why Galvatron would attack his most loyal soldier.
| Fake Rodimus Prime | Futuristic Sports Truck | The Killing Jar | | Dick Gautier |
After Ultra Magnus boarded a fake Sky Lynx, which told him that Rodimus Prime wanted to see him, he was then attacked by a fake Rodimus Prime, which was an elaborate hologram created by a Quintesson. Ultra Magnus was able to take control of the fake Rodimus Prime, which then disappeared.
| Fake Sky Lynx | Quintession Ship | The Killing Jar | | Aron Kincaid |
The fake Sky Lynx which Ultra Magnus boarded was really a Quintession Ship disguised using a hologram. As Ultra Magnus did not recognize its inside he asked "Hey Sky Lynx, who is your new interior decorator?"
| Torkuli | None | Webworld | | Paul Eiding (Head Torkuli), Stan Jones, and Victor Caroli |
The ape-like Torkuli are the dominant species of the planet Torkulon. They are renowned throughout the galaxy as experts in psychiatric therapy; they have devoted their entire culture and all known activities on their world to the treatment and care of damaged or deranged minds, treating a variety of creatures.
| Alya | None | Webworld | | N/A |
The Alya are an insect-like species with large claws that can spin 360 degrees, akin to a drill. The Alya are capable of understanding spoken language and possess limited telepathic abilities.
| Bouncing alien | None | Webworld | | N/A |
The Bouncing alien is three eyed alien with horns and no legs who Galvatron encounters in an arena on Torkulun. This was a kind of treatment for Galavtron. While it bounces it screams which drives Galvatron crazy. He then lashes out at it, but is restrained before he can harm it.
| Skuxxoid | Stone, Reptilian humanoid monsters | Five Faces of Darkness (Part 1) | Grimlock's New Brain | Corey Burton |
The Skuxxoids are an intelligent humanoid reptilian species who often sell their services to the highest bidder as mercenaries for credits.
| Xetaxxians | Unknown | The Quintesson Journal | | Unknown |
The Xetaxxians are a mechanical species from the planet Xetaxxis. The Xetaxxians were at war with the Lanarqans, a fellow mechanical species, for centuries, with both sides relying on the Quintessons for weapons. The two species agree to end the war after learning that the Quintessons had intentionally kept the war going to profit themselves.
| Custodiobot | Unknown | Surprise Party | | Corey Burton |
Custodiobot is an Autobot who was put in charge of the Hall of Records on Cybertron.
| Sentry drones | None | Surprise Party | | Unknown |
The Sentry drones are three robots who travel on wheels who say "Greetings" and chase and shoot at Wheelie and Daniel while they repeatedly ask them for file names. The Decepticons then show up and destroy the Sentry drones.
| Scaly flying eels | None | Surprise Party | | N/A |
While Wheelie and Daniel were traveling to learn Ultra Magnus' creation date, they were attacked by many scaly flying eels that also destroyed the ship that they arrived in and later attacked Ultra Magnus and Sky Lynx. The eels were defeated each time.
| Allegra | None | Carnage in C-Minor | | Unknown |
Allegra originates from the musically based planet of Eurythma and possesses one third of a harmony with tremendous destructive power. She has an acrimonious relationship with Basso Profundo, who possess one of the other thirds and is leader of their planet.
| Zebop Skandana | None | Carnage in C-Minor | | Paul Eiding |
Along with Allegra and Basso Profundo, Zebop Skandana holds one third of the weaponized harmony used to defend their planet, Eurythma, a world whose culture is based entirely on music. He seems to have forged a deep emotional connection with Allegra, but does not share her enmity for Basso Profundo.
| Basso Profundo | None | Carnage in C-Minor | | Ed Gilbert |
Basso Profundo is the leader of Eurythma and, along with Allegra and Zebop Skandana, provides a third of the harmony used in the harmonic weapon that protects Eurythma. Basso has a hostile relationship with Allegra, and dislikes her style of music.
| Eurythman communicator | None | Carnage in C-Minor | | Paul Eiding |
The Eurythman communicator is an Eurythman public servant. She has a professional mindset with a streak of cynicism. She had asked Basso what he was going to do about the giant robots fighting close to the city. Basso answered he'd use his part of the harmony in combination with the harmonic amplifier to get rid of them, tried to do just that and failed. Everything but surprised, the communicator pointed out he needed the aid of Allegra and Zebop Skandana for the harmony to be effective.
| NUL-A | None | The Ultimate Weapon | | Charlie Adler |
NUL-A is a giant robot who runs a junkyard. He is a large fan of baseball.
| Ynara | None | Madman's Paradise | | Unknown |
Ynara is an ambassador from Odessix to Cybertron. She has a refined, upper-class manner. She is also easily embarrassed, which causes her to turn completely bright red.
| The Golden One | Dragon | Madman's Paradise | | Gregg Berger |
The Golden One is a powerful sorcerer who rules the magical world of Menonia in another dimension. His magic is powered by solar energy and allows him to transform into a dragon and create portals.
| The Golden One's pupil | None | Madman's Paradise | | Paul Eiding |
The Golden One's pupil is a resident of Menonia and the favourite student of the Golden One. Despite being the student of a sorcerer, the pupil is not seen to use magic at all.
| Mara-Al-Utha/The Red Wizard | None | Madman's Paradise | | Corey Burton |
Mara-Al-Utha, also known as the Red Wizard, is a bombastic Quintesson sorcerer. Banished long ago by his fellows, Mara-Al-Utha has taken on the identity of the Red Wizard, attempting to take control of Menonia. He is aided by an army of robots constructed from wood and his faithful pet Groyle.
| Groyle | None | Madman's Paradise | | N/A |
Groyle is a winged creature native to the world of Menonia, and the "sweet pet" of Mara-Al-Utha.
| Tree-centaurs | centaurs | Madman's Paradise | | Unknown |
These living trees known as Tree-centaurs are trees with the ability to come to life and take on a cyclops centaur form. They do so when Grimlock and Daniel Witwicky arrive in Menonia and attack them by throwing their weapons at them. They are stopped by a spell cast by The Red Wizard and revert to tree form.
| Wood-bots | None | Madman's Paradise | | N/A |
Wood-bots are Transformer-shaped wooden servants of the Red Wizard. When Daniel Witwicky fell asleep, the Wood-bots carried him off to bed at their master's request.
| Menonian alien whipping creature | None | Madman's Paradise | | N/A |
The Menonian alien whipping creature is a servant of Mara-Al-Utha. It has four arms, which is uses to whip Menonians and keep them in line.
| Bird-people | None | Madman's Paradise | | N/A |
Bird-people are humanoid creatures with wings who can fly and are servants of the Red Wizard. They attacked Grimlock and the Autobots at their master's orders.
| Trans-Organics | None | The Dweller in the Depths | | Unknown |
The Trans-Organics are the first creations of the Quintessons, predating even the Transformers. They consist of a gorilla-like beast with green tendrils for arms, a white snake, a bird, an anklyosaur-like creature, a half-robotic bear, a frog-like creature with a camera for an eye, and an energy-draining worm-like creature known as the Dweller. The Dweller consumes the other Trans-Organics before attacking the Transformers, who send it into space.
| Fairy-tale princess | None | Nightmare planet | | Linda Gary |
The fairy-tale princess is a figment of Daniel Witwicky's imagination created when the Quintessons were messing with the boy's head. She actively helps Daniel wake up, even though this would mean ending her existence.
| Dream Witch | None | Nightmare planet | | Unknown |
The Dream Witch is a witch who attacks Rodimus Prime, Ultra Magnus, and the Predacons in the nightmare world. Magnus destroys the witch with a bucket of water.
| Dream Giant | None | Nightmare Planet | | Unknown |
The Dream Giant is a giant who appeared in one of Daniel's nightmares. The giant captures Rodimus Prime and Ultra Magnus, but is accidentally turned into a toad by the Dream Witch.
| Dream Monsters | None | Nightmare Planet | | Unknown |
A number of giant monsters briefly appeared in one of Daniel's nightmares, including a vampire, a werewolf, a gargoyle, Frankenstein's monster, and a skeleton in a white robe.
| Giant Galvatron | Laser Cannon | Nightmare Planet | | Frank Welker |
Giant Galvatron is a gargantuan version of Galvatron who appeared in a recurring dream of Daniel's. In one of these nightmares, Daniel was chased and almost crushed by Galvatron before waking up startled. When Daniel told Rodimus Prime about this dream, the latter recommended Daniel dream of a giant version of Rodimus to fight off Galvatron. Giant Galvatron attacked Rodimus Prime and Headstrong in a subsequent dream, though was defeated himself by Giant Rodimus Prime.
| Giant Rodimus Prime | Futuristic Sports truck | Nightmare Planet | | Dick Gautier |
Giant Rodimus Prime is a massive version of Rodimus Prime who appeared in one of Daniel's nightmares. In that dream, Rodimus Prime and Headstrong were attacked by a giant version of Galvatron, who was challenged to "pick on someone [his] own size" by Giant Rodimus Prime. Giant Rodimus Prime proceeded to defeat Giant Galvatron by throwing him into the sky.
| Giant Pink Dragon | None | Nightmare Planet | | N/A |
The Giant Pink Dragon is a dragon that appeared in one of Daniel's nightmares. The dragon captured Springer and Razorclaw and took them to a castle, where they met a princess who informed them that they could kill the dragon with a magic lance. The princess also stated that the two would receive gold from her father if they helped free her. The duo later encountered the dragon again in the castle, and Razorclaw reluctantly helped Springer defeat it.
| Zamojins | None | The Face of Nijika | | Unknown |
The Zamojins are a white humanoid race who live on the planet Zamojin. They are light skinned, have dark hair, pointy ears and appear to be very aggressive in nature.
| Nijika the Sky-Dancer | None | The Face of Nijika | | Mona Marshall |
Nijika is a feminine android who encounters the Autobots and the Quintessons in the Quadrant Lock. Since Nijika's face was damaged, Katsu Don, who owned Nijika, forcefully removed Perceptor's insignia and added it to Nijika's face, which restored her appearance. Perceptor was later able to reclaim his insignia from Nijika.
| Katsu Don | None | The Face of Nijika | | Jack Angel |
Katsu Don is a blacksmith from the planet Zamojin. He lives close the city of Tozin in a hut and is hoping to complete his ancestor's work.
| Bruta Lo | None | The Face of Nijika | | Frank Welker |
Bruta Lo is Katsu Don's pet. It is quadrupedal and has a mix of mammalian and reptilian traits.
| Niko Don | None | The Face of Nijika | | Frank Welker |
Niko Don is a native of the planet Zamojin. He is the creator of Nijika and an ancient ancestor of Katsu Don.
| Old Zamojin Empress | None | The Face of Nijika | | Mona Marshall |
The Old Zamojin Empress ruled Zamojin 5,000 years ago, during a time period known as the "Night of the Devils".
| The New Zamojin Empress | None | The Face of Nijika | | Denise Mora |
The New Zamojin Empress is the ruler of Zamojin in 2006.
| Cat-like aliens | None | The Big Broadcast of 2006 | | Unknown |
The cat-like aliens are anthropomorphic cat-like aliens from the planet Delta Pavonis IV. In 2006, the aliens are incited by the Quintessons' hostile subliminal messages to attack their dog-like neighbors.
| Autobot Mausoleum deceased Autobot | Unknown | Dark Awakening | | N/A |
During the time that the Autobots board the Autobot Mausoleum and Daniel Witwicky encounter Zombie Optimus Prime, he then ran away scared and ran into one of doors that was holding a deceased Autobot, which then fell out onto the ground. Nothing at all is known about this Autobot.
| Optimus Prime's Mausoleum deceased Autobot's spaceship parts | Unknown | Dark Awakening | | N/A |
The Zombie Optimus Prime built himself a spaceship out of deceased Autobot parts that he is shown carrying, so could leave the Mausoleum. Nothing at all is known about these Autobots.
| Brown laboratory rats | None | The Return of Optimus Prime, Part 1 | | N/A |
The brown laboratory rats are two rats in a glass cage in the science laboratory of Dr. Mark and Jessica Morgan and Gregory Swafford. After Swafford infects one of the rats with the hate-plague, it then attacks the other rat. While the rats fight a button is pushed, that makes a glass wall come up in the middle of the cage that separates the rats, thus stopping their fighting.
| Giant spider | None | The Return of Optimus Prime, Part 2 | | N/A |
While the Autobots are on Charr being led by Optimus Prime, they encounter a giant spider while crossing its web. It tries to eat Goldbug, but the Autobots stop it by blasting at it and making it fall many feet below.
| Energon leeches | None | The Return of Optimus Prime, Part 2 | | N/A |
After dealing with the Giant Spider on Charr the Autobots encounter Energon leeches that fall on them. When Optimus Prime cries out to Galvatron for help, Galavtron reluctantly shoots them off Prime and the Autobots.
| Unknown Ancient Autobot Leader | Unknown | The Return of Optimus Prime, Part 2 | | N/A |
After Optimus Prime travels into the Autobot Matrix of Leadership and encounters Alpha Trion to ask about finding a cure for the hate-plague, another ancient Autobot leader is seen right after him for a few seconds who has the same colour patterns as Trion. Nothing at all is known about him or about the conversation that he had with Prime.
| It | None | The Return of Optimus Prime, Part 2 | | Peter Cullen |
It is an entity who resides in the Autobot Matrix of Leadership.

== City-bots components ==
The following are components of Metroplex, Trypticon, Scorponok, and Fortress Maximus:

| Name | Alternate mode | First and Last appearances | | Voiced by |
|---|---|---|---|---|
| Scamper | Cybertronic six-wheels car | Five Faces of Darkness (Part 5) | The Ultimate Weapon | Dan Gilvezan |
Scamper is an extension of Metroplex, a giant Autobot who makes up a city. He commonly patrols the peripheries of Metroplex in his sports car mode alongside Slammer.
| Six-Gun | Metroplex Tower (Did not transform in cartoon) | Thief in the Night | | Maurice LaMarche |
Six-Gun is an autonomous extension of Metroplex who helps patrol and defend Metroplex's interior and periphery. He wields several guns and, like his partners, is mentally linked to Metroplex.
| Slammer | Nothing but only a Cybertronic tank in robot mode | Thief in the Night | The Ultimate Weapon | Chris Latta |
Slammer is a drone controlled by Metroplex.
| Full-Tilt | Cybertronic race car | Call of the Primitives | | N/A |
Full-Tilt is a Decepticon drone.
| Brunt | Cybertronic tank | Marvel Comics | | No Voice |
Brunt is a tank that splits into several towers of Trypticon's city mode. In battle station mode, Trypticon uses Brunt's turret as his main cannon.
| Wipe-Out | Cybertronic car | Marvel Comics | | No Voice |
Wipe-Out is a Decepticon who is loyal to Trypticon.
| Cerebros | Miniature Fortress Maximus/Head | The Rebirth (Part 1) | The Rebirth (Part 3) | Jered Barclay |
Cerebros is a robot who transforms into Fortress Maximus' head. It is binary bonded to Spike Witwicky.
| Lord Zarak | Head | The Rebirth (Part 2,3) | | Stan Jones |
Lord Zarak is a Nebulan leader who makes up Scorponok's head.

== Mini-Cassettes ==
Cassette warriors are small Transformers, no taller than humans. All Mini-Cassettes have a microcassette as their alt mode, allowing them to record information and making them highly skilled in espionage. Some of the Mini-Cassettes have a mechanical animal-like form as their secondary alt mode.

=== Autobot Mini-Cassettes ===
| Name | Alternate mode | First and Last appearances | | Voiced by | Status |
|---|---|---|---|---|---|
| Eject | Cassette tape | The Transformers: The Movie | Madman's Paradise | N/A | Alive |
Eject is a Mini-Cassette who tends to use sports-related terms and metaphors in conversation. In cassette mode, he can monitor and record radio and television signals, decode scrambled signals, and tap telephones. In robot mode, he uses electrical overload guns.
| Rewind | Cassette tape | The Transformers: The Movie | Madman's Paradise | Townsend Coleman | Alive |
Rewind is a Mini-Cassette with a large memory bank that allows him to store vast amounts of information, though most of it is trivial and useless. Rewind can release blinding bursts of energy from his data storage and wields rifles that shoot unbreakable metal-bonding glue.
| Ramhorn | Rhinoceros/Cassette tape | Scramble City | Call of the Primitives | John Hostetter | Alive |
Ramhorn is a Mini-Cassette who is territorial and has a short temper. He wields laser-guided, heat-seeking missiles that can lock in and hit a target up to twelve miles away. As a cassette, he can vibrate and destroy any equipment into which he is inserted. Ramhorn can also transform into a rhinoceros with a powerful charge.
| Steeljaw | Lion/Cassette tape | Scramble City | The Return of Optimus Prime (Part 2) | Frank Welker | Alive |
Steeljaw is a Mini-Cassette who is determined, tenacious, and coolly professional in missions. He wields two solar-powered pellet guns that fire 1,200 rounds per minute. Steeljaw's alt mode is a lion, who possesses powerful jaws.

=== Decepticon Mini-Cassettes ===
| Name | Alternate mode | First and Last appearances | | Voiced by | Status |
|---|---|---|---|---|---|
| Laserbeak | Condor/Cassette tape | More Than Meets the Eye (Part 1) | Web World | Chris Latta (animal noises only) | Alive |
Laserbeak is a Mini-Cassette who is cunning, cautious, and takes great pleasure in hunting down targets usually the straggling survivors of a battle. He wields two laser cannons that are powered by rubies and can fire with high precision. Laserbeak's alt mode is a condor; in this form, he can fly up to 250 mph.
| Rumble | Cassette tape | More Than Meets the Eye (Part 1) | Five Faces of Darkness (Part 3) | Frank Welker | Alive |
Rumble is a small, but tough Mini-Cassette with a short temper who eagerly follows Megatron's orders. He can generate low-frequency groundwaves to create powerful earthquakes.
| Ravage | Black panther/Cassette tape | More Than Meets the Eye (Part 1) | Call of the Primitives | Frank Welker | Alive |
Ravage is a solitary Mini-Cassette who is adept at devising new strategies. He wields heat-seeking missiles and can camouflage in light or shadow.
| Frenzy | Cassette tape | Countdown to Extinction | The Transformers: The Movie | Frank Welker | Alive |
Frenzy is a Mini-Cassette who enjoys spreading fear and destruction. His devotion to warfare makes him hard to deal with on a personal level. Frenzy can roll his drums to produce a high-pitch, grating sound of 200db.
| Buzzsaw | Condor/Cassette tape | Atlantis, Arise! | Auto Berserk | Chris Latta | Alive |
Buzzsaw is a Mini-Cassette who is sophisticated, yet cruel and approaches tasks from an artistic perspective. He wields twin mortar cannons. Buzzsaw's alt mode is a condor; in this form, he can fly up to 250 mph and possesses a durable, serrated beak.
| Ratbat | Bat/Cassette tape | Scramble City | The Return of Optimus Prime (Part 1) | Frank Welker | Alive |
Ratbat is a solitary Mini-Cassette who has no friends and is generally loyal only to himself. He wields electron lasers and sensors that can detect fuel and very small objects. Ratbat's alt mode is a bat; in this form, he can refuel himself by absorbing fuel through his fangs.
| Autoscout | Scout vehicle/Cassette tape | A Prime Problem | | None | Dead |
Autoscout is an unnamed Autoscout drone who appears in the episode "A Prime Problem". It is tasked with observing a crevice full of radioactive korlonium crystals. Despite Megatron's orders, Autoscout picks up one of the crystals, which explodes and kills it.
| Slugfest | Stegosaurus/Cassette tape | Call of the Primitives | | Frank Welker | Alive |
Slugfest is a Mini-Cassette who has a short temper, entering violent states of rage whenever he thinks someone is talking about him. He wields two solar-powered cannons. Slugfest's alt mode is a Stegosaurus, who possesses powerful teeth that can cut through most substances.
| Overkill | Ceratosaurus/Cassette tape | Call of the Primitives | | Frank Welker | Alive |
Overkill is a Mini-Cassette who is violent and does everything in excess, trying to prove how tough he is. He wields motion-seeking missiles, which react to movement and explode on contact. Overkill's alt mode is a Ceratosaurus; in this form, he can easily rip open large vehicles such as cars and ships.

== Sources ==
- Text was copied from Transformers Wiki, which is released under a Creative Commons Attribution-Share Alike 3.0 (Unported) (CC-BY-SA 3.0) license.
