= Transformers: War for Cybertron (Nintendo DS video game) =

2010 video game

- North American Decepticon box art
- Developer(s): Vicarious Visions
- Publisher(s): Activision
- Platform(s): Nintendo DS
- Release: NA: June 22, 2010; PAL: June 25, 2010
- Genre(s): Third-person shooter
- Mode(s): Single-player, multiplayer

Transformers: War for Cybertron - Autobots and Transformers: War for Cybertron - Decepticons are two action-adventure video games based on the Transformers franchise, published by Activision in June 2010. A port of High Moon Studios' Transformers: War for Cybertron for the Nintendo DS, they were developed by Vicarious Visions, who also worked on Transformers Autobots and Transformers Decepticons in 2007, and Transformers Revenge of the Fallen: Autobots and Transformers Revenge of the Fallen: Decepticons in 2009. Although they share some basic similarities, the two games follow different storylines (one from the Autobots' perspective, and the other from the Decepticons' perspective), and feature different characters, missions, and locations.

== Gameplay ==
Like the console version, the central focus of the two DS games is a linear campaign of missions, following basically the same story, split in two parts. Additionally, there is an Arena mode with five "arenas", each with six missions available, four bonus levels from the opposing game, and seven multiplayer levels.

Before each mission, you pick two Transformers from your available troops. During the mission, you switch between the two chosen characters using the A button. If a character is knocked out, they can be revived by defeating a certain number of enemies with the remaining character. New characters can be unlocked by completing campaign and arena missions, locating "data disks" which appear as floating golden discs, or using unlock codes. There are 24 unlockable characters in total, 14 through the campaign and 10 in the arenas. Other data disks can be selected at the start of a mission to boost character stats.

Characters are classed as "Heavy", "Light" or "Air". While "Air" has the obvious advantage of flight, missions contain areas which only certain classes can go: marked walls can be bashed down by heavy vehicles, and there are small spaces where only light vehicles can go. There are also three weapon types: "plasma" represented by a red circle, "laser" represented by a yellow triangle, and "solid" represented by a blue square. Each character has a ranged weapon (typically plasma or laser) and a melee weapon (typically solid). Enemies are particularly vulnerable to a certain type of damage, which is visible as the symbol representing that damage type above the enemy's head. Advanced enemies can change which damage type they're vulnerable to.

While the foes have health bars that appear over their heads, the player has three bars on their HUD — a health bar, an energy bar, which represents energy they can use to fire, and a boost bar which appears while in vehicle mode, which they can use to boost their speed. All three bars will regenerate in time, though for "Air" characters, the energy bar will not regenerate while they're in vehicle mode.

The game also incorporates a leveling system. Characters begin at level 1 and gain experience by killing enemies and finding Energon cubes. Each level gives the character a stat point which can them be spent on one of three stats to increase the character's power. Some stats, when upgraded to a certain level, bestow on the character extra powers, such as new attacks, more powerful weapons, and sundry other abilities. The maximum level possible is 20, giving 19 stat points.

Multiplayer is achieved by using the DS Wi-Fi. Available game types for multiplayer are Deathmatch, King of the Hill, Capture the Flag, and Energon Dash. Additionally, you can play "Ante Games", in which each player bets one of their characters on the outcome. The winner gains the loser's ante character, but the loser can unlock their character again by playing a "rescue" mission, assaulting a prison to free the lost character. Data disks which are exclusive to certain levels available only in the opposite version can be obtained only by playing in multiplayer.

== Synopsis ==
=== Setting ===
War for Cybertron is set on the planet Cybertron, prior to the Transformers' contact with the planet Earth. Robotic in nature, each Transformer has the ability to transform from their robot mode to an alternate form, usually a vehicle, such as a tank or jet. The Transformers are engaged in total civil war with one another, with two factions emerging: the Decepticons, a splinter group led by the powerful and ruthless Megatron, who seeks to conquer Cybertron to force a regime change, perceiving the current leadership as weak and corrupt; and the Autobots, who follow the command of Zeta Prime and seek to put an end to Megatron's revolution and restore peace and order to Cybertron. However, after Zeta Prime is killed in battle, an inexperienced leader named Optimus must take his place and lead the Autobots to victory before Megatron can corrupt the planet, itself a Transformer, with Dark Energon.

Each of the two games has its own campaign, one focused on the Autobots, and the other on the Decepticons. Like the other versions of War for Cybertron, the Decepticon campaign is chronologically first, with the Autobot story directly following it.

=== Characters ===
Autobots
Optimus Prime; Bumblebee; Ironhide^{a}; Ratchet^{a}; Cliffjumper^{a}	Sideswipe^{a}; Swoop^{a}; Silverbolt^{d}; Warpath^{a}; Jetfire^{a}	Jazz^{b}; Ultra Magnus^{b}; Air Raid^{b}; Rodimus; Grimlock^{b}	Hot Rod^{b}; Autobot rookie; Kup^{c}; Zeta Prime^{c}; Omega Supreme^{c}
Decepticons
Megatron; Brawl; Starscream^{a}; Skywarp^{a}; Thundercracker^{a}	Onslaught^{a}; Ramjet^{d}; Dragstrip^{a}; Dirge^{a}	Soundwave^{a}; Barricade^{b}; Motormaster^{b}; Cyclonus^{b}	Breakdown^{b}; Shockwave^{b}; Laserbeak^{c}; Trypticon^{c}

^a Unlockable through the campaign
^b Unlockable in the arenas
^c Not a playable character
^d Unlockable only with a code

=== Plot ===
==== Decepticon campaign ====
When Megatron attacks an Autobot training facility in search for something, Ironhide and Ratchet send an Autobot rookie to investigate. After undergoing some basic training under Air Raid's guidance, the rookie is forced to help fend off the Decepticon attack. With Dirge and Brawl's aid, Megatron creates a distraction to allow Soundwave to hack into the Autobots' mainframe and retrieve data on the location of the Trypticon Space Station, before making his escape, defeating Jetfire in the process. Megatron and a Decepticon team, including Barricade, subsequently attack the station, which is rumored to hold the legendary Dark Energon, and is commanded by Starscream. The Decepticons fight their way through Starscream's men, ultimately defeating him and reaching the laboratory with the Dark Energon, restarting its production. After Starscream begs for mercy, Megatron allows him to join the Decepticons, before moving the Dark Energon to a more secure location: the Decepticon capital city of Kaon.

A few Decepticons are selected to test the Dark Energon's powers, and go through a fighting course in Kaon, under Barricade's coordination. After battling numerous Autobot prisoners set loose, including Ironhide, the test is complete, though it cost the Decepticons most of their Dark Energon supply, so Megatron orders Starscream to find a way to produce more. Upon learning of an ancient Space Bridge used to transport Energon from Cybertron to the Trypticon Station, Starscream and several other Decepticons travel there and fight their way past the guards and defense system to reach the Space Bridge's core. After restoring power to it, the Decepticons are attacked by an Autobot team led by Silverbolt, forcing them to reroute the power using a back-up link. Upon defeating the Autobots, they reroute the power, only to discover the Autobots severed the link to Cybertron's core using Omega Key-encrypted locks, preventing the Decepticons from successfully reaching fullest power. On Megatron's orders, Soundwave assembles a strike team to find said key.

After Laserbeak intercepts a transmission that reveals the key to be in the possession of Autobot leader Zeta Prime, the strike team attacks the Autobot capital city of Iacon to retrieve it. The team soon retrieve some encrypted data, which Starsream decodes, learning that Zeta Prime and the Omega Key are in the heart of Iacon. Megatron personally leads the assault, ultimately finding the key, though they are attacked by Zeta before they can claim it. After defeating him, the Decepticons take him prisoner and retrieve the Omega Key, though Zeta then reveals to Megatron that what he was guarding isn't the key, but rather a device that summons the real key: the Autobot-allegianced giant called Omega Supreme.

As Starsream restarts the link between Cybertron's core and the Trypticon Station, the Decepticons in Iacon make their retreat, fighting off any Autobots in their path, including Cliffjumper and Jetfire. Afterwards, they are attacked by Omega Supreme, and Megatron motivates his followers into fighting and ultimately defeating him. With Omega Supreme defeated, the Decepticons gain access to Cybertron's core, itself a Transformer, and successfully infect with Dark Energon, leaving Megatron to proudly proclaim that the planet is his and the Autobots are finished.

==== Autobot campaign ====
Leader Zeta Prime makes a distress call to his fellow Autobots, in particular Optimus, but is cut off before he can reveal his location. Ironhide sends Bumblebee to find Optimus, and an Autobot rookie to assist Ratchet and Air Raid. After undergoing some basic training, the rookie is forced to help fend off a Decepticon attack, led by Starscream, who almost kills the rookie, before Optimus arrives and chases him away. With Jetfire and Bumblebee's aid, Optimus then successfully fights off the attack, defeating Dirge in the process. After temporarily assuming leadership of the Autobots in Zeta Prime's absence, Optimus leads an assault to retake Iacon, which is slowly being destroyed by the Decepticons' Dark Energon corruptors. Optimus' team, including Ironhide, ultimately destroys the corruptors and retakes Iacon from the Decepticon forces, before receiving another transmission from Zeta Prime, who reveals he is being held captive at a prison in Kaon.

Optimus leads a mission to rescue him, joined by Bumblebee and Ironhide, and with Jetfire's coordination. They manage to infiltrate and sneak their way around the prison, but are eventually discovered by Onslaught, whom they soon defeat. Now that the entire prison is aware of their presence, the Autobots invading Kaon fight their way to Zeta Prime's cell. After surviving an ambush by one of the prison's wardens, who releases numerous well-armed prisoners to fight them, they finally reach Zeta, only to find that he is mortally wounded. Optimus returns with his body to the Autobot High Council, who make him the new Prime and task him with saving Cybertron's core from the Dark Energon. He approaches Grimlock and Swoop for assistance on his mission, and convinces the former to help after proving his strength in combat. While they're distracted however, the Decepticons capture Swoop, so Optimus and Grimlock embark on a mission to rescue him, clashing with Cyclonus' forces. After defeating Cyclonus, they find Swoop, who has been experimented on with Dark Energon and gone berserk, but manage to restore him to normal using the machinery around the laboratory, before escaping, as the place has been rigged by Cyclonus to explode. Grateful, both Grimlock and Swoop agree to temporarily join forces with Optimus.

Upon analyzing a sample of Cybertron's core, Ratchet and Jetfire scientifically determine that the only single thing preventing its healing are the Dark Energon corruptors, so an Autobot team led by Optimus heads there to destroy them before it is too late for Cybertron's core to be successfully healed. Fighting their way through Decepticon forces, the Autobots reach a Dark Energon-rich area where the corruptors are located. After destroying them and defeating Brawl, they approach the core, who reveals that it has been badly damaged and will need to reboot itself - the core will no longer be able to sustain the Transformers during this time, and, as the process will take thousands of years, the only hope for the Autobots is to evacuate Cybertron soon. Before leaving, the core gives Optimus a small piece of itself - the Matrix of Leadership - which will allow the core to be partially alive during the reboot process.

Before the Autobots can proceed with the evacuation, they need to destroy the Trypticon Space Station, which is destroying any Autobot ships attempting to leave Cybertron. Willing to protect the Matrix and the future of their race at all costs, Optimus leads a suicide mission to board and destroy the station from the inside, which is swarming with Decepticon forces. They eventually destroy the station's main cannon and power source, causing it to pummel towards Cybertron's surface. The Autobots manage to escape before the crash, only to then witness the station transforming into the Decepticon giant Trypticon, having been tempered with by the Decepticons. Optimus leads a final assault on Trypticon, ultimately besting him. With Trypticon successfully gone, the Autobots are free to leave Cybertron, while Optimus gives one last rousing speech, declaring that they will forever keep the planet alive in their memories, and that he and a few others will continue leading the fight against Megatron's forces until every Autobot would have evacuated.

== Development ==
=== Audio ===
The soundtrack for the Nintendo DS version games was composed by Jason Willey, Chris D'Ambrosio, and Adam Schneider. D'Ambrosio and Schneider both play in the electronic rock band Sentient Machine.

== Reception ==
Reception

Aggregate score
Aggregator	Score
Metacritic	62/100

The DS versions of War for Cybertron have received mixed or average reviews. IGN gave it a 6.5/10, stating that "War for Cybertron definitely isn't the worst of the bunch, and at the very least it's clear that this wasn't done as a quick cash-in."
