= Transformers: Cybertron Adventures =

2010 video game

- North American box art
- Developer: Next Level Games
- Publisher: Activision
- Platform: Wii
- Release: NA: June 22, 2010; AU: June 23, 2010; EU: June 25, 2010
- Genre: Third-person shooter
- Modes: Single-player, multiplayer

Transformers: Cybertron Adventures is an action-adventure video game based on the Transformers franchise, developed by Next Level Games and published by Activision. It is a companion game to High Moon Studios' Transformers: War for Cybertron, released exclusively for the Wii in June 2010. Like War for Cybertron, it features separate campaigns for the Autobots and the Decepticons, with the player being able to choose either faction to play as. The game received mixed to negative reviews from critics.

== Gameplay ==
Transformers: Cybertron Adventures is played as a rail shooter instead of a third person shooter like War for Cybertron

Transformers: Cybertron Adventures features separate campaigns for the Autobots and Decepticons, but instead of being a third person shooter like War for Cybertron, this game is a rail shooter, utilizing a gameplay similar to Time Crisis series. Players must defeat a group of enemies in one area from a cover point. After all enemies are defeated, the character will move along a pre-defined path to another area, and so on.

Occasionally during gameplay the character will transform into vehicle, and the player must control them to reach one point, destroying obstacles on the way. Offline co-op is also featured. Each campaign has 8 levels and a challenge mode allows player to replay campaign missions with four extra objectives in each mission.

The player is given four main weapons that are common to all twelve of the game's playable characters. If a player destroys several enemies, the player receives a combo that ranges from X2 to X5. Combos will not only increase the player's score, but will also dramatically increase the strength of the player's weapons while active. Taking cover will cause the player's combo to be drained rapidly.

== Synopsis ==
=== Setting ===
Cybertron Adventures is set on the planet Cybertron, prior to the Transformers' contact with the planet Earth. Robotic in nature, each Transformer has the ability to transform from their robot mode to an alternate form, usually a vehicle, such as a tank or jet. The Transformers are engaged in total civil war with one another, with two factions emerging: the Decepticons, a splinter group led by the powerful and ruthless Megatron, who seeks to conquer Cybertron to force a regime change, perceiving the current leadership as weak and corrupt; and the Autobots, led by the inexperienced, yet brave and inspiring Optimus Prime, who fights against Megatron's tyranny and seeks to restore peace and justice to Cybertron. In the game, the Decepticons seek to completely wipe out their rivals with the aid of a massive Decepticon known as Trypticon, who can use the powerful Dark Energon—a more dangerous and destructive version of Energon, the substance which powers all Transformers—to his advantage, while the Autobots try to defeat this new threat.

While the game still features two different campaigns, one from the Autobots' perspective and one from the Decepticons', and the player may choose to play either of them, just like in War for Cybertron, the campaigns take place simultaneously rather than one after the other, and the plot is different from other versions of the game.

=== Characters ===
Autobots
Air Raid; Bumblebee; Ironhide; Jetfire	Optimus Prime; Ratchet^{a}; Sideswipe
Decepticons
Barricade; Megatron; Skywarp; Soundwave	Starscream; Thundercracker; Trypticon^{a}

^a Not a playable character

=== Plot ===
==== Autobot campaign ====
As the massive Decepticon Trypticon attacks the Autobots' capital city of Iacon, the Autobots attempt to fend him off. Sideswipe scours the blast site for Autobot survivors, rescuing an injured Ratchet in the process, while Bumblebee and Ironhide are sent to the Decepticon capital city of Kaon to retrieve intel on Trypticon. Though they are caught and imprisoned, they manage to escape with Air Raid's help, and Ironhide reports that Trypticon is spreading Dark Energon - which is poisonous to Autobots but not Decepticons - through Cybertron's core, making the planet uninhabitable for the Autobots. As Optimus orders the evacuation of the planet, Air Raid is sent into the planet's core to sabotage the Energon Bridge that feeds energy to Trypticon. Once he succeeds, the Decepticons lead a new attack against Iacon, while Bumblebee escorts supply convoys and Air Raid fights Decepticon Seekers led by Skywarp and Thundercracker, whom he defeats. Eventually, Trypticon is repaired and begins destroying the escaping Autobot ships, so Jetfire is sent to destroy the relay stations that transfer Energon into Trypticon. He is successful, and Trypticon crashes into Iacon, where Optimus leads a final attack against the massive Decepticon, finally killing him. Afterwards, Optimus leads with the spread of Dark Energon halted, the Autobots are able to remain on Cybertron and continue their war against the Decepticons.

==== Decepticon campaign ====
During Trypticon's attack on Iacon, Megatron scours ground zero of Trypticon's blast and hunts down the Autobot survivors, ultimately defeating Ratchet. Meanwhile, Starscream is sent to protect the Energon relay stations from orbital debris and succeeds, despite not enjoying any moment of it. While the Decepticons are busy attacking Iacon, the Autobots infiltrate their capital city of Kaon, but Soundwave and Barricade intercept the intruders. Bumblebee and Ironhide are captured, and the former is interrogated with neural scanners for key strategical sites in Iacon. Elsewhere, Megatron plans to attack Iacon to drive the Autobots out of their stronghold once and for all, and dispatches Skywarp to attack various key locations within Iacon so that a full assault can take place. At the same time, Starscream is sent to Cybertron's core to repair Trypticon's damaged Energon Bridge, only to be scolded by Megatron. Fed up with Megatron's constant scolding and disdain, Starscream attempts to attack Megatron, who effortlessly subdues him and places in the front line of the invasion force as punishment. The Decepticons then launch a full-scale assault on Iacon, only to discover the Autobots are evacuating, so Thundercracker is sent to place homing devices on the escaping Autobot ships so that Trypticon can shoot them down. However, Trypticon fails to shoot down the Autobot Council's ship, and is then sabotaged and rendered vulnerable by the Autobots. With the rest of the Decepticons scattered throughout Iacon, Megatron is left alone to fend off the Autobot siege against Trypticon. Realizing that he won't be able to hold off the Autbots for long and that Trypticon will inevitably be destroyed, Megatron salvages his data core, before fleeing and leaving Trypticon to be finished off by the Autobots. Later, Megatron reveals to his minions that the salvaged data core contains the secrets of Dark Energon, meaning that the Decepticons still have the advantage in the war.

== Reception ==
Reception

Aggregate score
Aggregator	Score
Metacritic	41/100

Review scores
Publication	Score
Destructoid	7/10
GamesRadar+	1/5
IGN	3.5/10
Nintendo World Report	4/10

Unlike the well-received PC, PlayStation 3 and Xbox 360 versions, Cybertron Adventures received mostly negative reviews, averaging only 41 out of 100 at Metacritic. IGN scored it a 3.5/10, citing poor textures and animations, "boring" environments, and a "miserable" gameplay experience that "even co-op cannot save". It did, however, praise the music and in particular, Peter Cullen's performance as Optimus Prime, calling it "the single saving grace of Cybertron Adventures." Destructoid was the only reviewer to give a positive review, giving Cybertron Adventures a 7.0. Reviewer James Stephanie Sterling said it was "definitely not as great in the gameplay department as War for Cybertron" but that it had a "superior narrative and decent arcade action."
