= Transformers: War for Cybertron =

2010 video game

- North American box art featuring Optimus Prime, with Starscream in the background (Note: This is one half of the box art. The other features Megatron against one of Cybertron's moons as another Transformer is shot, losing part of their leg, while Soundwave speeds on in the background.)
- Developer: High Moon Studios
- Publisher: Activision
- Director: Matt Tieger
- Producer: Chuck Yager
- Designer: Matt Krystek
- Programmer: Andrew Zaferakis
- Artist: Ivan Power
- Writers: Dan Jolley; E. Daniel Arey
- Composer: Tyler Bates
- Series: Transformers
- Engine: Unreal Engine 3
- Platforms: Microsoft Windows; PlayStation 3; Xbox 360
- Release: NA: June 22, 2010; PAL: June 25, 2010
- Genre: Third-person shooter
- Modes: Single-player, multiplayer

Transformers: War for Cybertron is a third-person shooter video game based on the Transformers franchise, developed by High Moon Studios and published by Activision. It was released for Xbox 360, PlayStation 3, and Microsoft Windows in June 2010. Released at the same time were two portable versions for the Nintendo DS, one featuring an Autobot campaign, and the other a Decepticon campaign, and a game for the Wii, Transformers: Cybertron Adventures, which was developed by Next Level Games and utilizes the same characters and setting as War for Cybertron.

One of the first two pieces of Transformers media to take place in the new "Aligned" continuity, (Note: The novel Transformers: Exodus, also set in the "Aligned" continuity, was released at the same time as the game.) the game is set on the Transformers' home planet of Cybertron, prior to their arrival on Earth, the game depicts the deadly civil war between the heroic Autobots and villainous Decepticons. Players may pick either faction to play as, as each has its own separate campaign (though the Decepticon campaign chronologically takes place first). The game's plot revolves around Dark Energon, a more dangerous and destructive version of Energon, the substance which powers all Transformers. While the Decepticon leader Megatron seeks this substance for himself, believing it will allow him to return the planet to its "golden age", the Autobots, led by Optimus Prime, attempt to stop him, knowing it would instead doom their homeworld.

War for Cybertron received generally favorable reviews, with many viewing it as an improvement over past Transformers games. It was praised for its multiplayer, character designs, and voice acting, with criticism reserved for the visual design of the game's setting. A sequel, Transformers: Fall of Cybertron, was released in August 2012, and a third game, Transformers: Rise of the Dark Spark - which serves as a crossover with the live-action film series and bridges the gap between War for Cybertron and Fall of Cybertron - was released in June 2014. The multiplayer servers for the Windows, PlayStation 3 and Xbox 360 versions were discontinued in 2020, as with many of Activision's other Transformers titles.

== Gameplay ==
War for Cybertron is played from a third-person perspective. Transformers are classified into four main categories: Leader, Soldier, Scientist, and Scout. Each character in the campaign is classified as one of these types, and their weaponry, abilities and vehicle form are largely influenced by their character class. Players can change between forms at will, and each form has unique abilities. While in robot form characters can also collect different weapons, reminiscent of those found in first-person shooters. While in vehicle form each character can boost their speed. The player character has a regenerating shield and health, the latter of which does not regenerate automatically and must be replenished by collecting health packs that may either be found throughout levels, or by defeating opponents.

Each campaign level gives the player a choice of three Transformers. The campaign can be played in single-player or cooperatively via online multiplayer, and players can enter or leave the game at any time. If fewer than three players are present, the game's AI controls the remaining playable characters. Cooperative and competitive modes of the game are limited to online play, with no split screen features available. The game's levels are designed to allow characters to comfortably navigate and play the game in either mode.

=== Multiplayer ===
War for Cybertron's competitive multiplayer game modes do not allow players to control official, named characters, and instead must design their own Transformer. Similar to the campaign, generic multiplayer characters are split into four character classes. Contrary to the campaign, however, each created character features some amount of customization. Players can select a base model and vehicle form, then alter major colors for their character and modify weapon loadouts and abilities based on that character class. The multiplayer aspect also features an experience and leveling system, including perks, and upgrades reminiscent of Call of Duty: Modern Warfare 2 (2009), another Activision game.

War for Cybertron has several multiplayer modes to choose from. Deathmatch is a free-for-all game type where the player with the most kills at the end of the game is the winner. In Team Deathmatch players are divided into Autobot and Decepticon teams. The winning team is the one who earns the most kills. Conquest is a capture-and-hold style game, similar to the conquest mode found in the Battlefield and Star Wars: Battlefront series. Multiple control points are spread across the level. The object is for players to capture enemy control points for their team by standing near them for a set amount of time while defending their own control points. In Countdown to Extinction players must take an active bomb and place it at an enemy base, similar to the Assault mode in the Halo series. Power Struggle is the game's equivalent to the common King of the Hill game type. Finally, Code of Power is a mode consisting of two and a half minute rounds where teams fight for a giant melee weapon.

Also available is the Escalation game mode, the only multiplayer mode where players can control characters from the campaign or downloadable content. Players choose a faction and then work cooperatively to defeat continuous waves of enemy robots until all players are defeated, similar to the Horde mode found in Gears of War and the Halo series' Firefight game modes. Players earn credits by defeating enemies which can be used to unlock ammunition, weaponry, health and new areas in each map.

== Synopsis ==
=== Setting ===
War for Cybertron is set on the planet Cybertron, prior to the Transformers' contact with the planet Earth (70-65 million years ago), and is set in the series' Aligned continuity family. Robotic in nature, each Transformer has the ability to transform from their robot mode to an alternate form, usually a vehicle, such as a tank or jet. The Transformers are engaged in total civil war with one another, with two factions emerging: the Decepticons, a splinter group led by the powerful and ruthless Megatron, who seeks to conquer Cybertron to force a regime change, perceiving the current leadership as weak and corrupt; and the Autobots, who follow the command of Zeta Prime and seek to put an end to Megatron's revolution and restore peace and order to Cybertron. However, after Zeta Prime is killed in battle, an inexperienced leader named Optimus must take his place and lead the Autobots to victory before Megatron can corrupt the planet, itself a Transformer, with Dark Energon.

Both factions have their own campaign, each containing five chapters, and players may choose either to play through first. Chronologically, the Decepticon campaign takes place first, with the Autobot story directly following it.

=== Characters ===
Autobots
Arcee^{c}^{e}; Air Raid; Bumblebee	Ironhide; Jazz^{a}^{b}; Jetfire	Omega Supreme^{c}^{d}; Optimus Prime; Ratchet; Scattershot^{b}	Sideswipe; Silverbolt; Warpath; Zeta Prime^{b}^{c}
Decepticons
Barricade; Brawl; Breakdown; Dead End^{b}; Demolishor^{a}^{b}	Frenzy^{c}^{d}; Laserbeak^{c}^{d}; Megatron; Onslaught^{b}	Rumble^{c}^{d}; Shockwave^{a}^{b}; Skywarp; Slipstream^{e}	Soundwave; Starscream; Thundercracker; Trypticon^{c}^{d}

^aOriginally a pre-order bonus
^bDownloadable content for multiplayer
^cNot playable in campaign
^dNot playable in multiplayer
^eUnlocked as a multiplayer character

=== Decepticon campaign ===
The Decepticon leader Megatron seeks to return Cybertron to its "Golden Age" using the legendary Dark Energon, an unstable, corrupting substance of immense power which is rumored to be kept in an orbital research station guarded by the neutral Sky Commander Starscream. Megatron leads the Decepticons, including Barricade and Brawl, in an assault on the station, fighting their way through Starscream's troops and seizing control of the Dark Energon manufacturing plant. After Megatron successfully immerses himself in it, Starscream offers his fealty to Megatron in exchange for teaching him how to control Dark Energon. Megatron accepts when Starscream reveals he knows how to manufacture more Dark Energon. Shocked by Starscream's betrayal, his partner Jetfire escapes to warn the Autobot leader Zeta Prime, to which Megatron allows.

Now Decepticons, Starscream and his fellow Seekers, Thundercracker and Skywarp, are ordered by Megatron to reactivate an Energon Bridge beneath Cybertron's surface, which will feed the station with raw Energon and allow more Dark Energon to be manufactured. Once they succeed, Megatron develops a plan to infect Cybertron's core with Dark Energon and launches a full-scale assault on Iacon City, the Autobot capital, to obtain the Omega Key, which will grant him access to the core. As the Decepticons lay siege on the city, Megatron, Soundwave, and Breakdown confront Zeta Prime, defeating him and obtaining the Key. However, Zeta reveals that the Key is not the actual means to unlocking the core, but rather a device that summons the real key: a colossal Autobot called Omega Supreme.

With Omega pursuing them and destroying everything in his path, Megatron, Soundwave, and Breakdown devise a plan to lure him into an ambush using commandeered Autobot turrets. They succeed, and Omega is shot down, plummeting into Cybertron's lower levels. Omega makes a last stand against the Decepticons but is soon corrupted with Dark Energon and taken prisoner. After forcing Omega to unlock Cybertron's core, Megatron infects it with Dark Energon, which quickly begins to spread its corruption over the entire planet.

=== Autobot campaign ===
While defending Iacon from the invading Decepticons, Autobot soldier Optimus is informed by scout Bumblebee about Zeta Prime's presumed death. Temporarily assuming leadership of the Autobots, Optimus recruits Bumblebee and Ratchet to reactivate Iacon's defenses and communication grid. The trio then travels to the Decagon Plaza and defeats Starscream, thwarting the Decepticon attack. Soon after, the Autobots receive a distress call from Zeta, who is still alive and being held prisoner in the Decepticon capital city of Kaon. Skepticism of the validity of the distress call arises from Bumblebee and Ratchet, to which Optimus pushes aside. Optimus, Bumblebee, and Sideswipe allow themselves to be captured in order to infiltrate the prison complex, whereupon they break free with the help of Air Raid. However, the distress signal made by Zeta Prime is revealed to be a trap laid by the Decepticon Leader, Megatron. Megatron sends them back to a different prison cell and strip them of their weaponry. They break out, gain their weaponry back, and rescue the other Autobot prisoners. As the prisoners escape using Decepticon transports, the trio discovers that Zeta Prime is alive, and being held in lower levels within Kaon. With this knowledge, the trio fights their way to Zeta's cell, guarded by Soundwave and his minions Frenzy, Rumble, and Laserbeak. The Autobots fight them off, but Zeta succumbs to his injuries and Decepticon torture. Optimus brings Zeta's body before the Autobot High Council, who name him the new and last Prime, and inform him of Megatron's activities.

Tasked with purging Cybertron's core of Dark Energon, Optimus, his friend Ironhide, and rookie Autobot soldier Warpath travel to the core's entrance, discovering it has been converted into a Decepticon stronghold. The trio frees Omega Supreme, who has been tortured with Dark Energon, and defend Ratchet while he heals him, whereupon Omega grants the Autobots access to the core. Fighting their way past Deception soldiers and a Cybertronian worm corrupted by Dark Energon, the Autobots eventually reach the core, which speaks to Optimus and reveals itself as a Transformer. It explains that the only way to fix the damages done by the Dark Energon is to reboot itself, which will leave Cybertron a cold, barren and lifeless planet for millions of years. However, the core can stay partially alive during this time if Optimus carries a small piece of it with him. Optimus accepts the burden and the core bestows the Autobot Matrix of Leadership into Optimus' chest.

With Cybertron beginning to shut down, Optimus orders the evacuation of all Autobot cities. As the evacuation transports reach orbit, many are destroyed by Starscream's orbital space station, which Megatron has converted into a superweapon. The Aerialbots—Silverbolt, Jetfire, and Air Raid—lead a secret mission to infiltrate the station and destroy it from within. However, they soon discover that the station is actually a massive Decepticon known as Trypticon, who transforms into his robot form. The Aerialbots battle Trypticon, who is knocked out of orbit and crash-lands in Iacon. Optimus confronts him there and defeats him with Bumblebee and Ironhide's help. Later, Optimus commissions a massive vessel known as the Ark to transport the remaining Autobots into space, with only a small group led by Optimus staying behind on Cybertron to fight off Megatron's forces for as long as possible.

== Development and marketing ==
War for Cybertron was announced December 16, 2009, and was released in North America on June 22, 2010, with the PAL region release following on June 25, 2010. It is powered by Unreal Engine 3. Physics for the game are handled using the Havok physics library. A demo was released on June 10, 2010, which allowed for players to play various multiplayer matches using two of the game's character classes. Developer High Moon Studios designed the friendly AI so that as a player progresses through the story any accompanying characters will help the player, but still require the player to advance through the game. "The buddies don't advance the story for you. They get to the point to kinda show you where to go, but then they'll take up defensive positions and wait for you to progress the story" said Game Director Matt Tieger. "They're not finishing objectives for you, but they like to stay near you, they'll heal you if you get too wounded, they're pretty smart."

=== Setting and plot ===
Concept art of Megatron. The developers worked closely with Hasbro to create a new look for each character.

War for Cybertron developer High Moon Studios and publisher Activision worked closely with Hasbro to create the design and story for the game. "I want to make the game I've been waiting 25 years to play" said Tieger. The studio brought the concept and idea to Hasbro for approval. It began with a sketch of Bumblebee. "That was that first sketch that we slid across the table to Hasbro and said 'What do you guys think?' And that's where it all started" said Tieger. High Moon presented the idea of setting the game on Cybertron during the Transformers' civil war between the Autobots and Decepticons. Aaron Archer, Senior Design Director for Hasbro, stated of the Cybertron-based setting "that's a really cool place [...] and the early days of that civil war between the Autobots and Decepticons was a story that hadn't really been fleshed out in any format."

Each of the characters was totally redesigned for the game, taking cues from previous iterations from the Transformers lore. "What they've allowed us to do is take a licensed property and treat it like a brand new IP" stated Tieger. The vehicle modes for car-based characters initially consisted of wheels, however, the developers found that it crippled gameplay by removing the player's ability to strafe while in vehicle mode. Taking the dilemma to Hasbro, the two companies agreed that characters would turn their wheels down and hover while in vehicle mode, allowing for more movement. The vehicles would then revert to the traditional wheeled mode while using a character's boost, maintaining what the Transformers license had established with previous canon.

The world of Cybertron was designed in such a way that the Transformers would have a proper scale on their homeworld. "It doesn't make sense that things would be smaller than them in their world," Tieger said, adding "the key character in scale was making their world gigantic and huge." Matt Krystek, Lead Designer at High Moon stated that since the game is not tied to a movie they were able to tell their own story. He cited the G1 universe as the inspiration for the game. Jim Daly, Lead Concept Artist at High Moon also cited the G1 universe as the main inspiration for the design of Cybertron itself, also stating that there were elements from Disney's TRON, Blade Runner, and the Aliens franchise.

Hasbro's Aaron Archer stated the game would be only part of a bigger group of media. "This won't be the only touch point. It's a big place that we're going to build off of." At a BotCon 2010 panel, War for Cybertron Creative Director Matt Tieger stated Activision is currently in talks with Hasbro on creating additional titles. He also added that Hasbro is "considering" expanding the brand further into the realm of video games. Joe Moscone, Senior Account Manager for Hasbro's public relations team, further clarified that War for Cybertron is in the same continuity as the Transformers: Prime animated series and Transformers: Exodus novel, and that this would be the primary continuity going forward. Hasbro has released a toy line based on the War for Cybertron setting. Transforming figures of Optimus Prime, Bumblebee, Megatron and Soundwave from the game have been released by Hasbro under the Transformers: Generations banner.

=== Audio ===
The soundtrack for the console versions was composed by Tyler Bates. The ending theme is "Till All Are One" by Stan Bush, from his 2007 album In This Life. Peter Cullen returns to voice Optimus, having voiced the character several times in the Transformers franchise. Other voice actors include Kari Wahlgren as Arcee, Liam O'Brien as Air Raid, Johnny Yong Bosch as Bumblebee, Fred Tatasciore as Megatron, Ratchet, Omega Supreme, and Trypticon, Keith Szarabajka as Ironhide, Steven Blum as Barricade and Shockwave, Nolan North as Brawl, and Sam Riegel as Starscream.

=== Downloadable content ===
Two downloadable content packs were produced for console versions of the game. The first, entitled simply Character and Map Pack 01, was announced on July 2, 2010. Character and Map Pack 01 contains the three previously pre-order exclusive characters, Demolishor, Jazz and Shockwave, as well as two new characters, Onslaught and Scattershot. Four new multiplayer maps are also included. Two maps are exclusive to the game's Escalation mode, while the other two are used in all other game modes. It was released July 27, 2010. The second pack, known as Character and Map Pack 02, adds the characters Dead End and Zeta Prime and five new maps. It was released September 7, 2010.

== Reception ==
Transformers: War for Cybertron

Aggregate scores
Aggregator	Score
GameRankings	76.25% (PC); 78.47% (PS3); 79.45% (X360)
Metacritic	75/100 (PC); 77/100 (PS3); 76/100 (X360)

Review scores
Publication	Score
1Up.com	B+
Destructoid	8/10
Eurogamer	6/10
G4	4/5
Game Informer	8.5/10
GamePro	4/5
GameSpot	6.5/10
IGN	9/10
PlayStation Universe	7.5/10

Critical reaction has been generally positive, with many reviews citing that War for Cybertron is an improvement over past Transformers games. Aggregate scores across all three platforms were fairly uniform. The PC version holds a score of 76.25% at GameRankings and 76/100 at Metacritic. The PlayStation 3 version has a 78.47% and 77/100 at the two aggregate sites, while the Xbox 360 version reports scores of 79.45% and 76/100. Individual review scores ranged from a score of 5 out of ten by Edge, to a 94% approval by Gaming Trend.

Reviewers praised the in-game voice acting. G4TV's Matt Kell noted that Peter Cullen's voice work as Optimus was "commanding and familiar", adding that the other actors "even do their best to replicate the voices of the original cartoon." Mike Nelson of Game Informer agreed and noted the game's excellent dialogue, stating "the script has all the overwrought melodrama you'd expect from giant talking robots." Several critics also gave high marks for War for Cybertron's multiplayer. IGN's Arthur Gies noted the influences from Unreal Championship, Tribes, Team Fortress 2, and Battlefield: Bad Company 2 adding that "War for Cybertron leverages its transformation mechanic to create something that feels shockingly new." Tom McShea of GameSpot noted that the game's Escalation mode provided a Transformers twist on Gears of War's Horde mode. GamePro's Kat Bailey noted that the multiplayer was "probably the most appealing part of the package", adding it had a "strong suite [of] options." 1UP.com's Matt Miller lauded the ability to play through the game's campaign with up to three players online, as did G4TV's Matt Kell. Both reviewers also praised the new character designs, with Kell calling them "inventive." Wired.com's John Mix Meyer gave praise to the game's campaign length, stating "The game's 10-hour single-player campaign means there's plenty of time for the crazy transformations to strut their stuff." John Hamblin of Eurogamer praised the transformation animations. He stated players will "occasionally wish there was a Max Payne slow-mo option so you could appreciate the nuance of these feats a little more."

The repetitive visual design of Cybertron drew criticism from critics. Tom McShea of GameSpot stated that "the majority of the game entails walking through similar-looking corridors." Giant Bomb's Jeff Gerstmann also cited repetitive visuals, but conceded that "the metallic world of Cybertron doesn't lend itself particularly well to a lot of environmental variety." 1UP.com's Matt Miller also raised issue with the repetitive visuals, but provided a counterpoint in saying "there are a host of features in place to save the game from spiraling into mediocrity." John Hamblin of Eurogamer and Tom McShea of GameSpot also pointed out the game's vast lack of ammunition. "Watching Lord Megatron repeatedly suffering the indignity of being shot at by drones while he desperately scours the debris looking for an elusive ammo box [...] is just sad" stated Hamblin. He was further critical of the game's checkpoint system, which often leaves players in difficult situations upon respawning.

The first downloadable content pack received mixed reception from IGN's Arthur Gies. While he praised the design of the multiplayer maps, he noted that the lack of online players for War for Cybertron hurt the ability to play the new content online. Gies stated that he attempted to host the two Escalation maps, adding that he waited for several minutes for players to join, but had no success. "That's the problem", he stated. "War for Cybertron's multiplayer is all-but-abandoned." Gies went on to cite a peak population of approximately 4,600 players on Xbox Live, 800 on PlayStation Network, and only 158 players on the PC version at the time of his writing. Despite the lack of online players he felt the content may fit a player's needs, stating "If you've got nine other friends who bought War for Cybertron and can set up your own private matches, then Character and Map Pack 01 might be worth checking out."

The game sold 219,000 units in the United States.

== Sequel ==
A sequel to War for Cybertron was announced in November 2010. "This is the most highly-rated, critical success of any game that's had the Hasbro brand yet and we're looking forward to a sequel in 2012," stated Hasbro representative Mark Belcher. The game was slated for a 2012 release, and its official title, Transformers: Fall of Cybertron, was revealed on October 6, 2011. It is a direct continuation of War for Cybertron, completing the story of the planet Cybertron's demise and the exodus of the Transformers. One new Autobot character, Grimlock, was confirmed in the title announcement.
