= Gerspunken =

- Origin: Mayrhofen, Austria
- Genres: Glam metal
- Years active: 2006-present
- Label: Independent
- Members: Bruno Speltervasser, Hans Burstein, Karl Steiner, Gertrude Steiner, Reinhold Meyer
- Past members: Arnold Speltervasser,
- Website: Gerspunken Official Site

Gerspunken's 2013 Single 'Hard Love Machine'

Gerspunken is a glam/metal band from Mayrhofen, Austria.

Formed in 2002, the band released their first album, Geworden Spunker! ('Get Spunked!') in 2005. Gerspunken's combination of classical instrumentals and themes into their tracks (The band's front-man and bassist Bruno Speltervasser and lead guitarist Hans Burstein met whilst studying at the Konservatorium Wien, Vienna's Conservatorium of Music, in 2001) is unique in the glam genre. This facet of their composition has attracted mixed criticism, as has their utilization of electronic music generation.

== Origins ==
The group's origins can be traced to the time Speltervasser and Burstein spent at the Konservatorium Wien in 2001. The duo were familiar with each other from their youth in the Tyrolean town of Mayrhofen, and had worked together for a short period at the Peter Habeler Mountaineering Academy during the summer of 2000. Burstein, born in Poland, moved to Austria when he was seven. The pair were accomplished young musicians at this point but played exclusively in the classical genre, Burstein as a flautist and Speltervasser playing Violin and Viola for the Tyrolean Youth Orchestra. Burstein took up a position at the Konservatorium in late 2000 at the suggestion of his parents, and Speltervasser joined his friend at the institution the following year.

=== Konservatorium Incident ===
During 2002 the duo caused considerable drama at the Conservatorium, which Speltervasser accounted to his disenchantment with the rigid and uncreative structures of the institution. Immediately before the annual enrollment, Burstein changed his name by deed-poll from Hans Rinehold Burstein to Megatrön, with the specific intention of irritating the college staff who by law were forced to print the Annual Vienna Orchestral Roll with Burstein's new legal name. When asked by the Konservatorium's Dean about the deed-poll incident, Burstein claimed that he had been "..inspired by Megatron's example of fortitude and leadership in the quest of the Decepticons for the Creation Matrix," and that the gratuitous heavy metal umlaut was the "sign of the beast." When the Konservatorium demanded that he change the registered name, Burstein refused and consulted a friend engaged in legal studies and successfully petitioned the authorities to allow him to register his new legal name in the Tutonic Blackletter of the Mötley Crüe Logo, thus becoming the only person in Austrian history to have legal name in a specific font. After his expulsion from the Konservatorium, Burstein changed his name back to that of his birth.

Disenchanted with the classical establishment, the duo resigned from their courses in 2002, joining with fellow Mayrhofen local Karl Steiner, then living in Vienna playing drums for a local band, and Munich guitarist and singer Reinhold Mayer.

During the summer of 2002 the band played in many venues throughout Vienna and at Tyrol, and were the resident act at the Blue Tomato Nightclub on Johnstrasse in Vienna.

== Geworden Spunker! ==
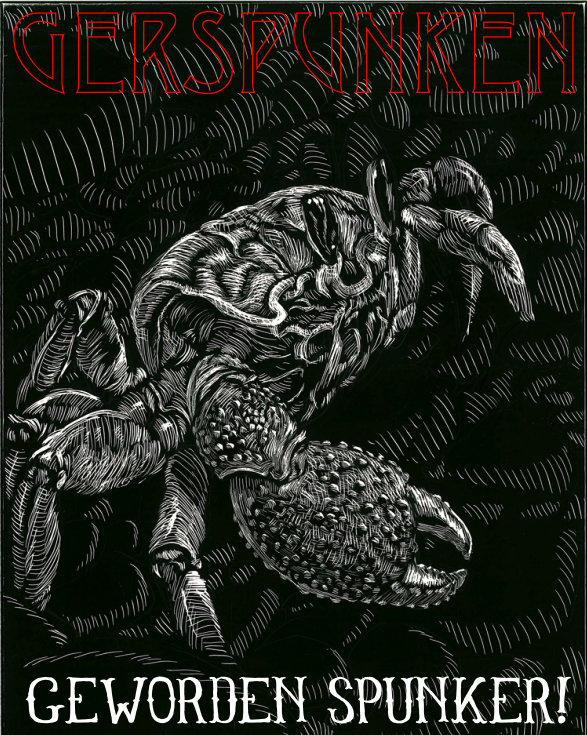
Poster from gerspunken's 2006 "Geworden Spunker!" tour

In early 2005 the group released their first album, on which they had worked throughout the previous year at their self-titled “SpunkStudio” in Mayrhofen. “Geworden Spunker!” ('Get Spunked!') was touted by Ablaze Magazine as “…the heaviest offering from any band in Germany or Austria in 2005. How can these guys still hear?”

“Geworden Spunker!” met with mixed reviews, however. Das RuhrMetal.de, an online Punk e-zine from the Ruhr region, claimed “…this cacophony is fit only for the fire. These young men seem set on single-handedly destroying an entire genre.”

=== Delphinjäger ===
Track 2 on this album, entitled Delphinjäger, (Dolphin Hunter) incited rage among Austria's Green community. “We believe this to be an astonishing insult to such a precious species,” said Greenpeace CCE spokeswoman Marie Sheen. The line from the chorus “Bumsen Sie jene faulen grauen Fische, essen Sie sie alle,” (“Fuck those lazy grey fish, lets have some dinner,”) was particularly contentious.

During the 2006 Australia/New Zealand tour, Burstein was asked on an interview with Richard James of Fbi 94.5fm about the issue. “I had a traumatic experience with a dolphin once,” he explained. “When I was twelve, I was swimming with my male nurse Sven on a family holiday at Hossegor, and what you could call a freak dolphin incident occurred.”

== New Album ==
In October 2007 Gerspunken announced the release of their long-awaited second studio album, entitled "Hassen Sie Nicht Freiheit!" ("Don't Hate Freedom!".) In a press conference in Mayrhofen, Speltervasser explained the new direction the group's creative process had taken during their time working on "Hassen sie nicht Freiheit!" "We are a much tighter unit now, much, much tighter," Speltervasser explained to Carmen Tomachich of German punk E-zine SOUND.de. "The creative juices are flowing in the "SpunkStudio" and we're all getting in on the act together, instead of just me and Hans like it used to be. Even Arnold is involved, and his wife Sara also comes sometimes as well. It's a much bigger process now." The album's cover has, like much of Gerspunken's art and music, attracted considerable negative criticism.

=== Single Release ===
The first single from the "Don't Hate Freedom" album was released in the March 2008 amidst a storm of controversy. Rockster Records, the band's label, refused to carry the Single if included the track "Real Men Fuck Women" which the band refused to drop from the record. Without the support of Rockster the band released the disk under their own label with "Real Men Fuck Women" as the title track.

== Relocation Overseas ==
In the Spring of 2013 the band re-located permanently to Sydney, Australia, with a new stripped-back lineup consisting of Spelterwasser on bass and vocals, Burstein on guitar, and Steiner on drums. By 2014 the group had brought Steiner's Italian half-sister, Gertrude, on board as the lead vocalist, leaving Speltervasser unencumbered to work on the bass-lines which had, up to this point, been "...the weakest fish at the bottom of a barrel of other slightly less weak fish." The group had spent considerable time in Sydney and Melbourne over the past years and explained that the move was driven primarily by lifestyle factors and an emerging alternative culture in Australia. In September the group announced that they had almost completed a new EP, entitled "Hard Love Machine," and would gig the new record in the Australian summer.
