= Transformers (Titan Magazines) =

British comic book series

Publication information
- Publisher: Titan Magazines
- Schedule: Monthly
- Format: Ongoing series
- Publication date: List: (vol. 1) July 2007 – 2009 (vol. 2) 2009–2011 (vol. 3) 2011 (vol. 4) 2011–2014 (vol. 5) June 2014 – September 2014
- No. of issues: 75
- Main character(s): Autobots; Decepticons

Creative team
- Written by: Simon Furman; Robin Etherington
- Artist(s): Geoff Senior; Andrew Wildman; Nick Roche
- Colorist(s): Robin Smith
- Editor(s): Steve White; Rona Simpson

Transformers was a British comic book series based on the Transformers toyline and film series, published monthly by Titan Magazines from 2007 to 2014. It initially featured strips re-printed from American comics and graphic novels, but later included original comic strips. The first issue was published in July 2007 to tie-in with the release of the Transformers feature film. The comic went through five different volumes and title changes before the final issue was published in August 2014 after a run of seven years.

== Publication history ==
Volume 1 ran for twenty-five issues before the second volume began in 2009 to tie-in with the theatrical release of Transformers: Revenge of the Fallen. Volume 3 began in 2011 to tie-in with the third film in the Paramount Pictures series, while a fourth volume launched soon after in conjunction with the animated series, Transformers: Prime. The fifth and final volume began publication in June 2014, coinciding with the release of the fourth Transformers film, Transformers: Age of Extinction. The title was ultimately cancelled after three issues, with the final issue going on sale on 21 August 2014.

For the last few issues of Volume 1, the Transformers: Universe toy line logo was used on the cover.

== Content ==
A typical issue of Transformers during its first volume would feature the following content:

- Introduction/Contents
- Comic strips
- Character profiles
- 'Cybertron Smackdown'
- Poster
- 'Top Gear' (feature on Transformers merchandise)
- 'Mech Mail' (reader letters and artwork)

== Strips ==
During the first volume, the comic printed three strips per issue. These included brand new strips written by Simon Furman, whose work continued into volume 2, and some reprints such as the Beast Wars series (also by Furman) and the Movie Prequel. By volume 3, the magazine had a lower page count and only one strip, now written by Robin Etherington, was typically included in each issue.

== Free gift ==
As is common for children's magazines in the UK, each issue came with a free cover gift. #1 had dog tags featuring either Autobot or Decepticon logos, #2 had removable tattoos, #3 had a keyring, which would be either the Autobots or Decepticons logo, and #4 had a set of four badges.

== Transformers Animated Comic ==
In October 2009, Titan debuted a second Transformers title, based on the animated TV series Transformers: Animated. However, the title would last only for three issues due to low sales. The first strip to be published in the magazine was 'Burnout' written by Simon Furman. Another strip in the first issue was an adaptation of the episode 'Blast from the Past', using stills from the show as comic panels.
