= Landfill (disambiguation) =

Landfill usually refers to a waste dump.

Landfill may also refer to:

- Land reclamation
- Landfill (Transformers), a character in the Transformers toy line
