= Transformers =

Japanese–American media franchise

- Franchise logo, 2014–present
- Created by: Takara; Hasbro
- Original work: Transformers
- Owners: Hasbro (International); TakaraTomy (Japan)
- Years: 1984–present
- Based on: Diaclone and Micro Change

Print publications
- Books: Complete list
- Comics: Complete list
- Magazine: Transformers

Films and television
- Films: Animated: The Transformers: The Movie; Beast Wars II: Lio Convoy's Close Call!; Prime Beast Hunters: Predacons Rising; Transformers One; Optimus Prime: Awakening; Live-action: Transformers; Revenge of the Fallen; Dark of the Moon; Age of Extinction; The Last Knight; Bumblebee; Rise of the Beasts
- Animated series: Complete list

Games
- Video games: Complete list

Audio
- Soundtracks: Transformers audio releases

Miscellaneous
- Toys: Generation 1; Generation 2; Beast Wars; Shattered Glass; Prime Wars Trilogy (Power of the Primes); War for Cybertron Trilogy
- Related franchises: Battle Beasts; G.I. Joe; GoBots; Brave Series

Transformers is a mecha media franchise produced by the American toy company Hasbro and the Japanese toy company TakaraTomy. It follows the heroic Autobots, led by Optimus Prime, and the villainous Decepticons, led by Optimus' arch-enemy Megatron. The Autobots and Decepticons comprise the two alien robot factions at war that can transform into other forms, such as vehicles and animals.

The Transformers franchise encompasses toys, animation, comic books, video games and films. As of 2011, it generated more than ¥2 trillion ($25 billion) in revenue, making it one of the highest-grossing media franchises of all time. The Transformers films, including the live-action film series, make up the 15th-highest-grossing film series, with $5.42 billion grossed over nine films Dark of the Moon (2011) and Age of Extinction (2014) crossed the $1 billion threshold, with Age of Extinction becoming the highest-grossing film of 2014.

== History ==
Classic Transformers franchise logo used until 2014

The franchise began in 1984 with The Transformers toy line, comprising transforming mecha toys from Takara's Diaclone and Micro Change toylines rebranded for Western markets. The term "Generation 1" (G1) covers both the animated television series The Transformers and the comic book series of the same name, which are further divided into Japanese, British and Canadian spin-offs. Sequels followed, such as the Generation 2 comic book and Beast Wars TV series, which became its own mini-universe. Generation 1 characters have been rebooted multiple times in the 21st century in comics from Dreamwave Productions (starting 2001), IDW Publishing (starting in 2005 and again in 2019), and Skybound Entertainment (beginning in 2023). There have been other incarnations of the story based on different toy lines during and after the 20th century. The first was the Robots in Disguise series, followed by three shows (Armada, Energon, and Cybertron) that constitute a single universe called the "Unicron Trilogy".

A live-action film series started in 2007, again distinct from previous incarnations, while the Transformers: Animated series merged concepts from the G1 continuity, the 2007 live-action film and the "Unicron Trilogy". For most of the 2010s, in an attempt to mitigate the wave of reboots, the "Aligned Continuity" was established, which included four series: Transformers: Prime and Transformers: Robots in Disguise, along with the preschool-oriented Transformers: Rescue Bots and Rescue Bots Academy. In 2018, Transformers: Cyberverse debuted, once again, distinct from the previous incarnations. Also in 2018, Hasbro launched a separate toy line called Transformers: War for Cybertron which featured three Netflix miniseries, releasing from 2020 to 2021. Another series, Transformers: EarthSpark, debuted in 2022, again separate from previous continuities. The 2024 animated film, Transformers One, once again takes place in a new continuity, as does the animated YouTube web series Transformers: Cyberworld.

Although a separate and competing franchise started in 1983, Tonka's GoBots became the intellectual property of Hasbro after their buyout of Tonka in 1991. Subsequently, the universe depicted in the animated series Challenge of the GoBots and follow-up film GoBots: Battle of the Rock Lords was retroactively established as an alternate universe within the Transformers multiverse. The likenesses of the GoBots were depicted in numerous Fun Publishing comics and the 2018 film Bumblebee.

== Common story elements ==
Many works of Transformers fiction revolve around two alien robot factions with the power to transform. These two factions hail from the planet Cybertron: the heroic Autobots, led by Optimus Prime, and the evil Decepticons, led by Megatron. The Autobots and Decepticons both have sub-teams like the Dinobots and Constructicons. Some interpretations of the lore replace them with their direct descendants, the Maximals and Predacons. Another villainous faction, the Terrorcons - heralds of Unicron - may also serve as a stand-in for the Decepticons. These factions may be present at the same time as their Autobot and Decepticon counterparts, and numerous sub-factions within both the Autobots and Decepticons exist. One such example is the Constructicons, a team of construction vehicles who may combine into the towering Devastator.

Both factions are at war for energon, an energy source that can power themselves and their planet. When their home planet Cybertron is rendered uninhabitable as a result of the war, both factions attempt to find more energy resources outside their planet. It is after this that they find their way to Earth; they may either crash-land into prehistoric Earth on their respective ships and lay dormant until the modern day, escape to Earth from Cybertron, or live amongst humans. While on Earth, they continue their war, now assuming new Earth vehicle, device, or beast forms. The Transformers are oftentimes aided by human allies like Spike and Sparkplug Witwicky and Mikaela Banes who are roped into their conflict; humans play a major role in Transformers: EarthSpark, which significantly changes the origin of new Transformers by introducing Terrans, Earth-born Transformers who are emotionally bonded to humans through special wearable cyber-sleeves.

A plot point introduced in The Transformers: The Movie (1986), to much infamy from fans, is the death of Optimus Prime. Depending on the story, Optimus may either be revived later in the work, or not at all; regardless, a new leader would be appointed. This plot point has since been featured in future Transformers media.

== Major fictional works ==
=== Television series ===
==== Transformers: Generation 1 (1984–1993) ====
Generation 1 is a retroactive term for the Transformers characters that appeared between 1984 and 1993. The Transformers began with the 1980s Japanese toy lines Micro Change and Diaclone. They presented robots who are able to transform into everyday vehicles, electronic items or weapons. Hasbro bought the Micro Change and Diaclone toys, and partnered with Takara. Marvel Comics was hired by Hasbro to create the backstory; editor-in-chief Jim Shooter wrote an overall story, and gave the task of creating the characters to writer Dennis O'Neil. Unhappy with O'Neil's work (although O'Neil created the name "Optimus Prime"), Shooter chose Bob Budiansky to create the characters. The original Transformers mecha were largely designed by Shōji Kawamori, the creator of the Japanese mecha anime franchise Macross (which was adapted into the Robotech franchise in North America). Kawamori came up with the idea of transforming mechs while working on the Diaclone and Macross franchises in the early 1980s (such as the VF-1 Valkyrie in Macross and Robotech), with his Diaclone mechs later providing the basis for Transformers.

Works of fiction based on The Transformers was commissioned by Hasbro to sell the toys. A comic was published by Marvel, which soon splintered into two timelines with completely different stories: one from America, and one from the United Kingdom. A TV series began around the same time; it was produced by Sunbow Productions and Marvel Productions, later Hasbro Productions. As with the comic, the show adapted the characters shown in the original toyline, including Optimus Prime, Megatron, Bumblebee, and Starscream, and introduced new characters as their toys were released.

The events of the series would be continued in the 1986 feature film The Transformers: The Movie, which is set in the future year of 2005. The Movie revolves around the emergence of the planet Transformer Unicron. Being an adaptation of the television show, which featured little stakes, Hasbro, wanting to introduce new toys for the 1986 line, mandated the deaths of named characters. Such deaths included Optimus Prime and Megatron, who was replaced by the end of the movie by Hot Rod/Rodimus Prime and Galvatron, respectively, amongst others. One unproduced draft featured all of the original Autobot characters dying in a last stand against the Decepticons. The Movie also featured guest voices from Leonard Nimoy as Galvatron, Scatman Crothers as Jazz, Casey Kasem as Cliffjumper, Orson Welles as Unicron and Eric Idle as the leader of the Junkions (Wreck-Gar, though unnamed in the movie). The Transformers theme tune for the film was performed by Lion with "Weird Al" Yankovic adding a song to the soundtrack. In its original release, the film received generally negative reviews and failed to recoup its production budget. Multiple rereleases saw the film recoup its costs, and it saw recent reappraisal, particularly after the debut of Michael Bay's films (see #Live-action film series (2007-present).

A third season, set a year after Unicron's destruction, followed up The Movie. The third season follows Rodimus Prime and his group of Autobots as they contend against the Decepticons, led by a re-emergent Galvatron. It reintroduces the Quintessons, the original creators of the Transformers until they rebelled, (Note: This appears to contradict background presented in the first two seasons of the series.) as a threat. Due to popular demand, Optimus Prime is resurrected at the conclusion of the third season after initially being depicted as a zombie earlier in the season.

While the American run of the series was followed by a three-part arc that served as the finale, the Japanese broadcast of the series, working around the absence of The Movie, was supplemented with a newly produced OVA, Scramble City, before creating entirely new series to continue the storyline which ignored the American series' finale entirely. The extended Japanese run consisted of The Headmasters, Super-God Masterforce, Victory and Zone, then in illustrated magazine form as Battlestars: Return of Convoy and Operation: Combination.

An animated series and toyline complimented Transformers: Generation 2, though the former mostly consisted of repackaged versions of Generation 1 episodes.

In 2009, Shout! Factory released the entire G1 series in a 16-DVD box set called the Matrix of Leadership Edition. They also released the same content as individual seasons.

==== Beast Wars and Beast Machines (1996–2000) ====
Beast Wars was conceived as a reboot of the Transformers mythos following lackluster sales of the preceding Generation 2 line. It was accompanied with a toyline and an animated series, the latter of which won a Daytime Emmy Award.

The story focuses on a small group of Maximals (the new Autobots), led by Optimus Primal, and Predacons, led by Megatron, 300 years after the "Great War". After a dangerous pursuit through transwarp space, both the Maximal and Predacon factions end up crash landing on a primitive, uncivilized planet similar to Earth, but with two moons and a dangerous level of Energon (which is later revealed to be prehistoric Earth with an artificial second moon, taking place sometime during the 4 million year period in which the Autobots and Decepticons were in suspended animation from the first episode of the original Transformers cartoon), which forces them to take organic beast forms in order to function without going into stasis lock. After writing this first episode, Bob Forward and Larry DiTillio learned of the G1 Transformers and began to use elements of it as a historical backstory to their scripts, establishing Beast Wars as a part of the Generation 1 universe through numerous callbacks to both the cartoon and the Marvel comic. By the end of the first season, the second moon and the Energon are revealed to have been constructed by a mysterious alien race known as the Vok.

The plot of the Beast Wars cartoon would end up converging with the original cartoon's. In this screenshot from "The Agenda", Beast Wars Megatron attacks G1 Optimus Prime.

During the second season, the destruction of the second moon releases mysterious energies that turn some of the characters into "Transmetals". Also in the season, the planet is revealed to be prehistoric Earth, leading to the discovery of the Ark. Megatron attempts to kill the original Optimus Prime, but at the beginning of the third season, Primal manages to preserve his spark. The series culminates with Megatron's ultimate plan to use the original Decepticon ship, the Nemesis, to destroy Earth and the Maximals in a decisive blow. In the two-season follow-up series, Beast Machines, Cybertron is revealed to have organic origins, which Megatron attempts to stamp out.

After the first season of Beast Wars (comprising 26 episodes) aired in Japan, the Japanese were faced with a problem. The second Canadian season was only 13 episodes long, not enough to warrant airing on Japanese TV. While they waited for the third Canadian season to be completed (thereby making 26 episodes in total when added to season 2), they produced two exclusive cel-animated series of their own, Beast Wars II (also called Beast Wars Second) and Beast Wars Neo, to fill in the gap. Dreamwave retroactively revealed Beast Wars to be the future of their G1 universe, and the 2006 IDW comic book Beast Wars: The Gathering eventually confirmed the Japanese series to be canon within a story set during Season 3.

Beast Wars contained elements from both the G1 cartoon series and comics. In addition to the aforementioned appearance of the original Optimus Prime, attributes taken from the cartoon include Transformers that were female, the appearance of Starscream (who mentions being killed off by Galvatron in The Transformers: The Movie), and appearances of the Plasma Energy Chamber and Key to Vector Sigma. The naming of the Transformer ship, the Ark (and reference to 1984, the year the Transformers on board are revived), the character Ravage being shown as intelligent, and Cybertron having an organic core are elements taken from the comics.

In 2011, Shout! Factory released the complete series of Beast Wars on DVD.

==== Robots in Disguise (2000–2001) ====
First broadcast in Japan in 2000 as Car Robots, Robots in Disguise was a single animated series consisting of thirty-nine episodes. It was exported to other countries in subsequent years. In this continuity, Megatron re-creates the Decepticons as a sub-faction of the Predacons on Earth, a potential reference to the return to the vehicle-based characters following the previous dominance of the animal-based characters of the Beast eras. While Car Robots was positioned as a direct continuation of the original series, Robots in Disguise is a stand-alone universe with no ties to any other Transformers fiction, though some of the characters from Robots in Disguise did eventually make appearances in Transformers: Universe, including Optimus Prime, Ultra Magnus, Side Burn and Prowl.

The show was heavily censored in the U.S. due to its content of buildings being destroyed and terrorism references after the September 11 attacks on the United States and three episodes were cut altogether.

==== The Unicron Trilogy (2002–2006) ====
These three lines, launched in 2002 and dubbed the "Unicron Trilogy" by Transformers designer Aaron Archer, are co-productions between Takara and (lesser extent) Hasbro, simultaneously released in both countries, each lasting 52 episodes. Armada followed the Autobots and Decepticons, discovering the powerful Mini-Cons on Earth, which are revealed by the end to be weapons of Unicron. Energon, set ten years later, followed the Autobots and the Omnicons in their fight to stop the Decepticons and the Terrorcons from resurrecting Unicron with energon.

In Japan, the series Transformers: Cybertron showed no ties to the previous two series, telling its own story. This caused continuity problems when Hasbro sold Cybertron as a follow-up to Armada/Energon. The writers attempted to change certain plot elements from the Japanese version to remedy this, although this largely added up to nothing more than references to Unicron, Primus, Primes and Minicons.

Just as Marvel produced a companion comic to Generation 1, Dreamwave Productions published the comic Transformers Armada set in a different continuity from the cartoon. At #19, it became Transformers Energon. Dreamwave went bankrupt and ceased all publications before the storyline could be completed at #30. However, the Transformers Fan Club published a few stories set in the Cybertron era.

==== Transformers: Animated (2007–2009) ====
Transformers: Animated is a cartoon that first aired in early 2008 on Cartoon Network in the United States. Originally scheduled for late after 2007 under the title of Transformers: Heroes, Transformers Animated is set in 2050 Detroit (after crash landing 50 years earlier), when robots and humans live side by side. The Autobots come to Earth and assume superhero roles, battling evil humans, with the Decepticons having a smaller role until Megatron resurfaces. Main characters include Autobots Optimus Prime, Bumblebee, Bulkhead, Prowl, and Ratchet; Decepticons Megatron, Starscream, Blitzwing, Lugnut, and Blackarachnia; and humans Professor Sumdac and Sari Sumdac. Several characters that were in the original Transformers cartoon and 1986 animated movie, as well as characters only seen in comics and such, make special appearances and cameos throughout the show, with various voice actors (including Corey Burton, John Moschitta, Jr., Susan Blu, and Judd Nelson) reprising their roles.

==== Aligned Universe (2010–2021) ====
Hasbro, in an attempt to stop the wave of reboots that started in 2001, created the Aligned Universe, with the intent to unify every Transformers media into one continuity. The name of this continuity however, is not official; it was adopted by the fans after Hasbro referred to it as an "Aligned Continuity".

The toy lines derived from this continuity are Transformers: Generations, Transformers: Rescue Bots, and Transformers Go!, with Generations housing both the Prime and Transformers: Robots in Disguise. The television series belonging to the Aligned Universe include Transformers: Prime (including its concluding film Prime Beast Hunters: Predacons Rising), the Rescue Bots TV series, its sequel Transformers: Rescue Bots Academy, the Go! anime adaptation, and the 2015 series Robots in Disguise.

The video games that are part of this shared universe are Transformers: War for Cybertron (including its Nintendo DS version and the companion Transformers: Cybertron Adventures), Transformers: Fall of Cybertron, the Prime video game adaptation, and Transformers: Rise of the Dark Spark, which serves as a conclusion of the Cybertron series and a crossover with the then-recently released Age of Extinction.

Four novels set within the continuity have been published: Transformers: Exodus, Transformers: Exiles, Transformers: Retribution, and Transformers: The Covenant of Primus. The first three were published by Del Rey Books, while Covenant of Primus was published by 47North. In addition, IDW Publishing has published several comic books, including graphic novels, while Titan Magazines published Transformers Comic UK, a 20-issue series from 2007 to 2014.

Despite the acclaim some works in the Aligned continuity received, the video games, novels, and television series ended up contradicting each other due to creative differences, miscommunications, constant team changes, and Aaron Archer being replaced with a different person that did not know the 354-page brand bible, "The Binder of Revelation".

=== Transformers: Cyberverse (2018–2021) ===
Transformers: Cyberverse (later known as Transformers: Bumblebee Cyberverse Adventures for seasons 3 and 4) is an animated series produced by Boulder Media and Allspark Animation (later Entertainment One) which premiered on September 1, 2018 on Cartoon Network and concluded on November 21, 2021 on Netflix comprising four chapters, of which the fourth was composed of two specials. Cyberverse uses characters and elements across various continuities, including G1, Beast Era, the live-action film series, Animated, and the Aligned continuity, to tell its own story.

=== Transformers: EarthSpark (2022–2025) ===
Transformers: EarthSpark is an animated television series produced by Entertainment One and Nickelodeon Animation Studio for the streaming service Paramount+ and the television network Nickelodeon, which debuted on November 11, 2022. EarthSpark is notable for prominently featuring humans after being mostly absent in various media of the franchise in the late 2010s such as Cyberverse, the 2019 IDW comics and War for Cybertron Trilogy, and uses a union voice cast for the first time since 2018.

=== Streaming television series ===
==== Transformers: Prime Wars Trilogy (2016–2018) ====
In August 2016, Machinima and Hasbro co-produced an animated series named Combiner Wars, simultaneously published on the website Go90 and YouTube. This was followed by two further installments, Titans Return and Power of the Primes. These three animated series are named after, and accompany, their respective toylines. Eric Calderon was executive producer of the trilogy. The events of the series take place 40 years after the end of the Autobot/Decepticon civil war, with the Transformers having returned to Cybertron and now being threatened by ancient technology.

The trailer for Combiner Wars was released on July 26, 2016, along with four prequel episodes. Eight five-minute episodes of the series Combiner Wars were released weekly beginning on August 2. The cast of the Combiner Wars was predominantly made up of famous YouTube personalities. The first series was included as a bonus feature on the Transformers: The Last Knight Blu-ray release.

The second series, dubbed Titans Return featured returning voice cast from previous iterations of Transformers, such as Peter Cullen and Judd Nelson, along with newcomers such as Michael Dorn as Fortress Maximus and Wil Wheaton as Perceptor. Guest voices included Mark Hamill and Ron Perlman. Titans Return debuted on November 14, 2017, on the Go90 platform, consisting of ten episodes at roughly 11 minutes each. The series featured returning Titan characters such as Metroplex, Fortress Maximus and Trypticon and the resultant destruction such enormous characters create.

The third part of the trilogy, dubbed Power of the Primes was launched on May 1, 2018, comprising 10 episodes released weekly, each roughly 11 minutes long. FJ DeSanto was executive producer of the third installment. Animation was done by Tatsunoko Productions. Power of the Primes focused on the arrival of Megatronus, one of the original Primes.

In 2019, Machinima shut down and folded into Otter Media. On January 19, Machinima removed all of its videos from YouTube, including those of the Prime Wars Trilogy. After the shutdown, a number of former Machinima creations returned to the web via Rooster Teeth. The series is available on the Rooster Teeth website.

==== Transformers: War for Cybertron Trilogy (2020–2021) ====
The Transformers: War for Cybertron Trilogy is an animated three-part series that was developed as a co-production between Rooster Teeth, Netflix and Hasbro. Polygon Pictures was chosen as the animation studio. Headed by FJ DeSanto, a veteran of Transformers animation, having previously worked on two installments of the Power of the Primes trilogy, the series once again accompanies the respective toylines and tells the origin of the civil war between the Autobots and Decepticons. Comprising three parts, the series was announced on February 15, 2019, for release on Netflix. The voice cast of the show used new actors for recognizable characters such as Jake Foushou as Optimus Prime and Jason Marnocha as Megatron. Each series is made up of six episodes, each a half hour long. The series also had a tie-in toyline.

A trailer of for the first installment, Siege was released on July 8, 2020, with the show following on July 30, 2020, The first series focuses on the civil war on Cybertron and the conflict between the two leaders of the opposing factions, Optimus Prime and Megatron, along with the introduction of a third, mercenary, faction.

A trailer for the second series, dubbed Earthrise, was published on December 7, 2020 The second series debuted on Netflix on December 30. Earthrise was more limited in scope than the previous series. Instead of the entire Transformer civil war, this series focuses on the two leaders once again and the crews of their starships as Optimus seeks to flee Cybertron and find the missing Allspark. The series also saw the introduction of a fourth faction, the Quintessons.

The trailer for the final series, Kingdom, debuted on July 5, 2021 and the series premiered on Netflix on July 29. Kingdom picks up where the last series leaves off with Optimus and Megatron searching for the Allspark, having now crash-landed on Earth. On the planet, they encounter characters previously seen in the older series Transformers: Beast Wars.

==== Transformers: BotBots (2022) ====
Transformers: BotBots is an animated comedy streaming television series developed by Kevin Burke and Chris "Doc" Wyatt for Netflix comprising 20 episodes. The first season of ten episodes was released on March 25, 2022. In a departure from the traditional conflict between the Autobots and Decepticons seen in most continuities, the series focuses on the BotBots, small robots organized in groups of tribes who can transform into everyday objects, and primarily follows the efforts of the Lost Bots, who try to find their own place amongst the others.

==== Transformers: Cyberworld (2025–present) ====
Transformers: Cyberworld is an ongoing British-American animated web series. Once again, it is set in a new continuity. It is produced by Omens Studios and Hasbro Entertainment, and debuted on July 12, 2025 on YouTube.

=== Comics ===
==== Marvel comics (1984-1995) ====
Spider-Man battles Megatron on the cover of The Transformers #3.

The Marvel comic was originally part of the main Marvel Universe, with appearances from Spider-Man and Nick Fury, plus some cameos. as well as a visit to the Savage Land. The TV series contradicted Budiansky's backstories. The TV series shows the Autobots looking for new energy sources, and crash landing as the Decepticons attack. Marvel interpreted the Autobots as destroying a rogue asteroid approaching Cybertron. Shockwave is loyal to Megatron on the TV series, keeping Cybertron in a stalemate during his absence, but in the comic book, he attempts to take command of the Decepticons. The TV series would also differ wildly from the origins Budiansky had created for the Dinobots, the Decepticon turned Autobot Jetfire (known as Skyfire on TV), the Constructicons (who combine to form Devastator), and Omega Supreme. The Marvel comic establishes early on that Prime wields the Creation Matrix, which gives life to machines; however, the cartoon episode "The Key to Vector Sigma" introduces the titular computer, which serves the same purpose. The Matrix proper would be introduced into the cartoon in The Movie.

Just as the TV series was wrapping up, Marvel continued to expand its continuity. It follows The Movie's example by killing Prime and Megatron, albeit in the present day. Dinobot leader Grimlock takes over as Autobot leader. There was a G.I. Joe crossover and the limited series The Transformers: Headmasters, which further expanded the scope to the planet Nebulon. It led on to the main title resurrecting Prime as a Powermaster. With the television series concluded, the introduction of new toys for the 1988 season facilitated the need to kill multiple established characters in the Marvel comics; to do so, Starscream obtained unlimited power through a mysterious force called the Underbase and wiped out numerous Autobots and Decepticons using it.

In the United Kingdom, the mythology continued to grow. Concurrently with The Movie's release, the British Marvel comic, penned at the time by Simon Furman, jumped to the movie's future timeline, which had facilitated the introduction of new content to keep up with reprints from the American comics. Primus is introduced as the creator of the Transformers, to serve his material body that is planet Cybertron and fight his nemesis Unicron. Female Autobot Arcee also appeared, despite the comic book stating the Transformers had no concept of gender, with her backstory of being built by the Autobots to quell human accusations of sexism. Soundwave, Megatron's second-in-command, also breaks the fourth wall in the letters page, criticising the cartoon continuity as an inaccurate representation of history. The UK also had a crossover in Action Force, the UK counterpart to G.I. Joe. The comic book features a resurrected Megatron, whom Furman retconned to be a clone when he took over the U.S. comic book, which depicted Megatron as still dead. The U.S. comic would last for 80 issues until 1991, and the UK comic lasted 332 issues and several annuals, until it was replaced as Dreamwave Productions, later in the 20th century.

It was five issues of the G.I. Joe comic in 1993 that would springboard a return for Marvel's Transformers, with the new twelve-issue series Transformers: Generation 2, to market a new toy line.

This story reveals that the Transformers originally breed asexually, though it is stopped by Primus because it produced the evil Swarm. A new empire, neither Autobot nor Decepticon, is bringing it back, however. Though the year-long arc wrapped itself up with an alliance between Optimus Prime and Megatron, the final panel introduces the Liege Maximo, ancestor of the Decepticons. This minor cliffhanger was not resolved until 2001 and 2002's Transforce convention when writer Simon Furman concluded his story in the exclusive novella Alignment.

==== Dreamwave Productions (2001–2005) ====
In 2001, Dreamwave Productions began a new universe of annual comics adapted from Marvel but also included elements of the animated series. The Dreamwave stories followed the concept of the Autobots defeating the Decepticons on Earth, but their 1997 return journey to Cybertron on the Ark II is destroyed by Shockwave, now ruler of the planet. The story follows on from there and was told in two six-issue limited series, then a ten-issue ongoing series. The series also adds extra complexities such as not all Transformers believing in the existence of Primus, corruption in the Cybertronian government that first led Megatron to begin his war, and Earth having an unknown relevance to Cybertron.

Three Transformers: The War Within limited series were also published. These are set at the beginning of the Great War, and identify Prime as once being a clerk named Optronix. Beast Wars was also retroactively stated as the future of this continuity, with the profile series More than Meets the Eye showing the Predacon Megatron looking at historical files detailing Dreamwave's characters and taking his name from the original Megatron. In 2004, this real life universe also inspired three novels and a Dorling Kindersley guide, which focused on Dreamwave as the "true" continuity when discussing in-universe elements of the characters. In a new twist, Primus and Unicron are siblings, formerly a being known as the One. Transformers: Micromasters, set after the Ark's disappearance, was also published. The real life universe was disrupted when Dreamwave went bankrupt in 2005. This left the Generation 1 story hanging and the third volume of The War Within half finished. Plans for a comic book set between Beast Wars and Beast Machines were also left unrealized.

==== G.I. Joe crossovers (2003–present) ====
Throughout the years, the G1 characters have also starred in crossovers with fellow Hasbro property G.I. Joe, but whereas those crossovers published by Marvel were in continuity with their larger storyline, those released by Dreamwave and G.I. Joe publisher Devil's Due Publishing occupy their own separate real life universes. In Devil's Due, the terrorist organization COBRA Command is responsible for finding and reactivating the Transformers. Dreamwave's version reimagines the familiar G1 and G.I. Joe characters in a World War II setting, and a second limited series was released set in the present day, though Dreamwave's bankruptcy meant it was cancelled after a single issue. Devil's Due had Cobra re-engineer the Transformers to turn into familiar Cobra vehicles, and released further mini-series that sent the characters travelling through time, battling Serpentor and being faced with the combined menace of Cobra-La and Unicron. During this time, Cobra teams up with the Decepticons. IDW Publishing has expressed interest in their own crossover.

In recent fiction, the Transformers: Rise of the Beasts film features a crossover with G.1. Joe, with the film's main character Noah Diaz being recruited into the team. Skybound Entertainment's Energon Universe features characters from G.I. Joe forming the G.I. Joe Team and Cobra in response to the Transformers' arrival on Earth.

==== IDW Publishing (2005–2022) ====
The following year, IDW Publishing rebooted the G1 series from scratch within various limited series and one shots. This allowed long-time writer of Marvel and Dreamwave comics, Simon Furman, to create his own universe without continuity hindrance, similar to Ultimate Marvel. This new continuity originally consisted of a comic book series titled The Transformers with a companion series known as The Transformers: Spotlight. The main series was broken up into several story arcs. Eventually, with IDW Publishing losing sales, the series was given a soft reboot. Beginning with All Hail Megatron, the series was set in a new direction, discarding the miniseries and Spotlight format with ongoing comics. By 2012 the series had split into three ongoing series; The Transformers: More Than Meets The Eye, The Transformers: Robots in Disguise (which later changed in 2015 to "The Transformers") and The Transformers: Till All Are One. The original series concluded in 2018 and was rebooted the following year. In 2022, it was announced that IDW lost the publishing rights to Transformers.

==== Skybound Entertainment (2023-present) ====
Following a cameo from Jetfire in the debut issue of Void Rivals, Skybound Entertainment and Image Comics began publishing a rebooted series in 2023. As with previous comics before it, Skybound's interpretion of the Transformers mythos draws from Generation 1 depictions of it and is presented as a darker, more grittier take on the story that is tied into a larger, shared universe with other Hasbro intellectual properties.

==== Alternative stories ====
In January 2006, the Hasbro Transformers Collectors' Club comic wrote a story based on the Transformers Classics toy line, set in the Marvel Comics universe, but excluding the Generation 2 comic. Fifteen years after Megatron crash-lands in the Ark with Ratchet, the war continues with the characters in their Classics bodies.

IDW Publishing introduced The Transformers: Evolutions in 2006, a collection of mini-series that re-imagine and reinterpret the G1 characters in various ways. To date, only one miniseries has been published, Hearts of Steel, placing the characters in an Industrial Revolution-era setting. The series was delayed as Hasbro did not want to confuse newcomers with too many fictional universes before the release of the live-action film.

However, IDW and the original publisher Marvel Comics announced a crossover storyline with the Avengers to coincide with the film, titled New Avengers/Transformers. The story is set on the borders of Symkaria and Latveria, and its fictional universe is set between the first two New Avengers storylines, as well in between the Infiltration and Escalation phase of IDW's The Transformers. IDW editor-in-chief Chris Ryall hinted at elements of it being carried over into the main continuities, and that a sequel is possible. In June 2018 it was announced there would be Star Trek and Transformers Crossover being released in September 2018.

==== Transformers: Kiss Players (2006–2007) ====
Transformers: Kiss Players (トランスフォーマー キスぷれ, Toransufōmā Kisu Pure), shortened to Kiss Players (キスぷれ, Kisu Pure), is a Japanese Transformers franchise which ran from 2006 to 2007. It was helmed by artist and writer Yuki Ohshima. By virtue of being the only Transformers toyline and fiction released in Japan by Takara between the conclusion of Transformers: Cybertron and the live-action movie, it was also effectively the main Transformers line in the country for that time. It takes place in the Japanese Generation 1 cartoon continuity, specifically in the five-year milieu between The Transformers: The Movie and Transformers 2010. The franchise itself consists of a toyline, a weekly radio drama series (featuring voice acting by Lyrian as Marissa, Yui Kano as Shaoshao, Satomi Akesaka as Atari, and Keiji Hirai as Ne-04, among others), and a three-part manga, which together tell the story of the line in which the toys and manga all of which were also created by Ohshima. The accompanying toyline ran concurrently with the Alternators/Binaltech line, with the characters transforming into licensed cars like the Mazda RX-8.

Kiss Players revolves around a group of human girls who possess the ability to enhance Transformer powers by kissing them, allowing them to fuse with the robots and share their adventures. The overall plot appears to be a continuation of the original Generation 1 story that takes place following the animated movie. Following the arrival of Galvatron and subsequent destruction of Tokyo, the Earth Defense Command, a recurring organization that appears in Transformers media, turned against all Transformers and created a team of human-made transforming robots known as Autoroopers (オートルーパー Ōtorūpā), a Japanese portmanteau of "auto" (オート ōto) and "trooper" (トルーパー torūpā) or Autotroopers (aka Autobot Troopers). Autoroopers were deployed to fight other Transformers, harnessing the power of young women with Kiss Player abilities who were infected by Unicron-mutated cells to partner with them. A younger version of Marissa Faireborn led an Autobot resistance alongside a resurrected Optimus Prime and the former Rodimus Prime, who stepped down as leader following the destruction of Tokyo, became Hot Rod once again, and partnered with Shaoshao Li, Marissa's estranged friend who is of Chinese descent. Following the death of her parents in an accident that left her the sole survivor, Japanese girl Atari Hitonari joined the EDC and eventually met an Autorooper, Ne-04, who bonded with her over their shared survivor's guilt.

Following the conclusion of its first storyline in late 2007, Kiss Players moved into its second (and apparently final) phase, Kiss Players Position, which shifted focus to a distinctly more PG-rated theme, though it was still heavy on the "cute girls" theme. The Kiss Players this time are a pop idol singing group made up of the three girls and three original mini-cassette Transformers Glit, Sundor, and Rosanna; Glit is a spy, Sundor shows compassion to both allies and enemies, and Rosanna is the only heroic one out of the three. The group's purpose is to promote a positive relationship and friendship between humans and Transformers in the wake of the Tokyo disaster of 2005 and the subsequent rise and fall of the E.D.C.. They wear E.D.C. logos on their costumes as a group, appearing to be either sponsored by or a public-relations arm of the revitalized organization. While this plotline seems like a shift in demographics to little girls, it is said that this line was aimed at a much older adult male audience. The toys bear an "ages 15 and up" warning, and the subject matter of the accompanying manga is far from child-friendly.

Ohshima's other major contribution to Transformers at the time, the 1-page Information Administration Teletraan 15 Go! Go! comic published in Dengeki Hobby magazine, also featured several tie-ins to the Kiss Players story. These primarily served to introduce readers to the Kiss Players story and characters when the line was launched, and then later, to summarize the final few radio dramas when both series were drawing to a close. Information Administration Teletraan 15 Go! Go! also featured the first part of a story in which Starscream's ghost possessed Atari (which was continued in the radio drama), and in the second year, notably incorporated the further adventures of the Kiss Players Position cassette trio, who were rather confusingly dropped from the radio storyline in its second week and never mentioned again.

Reactions ran the gamut from outright disgust to comedic derision, with most fans agreeing that such content being included in a children's toyline was distasteful. The fact that several Japanese fans were themselves openly decrying Kiss Players, fearing that American fans would think that it was somehow accepted as normal in Japan regarding its sexually suggestive material. Oshima himself even admitted that he crafted the series in this manner for shock value's sake.

Many of its characters and ideas have made appearances in other Transformers media. The Autoroopers appeared in Transformers: Animated in 2009 with an official toyline released at Botcon 2011. The Mini-Cassettes that appear in Kiss Players saw a modern release with a Jem and the Holograms-inspired Blaster. The colors of white and blue used for Glit would inspire the Shattered Glass incarnation of Ravage. A new toy figure of Sundor would be released under the Transformers Generations: The Fall of Cybertron line in 2012. Several ideas introduced into the 2007 storyline focusing on the introduction of Primus into the Japanese cartoon's timeline have been revisited and expanded upon, which shares Kiss Players storytelling while attempting to fill in gaps of the timeline in the Japanese Generation 1 cartoon continuity. The Transformers Legends manga, while featuring lewd content and new stories and characters, also has the two returning and older characters of Atari and Shaoshao.

==== Transformers: Universe (2003–2025) ====
The storyline of Transformers: Universe, mainly set following Beast Machines, sees characters from many assorted alternate continuities, including existing and new ones, encountering each other. The story was told in an unfinished comic book exclusive to the Official Transformers Collectors' Convention.

=== Films ===
==== Live-action film franchise (2007–present) ====
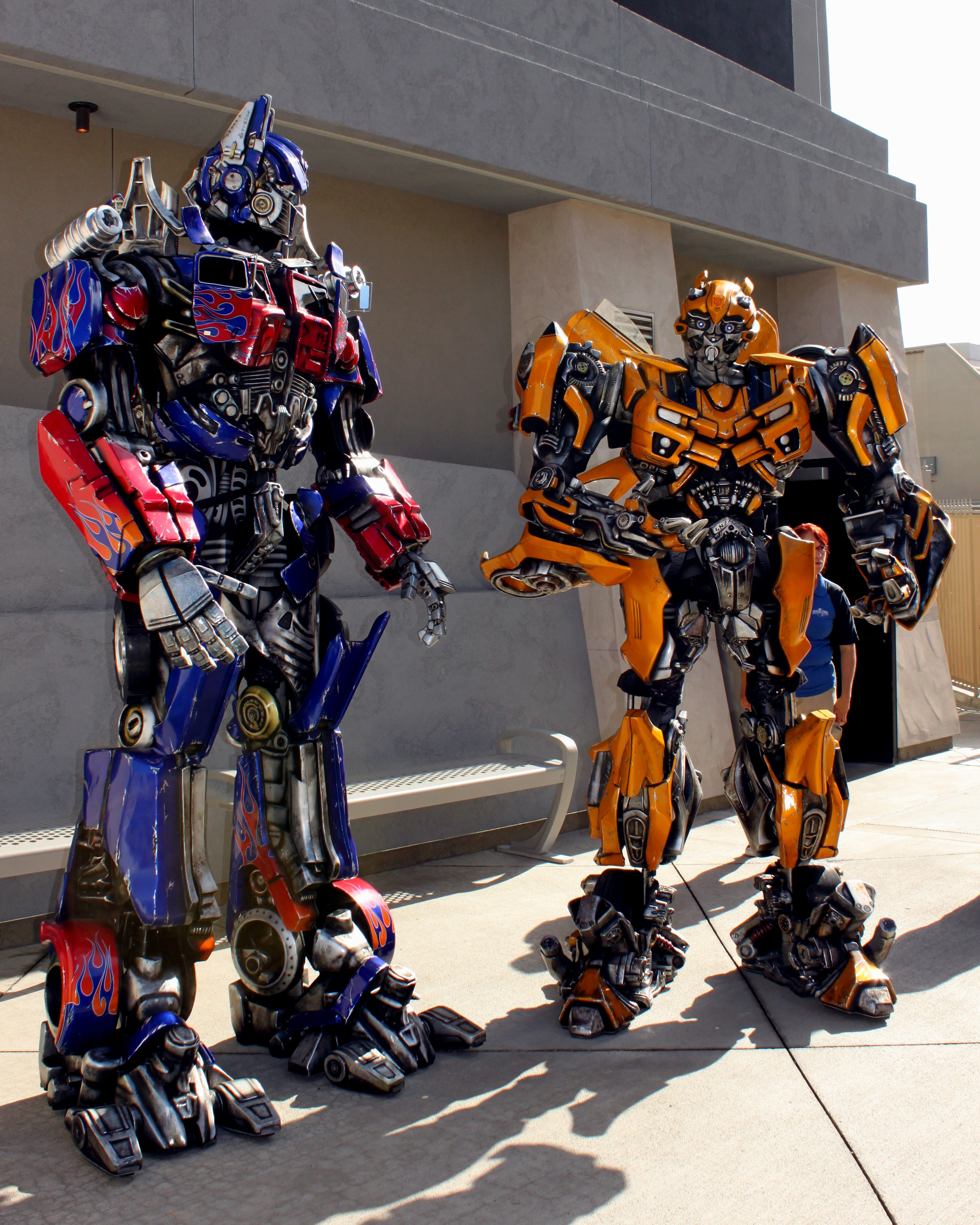
Costume characters at Universal Studio Hollywood

In 2007, Michael Bay directed a live-action film based on Transformers, with Steven Spielberg serving as executive producer. It stars Shia LaBeouf, Josh Duhamel, Megan Fox, and Tyrese Gibson in the lead human cast while voice actors Peter Cullen and Hugo Weaving voice Optimus Prime and Megatron, respectively. Transformers received mixed to positive reviews and was a box office success. It is the forty-fifth highest-grossing film and the fifth highest-grossing film of 2007, grossing approximately $709 million worldwide. The film won four awards from the Visual Effects Society and was nominated for three Academy Awards, for Best Sound Editing, Best Sound Mixing, and Best Visual Effects. The performance of Shia LaBeouf was praised by Empire, and Peter Cullen's reprisal of Optimus Prime from the 1980s television series was well received by fans. A sequel, Transformers: Revenge of the Fallen, was released on June 24, 2009. It received mostly negative reviews, but was a commercial success and grossed more than its predecessor. A third film, Transformers: Dark of the Moon, was released on June 29, 2011, in 3-D and went on to gross over $1 billion, despite receiving mixed reviews. A fourth film, Transformers: Age of Extinction, was released on June 27, 2014, which also grossed over $1 billion and was the highest-grossing film of 2014, though it received generally negative reviews. A fifth film, Transformers: The Last Knight, was released on June 21, 2017 to similarly negative reviews. Unlike its predecessors, the movie failed to recoup its costs for the studio. After a sequel idea involving sister Hasbro IP G.I. Joe went unproduced, Bay was set to return for a sequel as director, as with Spielberg as lead creative producer.

Bumblebee, directed by Laika's Travis Knight, was released on December 21, 2018, serving as a prequel to the first film, receiving positive reviews from critics. The movie was a box-office success. A sequel to Bumblebee, directed by Steven Caple Jr. and titled Transformers: Rise of the Beasts, was released on June 9, 2023 to mixed reviews from critics.

==== Transformers One (2024) ====
Upon the establishment of a writers' room for devising ideas regarding future Transformers films in 2015, the duo of Andrew Barrer and Gabriel Ferrari immediately conceived the concept of an animated prequel film depicting the beginnings of the Autobot-Decepticon war on Cybertron. The film is directed by Josh Cooley, who oversaw the story treatment by Barrer and Ferrari with additional script contributions by Eric Pearson. The film's narrative is centered on the respective origin stories of Optimus Prime and Megatron, chroncling their early friendship as Energon miners named Orion Pax and D-16, and the rift that causes their evolution into the respective leaders of the Autobots and Decepticons, beginning their long-standing conflict. Chris Hemsworth and Brian Tyree Henry lead the film's ensemble voice cast as Orion Pax and D-16 respectively, alongside Scarlett Johansson, Keegan-Michael Key, Jon Hamm and Laurence Fishburne. The film's score was composed by Brian Tyler, returning to the franchise after previously scoring Transformers: Prime. Transformers One released in September 2024, and received positive critical reception despite financially underperforming at the box office, grossing $124.2 million worldwide against a budget estimated to be between $75–147 million. Despite this, producer Lorenzo di Bonaventura expressed the desire for the film to launch a potential trilogy, confirming that the story was mapped out to illustrate a multi-film progression of the characters towards their traditional depictions in other media, such as the live-action films. By the film's release, di Bonaventura confirmed that the filmmakers were already outlining plans for a sequel, and that it would be produced if the film is considered successful.

==== Optimus Prime: Awakening (2026) ====
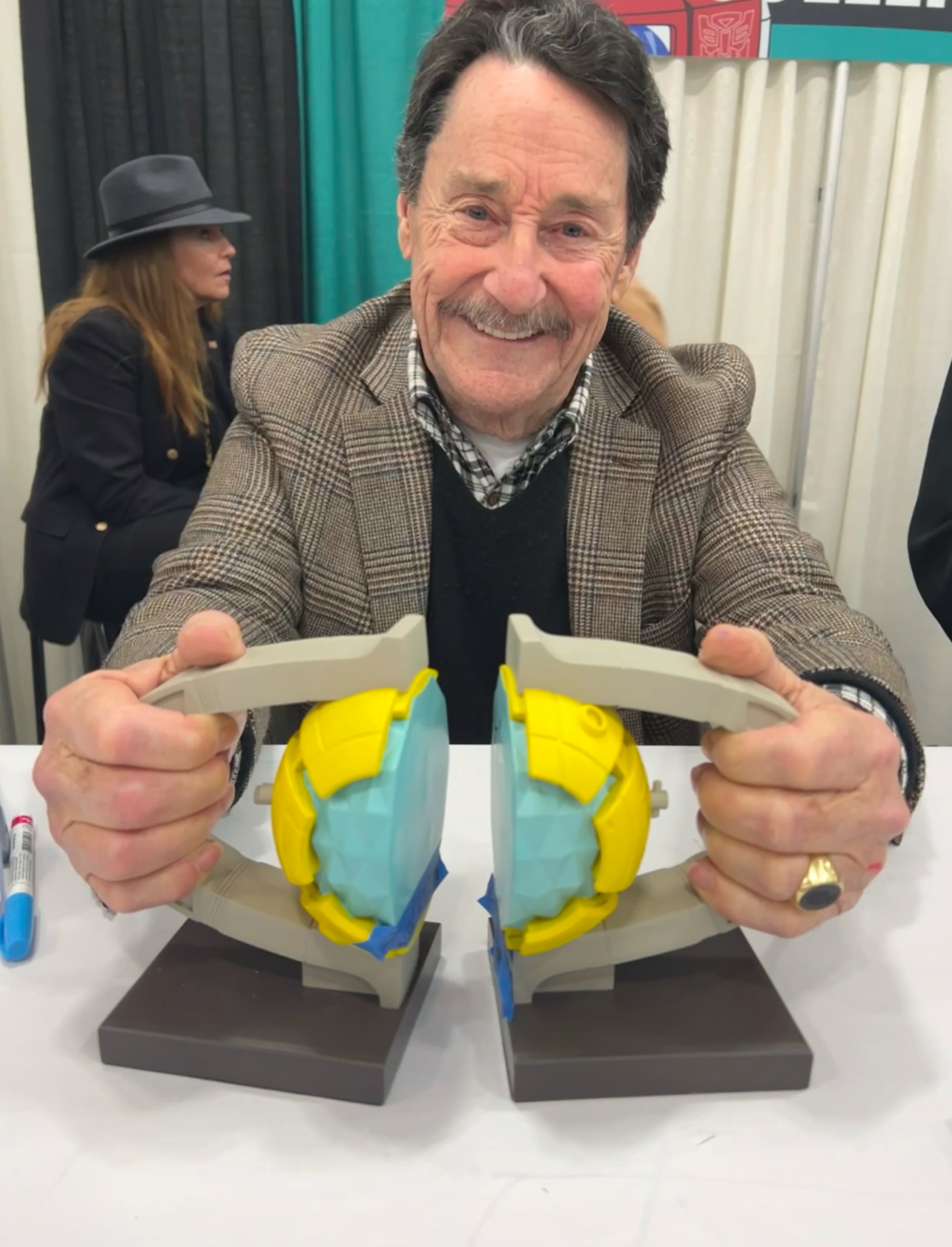
Optimus Prime: Awakening marked the final role of Peter Cullen, Optimus Prime's original voice actor.

In 2026, Fathom Entertainment revealed that they would rerelease The Transformers: The Movie for its 40th anniversary. Screenings, labeled The Apology Tour, would be paired with a post-credits short film. On August 26, 2026, original Optimus Prime voice actor Peter Cullen passed away. Shortly afterward, Fathom revealed further details; Cullen had indeed recorded lines for the short, marking his last performance as Optimus and his last voice role overall. Cullen would be joined by Frank Welker, who played Megatron and Soundwave. The short is dedicated to Cullen's memory. Dan Gilvezan criticized Bumblebee voice actor Jarret LeMaster's role in the short, having been recast due to the fact LeMaster was friends with director Josh Wassung.

== See also ==
- G.I. Joe
- GoBots
- Voltron
- Macross
- Brave series
- Gundam
- List of space science fiction franchises
