= Jetfire =

Transformers characters

- Transformers character
- Jetfire's generation 1 design
- First appearance: "Fire in the Sky"
- Based on: VF-1 Valkyrie by Shōji Kawamori
- Voiced by: Gregg Berger, Osamu Saka, Mark Ryan, others

In-universe information
- Affiliation: Autobots (ex-Decepticon)

Jetfire, also called Skyfire, is a fictional character from the Transformers franchise. He is an Autobot with flight capabilities and a jet as an alternate mode. In some continuities, he is a former Decepticon. His original toy design was a repackaged version of the VF-1 Valkyrie mech from the Macross anime franchise, which has resulted in legal controversy and litigation surrounding him.

== History ==
Jetfire debuted in generation 1 of the Transformers franchise. While he is referred to by the name Jetfire in the toy line and the comic series published by Marvel Comics, he is called Skyfire in the 1980s cartoon. He is depicted as an Autobot scientist that was once a comrade of the Decepticon Starscream before the Autobots and Decepticons went to war. His debut episode, "Fire in the Sky", depicts him as having been lost in ice for millions of years. Upon reawakening, he learns about the cruelty of the Decepticons and joins the Autobots. In the 1980s cartoon, he is voiced by Gregg Berger in English and by Osamu Saka in Japanese.

After generation 1, Jetfire returned in the Transformers: Armada anime. In this series, Jetfire has the ability to combine with Optimus Prime to form Jet Convoy. He returned again in Transformers: Animated, this time being a young Autobot with the ability to join with his twin brother Jetstorm into the combined robot Safeguard.

In a USA Today online fan poll following the release of the 2007 live-action Transformers film, Jetfire was one of the top 5 Transformers that the fans wanted to see in the sequel, coming in 4th place with 11% of the votes. Jetfire appears in Transformers: Revenge of the Fallen and transforms into a Lockheed SR-71 Blackbird. This version of the character is characterized as a bearded, cranky, old Transformer with arthritis, and a former Decepticon that became an Autobot. In the film he gives parts of himself to Optimus Prime so that he can fight the Fallen, the film's villain. He is voiced by Mark Ryan in this film. Additionally, the backstory of Megatron in the film series was inspired by Jetfire's backstory in the original cartoon series, with Megatron being trapped on Earth in ice for millions of years like Jetfire.

Jetfire is present in Skybound Entertainment and Image Comics' Energon Universe. First appearing in Void Rivals #1, revealing the series' connection to the Transformers franchise, he was killed in Transformers #1 but later revived by Ratchet. He follows the newly-christened Elita Prime to Cybertron.

=== Legal issues ===
The toy that was adapted into Jetfire was originally produced by Takatoku Toys and was originally a figure of the VF-1 Valkyrie, a mech from the Macross anime franchise. Hasbro purchased the license to release the toy in the US and rebranded it as a Transformers toy. However, the toy was licensed in Japan to Bandai. Because Hasbro co-developed the Transformers series with Takara, Jetfire's animation model was redesigned so as to not resemble the toy upon which it was based. This was to avoid any legal trouble relating to the Macross franchise or Robotech, its American adaptation. The Transformers story bible noted, "JETFIRE has been 'transformed' into SKYFIRE – with a different model – due to legal reasons. Do not use this character unless necessary."

At the 2013 San Diego Comic-Con, Hasbro released a toy of the Skystriker jet from G.I. Joe featuring a design similar to the original Jetfire as part of a crossover toy set called G.I. Joe and the Transformers: The Epic Conclusion. Harmony Gold USA, the distribution company for Robotech, filed a copyright infringement lawsuit against Hasbro in response. Both parties ultimately agreed to dismiss the lawsuit with prejudice. It is not publicly known what agreement Hasbro and Harmony Gold USA came to, although Hasbro released a new toy of Jetfire the next year to celebrate the Transformers franchise's 30th anniversary. A highly-detailed "Masterpiece" toy of Jetfire was released in 2023.

In 1985, a licensed comic series by the Milton Bradley Company published in the Netherlands, France, Germany, and Spain established that Jetfire was the leader of the Autobots instead of Optimus Prime. The exact reason for why Milton Bradley replaced Optimus Prime with Jetfire is not fully known, although it has been speculated that it was because the rights to Takara's Diaclone toys, including Optimus Prime, were owned in Europe by the French toy company Ceji at the time.
