= High Moon Studios =

American video game developer

High Moon Studios, Inc.
- Logo used since 2012
- Formerly: Sammy Entertainment Inc. (2001–2002); Sammy Studios, Inc. (2002–2005)
- Type: Subsidiary
- Industry: Video games
- Founded: April 2001; 25 years ago (as Sammy Entertainment Inc.)
- Headquarters: Carlsbad, California, US
- Key people: Peter Della Penna (president)
- Products: Darkwatch (2005); Transformers series (2010–2012); Deadpool (2013); Destiny series (2014–2017); Call of Duty series (2014–present)
- Number of employees: 155
- Parent: Sammy Corporation (2001–2005); Vivendi Games (2006–2008); Activision (2008–present)
- Website: highmoonstudios.com

High Moon Studios, Inc. (formerly Sammy Entertainment Inc. and Sammy Studios, Inc.) is an American video game developer initially formed in 2001. After nearly a year as an independent studio, the developer was acquired by Vivendi Games in January 2006 and placed under Sierra Entertainment. It is currently owned by Activision. It has developed multiple Transformers video games and assisted in the development of select Call of Duty games, as well as Destiny.

== History ==
High Moon Studios was formed in April 2001 as a division of the Japanese publisher Sammy, first known as Sammy Entertainment and later renamed Sammy Studios the following year, to develop and publish games in America. After Sammy merged with Sega to form Sega Sammy Holdings on October 1, 2004, Sammy discontinued all video game development in America to focus on its Japanese productions, and planned on closing Sammy Studios as part of this. However on March 3, 2005, Sammy Studios was acquired in a management buyout by a group led by president and CEO John Rowe, and renamed High Moon Studios. Turning to game development only, the studio continued development of games from its time as Sammy Studios, including the Western horror shooter Darkwatch. In January 2006, it was announced that Vivendi Universal Games had acquired the studio. After the merger of Vivendi and Activision, High Moon became a subsidiary of Activision.

Following the completion of Deadpool, Activision laid off 40 full-time employees from High Moon Studios that worked on the project. Activision stated "Activision Publishing consistently works to align its costs with its revenues – this is an ongoing process, with the completion of development on Deadpool, we are taking a reduction in staff at High Moon Studios to better align our development talent against our slate."

== Games developed ==
=== Lead developer ===
Year	Title	Platform(s)
2005	Darkwatch	PlayStation 2, Xbox
2008	Robert Ludlum's The Bourne Conspiracy	PlayStation 3, Xbox 360
2010	Transformers: War for Cybertron	PlayStation 3, Windows, Xbox 360
2011	Transformers: Dark of the Moon	PlayStation 3, Xbox 360
2012	Transformers: Fall of Cybertron	PlayStation 3, PlayStation 4, Windows, Xbox 360, Xbox One
2013	Deadpool	PlayStation 3, PlayStation 4, Windows, Xbox 360, Xbox One

=== Support developer ===
Year	Title	Platform(s)
2014	Call of Duty: Advanced Warfare	PlayStation 3, PlayStation 4, Windows, Xbox 360, Xbox One
2014	Destiny	PlayStation 3, PlayStation 4, Xbox 360, Xbox One
2016	Call of Duty: Modern Warfare Remastered	PlayStation 4, Windows, Xbox One
2017	Destiny 2	PlayStation 4, Windows, Xbox One
2017	Call of Duty: WWII	PlayStation 4, Windows, Xbox One
2019	Call of Duty: Modern Warfare	PlayStation 4, Windows, Xbox One
2020	Call of Duty: Black Ops Cold War	PlayStation 4, PlayStation 5, Windows, Xbox One, Xbox Series
2021	Call of Duty: Vanguard	PlayStation 4, PlayStation 5, Windows, Xbox One, Xbox Series
2022	Call of Duty: Modern Warfare 2	PlayStation 4, PlayStation 5, Windows, Xbox One, Xbox Series
2023	Call of Duty: Modern Warfare III	PlayStation 4, PlayStation 5, Windows, Xbox One, Xbox Series
2024	Call of Duty: Black Ops 6	PlayStation 4, PlayStation 5, Windows, Xbox One, Xbox Series
2025	Call of Duty: Black Ops 7	PlayStation 4, PlayStation 5, Windows, Xbox One, Xbox Series
