= Soundwave (Transformers) =

Transformers character

- Transformers character
- Soundwave as drawn by Guido Guidi for Hasbro Heroes Sourcebook
- First appearance: Transformers toyline (1984)
- Based on: Cassette Man by Takara
- Voiced by: Frank Welker, Issei Masamune, others

In-universe information
- Species: Robot (Cybertronian)
- Affiliation: Decepticon
- Origin: Cybertron

Soundwave is a fictional robot character in the Transformers franchise. Throughout most of his incarnations, he is a loyal lieutenant of the Decepticon leader, Megatron. He is also commonly depicted as Megatron's communications officer and has the ability to transform into a cassette deck. His cassette deck form is able to hold his robotic minions, which turn into cassette tapes.

== History ==
The toy that became known as Soundwave was originally a character called Cassette Man from the Japanese Microchange toy line by Takara. The toy can transform from a robot into a small cassette deck, and it can store miniature cassette tapes in its chest. These tapes can also transform into robots. Takara's Microchange toys were imported to the US by Hasbro in 1984 and rebranded as Transformers characters. Cassette Man was renamed to Soundwave and his head design served as the basis for the logo of the villainous Decepticon faction. Soundwave's toy remained one of the most popular Transformers toys, remaining for sale through 1986, one year longer than the other 1984 toys.

Soundwave's original profile description was written by Bob Budiansky. The profile describes Soundwave as the Decepticon communications officer that rose through the ranks by gathering blackmail against his fellow Decepticons. He is described as having control over electrical and radio signals and can read minds by monitoring the electrical impulses in the brains of others. In the 1980s Transformers cartoon, Soundwave is depicted as an espionage specialist that uses his small cassette deck form to covertly spy on targets, and he uses his cassette tape robots as his spies and enforcers. He is deeply loyal to Megatron, the leader of the Decepticons. Soundwave has access to many cassette robots, although his most commonly used ones are named Rumble, Frenzy, Laserbeak, and Ravage. In the 1980s series, Soundwave is voiced by Frank Welker in English and by Issei Masamune in Japanese.

Soundwave did not appear in the 2007 Transformers film, to the disappointment of fans. Following the release of the film, a USA Today online fan poll determined that Soundwave was the most wanted character to appear in the sequel, winning 20% of the vote. According to writer Roberto Orci, Soundwave was planned to be in the film, and had appeared in early drafts of the script, but was ultimately cut because they could not figure out how to incorporate him without making him change size. In 2008, Soundwave was confirmed to be planned for the sequel.

Soundwave appears in the film Transformers: Revenge of the Fallen as a satellite that monitors communications from earth's orbit. His minion Ravage is depicted as a missile that Soundwave launches down to Earth. He returns in Transformers: Dark of the Moon, this time having come down to Earth with his minion Laserbeak, and transforms into a Mercedes-Benz SLS AMG car. He briefly appears alongside Ravage once again in the reboot film Bumblebee, this time more closely resembling his original cartoon depiction. Soundwave, voiced by Jon Bailey, appears in the animated film Transformers One.

Because cassette decks are no longer widely used, Soundwave has appeared with various alternate modes in different Transformers media. These have included trucks, boomboxes, jets, and stealth bombers.
