= Optimus Prime =

Transformers character

- Art depicting his original toy design
- First appearance: The Transformers; (1984)
- Based on: Battle Convoy by Takara
- Voiced by: Japanese: Tesshō Genda (Gen. 1; films); Satoshi Hashimoto (Robots in Disguise); Toru Okawa (Armada); Katsuyuki Konishi (Energon); Taiten Kusunoki (Cybertron); Hiroki Takahashi (Animated); Takehito Koyasu (Cyberverse); Yuichi Nakamura (One); English: Peter Cullen (Gen. 1; films; Awakening); Pierre Tremblay (Headmasters); Neil Kaplan (Robots in Disguise); Garry Chalk (Armada–Cybertron); David Kaye (Animated); Jon Bailey (Combiner Wars); Jake Tillman Foushee (Cyberverse); Jake Hart (Rescue Bots Academy); Alan Tudyk (Earthspark); Chris Hemsworth (One)

In-universe information
- Position: Commander
- Affiliation: Autobot

Optimus Prime, also known in Japan as Convoy (コンボイ), is a fictional character in Hasbro's Transformers franchise. Generally depicted as a brave and noble leader, Optimus Prime is the supreme commander of the Autobots in their war against the Decepticons. In the Transformers mythology, Optimus Prime is a Cybertronian, a member of an extraterrestrial species of sentient shapeshifting robots.

Optimus was based on a Japanese toy from the Diaclone toyline, and was developed for the American market after Hasbro representatives visited the 1983 Tokyo Toy Show. He is regarded as a part of popular culture and one of the most recognisable fictional characters.

== History and conception ==
Optimus Prime is based on "Battle Convoy", a transforming toy truck from the Japanese Diaclone line of toys created by Takara. Hasbro representatives visited the 1983 Tokyo Toy Show and bought the licenses for multiple Takara toys in order to sell them in the US under the Transformers brand. The original version of the toy included a human pilot, but this was removed for the Transformers version. The name "Optimus Prime" was created by Dennis O'Neil for the Transformers comic by Marvel Comics.

Optimus Prime's truck form is said to be based on the 1980 Freightliner FL86 semi-truck. The trailer carried by the toy in truck mode is able transform into a combat deck, and within the trailer is a small scout robot named Roller. In the 1980s animated series The Transformers, Optimus is voiced by Peter Cullen in English and Tesshō Genda in Japanese.

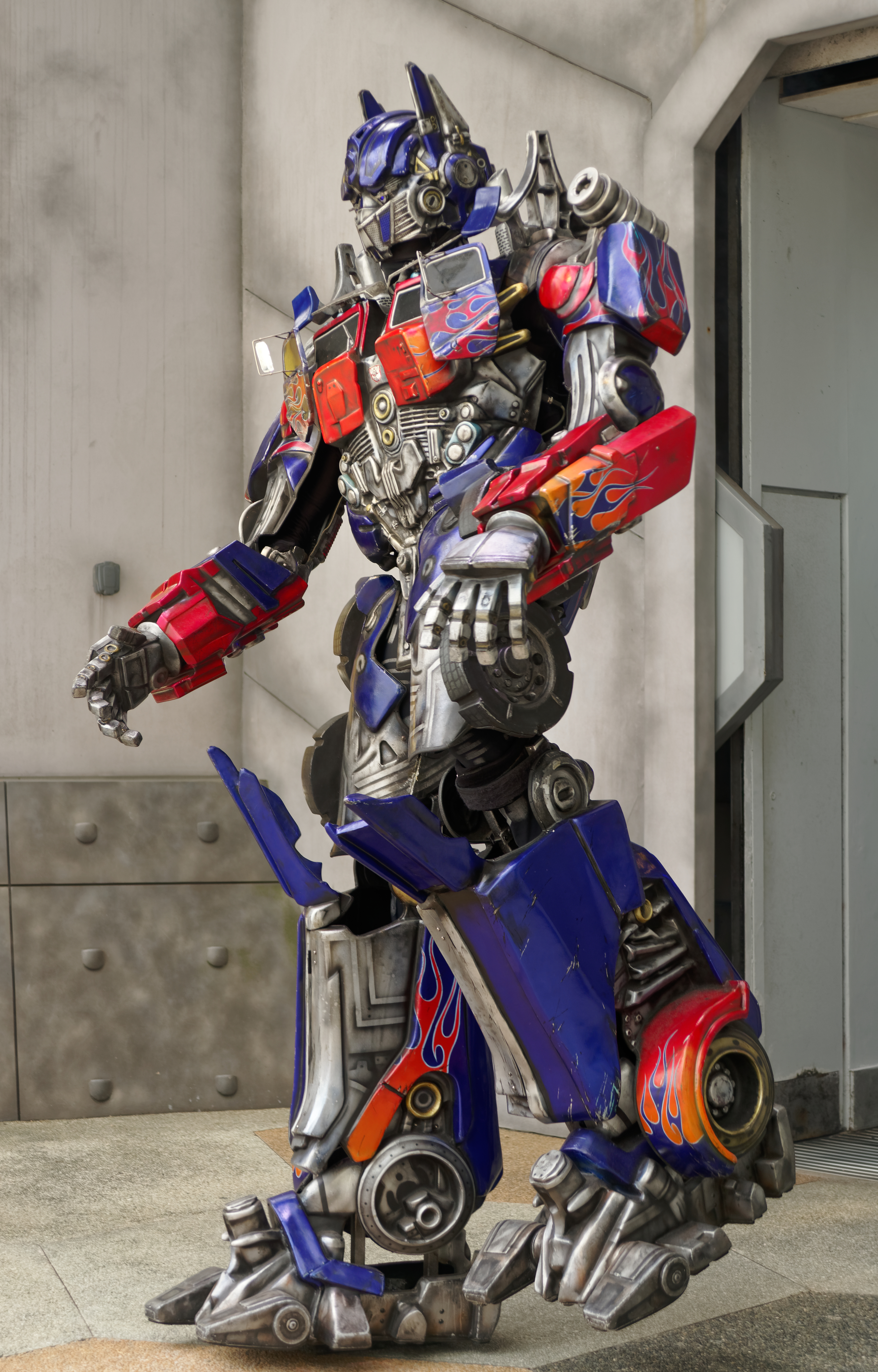
Optimus Prime, as depicted in the live-action film series, outside Transformers: The Ride in Singapore

Within his chest is a mystical talisman known as the Matrix of Leadership. This relic is, according to Ron Friedman, "the cybernetic, philosophical, physical and mystical core of Autobot leadership itself – the godhead". In The Transformers: The Movie (1986), Optimus is killed in his final fight with Megatron and, on his deathbed, passes the Matrix of Leadership on. While Hasbro insisted that Optimus permanently die in the film to make way for a new wave of toys, the film faced significant backlash for the choice. Optimus was ultimately revived in the final episode of the series' third season, and has since consistently served as the leader of the Autobots in various other forms of Transformers media. Plots involving Optimus dying and coming back to life have featured frequently in the franchise.

== Reception ==
Due to the popularity of the Transformers franchise and Optimus Prime's position as one of its most iconic characters, he is commonly regarded as among the most recognizable fictional characters of all time. He was named the 30th greatest movie hero of all time by Total Film Magazine. In March 2023, Optimus Prime received a Lifetime Achievement Award from the Nickelodeon Kids' Choice Awards. In May 2026, actress Inde Navarrette considered Optimus her "celebrity crush" in multiple interviews and social media interactions.

A study by historian Scott Manning published in Studies in Medievalism argued that Prime's role in The Transformers: The Movie echoes the themes in Arthurian mythology. In particular, Manning claimed that the motif of Optimus dying and being reborn echoes the motif of the "once and future king", and that the Matrix of Leadership and its status as the godhead echo medieval representations of the Holy Grail.

In early September 2026, shortly after the death of Peter Cullen, social media accounts for the Department of Homeland Security utilized an artificial intelligence generated image of the character with Harjinder Singh, a truck driver accused of killing three people in a turnpike accident in Florida. The image received negative backlash from fans and lawmakers, with criticism aimed of the post being racist and some in poor taste following Cullen's passing.

== Bibliography ==
- Furman, Simon (2004). Transformers: The Ultimate Guide. London: DK Publishing (Dorling Kindersley). pp. 110, 118. ISBN 978-1-4053-0461-0. OCLC 223988192.
