= Megatron =

Transformers character

- Transformers character
- Generation 1 Megatron art
- First appearance: The Transformers
- Based on: Microchange by Takara
- Voiced by: Frank Welker, Seizō Katō, others

In-universe information
- Affiliation: Decepticon

Megatron is the main antagonist of the Transformers media franchise produced by the American toy company Hasbro and the Japanese toy company Takara Tomy. He is the tyrannical leader of the Decepticons, a villainous faction of alien robots that seeks to conquer their home planet of Cybertron and the rest of the known universe, and serves as the archenemy of Optimus Prime, the leader of the heroic Autobot faction. As with all Cybertronians, Megatron can disguise himself by transforming into vehicles or weapons. His original name, in some continuities, is D-16, and he sometimes takes a form with the name Galvatron.

== History ==
The toys that would become known as Transformers were originally from the Japanese Diaclone and Microchange toy lines produced by Takara. The American company Hasbro licensed these toys to sell in the US. The original Microchange toy that became Megatron was based on the gun from the show The Man from U.N.C.L.E.. It debuted in the US in 1984 and transformed into a detailed replica of a Walther P38 handgun with a scope and silencer. The Japanese version of the toy came with a sword and plastic bullets that could be shot from its gun mode. The US release did not come with the sword or plastic bullets, although it did retain the firing pin from the original version. Since the 1980s, toy laws in the US have caused Hasbro to change Megatron's alternate mode. In 2009, a Canadian man was arrested after a three-hour standoff with police, during which he wielded only the 1980s Megatron toy in its gun mode. Throughout Transformers media, Megatron has transformed into various other alternate modes, most commonly tanks and aircraft.

Within the Microchange toy line, this character was a hero, but he was turned into a villain for the Transformers franchise. Bob Budiansky, the writer for the Transformers series published by Marvel Comics, stated that originally Hasbro took issue with the name "Megatron", saying it sounded too frightening. Budiansky responded that as the name of the lead villain, it was supposed to sound frightening. Hasbro later agreed with his reasoning and approved the name. Budiansky has said that the name is a portmanteau of megaton and electronic. In the Marvel comic series, Megatron is depicted as a former gladiator on Cybertron, the home planet of the Transformers. He gave rise to an evil faction of Cybertronians called the Decepticons and started a civil war against the heroic Autobots, led by Optimus Prime. The two factions eventually fled Cybertron before arriving on Earth.

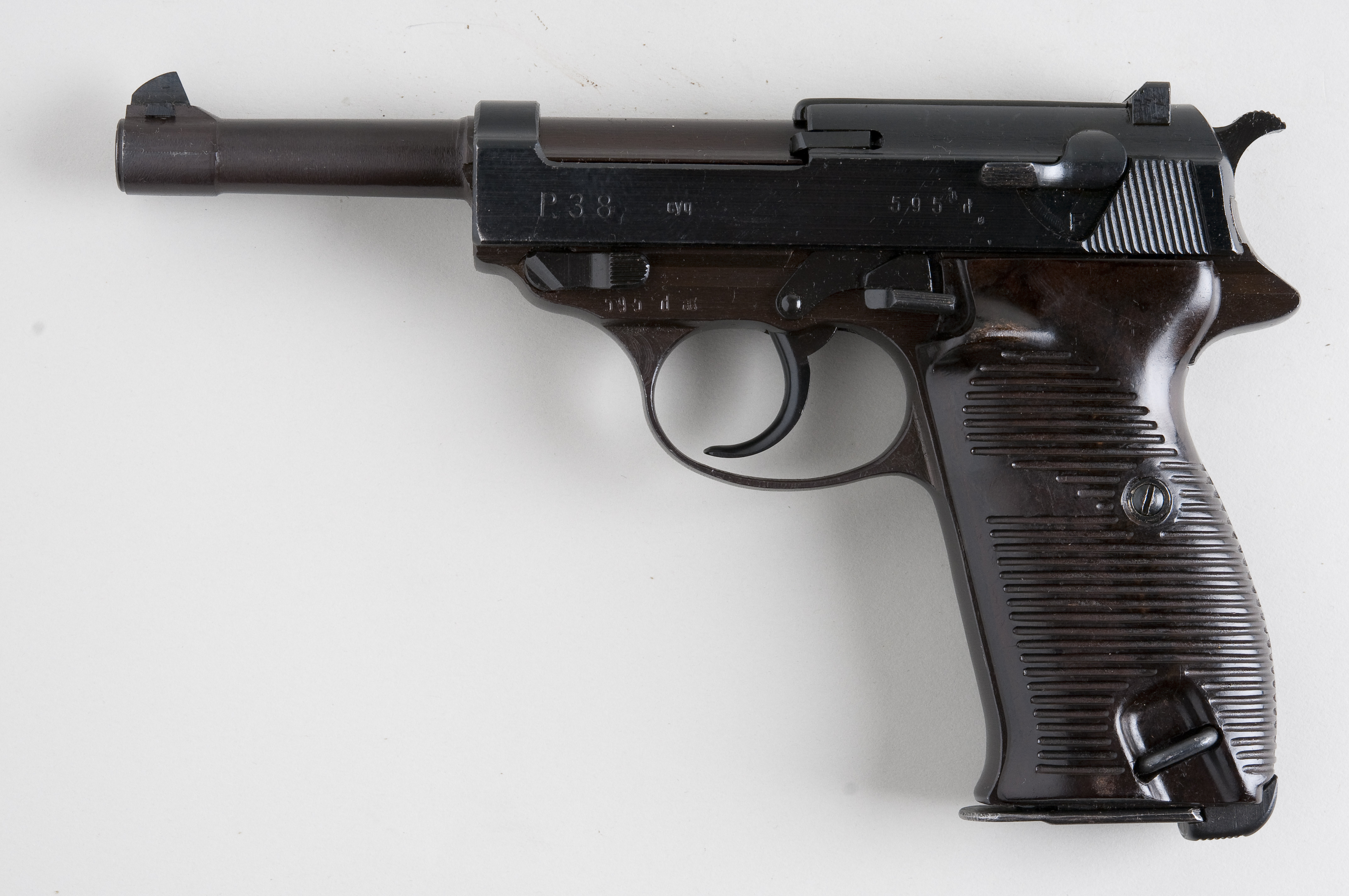
In the original Transformers animated series, Megatron transforms into a Walther P38 semi-automatic pistol.

In the 1980s cartoon, he is depicted as a ruthless military dictator that wants to win the war against the Autobots at any cost. The war drained Cybertron of all its natural resources, and he is willing to do the same to Earth in order to win. In The Transformers: The Movie, Megatron and Optimus Prime mortally wound each other in a final battle. Megatron is found by Unicron and rebuilt as Galvatron, a puppet of Unicron. In the 1980s cartoon and film, Megatron is voiced by Frank Welker in English and Seizō Katō in Japanese.

A character named Megatron serves as the villain in Transformers: Beast Wars, although this is not the same character as the one from the 1980s. This Megatron named himself after his predecessor and is the leader of the Predacons, a faction descended from the original Decepticons. He traveled back in time to prehistoric Earth to change history on the instructions of the original Megatron, which were left on an artifact called the "Golden Disk". Beast Wars Megatron transforms into a Tyrannosaurus. This version of Megatron is voiced by David Kaye.

Megatron appears as a major villain in the live-action Transformers film franchise. In this series, Megatron named himself after an ancient Transformer named Megatronus, also known as the Fallen. In the 2007 film he transforms into a Cybertronian jet, while in Revenge of the Fallen he transforms into a flying tank. In Dark of the Moon he transforms into a modified Mack Granite M915 LHRT truck. He appears as Galvatron in Age of Extinction and can transform into a 2014 Freightliner Argosy semi-truck.

The animated film Transformers One depicts the backstory of Megatron, originally named D-16, prior to him becoming a villain. It depicts him as a close friend of Orion Pax that works as a miner in Iacon City. After learning that his personal hero, Sentinel Prime, had killed the original rulers of Cybertron and collaborated with an invading race called the Quintessons, D-16 becomes angry and resentful. The film culminates with D-16 killing Sentinel Prime before taking the name Megatron, while Orion Pax gains the Matrix of Leadership (Note: The Matrix of Leadership is a mystical Autobot artefact that, according to Ron Friedman, is "the cybernetic, philosophical, physical and mystical core of Autobot leadership itself – the godhead".) and is named Optimus Prime. This backstory marks the beginning of the Cybertron civil war between the Autobots, led by Optimus Prime, and the Decepticons, led by Megatron. Megatron in Transformers One is voiced by Brian Tyree Henry.
