= Autobot =

Faction from the Transformers franchise

- Autobot insignia

Publication information
- Publisher: Marvel Comics, Dreamwave Productions, Fun Publications, Titan Magazines, IDW Publishing, and Devil's Due Publishing
- First appearance: The Transformers #1 (September 1984)

In-story information
- Base(s): Cybertron
- Leader(s): Optimus Prime; Ultra Magnus; Rodimus Prime; Elita One

The Autobots are a fictional faction of sentient robots in the Transformers multimedia franchise. They serve as the main protagonists in the franchise and their goals include defending freedom in the universe. In the series, they are in a continuous war against the villainous faction of Decepticons.

== History ==
The toys that would become known as Transformers characters originated as toys from the Japanese Diaclone and Microchange lines produced by Takara. The American company Hasbro licensed the two toy lines for US release and combined them into the Transformers series. Hasbro hired Jim Shooter, the editor-in-chief of Marvel Comics, to create a narrative universe for the Transformers toys. Shooter had the idea to make the series about two factions of robots that escaped their home planet to wage war on Earth. The names of the factions, Decepticon and Autobot, were created by the agency Griffin-Bacal Advertising.

Within the Transformers franchise, the Autobots are typically led by Optimus Prime, although they have had other leaders such as Ultra Magnus, Rodimus Prime, and Elita One. The leaders of the Autobots hold a mystical talisman known as the Matrix of Leadership. This relic is, according to Ron Friedman, "the cybernetic, philosophical, physical and mystical core of Autobot leadership itself – the godhead". The Autobots believe in peace, and their guiding ethos include "Freedom is the right of all sentient beings" and "'Till all are one." The Autobots wage war with the villainous Decepticons, a faction of imperialist Transformers that seek to conquer their home planet of Cybertron. The war continues for millions of years, and both factions eventually crash land on Earth where they continue their conflict.
