= Decepticon =

Faction from the Transformers franchise

- Decepticon insignia

Publication information
- Publisher: Marvel Comics, IDW Publishing, Dreamwave Productions, Devil's Due Publishing, Fun Publications
- First appearance: The Transformers #1 (September 1984)

In-story information
- Base(s): Cybertron
- Leader(s): Megatron

The Decepticons are a fictional faction of sentient robots in the Transformers multimedia franchise. Serving as the main antagonists in the franchise, their goals include conquering their fictional home planet Cybertron, defeating the heroic Autobots, and achieving universal domination.

== History ==
The toys that would become known as Transformers characters originated as toys from the Japanese Diaclone and Microchange lines produced by Takara. The American company Hasbro licensed the two toy lines for US release and combined them into the Transformers series. Hasbro hired Jim Shooter, the editor-in-chief of Marvel Comics, to create a narrative universe for the Transformers toys. Shooter had the idea to make the series about two factions of robots that escaped their home planet to wage war on Earth. One of the Microchange toys, which later became known as Megatron, was chosen to be the leader of the villainous Decepticon faction because he transformed into a gun. The names of the factions, Decepticon and Autobot, were created by the agency Griffin-Bacal Advertising.

The backstory of the Decepticons differs depending on continuity, but they are generally depicted as loyal followers of Megatron, a revolutionary leader and military dictator from Cybertron. Megatron declares war on the heroic Autobot faction, and this war continues for millions of years. Eventually, both factions crash land on Earth and continue their war, sometimes fighting over Earth's resources to restore their war-torn home planet. The Decepticons are characterized as imperialists and conquerors that believe in "peace through tyranny". In some continuities, they were previously gladiators or soldiers prior to the war on Cybertron.
