= List of The Transformers episodes =

This is a list containing the episodes of The Transformers, an animated television series depicting a war among the Autobots and Decepticons who could transform into vehicles, other objects and animals. Written and recorded in America, the series was animated in Japan and later South Korea. The entire series was based upon the line of transforming toys originally created by Japanese toy manufacturer Takara, which were developed into the Transformers line by American company Hasbro.

In the United States, the show aired a total of 98 episodes between September 17, 1984, and November 11, 1987. The episodes are ordered chronologically by broadcast date. Order # is the correct chronological story order for the episodes, which aired out of order.

== Series overview ==
| Season | Episodes | Originally released | |
| Season | Episodes | First released | Last released |
|---|---|---|---|
| Miniseries | 3 | September 17, 1984 | September 19, 1984 |
| 1 | 13 | October 6, 1984 | December 29, 1984 |
| 2 | 49 | September 23, 1985 | January 9, 1986 |
| Feature film | | August 8, 1986 | |
| 3 | 30 | September 15, 1986 | February 25, 1987 |
| 4 | 3 | November 9, 1987 | November 11, 1987 |

== Episodes ==
=== Miniseries (1984) ===
| No. overall | No. in season | Title | Written by | Original release date | Prod. code | Order # |
|---|---|---|---|---|---|---|
| 1 | 1 | "Day One (Note: Retroactively titled "More Than Meets the Eye, Part 1")" | George Arthur Bloom | September 17, 1984 | MP4023 | 1 |
Centuries-long warfare between two alien robot factions—the Autobots and the Decepticons—on Cybertron has caused great hardship. Both need supplies, and select numbers from each side intend to get them. The Autobots prefer peace while the Decepticons resort to violence. When the Decepticons board the Autobots' ship, it crash-lands onto Primitive Earth, knocking everyone unconscious. Four million years later, in 1984, a volcano eruption causes a probe to give them all new forms which come from vehicles in the surrounding area. They all awaken, leading to a renewed conflict and the inclusion of humans.
| 2 | 2 | "Day Two (Note: Retroactively titled "More Than Meets the Eye, Part 2")" | George Arthur Bloom | September 18, 1984 | MP4024 | 2 |
Things continue to progress; with the Decepticons on the move, and the Autobots gaining Spike and Sparkplug Witwicky as allies. Although two humans may not make a difference. The long dormancy has merely delayed Megatron and the Decepticons' ambitions, and they prove increasingly proficient in making up for lost time. Repeated clashes lead to a bigger one in a Decepticon ruby mine and more danger.
| 3 | 3 | "Day Three (Note: Retroactively titled More Than Meets the Eye, Part 3)" | George Arthur Bloom | September 19, 1984 | MP4025 | 3 |
Following the latest action, both sides are basically back to where they started. The Autobots locked Ravage in the cage and some holograms in an attempt to lure the Decepticons into a final defeat. However, Ravage escapes his prison cage, but informing that Megatron proves even sneakier seeing through Optimus' ruse and keeping them distracted from interfering in his own plans. Even worse, the Decepticons are done plundering Earth. With their ship ready and Cybertron in danger, an all-out battle between the Autobots and the Decepticons looms.

=== Season 1 (1984) ===
| No. overall | No. in season | Title | Written by | Original release date | Prod. code | Order # |
|---|---|---|---|---|---|---|
| 4 | 1 | "Transport to Oblivion" | Dick Robbins & Bryce Malek | October 6, 1984 | 700-01 | 4 |
After their base is sunk to the bottom of the ocean, Megatron and the Decepticons prioritize in returning to Cybertron with plenty of Energon. Their newly built space bridge could help them deliver the Energon, but it is unstable and will be fatal to whoever goes through it. Bumblebee and Spike manage to discover the Decepticons testing the bridge in a nearby canyon, but they are captured before they can alert Optimus. The Decepticons decide to use Spike to test the space bridge trip, and reprogram Bumblebee to put him under their control. The reprogrammed Bumblebee tells the Autobots where Spike is being held, but it turns out to be an empty cave and their rescue attempt is ambushed. The Decepticons block the entrance to the cave, trapping Optimus and the other Autobots. As Ratchet repairs Bumblebee, he sees that his programming has been altered and Bumblebee remembers the real location of the space bridge. The Autobots blast their way out of the cave and stop Spike being sent through the space bridge, sending Megatron through it instead.
| 5 | 2 | "Roll for It" | Douglas Booth | October 13, 1984 | 700-02 | 5 |
With Megatron seemingly dead, Starscream assumes leadership of the Decepticons, but his plans to steal Energon are thwarted by the Autobots. As Starscream and Thundercracker make their escape, Megatron contacts them from Cybertron to inform them that he is still alive and of his plan to steal an anti-matter formula being developed by an Earth scientist, before returning to Earth through the space bridge. Meanwhile, Spike and Bumblebee visit a lab with their friend Chip Chase, who happens to be involved with the scientist's new anti-matter experiments. The scientist gives Chip a floppy disc which lets him interact with the main lab computer from his home computer. Spike, Chip, and Bumblebee are attacked by Laserbeak after leaving the lab, but they manage to escape. The Decepticons break into the lab, but Chip warns the scientist from his home computer. The scientist has just enough time to send the anti-matter formula to Chip in order to keep it from Megatron. But Megatron is able to track down the computer holding the information and sends Starscream to Chip's home. Chip memorizes the formula and destroys the floppy disc just before being captured and taken back to the lab where Megatron is waiting. Soundwave extracts the anti-matter formula from Chip's brain and Megatron successfully creates anti-matter Energon. The Autobots rescue Chip and return to their base, where they are attacked by the Decepticons and Megatron, who is powered by anti-matter energy. However, Chip manages to create a program that overrides the Decepticons, causing them to retreat.
| 6 | 3 | "Divide and Conquer" | Donald F. Glut | October 20, 1984 | 700-03 | 6 |
The Autobots search for the new location of the Decepticons' space bridge when they get a distress call from Chip, who is at a munitions factory being attacked by the Decepticons. The Autobots attempt to stop them, but the Decepticons escape with the Energon and Optimus Prime is severely injured. His life is on the line, but Wheeljack knows exactly how to save him. However, the required part is back on Cybertron in his old laboratory. As Megatron gets the coordinates for the next location of the space bridge from Shockwave, Chip Chase uses a computer algorithm to predict its location as well. Bumblebee, Trailbreaker, Ironhide, Bluestreak, and Chip Chase go through the bridge to find the spare part and save Optimus. Megatron and the Decepticons decide to attack the Autobot base while Optimus is out of commission, but Chip and the others return in time to repair Optimus. Megatron and Optimus face off, and Megatron surrenders, for now.
| 7 | 4 | "S.O.S. Dinobots" | Donald F. Glut | October 27, 1984 | 700-05 | 8 |
A little extra muscle in the Autobot ranks would certainly be welcome. Coincidentally, nearby dinosaur fossils provide the necessary means. Soon enough, Wheeljack unveils Grimlock, Slag and Sludge. Their poor intelligence and great strength make for an uncomfortable combination. Optimus sees all of this as a mistake shutting down the Dinobots before they can harm themselves or anyone else. However, a sudden and devastating Decepticon attack with Megatron using a new and powerful weapon, prompts reconsidering this policy.
| 8 | 5 | "The Ultimate Doom, Part 1: Brainwash" | Story by : Dick Robbins, Bryce Malek, Douglas Booth, and Larry Strauss; Teleplay by : Larry Strauss | November 3, 1984 | 700-08 | 11 |
Sparkplug gets left behind when all of the Autobots believe they have a major Decepticon problem at Maharaja. In truth, the Decepticons put one over on them to leave their base vulnerable and kidnap Sparkplug. Dr. Arkeville enslaves Sparkplug for Megatron with a hypno-chip as a test of the device. It works and more humans will soon follow. Megatron has a dangerous new scheme in the works, and it includes a new space bridge. As for Sparkplug, it is decided that he can better serve Megatron when among the Autobots, ultimately making them vulnerable to a new attack.
| 9 | 6 | "The Ultimate Doom, Part 2: Search" | Story by : Dick Robbins, Bryce Malek, Douglas Booth, and Earl Kress; Teleplay by : Earl Kress | November 10, 1984 | 700-09 | 12 |
Cybertron's nearby presence has sent Earth and everyone on it into chaos. The Autobots and the Dinobots have their hands full trying to protect innocents and themselves from every possible natural disaster. Undoing what Megatron has done is a major priority, but so is rescuing Sparkplug, who is still a Decepticon prisoner on Cybertron, and the Autobots are not about to hang him out to dry. Spike and an Autobot team are sent out, but Sparkplug is still wearing a hypno-chip meaning more danger than expected. Meanwhile, the Earth-bound Autobots try to stop Megatron.
| 10 | 7 | "The Ultimate Doom, Part 3: Revival" | Story by : Dick Robbins, Bryce Malek, Douglas Booth, and Leo D. Paur; Teleplay by : Leo D. Paur | November 17, 1984 | 700-10 | 13 |
Cybertron is proving most unwelcome to Spike and the team of Autobots. However, the only chance of disabling the hypno-chips can be found there. Wheeljack quickly gets to work on that in his laboratory. Sparkplug is soon free, but numerous others are unlucky at the moment. Meanwhile, Megatron has nearly succeeded and is preparing the final stages of his energy plan. The site is an island and massive tidal waves threaten the human slaves there. Optimus leads his remaining team into battle to stop Megatron once and for all.
| 11 | 8 | "War of the Dinobots" | Donald F. Glut | November 24, 1984 | 700-07 | 10 |
Chip discovers a meteor headed for earth and alerts the Autobots who can use it as a power source. Meanwhile, the Decepticons are still recovering from their defeat by the Dinobots. Megatron sends Soundwave to watch the Dinobots and discover their weaknesses. The meteor crashes and Optimus orders the Dinobots to guard it while he and the other Autobots return to their base to run tests on a piece of it. Optimus is pleased with the Dinobots that he orders two more created, but Megatron uses Soundwave's report on the Dinobots to turn them against Optimus. Soon, the Autobots are facing the battle fury of Grimlock, Slag and Sludge. The only chance of setting things right lies with the construction and success of the newest set of Dinobots Snarl and Swoop.
| 12 | 9 | "Countdown to Extinction" | Reed Robbins & Peter Salas | December 1, 1984 | 700–11 | 14 |
Starscream plans to destroy Earth to gather energy from the destruction and rule Cybertron. He sets a timer in Dr. Arkeville's lab. Dr. Arkeville tries to save Earth, but only the Decepticons can use their computer. Optimus then shoots a blast from Megatron's gun form, making Starscream return to Earth, where he is punished by Megatron.
| 13 | 10 | "Fire in the Sky" | Dick Robbins, Bryce Malek, and Alfred A. Pegal | December 8, 1984 | 700-04 | 7 |
The heat energy of the earth's core is being drained, causing the planet to slowly start freezing over. Of course, the Decepticons are behind it, using the earth's energy to fill Energon cubes in the Arctic Circle. While excavating, they discover a Transformer frozen in the ice and work to revive him. As they do, Starscream reveals him as Skyfire, whom he knew back on Cybertron, and explains that they had been researching ancient earth millions of years ago when Skyfire crashed. Meanwhile, the Autobots track down the Decepticons and are attacked by Skyfire, who was convinced by Megatron that they are villains. When Sparkplug and Spike get stranded on a piece of ice, Skyfire rescues them and they try to explain to him that the Autobots are heroes. In order to prove to Sparkplug and Spike that the Decepticons are good, Skyfire brings them to Megatron, who takes them prisoner. Skyfire begins to doubt Megatron, and when some of the Autobots are taken hostage, Skyfire refuses to execute them. Starscream shoots Skyfire and destroys the Autobots, but it turns out that he only destroyed a hologram. The Autobots repair Skyfire before being attacked by Decepticons. Optimus Prime and Megatron face off and, as Skyfire approaches, Megatron commands him to finish Optimus off. Skyfire refuses, revealing that he is now an Autobot, and blasts a hole in the ice, defeating the Decepticons before being buried in ice again.
| 14 | 11 | "Heavy Metal War" | Donald F. Glut | December 15, 1984 | 700–13 | 16 |
The war gets more crowded with the sudden introduction of the Constructicons. However, rather than simply just providing raw numbers, they serve a greater purpose for Megatron. Their construction ingenuity ultimately gives Megatron every unique ability his team possesses. Of course, Optimus Prime is his primary target and in official combat. Per the terms, the loser must take his team off Earth forever. Given Megatron's current power and the Autobots being kept in the dark about it, how can Optimus possibly win this challenge?
| 15 | 12 | "Fire on the Mountain" | Douglas Booth | December 22, 1984 | 700-06 | 9 |
There is a crystal of massive power out there. Both sides become aware of it and the Decepticons reach it first. It can power a weapon destructive enough to eliminate the Autobots and decide the fate of Earth once and for all. Only Windcharger, Brawn and Skyfire are in range to stop them before it is too late.
| 16 | 13 | "A Plague of Insecticons" | Douglas Booth | December 29, 1984 | 700–12 | 15 |
The Insecticons arrive on Earth, and certainly give the Autobots and the Decepticons good reason to take notice. The Insecticons have more in common with the latter than the former. They do not scare the Autobots into submission, but bravery is hardly enough. Faced with such sheer power, the Autobots must rely on their intelligence and all of their resources to win.

=== Season 2 (1985–86) ===
| No. overall | No. in season | Title | Written by | Original release date | Prod. code | Order # |
|---|---|---|---|---|---|---|
| 17 | 1 | "Dinobot Island, Part 1" | Donald F. Glut | September 25, 1985 | 700–29 | 14 |
Powerglide and Bumblebee discover a strange island in the middle of the ocean while observing a strange energy reading. They are attacked by a Pteranodon, causing them to crash onto the island, which they find to be inhabited by dinosaurs. They escape and report back to the other Autobots. Optimus decides that the newly discovered island may be the best place to train the well-meaning but clumsy Dinobots. Soundwave happens to be monitoring the conversation and Megatron orders Lazerbeak to find out more. The Autobots return to "Dinobot Island" followed by Lazerbeak, who reports back to Megatron that the island is full of energy sources. Starscream warns of a strange wave reading but Megatron invades the island anyway. As the Dinobots start training, they see the Decepticons collecting the island's energy and go to stop them. However, Megatron sees them coming and forces the Dinobots into a nearby tar pit. Meanwhile, a time warp opens up on the mainland, with a caveman and wooly mammoth coming through to attack Spike and Bumblebee.
| 18 | 2 | "Dinobot Island, Part 2" | Donald F. Glut | September 26, 1985 | 700–30 | 15 |
The Decepticons continue to steal the island's energy, despite Starscream's warning that altering the balance of the island's energy could have disastrous consequences. Back at the Autobot base, Optimus and the others start receiving strange alerts about time warps opening up in the city and go to investigate. The arrive to find more cavemen and mammoths attacking cars and buildings. The Autobots herd them all back through the time warp just before it closes. They bring in Chip Chase, who uses Teletraan 1 to locate the source of the time disturbances: Dinobot Island. Back on the island, the Dinobots manage to escape the tar pit thanks to Slag's fire breath. Optimus and the Autobots show back up to stop the Decepticons with the help of the Dinobots, who have also recruited the other dinosaurs on the island to help protect their home.
| 19 | 3 | "Autobot Spike" | Donald F. Glut | September 23, 1985 | 700–16 | 1 |
A Decepticon attack leaves Spike critically wounded. To save his life, Sparkplug and the Autobots transfer Spike's mind into an experimental robot called Autobot X while the doctors at the hospital work on healing his human body, making him 'Autobot Spike'. However, the procedure has a side effect which causes Spike's mind to become unstable. Upon learning about this, Megatron finds Spike and manipulates him into joining the Decepticons, but a battle against the Autobots brings Spike to his senses.
| 20 | 4 | "The Immobilizer" | Earl Kress | September 24, 1985 | 700–21 | 6 |
An opportunity to defeat the Decepticons arises, courtesy of Wheeljack and a new invention. The effects may only be temporary, but the Immobilizer lives up to its name against any Transformer. Little time passes before the Decepticons learn about it. A new friend to the Autobots, Carly, unwittingly helps them. Now, the soon-modified Immobilizer gives the Decepticons the means to end the war once and for all. Brawn and Jazz are soon left standing, leaving them, Spike and Carly a lot of work to do.
| 21 | 5 | "Traitor" | George Hampton & Mike Moore | September 27, 1985 | 700–20 | 5 |
It is believed that the electron cells could be very valuable assets in the war. The lure of this power brings the Decepticons and the Insecticons together again. They have had problems with each other in the past, however, problems that Mirage tries to exploit to the Autobots' advantage. He is found out and Bombshell attaches a Cerebro-shell to him. With Mirage their puppet, the Decepticons and the Insecticons intend to finish the Autobots once and for all.
| 22 | 6 | "Enter the Nightbird" | Richard Milton & Sylvia Wilson | September 30, 1985 | 700–25 | 10 |
The Autobots agree to protect a new special robot created by a Dr. Fujiama when he unveils it to the world. The robot is called Nightbird and is the first "female ninja robot." However, the Decepticons show up and take her. They then reprogram her to follow their orders and instruct her to steal Teletraan 1's World Energy Chip, which contains a list of the world's energy sources. Nightbird then infiltrates the Autobot base and steals the chip. After a chase through the desert, the Autobots finally manage to restrain Nightbird without damaging her, which causes Megatron, Skywarp, and Thundercracker to come to her rescue. However, after Megatron threatens to replace Starscream with Nightbird as his second in command, Starscream follows them and incapacitates Nightbird. The Decepticons chase Starscream and the Autobots return Nightbird to Dr. Fujiama. He decides to put Nightbird away, unaware that she is still under the Decepticons' control.
| 23 | 7 | "Changing Gears" | Larry Parr | September 21, 1985 (Japan); October 1, 1985 (USA) | 700–17 | 2 |
Gears is in a foul mood, so nothing is really new there. However, the Decepticons suddenly strike and get the drop on him. The thing is, all they want from him is his personality cartridge. Now, Gears has one heck of a sunny disposition no matter who he is around. Meanwhile, the Decepticons have the final component for the solar needle. If they are not stopped, the sun itself will be destroyed. Note: Transformers: Revenge of the Fallen has a similar plot to this episode.
| 24 | 8 | "A Prime Problem" | Dick Robbins & Bryce Malek | October 2, 1985 | 700–26 | 11 |
Megatron plans to destroy the Autobots by creating a clone of Optimus Prime to lead them into a deadly trap that he has set for them. When Spike is captured by the Decepticons, the Autobots must figure out which Optimus is the real one, save Spike, and thwart Megatron's plan.
| 25 | 9 | "Atlantis, Arise!" | Douglas Booth | October 3, 1985 | 700–23 | 8 |
The Decepticons stumble upon a magnificent find: the legendary Atlantis. They believe that Atlantean forces could prove invaluable to them finally winning the war. Once at the surface level, the battle-hungry Atlanteans strike and strike hard. The Autobots face tough times and Washington, D.C. is next. However, while enjoying the sights, the Decepticons had better keep their own guard up around their supposed Atlantean allies.
| 26 | 10 | "Attack of the Autobots" | David Wise | October 4, 1985 | 700–19 | 4 |
A solar power satellite is desired by the Decepticons. To pull off the theft, they need the Autobots out of the way. Rather than try to destroy them, however, Megatron hatches a plan to change their loyalties instead. The keys to this plot are sabotaged energy rechargers in the Autobot base. Now, when they use them, the unknowing Autobots are imprinted with Decepticon ideals and forced to act just like them. Only Bumblebee and Jazz escape this fate. Sparkplug comes up with an invention to change the Autobots back, but they still have to stop the Decepticons.
| 27 | 11 | "Microbots" | David Wise | October 7, 1985 | 700–33 | 18 |
A team of archeologists discover the Decepticon's old crashed spaceship in South America, buried in the earth for four million years. The Decepticons reach the ship before the Autobots and Megatron claims the Heart Of Cybertron, the source of power for the ship. He installs it into himself and as the Autobots attack, he easily defeats them. The Autobots are still able to escape and return to the Ark for repairs. Perceptor suggests shrinking themselves down to enter Megatron's body and remove the Heart of Cybertron. Optimus sends Bumblebee and Brawn along with Perceptor. Powerglide flies over the Decepticons, allowing the team of shrunken Autobots to enter Megatron's system. The Decepticons attack the Autobot base but Perceptor's team finds the Heart of Cybertron and removes it just in time. It's destabilized outside of Megatron's body though and the Autobots throw it into space and destroy it.
| 28 | 12 | "The Master Builders" | David N. Gottlieb & Herb Engelhardt | October 8, 1985 | 700–31 | 16 |
The Constructicons suddenly get the drop on the desert-bound Grapple and Hoist. However, they claim to not be looking for a fight but instead looking to help in the Autobot cause. They prove their newfound loyalties by using their skills on Grapple's powerful solar energy-collection tower schematics. Grapple is thrilled at the opportunity, especially since Optimus turned it down earlier. The Constructicons are lying and Megatron plans to use the power tower for himself.
| 29 | 13 | "The Insecticon Syndrome" | Douglas Booth | October 9, 1985 | 700–28 | 13 |
The Insecticons feed on a new energy source that proves to be unstable, threatening to blow them to smithereens. With the power core inside them, the Autobots must find an antidote and prevent the Insecticons from exploding inside Iron Mountain.
| 30 | 14 | "Day of the Machines" | David Wise | October 10, 1985 | 700–24 | 9 |
The Torq III supercomputer is online and promises to be of good use to humanity, but is not a secret from Megatron. In short order, a reprogramming grants the Decepticons practically endless supplies of oil. The Autobots quickly go to work in order to try to foil Megatron's current plan, but a difficult choice must be made.
| 31 | 15 | "Megatron's Master Plan, Part 1" | Donald F. Glut | October 14, 1985 | 700–34 | 19 |
With the help of the wealthy Shawn Berger, Megatron turns the public against the Autobots. But Spike discovers the tape as a Decepticon trick. But before the boy can reveal the truth, the Autobots are found guilty and banished from Earth. Megatron reprograms Teletran One, sending the Autobots on a one-way journey into the sun.
| 32 | 16 | "Megatron's Master Plan, Part 2" | Donald F. Glut | October 15, 1985 | 700–35 | 20 |
With the Autobots banished from Earth, the Decepticons are free to do as they desire. Megatron betrays Shawn Berger and imprisons him along with Spike, Sparkplug, Chip, and the mayor of Central City. Meanwhile, the Autobots struggle to escape from their predicament and return to Earth to save it from the Decepticons.
| 33 | 17 | "Auto Berserk" | Antoni Zalewski | October 16, 1985 | 700–32 | 17 |
A battle with the Decepticons leaves Red Alert's logic and reason circuits fried. As a result, Red becomes paranoid and believes that his own fellow Autobots are plotting to betray him. Starscream discovers the situation and he tricks the paranoid Red Alert into helping him steal an experimental weapon. Now, the Autobots must save Red Alert before he explodes.
| 34 | 18 | "City of Steel" | Douglas Booth | October 17, 1985 | 700–18 | 3 |
The Decepticons hit New York City, and most definitely not for the sights. Instead, New Yorkers may have to get used to living in vastly different conditions. Even worse, the Decepticons foil Optimus' attempt to stop them and exact a vicious toll on him. Now, in addition to undoing what has been done to New York City, the other Autobots must rebuild their leader from numerous parts. Problem is, they will have to scour the city first to do so.
| 35 | 19 | "Desertion of the Dinobots, Part 1" | Earl Kress | October 21, 1985 | 700–36 | 21 |
The Dinobots feel taken for granted lately. This could not have come at a worse time, though, as a deadly scourge strikes every other Transformer. Only Cybertronium can cure their collective ills, but only the Decepticons have easy access to it. With the Autobots in serious trouble, the Dinobots are practically left to decide whether they will live or die.
| 36 | 20 | "Desertion of the Dinobots, Part 2" | Earl Kress | October 22, 1985 | 700–37 | 22 |
Things get worse for the Autobots, while the Decepticons are back to full strength. With the Dinobots gone, hope certainly seems lost. On Cybertron, Spike and Carly appeal to the Dinobots for their help. Even if the two humans can succeed, though, the Decepticons intend to make sure that the Autobots never even lay eyes on Cybertronium under any circumstances. Saving the day ends up falling to Swoop and the two humans.
| 37 | 21 | "Blaster Blues" | Larry Strauss | October 23, 1985 | 700–38 | 23 |
Radios across Earth suddenly experience 'technical difficulties.' Once alerted to this trouble, the Autobots trace the source of the trouble to the moon-located Megatron and Decepticons. With all sorts of human matters experiencing trouble, many Autobots have a lot on their plates. Fighting the Decepticons head-on, though, falls to Blaster who has been itching to prove the worth of his unique power and Cosmos. Omega Supreme also takes on Astrotrain.
| 38 | 22 | "A Decepticon Raider in King Arthur's Court" | Douglas Booth | October 24, 1985 | 700–39 | 24 |
The discovery of a mysterious time transporter sends Spike and the Transformers to medieval times, where Starscream plots to take over the home of a knight named Sir Aethling the Red. With the help of their new friends in the past, Spike and the Autobots defeat the Decepticons and take them back to the present with them.
| 39 | 23 | "The God Gambit" | Buzz Dixon | October 28, 1985 | 700–41 | 26 |
The Decepticons arrive on a planet called Titan, where Astrotrain tricks its natives into worshiping him and the other Decepticons as sky gods. When Cosmos is captured, Jazz, Perceptor, and Omega Supreme travel to Titan to rescue him. There, they must reveal the truth to the people of Titan about the Decepticons' deception.
| 40 | 24 | "The Core" | Dennis Marks | October 29, 1985 | 700–27 | 12 |
A means to forcibly use Devastator for the side of good is found. This proves quite fortuitous, as Megatron and the Decepticons are embarking on a new, dangerous plan. Regardless of the consequences to the planet, they want energy from the Earth's core itself. Worse, they have nearly drilled the whole way there. A showdown is looming underground, but both sides' attempts to use Devastator for their benefit spell disaster for all of them. Can both sides save the day and themselves from Devastator?
| 41 | 25 | "Make Tracks" | David Wise | October 30, 1985 | 700–42 | 27 |
A rash of car thefts suddenly occurs. The latest theft Tracks in vehicle mode. He is briefly damaged in the process and is unable to save himself. Later, he shows his thief the error of his ways and convinces him to do good. It turns out that all of the thieves are really working for the Decepticons. The stolen cars will be used to create an army against the Autobots. Can Tracks and his new friend foil their plan before it's too late?
| 42 | 26 | "The Autobot Run" | Donald F. Glut | October 31, 1985 | 700–22 | 7 |
Megatron believes that if the Autobots could not transform to robot mode, they would be easy prey for the Decepticons. A new weapon is about to give him the chance to find out. Meanwhile, charity work gives a number of Autobots the chance to help humanity without having to fight in the process. Simple car activities await them, but so does a Decepticon attack. Little time passes before the Autobots are unable to transform and are at the Decepticons' mercy. Saving the day falls to just a handful of Autobots.
| 43 | 27 | "The Golden Lagoon" | Dennis Marks | November 4, 1985 | 700–40 | 25 |
Fierce action leads both Beachcomber and Thrust to stumble upon electrum, a liquid key to invincibility. There is a forest lagoon's worth of the stuff, but only the Decepticons succeed in making a claim. The results, of course, render the Autobots' weapons essentially useless. The only hope that the Autobots have is to try to fight fire with fire, but Megatron is not about to give them the chance. What price must be paid for victory?
| 44 | 28 | "Quest for Survival" | David Wise | November 5, 1985 | 700–44 | 30 |
Though the Insecticons are a growing threat, a new insecticide may be able to stop them in their tracks. A trip into space is required to get it, but Bumblebee, Cosmos, and Spike succeed. The path back to Earth means a confrontation with the Morphobots, dangerous hybrids of plants and robots. As bad as a space confrontation is, things get worse when some Morphobots secretly arrive on Earth with Spike and the two Autobots. The whole team will have to find a way to tamp down this threat a task made more difficult by the Decepticons now after the insecticide.
| 45 | 29 | "The Secret of Omega Supreme" | David Wise | November 6, 1985 | 700–45 | 31 |
Omega Supreme seems a bit off lately and Optimus wants to know why. After having to order Omega Supreme, Optimus gets more than he bargained for. Long ago, Omega Supreme defended Crystal City, where he was once friends with the Constructicons. Times were good. But their friendship came to an abrupt end because of Megatron and a little reprogramming. Becoming evil, the Constructicons set out to follow his orders, bringing them into conflict with their former friend, Omega Supreme.
| 46 | 30 | "Child's Play" | Beth Bornstein | November 7, 1985 | 700–43 | 28 |
During a Transformer battle, the space bridge malfunctions. A strange world of massive giants awaits Autobots and Decepticons alike. Such a situation is not easy for those used to being among the tallest around. The Transformers need to find a way back home and one local child is the key. However, this planet is otherwise unwelcome to outsiders. If the Transformers do not hurry, they will be in big trouble.
| 47 | 31 | "The Gambler" | Michael Charles Hill | November 11, 1985 | 700–46 | 29 |
The Autobots are eager to put recent experiences behind them, but rest-and-relaxation is not likely to happen. An alien trap leaves everyone but Smokescreen powerless, as well as the ship itself. A little Energon can fix this, but the only way to get some presents certain challenges. He is even forced to trust an alien that helped get him into this mess. Now, can Smokescreen master the art of gambling and win big? And can Dirge, Ramjet, and Astrotrain be kept at bay throughout all of this?
| 48 | 32 | "The Search for Alpha Trion" | Beth Bornstein | November 12, 1985 | 700–52 | 37 |
On Cybertron, Shockwave is appalled to find a team of female Autobots (consisting of Chromia, Moonracer, Firestar, Greenlight, and Lancer) led by Optimus Prime's long-lost love interest, Elita One. Realizing that the Decepticons have captured Elita, Optimus travels to Cybertron to rescue her, but he is captured as well. Elita uses her special power to save him, but it drains her life force. Optimus takes her to Alpha Trion, hoping that he could save her.
| 49 | 33 | "Auto-Bop" | David Wise | November 13, 1985 | 700–51 | 36 |
People are partying to music at a local dance club. They are really subtly being mind-controlled to obey Megatron's orders. Soundwave, unsurprisingly, is overseeing this project. The Decepticon-controlled humans soon start seeming weird to casual observers prompting the Autobots to get involved. It will take Tracks, Blaster, Raul, and other humans to undo this Decepticon plot. Can they take down Soundwave and find a way to break the mind control?
| 50 | 34 | "Prime Target" | Flint Dille & Buzz Dixon | November 14, 1985 | 700–50 | 35 |
Across the globe, one British hunter has amassed an impressive collection of dead animals. The desire for a challenge, though, has prompted him to set sights on the most challenging prey of all, Optimus Prime. However, this hunter is no fool and intends to confront his quarry on his own terms. A number of captured Autobots certainly provides the bait to lure Optimus in. Can the Autobot leader survive what awaits him in the hunter's castle and save the day?
| 51 | 35 | "The Girl Who Loved Powerglide" | David Wise | November 18, 1985 | 700–53 | 38 |
Powerglide befriends a young woman named Astoria who is being targeted by the Decepticons. It would stand to reason the Decepticons are targeting Astoria is that she might have a secret formula her father was working on before he died and left his company to her. When the Decepticons abduct Astoria, Powerglide must find her and rescue her. But can they stop Megatron from getting his hands on Astoria's father's formula?
| 52 | 36 | "Triple Takeover" | Larry Strauss | November 19, 1985 | 700–49 | 34 |
In their attempt to take command of the Decepticons, Astrotrain and Blitzwing decide to trick Starscream into leading himself and Megatron into a trap, which results in chaos on Earth, where they proceed to wreak havoc, threatening to endanger innocent humans in the process as well. But can the Autobots put a stop to Astrotrain and Blitzwing's plan?
| 53 | 37 | "Sea Change" | Douglas Booth | November 20, 1985 | 700–48 | 33 |
The evil Deceptitran has been making life miserable for an alien world and resistance efforts have been slow going. However, one female fighter's encounter with Seaspray may help tip the scales. Head over heels in love, Seaspray is all too happy to help her. Still, a bigger transformation than anything Transformers regularly do awaits him. Even then, is Seaspray up to the task of defeating Deceptitran?
| 54 | 38 | "Hoist Goes Hollywood" | Earl Kress | November 21, 1985 | 700–54 | 39 |
Hollywood productions don't always run smoothly, and one case almost sees stuntmen in for real-life trouble. Fortunately, tragedy is averted in the nick of time by Hoist. Since mere thanks are not enough, Hoist now has a shot at being on the silver screen. Could Hollywood be ready for Hoist and his entourage Sunstreaker, Powerglide, Warpath, and Tracks? More importantly, can they overcome a Decepticon plot involving Dirge and one of Wheeljack's inventions? The answers may be more exciting than the movie itself.
| 55 | 39 | "The Key to Vector Sigma, Part 1" | David Wise | November 25, 1985 | 700–55 | 40 |
With the Stunticons (Motormaster, Dead End, Breakdown, Drag Strip, and Wildrider) at their disposal, the Decepticons hope to crush the Autobots once and for all. Problem is, the Stunticons will always be lifeless pieces of metal without the Cybertron-located Vector Sigma. Finding Vector Sigma is not really the challenge. Finding the Key is. Upon learning that something is up, the Autobots quickly jump into action and search. It is practically a race to see who will be the first to find the Key and use it to access Vector Sigma.
| 56 | 40 | "The Key to Vector Sigma, Part 2" | David Wise | November 26, 1985 | 700–56 | 41 |
With the Stunticons operational and the Key in hand, the situation is definitely in the Decepticons' favor. Most severe of all, the Key will allow Megatron to eliminate all organic life on Earth replacing it with technology. The Autobots need new allies the Aerialbots (Silverbolt, Air Raid, Fireflight, Skydive, and Slingshot) and quickly. Being unable to use Vector Sigma, though, complicates that idea. It will take sacrificing one life to give the Aerialbots theirs. This episode reveals the Aerialbots and Stunticons combined modes: Superion and Menasor. On top of that, despite his status, Silverbolt has acrophobia.
| 57 | 41 | "Aerial Assault" | Douglas Booth | December 10, 1985 | 700–57 | 47 |
Plans for an air fortress currently take up the Decepticons and Combaticons' time. An arms smuggler helps them 'acquire' a Middle Eastern palace and airplanes essential to the plot. It's rather complicated but necessary to maintain secrecy as best as possible. Upon arriving into the region themselves, the Aerialbots try to take care of business. Slingshot and Sky Dive get into big trouble but are saved by Hassan who has a personal stake in this situation. Will he be enough to help the Aerialbots come out on top?
| 58 | 42 | "Masquerade" | Donald F. Glut | December 16, 1985 | 700–63 | 48 |
The Decepticons are up to something and a series of thefts by the Stunticons are related. The Stunticons themselves end up biting off more than they can chew against some Autobots and get locked up. The Autobots are still in the dark about Megatron's latest plan, though, but there is a remedy from unsurprisingly Wheeljack. Advanced paint makes Optimus (as Motormaster), Jazz (as Dead End), Mirage (as Drag Strip), Sideswipe (as Breakdown), and Windcharger (as Wildrider) look exactly like each of the Stunticons. The plan is to infiltrate, learn about and foil Megatron's plan. It will not be easy to pass for the Stunticons while surrounded by Decepticons, though, especially when the real ones escape Autobot captivity.
| 59 | 43 | "Trans-Europe Express" | David Wise | December 23, 1985 | 700–59 | 43 |
Autobots are suddenly Europe-bound for a charity race. They and every human driver including Augie Canary intend to win and leave the others in their dust. No one realizes that the Decepticons and the Stunticons are lurking about masterminding the whole thing. The Pearl of Bahoudin and Augie's unique car play roles in their latest plot against Earth. The former is especially dangerous if in the wrong hands. It is ultimately up to Bumblebee, Bluestreak, Tracks, and Augie to foil them and their plot.
| 60 | 44 | "War Dawn" | David Wise | December 25, 1985 | 700–58 | 42 |
The Aerialbots are in trouble when they become trapped in the distant past of Cybertron via a time machine. There, they end up 9 million years in the past, where they befriend and save the life of a gentle robot named Orion Pax. Back in the present, the Autobots are battling the Decepticons who have reactivated a headless Guardian robot. But will the Aerialbots be able to return to their own time and stop Megatron from destroying the Autobots?
| 61 | 45 | "Cosmic Rust" | Paul Davids | December 26, 1985 | 700–60 | 44 |
When Megatron becomes infected with a plague that threatens to wipe out entire races of robots, he decides to kidnap Perceptor and force him to cure him of his infection. But of course, even if Perceptor gives him the cure for this plague, Megatron has no intention of maintaining his part of the bargain. When Megatron is cured, he uses the same plague as a weapon against Perceptor and the other Autobots. But will the Autobots be able to get the antidote for the infection before it's too late?
| 62 | 46 | "Kremzeek!" | David Wise | December 27, 1985 | 700–47 | 32 |
Routine matters accidentally result in Kremzeek, who is small, seemingly sentient, and made of pure energy. However, this little guy proves to be rather annoying quickly and scrambles all but Optimus, Bumblebee, Blaster, and Inferno. Worse, he proves to be exceedingly dangerous and the people of Japan are about to learn that firsthand. The four Autobots and a local scientist have to move it to counter this literally growing threat. Meanwhile, an energy magnet plays a role in the Decepticons' latest plan.
| 63 | 47 | "Starscream's Brigade" | Michael Charles Hill | January 7, 1986 | 700–61 | 45 |
Another failure to topple Megatron and a prompt island exile hardly deter Starscream. Abandoned World War II-era vehicles and stolen personality components provide the 'tools that he needs. In no time, the five Combaticons are online and serving Starscream. These five quickly prove formidable when they are apart and also when they are united in their giant robot mode which is named Bruticus. Can Megatron possibly overcome Starscream and Bruticus?
| 64 | 48 | "The Revenge of Bruticus" | Larry Parr | January 8, 1986 | 700–62 | 46 |
The recent defeat has not dampened Starscream and the Combaticons' resolve, which spells bad news for everyone else. They tamper with the space bridge to bring Earth and the sun a lot closer together. All is indeed going well for Starscream until the Combaticons start thinking for themselves. With Cybertron soon also in danger, a battle royal involving Optimus, Megatron, and Bruticus await. Meanwhile, chaos on Earth leaves the Protectobots with their hands full.
| 65 | 49 | "B.O.T." | Earl Kress | January 9, 1986 | 700–64 | 49 |
The Combaticons pursue a personal agenda, which the Protectobots gladly interrupt. The only one to make it out in one piece, Swindle cuts his losses at the other Combaticons' expense by selling them off piece by piece. Megatron, however, wants all of the Combaticons back and gives Swindle proper motivation a timed bomb placed in his head. Swindle finds his efforts complicated by three college students and their B.O.T. science project. They unknowingly used Brawl's personality component, which not only makes B.O.T. 'unique' it also makes it deadly dangerous. All this and another deadly Megatron plot against the Autobots, too. Jerrica and Kimber Benton from Jem and the Holograms, make cameos.

=== The Transformers: The Movie (1986) ===
The Transformers: The Movie is a 1986 animated feature film. It was released in North America on August 8, 1986. Set to an upbeat rock music soundtrack, the movie has a decidedly darker tone than the television series, with detailed visuals in Toei Animation's typical animated feature film styling. The film features several grand battles in which a handful of major characters die.

| Title | Directed by | Written by | Original release date |
|---|---|---|---|
| The Transformers: The Movie | Nelson Shin | Ron Friedman | August 8, 1986 |
The story takes place in 2005, twenty years after the events of the TV series' second season and serves as a bridge to the third season. Decepticon villains are more menacing, killing Ironhide, Ratchet, Prowl, Brawn, Windcharger and Wheeljack without hesitation. Optimus Prime dies following a battle with Megatron. Later, Megatron died only to be reformed into Galvatron by Unicron, while Skywarp, Thundercracker, Shrapnel, Kickback and Bombshell are reformed as Cyclonus, Scourge and the Sweeps. Starscream is destroyed by Galvatron. Blaster gets four cassettes known as Ramhorn, Steeljaw, Eject and Rewind; Soundwave gets a new cassette called Ratbat. At the end of the film, Hot Rod becomes Rodimus Prime and uses the Matrix of leadership to destroy Unicron. He then becomes the new leader of the Autobots.

=== Season 3 (1986–87) ===
| No. overall | No. in season | Title | Written by | Original release date | Prod. code | Order # |
|---|---|---|---|---|---|---|
| 66 | 1 | "Five Faces of Darkness, Part 1" | Flint Dille | September 15, 1986 | 700–86 | 1 |
Under Rodimus Prime's leadership, the Autobots have freed their home planet of Cybertron from Decepticon control, which results in a new age of peace and happiness. But this does not last forever. When Spike, Kup, and Ultra Magnus are kidnapped by an unknown enemy, the Autobots suspect that the Decepticons are behind the kidnapping. But what happens when they discover that the Decepticons are not the ones who abducted their friends?
| 67 | 2 | "Five Faces of Darkness, Part 2" | Flint Dille | September 16, 1986 | 700–87 | 2 |
Rodimus enters the Matrix of Leadership to discover the identity of the ones who kidnapped Kup, Spike, and Ultra Magnus. Meanwhile, Cyclonus and Scourge retrieve their fallen leader, Galvatron to make matters worse. But when the Autobots come to the rescue of their kidnapped friends, the Quintessons decide to blow up their home planet of Quintessa to try to prevent their enemies from escaping.
| 68 | 3 | "Five Faces of Darkness, Part 3" | Flint Dille | September 17, 1986 | 700–88 | 3 |
In their attempt to destroy the Autobots, the Quintessons decide to ally with the Decepticons to complicate matters. Meanwhile, Rodimus and his friends end up on an unknown planet called Goo after the Quintessons destroyed their own homeworld of Quintessa. But what the Decepticons do not know is that their new allies are planning to betray them once they destroy the Autobots.
| 69 | 4 | "Five Faces of Darkness, Part 4" | Flint Dille | September 18, 1986 | 700–89 | 4 |
Galvatron returns to assume his leadership of the Decepticons once more. He meets the Quintessons, who offer him a deal he cannot refuse. Meanwhile, Rodimus enters the Matrix, where he discovers what role the Quintessons played in the Transformers' creation on Cybertron eons ago. Now, the Quintessons' goal is to regain control of Cybertron and destroy every Transformer in the galaxy.
| 70 | 5 | "Five Faces of Darkness, Part 5" | Flint Dille | September 19, 1986 | 700–90 | 5 |
The Autobots struggle to defend Cybertron and Earth from the Decepticons and the Quintessons, whose goal is to destroy the Transformers. While Metroplex battles Trypticon on Earth, Blitzwing discovers the Quintessons' true intentions, and the Autobots are forced to team up with Blitzwing to stop the Quintessons from destroying the Transformers. But do the Autobots have what it takes to defeat the alien race that played a part in their creation?
| 71 | 6 | "The Killing Jar" | Michael Charles Hill & Joey Kurihara Piedra | September 29, 1986 | 700–91 | 6 |
Ultra Magnus, Cyclonus, Wreck-Gar and Marissa Faireborn are captured by a Quintesson scientist for his experiments in behavioral study. However, the Transformers, Marissa, and the Quintesson scientist become trapped in some kind of negative universe, where they are forced to work together to escape their predicament.
| 72 | 7 | "Chaos" | Paul Davids | September 30, 1986 | 700–92 | 7 |
The Decepticons create an experimental weapon and they plan to use it against the Autobots. But the Decepticons are the least of their worries. The monstrous Chaos has awakened and Kup must overcome his fears of this ferocious beast to help his friends destroy the Decepticons' new weapon.
| 73 | 8 | "Dark Awakening" | Antoni Zalewski | October 1, 1986 | 700–93 | 8 |
While taking refuge in a mausoleum built as a final resting place for fallen Autobot heroes they lost in the Great War, the Autobots discover that former Autobot leader Optimus Prime has mysteriously returned to life. Upon seeing his old mentor, Rodimus Prime returns the Matrix of Leadership to Optimus, reverting to carefree Hot Rod once again. But things turn ugly when it becomes clear that this is not the same Optimus they once knew. Eventually, the Autobots will find out who brought Optimus back and why.
| 74 | 9 | "Starscream's Ghost" | Megeen McLaughlin | October 2, 1986 | 700–95 | 11 |
Octane, a Decepticon traitor, is on the run and the Decepticons are pursuing him across the galaxy. Despite Sandstorm's help, there is little protection that the Autobots can actually offer him. Then, Octane takes refuge in some kind of ancient Decepticon crypt on Cybertron, where he encounters the vengeful ghost of his former comrade, Starscream, who is scheming to seek his revenge against Galvatron for destroying him.
| 75 | 10 | "Thief in the Night" | Paul Davids | October 6, 1986 | 700–96 | 10 |
Desperate for power, Octane and Trypticon secretly conspire with Abdul Fakkadi to steal monuments from around the world. But when the Autobots are blamed for the theft, they must find them and return them to their rightful places.
| 76 | 11 | "Forever Is a Long Time Coming" | Gerry Conway & Carla Conway | October 8, 1986 | 700–94 | 9 |
The Quintessons construct a time machine to try to stop the Autobot Rebellion in the past, intending to change history forever. But when five of the Autobots are trapped in the past, the Autobots in the present are forced to work with the Quintessons to save the universe when their meddling with the past threatens to jeopardize the stability of reality itself. But can they succeed in rescuing their missing friends and returning A-3 (Alpha Trion), the leader of the Autobot Rebellion to his time?
| 77 | 12 | "Surprise Party" | Steve Mitchell & Barbara Petty | October 9, 1986 | 700–97 | 12 |
Daniel and Wheelie travel to an Autobot records asteroid to find out the date of Ultra Magnus' origin. Unfortunately, they get into trouble when they are captured by the Decepticons who set the asteroid on a collision course with Cybertron and only the Autobots can rescue their friends.
| 78 | 13 | "Madman's Paradise" | Craig Rand | October 13, 1986 | 700–98 | 13 |
Although he promised his parents he would stay out of trouble, Daniel gets himself into trouble when he and Grimlock accidentally activate a device that transports them to a dimension where they are rescued by a mysterious sorcerer known as the Red Wizard. But of course, what they do not know is that their savior is not what he seems. Meanwhile, Carly and the Autobots set out to find Daniel and Grimlock and bring them back home. But can they succeed in discovering the Red Wizard's true identity?
| 79 | 14 | "Carnage in C-Minor" | Buzz Dixon | October 14, 1986 | 700–102 | 17 |
On an alien world, Galvatron hatches a vile plot against the Autobots. The conniving villain steals the power of 3 peaceful harmonics and he intends to use it to destroy Metroplex. To stop Galvatron and foil his plot, the Autobots and their new friends on that alien planet must join forces to stop him from destroying Metroplex.
| 80 | 15 | "Fight or Flee" | Tony Cinciripini & Larry Leahy | October 15, 1986 | 700–106 | 21 |
The Decepticons arrive on a planet that is inhabited by Autobot pacifists. There, they invade the planet and enslave its inhabitants. To stop the Decepticons, the Autobots gain an ally of their own named Sandstorm. But can the Autobots stop the Decepticons before they could use Paradron's resources to attack Cybertron?
| 81 | 16 | "Webworld" | Len Wein & Diane Duane | October 20, 1986 | 700–101 | 16 |
In an attempt to cure Galvatron of his inherent madness, Cyclonus deceives his leader into going to an alien planet where the delusional and the insane might possibly receive compassion and help. There, the doctors begin Galvatron's treatment, which includes attempting to repair the damage that has been done to his mind. But can even an insane mind like Galvatron's ever be cured?
| 82 | 17 | "Ghost in the Machine" | Michael Charles Hill & Joey Kurihara Piedra | October 21, 1986 | 700–100 | 15 |
Although he commandeers Scourge's body, Starscream decides to cut a deal with the head of Unicron to get his old body back. The Chaos Bringer agrees to grant Starscream' request, but in exchange for his new body, he must perform 3 labors. The sly Decepticon, wanting to get his body back, agrees to the terms, and discovers Unicron's motives.
| 83 | 18 | "The Dweller in the Depths" | Paul Dini | October 30, 1986 | 700–107 | 22 |
The Autobots have a problem on Cybertron, where the Decepticons have released an ancient horror from their home planet's distant past. This ancient horror is the Dweller, a monstrous beast that drains the energy from its victims, which results in converting its victims into energy vampires. But can the Autobots stop this beast before it drains Cybertron completely dry?
| 84 | 19 | "Nightmare Planet" | Beth Bornstein | October 31, 1986 | 700–99 | 14 |
Daniel is troubled by recurring dreams of being chased by a gigantic version of Galvatron. Meanwhile, the Autobots become trapped in a nightmare fantasy world, where they are forced to team up with the Predacons to escape their predicament when they discover that their weapons have no effect on the monsters that they encounter.
| 85 | 20 | "The Ultimate Weapon" | Arthur Byron Cover | November 10, 1986 | 700–104 | 19 |
First Aid is having doubts after Swindle steals Metroplex's transformation cog for Galvatron. But of course, First Aid will soon learn how much his friends really need him when Trypticon threatens to crush Metroplex, who is unable to transform without his transformation cog. But will the Autobots be able to get Metroplex's transformation cog back from the Decepticons?
| 86 | 21 | "The Quintesson Journal" | Richard Merwin | November 11, 1986 | 700–103 | 18 |
Knowing of a destructive war between 2 alien planets, the Autobots decide to broker a peace treaty between both worlds, which includes finding the journal that once belonged to the Quintessons. Unfortunately, the Quintessons want it back and they are trying to keep the Autobots from discovering its secrets. Now, the Autobots must prevent the Quintessons from getting their journal back. But will they be able to figure out why the journal is so important to the Quintesson race?
| 87 | 22 | "The Big Broadcast of 2006" | Michael Reaves | November 12, 1986 | 700–105 | 20 |
The universe is plunged into chaos when every living being is pitted against each other, which will threaten to result in a war that could threaten to spell doom for the entire universe and all of its inhabitants. But will the Autobots be able to restore the natural order? What is the secret of the journal that the Quintessons want to prevent from being discovered?
| 88 | 23 | "Only Human" | Susan K. Williams | November 13, 1986 | 700–108 | 23 |
Victor Drath has had enough of the Autobots ruining his plans. He secures help from a mysterious man named Old Snake in making for the beginning of a deadly plot against Autobot City. A sneak attack disables Rodimus and his comrades. Then, they are surprised to wake up in artificial human bodies. Drath and Old Snake intend to finish them off and strike the city with the Autobots' own robotic bodies. Lacking their usual weapons and abilities, the Autobots must get by as humans and foil their enemies' plot to destroy Autobot City to regain their bodies.
| 89 | 24 | "Grimlock's New Brain" | Paul Davids | November 14, 1986 | 700–110 | 24 |
Grimlock becomes super smart while helping his Autobot friends deal with a problem that involves anti-electrons. Meanwhile, the Decepticons travel to the head of Unicron to find more of the anti-electrons that they need to destroy the Autobots. To help his friends, Grimlock gives life to the Technobots to battle Galvatron's deadly allies, the Terrorcons. But will Grimlock be able to return to normal when they stop Galvatron from getting the anti-electrons from inside Unicron's brain?
| 90 | 25 | "Money Is Everything" | Gerry Conway & Carla Conway | November 17, 1986 | 700–111 | 25 |
The conniving Dirk Manus runs into a lot of trouble from Marissa Fairborn and the Technobots. While Dirk is in custody, it is revealed that he somehow got a hold of a dangerous weapon and intended to sell it to the highest bidder. It also turns out that the Quintessons expressed the most interest in it, but they did not pay for it. Now, Marissa, the Technobots, and Dirk need to get the weapon back from the Quintessons before it's too late.
| 91 | 26 | "Call of the Primitives" | Donald F. Glut | November 18, 1986 | 700–112 | 26 |
The evil Primacron has plans for universal conquest, which includes giving life to Tornadron, a cloud-like entity that threatens to destroy every Transformer and whatever else gets in his way. Now, Grimlock must stop Tornedron and save the universe before it's too late. But can Grimlock find Primacron's laboratory and prevent his twisted dream from becoming a reality?
| 92 | 27 | "The Burden Hardest to Bear" | Michael Charles Hill | November 19, 1986 | 700–114 | 28 |
Feeling the pressures of leadership, Rodimus Prime is attacked by the Decepticons, who steal the Matrix of Leadership from him. As a result, Rodimus becomes Hot Rod once again, preferring to rather be the carefree Autobot he once was than the Autobot leader. Eventually, he will learn to accept his obligation in order to reclaim the Matrix from Scourge, who has been mutated by its mystical energies, which he is using to attack Earth.
| 93 | 28 | "The Face of the Nijika" | Mary Skrenes & Steve Skeates | November 20, 1986 | 700–113 | 27 |
While battling Decepticon and Quintesson forces, the Autobots end up on an unknown alien world. There, they meet the natives of this world who have been imprisoned by the Quintessons for a long time. But when Perceptor goes missing, the other Autobots must find him before the Quintessons do and free the natives from their imprisonment. But will they be able to find Perceptor and stop the Quintessons from destroying the natives?
| 94 | 29 | "The Return of Optimus Prime, Part 1" | Story by : Cherie Wilkerson & Marv Wolfman; Teleplay by : Michael Charles Hill | February 24, 1987 | 700–115 | 29 |
An embittered scientist and his partner decide that it's time to rid themselves of the Transformers on Earth. They use the lifeless body of Optimus Prime to lure the Autobots to their laboratory, where they release a dangerous space plague that pits Autobot against Autobot. But soon, this Hate Plague spreads to the Decepticons, the human race, and the entire universe as well. When Rodimus Prime falls victim to the plague as well, the galaxy's only hope is to restore Optimus Prime to life, hoping that he can find a cure for the infection.
| 95 | 30 | "The Return of Optimus Prime, Part 2" | Story by : Cherie Wilkerson & Marv Wolfman; Teleplay by : Michael Charles Hill | February 25, 1987 | 700–116 | 30 |
Uninfected, Sky Lynx rescues a Quintesson he needs to revive Optimus Prime, hoping that he can stop the Hate Plague. The operation is a success, but with the Hate Plague spreading across the galaxy, there is very little time to celebrate. With countless lives in danger, Optimus leads a team of uninfected Autobots in a desperate bid to recover the Matrix of Leadership, hoping that an answer can be found. Optimus is forced to form an alliance with Galvatron to retrieve an experimental metal that shields its user from heat and radiation. But when all the Autobots and Galvatron become infected as well, Optimus must find the cure for the Hate Plague and save the Transformers, mankind, and the entire galaxy.

=== Season 4 (1987) ===
Season 4's title sequence was made of parts from the others and TV commercials with Season 3 music.

| No. overall | No. in season | Title | Written by | Original release date | Prod. code | Order # |
|---|---|---|---|---|---|---|
| 96 | 1 | "The Rebirth, Part 1" | David Wise | November 9, 1987 | 6701-0001 | 1 |
The Decepticons decide to steal the key to the Plasma Energy Chamber, the forge where the original Autobots were created millions of years ago. The Autobots regain the key, but a volt of Plasma Energy strikes their ship, sending them millions of miles into space. They crash land on a planet called Nebulos, where some transformations are about to take place, which will result in uniting the Autobots with a band of Nebulan rebels to become a new breed of Transformer known as the Headmasters.
| 97 | 2 | "The Rebirth, Part 2" | David Wise | November 10, 1987 | 6701-0002 | 2 |
The operation to merge the Autobots and Nebulans into Headmasters proves to be a success when they go to rescue their captured friends. But the Decepticons join forces with the merciless Hive to counter-attack as Decepticon Headmasters and Targetmasters. While on Cybertron, Optimus Prime merges with Vector Sigma and discovers the deadly secret of Plasma Energy. But while on Nebulos, Zarak, evil leader of the Nebulan Hive, succeeds in turning the Hive's entire city into a Decepticon super robot, the most powerful ever created, the deadly Scorponok.
| 98 | 3 | "The Rebirth, Part 3" | David Wise | November 11, 1987 | 6701-0003 | 3 |
With Daniel and the Autobots captured, Spike finds a way to stop the Decepticons once and for all. The answer to saving his son and friends lies in the lost city of the Hive. With the help of Cerebros, Spike changes the lost city into an Autobot Headmaster named Fortress Maximus. Alas, Galvatron opens the Plasma Energy Chamber and its energy overloads the Autobots as well as Earth's sun, causing it to go nova. Now, Spike is the only one who can save the Autobots and the universe. But will Spike be able to succeed in shutting down the Plasma Energy Chamber?

=== Epilogue ===
Season 4 is the end of the American series. The Transformers continued in Japan as Transformers: The Headmasters with 35 new episodes, however, it ignores the events of "The Rebirth" and is set in a different continuity. A fifth season was aired in the United States, but consisted entirely of re-runs of previous episodes being told as stories by Powermaster Optimus Prime.

== Japanese seasons ==
In Japan, the first two seasons of the show were collectively released as a single season entitled Fight! Super Robot Lifeform Transformers (戦え！超ロボット生命体トランスフォーマー, Tatakae! Chō Robotto Seimeitai Toransufōmā), then rebranded as Transformers 2010 (トランスフォーマー2010, Toransufōmā Tsūōwanō) for season 3 (season 2 there), with all seasons aired on Nippon TV. Following the conclusion of the third season, Japan opted not to import the fourth season, but instead created a series of new animated shows to continue the story, beginning with Transformers: The Headmasters in 1987, and continuing into Transformers: Super-God Masterforce in 1988, Transformers: Victory in 1989, and the single-episode direct-to-video OVA Transformers: Zone in 1990.

| Season | Season title | Episodes | Japanese broadcast | Musical themes | | Notes |
| Season | Season title | Episodes | Japanese broadcast | Opening | Ending | Notes |
|---|---|---|---|---|---|---|
| 1 | Fight! Super Robot Life-Form Transformers | 65 | July 6, 1985 — November 7, 1986 | Tatakae! Transformers by Satoko Shimonari | Peace Again by Satoko Shimonari | Equivalent to seasons 1 and 2 of the American version. |
| 2 | Transformers 2010 | 30 | November 14, 1986 — June 26, 1987 | Dash! Transformers 2010 by Sho Hirose | What's Yours? by Sho Hirose | Equivalent to season 3 of the American version. |
| 3 | Transformers: The Headmasters | 35 | July 3, 1987 — March 28, 1988 | The Headmasters by Hironobu Kageyama | Kimi wa Transformer by Hironobu Kageyama | Japanese exclusive seasons. |
| 4 | Transformers: Super-God Masterforce | 42 | April 12, 1988 — March 7, 1989 | Chōjin Masterforce by Toshiya Igarashi | Moero! Transformer by Toshiya Igarashi | Japanese exclusive seasons. |
| 5 | Transformers: Victory | 32 | March 14, 1989 — December 19, 1989 | Transformer V by Koji Kaya | Cybertron Banzai! by Koorogi '73 | Japanese exclusive seasons. |
Others
| OVA | Transformers: Scramble City | 1 | April 1, 1986 | Tatakae! Transformers by Satoko Shimonari | Peace Again by Satoko Shimonari | Japanese exclusive OVA |
| Film | The Transformers: The Movie | 1 | August 9, 1989 | Transformers! by Lion | | — |
| OVA | Transformers: Zone | 1 | July 21, 1990 | Transformer Z by Ichirou Mizuki | Ashita no Kimi e by Ichirou Mizuki | Japanese exclusive OVA |
Total
204 episodes + 2 OVAs + 1 feature film

=== Scramble City ===
Scramble City was a special direct-to-video episode produced for the Japanese market, released in April 1986. It served to further promote the new "combiner" figures who had been introduced at the end of season 2, and a few other figures from the 1986 product line (like Ultra Magnus, Metroplex and Trypticon) who had not yet appeared in the American cartoon, which were all being released in Japan with the sub-branding of "Scramble City."

Set soon after the end of the second season, the episode focuses on the Autobots' efforts to construct a new mobile fortress, the titular "Scramble City." When the Decepticons learn of this, their combiner robots are deployed to attack, and a battle between them and their Autobot counterparts ensues, focusing on their "Scramble Power" – the interchangeability of the individual limbs – to the extent that at one point, Breakdown of the Stunticons connects to Superion to damage him. At the episode's conclusion, Scramble City is activated and assumes its robot mode of Metroplex to rout the Decepticons. However, from the ocean depths, the Decepticons' own city, Trypticon, rises.

== Generation 2 ==
Generation 2 episodes were all taken from the Generation 1 television series which had been previously produced, but with added effects and editing. These episodes aired between 1993 and 1995.

== See also ==
- List of Transformers animated series
