= Sunbow Entertainment =

Defunct American production company

- Final logo, used from 1998 to 2004
- Formerly: Sunbow Productions (1980–1995)
- Industry: Television production Animation production Animated films
- Founded: June 23, 1980; 46 years ago
- Founder: Griffin-Bacal Advertising
- Defunct: 2009; 17 years ago
- Fate: Dormant
- Successor: Sony Pictures Home Entertainment; Library: Hasbro Entertainment (productions based on their toylines); Studio 100 (everything else)
- Headquarters: 380 Lexington Avenue, New York City, United States
- Key people: Tom Griffin; Joe Bacal
- Parent: Griffin-Bacal Advertising (1980–1998); Sony Wonder (1998–2000); TV-Loonland AG (2000–2009)
- Divisions: Sunbow Productions International

Sunbow Entertainment (formerly known as Sunbow Productions until 1995) was an American animation studio and distributor, founded on June 23, 1980, and owned until May 4, 1998, by Griffin-Bacal Advertising in New York City and in the United States. Griffin-Bacal's first animations were animated commercials for Hasbro's G.I. Joe toy line. The success of the animated commercials led partners Tom Griffin and Joe Bacal to form the company. Due to their close working relationship with Hasbro, Sunbow came to be recognized as the toy giant's unofficial television arm.

== History ==
=== Beginnings and partnerships with Hasbro and Marvel Productions (1980–1992) ===
Sunbow Productions' logo, used from 1983 to 1994.

Sunbow is noted for many cartoons aired during the 1980s. Most of their work was co-produced with Marvel Productions. Although it is not limited to Hasbro's various toy lines its reputation is linked to the cartoon series tied to them. Its animation was initially produced by the Japanese animation studio Toei Animation, supplemented by the South Korean animation studio AKOM later on. Sunbow also worked with TMS Entertainment on Hasbro's Visionaries: Knights of the Magical Light.

By 1987, most of Hasbro's toy lines were losing money and internal struggles forced the company to end popular series such as Jem, G.I. Joe and Transformers. Two of Sunbow's animated movies, The Transformers: The Movie and My Little Pony: The Movie, flopped at the box office, forcing a third project, G.I. Joe: The Movie, to be released directly to video. It also led to the end of the partnership with Marvel Productions in the late-1980s.

=== Troubles with original material (1992–1998) ===
In a bid to produce original material, Sunbow produced several cartoons through the early 1990s such as The Tick and Conan the Adventurer. Only The Tick managed to gain popularity and critical acclaim.

=== Sony Wonder ownership (1998–2000) ===
On May 4, 1998, Sony Wonder, a division of Sony Music, bought Sunbow Productions in order to expand to more original programming for their television division. On May 1, 1999, Sunbow took over European distribution of Sony Wonder's TV IPs.

=== TV-Loonland ownership, dormancy and closure (2000–2009) ===
On October 3, 2000, German-based company TV-Loonland AG purchased Sony Wonder's television business assets including Sunbow Entertainment. In exchange for the purchase, Sony Wonder retained US distribution rights to the Sunbow catalogue. Previously, Rhino Entertainment owned the U.S. home video distribution rights to the Sunbow catalogue. The rights then changed hands to Sony Wonder with its acquisition of the catalogue.

On September 5, 2001, the company announced a co-production deal with Rumpus Toys to produce Kappa Mikey, with TV-Loonland holding worldwide and home video distribution rights. On May 29, 2002, the project was picked up by Noggin for its teen-oriented programming block The N. Noggin/The N signed a co-development deal for the series, For unknown reasons, Sunbow and TV-Loonland would later silently pull out of the deal, with the final produced show having no involvement with the two companies.

On October 12, 2001, Sunbow announced a co-development deal with Nickelodeon to produce Skeleton Key, an animated series based on a comic book of the same name for an initial run of 13 episodes. However, the series never materialized. On November 6, production on TV special Donner was completed (originally started in June 2001), and aired as planned on December 1, on ABC Family.

On April 10, 2002, the studio announced two additional projects - The Many Adventures of Johnny Mutton, and Mr Stick & Slug Boy. Another pickup came on October 8 with a television adaptation of the book The Day I Swapped My Dad for Two Goldfish in development; however, none of these projects would come into fruition.

After the announcement that The Cramp Twins' second season would be produced by fellow-Loonland owned studio Telemagination on October 23, 2002, Sunbow later became dormant after their existing projects were shelved, although they still remained as a company until at least 2009.

On March 29, 2007, Sony Music Entertainment announced they would shut down Sony Wonder, leaving the US deal under limbo. However, on June 20, 2007, it was announced that Sony Wonder had been moved into Sony Pictures Home Entertainment, which eventually it renamed as Sony Pictures Family Fun in 2015. However, the Sunbow licenses were not included in the purchase.

On May 14, 2008, Hasbro announced that it had obtained the rights to all the Sunbow Productions animated series based on Hasbro properties for $7 million. This includes Transformers, G.I. Joe, My Little Pony, Jem and the Holograms, and many more. These titles are currently managed as part of the Hasbro Entertainment library.

TV-Loonland filed for bankruptcy on December 9, 2009; its catalogue was acquired by German distributor Made 4 Entertainment on April 5, 2011. In February 2017, Belgian production company Studio 100 purchased a majority stake in m4e.

== Filmography ==
=== Television series ===
| Show | Year | Network | Notes |
|---|---|---|---|
| The Great Space Coaster | 1981–1983 | Syndication | Co-production with Metromedia Television |
| G.I. Joe: A Real American Hero | 1983–1986 | Syndication | Based on the Hasbro toyline of the same name. Co-production with Marvel Productions |
| The Transformers | 1984–1987 | Syndication | based on the Hasbro toyline of same name. Co-production with Marvel Productions |
| Super Sunday (aka Super Saturday): Jem and the Holograms; Inhumanoids; Robotix; Bigfoot and the Muscle Machines | 1985 | Syndication | based on the Hasbro toyline of the same name. Co-production with Marvel Productions |
| Jem and the Holograms | 1986 | Syndication | based on the Hasbro toyline of the same name. Co-production with Marvel Productions |
| Inhumanoids | 1986 | Syndication | based on the Hasbro toyline of the same name. Co-production with Marvel Productions |
| My Little Pony 'n Friends: The Glo Friends; MoonDreamers; Potato Head Kids | 1986 | Syndication | based on the Hasbro toyline of same name. Co-production with Marvel Productions; first half of the show was My Little Pony while the second half was a wheel series |
| Bucky O'Hare and the Toad Wars! | 1991–1992 | Syndication | co-production with Abrams/Gentile Entertainment, Continuity Comics, IDDH, and Marvel Productions |
| My Little Pony Tales | 1992 | The Disney Channel | based on the Hasbro toyline of the same name. Co-production with Graz Entertainment |
| Conan the Adventurer | 1992–1993 | Syndication | co-production with Graz Entertainment (Season 1), Créativité & Developpement (Season 2) and AB Productions (Season 2) |
| Conan and the Young Warriors | 1994 | CBS | co-production with Graz Entertainment |
| The Tick | 1994–1996 | Fox | co-production with Graz Entertainment and Fox Children's Productions. Currently owned by The Walt Disney Company through BVS Entertainment |
| The Mask: The Animated Series | 1995–1997 | CBS | co-production with Film Roman, Dark Horse Entertainment and New Line Television. Currently owned by Warner Bros. |
| Littlest Pet Shop | 1995 | Syndication | based on Hasbro toyline. Co-production with Créativité & Développement, and AB Productions. Currently owned by Mediawan Thematics |
| G.I. Joe Extreme | 1995 | Syndication | based on Hasbro toyline. Co-production with Gunther-Wahl Productions and Graz Entertainment |
| Salty's Lighthouse | 1997–1998 | Syndication (1997); TLC (1998) | |
| The Crayon Box | 1997–1998 | Syndication | co-production with Chiodo Bros. Productions, Random House Studio, and PolyGram Television |
| Mission Genesis | 1997 | Sci-Fi Channel | International distribution only. |
| Student Bodies | 1997–2000 | Fox | Season 1 international distribution only. Produced by Telescene and 20th Television |
| The Brothers Flub | 1999–2000 | Nickelodeon; Super RTL | co-production with Ravensburger Film + TV, Videal and Sony Wonder Television |
| Fat Dog Mendoza | 2000–2001 | Cartoon Network | co-production with TMO-Loonland, Cartoon Network Europe and Sony Wonder Television |
| Generation O! | 2000–2001 | The WB (Kids' WB) | co-production with RTV Family Entertainment and Sony Wonder Television |
| The Cramp Twins | 2001–2004 | Cartoon Network | co-production with TV-Loonland AG and Cartoon Network Europe. Season 2 was produced by Telemagination |

=== Specials ===
- G.I. Joe: The Revenge of Cobra (1984) (co-production with Marvel Productions)
- The GLO Friends Save Christmas (1985)
- Transformers: Five Faces of Darkness (1986) (co-production with Marvel Productions and AKOM)
- Visionaries: Knights of the Magical Light (1987) (co-production with TMS Entertainment)
- Transformers: The Return of Optimus Prime (1986) (co-production with Marvel Productions)
- Transformers: The Rebirth (1987) (co-production with Marvel Productions)
- Sgt. Savage and his Screaming Eagles (1994) (G.I. Joe: A Real American Hero spin-off) (co-production with Graz Entertainment)

=== Original specials ===
| Airdate | Title | Network | Notes |
|---|---|---|---|
| October 25, 1983 | The Charmkins | syndication | based on Hasbro toyline of same name |
| April 14, 1984 | My Little Pony: Rescue at Midnight Castle | syndication | based on Hasbro toyline of same name |
| March 23, 1985 | My Little Pony: Escape from Catrina | syndication | based on Hasbro toyline of same name |

Hasbro properties

Note: All programs based on Hasbro properties are co-productions with Marvel Productions. These programs are owned by Hasbro Entertainment.

=== Theatrical films ===
| Airdate | Title | Notes |
|---|---|---|
| June 20, 1986 | My Little Pony: The Movie | with Marvel Productions |
| August 8, 1986 | The Transformers: The Movie | with Marvel Productions |
| 1986 | Inhumanoids: The Movie DTV | with Marvel Productions |
| April 20, 1987 | G.I. Joe: The Movie DTV | with Marvel Productions |

=== TV specials ===
- The Secret World of the Very Young (1984)
- Donner (2001, in cooperation with Rainbow Studios and TV-Loonland AG)
