= The Transformers (TV series) =

1980s American animated series

- Genre: Science fiction; Action; Adventure; Children's
- Based on: Transformers by: Hasbro; Takara
- Showrunners: Dick Robbins; Bryce Malek; Flint Dille; Marv Wolfman; Steve Gerber
- Creative director: Jay Bacal
- Voices of: Jack Angel; Michael Bell; Gregg Berger; Susan Blu; Arthur Burghardt; Corey Burton; Roger C. Carmel; Michael Chain; Scatman Crothers; Peter Cullen; Paul Eiding; Dick Gautier; Ed Gilbert; Dan Gilvezan; Michael Horton; Casey Kasem; Buster Jones; Stan Jones; Chris Latta; Morgan Lofting; Don Messick; Michael McConnohie; John Moschitta, Jr.; Alan Oppenheimer; Tony Pope; Hal Rayle; Neil Ross; Ken Sansom; John Stephenson; Frank Welker
- Narrated by: Victor Caroli
- Composers: Johnny Douglas; Robert J. Walsh
- Countries of origin: United States; Japan (Note: Seasons 1 and 2 only.)
- Original languages: English; Japanese (seasons 1-3)
- No. of seasons: 4
- No. of episodes: 98 (list of episodes)

Production
- Executive producers: Joe Bacal; Margaret Loesch; Tom Griffin; Lee Gunther
- Producers: Gwen Wetzler; John Walker; George Singer; Gerald Moeller; Roger Slifer
- Running time: 23–24 minutes
- Production companies: Sunbow Productions; Marvel Productions; Toei Doga (S1–S3); AKOM (S2–S4)

Original release
- Network: First-run syndication (United States); Nippon TV (Japan, seasons 1-3)
- Release: September 17, 1984 – November 11, 1987

Related
- Japanese-exclusive seasons
- 1. Transformers: The Headmasters; 2. Transformers: Super-God Masterforce; 3. Transformers: Victory
- Manga
- Written by: Masumi Kaneda
- Illustrated by: Ban Magami
- Published by: Kodansha (Japan); Viz Media (United States)
- Magazine: TV Magazine
- Original run: May 1985 – July 1987
- Volumes: 3

The Transformers is an animated children's science fiction action-adventure television series that originally aired from September 17, 1984, to November 11, 1987, in syndication based upon Hasbro and Takara's Transformers toy line. The first television series in the Transformers franchise, it depicts a war among giant robots that can transform into vehicles and other objects.

The series was produced by Marvel Productions and Sunbow Productions in association with Japanese studio Toei Animation for first-run syndication. Toei co-produced the show as the main animation studio for its first two seasons, having been tasked with creating and finalizing animation models, designing transformation schemes, storyboarding some episodes, and general direction. In the third season, Toei's involvement with the production team was reduced and the animation services were shared with the South Korean studio AKOM. The show's supervising producer (Nelson Shin) was also AKOM's founder. The fourth season was entirely animated by AKOM.

The series was supplemented by a feature film, The Transformers: The Movie (1986), taking place between the second and third seasons. This series is also popularly known as "Generation One", a term originally coined by fans in response to the re-branding of the franchise as Transformers: Generation 2 in 1992, which eventually made its way into official use. The series was later shown in reruns on Sci-Fi Channel and The Hub / Discovery Family.

== Plot ==
This series focuses on the Transformers, split into two warring factions: the heroic Autobots and the evil Decepticons as they crash land on Earth and continue their eons-long conflict there.

== Background and production ==
The Transformers toyline and animated series were inspired by the Japanese toyline, Microman (a far-eastern descendant of the 12-inch G.I. Joe action figure series) by Takara. In 1980, the Microman spin-off, Diaclone, was released, featuring inch-tall humanoid figures able to sit in the drivers' seats of scale model vehicles, which could transform into humanoid robot bodies the drivers piloted. Later still, in 1983, a Microman sub-line, MicroChange was introduced, featuring "actual size" items that transformed into robots, such as microcassettes, guns and toy cars. Diaclone and MicroChange toys were subsequently discovered at the 1983 Tokyo Toy Fair by Hasbro toy company product developer Henry Orenstein, who presented the concept to Hasbro's head of R&D, George Dunsay. Enthusiastic about the product, it was decided to release toys from both Diaclone and MicroChange as one toyline for their markets, although there were eventual changes to the color schemes from the original toys to match the new series.

By 1984, U.S. regulators had removed many of the restrictions regarding the placement of promotional content within children's television programming. The way was cleared for the new product-based television program. Hasbro had previously worked with Marvel Comics to develop G.I. Joe: A Real American Hero for a three-pronged marketing scheme–the toyline, a tie-in comic book by Marvel, and an animated mini-series co-produced by Marvel's media arm, Marvel Productions, and the Griffin-Bacal Advertising Agency's Sunbow Productions production house. Given the success of that strategy, the process was repeated in 1984 when Hasbro marketing vice president Bob Prupis approached Marvel to develop their new robot series, which Jay Bacal dubbed "Transformers." Marvel's Editor-in-Chief at the time, Jim Shooter, produced a rough story concept for the series, creating the idea of the two warring factions of giant transforming alien robots; the heroic Autobots and the evil Decepticons. To flesh out his concept, Shooter called upon veteran editor Dennis O'Neil to create character names and profiles for the cast, but O'Neill's work did not meet with Hasbro's expectations, and they requested heavy revisions. O'Neill declined to make said revisions, and the project was turned down by several writers and editors approached by Shooter until editor Bob Budiansky accepted the task. Hastily performing the revisions over a weekend, Budiansky's new names and profiles were a hit with Hasbro, and production began on a bi-monthly four-issue comic book miniseries, and three-part television pilot.

Both the comic and cartoon would wind up continuing for years beyond these short-term beginnings, using Budiansky's original development work as a springboard to tell the story of the Transformers in very different ways from one another, forming two separate, unrelated continuities for the brand out of the gate. Japanese designer Shōhei Kohara was responsible for creating the earliest character models for the Transformers cast, greatly humanising the toy designs to create more approachable robot characters for the comic and cartoon. His designs were subsequently simplified by Floro Dery, who went on to become the lead designer for the series, creating many more concepts and designs in the future.

== Broadcast history ==
Season	Episodes	Originally released	
Season	Episodes	First released	Last released
Miniseries	3	September 17, 1984	September 19, 1984
1	13	October 6, 1984	December 29, 1984
2	49	September 23, 1985	January 9, 1986
Feature film		August 8, 1986	
3	30	September 15, 1986	February 25, 1987
4	3	November 9, 1987	November 11, 1987

=== Pilot miniseries ===
The three-part pilot miniseries (retroactively titled "More than Meets the Eye") first aired in the United States in September 1984. The story follows Optimus Prime's heroic Autobots and Megatron's evil Decepticons as they leave their metallic homeworld of Cybertron to search for new sources of energy to revitalize their war efforts, only to crash-land on Earth, where they remain entombed and offline for 4 million years. Awakening in the year of 1984, the Decepticons set about pillaging the energy sources of Earth, while the Autobots—aided by human father and son duo Sparkplug and Spike Witwicky—attempt to protect the new world on which they find themselves. The miniseries concludes with the Decepticons believed dead after their space cruiser is sent plunging into the ocean depths, while the Autobots prepare to return to Cybertron.

=== Season 1 ===
The 13-episode first season, commissioned and produced before the pilot miniseries aired, was broadcast weekly between October and December on Saturday or Sunday mornings. Story-edited at Marvel Productions by Bryce Malek and Dick Robbins, the season begins with the revelation that the Decepticons have survived the events of the pilot and follows them as they set about constructing a "space bridge" to teleport resources back to Cybertron. A loose story arc centered on this technology spans the season, culminating in "The Ultimate Doom", a three-part episode in which the Decepticons teleport Cybertron itself into Earth's orbit. The paraplegic computer expert Chip Chase joins Spike and Sparkplug as a new human ally for the Autobots. The season also introduced several new characters from the upcoming 1985 product line in advance of their toys' release including Skyfire, the Dinobots, the Insecticons, and the first "combiner" team, the Constructicons, who are able to merge into a giant robot, Devastator, whose introduction was set alongside a climactic one-on-one duel between Optimus Prime and Megatron that served as a part of the season finale.

=== Season 2 ===
Forty-nine further episodes were commissioned for the show's second season in 1985, bringing the total up to the "magic number" of 65 required to move the series into weekday broadcast syndication. Compared to the first season, Season 2's stories are more episodic, with many of them able to air in whatever order networks chose. Episodes would often spotlight individual characters or groups of characters as a means of promoting their toys and later in the season, the lore of the series would be expanded on as the history of Cybertron and origin of Optimus Prime were discovered and significant cartoon-original characters like Alpha Trion and the first female Transformer characters were introduced. A new recurring human cast member was also added in the form of Spike's girlfriend Carly. Partway into the season, the remainder of the 1985 product line was introduced, mostly through the two-part episode "Dinobot Island." These new characters, like the first year cast, were largely derived from Takara's Diaclone and Micro Change lines, including new Autobot car and mini-vehicles and Decepticon jets and the giant Autobot sentinel Omega Supreme and Decepticon "Triple-Changers" Astrotrain and Blitzwing. To expand the line, however, Hasbro also licensed several toys from other companies, including Takara's Japanese competitor, Bandai. Legal complications that arose from incorporating the first of these, Skyfire, into the first season resulted in the character quickly being phased out early in Season 2 and meant that none of the other Bandai-derived characters featured in the series. Toward the end of the season, the first 1986 product was introduced into the series: the Aerialbots, Stunticons, Protectobots and Combaticons, four combiner teams based on an unmade Diaclone line that was aborted in Japan in favor of importing the Transformers toy line itself. To promote these new toys even further in Japanese markets, a single Japanese-exclusive episode, Transformers: Scramble City, was released direct-to-video in spring of 1986.

=== The Movie ===
The gap between seasons two and three was bridged by The Transformers: The Movie, which was released to theaters in the summer of 1986. Set 20 years after the second season, in the year 2005, the film featured the deaths of many characters, including Optimus Prime, clearing away all the discontinued products from the 1984 and 1985 toy lines and introducing a new cast of the characters designed for the film, who were then made into toys for the 1986 range. Young Autobot, Hot Rod, used the power of the Autobot Matrix of Leadership to become the new Autobot leader, Rodimus Prime, and defeated the world-eating robot planet, Unicron, who reforms Megatron into Galvatron, while Skywarp, Thundercracker, Shrapnel, Kickback, and Bombshell are reformed as Cyclonus, Scourge, and Scourge's army, known as the Sweeps.

=== Season 3 ===
Season 3 picks up where the movie leaves off, with the Autobots now in control of Cybertron once more, working to restore their homeworld and serving as peacemakers for worlds all across the galaxy. The Decepticons, meanwhile, are in exile on the ruined world of Chaar, led now by Galvatron. Interconnected episodes, running plot threads and small story arcs became more common in the series, including the return of Starscream (following his death in the movie) as a ghost, frequent battles between the giant Autobot and Decepticon cities of Metroplex and Trypticon and the threat to both sides posed by the alien Quintessons, introduced in the movie and revealed in the season's premiere miniseries "Five Faces of Darkness" to be the true creators of the Transformers. This season also saw the debut of three new combiners: the Predacons, the Terrorcons, and the Technobots. This season saw story-editing duties transfer from Marvel Productions to Sunbow, overseen by Flint Dille, Marv Wolfman and Steve Gerber. Animation for around half the season was provided by producer Nelson Shin's animation studio AKOM, creating a different "look" for the show that encompassed its opening sequence and commercial bumpers. The death of Optimus Prime proved a controversial move and did not sit well with the viewing audience, resulting in a letter-writing campaign that ultimately compelled Hasbro to resurrect the Autobot leader in a two-part season finale called "The Return of Optimus Prime", which aired in March 1987. Optimus Prime was revived with help from a Quintesson during the threat of the Hate Plague.

=== Season 4 ===
The fourth season, consisting of a three-part finale miniseries named "The Rebirth", was broadcast in November 1987. Written by regular series writer David Wise, the Autobots and Decepticons encounter the alien world of Nebulos, where they bond with the native Nebulans to become Headmasters and Targetmasters. The Nebulons led by the evil Lord Zarak were able to transform the animal Decepticons with Scourge and Cyclonus into Headmasters while some of their weapons were transformed into Targetmasters. While Lord Zarak was able to become the Headmaster to his creation Scorponok, Spike Witwicky was able to operate the Headmaster unit so that he can control Fortress Maximus to fight Scorponok. The miniseries concludes with the successful restoration of Cybertron, but the Decepticon threat not yet quashed as Galvatron and Lord Zarak argue over who will rule the galaxy upon their victory over the Autobots.

=== Later developments ===
The Transformers did not disappear from American airwaves, as a fifth season aired in 1988. It consisted of reruns of 15 episodes from the original series, along with The Transformers: The Movie edited into five episodes. This season featured a new title sequence using footage from previous episodes, the movie, and toy commercials as well as all new framing scenes featuring a human boy named Tommy Kennedy (portrayed by actor Jason Jansen) and a stop-motion/machine prop Optimus Prime puppet (operated by Sesame Street veteran Martin P. Robinson). From 1993 to 1995, select episodes of the series were rebroadcast under the title Transformers: Generation 2. The stories were presented as though they were historical recordings displayed by the "Cybernet Space Cube", which added computer-generated borders and scene-transitions to the original animation. The story was later continued in Transformers: Generation 2: Redux, a Botcon magazine that is set 22 years after the events of the final episode where the first generation of the Autobots led by Optimus Prime pursue Galvatron and Zarak into deep space and a new generation of Autobots and Decepticons are introduced.

== Supplemental sequences ==
Each of the first three seasons of the series featured its own tailored opening sequence, featuring completely original animation and a unique arrangement of the theme tune. Additionally, the third-season premiere "Five Faces of Darkness" had its own specialized opening, depicting events that occurred in the mini-series. The fourth season, however, did not feature any new animation in its opening sequence, instead combining footage from the third season opening and various clips of animation from 1987 toy commercials; likewise, the fifth season featured commercial animation mixed in with footage from The Transformers: The Movie. Both used the season three musical arrangement. The series featured a distinctive scene transition that saw the Autobot and Decepticon symbols "flipping" from one to the other, accompanied by a distinctive five-note refrain. This transition technique became a hallmark of the series, and was used throughout the entire four-year run. Commercial breaks were segued into and out of using commercial bumpers featuring brief eyecatch-styled original animation with a voice over by series narrator Victor Caroli. A set of five proposed public service announcements were created to be tagged onto the end of episodes from the second season of the series, re-using the scripts from similar PSAs created for sister series G.I. Joe: A Real American Hero, complete with the catchphrase "...and knowing is half the battle!" These were never actually aired on television, but eventually appeared as bonus features on various DVDs and video games. For the third season, episodes were tagged with "The Secret Files of Teletraan II", a series of short featurettes that used clips from the show and new narration from Caroli to provide histories for the Autobots, the Decepticons, the Quintessons, and other subjects.

== Japanese release ==
In Japan, the first two seasons of the show were collectively released as Fight! Super Robot Lifeform Transformers (戦え！超ロボット生命体トランスフォーマー), then rebranded as Transformers 2010 (トランスフォーマー2010) for Season 3, with all seasons aired on Nippon TV. Between seasons 2 and 3 a Japanese exclusive OVA was released in place of the movie entitled; Transformers: Scramble City, released in 1986, it showcases the four special teams (Aerialbots, Protectobots, Stunticons and Combaticons) as well as the two transforming cities of Metroplex and Trypticon. Following the conclusion of the third season, the Japanese opted not to import "The Rebirth", but instead created a series of new animated shows to continue the story, beginning with Transformers: The Headmasters in 1987, and continuing into Transformers: Super-God Masterforce in 1988, Transformers: Victory in 1989, and the single-episode direct-to-video OVA Transformers: Zone in 1990. Supplementary manga written by Masami Kaneda and illustrated by Ban Magami ran alongside each series in Kodansha's TV Magazine.

== Home media ==
Seasons 1–4 were released on Region 1 DVD by Rhino Entertainment Company / Kid Rhino Entertainment (under its Rhinomation classic animation entertainment brand) between April 23, 2002, and March 9, 2004. Due to missing 35mm film stock, some sections of the Rhino release use earlier incomplete animation, often introducing errors, such as mis-colored Decepticon jets, Skyfire colored like Skywarp, missing laser blasts, or a confusing sequence where Megatron, equipped with Skywarp's teleportation power, teleports but does not actually disappear. This version also added extra sound effects that were presented in the remixed 5.1 surround soundtrack and later remixed 2.0 stereo soundtrack, but not present in the original broadcast version.

In 2005, Rhino lost the rights to distribute Transformers, and the license was subsequently acquired by Sony Wonder (a division of Sony BMG), who announced in October 2006 that they would re-release the first season in 2007, with the other three presumably following. In June 2007, Sony BMG dissolved Sony Wonder and moved the label to Sony Pictures Home Entertainment, without releasing any DVD sets.

In May 2008, Hasbro re-acquired the rights to Sunbow's catalogue, including Transformers. In March 2009, Shout! Factory announced that they had acquired the license from Hasbro to release Transformers on DVD. They subsequently released The Complete First Season on June 16, 2009. Season Two Volume One was released on September 15, 2009. Season Two Volume Two was released on January 12, 2010. Seasons Three and Four were released together in one set on April 20, 2010. These releases corrected most of the newly introduced Rhino animation errors, but this was necessarily accomplished by using lower quality sources taken from the original broadcast masters. Rhino's added sound effects were discarded in favor of a sound mix more faithful to the original mono audio. On October 20, 2009, Shout! released the complete series in a box set. This set, dubbed Transformers: The Complete Series - The Matrix of Leadership Collector's Set, features all 98 remastered episodes along with all new bonus features.

DVD name	Ep. #	Release date
The Complete First Season: 25th Anniversary Edition	16	June 16, 2009
Season Two Volume One: 25th Anniversary Edition	28	September 15, 2009
Season Two Volume Two: 25th Anniversary Edition	21	January 12, 2010
Seasons Three and Four: 25th Anniversary Edition	33	April 20, 2010
Transformers: The Complete Series - The Matrix of Leadership Collector's Set	98	October 20, 2009

=== Digital streaming ===
All four seasons are currently available for streaming online on Amazon Prime Video, Tubi (as Transformers: Generation 1), Pluto TV (as Transformers: Original Series), Plex and The Roku Channel. However, the Rhino masters of the episodes are the versions used for streaming.

In 2021, Hasbro made the complete series available for streaming on YouTube via the Hasbro Pulse channel, which eventually expanded with the live broadcast feed of the third and fourth seasons in 2024.
