= Transformers: The Headmasters =

1987-1988 Japanese animated television series

- North American DVD cover, depicting Chromedome and Sixshot
- トランスフォーマー ザ★ヘッドマスターズ
- Genre: Adventure, mecha
- Created by: Masumi Kaneda
- Developed by: Keisuke Fujikawa
- Directed by: Katsutoshi Sasaki
- Music by: Katsunori Ishida
- Country of origin: Japan
- Original language: Japanese
- No. of episodes: 35

Production
- Producers: Hirohisa Satō; Kenji Yokoyama; Tatsuya Yoshida
- Production companies: Takara Co., Ltd.; Toei Animation

Original release
- Network: NNS (NTV)
- Release: July 3, 1987 – March 25, 1988

Related
- Light novel

Transformers: The Headmasters - Dream War
- Written by: Keisuke Fujikawa
- Illustrated by: Shoko Yoshinaka
- Published by: Kadokawa Shoten
- Imprint: Kadokawa Bunko
- Published: August 25, 1987
- Video game
- Developer: Takara
- Publisher: Takara
- Genre: Scrolling shooter
- Platform: Family Computer Disk System
- Released: August 28, 1987
- Manga
- Written by: Masumi Kaneda
- Illustrated by: Ban Magami
- Published by: Kodansha
- Magazine: TV Magazine
- Original run: August 1987 – March 1988
- Volumes: 1

Transformers: The Headmasters (トランスフォーマー ザ★ヘッドマスターズ) is a Japanese anime television series that is a part of the Transformers robot superhero franchise. It aired from July 3, 1987, to March 25, 1988, and its 17:00–17:30 timeslot was used to broadcast Mashin Hero Wataru at the end of its broadcast. It serves as the first sequel series to the Japanese dub of the original 1984 The Transformers cartoon series in the Generation 1 franchise, followed by Transformers: Super-God Masterforce.

== Development ==
Initially, Takara, the Japanese producers of the Transformers toyline, imported the American Transformers cartoon series from 1984 to 1987. When the series came to an end with the three-part miniseries "The Rebirth" in 1987, however, Takara decided to continue the series themselves, declining to import The Rebirth and instead creating a full-length 35-episode spin-off series, Transformers: The Headmasters (two additional clips episodes were produced after the fact for direct-to-video release). Supplanting The Rebirth's position in Japanese continuity, The Headmasters occurred one year after The Return of Optimus Prime, introducing the title characters to the Transformers universe in a different way. Whereas in Western fiction, the Headmasters result from the merging of a Transformer with an organic alien being from the planet Nebulos, the Headmasters of the Japanese series are a group of small Cybertronians who departed the planet millions of years ago and crash-landed on the inhospitable planet Master. To survive its harsh climate, a select few Cybertronians constructed larger bodies called "Transtectors", to which they connected as the heads.

== Story ==
Six years after the decisive battle against Unicron, a group of rebellious Headmasters led by Weirdwolf join with Galvatron's Decepticons in an attack on Cybertron. The Headmasters, led by Cerebros, return to their home planet to aid in its defense. The situation soon gets worse when it is revealed that Vector Sigma, the super-computer at the planet's heart, is destabilizing, and Optimus Prime again sacrifices his life to save Cybertron. This proves to be only delaying the inevitable, however, as a bomb attack instigated by Scorponok turns Cybertron into a burnt-out, inhospitable husk. Rodimus Prime departs to search for a new planet for the Transformers to live on, leaving Cerebros in command, operating from the planet Athenia. Meanwhile, Scorponok replaces Galvatron- who had vanished in the explosion- as Decepticon leader, constructing a personal Transtector and redubbing himself MegaZarak to battle Cerebros' own giant form, Fortress Maximus.

Although populated mainly with new characters, The Headmasters featured characters from all previous seasons, including new versions of Soundwave and Blaster, rebuilt after a duel destroyed them both as Soundblaster and Twincast. Human Daniel Witwicky and his young Autobot friend Wheelie also played major roles in the series, serving as the youthful characters for the audience to identify with. More new characters were introduced when Galvatron returned to leadership and the Decepticons embarked on a space voyage, ransacking planets in a chain of stories that introduced the Horrorcons, Autobot and Decepticon clones. Later, the Decepticon ninja six-changer Sixshot kills Ultra Magnus, and the Autobot Headmasters manage to destroy Galvatron, leaving Scorponok to become leader of the Decepticons again. When the Decepticons then return to Master, refugees from the planet are caught in a plasma bomb accident that fuses them to the arms of several Autobots and Decepticons, creating the Targetmasters, and in a final move, Scorponok attempts the destruction of Earth, only to be foiled, thanks in part to a traitorous Sixshot.

== Adaptations ==
Not professionally released in the United States until July 5, 2011, The Headmasters was dubbed into English in Hong Kong by the dubbing company Omni Productions, for broadcast on the Malaysian TV channel, RTM1, and later the Singapore satellite station, StarTV, where it attained greater fame, leading it to often be referred to (albeit erroneously) as the "StarTV dub". The dub is, however, infamous for its poor quality, full of mistranslations and incorrect names (for example, Saibertron is pronounced "Cyberton", Blaster becomes known as "Billy", Blurr is "Wally", Jazz is "Marshall", Hot Rod is "Rodimus" (pronounced "Roadimus"), the Matrix becomes the "Power Pack", Spike is "Sparkle", Soundblaster is "New Soundwave", Metroplex is called "Philip", and Fortress Maximus is occasionally called "Spaceship Bruce"), as well as stilted and even bizarre dialogue, such as "I'll send you express to hell!" and "Fortress Maximus has come himself". Also, Wheelie does not speak in rhyme (but seems to have a slight Scottish accent), the Dinobots speak normally (Grimlock does not say his famous "Me Grimlock" at all), Raiden is known as "Grimlock", and Blurr speaks abnormally slowly. Omni also dubbed the 1990s and 2000s Godzilla films and Riki-Oh: The Story of Ricky, both of which are often ridiculed for poor dubbing. This dub has seen some releases in the United Kingdom, when it aired on AnimeCentral from September 13, 2007. In 2005, the full series with the original Japanese audio with subtitles and the English dub were released over 4-discs on DVD in Region 2. The full series was released on DVD in North America by Shout! Factory on July 5, 2011, without the English dub. In 2008, Madman Entertainment released the series on DVD in Australia in Region 4, PAL format.

A novel based on this anime titled Transformers: The Headmasters - Dream War (トランスフォーマー ザ・ヘッドマスターズ 夢戦争) was written by Keisuke Fujikawa and released on August 25, 1987.

An eight-chapter manga adaptation of this anime was written by Masami Kaneda and illustrated by Ban Magami as part of their Fight! Super Robot Life Form Transformers: The Comics (戦え！超ロボット生命体トランスフォーマー ザ☆コミックス) series.

== Theme songs ==
- Openings
1. "The Headmasters" (ザ・ヘッドマスターズ)
  - July 3, 1987 - March 25, 1988
  - Lyricist: Keisuke Yamakawa / Composer: Takamune Negishi / Arranger: Katsunori Ishida / Singers: Hironobu Kageyama
  - Episodes: 1–38
- Endings
1. "You are a Transformer" (君はトランスフォーマー)
  - July 3, 1987 - March 25, 1988
  - Lyricist: Keisuke Yamakawa / Composer: Takamune Negishi / Arranger: Katsunori Ishida / Singers: Hironobu Kageyama
  - Episodes: 1–35, 38
- Insert Songs
1. "Stand Up! Headmaster Anger" (立て！怒りのヘッドマスター)
  - January 22, 1988, February 5, 1988, February 19, 1988, March 18, 1988
  - Lyricist: Shinobu Urakawa / Composer: Takamune Negishi / Arranger: Katsunori Ishida / Singers: Hironobu Kageyama
  - Episodes: 24, 26, 28, 32
2. "Destron Hymn" (デストロン讃歌)
  - February 12, 1988, February 26, 1988
  - Lyricist: Keisuke Yamakawa / Composer: Takamune Negishi / Arranger: Katsunori Ishida / Singers: Hironobu Kageyama
  - Episodes: 27, 29
3. "We are Headmasters" (僕等のヘッドマスター)
  - Lyricist: Keisuke Fujikawa / Composer: Takamune Negishi / Arranger: Katsunori Ishida / Singers: Korogi '73, Mori no Ki Jido Gassho-dan
  - Episodes: None
4. "TRANSFORM!"
  - Lyricist: Keisuke Yamakawa / Composer: Takeshi Ike / Arranger: Katsunori Ishida / Singers: Hironobu Kageyama
  - Episodes: None
5. "Coward Alliance" (臆病者同盟)
  - Lyricist: Keisuke Fujikawa / Composer: Takamune Negishi / Arranger: Katsunori Ishida / Singers: Hironobu Kageyama
  - Episodes: None
6. "Warrior Rest" (戦士の休息, Senshi no Kyūsoku)
  - Lyricist: Keisuke Yamakawa / Composer: Takamune Negishi / Arranger: Katsunori Ishida / Singers: Hironobu Kageyama
  - Episodes: None
7. "The Universe Has no Borders" (宇宙には国境がない)
  - Lyricist: Keisuke Fujikawa / Composer: Takamune Negishi / Arranger: Katsunori Ishida / Singers: Hironobu Kageyama
  - Episodes: None
8. "The Rainbow That Spans the Universe" (宇宙に架ける虹)
  - Lyricist: Keisuke Yamakawa / Composer: Takeshi Ike / Arranger: Katsunori Ishida / Singers: Hironobu Kageyama, Ikuko Noguchi
  - Episodes: None

== Episodes ==
No.	Title	Original release date
1	"Four Warriors Come Out of the Sky" (空から来た四人の戦士)	July 3, 1987
A full year after Optimus Prime's resurrection, Galvatron and the Decepticons attack both the planet Cybertron and Earth with the aid of four new members: the six-changing ninja officer Sixshot and the three Headmasters, Destrons whose heads can change into smaller robots in vehicle mode. These include the vampire-like Mindwipe, the gator-like Skullcruncher, and the wolf-like Weirdwolf. The Autobots have some new allies of their own, however; the Trainbots, six Autobots with train alternate modes. Ultra Magnus successfully repels Sixshot's attack, but on Cybertron, the Decepticons are winning, thanks to Wipe's hypnotic abilities putting most of the Autobots, including the Dinobots and Goldbug, to sleep. But then a mysterious starship appears and four Autobot Headmasters (Chromedome, Hardhead, Brainstorm, and Highbrow) emerge to join the battle. Meanwhile, Kup and Spike Witwicky learn that Vector Sigma, the core of Cybertron, has become unstable and is in danger of self-destructing.
2	"The Mystery of Planet Master" (マスター星の謎)	July 10, 1987
After driving the Decepticons off Cybertron, the Headmaster's leader, Fortress (Cerebros), explains that the Headmasters were once Autobots who fled Cybertron during the Great War and established a peaceful new life on the planet Master. After the group honed the ability to transform into heads so they could control larger bodies, Skullcruncher, Mindwipe, and Weirdwolf rebelled under a mysterious figure named Zarak, only to be exiled from Master and later ally with the Decepticons. Optimus leaves to go check on Vector Sigma, guided by the spirit of Alpha Trion. The Autobots launch a search for the Matrix of Leadership, as the reason Vector Sigma has become unstable is, according to Cerebros, that the Wisdom of the Ages originally contained within the Matrix was what kept Vector Sigma stable in the first place, but only Optimus knows where the Matrix is. Hot Rod, Blaster, his cassettes, and Superion head to the North Pole, where they are attacked by the Predacons, Menasor, Soundwave, and his cassettes. Blaster holds off Soundwave so Hot Rod can escape, and the two combatants end up killing each other in a fierce battle. As the Autobots on Athenia mourn for Blaster's death, Chromdedome takes the other Headmasters, save Cerebros, to Earth to aid Hot Rod in finding the Matrix.
3	"Birth of the Dream Double Prime" (夢のダブルコンボイ誕生)	July 17, 1987
While Cerebros follows Optimus to Vector Sigma, the other Autobot Headmasters join Hot Rod in finding the Matrix, while Galvatron launches an attack on Autobot City to stop the Autobots from obtaining it. Hot Rod eventually finds the Matrix in an energon storage facility, and after a failed attempt by Mindwipe to retrieve it, leaves for Cybertron with the Trainbots and Autobot Headmasters. At Vector Sigma, Optimus is ambushed by Cyclonus and Scourge, but rescued by Cerebros. Hot Rod and the other Autobot Headmasters arrive, followed by Galvatron and the Decepticon Headmasters. Alpha Trion merges with the Matrix in Hot Rod's hands, fully recharging it and transforming Hot Rod back into Rodimus Prime. After the two Primes drive off the Decepticons, Vector Sigma goes critical, and, despite Galvatron's attempt to kill him and Rodimus' own pleas, Optimus merges his spark with Vector Sigma, stabilizing it at the cost of his own life, leaving Rodimus in command of the Autobots once again.
4	"The Great Cassette Operation" (カセット大作戦)	July 24, 1987
Galvatron creates a weapon that emits electronic-disrupting rays called the "Madmachine". As another part of this plan, he uses technology provided by Zarak to resurrect Soundwave as a black version of himself called "Soundblaster", who controls the weapon with a sonic controller. After Metroplex is used as a test subject for the Madmachine, Galvatron sends the Madmachine to Cybertron with the intent of using it on Vector Sigma. Learning of the plan, Rodimus informs Daniel Witwicky and Blaster's old cassette bots that Blaster is being rebuilt using Master technology provided by Cerebros. Reborn as "Twincast", Blaster reunites with his cassette bots and leads them to Chaar, where the Decepticon's current base is, and destroys the sonic controller, causing the Madmachine to go haywire and allowing the Autobots to destroy it.
5	"Rebellion on Planet Beast" (ビースト星の反乱)	July 31, 1987
The Headmasters, Wheelie, and Daniel come across two Beastformers named Rabbit Kid and Hedgehog, who tell them that their home planet, Beast, has been taken over by the Decepticons. On Beast, a rebel group led by White Leo is battling against evil Beastformers led by Alligatron, who has sided with the Decepticons. Daniel and Wheelie met a young ape Beastformer, whose parents have been captured, along with most of the planet's inhabitants, and have been used as slaves by the Decepticons. The trio try to rescue the boy's parents, but are immediately spotted and chased after. The other Autobots, Monsterbots, and Beastformers show up soon afterwards, along with the Decepticon Headmasters. Cerebros enters the factory via a shortcut briefly covered by a piragilon swamp, while, inside the factory, the young ape Beastformer, Daniel, and Wheelie free the slaves and Galvatron is knocked into the swamp. Although the Autobots have won the day, Rodimus and Cerebros discover blueprints for a small component for an even larger machine the Decepticons hope to use.
6	"Approach of the Demon Meteorite" (悪魔の隕石接近)	August 7, 1987
Galvatron creates a metal-warping meteorite called "Metamorphose", with the intent of using it to destroy Athenia. The Autobot Headmasters attempt to stop the meteor, but discover that their blasters have no effect on it. Cyclonus is sent to attack other Autobot forces to distract them from Metamorphose. The Autobot Headmasters learn that destroying the meteorite with a non-metallic agent and with Spike recovering from a previous battle, Daniel volunteers to plant bombs onto the weapon. Despite the Decepticons' attempts to stop him, Daniel manages to successfully plant a bomb onto Metamorphose's gravity emitter and destroys it. Back on Athenia, he is hailed as a hero for his actions.
7	"The Four-Million-Year-Old Veil of Mystery" (四百万年・謎のベール)	August 28, 1987
Arcee reports an attack on the planet Praum, prompting the Autobot Headmasters to investigate. When the group arrives, they learn that everyone at the base is already dead. Meanwhile, on Earth, Rodimus and Ultra Magnus are investigating a possible new energy source. The two head to a base in Asia, only to find that the occupants have been slaughtered by the Decepticons. Upon finding the energy source data, Rodimus soon learns that Cerebros' team is walking into a trap on Praum, set by Scorponok. Back at the base on Praum, every one of the exits are sealed and the domed structure starts to spin, burying itself into the sand and pinning the Autobot Headmasters to the walls. Flashing back to how they had to survive the rugged and cruel terrains of the planet Master to transform into their head modes, the group escapes by switching Transectors to boost their powers. Rodimus and Galvatron's forces arrive and in the following struggle, the Decepticons are hurled into the sand trap themselves. Astrotrain manages to rescue his comrades and all the Decepticons retreat as the Autobots look on.
8	"Terror! The Six Shadows" (恐怖！六つの影)	September 4, 1987
During a trip to Japan, Wheelie, Daniel, and the Trainbots see a broadcast of a shadowy figure who demands the entirety of Japan's energy or else he will destroy the country. The Autobots are informed of this news as Rodimus heads to Earth with the Autobot Headmasters. The Decepticons also learn of the plan and Cyclonus and Scourge vow to steal the energy from the terrorist, despite a strange lack of interest in their plan from Galvatron and the Decepticon Headmasters. The Autobots soon learn that the United States, France, Canada, Great Britain, and the Soviet Union have also been threatened by a giant gun, a jet, an armored car, a winged wolf, and a tank. New York and London are attacked by the gun and the wolf respectively, and the Headmasters later see that Wheelie, Daniel, and the Trainbots were shopping in Japan at the time of the terrorists' unveiling and accuse them of not doing their jobs, sparking an argument. During which, Chromedome silences Daniel for trying to end the argument and he leaves the room. When Chromedome goes to apologize, he sees the boy playing with a toy ninja star he purchased while in Japan, and Daniel tells him about how ninjas can appear in various places at once. This stirs up memories from Master when a mysterious Cybertronian able to duplicate into six shapes came to the planet to steal energy and killed one of Chromedome's friends, named "Abel". When the terrorist attacks Tokyo, the Trainbots combine into the gestalt known as "Raiden" and fight its six forms. The terrorist reveals himself to be Sixshot and savagely attacks Raiden before the Autobot Headmasters, seeking to avenge Abel's death, beat Sixshot down and force him to retreat. The Trainbots and Autobot Headmasters reconcile while Galvatron, who was in on Sixshot's scheme the whole time, pummels Cyclonus and Scourge for interfering with the plan.
9 10	"Planet Cybertron Is in Grave Danger" (セイバートロン星危機一髪)	September 4, 1987
The Autobots and Decepticons learn that Vector Sigma is producing a new, powerful version of Cybertonium called "Cybertonuron". Galvatron sees this new alloy as a tool to help in finally gaining control over Cybertron, but Zarak believes that the risk is too great, given that there is no guarantee that the Cybertonuron will work, though Galvatron brushes off his concerns. An attack on Cybertron spearheaded by the Predacons causes Rodimus to spring to the planet's defense, calling Kup, Blurr, and Arcee away from the command center on Athenia as a backup unit. Cerebros, who is also uncertain of the Cybertonuron's dependability, tries to dissuade Rodimus from going, believing that the attack is all a trick. He tries to argue for a more peaceful solution, but Rodimus points out that Cybertron is more important than the Cybertonuron and that the Autobots must not allow the Decepticons to conquer or destroy the planet. On Cybertron, Rodimus faces Galvatron, but is defeated and buried beneath some rubble. Before Galvatron can finish his rival off, Soundblaster arrives and tells him that the Cybertonuron has been completed. Learning of this, Zarak, who was earlier informed by Sixshot that Galvatron would exile him once he had the Cybertonuron, preventing him from getting revenge on Cerebros, contacts Weirdwolf, Skullcruncher, and Mindwipe, ordering them to place bombs at Vector Sigma. Once the bombs explode, they will destroy Vector Sigma, and Cybertron along with it. As the battle for the Cybertonuron continues, the Autobot Headmasters become suspicious of the Decepticon Headmasters' sudden disappearance and go looking for them. Chromedome soon finds Skullcruncher and Weirdwolf guarding the entrance to Vector Sigma and contacts his teammates and informs them of his discovery. Chromedome then goes after Mindwipe after Brainstorm, Highbrow, and Hardhead arrive and hold off Weirdwolf and Skullcruncher. Mindwipe arrives at Vector Sigma and sets the bombs, telling Chromedome that they can't be removed. Highbrow, Brainstorm, and Hardhead arrive and see that Chromedome is trying to remove the bombs, ignoring what Mindwipe told him. Highbrow tells Chromedome that there is nothing they can do and must evacuate the citizens above. He reluctantly agrees. Meanwhile, Zarak informs Galvatron of the bombs he had his minions place at Vector Sigma and that the Decepticons must evacuate before they go off. Galvatron, angry that Zarak did this without him knowing, ignores Soundblaster's pleas and goes to defuse the bombs himself. Learning of what has happened, Rodimus relents and evacuates Cybertron with the other Autobots and Decepticons. Galvatron arrives at Vector Sigma, but before he can do anything, the bombs go off, destroying Cybertron. Galvatron is caught in the explosion and presumed dead. In the aftermath, Rodimus decides to abandon the war to find a new homeworld for the Autobots, leaving Cerebros in command. Kup, Blurr, and Arcee offer to accompany Rodimus, but Rodimus only denies Arcee, telling her to look after Daniel and Wheelie. Rodimus, Kup, and Blurr depart into space as the Autobots and Daniel look on in sadness.
11	"The Shadow Emperor Lord Zarak" (影の大帝ロード・ザラック)	September 18, 1987
Cerebros throws a party on Athenia to announce the joint Autobot-human construction of the solar-energy-gathering satellite, Sol 1. Meanwhile, on Chaar, Zarak lies to Cyclonus and Scourge that Galvatron is still alive, recovering from Cybertron's destruction, and has appointed him substitute commander in his place. Cyclonus and Scourge are unsure if they can trust Zarak, but Soundblaster tells the two that they have no choice but to follow him. Learning of Sol 1 from Ratbat and Soundblaster, Cyclonus and Scourge head to Earth with the Predacons and they all launch an attack on the satellite's launch site. Sol 1 is launched into orbit and immediately begins to collect energy, but Zarak sends the Decepticon Headmasters and Triple Changers to steal it. They are successful due to Sixshot keeping the other Autobots at bay. The Autobots track the satellite to a world named after Zarak, finding it heavily guarded by the Decepticons. As both sides fight, Sol 1 beams the energy stored down onto the planet, where a mysterious, giant, robotic body absorbs it. The Decepticons retreat and the Autobots are forced to destroy Sol 1 upon learning that it would be destroyed if they tried to move it back to Earth.
12	"The Dormant Volcano Mysteriously Erupts" (謎の休火山大噴火)	September 25, 1987
While the Autobots are trying to investigate planet Zarak, the Andes Mountains in Chile begin exhibiting strange seismic activities, leading to an eruption that threatens a local village. The Trainbots and Protectobots are dispatched to help out the civilians, and the former form Raiden in order to deal with the Predacons, who ambush them and form Predaking. The Protectobots go on ahead only to encounter the Decepticon Headmasters, and form Defensor only to be paralyzed by Mindwipe's weapon. Unable to risk leaving Autobot City unguarded, Ultra Magnus contacts Athenia, and Cerebros dispatches Chromedome and his team-accompanied by Wheelie and Daniel-to aid the beleaguered villagers and Raiden. Flying in Broadside, they arrive at the volcano only to be driven back by the volcanic ash. Changing course, they join the battle against Predaking and the Decepticon Headmasters and soon have them on the ropes, allowing the Trainbots to go to the rescue of the villagers. With the aid of an arriving Chromedome, they are able to save the humans-which includes young boy Pipirro, his sister Alyssa, their grandparents, and their donkey Koro-from the lava just before it consumes their home village. While the Autobots and humans are celebrating their successful rescue, the Decepticon Headmasters emerge and hold Pipirro and Koro hostage, demanding that Chromedome share the Autobot Headmasters' transformation techniques. However, Koro's mother then attacks the Decepticons, enabling the Autobots to free the captives and drive off their foes. The volcanic ordeal proves to be a plot by Scorponok, who wanted to distract the Autobots from his operations on planet Zarak.
13	"Head On!! Fortress Maximus" (ヘッドオン！！フォートレスマキシマス)	October 2, 1987
Scorponok's latest plan involves planting an alien seed on Earth and tricking Daniel into planting one on Athenia, with the seeds growing into monstrous carnivorous plants. The Autobots' efforts to deal with the plant on Earth are hampered by the Decepticons, while a guilt-ridden Daniel attempts to deal with the plant on Athenia in the absence of most of the Autobots. Left with no other options, Cerebros attempts to draw the mighty Master Sword from his control console, but is unable to do so until he is moved by the pleas of his fellow Headmasters engaged in battle below. The Master Sword's power allows Cerebros to merge with his battleship-in reality a massive Transtector-and become the giant warrior Fortress Maximus. Maximus makes short work of the plant on Earth, and its destruction triggers the demise of the one threatening Athenia. The Autobots and their human allies regroup, unaware that Scorponok already has a plan in motion to deal with Fortress Maximus.
14 15	"Explosion on Mars!!" (火星爆破！！)	October 9, 1987
The Decepticons embark on a new scheme to destroy Mars using energy they've collected from the destruction of Cybertron, with Scorponok secretly scheming to destroy Cerebros in the process. On Mars, Spike leads a survey team consisting of himself, Daniel, Wheelie, and the Trainbots, seeking information that may allow them to make Mars a life-sustaining planet or perhaps increase Earth's own capacity for sustaining life. An explosion at the south pole causes the group to split up and investigate, with Daniel, Wheelie, and Shouki discovering the Terrorcons. Receiving this news, Cerebros dispatches the Headmasters to Mars while instructing Ultra Magnus to deploy the Technobots from Earth; the latter are intercepted by Sixshot and Trypticon and prevented from leaving the planet despite Metroplex's aid. Back on Mars, Daniel's group is captured by the Terrorcons, but manage to escape after signalling the Headmasters, who have defeated Predaking. Learning of the Decepticons' plans, Cerebros makes his way to Mars and orders the Trainbots to take Spike, Daniel, and Wheelie back to Athenia. As the other Headmasters fall into a Decepticon ambush, it is revealed that Cerebros can only draw the master sword when his mental and physical energies are in balance, which he manages to accomplish after seeing his comrades in great peril. However, Scorponok is prepared, and has the Decepticon Headmasters blast Cerebros as he emerges from his ship with the Master Sword. Cerebros' ship is left immobile at the base of a crater, with Highbrow and Brainstorm left badly damaged and Cerebros unable to form Fortress Maximus due to the Decepticon attack of the previous episode. The Decepticons' plans to destroy mars and harvest the resulting plasma energy proceed, with Scorponok eagerly anticipating the destruction of his hated foes. However, Chromedome and Hardhead soon detect one of the Decepticons planting a bomb, and fly off to engage only to run into the Decepticon Headmasters, prompting Cerebros to summon the Trainbots back to Mars. They arrive just in time to aid the outnumbered Headmasters, forming Raiden and prompting Scorponok to recall his minions. Concerned by this, Cerebros contacts Ultra Magnus, who dispatches Twincast and his Deployers to the Decepticons' Earth base in search of answers. While he engages Thrust and Dirge, Rewind learns that the Decepticons have been recalled to Chaar, and Twincast soon follows Sixshot through the Space Bridge. On Chaar, the Decepticon leaders witness the emergence of Scorponok's massive Transtector from planet Zarak, unaware that Twincast is also observing. Scorponok, his appearance revealed for the first time, transforms the Transtector into its scorpion form and sets off for Chaar, where Soundwave discovers Twincast and engages him a in a duel. Twincast escapes and reports to Cerebros, who prepares himself for an inevitable confronation with Scorponok while the Headmasters and Raiden engage the Terrorcons, who form Abominus. Scorponok then takes off for Mars, while Brainstorm and Highbrow rejoin the battle just in time to witness Scorponok's arrival; the massive Transtector easily overwhelms both Headmasters and Trainbots. Scorponok then transforms his vessel into a giant robot and begins attacking the powerless Cerebros' battleship, while ordering his forces to detonate the explosives that will destroy Mars. The Decepticons depart, but Fortress Maximus absorbs some the energy from the explosives, recharging its own power cells and enabling it to transform and confront Scorponok, who retreats at this unexpected turn of events.
16	"Return of the Immortal Emperor" (帰って来た不死身の帝王)	October 20, 1987
The Autobots, having investigated the blasted ruins of Mars, determine that the situation is rapidly deteriorating, and fear what could happen if the Decepticons destroy another planet. A mysterious object is then sighted on Athenia, while Chromedome and Hardhead depart Battleship Maximus without authorization. Scorponok is alerted to this by Counterpunch, while Soundblaster's Cassettes observe as well, and promptly boards his Transtector to deal with the would be invaders. The two Headmasters are soon caught by Scorponok and Blitzwing, and the former dispatches the Decepticon Headmasters to attack as well. Fortunately, Battleship Maximus arrives in time to save the pair from drifting endlessly through space, and then squares off with Scorponok while the Decepticon Cassettes report to Soundblaster, who sets off for Earth. The two giant Transtectors battle in space, when the UFO from Athenia appears and scares off Scorponok, allowing Battleship Maximus to flee. The object then travels to Earth, where it appears before Soundblaster and Sixshot and then abducts the latter. The Autobots then contemplate its mysterious nature, while the Decepticons prepare to crown Scorponok as their new leader, while Cerebros is informed of their movements by Punch. The Decepticons gather on the moon for the coronation, only for Fortress Maximus to arrive with the Headmasters, Aerialbots, Protectobots, Trainbots, and Protectobots and engage the Decepticons. The UFO reappears in the midst of the battle and begins attacking the Autobots, before being revealed as an alien ship that produces the long-missing Galvatron, whose appearance turns the tide against the Autobots. Galvatron reveals that he wished to see how his forces fared in his absence, and soon reclaims his throne as leader of the Decepticons.
17	"Planet Sandra SOS" (惑星サンドラSOS)	October 27, 1987
On Chaar, the Decepticons pick up a distress signal from a mysterious planet called Sandra that is rapidly being depleted of energy, and Galvatron decides to have the Autobots monitored to see how they respond. The Autobots determine that Sandra is part of a solar system that is a twin to Earth's, and that Sandra itself possesses a similar environment. Though the Autobots are eager to help the people of Sandra, Spike is cautious given Earth's own limited energy resources. Punch then informs Cerebros of the Decepticons reception of the same signal, while the Autobots and their human allies quickly prepare to send the Sandrans what energy they can afford to spare. Ratbat, having observed this, informs Galvatron, who becomes outraged at the idea of Earth's energy-which he perceives as his own-being given to others and travels to Earth where he confers with Sixshot. The Trainbots are loaded with Enerogn cubs for the voyage to Sandra, while the Autobots are informed by Twincast of Galvatron's arrival; Galvatron's forces then attack, with Computron and Abominus facing off along with Devastator and Defensor while the Trainbots attempt to depart in the midst of Sixshot's attack. Cerebros decides to try moving Athenia's Energon cubes as a means of diverting Galvatron's attention; deducing their tactics, Galvatron orders Scorponok to intercept Battleship Maximus. The two Headmaster forces soon clash, but Chromedome, Hardhead, Wheelie, Spike, and Daniel escape in a smaller ship in order to take the Energon to Sandra. Battleship Maximus follows after driving off Scorponok, while the rescue party arrives to find Sandra a desolate, desert-covered world depleted by its civilization's wastefulness, but with the citizens hopeful that they can find alternative sources with enough time. Galvatron and Scorponok then attack Battleship Maximus, but Chromedome and Hardhead soon sabotage Scorponok in their smaller robot modes and then join their comrades in attacking Galvatron and the Decepticon Headmasters. The enemy are soon driven off, and the Autobots and humans depart their new friends glad to have done what little they could to help.
18	"Daniel's Biggest Pinch Ever!!" (ダニエル史上最大のピンチ！！)	December 4, 1987
On Chaar, the Decepticons detect a pair of incoming craft and attack, but are surprised when the newcomers are revealed to be Decepticons: the Horrorcons Snapdragon and Apeface, there at Galvatron's invitation. Punch, in the form of Counterpunch, detects this and sends word to the Autobots, with the Headmasters recognizing former comrades from Planet Master. To the astonishment of the Autobots, Spike then proposes opening up negotiations with the Decepticons as a means of preventing further destruction such as that of Cybertron and Mars, which has upset the balance of the universe. Cerebros is persuaded by Spike's argument, and agrees to let him try to reason with Galvatron; however, Galvatron is disgusted by the idea of working with the Autobots and humans until Scorponok proposes using the negotiation meeting as cover for an attack. Galvatron sends a reply and agrees to meet with Spike, on the condition that Spike bring Carly and Daniel with him; the Headmasters insist on coming along as escorts, promising not to interfere with Spike's mission as a neutral negotiator. While in transit to Earth, the Trainbots suffer the affects that the Space Bridge has suffered from the destruction of Mars and Earth; Galvatron soon arrives at the meeting place on Shangri-La Island and demands that Carly and Daniel be held as hostages until the negotiations are over. Spike and the Headmasters reluctantly agree and begin the talks, but things soon break down as Galvatron proves unwilling to cooperate with the Autobots and attacks Spike's neutral position given his current residence on Athenia, and then gives Spike an ultimatum: leave Daniel on Earth as proof of his sincerity. Spike informs his son of the difficulty, and a tearful Daniel agrees, with Carly volunteering to return to Earth as well. On Chaar, Counterpunch learns of Galvatron's true intentions, and further that the Galvatron negotiating with Spike is an impostor while the real one is planning to strike and claim all the universe's energy. Learning of this, the Trainbots distract the Decepticons on the island to enable the Headmasters while Chromedome confronts the false Galvatron, who is revealed to be Sixshot, and his teammates rescue Carly and Daniel. Sixshot, the Headmasters, Horrorcons, and Trainbots soon engage in battle, with the Decepticons being driven off and fleeing through the Space Bridge, which they destroy behind them to prevent Autobot pursuit. The Autobot Space Bridges between Earth and Athenia are destroyed as well, while the Decepticons depart Chaar in Scorponok. The Autobots soon set off into space in pursuit, leaving Ultra Magnus and Spike to oversee the Autobot-human alliance.
19	"Fight to the Death on Planet Bee Hive!!" (蜂の巣惑星を死守せよ！！)	December 11, 1987
The Decepticons' quest for the energy of planets across space leads them towards the peaceful planet Beehive, a world inhabited by humanoid aliens with bee-like characteristics. After all but destroying a Beehive ship on the way they attack the planet itself, facing off with the brave but underpowered Beehive defenses. The Autobots come across the wrecked ship in space and rescue the sole surviving crew member, who dies after giving Chromedome a medal to deliver to his young son Makku. The Beehive fleet, recalled home due to the Decepticon attack, attack Fortress Maximus believing the Autobots to be on the same side as the Decepticons, and Cerebros refuses to fire back and risk harming them. Chromedome departs for the planet alone and finds Makku, and after delivering the medal and the tragic news of his father's passing is led to the palace, where he convinces the queen of the Autobots' good intentions. He then challenges Galvatron's forces outside the palace but is defeated and knocked into a sea of energy collected by the people of Beehive, some of which Makku helps him absorb so that he can return to the battle. The Autobots are successful in driving off the Decepticons, and continue to pursue them through space.
20	"Battle for Defense of the False Planet" (見せかけ星の攻防戦)	December 18, 1987
The Decepticons arrive in the planetary system of Twin Star, where two planets-one a mechanized paradise and the other a seemingly barren desert-orbit close to one another. The Decepticons quickly attack in search of the inhabited planet's energy resources, while the pursuing Autobots bicker as Chromedome seeks a more aggressive stance against the Decepticons. This opinion leads to a disagreement with Brainstorm, who volunteers to accompany Arcee, Wheelie, and Daniel to the desert planet where they will be safe during the ensuing battle between the two forces of Transformers. Scorponok questions why they are continuing to pursue energy instead of a grander plan, to which the others Decepticons reply that they are seeking energy for the plan. The inhabitants of the planet begin evacuating, leaving their defenses on automatic while the Autobot and Decepticon forces clash, and are revealed to have constructed a hidden refuge underneath the surface of the desert planet where their energy is safely stored. Alerted to this by Brainstorm, the Autobots press their attack while the Decepticons' search for energy comes up empty, and they ignore the desert planet as it separates from the tether connecting it to the city planet carrying the people to safety. The Decepticons soon depart in search of other energy sources, while the Autobots are reconciled and continue their pursuit.
21	"Find Scorponok's Weak Spot!!" (スコルポノックの弱点をあばけ！！)	December 18, 1987
The Autobots receive a distress signal from Daros, a planet that the Decepticons have attacked, and find them slaughtering the inmates at a penal colony. Several of the inmates are rescued and then abducted Daniel, but after he is freed they reveal that they are political prisoners whose leaders have allied with the Decepticons. The distress signal is revealed to have come from Tekna, a Beastformer who was one of the slave laborers on the Scorponok Transtector. The Autobots eventually find him in a tunnel, only for him to be mortally wounded by the Decepticon Headmasters. Scorponok and Fortress Maximus transform into robot modes and battle, but Galvatron orders a retreat based on Scorponok's over-consumption of Energon. The former ruling elite are then overthrown, and Tekna dies but is able to give the Autobots a microfilm containing a key secret: a weak spot on Scorponok.
22	"Head Formation of Friendship" (友情のヘッドフォーメーション)	December 18, 1987
The Decepticons attack the planet Paradise and while Battleship Maximus has answered their call for help, they cannot undertake the mission just yet as the ship needed repairs. Twincast, Highbrow and the trainbots takeover where they meet one of the natives: a girl named Papika who can understand animal-language and from her discover where the Decepticons are currently set up, but Mindwipe attacks and captures Highbrow. Battleship Maximus later arrives at Papika's village and Daniel falls head-over-heels for Papika, all the while Twincast had found Highbrow, however Sixshot attacks and sends the surrounding jungle aflame. While Battleship Maximus keeps the natives safe the remaining headmasters go rescue Highbrow, who is bound in chains beneath a waterfall by the Decepticons. Discouragement by Ratbat using a recording of Galvatron had little effect, and the heroes are backed-up by the Monsterbots, Technobots and Trainbots. Highbrow is freed by the squad's Head Formation, and the beaten Decepticons flee on Scorponok.
23	"Mystery of the Space Pirate Ship" (宇宙海賊船の謎)	December 25, 1987
The Decepticons' route takes them to the Pirate Planet, once home to Space Pirates who plundered nearby solar systems for their energy. The Decepticon Clones Pounce and Wingspan intercept the Autobot Clones, who possess half of a skull that will lead to the Pirates' hidden energy stockpile. Failing to secure it, they are ordered to hand over their own half of the skull to Galvatron and secure the other half with help from the Horrorcons. The Autobots in pursuit stumble across a ship graveyard in space, with an ancient space galleon that's putting off a strange signal. Finding the Autobot Clones, the Autobots learn that they and the Decepticon Clones were once friends, until they went their separate ways and the Decepticon Clones fell in with Galvatron. Galvatron unites the halves of the skull and discovers a map to the energy stash, but soon loses it to the Autobots, with Highbrow raising an ancient pyramid from the depths of the planet. The Decepticons then attack, only to find that the door cannot be opened; Highbrow quickly deduces that the key needed to open it is on the space galleon. The Autobots recover it despite Sounblaster's interference, and are successful in opening the pyramid and driving off the Decepticons. After discovering that the energy cache is gone-apparently having wiped out all life on the planet due to being mishandled-the Autobots determine that the Decepticons are returning to Charr.
24	"Ultra Magnus Dies!!" (ウルトラマグナス死す！！)	January 22, 1988
The Decepticon Headmasters launch a brutal nighttime raid on an Autobot energy plant on Earth, as part of a larger plan orchestrated by Scorponok. Galvatron reveals his intentions to make the Earth a part of his own body; when Sixshot questions his trusting Scorponok with this information, Galvatron responds that he's aware of Scorponok's treachery and intends to deal with him. The Autobots return to Athenia, where Highbrow continues his efforts to crack the code that will unlock Scorponok's weakness. On Earth, Sixshot orders the Decepticons to launch a massive attack on an Autobot installation, which draws the Technobots and others into a battle while Sixshot goes after Ultra Magnus to avenge his previous loss to the Autobot City Commander. Magnus is initially unwilling to alert Cerebros of the situation, but after Sixshot and Trypticon appear and engage him and Metroplex he relents and orders the Trainbots to contact Athenia. Battleship Maximus flies to Earth, unaware that Scorponok has already reached the planet and that the Decepticon Headmaster leader has his own plans in motion. After enduring a brutal assault from Sixshot's varied modes and his ninja techniques, Ultra Magnus falls before the onslaught of Wingwolf, Sixshot's secret seventh mode. The Autobot Headmasters drive off Sixshot in a rage, and the Autobots then lay their fallen comrade to rest on Earth, feeling it to be fitting for an Autobot who gave his life to protect the planet.
25	"The Emperor of Destruction Vanishes on an Iceberg" (氷山に消えた破壊大帝)	January 29, 1988
In the wake of Ultra Magnus' death, the Decepticons continue to attack Autobot installations on Earth. Punch/Counterpunch, spying on Galvatron, learns of his intention to transform Earth into his new body and Scorponok's plans to destroy the planet. Galvatron adds that he will need components from his minions to create his new form, and Sixshot is quietly outraged to discover that he will be the first warrior "sacrificed" for Galvatron's ambitions. Twincast locates the Decepticon Headmasters on Earth near the Arctic, and Battleship Maximus and Metroplex arrive in time to challenge them and the incoming Galvatron and Sixshot. The Autobot Headmasters eventually use their head combination to entomb Galvatron in an iceberg, apparently finishing the Decepticon leader.
26	"I Risk My Life for Earth" (地球に賭けるこの命)	February 5, 1988
With Galvatron defeated, Scorponok takes over as new leader of the Decepticons, proclaiming himself Emperor of Terror. Continuing his schemes to destroy the Earth, he is unaware that the Autobots are continuing to seek the weak point in his massive Transtector, though progress remains slow. Sixshot's forces attack Earth under Scorponok's orders, and during his attack on Autobot City Spike is grievously wounded. Chromedome, obsessed with avenging Ultra Magnus' death, is suspended from duty when the other Headmasters depart to face the Decepticons, with Cerebros feeling that he can't be counted on in his emotional state. After overhearing Spike speaking with Daniel, Chromedome realizes he has been in error. After using his telekinesis to destroy a piece of shrapnel preventing Spike's full recovery, Cerebros departs to lead the Autobots against Scorponok's forces, but is initially unable to transform into Fortress Maximus due to his diminished strength. Chromeone, Wheelie, and Daniel pick up Highbrow's research into Scorponok's weakness, and eventually determine that the Transtector's weakpoint is located behind the Decepticon insignia on its chest. They inform Cerebros, who pierces the symbol with the Master Sword while in Fortress Maximus form, forcing a wounded Scorponok to retreat.
27 28	"Miracle Warriors Targetmasters" (奇跡の戦士ターゲットマスター)	February 12, 1988
With the Decepticons apparently gone from Earth in the wake of Scorponok's recent defeat, the Autobots and humans turn their attention towards rebuilding and recovering. While the Headmasters search for Scorponok's bombs to insure that they don't go off and destroy the planet, Spike employs Raiden, Superion, and Defensor to destroy the Decepticon Earth base. Wheelie is then stunned when his former guardians and elite Autobots Sureshot, Pointblank, and Crosshairs appear on Earth, eager to help with rebuilding efforts but quickly clashing with the less-experienced Headmasters. One of the Decepticon explosives is accidentally activated while it is being removed, forcing the Autobots to take them all into space aboard Battleship Maximus. While aboard they encounter a vessel carrying six refugees from Planet Master being pursued by old enemies of Pointblank's team, the Decepticons Slugslinger, Triggerhappy, and Misfire. The small Transformers from Master soon volunteer to take the explosives aboard their own ship while the Autobots and Decepticons clash, but both they and the rival teams of warriors are caught in the resulting plasma explosion. After Battleship Maximus escapes the explosion unscathed, and Sureshot's team is recovered with a startling alteration: three of the refugees from Master have become fused to their wrists. Surgery soon restores them to normal but leaves them with the ability to form firearms for the three, and the Targetmasters are thus born; unbeknownst to the Autobots, the other three refugees have similarly bonded to Slugslinger's team. Having learned that the Decepticons have invaded Planet Master, the Autobots travel there and force them to retreat, after which Chromedome reunites with Jack, a friend of him and Sixshot's late victim Abel. Jack is wounded and initially hesitant to speak with his old friend, and it turns out that he underwent Headmaster training with Jack and Chromedome but was unable to accomplish it, though he has since become a respected scientist. The two friends are soon reconciled, but the Decepticons make use of this by having Sixshot use his ninja trickery to impersonate Chromedome and kidnap Jack to interrogate him about Cerebros' Master Sword. After learning all they can from him, the Decepticons equip him with weapons, plant a bomb in his chest, and have Mindwipe hypnotize him to board Battleship Maximus so that they can destroy it. The Autobots soon realize what is afoot and attempt to stop Jack, and it falls to Chromedome to halt his former friend. He fires a shot that leaves Jack wounded, and it shakes Jack free long enough to warn the Autobots about the Decepticons' new knowledge before the bomb explodes and kills him. Following a battle with the Decepticons, the Headmasters and Targetmasters make peace, and a grieving Chromedome is consoled by Daniel and Wheelie while Pointblank comments on his potential as a warrior to Cerebros.
29	"The Master Sword is in Danger!!" (危うしマスターソード！！)	February 26, 1988
As the Autobots discuss his whereabouts, Scorponok becomes determined to unlock the power of G-Metal, a substance that he believes is the key to defeating Cerebros' Master Sword. Meanwhile, Wheelie reasons that he can learn to become a Headmaster since they're on the planet where Chromedome and the others learned to do it, only to wind up captured by Sixshot while he's out training alone and held for ransom so the Decepticons can learn the secret to the Master Sword. Chromedome and Daniel soon decide to leave alone to rescue their friend, while Cerebros-unaware of their plans-plans to surrender the secret of the sword to save Wheelie's life despite the objections of his subordinates. However, the rescue mission is successful, and a battle quickly ensues between the two enemy forces, with Scorponok unleashing his new Duocons during the battle. With their help, the Decepticons succeed in stealing the disk containing the Master Sword's secret, and Scorponok anticipates being able to destroy his hated foe at last.
30	"Zarak Shield Warfare" (ザラックシールド攻防戦)	March 4, 1988
The Decepticons leave a false trail in space in an effort to convince the Autobots that they won't be returning to Planet Master; but the Autobots soon see through the ruse due to the G-Metal's unique existence on Planet Master and its necessity in a weapon to defeat the Master Sword. Soundblaster discovers this after sneaking aboard Battleship Maximus and then flees after he is discovered; the Autobots then prepare a plan to use Scorponok's scheme to increase the Master Sword's power. The Autobot Targetmasters pursue him to Master's surface only to be attacked by their Decepticon counterparts, while the other Decepticons continue their efforts to create a more powerful version of Scorponok's Zarak Shield. The Decepticons soon hatch a plan to lure Cerebros' forces away from their hideout to give them time to complete the shield, unaware that Pointblank's team has survived. The trio and their Targetmasters soon stumble upon Scorponok's hideout while the Autobots aboard Battleship Maximus zero in by scanning for the energy required to make the shield. Weirdwolf, tired of luring the Autobots around, plants explosives on Battleship Maximus before drawing attention to himself as a distraction. As the Autobot Headmasters draw nearer, the Targetmasters find Scorponok's base and send their companions inside; the former are then intercepted by the Decepticon Targetmasters, only for their allies to come to their rescue. Fearing for his weapon, Scorponok gathers his forces and flees with the Zarak Shield, and the Autobot efforts to impede their escape are thwarted by Weirdwolf's bombs, which distract but do not badly damage the Autobots.
31	"Decepticons Annihilation Strategy" (デストロン全滅作戦)	March 11, 1988
With the Decepticons still hiding on Planet Master, the Autobots are divided about whether to confront them on the planet or drive them into space to battle there. Determined to end the fight on Master, Chromedome leads his fellow Headmasters to an outpost where the defenders of Planet Master, under the leadership of a Transformer named Kirk, are preparing for a final strike against the Decepticons. Spotting the Autobot Targetmasters approaching their cavern, the Decepticons attack to drive them off, and spot a Master surveillance plane during the fighting. Scorponok has his Transtector emerge in the city center, leading to a battle that the defenders of Master move to a nearby canyon. The defenders suffer heavy casualties, and Chromedome is forced to pull his friends back while Fortress Maximus' Master Sword is deflected by the Zarak Shield. Pointblank then blames the loss on Chromedome, who apologizes to Kirk, but Kirk reminds Chromedome that he agreed with Chromedome's plan. The Decepticons flee into space, destination: Earth.
32	"My Friend Sixshot!" (わが友シックスショット！)	March 18, 1988
As the Decepticons aboard Scorponok's Transtector head back towards Earth, they run into an asteroid field, and despite Sixshot's recommendations Scorponok orders them to plow right through rather than going around. Cerebros chooses to take Battleship Maximus around instead, which allows them to intercept the Decepticons and attack them. In the ensuing battle both Sixshot, who was sent out to attack the Autobots in space, and Daniel, who snuck into one of the battleship's laser ports prior to the conflict, are drawn into a vortex-like stream of asteroids, which ends up dumping them on the planet Daira. This world proves to be a living organism that consumes the detritus of space, which is fed to it by a race of creatures made from living stone. Sixshot runs across Daniel and surprises the youngster by not harming him and further by protecting him from the rock people. The Autobots soon arrive in search of Daniel, and their efforts enable Sixshot to depart the planet as well.
33	"Asteroid Duel" (アステロイドの決闘)	March 25, 1988
The Decepticons and Autobots arrive in the Asteroid belt, with Sixshot rejoining the Decepticon forces and then joining his fellows in battling the Autobots. During the conflict Sixshot challenges Chromedome to meet him later for a one-on-one duel, which Chromedome accepts in honor of the comrades Sixshot has had a hand in the deaths of: Abel, Ultra Magnus, and Jack. Cerebros forbids Chromedome from taking part, but Chromdome refuses to be swayed and Pointblank allows him to depart after seeing that he won't be persuaded otherwise, though he warns that he'll be expelled from the Autobots. Chromedome departs but is then pursued by Daniel, who is eager to prevent the battle given his friendship with Chromedome and Sixshot's efforts to protect him in the previous episode. Pointblank soon goes after him while the others pursue Scorponok, and arrives just in time to witness the asteroid on which the duel took place be consumed by an explosion rigged by the Duocons on Scorponok's orders. Chromedome and his friends return to the Autobots, and they set off to catch Scorponok and finish the conflict once and for all.
34 35	"The Final Showdown on Earth" (最後の地球大決戦)	March 25, 1988
As Battleship Maximus makes its way back to Earth, the Decepticons left behind on Earth by Scorponok begin terrorizing the planet, attacking a cruise ship and launching a satellite into orbit. Mysterious "Death Towers" then emerge from beneath Earth's surface in Australia and South America, with the Protectobots and Throttlebots traveling to investigate only to be engaged by Bruticus and Predaking, who prove too much for them. Pointblank and the Targetmasters investigate the South America tower while the Headmasters go to the aid of Spike and Carly, who were flying to the South America site when energy emissions from the tower forced them to land. After an injured Carly is rescued, the Autobots determine that the towers are made of a rare metal from the lost continent of Lemuria, while Sixshot-who rode on the exterior of Battleship Maximus back to Earth-sets his sights on avenging his betrayal at Scorponok's hands. Meanwhile, Sixshot locates a Decepticon operation at one of the pyramids of Egypt, where another Death Tower soon emerges prior to the Autobots arriving to challenge Scorponok's forces. Fortress Maximus engages Scorponok but is stunned by energy from the Death Tower, allowing the Decepticons to escape and alert the Autobots of their intentions to mass at the North Pole. Sixshot tracks Scorponok to Lemuria, where he learns of Scorponok's plans and then parts ways with the Decepticons forever, while the Autobots amass all their forces and head for the North Pole, where they find the Decepticons-minus Trypticon-waiting for them. A massive battle then ensues, but Fortress Maximus is caught in Scorponok's trap: caught in an energy stream drawn from the Earth's core through the Death Towers, he is left immobilized as the energies build to Earth's destruction while the Decepticons flee the planet. The Headmasters unite in Head Formation in an effort to free him, but are only successful when the other Autobots and Daniel join them in the Final Formation. Fortress Maximus then uses the power they've provided to break the energy stream and destroy Scorponok's Transtector and Zarak Shield, which he left behind in fleeing Earth. With the Decepticons' plans thwarted and their forces gone from Earth, the Autobots depart Earth as well, promising to one day return.

== Video game ==
Cover art

A video game based on the series was released by Takara in 1987 for the Family Computer Disk System (FDS). It has single-player and multiplayer modes, and it uses a floppy disk for the save game feature.

Players control one of the Autobot Headmasters through four planets – Earth, Cybertron, Master, and Chaar fighting the Decepticons. Unlike its predecessor, Mystery of Convoy, players cannot switch between robot and vehicle mode, as they are predetermined by level. Players also cannot choose which Autobot player character to use. Players must collect them throughout the game, because they will be flown in by helicopter and will replace that Autobot when they die.

Preceded by Fight! Super Robot Life-Form Transformers 2010 (11/14/1986 - 6/26/1987)	Nippon TV Friday 17:00-17:30 Timeframe; Transformers: The Headmasters (July 3, 1987 - March 28, 1988)	Succeeded by Mashin Eiyuden Wataru (4/15/1988 - 3/31/1989)
