= Griffin-Bacal Advertising =

Former advertising agency

- Industry: Advertising
- Founded: 1978; 48 years ago
- Founder: Tom Griffin and Joe Bacal
- Defunct: 2001; 25 years ago
- Fate: Merged by Omnicom with Moss/Dragoti
- Headquarters: New York City
- Key people: Tom Griffin and Joe Bacal
- Parent: DDB Worldwide (1994–2001)
- Subsidiaries: Sunbow Productions (1980–1998)

Griffin-Bacal Advertising was a global advertising agency founded in 1978 by Tom Griffin and Joe Bacal. One of their first clients was Hasbro, which employed their services for coming up with advertising campaigns for several of their toy lines such as G.I. Joe: A Real American Hero and Transformers. At the company's peak, it was the 67th largest advertising company in the world.

In 1994, Griffin-Bacal was bought by DDB Worldwide, but Hasbro ceased employing their services in 2000. This resulted in Griffin-Bacal laying off two thirds of staff. Following these events and the retirement of Tom Griffin and Joe Bacal, DDB's parent company Omnicom decided to merge Griffin-Bacal with Moss/Dragoti in 2001.

Griffin-Bacal's co-founder Joe Bacal died in Manhattan, New York City on October 24, 2019, at the age of 85.
