= Ultra Magnus =

Transformers character

- Transformers character
- First appearance: Transformers: Scramble City
- Based on: Power Convoy by Takara
- Voiced by: Robert Stack, Jack Angel, Show Hayami, others

In-universe information
- Affiliation: Autobot
- Family: Optimus Prime

Ultra Magnus is a character from the Transformers franchise. In the Transformers universe, he serves as a trusted lieutenant of Optimus Prime and was chosen as the leader of the Autobots after Optimus Prime's death in The Transformers: The Movie, though he ultimately passes his leadership role on to the young Autobot Hot Rod. In some continuities, Ultra Magnus is the brother of Optimus Prime.

== History ==
The toy that became known as Ultra Magnus was originally part of the Japanese Diaclone toy series produced by Takara. The original toy was known as Power Convoy.

Ultra Magnus first appears in Transformers: Scramble City, a Japan-exclusive anime that depicts him arriving on Earth. His first appearance in western media was in The Transformers: The Movie. In this film, he leads the defense of Autobot City against a Decepticon attack. When Optimus Prime and Megatron kill each other in battle, Optimus grants Ultra Magnus the Matrix of Leadership, (Note: The Matrix of Leadership is a mystical Autobot artefact that, according to Ron Friedman, is "the cybernetic, philosophical, physical and mystical core of Autobot leadership itself – the godhead".) making him the new leader of the Autobots. Ultra Magnus travels to the Junk Planet to fight Galvatron, the revived form of Megatron, and is killed in the battle before being revived by the Junkions, the Transformers that live on the Junk Planet. The young Autobot Hot Rod ultimately defeats Galvatron and his master Unicron, taking back the Matrix of Leadership and earning the name Rodimus Prime. Ultra Magnus defers leadership to Rodimus and serves as an advisor to the new leader. In the film, he is voiced by Robert Stack in English and Show Hayami in Japanese.

Ultra Magnus later returned in the Transformers comic series published by Dreamwave Productions. In this series, Ultra Magnus is the brother of Optimus Prime, and he becomes an Autobot leader when Optimus Prime and Megatron disappear. He and the Decepticon Shockwave eventually end the war and broker peace between the two factions, but Shockwave betrays Ultra Magnus and severely wounds him. In the 2000 animated series Transformers: Robots in Disguise, Ultra Magnus is again depicted as the brother of Optimus Prime. This version of the character is able to combine with his brother into a new form called Omega Prime. The original Japanese name for this version of the character is God Magnus.

In the Transformers comic series by IDW Publishing, Ultra Magnus takes the role of a law enforcement officer that punishes any who break the laws of Cybertron regardless of allegiance. As he pursues the felon Decepticon Swindle across the galaxy, he meets the Autobot commander Bumblebee, who urges Ultra Magnus to join the Autobots in the war against the Decepticons. The comic series by Skybound Entertainment and Image Comics depicts Ultra Magnus as a traumatized war veteran that was captured by the Decepticons and tortured for years by Shockwave. Dan Mora, an artist for the Skybound series, has stated that he "hates" drawing Ultra Magnus on account of his complicated design.
