= Transformers: Scramble City =

1986 original video animation

- Scramble City title card

トランスフォーマー スクランブルシティ発動編
- Genre: Science fiction, adventure, mecha
- Original video animation
- Directed by: Yuji Endo
- Produced by: Hirohisa Sato; Yoshifumi Hatano; Koji Sekiguchi
- Written by: Toyohiro Ando
- Music by: Sosan Tajima
- Studio: Toei Animation
- Released: April 1, 1986
- Runtime: 15 minutes

Transformers: Scramble City Activation (トランスフォーマー スクランブルシティ発動編), mostly referred to as just Scramble City (スクランブルシティ) is an episode of The Transformers released as an OVA (Original Video Animation) in Japan on April 1, 1986. It was created as a promotional video for the new line of 'Scramble City' toys and the cassettes that were paired with the toy sets. Despite strong belief (such as that voiced on the 20th Anniversary DVD bonus commentary for the episode), it was not meant to introduce Japanese audiences to the new characters from The Transformers: The Movie (considering Ultra Magnus, Ramhorn, Steeljaw, and Ratbat are the only ones from the film that appear in it). Chronologically, it takes place years before the movie, during the early stages of construction on Autobot City.

== Plot ==
Beginning with a recap of the coming of the Transformers to Earth and the story of Devastator, the OVA then gets its original story underway, as the Autobots are shown to be in the midst of constructing the powerful "Scramble City", overseen by their newest arrival, Ultra Magnus. When the Decepticons learn of this, their combiner robots are deployed to attack, and a battle between them and their Autobot counterparts ensues, focusing on their "Scramble Power" – the interchangeability of the individual limbs – to the extent that at one point, Wildrider of the Stunticons connects to Superion to damage him. At the OVA's conclusion, Scramble City is activated and assumes its robot mode of Metroplex to rout the Decepticons. However, from the ocean depths, the Decepticons' own city, Trypticon, rises.

This cliffhanger was never resolved as no direct sequel was ever produced. An extended commercial, called Scramble City Toys but often mistakenly identified as Scramble City 2, was released, but rather than wrap up the cliffhanger, it retold the OVA through stop-motion animation of the toys themselves, with one addition: the introduction of Galvatron, erroneously presented as one of Megatron's troops, rather than the recreated Decepticon leader himself.

== Cast ==
- Tesshō Genda as Convoy
- Osamu Saka as Wheeljack
- Tomomichi Nishimura as Silverbolt & Superion
- Keiichi Nanba as Blaster
- Banjō Ginga as Ultra Magnus
- Seizō Katō as Megatron & Devastator
- Hirotaka Suzuoki as Starscream
- Yū Shimaka as Bruticus, Onslaught & Thundercracker
- Kōji Totani as Motormaster & Menasor
- Yoku Shioya as Bumblebee & Fireflight
- Takurō Kitagawa as Skydive, Warpath, Mixmaster & Scavenger
- Masashi Ebara as Teletraan 1 & Skywarp
- Shō Hayami as Blast Off, Bonecrusher, Ironhide, Tracks & Spike Witwicky
- Ken Shiroyama as Ratbat
- Toshio Ishii as Jazz & Long Haul
- Issei Masamune as the narrator & Soundwave

== Notes ==
- Scramble City is part of the Japanese continuity, but not the American. Scramble City Toys is not part of either, and is simply a toy advert.
- For Scramble City the first seven minutes or so of the episode consists of recycled animation sequences from the G1 episodes "More than Meets the Eye" (the three part series pilot) and the eleventh season 2 episode "The Master Builders" in addition to a remixed season 2 opening with Japanese titles and music. A "Scramble City" logo follows, with the next fifteen minutes consisting of new, never-before-seen (to US audiences) animation. The post-ending sequence consists of more stock footage taken from the previously mentioned episodes with music and Japanese titles.
- "Scramble City" is included as a special feature on Transformers: The Movie 20th Anniversary Special Edition 2-Disc DVD, although due to rights issues with the entirety of the soundtrack, only a fan commentary (and no subtitles) was provided without full original Japanese audio.
- In 2007, "Scramble City" was released with full original Japanese audio and subtitles (with optional fan commentary) on the region 2 "Ultimate Edition" version of the movie. However, the video source for the episode was taken from an unofficial fansubbed copy, with misspelled hard subtitles and a crop all around the picture. Additionally, a poor standards conversion from NTSC to PAL resulted in a green tint on the picture - making it look worse than the unlicensed copies in distribution.
